= List of teams and cyclists in the 1933 Tour de France =

List of cyclists

In the 1933 Tour de France, Belgium, Italy, Switzerland, Germany and France entered national teams, consisting of eight cyclists. Additionally, 40 touriste-routiers, cyclists without a team, entered the race.

The French team has been named the best collection of pre-war cyclists. The Belgian team had talented riders, but were split between French-speaking and Dutch-speaking cyclists. The Italian team was headed by Learco Guerra. Guerra had won three stages in the 1933 Giro d'Italia and had been world champion. Tour director Henri Desgrange had named Guerra as probable winner of the race.

== By rider ==
Legend
No.	Starting number worn by the rider during the Tour
Pos.	Position in the general classification
DNF	Denotes a rider who did not finish

No.	Name	Nationality	Team	Pos.	Ref
1	Georges Ronsse	Belgium	Belgium	DNF	
2	Jean Aerts	Belgium	Belgium	9	
3	Georges Lemaire	Belgium	Belgium	4	
4	Alphonse Schepers	Belgium	Belgium	18	
5	Gaston Rebry	Belgium	Belgium	14	
6	Jan Wauters	Belgium	Belgium	DNF	
7	Alfons Deloor	Belgium	Belgium	27	
8	Joseph Moerenhout	Belgium	Belgium	DNF	
9	Learco Guerra	Italy	Italy	2	
10	Raffaele di Paco	Italy	Italy	DNF	
11	Francesco Camusso	Italy	Italy	DNF	
12	Domenico Piemontesi	Italy	Italy	DNF	
13	Vasco Bergamaschi	Italy	Italy	39	
14	Fabio Battesini	Italy	Italy	DNF	
15	Luigi Giacobbe	Italy	Italy	28	
16	Allegro Grandi	Italy	Italy	DNF	
17	Albert Büchi	Switzerland	Switzerland	13	
18	Alfred Büchi	Switzerland	Switzerland	20	
19	Georges Antenen	Switzerland	Switzerland	DNF	
20	Walter Blattmann	Switzerland	Switzerland	30	
21	Roger Pipoz	Switzerland	Switzerland	36	
22	August Erne	Switzerland	Switzerland	DNF	
23	Alfred Bula	Switzerland	Switzerland	25	
24	Luigi Luisoni	Switzerland	Switzerland	DNF	
25	Kurt Stöpel	Germany	Germany/Austria	10	
26	Oskar Thierbach	Germany	Germany/Austria	23	
27	Ludwig Geyer	Germany	Germany/Austria	12	
28	Herbert Sieronski	Germany	Germany/Austria	DNF	
29	Hermann Buse	Germany	Germany/Austria	DNF	
30	Willy Kutschbach	Germany	Germany/Austria	DNF	
31	Max Bulla	Austria	Germany/Austria	DNF	
32	Karl Altenburger	Germany	Germany/Austria	DNF	
33	Charles Pélissier	France	France	DNF	
34	André Leducq	France	France	31	
35	Maurice Archambaud	France	France	5	
36	Georges Speicher	France	France	1	
37	Antonin Magne	France	France	8	
38	Léon Le Calvez	France	France	17	
39	Roger Lapébie	France	France	29	
40	René Le Grevès	France	France	19	
101	Antoine Dignef	Belgium	Touriste-routier	26	
102	Julien Vervaecke	Belgium	Touriste-routier	DNF	
103	Émile Joly	Belgium	Touriste-routier	DNF	
104	Camille Degraeve	Belgium	Touriste-routier	DNF	
105	Emile Decroix	Belgium	Touriste-routier	22	
106	Louis Hardiquest	Belgium	Touriste-routier	DNF	
107	Léon Louyet	Belgium	Touriste-routier	32	
108	Léopold Roosemont	Belgium	Touriste-routier	DNF	
109	Antonio Folco	Italy	Touriste-routier	DNF	
110	Robert Brugère	France	Touriste-routier	24	
111	Giovanni Firpo	Italy	Touriste-routier	DNF	
112	Amulio Viarengo	Italy	Touriste-routier	DNF	
113	André Gaillot	France	Touriste-routier	33	
114	Renato Scorticati	Italy	Touriste-routier	DNF	
115	Giuseppe Martano	Italy	Touriste-routier	3	
116	Eugenio Gestri	Italy	Touriste-routier	DNF	
117	Décimo Bettini	Italy	Touriste-routier	21	
118	Roger Strebel	Switzerland	Touriste-routier	DNF	
119	Vicente Trueba	Spain	Touriste-routier	6	
120	Francisco Cepeda	Spain	Touriste-routier	DNF	
121	Karl Thallinger	Austria	Touriste-routier	DNF	
122	Léon Level	France	Touriste-routier	7	
123	Benoît Faure	France	Touriste-routier	DNF	
124	René Bernard	France	Touriste-routier	34	
125	Roger Bisseron	France	Touriste-routier	DNF	
126	Adrien Buttafocchi	France	Touriste-routier	DNF	
127	Fernand Cornez	France	Touriste-routier	35	
128	Jean Driancourt	France	Touriste-routier	DNF	
129	Fernand Fayolle	France	Touriste-routier	11	
130	Émile Ignat	France	Touriste-routier	DNF	
131	Edmond Berenger	France	Touriste-routier	DNF	
132	François Haas	France	Touriste-routier	DNF	
133	Pierre Cloarec	France	Touriste-routier	38	
134	Auguste Monciero	France	Touriste-routier	DNF	
135	Ernest Neuhard	France	Touriste-routier	40	
136	Gaspard Rinaldi	France	Touriste-routier	15	
137	Pierre Pastorelli	France	Touriste-routier	37	
138	Louis Peglion	France	Touriste-routier	DNF	
139	Eugène Le Goff	France	Touriste-routier	16	
140	Jean-Baptiste Intcégaray	France	Touriste-routier	DNF	
