= 1933 Tour de France, Stage 1 to Stage 12 =

Cycling race stages

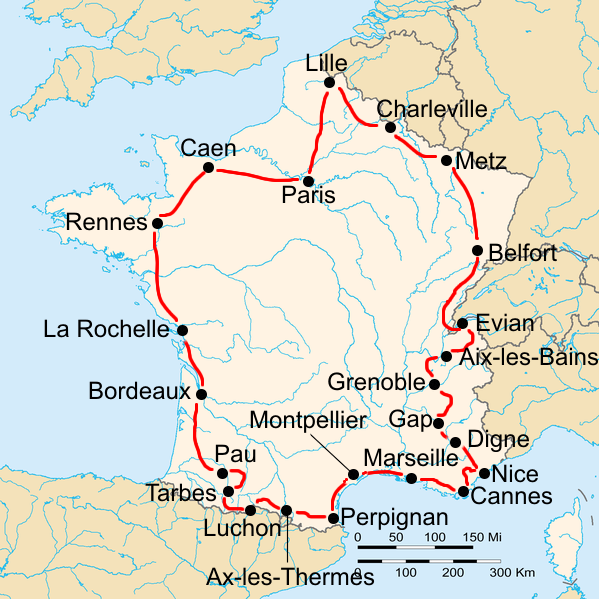
Route of the 1933 Tour de France

The 1933 Tour de France was the 27th edition of the Tour de France, one of cycling's Grand Tours. The Tour began in Paris with a flat stage on 27 June, and Stage 12 occurred on 10 July with a flat stage to Marseille. The race finished in Paris on 23 July.

== Stage 1 ==
27 June 1933 – Paris to Lille, 262 km (163 mi)

Stage 1 result and general classification after stage 1

Rank	Rider	Team	Time
1	Maurice Archambaud (FRA)	France	7h 48' 45"
2	Léon Louyet (BEL)	Touriste-routier	+ 2' 32"
3	Jean Aerts (BEL)	Belgium	s.t.
4	Georges Lemaire (BEL)	Belgium	s.t.
5	Gaston Rebry (BEL)	Belgium	s.t.
6	Emile Decroix (BEL)	Touriste-routier	s.t.
7	Georges Speicher (FRA)	France	s.t.
8	Kurt Stöpel (GER)	Germany/Austria	s.t.
9	Jan Wauters (BEL)	Belgium	s.t.
10	Louis Hardiquest (BEL)	Touriste-routier	s.t.

== Stage 2 ==
28 June 1933 – Lille to Charleville, 192 km (119 mi)

Stage 2 result

Rank	Rider	Team	Time
1	Learco Guerra (ITA)	Italy	5h 33' 52"
2	Jean Aerts (BEL)	Belgium	s.t.
3	Georges Ronsse (BEL)	Belgium	s.t.
4	Gaston Rebry (BEL)	Belgium	s.t.
5	René Le Grevès (FRA)	France	s.t.
6	Maurice Archambaud (FRA)	France	s.t.
7	Jan Wauters (BEL)	Belgium	s.t.
8	Louis Hardiquest (BEL)	Touriste-routier	s.t.
9	Hermann Buse (GER)	Germany/Austria	s.t.
10	Julien Vervaecke (BEL)	Touriste-routier	s.t.

General classification after stage 2

Rank	Rider	Team	Time
1	Maurice Archambaud (FRA)	France	
2	Jean Aerts (BEL)	Belgium	+ 6' 32"
3	Georges Lemaire (BEL)	Belgium	+ 7' 32"
4			
5			
6			
7			
8			
9			
10			

== Stage 3 ==
29 June 1933 – Charleville to Metz, 166 km (103 mi)

Stage 3 result

Rank	Rider	Team	Time
1	Alphonse Schepers (BEL)	Belgium	4h 37' 24"
2	Georges Ronsse (BEL)	Belgium	s.t.
3	Hermann Buse (GER)	Germany/Austria	s.t.
4	Gaspard Rinaldi (FRA)	Touriste-routier	s.t.
5	Francesco Camusso (ITA)	Italy	s.t.
6	Louis Hardiquest (BEL)	Touriste-routier	s.t.
7	Roger Lapébie (FRA)	France	+ 1' 44"
8	Fernand Cornez (FRA)	Touriste-routier	s.t.
9	Max Bulla (AUT)	Germany/Austria	s.t.
10	Gaston Rebry (BEL)	Belgium	s.t.

General classification after stage 3

Rank	Rider	Team	Time
1	Maurice Archambaud (FRA)	France	
2	Jean Aerts (BEL)	Belgium	+ 6' 32"
3	Georges Lemaire (BEL)	Belgium	+ 7' 32"
4			
5			
6			
7			
8			
9			
10			

== Stage 4 ==
30 June 1933 – Metz to Belfort, 220 km (140 mi)

Stage 4 result

Rank	Rider	Team	Time
1	Jean Aerts (BEL)	Belgium	7h 14' 15"
2	Fernand Cornez (FRA)	Touriste-routier	s.t.
3	Learco Guerra (ITA)	Italy	s.t.
4	Maurice Archambaud (FRA)	France	s.t.
5	Antonin Magne (FRA)	France	s.t.
6	Louis Hardiquest (BEL)	Touriste-routier	s.t.
7	Georges Lemaire (BEL)	Belgium	s.t.
8	Ludwig Geyer (GER)	Germany/Austria	s.t.
9	Gaspard Rinaldi (FRA)	Touriste-routier	s.t.
10	Vicente Trueba (ESP)	Touriste-routier	s.t.

General classification after stage 4

Rank	Rider	Team	Time
1	Maurice Archambaud (FRA)	France	
2	Jean Aerts (BEL)	Belgium	+ 4' 32"
3	Georges Lemaire (BEL)	Belgium	+ 7' 32"
4			
5			
6			
7			
8			
9			
10			

== Stage 5 ==
1 July 1933 – Belfort to Evian, 293 km (182 mi)

Stage 5 result

Rank	Rider	Team	Time
1	Léon Louyet (BEL)	Touriste-routier	9h 59' 58"
2	Roger Lapébie (FRA)	France	s.t.
3	Jean Aerts (BEL)	Belgium	s.t.
4	Kurt Stöpel (GER)	Germany/Austria	s.t.
5	Raffaele di Paco (ITA)	Italy	s.t.
6	Fernand Cornez (FRA)	Touriste-routier	s.t.
=7	Georges Lemaire (BEL)	Belgium	s.t.
=7	Alphonse Schepers (BEL)	Belgium	s.t.
=7	Gaston Rebry (BEL)	Belgium	s.t.
=7	Joseph Moerenhout (BEL)	Belgium	s.t.

General classification after stage 5

Rank	Rider	Team	Time
1	Maurice Archambaud (FRA)	France	
2	Jean Aerts (BEL)	Belgium	+ 4' 32"
3	Georges Lemaire (BEL)	Belgium	+ 7' 32"
4			
5			
6			
7			
8			
9			
10			

== Stage 6 ==
3 July 1933 – Evian to Aix-les-Bains, 207 km (129 mi)

Stage 6 result

Rank	Rider	Team	Time
1	Learco Guerra (ITA)	Italy	6h 55' 07"
2	Kurt Stöpel (GER)	Germany/Austria	s.t.
3	René Le Grevès (FRA)	France	s.t.
4	Jean Aerts (BEL)	Belgium	s.t.
5	Alphonse Schepers (BEL)	Belgium	s.t.
6	Georges Speicher (FRA)	France	s.t.
=7	Robert Brugère (FRA)	Touriste-routier	s.t.
=7	Georges Lemaire (BEL)	Belgium	s.t.
=7	Gaston Rebry (BEL)	Belgium	s.t.
=7	Francesco Camusso (ITA)	Italy	s.t.

General classification after stage 6

Rank	Rider	Team	Time
1	Maurice Archambaud (FRA)	France	
2	Jean Aerts (BEL)	Belgium	+ 4' 32"
3	Learco Guerra (ITA)	Italy	+ 6' 24"
4			
5			
6			
7			
8			
9			
10			

== Stage 7 ==
4 July 1933 – Aix-les-Bains to Grenoble, 229 km (142 mi)

Stage 7 result

Rank	Rider	Team	Time
1	Learco Guerra (ITA)	Italy	8h 43' 46"
2	Gaspard Rinaldi (FRA)	Touriste-routier	s.t.
3	Alfred Bula (SUI)	Switzerland	s.t.
4	Antonin Magne (FRA)	France	s.t.
5	Ludwig Geyer (GER)	Germany	s.t.
6	Eugène Le Goff (FRA)	Touriste-routier	s.t.
7	Léon Level (FRA)	Touriste-routier	s.t.
8	Maurice Archambaud (FRA)	France	s.t.
9	Vicente Trueba (ESP)	Touriste-routier	s.t.
10	Giuseppe Martano (ITA)	Touriste-routier	s.t.

General classification after stage 7

Rank	Rider	Team	Time
1	Maurice Archambaud (FRA)	France	
2	Learco Guerra (ITA)	Italy	+ 4' 24"
3	Jean Aerts (BEL)	Belgium	+ 8' 17"
4			
5			
6			
7			
8			
9			
10			

== Stage 8 ==
5 July 1933 – Grenoble to Gap, 102 km (63 mi)

Stage 8 result

Rank	Rider	Team	Time
1	Georges Speicher (FRA)	France	3h 25' 40"
2	Georges Lemaire (BEL)	Belgium	s.t.
3	Giuseppe Martano (ITA)	Touriste-routier	s.t.
4	Albert Büchi (SUI)	Switzerland	+ 30"
5	Léon Level (FRA)	Touriste-routier	+ 45"
6	Maurice Archambaud (FRA)	France	s.t.
7	Francesco Camusso (ITA)	Italy	+ 4' 20"
8	Oskar Thierbach (GER)	Germany/Austria	+ 4' 33"
9	Kurt Stöpel (GER)	Germany/Austria	+ 4' 45"
10	Antonin Magne (FRA)	France	+ 5' 07"

General classification after stage 8

Rank	Rider	Team	Time
1	Maurice Archambaud (FRA)	France	
2	Learco Guerra (ITA)	Italy	+ 8' 53"
3	Georges Lemaire (BEL)	Belgium	+ 9' 48"
4			
5			
6			
7			
8			
9			
10			

== Stage 9 ==
6 July 1933 – Gap to Digne, 227 km (141 mi)

Stage 9 result

Rank	Rider	Team	Time
1	Georges Speicher (FRA)	France	8h 46' 08"
2	Giuseppe Martano (ITA)	Touriste-routier	s.t.
3	Fernand Fayolle (FRA)	Touriste-routier	s.t.
4	Eugène Le Goff (FRA)	Touriste-routier	s.t.
5	Vicente Trueba (ESP)	Touriste-routier	s.t.
6	Léon Level (FRA)	Touriste-routier	+ 2' 22"
7	Kurt Stöpel (GER)	Germany/Austria	s.t.
8	Georges Lemaire (BEL)	Belgium	s.t.
9	Learco Guerra (ITA)	Italy	+ 3' 40"
10	Albert Büchi (SUI)	Switzerland	s.t.

General classification after stage 9

Rank	Rider	Team	Time
1	Georges Lemaire (BEL)	Belgium	
2	Learco Guerra (ITA)	Italy	+ 23"
3	Georges Speicher (FRA)	France	+ 2' 56"
4			
5			
6			
7			
8			
9			
10			

== Stage 10 ==
7 July 1933 – Digne to Nice, 156 km (97 mi)

Stage 10 result

Rank	Rider	Team	Time
1	Fernand Cornez (FRA)	Touriste-routier	4h 32' 30"
2	Fernand Fayolle (FRA)	Touriste-routier	s.t.
3	Pierre Pastorelli (FRA)	Touriste-routier	+ 12' 12"
4	Alfred Bula (SUI)	Switzerland	s.t.
5	Vicente Trueba (ESP)	Touriste-routier	s.t.
6	Léon Le Calvez (FRA)	France	+ 15' 28"
7	Roger Lapébie (FRA)	France	+ 22' 27"
8	Léon Louyet (BEL)	Touriste-routier	s.t.
9	Georges Speicher (FRA)	France	s.t.
10	Auguste Monciero (FRA)	Touriste-routier	s.t.

General classification after stage 10

Rank	Rider	Team	Time
1	Georges Lemaire (BEL)	Belgium	
2	Learco Guerra (ITA)	Italy	+ 23"
3	Georges Speicher (FRA)	France	+ 2' 56"
4			
5			
6			
7			
8			
9			
10			

== Stage 11 ==
9 July 1933 – Nice to Cannes, 128 km (80 mi)

Stage 11 result

Rank	Rider	Team	Time
1	Maurice Archambaud (FRA)	France	3h 55' 53"
2	Gaspard Rinaldi (FRA)	Touriste-routier	+ 1' 17"
3	Oskar Thierbach (GER)	Germany/Austria	s.t.
4	Vicente Trueba (ESP)	Touriste-routier	s.t.
5	Giuseppe Martano (ITA)	Touriste-routier	+ 2' 31"
6	Albert Büchi (SUI)	Switzerland	s.t.
7	Georges Speicher (FRA)	France	s.t.
8	Alfred Bula (SUI)	Switzerland	s.t.
9	Georges Lemaire (BEL)	Belgium	s.t.
10	Alphonse Schepers (BEL)	Belgium	s.t.

General classification after stage 11

Rank	Rider	Team	Time
1	Maurice Archambaud (FRA)	France	
2	Georges Lemaire (BEL)	Belgium	+ 44"
3	Georges Speicher (FRA)	France	+ 3' 40"
4			
5			
6			
7			
8			
9			
10			

== Stage 12 ==
10 July 1933 – Cannes to Marseille, 208 km (129 mi)

Stage 12 result

Rank	Rider	Team	Time
1	Georges Speicher (FRA)	France	7h 01' 15"
=2	René Bernard (FRA)	Touriste-routier	s.t.
=2	Léon Level (FRA)	Touriste-routier	s.t.
4	René Le Grevès (FRA)	France	+ 1' 11"
5	Léon Louyet (BEL)	Touriste-routier	s.t.
6	Georges Lemaire (BEL)	Belgium	s.t.
7	Ludwig Geyer (GER)	Germany/Austria	s.t.
8	Gaspard Rinaldi (FRA)	Touriste-routier	s.t.
=9	Alphonse Schepers (BEL)	Belgium	s.t.
=9	Learco Guerra (ITA)	Italy	s.t.

General classification after stage 12

Rank	Rider	Team	Time
1	Georges Speicher (FRA)	France	
2	Georges Lemaire (BEL)	Belgium	+ 15"
3	Learco Guerra (ITA)	Italy	+ 5' 51"
4			
5			
6			
7			
8			
9			
10			
