= 1933 Tour de France, Stage 13 to Stage 23 =

Cycling race stages

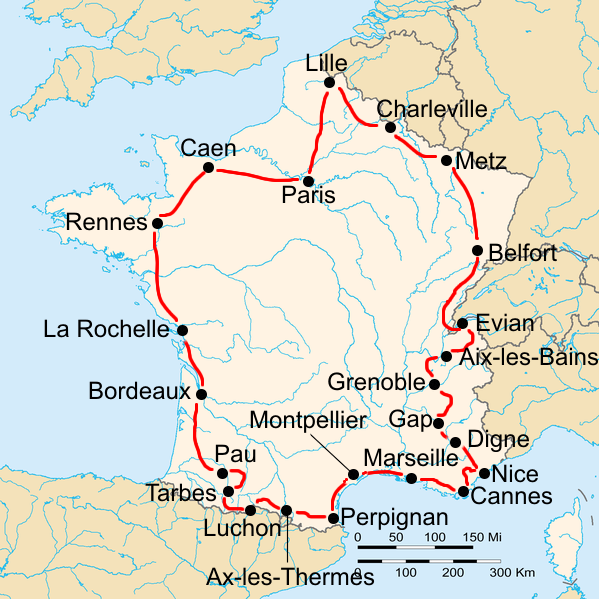
Route of the 1933 Tour de France

The 1933 Tour de France was the 27th edition of the Tour de France, one of cycling's Grand Tours. The Tour began in Paris with a flat stage on 27 June, and Stage 13 occurred on 11 July with a flat stage from Marseille. The race finished in Paris on 23 July.

== Stage 13 ==
11 July 1933 – Marseille to Montpellier, 168 km (104 mi)

Stage 13 result

Rank	Rider	Team	Time
1	André Leducq (FRA)	France	6h 03' 46"
2	Léon Louyet (BEL)	Touriste-routier	s.t.
3	René Le Grevès (FRA)	France	s.t.
4	Fernand Cornez (FRA)	Touriste-routier	s.t.
5	Kurt Stöpel (GER)	Germany/Austria	s.t.
6	Georges Speicher (FRA)	France	s.t.
=7	Learco Guerra (ITA)	Italy	s.t.
=7	Jean Aerts (BEL)	Belgium	s.t.
=7	Georges Lemaire (BEL)	Belgium	s.t.
=7	Alphonse Schepers (BEL)	Belgium	s.t.

General classification after stage 13

Rank	Rider	Team	Time
1	Georges Speicher (FRA)	France	
2	Georges Lemaire (BEL)	Belgium	+ 15"
3	Learco Guerra (ITA)	Italy	+ 5' 51"
4			
5			
6			
7			
8			
9			
10			

== Stage 14 ==
12 July 1933 – Montpellier to Perpignan, 166 km (103 mi)

Stage 14 result

Rank	Rider	Team	Time
1	André Leducq (FRA)	France	6h 04' 40"
2	Antonin Magne (FRA)	France	s.t.
3	Fernand Cornez (FRA)	Touriste-routier	s.t.
4	Gaston Rebry (BEL)	Belgium	s.t.
5	Vasco Bergamaschi (ITA)	Italy	s.t.
6	Jean Aerts (BEL)	Belgium	s.t.
7	Georges Speicher (FRA)	France	s.t.
8	Learco Guerra (ITA)	Italy	s.t.
9	Léon Louyet (BEL)	Touriste-routier	s.t.
10	René Le Grevès (FRA)	France	s.t.

General classification after stage 14

Rank	Rider	Team	Time
1	Georges Speicher (FRA)	France	
2	Georges Lemaire (BEL)	Belgium	+ 15"
3	Learco Guerra (ITA)	Italy	+ 5' 51"
4			
5			
6			
7			
8			
9			
10			

== Stage 15 ==
14 July 1933 – Perpignan to Ax-les-Thermes, 158 km (98 mi)

Stage 15 result

Rank	Rider	Team	Time
1	Jean Aerts (BEL)	Belgium	5h 58' 55"
2	Fernand Cornez (FRA)	Touriste-routier	s.t.
3	Georges Speicher (FRA)	France	s.t.
4	Kurt Stöpel (GER)	Germany/Austria	s.t.
5	Alfred Bula (SUI)	Switzerland	s.t.
6	Alphonse Schepers (BEL)	Belgium	s.t.
7	Emile Decroix (BEL)	Touriste-routier	s.t.
8	René Le Grevès (FRA)	France	s.t.
9	Giuseppe Martano (ITA)	Touriste-routier	s.t.
10	Gaston Rebry (BEL)	Belgium	s.t.

General classification after stage 15

Rank	Rider	Team	Time
1	Georges Speicher (FRA)	France	
2	Georges Lemaire (BEL)	Belgium	+ 15"
3	Learco Guerra (ITA)	Italy	+ 7' 01"
4			
5			
6			
7			
8			
9			
10			

== Stage 16 ==
15 July 1933 – Ax-les-Thermes to Luchon, 165 km (103 mi)

Stage 16 result

Rank	Rider	Team	Time
1	Léon Louyet (BEL)	Touriste-routier	5h 47' 01"
2	Georges Speicher (FRA)	France	s.t.
3	Kurt Stöpel (GER)	Germany/Austria	s.t.
4	Learco Guerra (ITA)	Italy	s.t.
=5	Georges Lemaire (BEL)	Belgium	s.t.
=5	Gaston Rebry (BEL)	Belgium	s.t.
=5	Alphonse Schepers (BEL)	Belgium	s.t.
=5	Vasco Bergamaschi (ITA)	Italy	s.t.
=5	Albert Büchi (SUI)	Switzerland	s.t.
=5	Luigi Giacobbe (ITA)	Italy	s.t.

General classification after stage 16

Rank	Rider	Team	Time
1	Georges Speicher (FRA)	France	
2	Georges Lemaire (BEL)	Belgium	+ 1' 15"
3	Learco Guerra (ITA)	Italy	+ 8' 01"
4			
5			
6			
7			
8			
9			
10			

== Stage 17 ==
16 July 1933 – Luchon to Tarbes, 91 km (57 mi)

Stage 17 result

Rank	Rider	Team	Time
1	Jean Aerts (BEL)	Belgium	2h 57' 24"
2	Giuseppe Martano (ITA)	Touriste-routier	s.t.
3	Vicente Trueba (ESP)	Touriste-routier	s.t.
4	Antonin Magne (FRA)	France	+ 3' 32"
5	Learco Guerra (ITA)	Italy	s.t.
6	Georges Speicher (FRA)	France	s.t.
7	Luigi Giacobbe (ITA)	Italy	s.t.
8	Albert Büchi (SUI)	Switzerland	s.t.
9	Antoine Dignef (BEL)	Touriste-routier	s.t.
10	Léon Le Calvez (FRA)	France	s.t.

General classification after stage 17

Rank	Rider	Team	Time
1	Georges Speicher (FRA)	France	
2	Giuseppe Martano (ITA)	Touriste-routier	+ 4' 08"
3	Georges Lemaire (BEL)	Belgium	+ 7' 07"
4			
5			
6			
7			
8			
9			
10			

== Stage 18 ==
17 July 1933 – Tarbes to Pau, 185 km (115 mi)

Stage 18 result

Rank	Rider	Team	Time
1	Learco Guerra (ITA)	Italy	7h 00' 23"
2	Georges Speicher (FRA)	France	s.t.
3	Giuseppe Martano (ITA)	Touriste-routier	s.t.
4	Léon Level (FRA)	Touriste-routier	s.t.
5	Fernand Fayolle (FRA)	Touriste-routier	s.t.
6	Antonin Magne (FRA)	France	s.t.
7	Vicente Trueba (ESP)	Touriste-routier	s.t.
8	Maurice Archambaud (FRA)	France	+ 3' 14"
9	André Gaillot (FRA)	Touriste-routier	s.t.
10	Léon Le Calvez (FRA)	France	+ 7' 38"

General classification after stage 18

Rank	Rider	Team	Time
1	Georges Speicher (FRA)	France	
2	Giuseppe Martano (ITA)	Touriste-routier	+ 5' 08"
3	Learco Guerra (ITA)	Italy	+ 7' 01"
4			
5			
6			
7			
8			
9			
10			

== Stage 19 ==
19 July 1933 – Pau to Bordeaux, 233 km (145 mi)

Stage 19 result

Rank	Rider	Team	Time
1	Jean Aerts (BEL)	Belgium	7h 54' 01"
2	René Le Grevès (FRA)	France	s.t.
3	Georges Speicher (FRA)	France	s.t.
4	Learco Guerra (ITA)	Italy	s.t.
5	Léon Le Calvez (FRA)	France	s.t.
6	Roger Lapébie (FRA)	France	s.t.
=7	Georges Lemaire (BEL)	Belgium	s.t.
=7	Alphonse Schepers (BEL)	Belgium	s.t.
=7	Gaston Rebry (BEL)	Belgium	s.t.
=7	Alfons Deloor (BEL)	Belgium	s.t.

General classification after stage 19

Rank	Rider	Team	Time
1	Georges Speicher (FRA)	France	
2	Giuseppe Martano (ITA)	Touriste-routier	+ 5' 08"
3	Learco Guerra (ITA)	Italy	+ 7' 01"
4			
5			
6			
7			
8			
9			
10			

== Stage 20 ==
20 July 1933 – Bordeaux to La Rochelle, 183 km (114 mi)

Stage 20 result

Rank	Rider	Team	Time
1	Jean Aerts (BEL)	Belgium	5h 53' 22"
2	Léon Le Calvez (FRA)	France	s.t.
3	Learco Guerra (ITA)	Italy	s.t.
4	Fernand Cornez (FRA)	Touriste-routier	s.t.
5	Kurt Stöpel (GER)	Germany/Austria	s.t.
6	René Le Grevès (FRA)	France	s.t.
7	Georges Speicher (FRA)	France	s.t.
8	Roger Lapébie (FRA)	France	s.t.
=9	Georges Lemaire (BEL)	Belgium	s.t.
=9	Alphonse Schepers (BEL)	Belgium	s.t.

General classification after stage 20

Rank	Rider	Team	Time
1	Georges Speicher (FRA)	France	
2	Giuseppe Martano (ITA)	Touriste-routier	+ 5' 08"
3	Learco Guerra (ITA)	Italy	+ 7' 01"
4			
5			
6			
7			
8			
9			
10			

== Stage 21 ==
21 July 1933 – La Rochelle to Rennes, 266 km (165 mi)

Stage 21 result

Rank	Rider	Team	Time
1	Jean Aerts (BEL)	Belgium	9h 12' 04"
2	Learco Guerra (ITA)	Italy	s.t.
3	Fernand Cornez (FRA)	Touriste-routier	s.t.
4	André Leducq (FRA)	France	s.t.
5	Léon Le Calvez (FRA)	France	s.t.
6	René Le Grevès (FRA)	France	s.t.
7	Léon Louyet (FRA)	Touriste-routier	s.t.
8	Kurt Stöpel (GER)	Germany/Austria	s.t.
9	Georges Speicher (FRA)	France	s.t.
10	Roger Lapébie (FRA)	France	s.t.

General classification after stage 21

Rank	Rider	Team	Time
1	Georges Speicher (FRA)	France	
2	Giuseppe Martano (ITA)	Touriste-routier	+ 5' 08"
3	Learco Guerra (ITA)	Italy	+ 6' 01"
4			
5			
6			
7			
8			
9			
10			

== Stage 22 ==
22 July 1933 – Rennes to Caen, 169 km (105 mi)

Stage 22 result

Rank	Rider	Team	Time
1	René Le Grevès (FRA)	France	4h 56' 00"
2	Fernand Cornez (FRA)	Touriste-routier	s.t.
=3	Learco Guerra (ITA)	Italy	s.t.
=3	Roger Lapébie (FRA)	France	s.t.
5	Alphonse Schepers (BEL)	Belgium	s.t.
6	Kurt Stöpel (GER)	Germany/Austria	s.t.
7	Antonin Magne (FRA)	France	s.t.
8	Georges Lemaire (BEL)	Belgium	s.t.
9	Georges Speicher (FRA)	France	s.t.
10	Gaspard Rinaldi (FRA)	Touriste-routier	s.t.

General classification after stage 22

Rank	Rider	Team	Time
1	Georges Speicher (FRA)	France	
2	Giuseppe Martano (ITA)	Touriste-routier	+ 5' 08"
3	Learco Guerra (ITA)	Italy	+ 6' 01"
4			
5			
6			
7			
8			
9			
10			

== Stage 23 ==
23 July 1933 – Caen to Paris, 222 km (138 mi)

Stage 23 result

Rank	Rider	Team	Time
1	Learco Guerra (ITA)	Italy	6h 52' 23"
2	Jean Aerts (BEL)	Belgium	s.t.
3	André Leducq (FRA)	France	s.t.
4	Kurt Stöpel (GER)	Germany/Austria	s.t.
=5	Georges Lemaire (BEL)	Belgium	s.t.
=5	Gaston Rebry (BEL)	Belgium	s.t.
=5	Vasco Bergamaschi (ITA)	Italy	s.t.
=5	Luigi Giacobbe (ITA)	Italy	s.t.
=5	Ludwig Geyer (GER)	Germany/Austria	s.t.
=5	Maurice Archambaud (FRA)	France	s.t.

General classification after stage 23

Rank	Rider	Team	Time
1	Georges Speicher (FRA)	France	147h 51' 37"
2	Learco Guerra (ITA)	Italy	+ 4' 01"
3	Giuseppe Martano (ITA)	Touriste-routier	+ 5' 08"
4	Georges Lemaire (BEL)	Belgium	+ 15' 45"
5	Maurice Archambaud (FRA)	France	+ 21' 22"
6	Vicente Trueba (ESP)	Touriste-routier	+ 27' 27"
7	Léon Level (FRA)	Touriste-routier	+ 35' 19"
8	Antonin Magne (FRA)	France	+ 36' 37"
9	Jean Aerts (BEL)	Belgium	+ 42' 53"
10	Kurt Stöpel (GER)	Germany/Austria	+ 45' 28"
