= 1933 Paris–Nice =

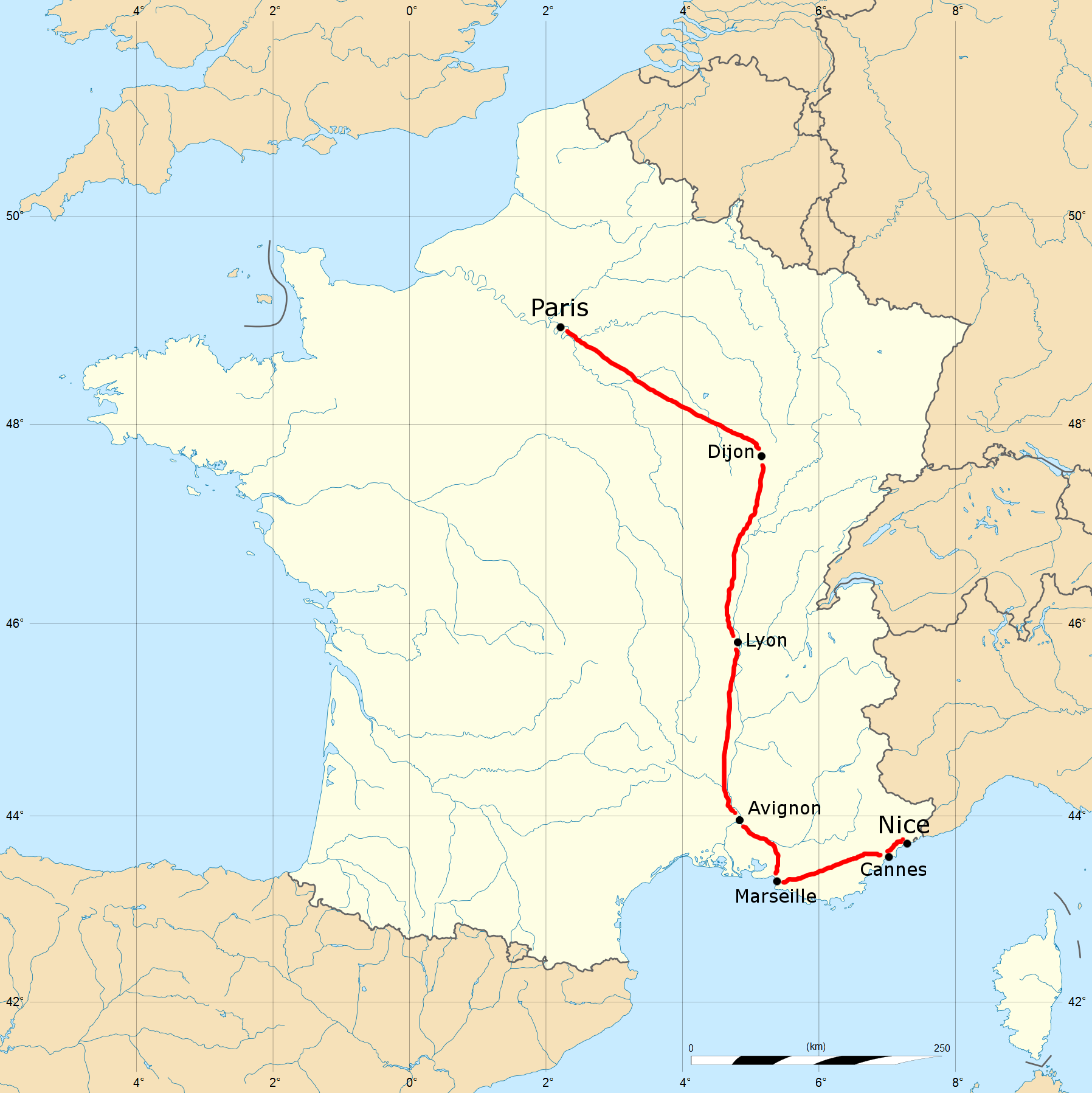
- The 1933 Paris–Nice route.

Race details
- Dates: March 14 – March 19
- Stages: 6
- Distance: 1,255 km (779.8 mi)
- Winning time: 37h 48' 07"

Results
	Winner	Alfons Schepers (BEL)
	Second	Louis Hardiquest (BEL)
	Third	Benoit Fauré (FRA)

The 1933 Paris–Nice was the first running of the Paris–Nice cycling stage race, also known as the Race to the Sun. It was set up by Albert Lucas to promote two newspapers he ran, Le Petit Journal and Le Petit Nice. It ran from 14 March to 19 March 1933. The winner was Alfons Schepers.

== Stages ==
=== 14 March 1933: Paris – Dijon, 312 km. ===
Stage 1 Result

	Rider	Time
1	Alfons Schepers (BEL)	8h 48' 50"
2	Benoît Fauré (FRA)	s.t.
3	Albert Barthélémy (FRA)	s.t.
4=	Emile Joly (BEL)	s.t.
4=	Raymond Louviot (FRA)	s.t.
4=	Joseph Soffietti (FRA)	ex aequo
7=	Emile Decroix (BEL)	+ 30"
7=	Julien Vervaecke (BEL)	ex aequo
9	Leon Tommies (BEL)	+ 2'30"
10	Jean Aerts (BEL)	s.t.

=== 15 March 1933: Dijon – Lyon, 198 km. ===
Stage 2 Result

	Rider	Time
1	Jean Aerts (BEL)	5h 12' 00"
2	Alfons Schepers (BEL)	s.t.
3	Albert Barthélémy (FRA)	s.t.
4	Jean Bidot (FRA)	s.t.

=== 16 March 1933: Lyon – Avignon, 222 km. ===
Stage 3 Result

	Rider	Time
1	Bernard Van Rysselberghe (BEL)	6h 40' 47"
2	Alfons Schepers (BEL)	s.t.
3	Alfons Deloor (BEL)	s.t.
4	Albert Gabard (FRA)	s.t.
5	Francesco Camusso (ITA)	s.t.
6	Joseph Horemans (BEL)	s.t.
7	Joseph Mauclair (FRA)	s.t.
8	Leon Tommies (BEL)	s.t.
9	Louis Hardiquest (BEL)	s.t.
10	Oreste Bernardoni (FRA)	s.t.

=== 17 March 1933: Avignon – Marseille, 204 km. ===
Stage 4 Result

	Rider	Time
1	Georges Speicher (FRA)	6h 49' 27"
2	Jules Merviel (FRA)	s.t.
3	Joseph Demuysere (BEL)	+ 1'07"
4	Leo De Rijck (BEL)	+ 2'28"
5	Bernard Van Rysselberghe (BEL)	s.t.
6	Gaspard Rinaldi (FRA)	s.t.

=== 18 March 1933: Marseille – Cannes, 209 km. ===
Stage 5 Result

	Rider	Time
1	Fernand Cornez (FRA)	6h 45' 05"
2	Alfons Schepers (BEL)	s.t.
3	Gaston Rebry (BEL)	s.t.
4	Roger Lapébie (FRA)	s.t.
5	Gaspard Rinaldi (FRA)	s.t.
6	Léon Louyet (BEL)	s.t.
7	Auguste Monciero (FRA)	s.t.
8	Adrien Buttafocchi (FRA)	s.t.
9	Francesco Camusso (ITA)	s.t.
10	Jean Bidot (FRA)	s.t.

=== 19 March 1933: Cannes – Nice, 110 km. ===
Stage 6 Result

	Rider	Time
1	Francesco Camusso (ITA)	3h 28' 00"
2	Jean Aerts (BEL)	+ 1'30"
3	Max Bulla (AUT)	s.t.
4	Joseph Demuysere (BEL)	s.t.
5	Luigi Barral (ITA)	s.t.
6	Alfons Schepers (BEL)	s.t.
7	Louis Hardiquest (BEL)	s.t.
8	Maurice Archambaud (FRA)	s.t.
9	Benoît Fauré (FRA)	s.t.
10	Fernand Mithouard (FRA)	+ 1'41"
