= 1931 UCI Road World Championships – Men's road race =

Men's Individual Road Race
1931 UCI Road World Championships
- Rainbow jersey

Race details
- Dates: 26 August 1931
- Stages: 1
- Distance: 170 km (105.6 mi)
- Winning time: 4h 53' 43"

Results
	Winner	Learco Guerra (ITA)	(Italy)
	Second	Ferdinand Le Drogo (FRA)	(France)
	Third	Albert Büchi (SUI)	(Switzerland)

The men's road race at the 1931 UCI Road World Championships was the fifth edition of the event. The race was held as an individual time trial rather than a mass start. The championship took place on Wednesday 26 August 1931 in Copenhagen, Denmark. The race was won by Learco Guerra of Italy.

== Race report ==
The professional riders had to cover a distance of 170 kilometres, on the Copenhagen-Ringsted-Bårse-Kuge-Copenhagen route. They started every five minutes. Of the 17 riders who started, 13 finished the race. Italy's Learco Guerra won in 4 h 53 min 43 s, more than four minutes ahead of Ferdinand Le Drogo of France and Swiss cyclist Albert Büchi.

== Final classification ==
General classification (1–10)

Rank	Rider	Time
1st place, gold medalist(s)	Learco Guerra (ITA)	4h 53' 43"
2nd place, silver medalist(s)	Ferdinand Le Drogo (FRA)	+ 4' 37"
3rd place, bronze medalist(s)	Albert Büchi (SUI)	+ 4' 48"
4	Fabio Battesini (ITA)	+ 5' 57"
5	Max Bulla (AUT)	+ 6' 23"
6	Alfredo Binda (ITA)	+ 8' 42"
7	Gaston Rebry (BEL)	+ 9' 59"
8	Jules Vanhevel (BEL)	+ 13' 46"
9	Maurice De Waele (BEL)	+ 14' 21"
10	Ludwig Geyer (GER)	+ 14' 46"
