= 1935 Tour de Suisse =

Race details
- Dates: 24–31 August 1935
- Stages: 7
- Distance: 1,708 km (1,061 mi)
- Winning time: 55h 16' 24"

Results
	Winner	Gaspard Rinaldi (FRA)
	Second	Leo Amberg (SUI)
	Third	Henri Garnier (BEL)

The 1935 Tour de Suisse was the third edition of the Tour de Suisse cycle race and was held from 24 August to 31 August 1935. The race started and finished in Zürich. The race was won by Gaspard Rinaldi.

== General classification ==
Final general classification

Rank	Rider	Time
1	Gaspard Rinaldi (FRA)	55h 16' 24"
2	Leo Amberg (SUI)	+ 1' 44"
3	Henri Garnier (BEL)	+ 4' 56"
4	Carlo Romanatti (ITA)	+ 11' 46"
5	Adrien Buttafocchi (FRA)	+ 13' 05"
6	Benoît Faure (FRA)	+ 20' 43"
7	Alfred Bula (SUI)	+ 21' 24"
8	Werner Buchwalder (SUI)	+ 40' 26"
9	Augusto Introzzi (ITA)	+ 42' 29"
10	Albert Büchi (SUI)	+ 43' 08"
