= 1931 Paris–Roubaix =

Cycling race

Race details
- Dates: 5 April 1931
- Stages: 1
- Distance: 256 km (159.1 mi)
- Winning time: 7h 01' 00"

Results
	Winner	Gaston Rebry (BEL)
	Second	Charles Pélissier (FRA)
	Third	Emile Decroix (BEL)

The 1931 Paris–Roubaix was the 32nd edition of the Paris–Roubaix, a classic one-day cycle race in France. The single day event was held on 5 April 1931 and stretched 256 km (159 mi) from Paris to its end in a velodrome in Roubaix. The winner was Gaston Rebry from Belgium.

== Results ==
Final results (1–10)
Rank	Cyclist	Time
1	Gaston Rebry (BEL)	7h 01' 00″
2	Charles Pélissier (FRA)	+1' 42″
3	Emile Decroix (BEL)	+1' 42″
4	Georges Ronsse (BEL)	+4' 00″
5	Emile Joly (BEL)	+4' 00″
6	Jef Demuysere (BEL)	+7' 00″
7	Alfons Schepers (BEL)	+8' 15″
8	Gustaaf Van Slembrouck (BEL)	+8' 15″
9	Romain Gijssels (BEL)	+8' 50″
10	Adolf Van Bruane (BEL)	+9' 10″
