= 1935 Paris–Roubaix =

Cycling race

Race details
- Dates: 21 April 1935
- Stages: 1
- Distance: 262 km (162.8 mi)
- Winning time: 6h 40' 57"

Results
	Winner	Gaston Rebry (BEL)
	Second	André Leducq (FRA)
	Third	Jean Aerts (BEL)

The 1935 Paris–Roubaix was the 36th edition of the Paris–Roubaix, a classic one-day cycle race in France. The single day event was held on 21 April 1935 and stretched 262 km (163 mi) from Paris to its end in a velodrome in Roubaix. The winner was Gaston Rebry from Belgium.

== Results ==
Final results (1–10)
Rank	Cyclist	Time
1	Gaston Rebry (BEL)	6h 40' 57″
2	André Leducq (FRA)	+2' 24″
3	Jean Aerts (BEL)	+4' 44″
4	René Vietto (FRA)	+4' 58″
5	Frans Bonduel (BEL)	+4' 58″
6	Maurice Krauss (FRA)	+4' 58″
7	Omer Taverne (BEL)	+5' 08″
8	Maurice Archambaud (FRA)	+6' 30″
9	Antoine Dignef (BEL)	+6' 39″
10	Adrien Buttafocchi (FRA)	+8' 20″
