= 1933 Paris–Tours =

Race details
- Dates: 30 April 1933
- Stages: 1
- Distance: 243 km (151.0 mi)
- Winning time: 6h 28' 30"

Results
	Winner	Jules Merviel (FRA)
	Second	Antonin Magne (FRA)
	Third	Ludwig Geyer (GER)

The 1933 Paris–Tours was the 28th edition of the Paris–Tours cycle race and was held on 30 April 1933. The race started in Paris and finished in Tours. The race was won by Jules Merviel.

== General classification ==
Final general classification

Rank	Rider	Time
1	Jules Merviel (FRA)	6h 28' 30"
2	Antonin Magne (FRA)	+ 0"
3	Ludwig Geyer (GER)	+ 0"
4	Robert Granier (FRA)	+ 0"
5	Roger Lapébie (FRA)	+ 3' 05"
6	André Leducq (FRA)	+ 3' 05"
7	Emile Joly (BEL)	+ 3' 05"
8	Albert Gabard (FRA)	+ 3' 05"
9	Léon Louyet (BEL)	+ 3' 05"
10	Fernand Mithouard (FRA)	+ 4' 00"
