= 1936 Tour de Suisse =

Race details
- Dates: 20–27 June 1936
- Stages: 7
- Distance: 1,657 km (1,030 mi)
- Winning time: 49h 34' 25"

Results
	Winner	Henri Garnier (BEL)	(Belgium)
	Second	Gustaaf Deloor (BEL)	(Belgium)
	Third	Leo Amberg (SUI)	(Switzerland)
	Mountains	Henri Garnier (BEL)	(Belgium)
	Team	Belgium	

The 1936 Tour de Suisse was the fourth edition of the Tour de Suisse cycle race and was held from 20 June to 27 June 1936. The race started and finished in Zürich. The race was won by Henri Garnier of the Belgian team.

== General classification ==
Final general classification

Rank	Rider	Team	Time
1	Henri Garnier (BEL)	Belgium	49h 34' 25"
2	Gustaaf Deloor (BEL)	Belgium	+ 7' 20"
3	Leo Amberg (SUI)	Switzerland	+ 23' 44"
4	Walter Blattmann (SUI)	Switzerland	+ 23' 58"
5	Léon Level (FRA)	France	+ 24' 30"
6	Alfons Deloor (BEL)	Belgium	+ 25' 06"
7	Paul Egli (SUI)	Switzerland	+ 27' 23"
8	Rafael Ramos (ESP)	Spain	+ 28' 47"
9	August Erne (SUI)	Switzerland	+ 31' 02"
10	Alfredo Malmesi (ITA)	Italy	+ 32' 59"
