= 1934 Tour of Flanders =

Race details
- Dates: 18 March 1934
- Stages: 1
- Distance: 239 km (148.5 mi)
- Winning time: 7h 00' 00"

Results
	Winner	Gaston Rebry (BEL)
	Second	Alfons Schepers (BEL)
	Third	Félicien Vervaecke (BEL)

The 18th edition of the Tour of Flanders cycling classic race was held on Sunday, 18 March 1934. Belgian Gaston Rebry won the Monument. Of the 158 starting cyclists, 48 reached the finish.

== Route ==
The race started in Ghent and covered 239 km on the way to the finish in Wetteren.

The course featured 3 categorized climbs:

- Kwaremont
- Kruisberg
- Edelareberg

== Race report ==
After a number of escapes, Gaston Rebry formed a leading group along the coast with 7 riders. One by one, Gaston Rebry left his fellow escapees behind and rode solo to the finish line. Rebry completed the race with an average of 34.142 km/h.

== General classification ==
=== Final general classification ===
Rank	Rider	Team	Time
1	Gaston Rebry (BEL)	Alcyon-Dunlop	7h 00' 00"
2	Alfons Schepers (BEL)	La Française-Dunlop	+ 2'00"
3	Félicien Vervaecke (BEL)	Labor	+ 6'55"
4	Richard Noterman (BEL)	La Française-Dunlop	s.t.
5	Maurice Cocquereaux (BEL)	Individual	+ 12'40"
6	Cesar Bogaert (NED)	Individual	+ 13'00"
7	Léon Tommies (BEL)	Alcyon-Dunlop	+ 14'15"
8	Armand van Bruaene (BEL)	Van Bruaene Sport	s.t.
9	Ernest Mottard (BEL)	Individual	s.t.
10	Theo Geunis (BEL)	Genial Lucifer-Hutchinson	s.t.
