= 1934 Tour de Suisse =

Cycling race in Switzerland

Race details
- Dates: 25 August–1 September 1934
- Stages: 7
- Distance: 1,475 km (916.5 mi)
- Winning time: 45h 04' 13"

Results
| | Winner | Ludwig Geyer (GER) |
| | Second | Léon Level (FRA) |
| | Third | Francesco Camusso (ITA) |

The 1934 Tour de Suisse was the 2nd edition of the Tour de Suisse stage race. It took place from 25 August to 1 September 1934. It started and finished in Zürich. The race was composed of seven stages. The event covered 1,475 km (916 mi) all in Switzerland. The race was won by Ludwig Geyer.

== General classification ==
Final general classification

| Rank | Rider | Time |
|---|---|---|
| 1 | Ludwig Geyer (GER) | 45h 04' 13" |
| 2 | Léon Level (FRA) | + 5' 39" |
| 3 | Francesco Camusso (ITA) | + 8' 45" |
| 4 | Hermann Buse (GER) | + 37' 56" |
| 5 | François Gardier (BEL) | + 39' 10" |
| 6 | Jean Aerts (BEL) | + 45' 03" |
| 7 | Henri Garnier (BEL) | + 48' 28" |
| 8 | Karl Bossard (SUI) | + 48' 42" |
| 9 | Oskar Thierbach (GER) | + 49' 46" |
| 10 | Mario Cipriani (ITA) | + 50' 32" |
