= 1933 Milan–San Remo =

Race details
- Dates: 26 March 1933
- Stages: 1
- Distance: 281.5 km (174.9 mi)
- Winning time: 7h 50' 41"

Results
| | Winner | Learco Guerra (ITA) |
| | Second | Alfredo Bovet (ITA) |
| | Third | Pietro Rimoldi (ITA) |

The 1933 Milan–San Remo was the 26th edition of the Milan–San Remo cycle race and was held on 26 March 1933. The race started in Milan and finished in San Remo. The race was won by Learco Guerra.

== General classification ==
Final general classification

| Rank | Rider | Time |
|---|---|---|
| 1 | Learco Guerra (ITA) | 7h 50' 41" |
| 2 | Alfredo Bovet (ITA) | + 0" |
| 3 | Pietro Rimoldi (ITA) | + 0" |
| 4 | Karl Altenburger (GER) | + 0" |
| 5 | Ludwig Geyer (GER) | + 0" |
| 6 | Alfredo Binda (ITA) | + 1' 56" |
| 7 | Antonio Negrini (ITA) | + 1' 56" |
| 8 | Decimo Bettini (ITA) | + 1' 56" |
| 9 | Carlo Moretti (ITA) | + 1' 56" |
| 10 | Michele Mara (ITA) | + 3' 29" |
