= Strebel =

Strebel is a German surname. Notable people with the surname include:

- Annika Strebel (born 1987), German wine queen
- Gustave Adolph Strebel (1875–1945), American political candidate from New York
- Hermann Strebel (1834–1914), German malacologist
- Kurt Strebel (1921–2013), Swiss mathematician
- Monica Strebel, Swiss actress
- Pascal Strebel (born 1988), Swiss wrestler
- Roger Strebel (1908–1981), Swiss racing cyclist
