= Kamiel De Graeve =

Belgian cyclist

Personal information
- Born: 4 August 1906 Antwerp, Belgium

Cycling career
- Sport: Cycling
- Discipline: Road
- Role: Rider

Kamiel De Graeve (born 4 August 1906, date of death unknown) was a Belgian racing cyclist. He rode in the 1933 Tour de France.
