= 1930 UCI Road World Championships =

1930 road cycling championship held in Belgium

- Venue: Liège, Belgium
- Date: 30 August 1930
- Coordinates: 50°38′23″N 05°34′14″E
- Events: 2

The 1930 UCI Road World Championships was the tenth edition of the UCI Road World Championships.

The championship took place in Liège, Belgium on Saturday 30 August 1930.

There were 23 professional cyclists and 22 amateurs at the start. The amateurs left one hour later than the professionals.

The course was 210.6 km, with winner Alfredo Binda finishing with an average speed of 27.953 km/h.

In the same period, the 1930 UCI Track Cycling World Championships was organized in the Stade du Centenaire in Brussels.

== Events Summary ==
Event	Gold		Silver		Bronze	
Men's Events
Professional Road Race	Alfredo Binda; Italy	7h 30' 45"; Media 27,953 km/h	Learco Guerra; Italy	s.t.	Georges Ronsse; Belgium	s.t.
Amateur Road Race	Giuseppe Martano; Italy	-	Eugenio Gestri; Italy	-	Rudolph Risch; Germany	-

== See also ==
- 1930 UCI Track Cycling World Championships
