= Luigi Luisoni =

Swiss cyclist

Personal information
- Born: 7 December 1907
- Died: 7 April 1982 (aged 74)

Cycling career
- Sport: Cycling
- Discipline: Road
- Role: Rider

Luigi Luisoni (7 December 1907 – 7 April 1982) was a Swiss racing cyclist. He rode in the 1933 Tour de France.
