= 1933 Giro d'Italia =

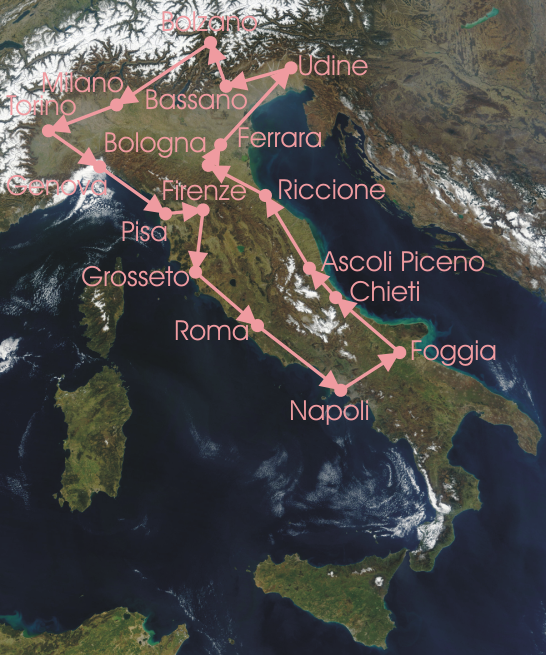
- Race Route

Race details
- Dates: 6–28 May 1933
- Stages: 17
- Distance: 3,343 km (2,077 mi)
- Winning time: 111h 01' 52"

Results
Jersey awarded to the overall winner	Winner	Alfredo Binda (ITA)	(Legnano)
	Second	Jef Demuysere (BEL)	(Ganna)
	Third	Domenico Piemontesi (ITA)	(Gloria)
	Mountains	Alfredo Binda (ITA)	(Legnano)
	Team	Legnano	

The 1933 Giro d'Italia was the 21st edition of the Giro d'Italia, organized and sponsored by the newspaper La Gazzetta dello Sport. The race began on 6 May in Milan with a stage that stretched 169 km (105 mi) to Turin, finishing back in Milan on 28 May after a 284 km (176 mi) stage and a total distance covered of 3,343 km (2,077 mi). The race was won by Alfredo Binda of the Legnano team (his fifth triumph in the Giro). Second and third respectively were the Belgian Jef Demuysere and Italian Domenico Piemontesi.

This 20th edition covered 3,343 km at an average speed of 30.043 km/h, for a total of 17 stages, including for the first individual time trial in the Giro.

== Participants ==
Of the 97 riders that began the Giro d'Italia on 6 May, 51 of them made it to the finish in Milan on 28 May. Riders were allowed to ride on their own or as a member of a team; 51 riders competed as members of a team, while the remaining 46 were independent riders. There were nine teams that competed in the race: Bestetti-d'Alessandro, Bianchi-Pirelli, Dei-Pirelli, Ganna-Hutchinson, Girardengo-Clément, Gloria-Hutchinson, Legnano-Hutchinson, Maino-Clément, and Olympia-Spiga.

The peloton was primarily composed of Italians. The field featured five former Giro d'Italia champions in four-time winner Alfredo Binda, two-time champion Costante Girardengo, single race winners Luigi Marchisio and Francesco Camusso, and reigning winner Antonio Pesenti. Other notable Italian riders that started the race included Learco Guerra, Giuseppe Olmo, Remo Bertoni, Felice Gremo, and Domenico Piemontesi. Notable non-Italian entrants included: Previous year podium finisher Jef Demuysere, Spanish climber Vicente Trueba, and renowned French cyclist René Vietto. Of all the entrants, Guerra was seen as the favorite to win the race after his victory in the Milan–San Remo earlier in the season.

== Race summary ==
Learco Guerra won the first stage for the third consecutive time. He lost weveral minutes in the second stage, won by Alfredo Binda; Binda became the new leader, with only Jef Demuysere within one minute.

The third and the fourth sprint ended in bunch sprints, so Binda easily kept the lead. The fifth stage saw the first categorized mountain climb ever; Binda reached the top first, but after that was left behind by other riders. Guerra won the sprint, and Demuysere finished in fourth place with the same time; Binda dropped to fourth place in the general classification and Demuysere became the new leader.

The sixth and seventh stages were again bunch sprints, without changes on top of the general classification. In the eighth stage, there was again a categorized mountain; Binda reached the top first, receiving a time bonus of two minutes. The stage itself was also won by Binda in the same time as the competition, but because of the time bonus on the mountain top he won back the pink jersey.

Binda won the ninth and tenth stage, extending his lead in the process. With these three stage wins in a row, the race had changed from a close race to a race where Binda was the clear leader. The next two stages did not change much, but then it was time for the first individual time trial in the Giro, over 62 km. Binda won, beating Demuysere by over one minute and the other riders by over three minutes. Thanks to the additional time bonus, he extended his lead in the general classification to over 6 minutes, and he was practically secured of the victory.

In the next stages, Binda did not get into problems, even securing more time bonuses by reaching the mountain tops in first place.

== Route and stages ==
La Gazzetta announced the route in March 1933. It was considered to delay the Giro by eight days to avoid overlap with the Tour of Germany, so that German riders could start in the Giro. When Hitler took power in Germany, he disbanded the existing cycling organisations and replaced them with the Deutscher Radfahrer-Verband; this meant that no Tour of Germany would be held in 1933, and the Giro did not need to move.

Stage results
Stage	Date	Course	Distance	Type (Note: In 1933, there was no distinction in the rules between plain stages and mountain stages; the icons shown here indicate that the fourth, fifth, sixth, tenth, eleventh, twelfth, and thirteenth stages included major mountains.)	Winner
1	6 May	Milan to Turin	169 km (105 mi)	Stage with mountain(s)	Learco Guerra (ITA)
2	7 May	Turin to Genoa	216 km (134 mi)	Stage with mountain(s)	Alfredo Binda (ITA)
3	8 May	Genoa to Pisa	191 km (119 mi)	Stage with mountain(s)	Learco Guerra (ITA)
	9 May	Rest day			
4	10 May	Pisa to Florence	184 km (114 mi)	Stage with mountain(s)	Giuseppe Olmo (ITA)
5	11 May	Florence to Grosseto	193 km (120 mi)	Stage with mountain(s)	Learco Guerra (ITA)
6	12 May	Grosseto to Rome	212 km (132 mi)	Stage with mountain(s)	Mario Cipriani (ITA)
	13 May	Rest day			
7	14 May	Rome to Naples	228 km (142 mi)	Plain stage	Gerard Loncke (BEL)
8	15 May	Naples to Foggia	195 km (121 mi)	Stage with mountain(s)	Alfredo Binda (ITA)
	16 May	Rest day			
9	17 May	Foggia to Chieti	248 km (154 mi)	Plain stage	Alfredo Binda (ITA)
10	18 May	Chieti to Ascoli Piceno	158 km (98 mi)	Stage with mountain(s)	Alfredo Binda (ITA)
	19 May	Rest day			
11	20 May	Ascoli Piceno to Riccione	208 km (129 mi)	Plain stage	Fernand Cornez (FRA)
12	21 May	Riccione to Bologna	189 km (117 mi)	Plain stage	Giuseppe Olmo (ITA)
13	22 May	Bologna to Ferrara	62 km (39 mi)	Individual time trial	Alfredo Binda (ITA)
	23 May	Rest day			
14	24 May	Ferrara to Udine	242 km (150 mi)	Plain stage	Ettore Meini (ITA)
15	25 May	Udine to Bassano del Grappa	213 km (132 mi)	Plain stage	Ettore Meini (ITA)
16	26 May	Bassano del Grappa to Bolzano	148 km (92 mi)	Plain stage	Gerard Loncke (BEL)
	27 May	Rest day			
17	28 May	Bolzano to Milan	284 km (176 mi)	Stage with mountain(s)	Alfredo Binda (ITA)
Total		3,343 km (2,077 mi)			

== Classification leadership ==
The leader of the general classification – calculated by adding the stage finish times of each rider – wore a pink jersey. This classification is the most important of the race, and its winner is considered as the winner of the Giro. Race organizers chose to remove time bonuses for the sprint stage winners, the "winner for detachment," the first riders who cross a mountain. The winner of the individual time trial – where riders contest the course starting in three minute increments – awarded a time bonus of two minutes and one minute to the first and second-place finishers, respectively.

The race organizers allowed isolated riders to compete in the race, which had a separate classification calculated the same way as the general classification. For the first time, a white jersey was awarded for the leader of this classification.

In 1933, the Italian cycling organisation had two different types of licences for professional cyclists. The lower-ranked cyclists rode with a licence for 'indipendenti', and a special prize was given to the highest ranked rider amongst these riders in the general classification.

In the mountains classification, the race organizers selected different mountains that the route crossed and awarded points to the three riders who crossed them first. There were four mountains that were given points towards the mountains classification: the Passo del Tonale, the Osteria della Crocetta, the Castelnuovo della Daunia, and the Castelnuovo Val di Cecina. Alfredo Binda was the first rider to cross each of the four mountains.

The winner of the team classification was determined by adding the finish times of the best three cyclists per team together and the team with the lowest total time was the winner. If a team had fewer than three riders finish, they were not eligible for the classification.

Il Trofeo Magno (English: the Great Trophy) was a classification for independent Italian riders competing in the race. The riders were divided into teams based on the region of Italy they were from. The calculation of the standings was the same for the team classification. At the end of the race, a trophy was awarded to the winning team and it was then stored at the Federal Secretary of the P.N.P. in their respective province.

The rows in the following table correspond to the jerseys awarded after that stage was run.

Stage	Winner	General classification	Best foreign rider	Best independent rider	Best isolati rider	Mountains classification	Team classification	Il Trofeo Magno
1	Learco Guerra	Learco Guerra	Jef Demuysere	Camillo Erba	Renato Scorticati	not awarded	Ganna	Lombardia
2	Alfredo Binda	Alfredo Binda	Jef Demuysere	Carlo Moretti	Giovanni Cazzuliani	not awarded	Ganna	Lombardia
3	Learco Guerra	Alfredo Binda	Jef Demuysere	Carlo Moretti	Giovanni Cazzuliani	not awarded	Ganna	Lombardia
4	Giuseppe Olmo	Alfredo Binda	Jef Demuysere	Carlo Moretti	Giovanni Cazzuliani	not awarded	Ganna	Lombardia
5	Learco Guerra	Jef Demuysere	Jef Demuysere	Carlo Moretti	Giovanni Cazzuliani	Alfredo Binda	Legnano	Lombardia
6	Mario Cipriani	Jef Demuysere	Jef Demuysere	Carlo Moretti	Camillo Erba	Alfredo Binda	Legnano	Piemonte
7	Gerard Loncke	Jef Demuysere	Jef Demuysere	Carlo Moretti	Camillo Erba	Alfredo Binda	Legnano	Piemonte
8	Alfredo Binda	Alfredo Binda	Jef Demuysere	Carlo Moretti	Marco Giuntelli	Alfredo Binda	Legnano	Piemonte
9	Alfredo Binda	Alfredo Binda	Jef Demuysere	Carlo Moretti	Camillo Erba	Alfredo Binda	Legnano	Lombardia
10	Alfredo Binda	Alfredo Binda	Jef Demuysere	Carlo Moretti	Antonio Folco	Alfredo Binda	Legnano	Piemonte
11	Fernand Cornez	Alfredo Binda	Jef Demuysere	Carlo Moretti	Antonio Folco	Alfredo Binda	Legnano	Piemonte
12	Giuseppe Olmo	Alfredo Binda	Jef Demuysere	Carlo Moretti	Antonio Folco	Alfredo Binda	Legnano	Piemonte
13	Alfredo Binda	Alfredo Binda	Jef Demuysere	Carlo Moretti	Camillo Erba	Alfredo Binda	Legnano	Piemonte
14	Ettore Meini	Alfredo Binda	Jef Demuysere	Carlo Moretti	Camillo Erba	Alfredo Binda	Legnano	Piemonte
15	Ettore Meini	Alfredo Binda	Jef Demuysere	Carlo Moretti	Camillo Erba	Alfredo Binda	Legnano	Piemonte
16	Gerard Loncke	Alfredo Binda	Jef Demuysere	Carlo Moretti	Camillo Erba	Alfredo Binda	Legnano	Piemonte
17	Alfredo Binda	Alfredo Binda	Jef Demuysere	Carlo Moretti	Camillo Erba	Alfredo Binda	Legnano	Piemonte
Final		Alfredo Binda	Jef Demuysere	Carlo Moretti	Camillo Erba	Alfredo Binda	Legnano	Piemonte

== Final standings ==
Legend
A pink jersey	Denotes the winner of the General classification

=== General classification ===
Final general classification (1–10)
Rank	Name	Team	Time
1	Alfredo Binda (ITA)	Legnano	111h 42' 41"
2	Jef Demuysere (BEL)	Ganna	+ 12' 34"
3	Domenico Piemontesi (ITA)	Gloria	+ 16' 31"
4	Alfredo Bovet (ITA)	Bianchi	+ 19' 47"
5	Allegro Grandi (ITA)	Dei	+ 21' 33"
6	Carlo Moretti (ITA)	Dei	+ 26' 16"
7	Ludwig Geyer (GER)	Legnano	+ 27' 17"
8	Kurt Stöpel (GER)	Legnano	+ 28' 22"
9	Mario Cipriani (ITA)	Ganna	+ 30' 28"
10	Camillo Erba (ITA)	—	+ 30' 30"

=== Foreign rider classification ===
Final foreign rider classification (1–10)
Rank	Name	Team	Time
1	Jef Demuysere (BEL)	Ganna	111h 14' 26"
2	Ludwig Geyer (GER)	Legnano	+ 14' 43"
3	Kurt Stöpel (GER)	Legnano	+ 15' 48"
4	René Vietto (FRA)	Olympia	+ 42' 43"
5	Karl Altenburger (GER)	Olympia	+ 49' 43"
6	Hermann Buse (GER)	Olympia	+ 51' 36"
7	Gérard Loncke (BEL)	Ganna	+ 1h 04' 10"
8	Isidro Figueras (ESP)	Bestetti	+ 1h 15' 10"
9	Marcel Bidot (FRA)	Dei	+ 1h 17' 56"
10	Fernand Cornez (FRA)	Dei	+ 1h 23' 01"

=== Independent rider classification ===
Final independent rider classification (1–10)
Rank	Name	Time
1	Carlo Moretti (ITA)	111h 28' 06"
2	Camillo Erba (ITA)	+ 4' 14"
3	Antonio Folco (ITA)	+ 4' 39"
4	Carlo Romanatti (ITA)	+ 6' 28"
5	Armando Zucchini (ITA)	+ 13' 50"
6	Nino Sella (ITA)	+ 15' 01"
7	Marco Giuntelli (ITA)	+ 17' 19"
8	Carlo Rovida (ITA)	+ 17' 37"
9	Orlando Teani (ITA)	+ 30' 33"
10	Bernardo Rogora (ITA)	+ 32' 06"

=== Isolati rider classification ===
Final isolati rider classification (1–10)
Rank	Name	Time
1	Camillo Erba (ITA)	111h 32' 22"
2	Antonio Folco (ITA)	+ 25"
3	Carlo Romanatti (ITA)	+ 2' 14"
4	Armando Zucchini (ITA)	+ 9' 36"
5	Marco Giuntelli (ITA)	+ 13' 05"
6	Renato Scorticati (ITA)	+ 24' 27"
7	Orlando Teani (ITA)	+ 26' 19"
8	Decimo Dell'Arsina (ITA)	+ 29' 45"
9	Cesare Facciani (ITA)	+ 30' 06"
10	Guglielmo Segato (ITA)	+ 43' 54"

=== Mountains classification ===
Final mountains classification (1–5)
Rank	Name	Team	Points
1	Alfredo Binda (ITA)	Legnano	12
2	Alfredo Bovet (ITA)	Bianchi	4
3	Remo Bertoni (ITA)	Bianchi	3
4	Carlo Moretti (ITA)	Dei	2
5	Jef Demuysere (BEL)	Ganna	1
5	Vicente Trueba (ESP)	Bestetti	1
5	René Vietto (FRA)	Olympia	1

=== Team classification ===
Final team classification (1–5)
Rank	Team	Time
1	Legnano	334h 01' 15"
2	Dei	+ 34' 16"
3	Bianchi	+ 53' 27"
4	Gloria	+ 1h 03' 07"
5	Ganna	+ 1h 04' 07"
6	Olympia	+ 1h 42' 52"

=== Il Trofeo Magno classification ===
Final Il Trofeo Magno classification (1–4)
Rank	Team	Time
1	Piemonte	334h 01' 15"
2	Lombardia	+ 24' 41"
3	Emilia	+ 54' 36"
4	Toscana	+ 1h 09' 52"
