= Alfredo Bovet =

Swiss-Italian cyclist

Personal information
- Full name: Alfredo Bovet
- Born: 6 May 1909 Cully, Switzerland
- Died: 18 January 1993 (aged 83) Renens, Switzerland

Cycling career
- Sport: Cycling
- Discipline: Road
- Role: Rider

Professional teams
- 1930: Touring-Pirelli
- 1930: Bianchi-Pirelli
- 1933-1936: Bianchi
- 1938: Dei
- 1946: Olmo-Fugor

Major wins
- Milan–San Remo (1932)

Alfredo Bovet (6 May 1909, in Cully, Switzerland – 18 January 1993, in Renens, Switzerland) was a Swiss-born Italian cyclist. His brother Enrico Bovet was also a professional cyclist.

== Palmares ==
1932
1st overall Milan–San Remo
2nd overall Tre Valli Varesine
2nd overall Great Land Price

1933
1st of stage 3, stage 9 and general classification Volta a Catalunya
1st overall Tre Valli Varesine
2nd overall Milan–San Remo
3rd Italian National Road Race Championships
4th overall Giro d'Italia

1938
3rd overall Milan–San Remo
