= Henri Garnier =

Belgian cyclist

- Garnier in 1935

Personal information
- Born: 19 September 1908 Feschaux, Belgium
- Died: 4 January 2003 (aged 94)

Cycling career
- Sport: Cycling
- Discipline: Road
- Role: Rider

Professional teams
- 1933: Alcyon–Dunlop
- 1934: Thomann–Dunlop
- 1935: F. Pelissier–Hutchinson
- 1936–1937: France Sport, Allegro

Henri Garnier (19 September 1908 – 4 January 2003) was a Belgian professional road cyclist. He won the 1936 Tour de Suisse.

== Major results ==
1934
7th Overall Tour de Suisse
1935
2nd Overall Tour of Belgium
3rd Overall Tour de Suisse
3rd GP de la Famenne
1936
1st Overall Tour de Suisse

1st Mountains classification
1st Stage 1

4th Overall Tour of Belgium
1937
8th La Flèche Wallonne
10th Liège–Bastogne–Liège
