= Jean Driancourt =

French cyclist

Personal information
- Born: 1 January 1908
- Died: 4 April 1989 (aged 81)

Cycling career
- Sport: Cycling
- Discipline: Road
- Role: Rider

Jean Driancourt (1 January 1908 – 4 April 1989) was a French racing cyclist. He rode in the 1933 Tour de France.
