= 1932 Milan–San Remo =

Race details
- Dates: 20 March 1932
- Stages: 1
- Distance: 284.5 km (176.8 mi)
- Winning time: 8h 15' 45"

Results
	Winner	Alfredo Bovet (ITA)
	Second	Alfredo Binda (ITA)
	Third	Michele Mara (ITA)

The 1932 Milan–San Remo was the 25th edition of the Milan–San Remo cycle race and was held on 20 March 1932. The race started in Milan and finished in San Remo. The race was won by Alfredo Bovet.

== General classification ==
Final general classification

Rank	Rider	Time
1	Alfredo Bovet (ITA)	8h 15' 45"
2	Alfredo Binda (ITA)	+ 3' 00"
3	Michele Mara (ITA)	+ 3' 00"
4	Leonida Frascarelli (ITA)	+ 3' 00"
5	Luigi Barral (ITA)	+ 3' 00"
6	Raffaele di Paco (ITA)	+ 6' 15"
7	Charles Pélissier (FRA)	+ 6' 15"
8	Antonio Pesenti (ITA)	+ 6' 15"
9	Agostino Bellandi (ITA)	+ 6' 15"
10	Michele Orecchia (ITA)	+ 6' 15"
