= 1933 Tour de Suisse =

Race details
- Dates: 28 August–2 September 1933
- Stages: 5
- Distance: 1,253 km (778.6 mi)
- Winning time: 39h 46' 46"

Results
	Winner	Max Bulla (AUT)
	Second	Albert Büchi (SUI)
	Third	Gaspard Rinaldi (FRA)

The 1933 Tour de Suisse was the inaugural edition of the Tour de Suisse cycle race and was held from 28 August to 2 September 1933. The race started and finished in Zürich. The race was won by Max Bulla.

== General classification ==
Final general classification

Rank	Rider	Time
1	Max Bulla (AUT)	39h 46' 46"
2	Albert Büchi (SUI)	+ 9' 01"
3	Gaspard Rinaldi (FRA)	+ 11' 10"
4	Benoît Faure (FRA)	+ 16' 40"
5	Felice Gremo (ITA)	+ 19' 38"
6	François Adam (BEL)	+ 22' 11"
7	Carlo Romanatti (ITA)	+ 26' 04"
8	Michele Orecchia (ITA)	+ 28' 01"
9	Walter Blattmann (SUI)	+ 30' 20"
10	Hermann Buse (GER)	+ 30' 59"
