= Edmond Berenger =

French cyclist

Personal information
- Born: 16 December 1905
- Died: 18 April 1993 (aged 87)

Cycling career
- Sport: Cycling
- Discipline: Road
- Role: Rider

Edmond Berenger (16 December 1905 – 18 April 1993) was a French racing cyclist. He rode in the 1933 Tour de France.
