= 1938 Milan–San Remo =

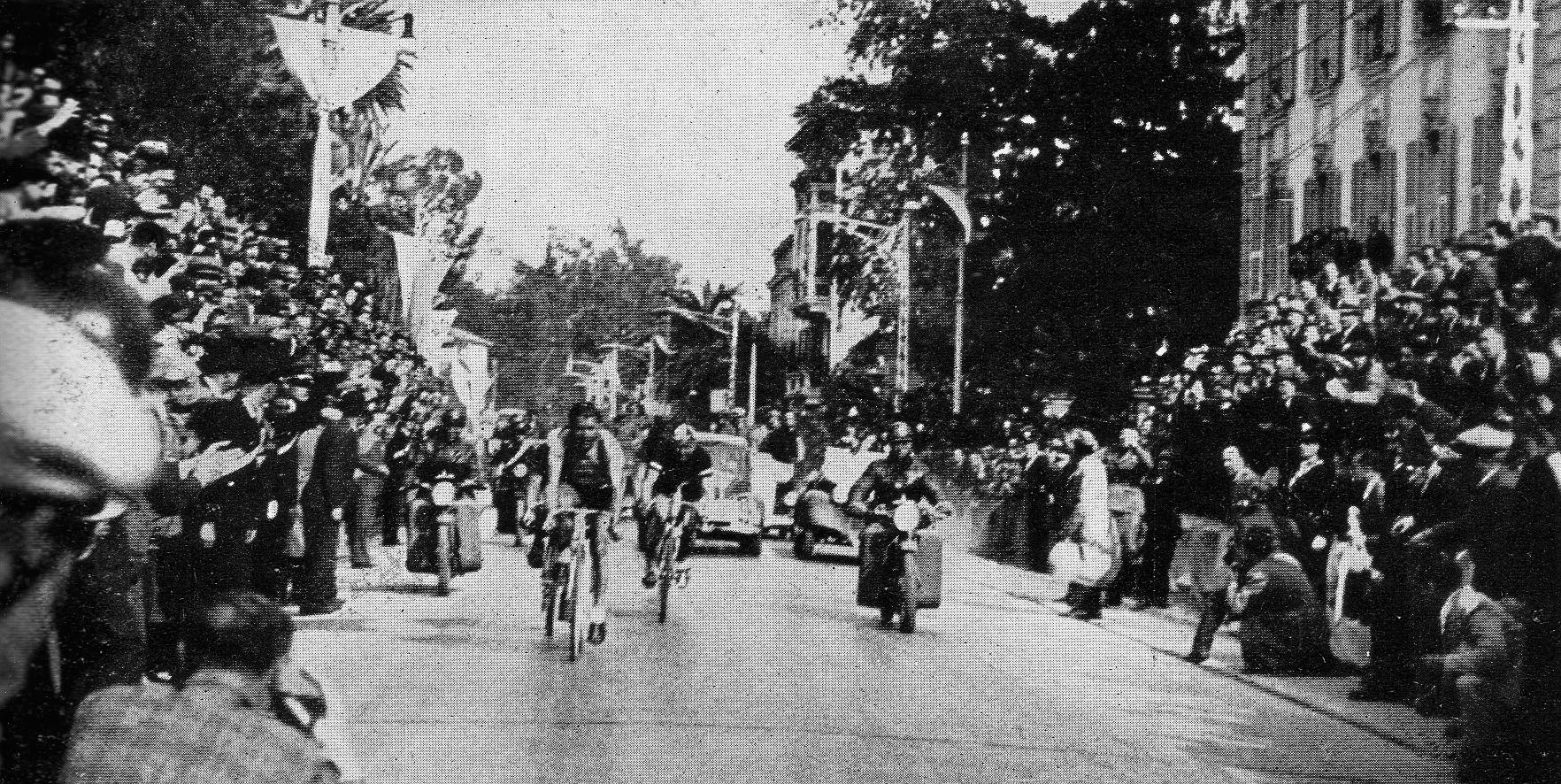
- The arrival at Corso Cavallotti in Sanremo, in March 1938

Race details
- Dates: 19 March 1938
- Stages: 1
- Distance: 281.5 km (174.9 mi)
- Winning time: 7h 18' 30"

Results
	Winner	Giuseppe Olmo (ITA)	(Bianchi)
	Second	Pierino Favalli (ITA)	(Legnano)
	Third	Alfredo Bovet (ITA)	(Dei)

The 1938 Milan–San Remo was the 31st edition of the Milan–San Remo cycle race and was held on 19 March 1938. The race started in Milan and finished in San Remo. The race was won by Giuseppe Olmo of the Bianchi team.

== General classification ==
Final general classification

Rank	Rider	Team	Time
1	Giuseppe Olmo (ITA)	Bianchi	7h 18' 30"
2	Pierino Favalli (ITA)	Legnano	s.t.
3	Alfredo Bovet (ITA)	Dei	s.t.
4	Fabien Galateau (FRA)	Michard-Wolber	s.t.
5	Auguste Mallet (FRA)	Helyett–Hutchinson	s.t.
6	Aldo Bini (ITA)	Bianchi	+ 1' 00"
7	Gino Bartali (ITA)	Legnano	s.t.
8	Osvaldo Bailo (ITA)	Bianchi	s.t.
9	Adriano Vignoli (ITA)	Bianchi	s.t.
10	Olimpio Bizzi (ITA)	Fréjus	s.t.
