= 1931 UCI Road World Championships =

- Venue: Copenhagen, Denmark
- Date: 26 August 1931
- Coordinates: 55°40′N 12°34′E
- Events: 2

The 1931 UCI Road World Championships was the eleventh edition of the UCI Road World Championships.

The championship took place on Wednesday, August 26 in Copenhagen, Denmark. Unusually, the race was not run as a traditional road race, but rather as an individual time-trial.

17 professional cyclists, with a maximum of 3 for each country, started from 7 am.

The amateur road race started after the professional road race. The winner was ultimately the Dane Henry Hansen, who was three minutes faster than the world champion among the professionals. But due to organizational irregularities, that time may not be reliable.

The 1931 UCI Track Cycling World Championships was held in the velodrome of Ordrup, near Copenhagen, from 21 to 30 August 1931.

== Events Summary ==
| Event | Gold | | Silver | | Bronze | |
|---|---|---|---|---|---|---|
Men's Events
| Professional Road Race | Learco Guerra; Italy | 4h 53' 43"; Media 34,727 km/h | Ferdinand le Drogo; France | + 4' 37" | Albert Büchi; Switzerland | + 4' 48" |
| Amateur Road Race | Henry Hansen; Denmark | - | Giuseppe Olmo; Italy | - | Leo Nielsen; Denmark | - |
