= Roger Strebel =

Swiss cyclist

Personal information
- Born: 29 March 1908 Lausanne, Switzerland
- Died: 1 October 1981 (aged 73)

Cycling career
- Sport: Cycling
- Discipline: Road
- Role: Rider

Roger Strebel (29 March 1908 – 1 October 1981) was a Swiss racing cyclist. He rode in the 1933 Tour de France.
