= Renato Scorticati =

Italian cyclist

Personal information
- Born: 25 June 1908
- Died: 23 January 1978 (aged 69)

Cycling career
- Sport: Cycling
- Discipline: Road
- Role: Rider

Renato Scorticati (25 June 1908 – 23 January 1978) was an Italian racing cyclist. He rode in the 1933 Tour de France.
