= Eugène Le Goff =

French cyclist

Personal information
- Born: 2 September 1909
- Died: 17 March 1998 (aged 88)

Cycling career
- Sport: Cycling
- Discipline: Road
- Role: Rider

Eugène Le Goff (2 September 1909 – 17 March 1998) was a French racing cyclist. He rode in the 1933 Tour de France.
