= Auguste Monciero =

French cyclist

Personal information
- Born: 21 August 1908
- Died: 2 June 2001 (aged 92)

Cycling career
- Sport: Cycling
- Discipline: Road
- Role: Rider

Auguste Monciero (21 August 1908 – 2 June 2001) was a French racing cyclist. He rode in the 1933 Tour de France.
