= André Gaillot =

French cyclist (1907–1993)

Personal information
- Born: 4 March 1907 Grézac, France
- Died: 24 December 1993 (aged 86) La Rochelle, France

Cycling career
- Sport: Cycling
- Discipline: Road
- Role: Rider

André Gaillot (4 March 1907 – 24 December 1993) was a French racing cyclist. He rode in the 1933 Tour de France.
