= Pierre Pastorelli =

French cyclist

Personal information
- Born: 24 March 1910
- Died: 4 December 1981 (aged 71)

Cycling career
- Sport: Cycling
- Discipline: Road
- Role: Rider

Pierre Pastorelli (24 March 1910 – 4 December 1981) was a French racing cyclist. He rode in the 1933 Tour de France.
