= Adrien Buttafocchi =

French cyclist

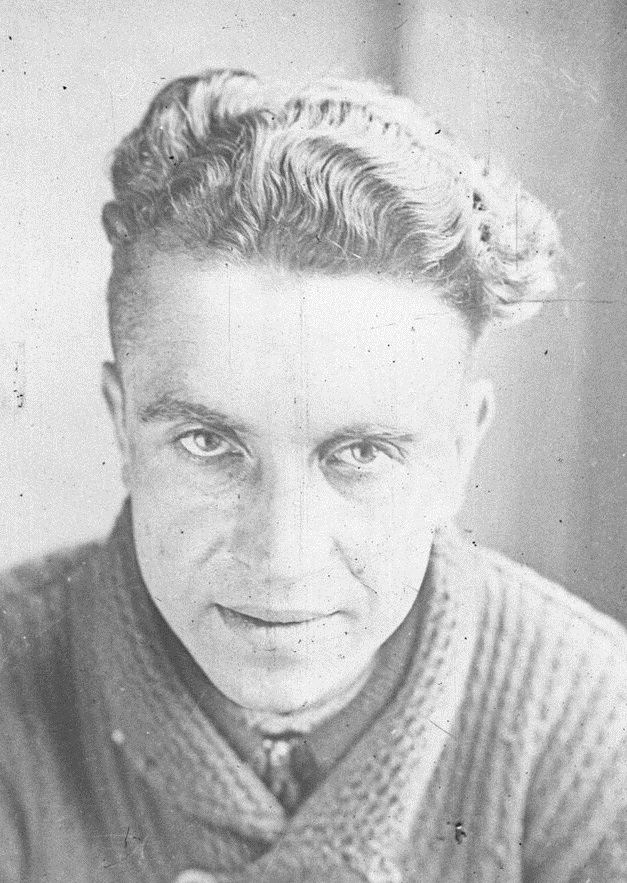

Personal information
- Born: 18 September 1907
- Died: 29 June 1937 (aged 29)

Cycling career
- Sport: Cycling
- Discipline: Road
- Role: Rider

Adrien Buttafocchi (18 September 1907 – 29 June 1937) was a French racing cyclist. He rode the Tour de France in 1931, 1932, 1933 and 1934, but he never finished one.
