= Georges Lemaire =

Belgian cyclist (1905–1933)

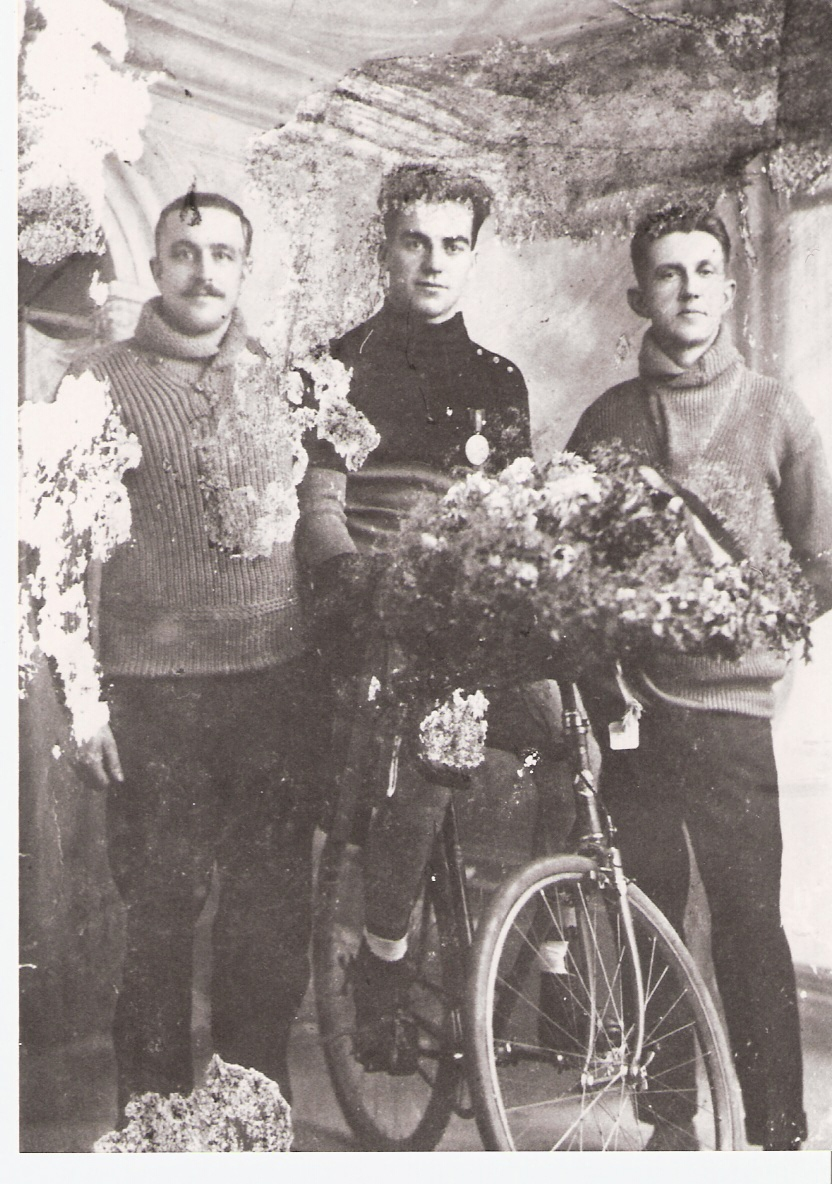
- Georges Lemaire (middle) surrounded by his cousin, Jean Nicolet, and his caretaker, 1933

Personal information
- Full name: Georges Lemaire
- Born: 3 April 1905 Pepinster, Belgium
- Died: 29 September 1933 (aged 28) Uccle, Belgium

Cycling career
- Sport: Cycling
- Discipline: Road
- Role: Rider

Professional teams
- 1932: Wendels-Jenatzy
- 1933: Depas

Georges Lemaire (3 April 1905, in Pepinster – 29 September 1933, in Uccle) was a Belgian professional road bicycle racer, who became Belgian road race champion in 1932. In 1933, he finished the Tour de France in 4th place, having worn the yellow jersey for two days. In September 1933, Lemaire made a fatal fall during the Belgian club championship.

== Palmarès ==
1929
Belgium National Championship, Road, Independents
1932
Brasschaat
Belgium National Championship, Road, Elite
1933
GP Stad Vilvoorde
