= Giuseppe Martano =

Italian cyclist (1910–1994)

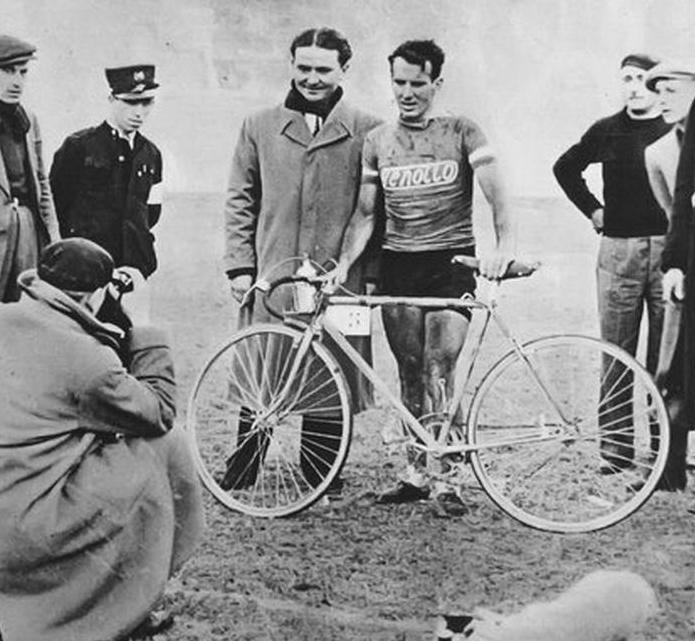
- Giuseppe Martano at the arrival of Milan-Turin in 1937 (winner of the event).

Personal information
- Born: 10 October 1910 Savona, Italy
- Died: 2 September 1994 (aged 83) Turin, Italy

Cycling career
- Sport: Cycling
- Discipline: Road
- Role: Rider

Professional teams
- 1930–1935: Frejus
- 1932: G.S. Spa Torino
- 1933: Individual
- 1936–1937: Bianchi
- 1937: Tendil
- 1938: Tendil–Hutchinson
- 1938–1939: Frejus
- 1939: France Sport–Wolber
- 1940: Olympia
- 1946–1948: Individual
Medal record
Men's road bicycle racing
Representing Italy
World Championships
Gold medal – first place	1930 Liège	Amateur's Road Race
Gold medal – first place	1932 Rome	Amateur's Road Race

Giuseppe Martano (Savona, 10 October 1910 — Turin, 2 September 1994) was an Italian professional road bicycle racer. Martano was twice world amateur champion. He reached the podium of the Tour de France twice, in 1933 (3rd place) and 1934 (2nd place), and in the Giro d'Italia once (1935).

== Major results ==
1929
1st Coppa Citta di Cuorgnè

1930
1st UCI Road World Championships (Amateurs)

1931
1st G.P. Giglio a Roma

1932
1st UCI Road World Championships (Amateurs)
National Road Championships

1st Road Race (Amateurs)
1st Road Race (Independents)

1st Overall Giro del Piemonte

1st Stage 1

3rd Milano–Torino

1933
3rd Overall Tour de France

1934
2nd Overall Tour de France

1st Stage 8

2nd Giro della Toscana
2nd Giro del Piemonte

1935
1st Overall Giro del Lazio

1st Stage 2

2nd Overall Giro d'Italia
2nd Giro della Toscana
3rd Giro di Campania
3rd Giro della Provincia Milano
10th Milan–San Remo

1937
1st Milano–Torino
1st GP de Cannes
1st Stages 3 & 4b Paris–Nice

1939
3rd Overall Lyon–Grenoble–Lyon
