= Ludwig Geyer (cyclist) =

German cyclist

Personal information
- Born: August 18, 1904 Hambach
- Died: January 31, 1992 (aged 87) Pirmasens

Cycling career
- Sport: Cycling
- Discipline: Road
- Role: Rider, Team manager

Professional teams
- 1928-1929: individual
- 1930: Dunlop
- 1931: Faggi
- 1931-1932: Opel
- 1932: Atala
- 1933: Legnano
- 1933-1934: Oscar Egg
- 1934-1937: Diamant
- 1937: Dei
- 1938-1939: Diamant
- 1946: Individual

Managerial teams
- 1958: Torpedo
- 1966: Torpedo

Major wins
- Tour de Suisse (1934)

Ludwig Geyer (August 18, 1904, in Hambach – January 31, 1992 in Pirmasens) was a German cyclist. He won the Tour de Suisse in 1934.

== Major results ==
1929
2nd Tour de Berne
2nd Züri-Metzgete
1930
2nd stage Deutschland Tour
2nd Berlin-Cottbus-Berlin
1933
3rd Grand Prix de Vannes
3rd Paris–Tours
3rd Trophée des grimpeurs
4th Paris-Roubaix
5th Milan–San Remo
7th Giro d'Italia
1934
1st Tour de Suisse

4th stage

2nd Tour de Berlin
2nd German National Road Race Championships
7th Tour de France
1937
4th stage Deutschland Tour
2nd Deutschland Tour
1939
7th stage Deutschland Tour

== Grand tour results ==
=== Tour de France ===
- 1931: 19th
- 1932: 22nd
- 1933: 12th
- 1934: 7th
- 1937: 28th

=== Giro d'Italia ===
- 1932: 35th
- 1933: 7th
