= Fernand Cornez =

French cyclist

Personal information
- Full name: Fernand Cornez
- Born: 19 November 1907 Paris, France
- Died: 7 December 1997 (aged 90) Saint-Avertin, France

Cycling career
- Sport: Cycling
- Discipline: Road
- Role: Rider

Major wins
- One stage 1933 Tour de France; One stage 1933 Giro d'Italia

Fernand Cornez (19 November 1907 in Paris – 7 December 1997 in Saint-Avertin) was a French professional road bicycle racer.

In 1933, he won a stage in the Tour de France and in the Giro d'Italia.

== Major results ==
1933
Tour de France:

Winner stage 10

Giro d'Italia:

Winner stage 11

1934
GP de Cannes
