= Vicente Trueba =

Spanish cyclist (1905–1986)

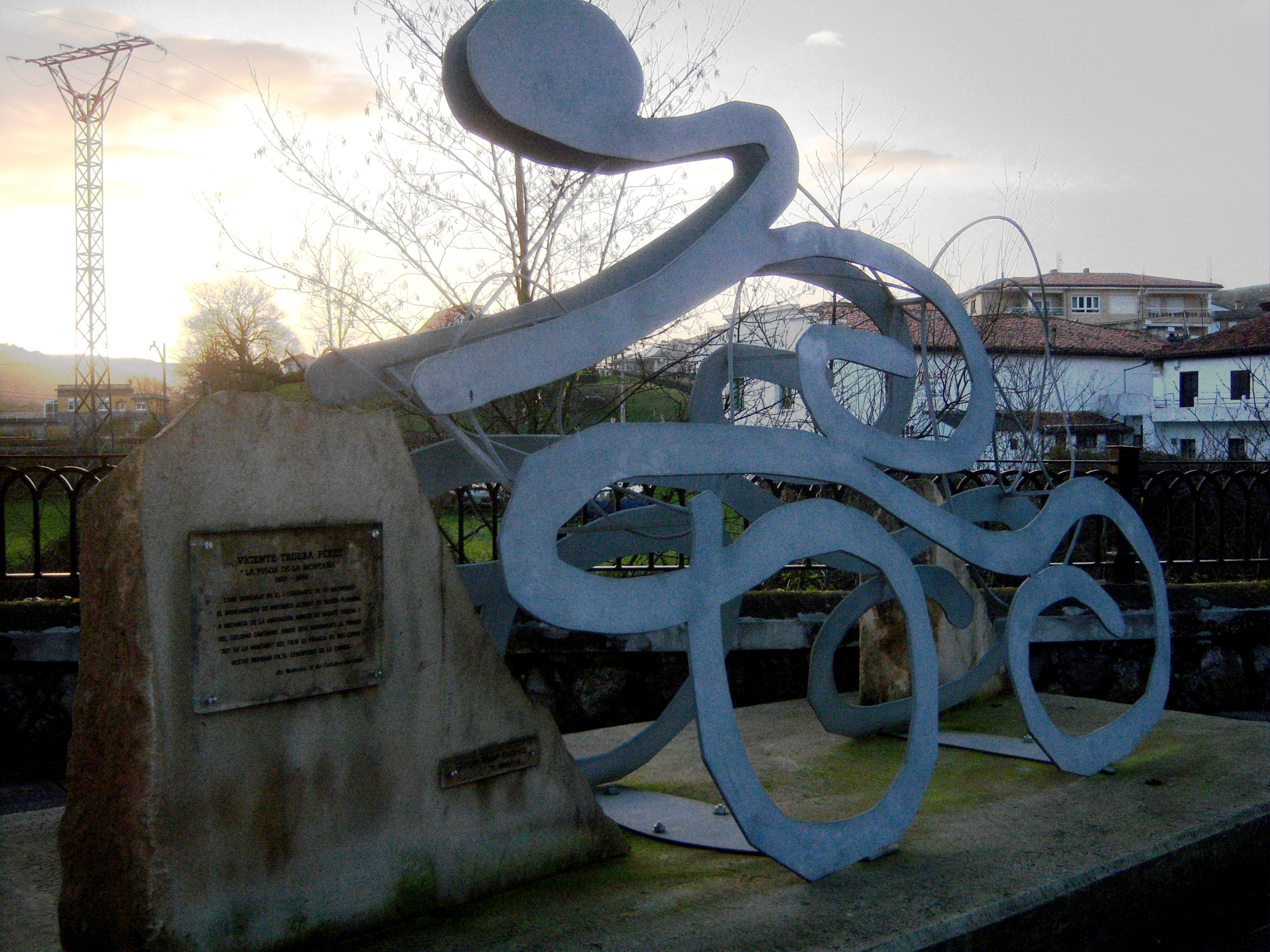

Personal information
- Full name: Vicente Trueba Pérez
- Nickname: The Flea of Torrelavega
- Born: October 16, 1905 Sierrapando, Spain
- Died: November 10, 1986 (aged 81)

Cycling career
- Sport: Cycling
- Discipline: Road
- Role: Cyclist
- Rider type: Climber specialist

Major wins
- First winner of King of the Mountains (1933)

Vicente Trueba Pérez (October 16, 1905 in Sierrapando, Torrelavega, Cantabria – November 10, 1986) was a Spanish professional road racing cyclist. He is most famous for being the first winner of King of the Mountains for winning the overall classification in the Mountains classification of Tour de France. He also finished sixth overall of Tour de France. His brother José was also a professional cyclist.

== 1933 Tour de France ==
In 1933, the King of the Mountains classification was first calculated. The winner was Vicente Trueba, who reached the tops of most mountains first. However, Trueba was a very bad descender, so he never gained anything from reaching the tops first. The Tour de France director, Henri Desgrange, decided that cyclists should receive a bonus for reaching the tops first.
