= Alfred Bula =

Swiss cyclist

Personal information
- Born: 6 March 1908
- Died: 17 December 1995 (aged 87)

Cycling career
- Sport: Cycling
- Discipline: Road
- Role: Rider

Alfred Bula (6 March 1908 – 17 December 1995) was a Swiss racing cyclist. He rode in the 1932 Tour de France.
