= Learco Guerra =

Italian cyclist (1902–1963)

Personal information
- Full name: Learco Guerra
- Nickname: Human Locomotive
- Born: 14 October 1902 Bagnolo San Vito, Italy
- Died: 7 February 1963 (aged 60) Milan, Italy

Cycling career
- Sport: Cycling
- Discipline: Road
- Role: Rider

Professional teams
- 1928–1935: Maino–Dunlop
- 1936–1939: Legnano–Wolsit
- 1940: Dei/Legnano
- 1941–1944: Dei

Major wins
- Grand Tours Tour de France 7 individual stages (1930, 1933) Giro d'Italia General classification (1934) 31 individual stages (1930-1937) One-day races and Classics World Road Race Championship (1931) National Road Race Championship (1930-1934) Milan–San Remo (1933) Giro di Lombardia (1934)
Medal record
Men's road bicycle racing
Representing Italy
World Championships
Gold medal – first place	1931 Copenhagen	Elite Men's Road Race
Silver medal – second place	1930 Liège	Elite Men's Road Race
Silver medal – second place	1934 Leipzig	Elite Men's Road Race

Learco Guerra (14 October 1902 – 7 February 1963) was an Italian professional road racing cyclist. The highlight of his career was his overall win in the 1934 Giro d'Italia. He was born in San Nicolò Po, a frazione of Bagnolo San Vito in Lombardy, gained the nickname of "Human Locomotive" for his enduring quality in plain stages. After mediocre attempts to play football, Guerra became a professional cyclist in 1928, at 26. The following year he became Italian champion, racing as an independent or semi-professional.

In 1930 he won his first Italian National Road Race Championships, the first of five straight wins. That same year he came second in the Tour de France after Italy's leader, Alfredo Binda, proved in poor form. The race was won by the Frenchman, André Leducq. In 1931 Guerra won four stages of the Giro d'Italia but not the final victory. In this Giro, he was the first rider who wore the pink jersey. The same year he won the world cycling championship.

In 1933 Guerra was again second in the Tour de France, and he won the Milan–San Remo. In 1934 came his greatest success, 10 stages of the Giro d'Italia and the general classification. He was also second in the world championship.

Guerra set a record of victories in a single year that was beaten only in the 1970s. His fame was exploited by the Fascist government, which profited from his heroic status.

After retirement, he worked as a team manager for riders such as Hugo Koblet and Charly Gaul.

Affected by Parkinson's disease, he died in Milan in 1963.

== Career achievements ==
=== Major results ===
1929
1st Coppa Appennino
1st Coppa Diamante
1st Roncoferraro
1st Vignola–Modena
2nd Coppa San Geo

1930
1st National Road Championships, Road Race
1st Circuito Monte Benici
1st Predappio Alta–Roma
1st Coppa Caivano
1st Stages 8 & 11 Giro d'Italia
1st Torino Criterium
2nd UCI Road World Championships, Road Race
2nd Overall Tour de France

1st Stages 2, 13 & 15

3rd Giro di Lombardia
8th Milan–San Remo

1931
1st UCI Road World Championships, Road Race
1st National Road Championships, Road Race
1st Giro della Provincia di Reggio Calabria
1st Corsa del Commercio
1st Coppa de la Victoria
1st Prix Dupré-Lapize
1st Stages 1, 2, 7 & 8 Giro d'Italia
2nd Milan–San Remo

1932
1st National Road Championships, Road Race
1st Giro di Campania
1st Giro della Toscana
1st Predappio Alta–Roma
1st Stages 1, 4, 6, 7, 9 & 13 Giro d'Italia
4th Grand Prix des Nations

1933
1st National Road Championships, Road Race
1st Milan–San Remo
1st Circuito Belfiore
1st Bologna Criterium
1st Corsa del Commercio
1st Prix Goullet-Fogler
1st Stages 1, 3 & 5 Giro d'Italia
2nd Overall Tour de France

1st Stages 2, 6, 7, 18 & 23

2nd Giro delle Due Province Messina
3rd Six Days of Paris

1934
1st National Road Championships, Road Race
1st Overall Giro d'Italia

1st Stages 2, 3, 4, 5, 6, 9, 10, 11, 12 & 14

1st Giro di Lombardia
1st GP Lugano
1st Milano–Modena
1st Giro di Campania
1st Giro del Piemonte
1st Corsa del Commercio
1st GP Valle Scrivia
1st Giro della Provincia Milano (with Domenico Piemontesi)
1st Roma–Napoli–Roma
1st Florence Criterium
1st Pavia Criterium
2nd UCI Road World Championships, Road Race
2nd Six Days of Paris
2nd Prix Goullet-Fogler Madison

1935
1st Milano–Modena
1st Giro della Romagna
1st Giro della Provincia Milano
1st Six Days of Antwerp
2nd Milan–San Remo
2nd Prix Houlier-Comès Madison
2nd Six Days of Paris
3rd Cossato Criterium
4th Overall Giro d'Italia

1st Stages 3, 4, 7, 8 & 10

1936
1st Overall Giro della Provincia Milano (with Gino Bartali)

1937
1st Corsa del Commercio
1st GP Lugano
1st Stage 9 Giro d'Italia
1st Cuneo Criterium
2nd Six Days of Paris
3rd Six Days of Brussels

1938
2nd Giro della Toscana
3rd Overall Giro di Campania

1939
2nd Copa España

1940
1st Circuito de Casalecchio di Reno

1942
1st National Track Championships, Individual Pursuit

=== Grand Tour general classification results timeline ===
Grand Tour	1930	1931	1932	1933	1934	1935	1936	1937
Giro d'Italia	—	DNF	4	DNF	1	4	DNF	DNF
Tour de France	2	—	—	2	—	—	—	—
Vuelta a España	—	—	—	—	—	—	—	—

Legend
—	Did not compete
DNF	Did not finish

== Bibliography ==
- Gregori, Claudio; Pastonesi, Marco (2022). Il grande Guerra [The great Guerra] (in Italian). Piverone (Turin), Italy: Mulatero Editore. ISBN 978-88-8986-982-6.

== See also ==
- Legends of Italian sport - Walk of Fame
