= Léon Level =

French cyclist

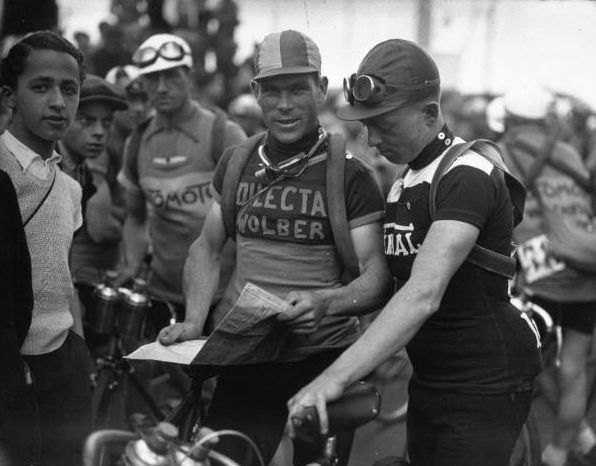
- Léon Level and André Godinat in Paris, France, 1934

Personal information
- Full name: Léon Level
- Nickname: Le Touriste
- Born: 12 July 1910 Hédouville, France
- Died: 26 March 1949 (aged 38) Paris, France

Cycling career
- Sport: Cycling
- Discipline: Road
- Role: Rider

Major wins
- One stage 1936 Tour de France

Léon Level (12 July 1910 in Hédouville – 26 March 1949 in Paris) was a French professional road bicycle racer.

== Major results ==
1933
Tour de France:

7th place overall classification

1935
Circuit du Mont-Blanc
Trophée des Grimpeurs
1936
Tour de France:

Winner stage 9
10th place overall classification
