= 1933 Tour de France =

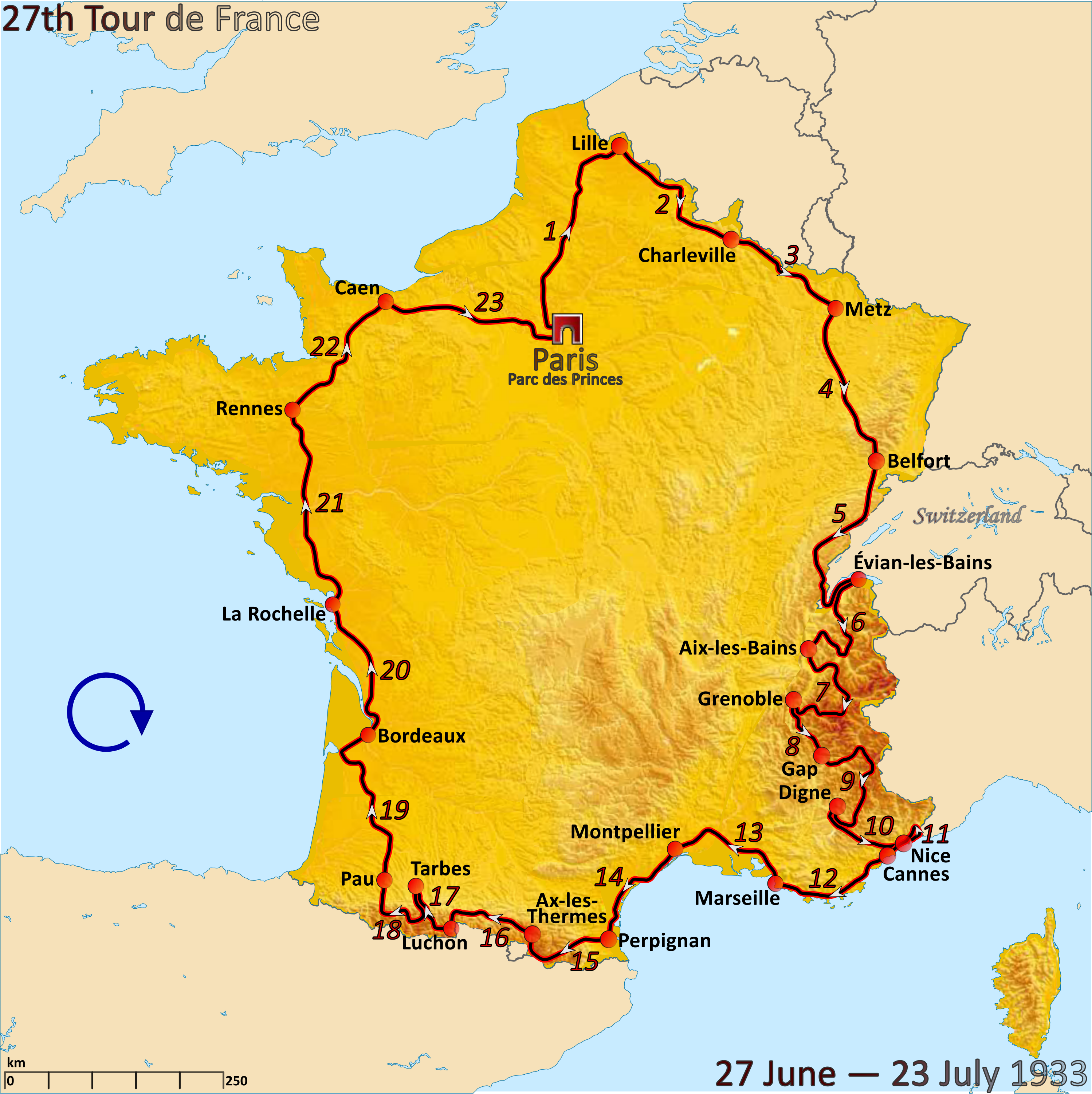
- Route of the 1933 Tour de France followed clockwise, starting in Paris

Race details
- Dates: 27 June – 23 July 1933
- Stages: 23
- Distance: 4,395 km (2,731 mi)
- Winning time: 147h 51' 37"

Results
Jersey awarded to the overall winner	Winner	Georges Speicher (FRA)	(France)
	Second	Learco Guerra (ITA)	(Italy)
	Third	Giuseppe Martano (ITA)	(Individual)
	Mountains	Vicente Trueba (ESP)	(Individual)
	Team	France	

The 1933 Tour de France was the 27th edition of the Tour de France, taking place from 27 June to 23 July. It consisted of 23 stages over 4,395 km (2,731 mi).

This race featured the introduction of the mountains competition, in which cyclists were challenged to climb the mountains the fastest, with points given to the fastest ascenders. This competition was won by Spaniard Vicente Trueba, who reached 9 of the 16 mountain peaks first.

The time bonus of two minutes had a large influence on the outcome of the race. Thanks to this bonus, Georges Speicher won the race; without the bonus, Italian Giuseppe Martano would have been the winner.

== Innovations and changes ==
In the 1932 Tour de France, the bonus system had had a major impact on the results: without these bonuses, the difference between the number one and number two would have been only three seconds, but with these bonuses, it became more than 24 minutes. In 1933, the bonus time was reduced: only the winner received two minutes of bonus time.

Since the 1913 Tour de France, the Tour de France had been counter-clockwise. In 1933, this changed, and the race was run clockwise again.

== Teams ==
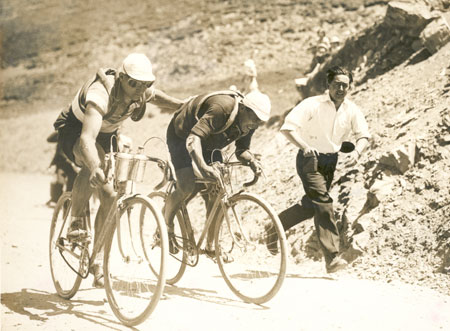
Georges Speicher and Leducq, two members of the French team in 1933.

Belgium, Italy, Switzerland, Germany and France entered national teams, consisting of eight cyclists (Les As). Additionally, 40 Les Individuels, cyclists without a team (including two Spaniards and an Austrian), entered the race.

Georges Ronsse, Learco Guerra, Albert Büchi, Kurt Stöpel and André Leducq were the captains of their respective teams.

== Pre-race favourites ==
The French team has been named the best collection of pre-war cyclists. The Belgian team had talented riders, but were split between French-speaking and Dutch-speaking cyclists. The Italian team was headed by Learco Guerra. Guerra had won three stages in the 1933 Giro d'Italia and had been world champion. Tour director Henri Desgrange had named Guerra as probable winner of the race.

== Route and stages ==
The highest point of elevation in the race was 2,556 m (8,386 ft) at the summit tunnel of the Col du Galibier mountain pass on stage 7.

Stage characteristics and winners
Stage	Date	Course	Distance	Type (Note: In 1933, there was no distinction in the rules between plain stages and mountain stages; the icons shown here indicate whether the stage included mountains that counted for the mountains classification.)	Winner
1	27 June	Paris to Lille	262 km (163 mi)	Plain stage	Maurice Archambaud (FRA)
2	28 June	Lille to Charleville	192 km (119 mi)	Plain stage	Learco Guerra (ITA)
3	29 June	Charleville to Metz	166 km (103 mi)	Plain stage	Alfons Schepers (BEL)
4	30 June	Metz to Belfort	220 km (140 mi)	Stage with mountain(s)	Jean Aerts (BEL)
5	1 July	Belfort to Evian	293 km (182 mi)	Stage with mountain(s)	Léon Louyet (BEL)
6	3 July	Evian to Aix-les-Bains	207 km (129 mi)	Stage with mountain(s)	Learco Guerra (ITA)
7	4 July	Aix-les-Bains to Grenoble	229 km (142 mi)	Stage with mountain(s)	Learco Guerra (ITA)
8	5 July	Grenoble to Gap	102 km (63 mi)	Stage with mountain(s)	Georges Speicher (FRA)
9	6 July	Gap to Digne	227 km (141 mi)	Stage with mountain(s)	Georges Speicher (FRA)
10	7 July	Digne to Nice	156 km (97 mi)	Plain stage	Fernand Cornez (FRA)
11	9 July	Nice to Cannes	128 km (80 mi)	Stage with mountain(s)	Maurice Archambaud (FRA)
12	10 July	Cannes to Marseille	208 km (129 mi)	Plain stage	Georges Speicher (FRA)
13	11 July	Marseille to Montpellier	168 km (104 mi)	Plain stage	André Leducq (FRA)
14	12 July	Montpellier to Perpignan	166 km (103 mi)	Plain stage	André Leducq (FRA)
15	14 July	Perpignan to Ax-les-Thermes	158 km (98 mi)	Stage with mountain(s)	Jean Aerts (BEL)
16	15 July	Ax-les-Thermes to Luchon	165 km (103 mi)	Stage with mountain(s)	Léon Louyet (BEL)
17	16 July	Luchon to Tarbes	91 km (57 mi)	Stage with mountain(s)	Jean Aerts (BEL)
18	17 July	Tarbes to Pau	185 km (115 mi)	Stage with mountain(s)	Learco Guerra (ITA)
19	19 July	Pau to Bordeaux	233 km (145 mi)	Plain stage	Jean Aerts (BEL)
20	20 July	Bordeaux to La Rochelle	183 km (114 mi)	Plain stage	Jean Aerts (BEL)
21	21 July	La Rochelle to Rennes	266 km (165 mi)	Plain stage	Jean Aerts (BEL)
22	22 July	Rennes to Caen	169 km (105 mi)	Plain stage	René Le Grevès (FRA)
23	23 July	Caen to Paris	222 km (138 mi)	Plain stage	Learco Guerra (ITA)
	Total		4,395 km (2,731 mi)		

== Race overview ==
On 27 June 1933, the Tour de France was started by Josephine Baker. The French team, that had won the last three Tours de France, started well. Maurice Archambaud won the first stage, and lead the general classification until the Alps. In the third stage, French sprinter Charles Pélissier, who had already won 13 Tour stages in his career, hit a car. He continued the race, but was injured, and finished behind the time limit.

Until the eighth stage, the battle for the lead was between Archambaud and Learco Guerra. In that eighth stage, French cyclist Georges Speicher asked permission to his team leader Archambaud if he could go for the stage win, and he could. He raced away, and won the stage.

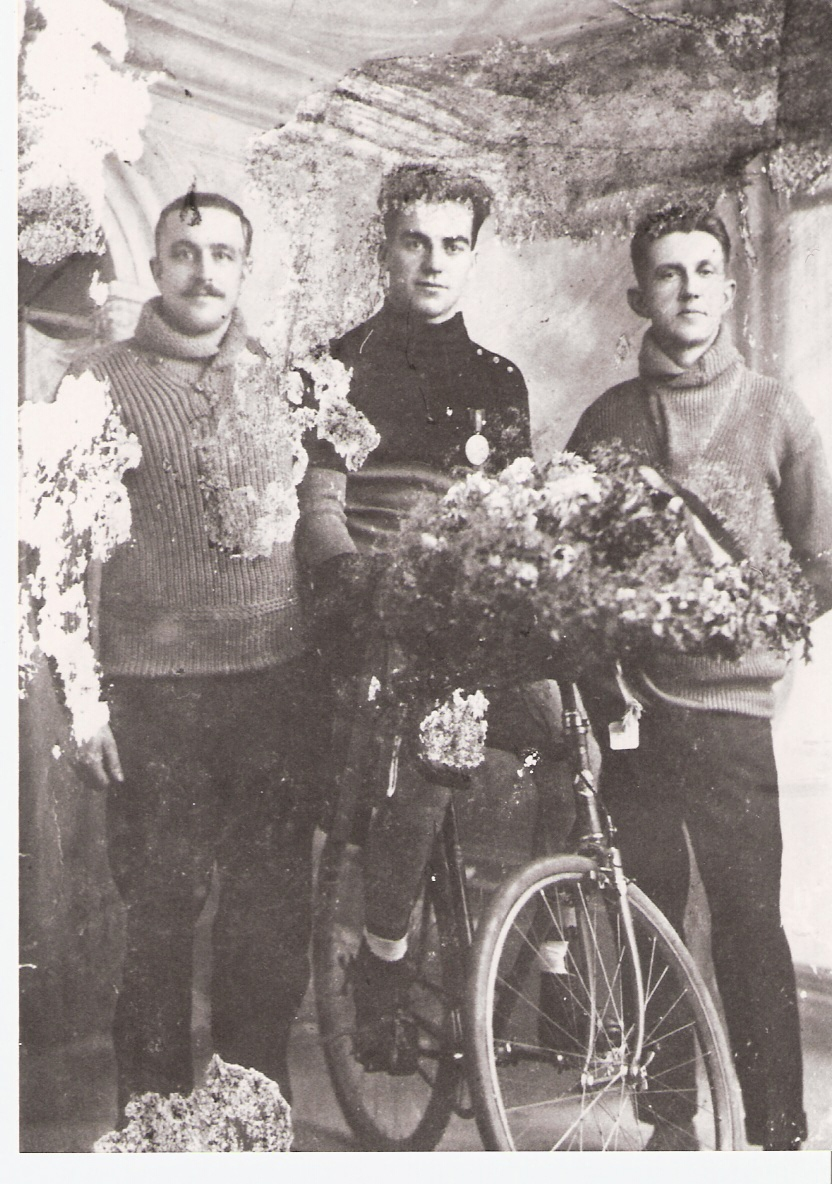
Georges Lemaire, the Belgian cyclist who led the race after stages 9 and 10.

In the mountains of the ninth stage, Archambaud could not compete with the rest. When Archambaud folded on the Allos, somebody else could take over the lead. The next cyclist in the General Classification, Guerra, had a flat tire, and could not win enough time. In the end, it was unknown Belgian Georges Lemaire who took over the lead. Guerra was only 23 seconds behind in the General Classification after that stage.

In stage 10, all but six cyclists finished more than 22 minutes after the winner. According to the rules, the cut-off time (the extra time that a cyclist can lose on the stage winner before he is taken out of the race) was 8% of the time of the stage winner. That rule would have put everybody but these six cyclists out of the race. Because of this, the Tour director Henri Desgrange extended the cut-off time for this stage to 10%, in this way 43 cyclists stayed in the race.

In the eleventh stage, the cut-off time was 10%. This would take four cyclists out of the race, but for them the cut-off time was increased to 15%. One of these cyclists had been hit by a car from the Tour direction. Maurice Archambaud took back the lead after that stage thanks to the bonus time, but not for long, as he lost time in the next stage.

Georges Speicher led the race from stage 12 on. In the mountains, Speicher struggled. He was dropped many times on the climbs, but was a good descender and got back to the lead group every time. Lemaire initially stayed close to Speicher, and was only 15 seconds behind in the general classification. l'Equipe wrote that with the help of his Belgian team, Lemaire could have challenged Speicher for the overall victory, especially thanks to the help of Jean Aerts. But the Belgian team was still divided between the Dutch-speaking and French-speaking cyclists, and Jean Aerts did not help Lemaire but went for his own success.

In the 21st stage, the initial winner Le Grèves together with the initial second-placed cyclist Louyet were punished by the jury, because of irregular sprinting. They were set back to the 6th and 7th place, and Jean Aerts, who initially was third, was named the winner of the race.

In the 22nd stage, the winner of the race was determined by one lap in the velodrome. This had not been planned, but was done because when the first group with 28 cyclists reached the velodrome, the gates were still closed.

Before the last stage, Martano was in second place, and Guerra in third. This last stage was won by Guerra, and thanks to the bonus time of two minutes, Guerra took over the second place.

== Classification leadership and minor prizes ==
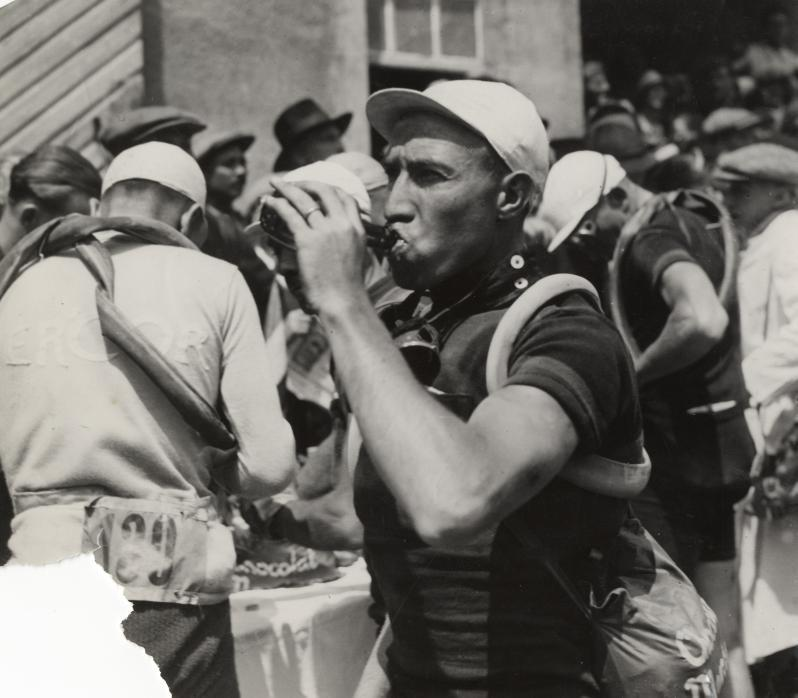
The Belgian cyclist Alphonse Schepers having a drink.

The time that each cyclist required to finish each stage was recorded, and these times were added together for the general classification. If a cyclist had received a time bonus, it was subtracted from this total; all time penalties were added to this total. The cyclist with the least accumulated time was the race leader, identified by the yellow jersey.

The bonus in the 1933 Tour de France were also decisive for the overall victory. Without the bonus of two minutes for the stage winner, Giuseppe Martano would have won the race. Speicher received six minutes for his three-stage victories and Guerra ten minutes for five victories, whereas Martano had received no bonus time.

The mountains classification in the Tour de France was calculated for the first time in 1933. There were 16 mountains in the route of the 1933 Tour de France, and for the first cyclists to reach the top of the mountain, points were given. The first on the top got 10 points, the second 9 points, and so on, until the tenth cyclist who received 1 point. In 1933, it was sponsored by Martini & Rossi.

For the fourth time, there was an official team competition, this time won by the French team. The team classification was calculated in 1933 by adding up the times of the best three cyclists of a team; the team with the least time was the winner.

All five teams finished with at least three cyclists, so all five teams were ranked in the final team classification.

Third-placed Giuseppe Martano became the winner of the "Les Individuels" category. This classification was calculated in the same way as the general classification, but only the cyclists riding as individuals were eligible.

Classification leadership by stage
Stage	Winner	General classification	Mountains classification (Note: No jersey was awarded to the leader of the mountains classification until a white jersey with red polka dots was introduced in 1975.)	Team classification	Classification for individuals
1	Maurice Archambaud	Maurice Archambaud	no award	Belgium	Léon Louyet
2	Learco Guerra	Maurice Archambaud	no award	Belgium	Louis Hardiquest
3	Alphonse Schepers	Maurice Archambaud	no award	Belgium	Louis Hardiquest
4	Jean Aerts	Maurice Archambaud	Vicente Trueba	Belgium	Louis Hardiquest
5	Léon Louyet	Maurice Archambaud	Vicente Trueba	Belgium	Louis Hardiquest
6	Learco Guerra	Maurice Archambaud	Vicente Trueba	Belgium	Gaspard Rinaldi
7	Learco Guerra	Maurice Archambaud	Vicente Trueba	Belgium	Gaspard Rinaldi
8	Georges Speicher	Maurice Archambaud	Vicente Trueba	France	Giuseppe Martano
9	Georges Speicher	Georges Lemaire	Vicente Trueba	France	Giuseppe Martano
10	Fernand Cornez	Georges Lemaire	Vicente Trueba	France	Giuseppe Martano
11	Maurice Archambaud	Maurice Archambaud	Vicente Trueba	France	Giuseppe Martano
12	Georges Speicher	Georges Speicher	Vicente Trueba	France	Giuseppe Martano
13	André Leducq	Georges Speicher	Vicente Trueba	France	Giuseppe Martano
14	André Leducq	Georges Speicher	Vicente Trueba	France	Giuseppe Martano
15	Jean Aerts	Georges Speicher	Vicente Trueba	France	Giuseppe Martano
16	Léon Louyet	Georges Speicher	Vicente Trueba	France	Giuseppe Martano
17	Jean Aerts	Georges Speicher	Vicente Trueba	France	Giuseppe Martano
18	Learco Guerra	Georges Speicher	Vicente Trueba	France	Giuseppe Martano
19	Jean Aerts	Georges Speicher	Vicente Trueba	France	Giuseppe Martano
20	Jean Aerts	Georges Speicher	Vicente Trueba	France	Giuseppe Martano
21	Jean Aerts	Georges Speicher	Vicente Trueba	France	Giuseppe Martano
22	René Le Grevès	Georges Speicher	Vicente Trueba	France	Giuseppe Martano
23	Learco Guerra	Georges Speicher	Vicente Trueba	France	Giuseppe Martano
Final		Georges Speicher	Vicente Trueba	France	Giuseppe Martano

== Final standings ==
=== General classification ===
Final general classification (1–10)
Rank	Rider	Team	Time
1	Georges Speicher (FRA)	France	147h 51' 37"
2	Learco Guerra (ITA)	Italy	+ 4' 01"
3	Giuseppe Martano (ITA)	Individual	+ 5' 08"
4	Georges Lemaire (BEL)	Belgium	+ 15' 45"
5	Maurice Archambaud (FRA)	France	+ 21' 22"
6	Vicente Trueba (ESP)	Individual	+ 27' 27"
7	Léon Level (FRA)	Individual	+ 35' 19"
8	Antonin Magne (FRA)	France	+ 36' 37"
9	Jean Aerts (BEL)	Belgium	+ 42' 53"
10	Kurt Stöpel (GER)	Germany/Austria	+ 45' 28"

Final general classification (11–40)
Rank	Rider	Team	Time
11	Fernand Fayolle (FRA)	Individual	+ 56' 11"
12	Ludwig Geyer (GER)	Germany/Austria	+ 57' 04"
13	Albert Büchi (SUI)	Switzerland	+ 1h 07' 59"
14	Gaston Rebry (BEL)	Belgium	+ 1h 20' 16"
15	Gaspard Rinaldi (FRA)	Individual	+ 1h 22' 12"
16	Eugène Le Goff (FRA)	Individual	+ 1h 24' 59"
17	Léon Le Calvez (FRA)	France	+ 1h 38' 44"
18	Alfons Schepers (BEL)	Belgium	+ 1h 39' 49"
19	René Le Grevès (FRA)	France	+ 1h 48' 31"
20	Alfred Büchi (SUI)	Switzerland	+ 1h 49' 59"
21	Decimo Bettini (ITA)	Individual	+ 1h 51' 51"
22	Émile Decroix (BEL)	Individual	+ 1h 52' 46"
23	Oskar Thierbach (GER)	Germany/Austria	+ 1h 55' 51"
24	Robert Brugère (FRA)	Individual	+ 2h 06' 44"
25	Alfred Bula (SUI)	Switzerland	+ 2h 12' 34"
26	Antoine Dignef (BEL)	Individual	+ 2h 15' 30"
27	Alfons Deloor (BEL)	Belgium	+ 2h 15' 48"
28	Luigi Giacobbe (ITA)	Italy	+ 2h 29' 19"
29	Roger Lapébie (FRA)	France	+ 2h 30' 37"
30	Walter Blattmann (SUI)	Switzerland	+ 2h 31' 35"
31	André Leducq (FRA)	France	+ 2h 39' 36"
32	Léon Louyet (BEL)	Individual	+ 2h 43' 14"
33	André Gaillot (FRA)	Individual	+ 2h 51' 50"
34	René Bernard (FRA)	Individual	+ 2h 54' 25"
35	Fernand Cornez (FRA)	Individual	+ 2h 58' 49"
36	Roger Pipoz (SUI)	Switzerland	+ 3h 05' 20"
37	Pierre Pastorelli (FRA)	Individual	+ 3h 15' 42"
38	Pierre Cloarec (FRA)	Individual	+ 3h 18' 30"
39	Vasco Bergamaschi (ITA)	Italy	+ 3h 42' 49"
40	Ernest Neuhard (FRA)	Individual	+ 3h 57' 44"

=== Mountains classification ===
Mountains in the mountains classification
Stage	Rider	Height	Mountain range	Winner
4	Ballon d'Alsace	1,178 metres (3,865 ft)	Vosges	Vicente Trueba
5	Faucille	1,323 metres (4,341 ft)	Jura	Antonin Magne
6	Aravis	1,498 metres (4,915 ft)	Alps	Alfons Schepers
7	Télégraphe	1,566 metres (5,138 ft)	Alps	Alfons Schepers
7	Galibier	2,556 metres (8,386 ft)	Alps	Vicente Trueba
8	Côte de Laffrey	900 metres (3,000 ft)	Alps	Francesco Camusso
9	Vars	2,110 metres (6,920 ft)	Alps	Vicente Trueba
9	Allos	2,250 metres (7,380 ft)	Alps	Fernand Fayolle
11	Braus	1,002 metres (3,287 ft)	Alps-Maritimes	Vicente Trueba
15	Puymorens	1,915 metres (6,283 ft)	Pyrenees	Antonin Magne
16	Col de Port	1,249 metres (4,098 ft)	Pyrenees	Vicente Trueba
16	Portet d'Aspet	1,069 metres (3,507 ft)	Pyrenees	Alfons Schepers
17	Peyresourde	1,569 metres (5,148 ft)	Pyrenees	Vicente Trueba
17	Aspin	1,489 metres (4,885 ft)	Pyrenees	Vicente Trueba
18	Tourmalet	2,115 metres (6,939 ft)	Pyrenees	Vicente Trueba
18	Aubisque	1,709 metres (5,607 ft)	Pyrenees	Vicente Trueba

Final mountains classification (1–10)
Rank	Rider	Team	Points (Note: The sources do not agree)
1	Vicente Trueba (ESP)	Individual	134 (126)
2	Antonin Magne (FRA)	France	81 (78)
3	Giuseppe Martano (ITA)	Individual	78 (75)
4	Léon Level (FRA)	Individual	54
5	Alfons Schepers (BEL)	Belgium	51
5	Gaspard Rinaldi (FRA)	Individual	51
7	Maurice Archambaud (FRA)	France	45
8	Eugène Le Goff (FRA)	Individual	44
9	Fernand Fayolle (FRA)	Individual	39
10	Albert Büchi (SUI)	Switzerland	33

=== Team classification ===
Final team classification
Rank	Team	Time
1	France	444h 32' 50"
2	Belgium	+ 1h 20' 56"
3	Germany/Austria	+ 2h 40' 24"
4	Switzerland	+ 4h 12' 33"
5	Italy	+ 5h 18' 10"

== Aftermath ==
For the 1933 UCI Road World Championships, that was held after the race, Tour de France winner Georges Speicher was initially not selected. Only after a French cyclist that had been selected dropped out, Speicher was brought in as a replacement at the last notice, and won the race. Speicher was the first cyclist to win the Tour de France and the World Championship in the same year.

The national team format that had been introduced in 1930, had in four races produced four French victories. The French audience was therefore greatly interested in the race, and the organising newspaper l'Auto had a record circulation of 854000.

== Bibliography ==
- Augendre, Jacques (2016). "Guide historique" [Historical guide] (PDF). Tour de France (in French). Paris: Amaury Sport Organisation. Archived (PDF) from the original on 17 August 2016.
- McGann, Bill; McGann, Carol (2006). The Story of the Tour de France: 1903–1964. Vol. 1. Indianapolis, IN: Dog Ear Publishing. ISBN 978-1-59858-180-5.
- Nauright, John; Parrish, Charles (2012). Sports Around the World: History, Culture, and Practice. Vol. 2. Santa Barbara, CA: ABC-CLIO. ISBN 978-1-59884-300-2.
