= Gaston Rebry =

Belgian cyclist (1905–1953)

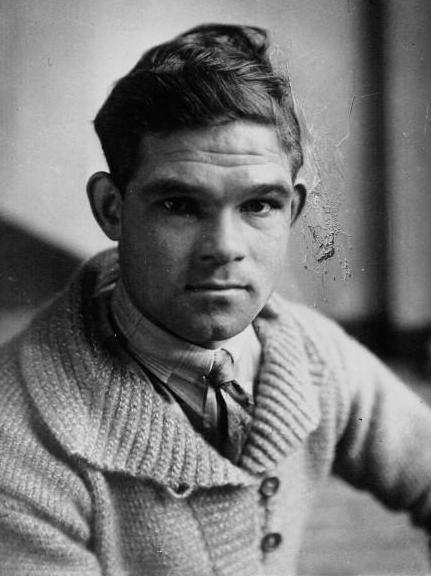
- Rebry at the 1929 Tour de France

Personal information
- Full name: Gaston Rebry
- Born: 29 January 1905 Rollegem-Kapelle, Belgium
- Died: 3 July 1953 (aged 48) Wevelgem, Belgium

Cycling career
- Sport: Cycling
- Discipline: Road
- Role: Rider

Major wins
- 4 stages Tour de France; Paris–Roubaix 1931, 1934–1935; Tour of Flanders 1934; Paris–Nice 1934

Gaston Rebry (29 January 1905 – 3 July 1953) was a Belgian champion road racing cyclist between 1928 and 1935.

In 1934, Rebry became the third of nine riders to win the Tour of Flanders and Paris–Roubaix in the same year; he also won Paris–Nice that year. Rebry won Paris–Roubaix three times. He also won four stages of the Tour de France.

His son, also named Gaston Rebry (1933–2007), too was a road-racing cyclist in the 1950s but moved to Canada in 1954 to become a landscape painter and died there on 5 January 2007.

== Major results ==
1926
3rd, Paris–Roubaix
1928
12th, Overall, Tour de France

1st, Stage 3, (Cherbourg - Dinan)

1929
10th, Overall, Tour de France

yellow jersey as leader of the general classification after stage 8
1st, Stage 14, (Nice - Grenoble)

1931
1st, Paris–Roubaix
4th, Overall, Tour de France

1st, Stage 23, (Charleville - Malo les Bains, 271 km)

1932
20th, Overall, Tour de France

1st, Stage 19, (Charleville - Malo les Bains, 271 km)

1933
14th, Overall, Tour de France
1934
1st, Paris–Roubaix
1st, Tour of Flanders
1st, Paris–Nice
1935
1st, Paris–Roubaix
