= Léon Louyet =

Belgian cyclist

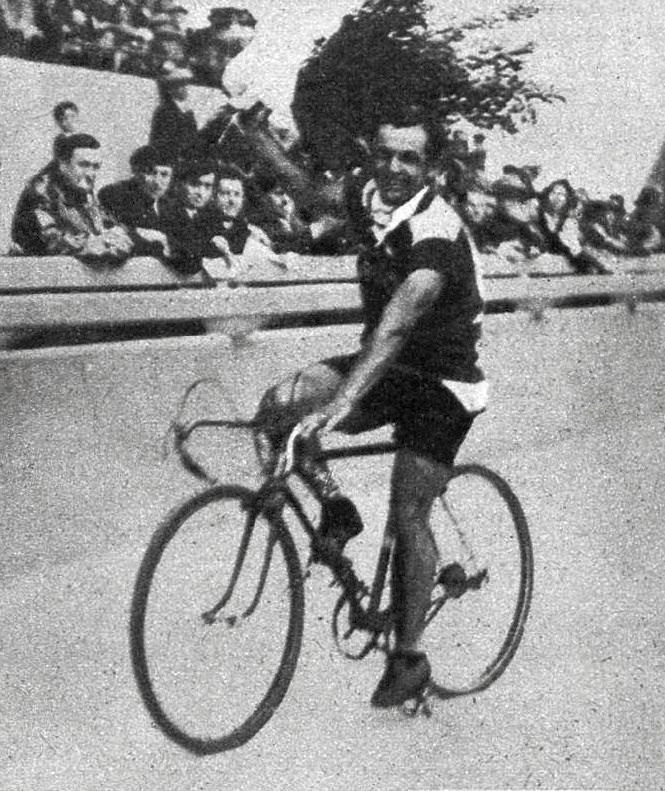

Personal information
- Full name: Léon Louyet
- Nickname: Le Poilu
- Born: 7 July 1906 Loos-en-Gohelle, France
- Died: 19 March 1973 (aged 66) Charleroi, Belgium

Cycling career
- Sport: Cycling
- Discipline: Road
- Role: Rider

Major wins
- two stages 1933 Tour de France

Léon Louyet (Loos-en-Gohelle, France, 7 July 1906 — Charleroi, 19 March 1973) was a Belgian professional road bicycle racer. In 1933 he won two stages in the Tour de France.

== Major results ==
1931
Belgium national road race championships for amateurs
Tour of Belgium for amateurs
1932
Tour of Belgium
1933
Paris - Poitiers
Paris - Vichy
Wegnez
Tour de France:

Winner stages 5 and 16
