= Gaspard Rinaldi =

French cyclist

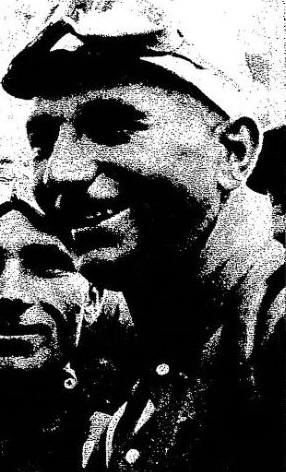
- Le Français Gaspard Rinaldi, vainqueur du Tour de Suisse début septembre 1935

Personal information
- Born: 26 May 1909 Cannes, France
- Died: 24 November 1978 (aged 69) Marseille, France

Cycling career
- Sport: Cycling
- Discipline: Road
- Role: Rider

Professional teams
- 1932: O. Egg
- 1933: Génial-Lucifer
- 1934: O. Egg
- 1936-1937: Helyett

Major wins
- Tour de Suisse (1935)

Gaspard Rinaldi (born 26 May 1909 in Cannes — 24 November 1978 in Marseille) was a French cyclist.

== Palmares ==
1929
2nd Marseille - Nice
1930
Marseille - Nice
Nice - Annot - Nice
Grand Prix de Cannes
1931
Nice
1933
4th stage Tour de Suisse
3rd Tour de Suisse
1935
Tour de Suisse
