= Albert Büchi =

Swiss cyclist

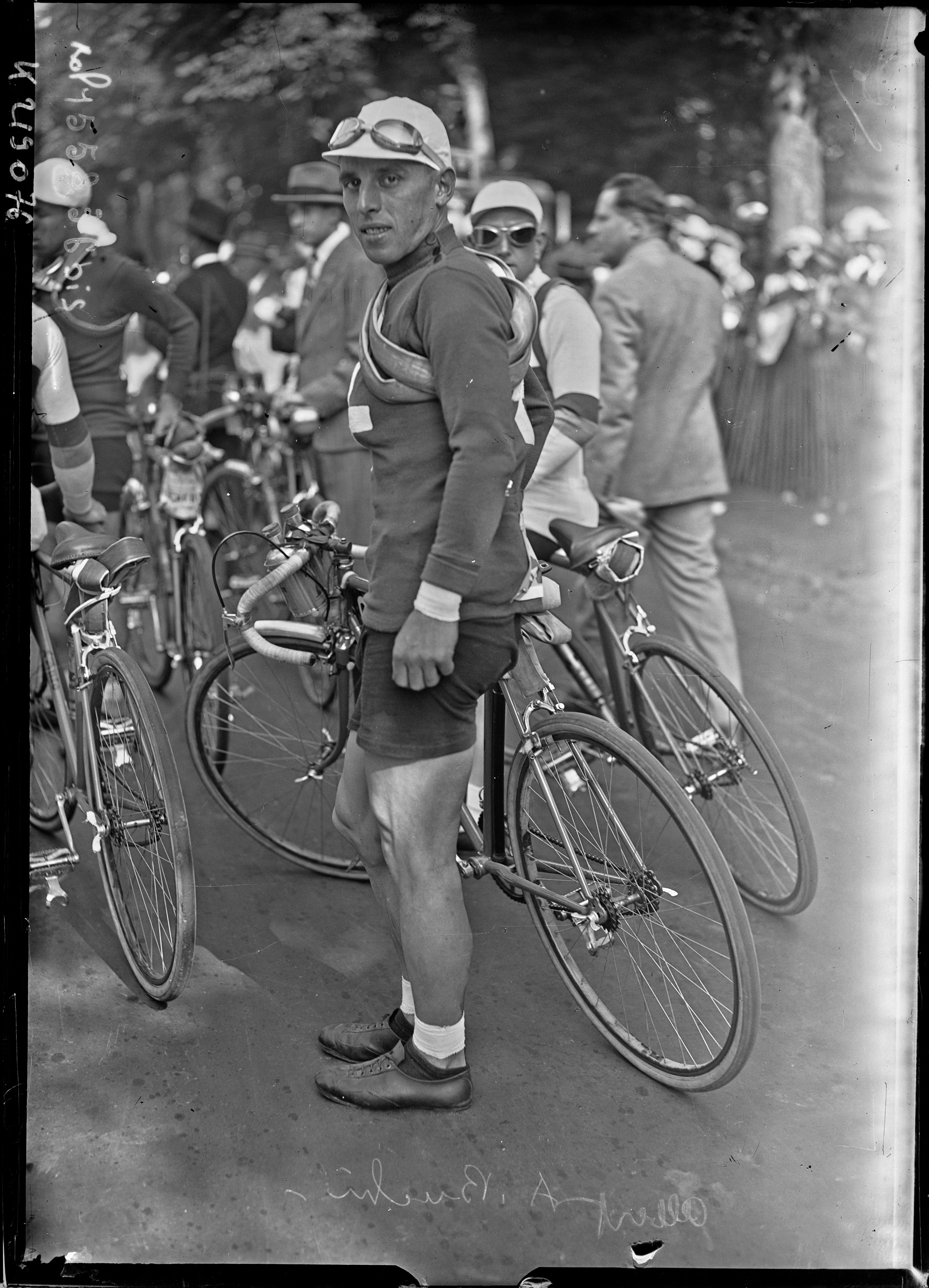

Personal information
- Born: 27 June 1907 Winterthur, Switzerland
- Died: August 1988 (aged 81)

Cycling career
- Sport: Cycling
- Discipline: Road
- Role: Rider
- Rider type: All-rounder

Albert Büchi
Medal record

Representing Switzerland

Men's road bicycle racing

World Championships
Bronze medal – third place	1931 Copenhagen	Elite Men's Road Race

Albert Büchi (27 June 1907 – August 1988) was a Swiss professional road bicycle racer. He is mainly known for his bronze medal in the Elite race of the 1931 Road World Championships. He was also the Swiss National Road Race champion in 1931.

== Major results ==
1930
Switzerland Amateur Road Race Champion
1931 - Oscar Egg
Switzerland Road Race Champion
1st, GP de l'Echo d'Alger
(bronze) World Road Race Championship
3rd, Züri-Metzgete
9th, Tour de France
1932 - Oscar Egg
1st, Sion-Lausanne-Sion
1st, Tour du Canton de Genève
2nd, National Road Race Championship
4th, Züri-Metzgete
11th, Tour de France
11th, World Road Race Championship
1933
1st, Stage 3, Tour de Savoie
2nd, Tour de Suisse
8th, World Road Race Championship
8th, Züri-Metzgete
13th, Tour de France
1934 - Dei
1st, Circuit of Basel
17th, Tour de France
1935
10th, Tour de Suisse

Winner Stage 7

1936
3rd, National Road Race Championship
