= Alphonse Schepers =

Belgian cyclist

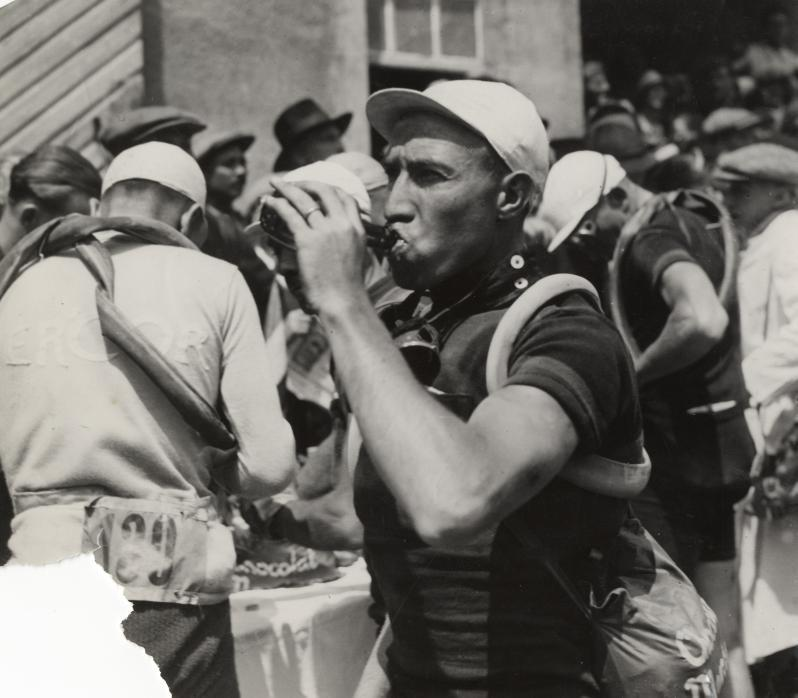
- Schepers at the 1933 Tour de France

Personal information
- Full name: Alphonse Schepers
- Born: 27 August 1907 Neerlinter, Belgium
- Died: 1 December 1984 (aged 77) Tienen, Belgium

Cycling career
- Sport: Cycling
- Discipline: Road
- Role: Rider

Professional teams
- 1931–1934: La Française
- 1935–1936: Dilecta
- 1937–1938: Colin

Major wins
- Liège–Bastogne–Liège (1931–1935) Tour of Flanders (1933); Paris–Nice (1933); Tour de France, 1 stage (1933) Vuelta a España, 3 stages (1936)

Alphonse Schepers (27 August 1907 – 1 December 1984) was a Belgian racing cyclist from the Flemish Brabant deelgemeente (part-municipality) of Neerlinter,. He died in Tienen at the age of 77.

== Major results ==
- Vuelta a España – 3 stages (1936)
- Liège–Bastogne–Liège (1931–1935)
- Paris–Nice
  - 1 stage & Final (1933)
  - 1 stage (1934)
- Paris-Rennes (1934)
- Tour of Flanders (1933)
  - 2nd (1934)
- Tour de France – 1 stage (1933)
- Paris-St. Etienne – 1 stage (1933
- Paris-Belfort (1932)
- Circuit du Morbihan – 1 stage & Final (1932)
- Bordeaux–Paris – 3rd (1932)
- National Road Championship (1931)
- National Cyclo-Cross Championship – 2nd (1931)
- Liège–Bastogne–Liège — version for Independents (1929)
