= Emile Decroix =

Belgian cyclist

Personal information
- Born: 5 March 1904
- Died: 1 April 1967 (aged 63)

Cycling career
- Sport: Cycling
- Discipline: Road
- Role: Rider

Emile Decroix (5 March 1904 – 1 April 1967) was a Belgian racing cyclist. He rode in the 1932 Tour de France.
