= List of teams and cyclists in the 1934 Tour de France =

List of cyclists

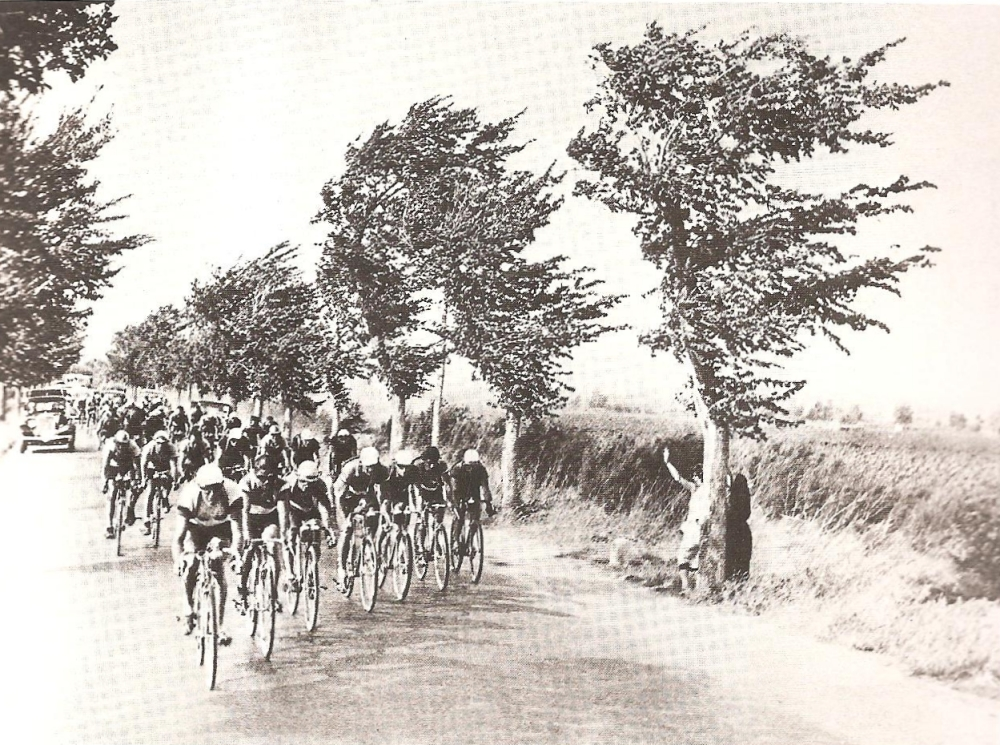
1934 Tour de France

As was the custom since 1930, the 1934 Tour de France was contested by national teams. Belgium, Italy, Germany and France each sent teams of 8 cyclists each, while Switzerland and Spain sent a combined team of eight cyclists. In addition, there were 20 individual cyclists; other than in 1933, they were no longer racing under the nomer "touriste-routier" but as "individuel". In total this made 60 cyclists. Split up in nationalities, there were 20 French, 12 Belgian, 12 Italian, 8 German, 4 Spanish and 4 Swiss cyclists.

The French team of 1934 consisted of all good riders, with the core of the team being the winner of 1933, Georges Speicher, Roger Lapébie, former winner Antonin Magne and Maurice Archambaud, who had performed well in 1933. The French selectors were criticized for selecting René Vietto, a twenty-year-old rider who had only won some small races. The Italian team now included Giuseppe Martano, who had ridden as a touriste-routier in 1933. The Belgian team, which normally included some big contenders, was lackluster.

== By rider ==
Legend
No.	Starting number worn by the rider during the Tour
Pos.	Position in the general classification
DNF	Denotes a rider who did not finish

No.	Name	Nationality	Team	Pos.	Ref
1	Gaston Rebry	Belgium	Belgium	DNF	
2	Alphonse Schepers	Belgium	Belgium	DNF	
3	Louis Hardiquest	Belgium	Belgium	DNF	
4	Romain Maes	Belgium	Belgium	DNF	
5	Frans Bonduel	Belgium	Belgium	18	
6	Edgard De Caluwé	Belgium	Belgium	DNF	
7	Frans Dictus	Belgium	Belgium	DNF	
8	Romain Gijssels	Belgium	Belgium	32	
9	Giuseppe Martano	Italy	Italy	2	
10	Eugenio Gestri	Italy	Italy	14	
11	Antonio Folco	Italy	Italy	39	
12	Giovanni Gotti	Italy	Italy	24	
13	Giovanni Cazzulani	Italy	Italy	16	
14	Vasco Bergamaschi	Italy	Italy	DNF	
15	Adriano Vignoli	Italy	Italy	15	
16	Raffaele di Paco	Italy	Italy	DNF	
17	Albert Büchi	Switzerland	Switzerland/Spain	17	
18	Walter Blattmann	Switzerland	Switzerland/Spain	DNF	
19	Kurt Stettler	Switzerland	Switzerland/Spain	DNF	
20	August Erne	Switzerland	Switzerland/Spain	20	
21	Vicente Trueba	Spain	Switzerland/Spain	10	
22	Luciano Montero	Spain	Switzerland/Spain	30	
23	Mariano Cañardo	Spain	Switzerland/Spain	9	
24	Fédérico Ezquerra	Spain	Switzerland/Spain	19	
25	Kurt Stöpel	Germany	Germany	22	
26	Ludwig Geyer	Germany	Germany	7	
27	Hermann Buse	Germany	Germany	DNF	
28	Willy Kutschbach	Germany	Germany	37	
29	Rudolf Wolke	Germany	Germany	DNF	
30	Kurt Nitschke	Germany	Germany	DNF	
31	Rudolf Risch	Germany	Germany	38	
32	Bruno Wolke	Germany	Germany	DNF	
33	Georges Speicher	France	France	11	
34	Roger Lapébie	France	France	3	
35	Raymond Louviot	France	France	12	
36	Antonin Magne	France	France	1	
37	Charles Pélissier	France	France	DNF	
38	René Vietto	France	France	5	
39	René Le Grevès	France	France	25	
40	Maurice Archambaud	France	France	DNF	
101	Jean Wauters	Belgium	Individual	31	
102	Sylvère Maes	Belgium	Individual	8	
103	Théo Herckenrath	Belgium	Individual	26	
104	Félicien Vervaecke	Belgium	Individual	4	
105	Ambrogio Morelli	Italy	Individual	6	
106	Ettore Meini	Italy	Individual	29	
107	Dante Franzil	Italy	Individual	23	
108	Edoardo Molinar	Italy	Individual	13	
109	Léon Level	France	Individual	21	
110	Jean Bidot	France	Individual	35	
111	Sylvain Marcaillou	France	Individual	34	
112	Gabriel Viratelle	France	Individual	DNF	
113	Marcel Renaud	France	Individual	28	
114	Eugène Le Goff	France	Individual	DNF	
115	Yves Le Goff	France	Individual	33	
116	Gaspard Rinaldi	France	Individual	DNF	
117	Vincent Salazard	France	Individual	27	
118	Fabien Galateau	France	Individual	36	
119	Pierre Pastorelli	France	Individual	DNF	
120	Adrien Buttafocchi	France	Individual	DNF	
