= 1934 Tour de France, Stage 1 to Stage 12 =

Cycling race stages

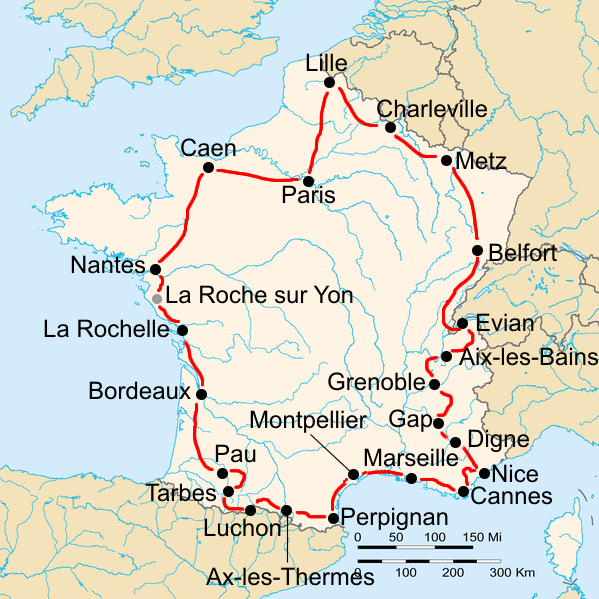
Route of the 1934 Tour de France

The 1934 Tour de France was the 28th edition of Tour de France, one of cycling's Grand Tours. The Tour began in Paris on 3 July and Stage 12 occurred on 16 July with a flat stage to Marseille. The race finished in Paris on 29 July.

== Stage 1 ==
3 July 1934 — Paris to Lille, 262 km (163 mi)

The first stage of the 1934 Tour de France was run on a very hot day, which handicapped the Belgian and North-French cyclists, who were not as used to the heat as the cyclists from Spain, Italy and Southern France. Early in the stage, Georges Speicher tried to escape, but he was caught back by the Italian cyclists. Later, Roger Lapébie and Giovanni Cazzulani escaped, and they created a gap of one minute, but the peloton increased speed and managed to get back to them. After the race passed Beauvais, the cyclists increased their speed further. A group escaped, including Spanish cyclists Mariano Cañardo and Luciano Montero, but that escape was also not successful. Before the hills of Doulens, the peloton regrouped. At that moment, a new escape was started by Félicien Vervaecke, Adriano Vignoli and Vasco Bergamaschi. The French team was weakened at that moment: Francis Pélissier had spent too much energy and was delayed, and Maurice Archambaud suffered from the heat, although he did recuperate and managed to get back to the leading riders. Speicher, who had been without teammates, had been helped by Le Goff, who rode as an individual. After the hills of Doulens, a head group of eight cyclists was formed. Some cyclists got back to the head group, but two kilometres from the end, it was back again to a group of eight cyclists, and the winner was decided by a sprint, won by Georges Speicher.

Stage 1 result and general classification after stage 1

Rank	Rider	Team	Time
1	Georges Speicher (FRA)	France	8h 16' 50"
2	Romain Maes (BEL)	Belgium	s.t.
3	Vasco Bergamaschi (ITA)	Italy	s.t.
4	Maurice Archambaud (FRA)	France	s.t.
5	Sylvère Maes (BEL)	Individual	s.t.
6	Willy Kutschbach (GER)	Germany	s.t.
7	Antonin Magne (FRA)	France	s.t.
8	Félicien Vervaecke (BEL)	Individual	s.t.
9	Romain Gijssels (BEL)	Belgium	+ 43"
10	Roger Lapébie (FRA)	France	s.t.

== Stage 2 ==
4 July 1934 — Lille to Charleville, 192 km (119 mi)

The second stage, run in Northern France in colder weather than the first stage, was through to end up in a victory for a Belgian cyclist. They could not live up to this expectation however, and the Italian team proved stronger. Although Raffaele di Paco had to give up during this stage, the other Italian cyclists were constantly attacking. Speicher, the leader of the general classification, could not keep up, and halfway the stage was already more than three minutes behind. The Italian cyclists kept the speed up, and in the end of the stage, a group of eleven cyclists was more than fifteen minutes ahead of the next group, including Georges Speicher, Roger Lapébie, Charles Pélissier and Maurice Archambaud, four important cyclists of the French team. The French team still had René Le Grevès, Antonin Magne and Raymond Louviot in the first group. Le Grevès won the sprint for the stage victory, and Magne took over the lead in the general classification.

Stage 2 result

Rank	Rider	Team	Time
1	René Le Grevès (FRA)	France	10h 24' 57"
2	Antonin Magne (FRA)	France	s.t.
3	Giuseppe Martano (ITA)	Italy	s.t.
4	Raymond Louviot (FRA)	France	s.t.
5	Hermann Buse (GER)	Germany	s.t.
6	Vasco Bergamaschi (ITA)	Italy	s.t.
7	Yves Le Goff (FRA)	Individual	s.t.
8	Gabriel Viratelle (FRA)	Individual	s.t.
9	Eugenio Gestri (ITA)	Italy	+ 4"
10	Giovanni Gotti (ITA)	Italy	s.t.

General classification after stage 2

Rank	Rider	Team	Time
1	Antonin Magne (FRA)	France	
2	Vasco Bergamaschi (ITA)	Italy	+ 45"
3	René Le Grevès (FRA)	France	+ 2' 35"
4			
5			
6			
7			
8			
9			
10			

== Stage 3 ==
5 July 1934 — Charleville to Metz, 161 km (100 mi)

In the third stage, the cyclists were reserving energy for the fourth stage, in which the first mountain would show up. The riders started without Belgian cyclist Gaston Rebry; he had finished in the second stage outside of the time limit, together with Spaniard Luciano Montero, and although the tour direction allowed them to start again in the third stage, Rebry did not take that chance. The peloton kept together for a long time, and started to race only after they had passed Longuyon. The Belgian Frans Dictus tried to escape, but the French cyclists Louviot and Lapebie reeled him back in. Romain Maes tried to get away a few times, but finally a group of fifteen cyclists was formed, who arrived in Metz first, followed by the other important cyclists in less than one minute. The sprint was won by Lapébie. After the stage, the Belgian Romain Maes, who finished in second place, complained about the other Belgian cyclists, saying that they were more concerned about their own standings than about their teammates, and that they did not race as a team.

Stage 3 result

Rank	Rider	Team	Time
1	Roger Lapébie (FRA)	France	5h 01' 55"
2	Romain Maes (BEL)	Belgium	s.t.
3	Raymond Louviot (FRA)	France	s.t.
4	Giuseppe Martano (ITA)	Italy	s.t.
5	Georges Speicher (FRA)	France	s.t.
6	Ambrogio Morelli (ITA)	Individual	s.t.
=7	Edgard De Caluwé (BEL)	Belgium	s.t.
=7	Frans Dictus (BEL)	Belgium	s.t.
=7	Vasco Bergamaschi (ITA)	Italy	s.t.
=7	Hermann Buse (GER)	Germany	s.t.

General classification after stage 3

Rank	Rider	Team	Time
1	Antonin Magne (FRA)	France	
2	Vasco Bergamaschi (ITA)	Italy	+ 45"
3	René Le Grevès (FRA)	France	+ 3' 22"
4			
5			
6			
7			
8			
9			
10			

== Stage 4 ==
6 July 1934 — Metz to Belfort, 220 km (140 mi)

In the fourth stage, the first mountain counted towards the mountains classification was climbed, the Ballon d'Alsace. Initially after the race started, German Buse escaped, but he was quickly caught back, and nothing happened for a long time, and the pelotón rode as if they were a group of tourists. Around Remiremont, where the landscape became more mountainous, the first real escape took place, with the French cyclist Le Grevès and the Belgian Félicien Vervaecke. Many cyclists suffered on the hills, and an autobus was quickly formed. When the Ballon d'Ascace was to be climbed, Le Grevès and Vervaecke were still leading the race. After Le Grevès could not keep up with Vervaecke anymore, Vervaecke went solo. Vervaecke reached the top first, and collected 10 points for the mountains classification, and also two minutes bonification time for the general classification. The next cyclist was Vicente Trueba, 1'43" behind.

Vervaecke kept his lead, descending the Ballon d'Alsace. Behind him, the cyclists regrouped, and the leader of the general classification, Magne, was in this group. This group worked together to get Vervaecke back. Four kilometres from the finish, Vervaecke had an advantage of 800 metres, but with only 1500 metres to go, Vervaecke fell down and was captured by the pursuing group. In the sprint, Lapébie took the victory, the fourth French victory in four days. Magne, who finished in the lead group, kept leading the general classification, and extended his margin to 6'40". The team classification was still led by the French team, and Vervaecke became the first leader of the mountains classification.

Stage 4 result

Rank	Rider	Team	Time
1	Roger Lapébie (FRA)	France	7h 16' 27"
2	Ambrogio Morelli (ITA)	Individual	s.t.
3	Fédérico Ezquerra (ESP)	Switzerland/Spain	s.t.
4	René Vietto (FRA)	France	s.t.
5	Edoardo Molinar (ITA)	Individual	s.t.
6	Félicien Vervaecke (BEL)	Individual	s.t.
7	Vicente Trueba (ESP)	Switzerland/Spain	s.t.
8	Antonin Magne (FRA)	France	s.t.
9	Giuseppe Martano (ITA)	Italy	+ 1' 29"
10	Maurice Archambaud (FRA)	France	s.t.

General classification after stage 4

Rank	Rider	Team	Time
1	Antonin Magne (FRA)	France	
2	René Le Grevès (FRA)	France	+ 6' 40"
3	Giuseppe Martano (ITA)	Italy	+ 7' 57"
4			
5			
6			
7			
8			
9			
10			

== Stage 5 ==
7 July 1934 — Belfort to Evian, 293 km (182 mi)

Directly after the start of the fifth stage, German Buse tried to escape, just as he had tried the day before. He was joined by Cazzulani, and they created a gap of 300 metres, but were quickly reeled in the peloton. The peloton rode fast, as they ascended the first hill of the day, the Saint-Hyppolyte (not counting towards the mountains classification). Some cyclists could not keep up with on the way up, but many of them were able to regroup on the descent. It was extremely hot, so the main group slowed down, and everybody was able to regroup. Nobody escaped on the Savin, a hill of 900 metres, and on the Faucille, 1350 metres high but with smooth slopes, also nobody escaped. Some cyclists fell out at the back, and when the race reached Geneva, the group consisted of about 20 cyclists. Swiss riders Erne, Büchi and Stettler were allowed to enter Geneva first, and they were cheered by the Swiss spectators. The group reached Evian together, and in the sprint, French cyclists Le Grevès and Speicher crossed the line together. The tour direction could not decide who was the winner, so they were both declared winner of the stage.

The day after the fifth stage was a rest day.

Stage 5 result

Rank	Rider	Team	Time
=1	René Le Grevès (FRA)	France	9h 47' 16"
=1	Georges Speicher (FRA)	France	s.t.
3	Giovanni Cazzulani (ITA)	Italy	s.t.
4	Antonin Magne (FRA)	France	s.t.
5	Ambrogio Morelli (ITA)	Individual	s.t.
=6	Edgard De Caluwé (BEL)	Belgium	s.t.
=6	Giuseppe Martano (ITA)	Italy	s.t.
=6	Eugenio Gestri (ITA)	Italy	s.t.
=6	Albert Büchi (SUI)	Switzerland/Spain	s.t.
=6	Kurt Stettler (SUI)	Switzerland/Spain	s.t.

General classification after stage 5

Rank	Rider	Team	Time
1	Antonin Magne (FRA)	France	
2	René Le Grevès (FRA)	France	+ 5' 33"
3	Giuseppe Martano (ITA)	Italy	+ 7' 57"
4			
5			
6			
7			
8			
9			
10			

== Stage 6 ==
9 July 1934 — Evian to Aix-les-Bains, 207 km (129 mi)

Early in the sixth stage, the Aravis was climbed, the second mountain that counted towards the mountains classification. Vervaecke improved his lead in that classification by reaching the top first. The stage was won by Georges Speicher, who won the sprint of a lead group that included all the favourites.

Stage 6 result

Rank	Rider	Team	Time
1	Georges Speicher (FRA)	France	6h 45' 16"
2	Roger Lapébie (FRA)	France	s.t.
3	Ambrogio Morelli (ITA)	Individual	s.t.
4	Edgard De Caluwé (BEL)	Belgium	s.t.
5	Giovanni Cazzulani (ITA)	Italy	s.t.
6	René Vietto (FRA)	France	s.t.
7	Sylvère Maes (BEL)	Individual	s.t.
8	Mariano Cañardo (ESP)	Switzerland/Spain	s.t.
=9	Giuseppe Martano (ITA)	Italy	s.t.
=9	Giovanni Gotti (ITA)	Italy	s.t.

General classification after stage 6

Rank	Rider	Team	Time
1	Antonin Magne (FRA)	France	
2	Giuseppe Martano (ITA)	Italy	+ 7' 57"
3	Raymond Louviot (FRA)	France	+ 12' 55"
4			
5			
6			
7			
8			
9			
10			

== Stage 7 ==
10 July 1934 — Aix-les-Bains to Grenoble, 229 km (142 mi)

In the seventh stage, the cyclists remained together in the first half. When the cyclists were given their food, a group of four cyclists (Louviot, Morelli, Salazard and Speicher) quickly got theirs, and escaped from the peloton. On the foot of the Telegraph, they were one minute ahead of the next followers, Ezquerra and Vignoli. When Louviot and Salazard got off their bicycles to change gears, Morelli and Speicher continued. Shortly after, Speicher also stopped to change gears, and Morelli went through alone, but he quickly found out that this was a mistake. The four cyclists were then all overtaken by Ezquerra and Vietto, who are duelling to reach the top first. Ezquerra then escaped from Vietto, and reached the top 1 minute and 12 seconds before Vietto. As the cyclists descended the mountain, Vietto was able to get back to Ezquerra. Together they reached the Galibier, and climbed together. Vietto and Ezquerra were being followed by a group led by Trueba. Magne, who was 6 minutes ahead of Ezquerra in the general classification, was also in that group, trailing by 3 minutes. Close to the top of the Galibier, Vietto was dropped by Ezquerra, who reached the top first. For this, Ezquerra received a prize of 5000 francs. Because Vervaecke reached the top in eighth place, Ezquerra took over the leading position in the mountains classification. On the way down from the Galibier, Vietto again caught Ezquerra, and together they rode towards the Col de Lautarast. This time, Vietto won the climbing duel, and he had a margin of 40 seconds to Ezquerra. At that moment, Antonin Magne was more than six minutes behind. With more than 70 km to go, Vietto tried to escape definitively. He gradually built up his lead, and 40 km before the finish, he was leading by about 6 minutes on a group that formed in the plain region, and had reached Ezquerra. But then, Vietto got tired, and his lead went down to 3 minutes when he entered Grenoble. He subsequently won the stage, and Magne, who finished in the next group, maintained the lead in the general classification. The Germans Wolke and Risch, who had finished outside the time limit, were allowed to start the next stage.

Stage 7 result

Rank	Rider	Team	Time
1	René Vietto (FRA)	France	8h 40' 27"
2	Giuseppe Martano (ITA)	Italy	+ 3' 23"
3	Antonin Magne (FRA)	France	s.t.
4	Fédérico Ezquerra (ESP)	Switzerland/Spain	s.t.
5	Edoardo Molinar (ITA)	Individual	s.t.
6	Vicente Trueba (ESP)	Switzerland/Spain	+ 3' 29"
7	Sylvère Maes (BEL)	Individual	+ 11' 45"
8	Félicien Vervaecke (BEL)	Individual	s.t.
9	Ambrogio Morelli (ITA)	Individual	s.t.
10	Adriano Vignoli (ITA)	Italy	s.t.

General classification after stage 7

Rank	Rider	Team	Time
1	Antonin Magne (FRA)	France	
2	Giuseppe Martano (ITA)	Italy	+ 7' 12"
3	Roger Lapébie (FRA)	France	+ 22' 39"
4			
5			
6			
7			
8			
9			
10			

== Stage 8 ==
11 July 1934 — Grenoble to Gap, 102 km (63 mi)

The eighth stage, from Grenoble to Gap, was relatively short, with 102 km. It contained one mountain that counted towards the mountains classification, the Col de Laffrey. This mountain showed up early in the stage. After 17 km of flat land, which were done at low speed, the climb started. Trueba led the climb, followed by Vervaecke, Ezquerra and Morelli. Halfway the climb, Vervaecke had to slow down, but Trueba kept his high speed. He reached the top first, with 1'40" advantage over Ezquerra. Morelli was a few seconds behind Ezquerra, and a group with Magne followed at 2'40". On the way down, the positions changed. Trueba was a bad descender, and could not keep the leading position. Ezquerra, Magne and Martano took the lead, followed by Lapébie, Vervaecke, Geyer, Vietto, Trueba and Morelli. The cyclist then started the climb to the Col Bayard. Then, a new leading group was formed by Molinar, Magne, Martano, Vietto and Vervaecke. Molinar escaped on the way down from the Col Bayard, and sped away with high speed. Magne and Martano tried to follow him, and overtook Molinar. Martano dared to take more risks, and got away from Magne and Molinar. Martano rode solo to the finish, when, at high speed, Martano fell down. He quickly got up, and was able to keep a slight gap, and so won the stage.

Stage 8 result

Rank	Rider	Team	Time
1	Giuseppe Martano (ITA)	Italy	3h 28' 16"
2	Antonin Magne (FRA)	France	+ 7"
3	René Vietto (FRA)	France	+ 28"
4	Félicien Vervaecke (BEL)	Individual	s.t.
5	Ludwig Geyer (GER)	Germany	+ 1' 34"
6	Edoardo Molinar (ITA)	Individual	+ 1' 52"
7	Georges Speicher (FRA)	France	+ 1' 59"
8	Roger Lapébie (FRA)	France	s.t.
9	Ambrogio Morelli (ITA)	Individual	s.t.
10	Sylvère Maes (BEL)	Individual	+ 4' 15"

General classification after stage 8

Rank	Rider	Team	Time
1	Antonin Magne (FRA)	France	
2	Giuseppe Martano (ITA)	Italy	+ 6' 13"
3	Roger Lapébie (FRA)	France	+ 25' 16"
4			
5			
6			
7			
8			
9			
10			

== Stage 9 ==
12 July 1934 — Gap to Digne, 227 km (141 mi)

The first kilometres of the ninth stage were done slowly, as the cyclists were saving their energy for the mountains of the stage. After 19 km, the Col de Var showed up, and the main contenders for the general classification showed up at the head of the peloton, increasing the speed. Magne, the leader, kept close eyes on Martano, his closest competitor. After 4 km of climbing, Vietto escaped. He was closely followed by Vervaecke and Ezquerra. Vietto reached the top first, followed by Ezquerra, and Treuba, who had overtaken Vervaecke on the climb. Magne had stayed together with Martano. On the way down, Vietto kept a high speed, because he was determined to start the next climb alone. He managed to do that, and reached the Barcelonette more than six minutes before the next group, consisting of Ezquerra, Trueba, Vervaecke, Martano, Magne, Morelli, Canardo and Gestri. Vietto had set such a high pace that most of the cyclists were already 20 minutes behind at that point. At the summit of the next mountain, the Col de Allos, Vietto was still six minutes ahead. From then on, it was mainly downhill, and although Vietto lost time, he reached the finish first, with a margin of 2'44" on Molinar and Trueba. Magne finished 6'28" behind Vietto, but he had stayed close to Martano during the entire stage, and so kept his lead in the general classification.

Stage 9 result

Rank	Rider	Team	Time
1	René Vietto (FRA)	France	8h 08' 44"
2	Edoardo Molinar (ITA)	Individual	+ 2' 23"
3	Vicente Trueba (ESP)	Switzerland/Spain	s.t.
4	Georges Speicher (FRA)	France	+ 6' 28"
5	Ambrogio Morelli (ITA)	Individual	s.t.
6	Giuseppe Martano (ITA)	Italy	s.t.
7	Giovanni Cazzulani (ITA)	Italy	s.t.
8	Mariano Cañardo (ESP)	Switzerland/Spain	s.t.
9	Félicien Vervaecke (BEL)	Individual	s.t.
10	Antonin Magne (FRA)	France	s.t.

General classification after stage 9

Rank	Rider	Team	Time
1	Antonin Magne (FRA)	France	
2	Giuseppe Martano (ITA)	Italy	+ 6' 13"
3	Ambrogio Morelli (ITA)	Individual	+ 30' 25"
4			
5			
6			
7			
8			
9			
10			

== Stage 10 ==
13 July 1934 — Digne to Nice, 156 km (97 mi)

In the first kilometres of the tenth stage, Speicher escaped. He created a gap of 300 metres. Belgian Romain Maes fell against a telegraph post. Morelli and Wauters, also fell down, but they quickly got back to the group, while Maes lay in the ground. The car of tour director Jacques Goddet that passed Maes, immediately stopped to help Maes, who had a gaping wound in his forehead. Maes had to stop the race. Speicher was caught back on the Leques. Shortly after, he tried to escape again, together with Lapébie. They were chased and captured by a group consisting of Magne, Martano, Vietto, Trueba, Calezzini and Vervaecke. On the way down, more cyclists join this group. On the next col, the Luen, Vervaecke escaped, trying to win time on Morelli, for the position of best independent rider. He managed to get 2 minutes away, but on the descent of the Seranon he was captured back. At that point, 40 cyclists were together. The speed was kept high by the sprinters, and nobody got away. Because of the high speed, the group broke, and the first group of 20 cyclists sprinted for the victory. René Le Grevès won the stage, ahead of Roger Lapébie.

The day after the tenth stage, the peloton had a rest day.

Stage 10 result

Rank	Rider	Team	Time
1	René Le Grevès (FRA)	France	4h 58' 26"
2	Roger Lapébie (FRA)	France	s.t.
3	Raymond Louviot (FRA)	France	s.t.
4	Félicien Vervaecke (BEL)	Individual	s.t.
5	René Vietto (FRA)	France	s.t.
6	Albert Büchi (SUI)	Switzerland/Spain	s.t.
7	Giuseppe Martano (ITA)	Italy	s.t.
8	Eugenio Gestri (ITA)	Italy	s.t.
9	Giovanni Gotti (ITA)	Italy	s.t.
10	Giovanni Cazzulani (ITA)	Italy	s.t.

General classification after stage 10

Rank	Rider	Team	Time
1	Antonin Magne (FRA)	France	
2	Giuseppe Martano (ITA)	Italy	+ 6' 13"
3	Ambrogio Morelli (ITA)	Individual	+ 30' 25"
4			
5			
6			
7			
8			
9			
10			

== Stage 11 ==
14 July 1934 — Nice to Cannes, 126 km (78 mi)

The eleventh stage contained two mountains that counted towards the mountains classification, the Braus and La Turbie. Directly after the start of the stage, it started to rain. Early in the race, in the climb of the Braus, Vietto escaped. He reached the top 30 seconds before Ezquerra. Vietto stayed alone for a long time, but he was caught by Martano, second placed in the general classification, got away from Magne, the leader of the general classification. Martano and Vietto stayed away, and at the finish line had a margin of 3'23" over Magne. Vietto won the sprint for the stage victory, and Martano reduced the gap in the general classification to 2'05.

Stage 11 result

Rank	Rider	Team	Time
1	René Vietto (FRA)	France	4h 09' 07"
2	Giuseppe Martano (ITA)	Italy	s.t.
3	Antonin Magne (FRA)	France	+ 3' 23"
4	Vicente Trueba (ESP)	Switzerland/Spain	s.t.
5	Roger Lapébie (FRA)	France	+ 6' 19"
6	Félicien Vervaecke (BEL)	Individual	s.t.
7	Ettore Meini (ITA)	Individual	+ 9' 40"
8	Raymond Louviot (FRA)	France	s.t.
9	Ambrogio Morelli (ITA)	Individual	s.t.
10	Pierre Pastorelli (FRA)	Individual	s.t.

General classification after stage 11

Rank	Rider	Team	Time
1	Antonin Magne (FRA)	France	
2	Giuseppe Martano (ITA)	Italy	+ 2' 05"
3	René Vietto (FRA)	France	+ 29' 51"
4			
5			
6			
7			
8			
9			
10			

== Stage 12 ==
15 July 1934 — Cannes to Marseille, 195 km (121 mi)

The twelfth stage was won by Roger Lapébie, but Magne remained leader of the general classification.

Stage 12 result

Rank	Rider	Team	Time
1	Roger Lapébie (FRA)	France	6h 49' 29"
2	Kurt Stöpel (GER)	Germany	s.t.
3	Ambrogio Morelli (ITA)	Individual	s.t.
4	Frans Bonduel (BEL)	Belgium	s.t.
5	Raymond Louviot (FRA)	France	s.t.
6	Edgard De Caluwé (BEL)	Belgium	s.t.
7	August Erne (SUI)	Switzerland/Spain	s.t.
8	Vicente Trueba (ESP)	Switzerland/Spain	s.t.
9	Mariano Cañardo (ESP)	Switzerland/Spain	s.t.
10	Ludwig Geyer (GER)	Germany	s.t.

General classification after stage 12

Rank	Rider	Team	Time
1	Antonin Magne (FRA)	France	
2	Giuseppe Martano (ITA)	Italy	+ 2' 57"
3	René Vietto (FRA)	France	+ 29' 51"
4			
5			
6			
7			
8			
9			
10			
