= 1934 Tour de France, Stage 13 to Stage 23 =

Cycling race stages

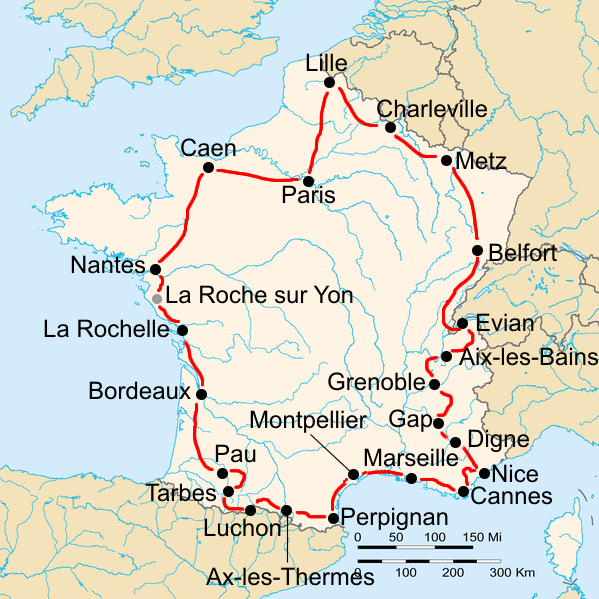
Route of the 1934 Tour de France

The 1934 Tour de France was the 28th edition of Tour de France, one of cycling's Grand Tours. The Tour began in Paris with a flat stage on 3 July, and Stage 13 occurred on 17 July with a flat stage from Marseille. The race finished in Paris on 29 July.

== Stage 13 ==
17 July 1934 — Marseille to Montpellier, 172 km (107 mi)

Stage 13 result

Rank	Rider	Team	Time
1	Georges Speicher (FRA)	France	5h 04' 54"
2	Antonin Magne (FRA)	France	s.t.
3	Raymond Louviot (FRA)	France	s.t.
4	Frans Bonduel (BEL)	Belgium	s.t.
5	Marcel Renaud (FRA)	Individual	s.t.
6	Vincent Salazard (FRA)	Individual	s.t.
7	Giuseppe Martano (ITA)	Italy	s.t.
8	Edgard de Caluwé (BEL)	Belgium	s.t.
=9	Eugenio Gestri (ITA)	Italy	s.t.
=9	Ludwig Geyer (GER)	Germany	s.t.

General classification after stage 13

Rank	Rider	Team	Time
1	Antonin Magne (FRA)	France	
2	Giuseppe Martano (ITA)	Italy	+ 3' 42"
3	René Vietto (FRA)	France	+ 35' 31"
4			
5			
6			
7			
8			
9			
10			

== Stage 14 ==
18 July 1934 — Montpellier to Perpignan, 177 km (110 mi)

Stage 14 result

Rank	Rider	Team	Time
1	Roger Lapébie (FRA)	France	6h 33' 13"
2	René Le Grevès (FRA)	France	s.t.
3	Ettore Meini (ITA)	Individual	s.t.
4	Georges Speicher (FRA)	France	s.t.
5	Raymond Louviot (FRA)	France	s.t.
6	Marcel Renaud (FRA)	Individual	s.t.
7	Edgard de Caluwé (BEL)	Belgium	s.t.
8	Giuseppe Martano (ITA)	Italy	s.t.
9	Romain Gijssels (BEL)	Belgium	s.t.
10	Antonio Folco (ITA)	Italy	s.t.

General classification after stage 14

Rank	Rider	Team	Time
1	Antonin Magne (FRA)	France	
2	Giuseppe Martano (ITA)	Italy	+ 3' 42"
3	René Vietto (FRA)	France	+ 35' 31"
4			
5			
6			
7			
8			
9			
10			

== Stage 15 ==
20 July 1934 — Perpignan to Ax-les-Thermes, 158 km (98 mi)

Stage 15 result

Rank	Rider	Team	Time
1	Roger Lapébie (FRA)	France	5h 47' 03"
2	Eugenio Gestri (ITA)	Italy	s.t.
3	Giovanni Cazzulani (ITA)	Italy	s.t.
4	Giuseppe Martano (ITA)	Italy	s.t.
5	Marcel Renaud (FRA)	Individual	s.t.
=6	Adriano Vignoli (ITA)	Italy	s.t.
=6	Albert Büchi (SUI)	Switzerland/Spain	s.t.
=6	Luciano Montero (ESP)	Switzerland/Spain	s.t.
=6	Mariano Cañardo (ESP)	Switzerland/Spain	s.t.
=6	Kurt Stöpel (GER)	Germany	s.t.

General classification after stage 15

Rank	Rider	Team	Time
1	Antonin Magne (FRA)	France	
2	Giuseppe Martano (ITA)	Italy	+ 2' 57"
3	Félicien Vervaecke (BEL)	Individual	+ 35' 17"
4			
5			
6			
7			
8			
9			
10			

== Stage 16 ==
21 July 1934 — Ax-les-Thermes to Luchon, 165 km (103 mi)

Stage 16 result

Rank	Rider	Team	Time
1	Adriano Vignoli (ITA)	Italy	5h 26' 14"
2	Roger Lapébie (FRA)	France	+ 4' 02"
3	Antonin Magne (FRA)	France	s.t.
4	Romain Gijssels (BEL)	Belgium	s.t.
5	Ambrogio Morelli (ITA)	Individual	s.t.
6	Sylvère Maes (BEL)	Individual	s.t.
=7	Giovanni Cazzulani (ITA)	Italy	s.t.
=7	Giuseppe Martano (ITA)	Italy	s.t.
=7	Ludwig Geyer (GER)	Germany	s.t.
=7	Félicien Vervaecke (BEL)	Individual	s.t.

General classification after stage 16

Rank	Rider	Team	Time
1	Antonin Magne (FRA)	France	
2	Giuseppe Martano (ITA)	Italy	+ 2' 57"
3	Félicien Vervaecke (BEL)	Individual	+ 35' 17"
4			
5			
6			
7			
8			
9			
10			

== Stage 17 ==
22 July 1934 — Luchon to Tarbes, 91 km (57 mi)

Stage 17 result

Rank	Rider	Team	Time
1	Antonin Magne (FRA)	France	2h 51' 46"
2	Vicente Trueba (ESP)	Switzerland/Spain	+ 6' 31"
3	Sylvère Maes (BEL)	Individual	+ 7' 04"
4	René Vietto (FRA)	France	+ 7' 46"
5	Mariano Cañardo (ESP)	Switzerland/Spain	s.t.
6	Félicien Vervaecke (BEL)	Individual	+ 9' 50"
7	Ambrogio Morelli (ITA)	Individual	s.t.
8	Edoardo Molinar (ITA)	Individual	s.t.
9	Raymond Louviot (FRA)	France	+ 11' 53"
10	Edgard de Caluwé (BEL)	Belgium	s.t.

General classification after stage 17

Rank	Rider	Team	Time
1	Antonin Magne (FRA)	France	
2	Giuseppe Martano (ITA)	Italy	+ 19' 47"
3	Félicien Vervaecke (BEL)	Individual	+ 48' 58"
4			
5			
6			
7			
8			
9			
10			

== Stage 18 ==
23 July 1934 — Tarbes to Pau, 172 km (107 mi)

Stage 18 result

Rank	Rider	Team	Time
1	René Vietto (FRA)	France	6h 32' 01"
2	Roger Lapébie (FRA)	France	+ 2' 57"
3	Giuseppe Martano (ITA)	Italy	s.t.
4	Eugenio Gestri (ITA)	Italy	s.t.
5	Sylvère Maes (BEL)	Individual	+ 5' 50"
6	Kurt Stöpel (GER)	Germany	+ 5' 57"
7	Mariano Cañardo (ESP)	Switzerland/Spain	+ 5' 58"
8	Félicien Vervaecke (BEL)	Individual	+ 6' 00"
9	Théo Herckenrath (BEL)	Individual	s.t.
10	Ludwig Geyer (GER)	Germany	s.t.

General classification after stage 18

Rank	Rider	Team	Time
1	Antonin Magne (FRA)	France	
2	Giuseppe Martano (ITA)	Italy	+ 15' 34"
3	René Vietto (FRA)	France	+ 43' 05"
4			
5			
6			
7			
8			
9			
10			

== Stage 19 ==
25 July 1934 — Pau to Bordeaux, 215 km (134 mi)

Stage 19 result

Rank	Rider	Team	Time
1	Ettore Meini (ITA)	Individual	7h 07' 58"
2	Romain Gijssels (BEL)	Belgium	s.t.
3	Raymond Louviot (FRA)	France	s.t.
4	Giuseppe Martano (ITA)	Italy	s.t.
5	Georges Speicher (FRA)	France	s.t.
6	Frans Bonduel (BEL)	Belgium	s.t.
7	Giovanni Gotti (ITA)	Italy	s.t.
8	Jean Wauters (BEL)	Individual	s.t.
9	René Le Grevès (FRA)	France	s.t.
10	Ambrogio Morelli (ITA)	Individual	s.t.

General classification after stage 19

Rank	Rider	Team	Time
1	Antonin Magne (FRA)	France	
2	Giuseppe Martano (ITA)	Italy	+ 15' 34"
3	René Vietto (FRA)	France	+ 43' 05"
4			
5			
6			
7			
8			
9			
10			

== Stage 20 ==
26 July 1934 — Bordeaux to La Rochelle, 183 km (114 mi)

Stage 20 result

Rank	Rider	Team	Time
1	Georges Speicher (FRA)	France	6h 48' 26"
2	René Le Grevès (FRA)	France	s.t.
3	Romain Gijssels (BEL)	Belgium	s.t.
4	Marcel Renaud (FRA)	Individual	s.t.
5	Kurt Stöpel (GER)	Germany	s.t.
6	Edoardo Molinar (ITA)	Individual	s.t.
7	Frans Bonduel (BEL)	Belgium	s.t.
8	Giuseppe Martano (ITA)	Italy	s.t.
9	Eugenio Gestri (ITA)	Italy	s.t.
10	Antonio Folco (ITA)	Italy	s.t.

General classification after stage 20

Rank	Rider	Team	Time
1	Antonin Magne (FRA)	France	
2	Giuseppe Martano (ITA)	Italy	+ 15' 34"
3	René Vietto (FRA)	France	+ 43' 05"
4			
5			
6			
7			
8			
9			
10			

== Stage 21a ==
27 July 1934 — La Rochelle to La Roche-sur-Yon, 81 km (50 mi)

Stage 21a result

Rank	Rider	Team	Time
1	René Le Grevès (FRA)	France	3h 00' 06"
2	Frans Bonduel (BEL)	Belgium	s.t.
3	Ettore Meini (ITA)	Individual	s.t.
4	Georges Speicher (FRA)	France	s.t.
5	Romain Gijssels (BEL)	Belgium	s.t.
6	Raymond Louviot (FRA)	France	s.t.
=7	Ambrogio Morelli (ITA)	Individual	s.t.
=7	Giuseppe Martano (ITA)	Italy	s.t.
=7	Giovanni Gotti (ITA)	Italy	s.t.
=7	Eugenio Gestri (ITA)	Italy	s.t.

General classification after stage 21a

Rank	Rider	Team	Time
1	Antonin Magne (FRA)	France	
2	Giuseppe Martano (ITA)	Italy	+ 15' 34"
3	René Vietto (FRA)	France	+ 43' 05"
4			
5			
6			
7			
8			
9			
10			

== Stage 21b ==
27 July 1934 — La Roche-sur-Yon to Nantes, 90 km (56 mi) (ITT)

Stage 21b result

Rank	Rider	Team	Time
1	Antonin Magne (FRA)	France	2h 32' 05"
2	Roger Lapébie (FRA)	France	+ 1' 06"
3	Ludwig Geyer (GER)	Germany	+ 5' 56"
4	Sylvère Maes (BEL)	Individual	+ 7' 48"
5	Giuseppe Martano (ITA)	Italy	+ 8' 01"
6	Félicien Vervaecke (BEL)	Individual	+ 8' 40"
7	René Vietto (FRA)	France	+ 9' 42"
8	Raymond Louviot (FRA)	France	+ 9' 58"
9	Albert Büchi (SUI)	Switzerland/Spain	+ 11' 40"
10	Georges Speicher (FRA)	France	+ 11' 41"

General classification after stage 21b

Rank	Rider	Team	Time
1	Antonin Magne (FRA)	France	
2	Giuseppe Martano (ITA)	Italy	+ 26' 11"
3	Roger Lapébie (FRA)	France	+ 52' 21"
4			
5			
6			
7			
8			
9			
10			

== Stage 22 ==
28 July 1934 — Nantes to Caen, 275 km (171 mi)

Stage 22 result

Rank	Rider	Team	Time
1	Raymond Louviot (FRA)	France	8h 47' 55"
2	René Le Grevès (FRA)	France	+ 33"
3	Frans Bonduel (BEL)	Belgium	s.t.
4	Ambrogio Morelli (ITA)	Individual	s.t.
5	Georges Speicher (FRA)	France	s.t.
6	Vincent Salazard (FRA)	Individual	s.t.
7	Albert Büchi (SUI)	Switzerland/Spain	s.t.
8	Ludwig Geyer (GER)	Germany	s.t.
9	Sylvère Maes (BEL)	Individual	s.t.
10	Félicien Vervaecke (BEL)	Individual	s.t.

General classification after stage 22

Rank	Rider	Team	Time
1	Antonin Magne (FRA)	France	
2	Giuseppe Martano (ITA)	Italy	+ 26' 11"
3	Roger Lapébie (FRA)	France	+ 53' 34"
4			
5			
6			
7			
8			
9			
10			

== Stage 23 ==
29 July 1934 — Caen to Paris, 221 km (137 mi)

Stage 23 result

Rank	Rider	Team	Time
1	Sylvère Maes (BEL)	Individual	7h 11' 41"
2	Roger Lapébie (FRA)	France	+ 20"
3	Kurt Stöpel (GER)	Germany	s.t.
4	Félicien Vervaecke (BEL)	Individual	s.t.
5	Georges Speicher (FRA)	France	s.t.
6	Ludwig Geyer (GER)	Germany	s.t.
7	Antonin Magne (FRA)	France	+ 1' 44"
8	René Le Grevès (FRA)	France	+ 2' 47"
9	Marcel Renaud (FRA)	Individual	s.t.
10	Vincent Salazard (FRA)	Individual	s.t.

General classification after stage 23

Rank	Rider	Team	Time
1	Antonin Magne (FRA)	France	147h 13' 58"
2	Giuseppe Martano (ITA)	Italy	+ 27' 31"
3	Roger Lapébie (FRA)	France	+ 52' 15"
4	Félicien Vervaecke (BEL)	Individual	+ 57' 40"
5	René Vietto (FRA)	France	+ 59' 02"
6	Ambrogio Morelli (ITA)	Individual	+ 1h 12' 02"
7	Ludwig Geyer (GER)	Germany	+ 1h 12' 51"
8	Sylvère Maes (BEL)	Individual	+ 1h 20' 56"
9	Mariano Cañardo (ESP)	Switzerland/Spain	+ 1h 29' 02"
10	Vicente Trueba (ESP)	Switzerland/Spain	+ 1h 40' 39"
