= 1934 Giro d'Italia =

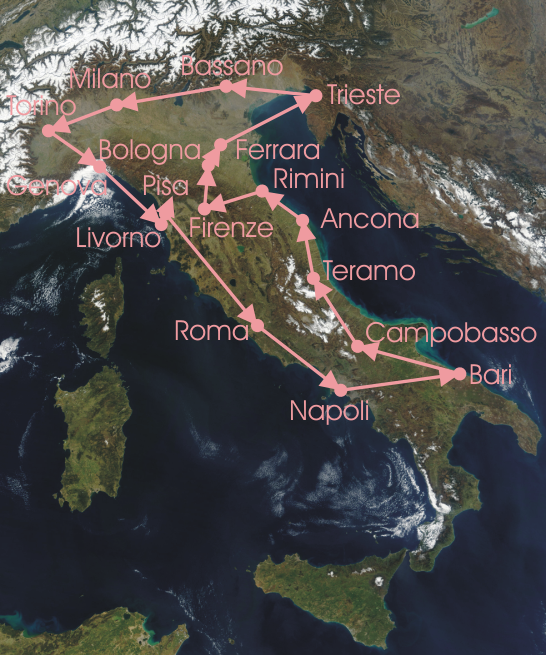
- Race Route

Race details
- Dates: 19 May – 10 June 1934
- Stages: 17
- Distance: 3,712.7 km (2,307 mi)
- Winning time: 121h 17' 17"

Results
Jersey awarded to the overall winner	Winner	Learco Guerra (ITA)	(Maino)
	Second	Francesco Camusso (ITA)	(Gloria)
	Third	Giovanni Cazzulani (ITA)	(Gloria)
	Mountains	Remo Bertoni (ITA)	(Legnano)
	Team	Gloria	

The 1934 Giro d'Italia was the 22nd edition of the Giro d'Italia bicycle race, organized and sponsored by the newspaper La Gazzetta dello Sport. The race began on 19 May in Milan with a stage that stretched 169.2 km (105 mi) to Turin, finishing back in Milan on 10 June after a 315 km (196 mi) stage and a total distance covered of 3,712.7 km (2,307 mi). The race was won by the Learco Guerra of the Maino team. Second and third respectively were the Italian riders Francesco Camusso and Giovanni Cazzulani.

Favourite Alfredo Binda retired during the 6th stage. Guerra took over the lead in the general classification from the climb specialist Francesco Camusso in the decisive time trial stage from Bologna to Ferrara.

== Participants ==
Of the 109 riders that began the Giro d'Italia on 19 May, 52 of them made it to the finish in Milan on 10 June. Riders were allowed to ride on their own or as a member of a team; 52 riders competed as part of a team, while the remaining 66 competed independently. There were eight teams that competed in the race: Bianchi-Pirelli, Dei-Pirelli, Ganna-Dunlop, Gloria-Hutchinson, Legnano-Hutchinson, Maino-d'Alessandro, Olympia-Spiga, and Olmpique.

The peloton was primarily composed of Italians, but contained many French and Belgian riders. The field featured three former Giro d'Italia champions in five-time winner and current champion Alfredo Binda and single race winners, Francesco Camusso and Vasco Bergamaschi. Other notable Italian riders that started the race included Learco Guerra, Giuseppe Olmo, Remo Bertoni, and Domenico Piemontesi. Félicien Vervaecke, a Belgian rider who went on to achieve great success at the Tour de France, entered the race. Belgian Jef Demuysere was seen as a favorite to win the race after his victory in the Milan–San Remo earlier in the season.

== Race summary ==
In the first stages, several riders were caught riding behind motorcycles. The jury was very strict, and disqualified them. Learco Guerra dominated the early stages, winning multiple road stages and excelling in the first time trial, where he averaged over 41 km/h, nearly two km/h faster than Binda’s 1933 performance. By stage six, Guerra led the general classification, but his margin remained narrow. In that stage, the defending champion Binda collided with a police motorcycle, and had to abandon.

Isolated rider Adriano Vignoli made a notable impact in stage seven with a 160-kilometer solo breakaway, gaining over ten minutes and moving into sixth place. In stage eight, Olmo took the race lead after Guerra lost time on the hilly terrain. However, Guerra reclaimed the pink jersey the next day.

A dramatic incident occurred at a feed zone in Pescara, where Francesco Camusso clashed with a police commissioner and was briefly detained before being allowed to continue after intervention by Giro boss Armando Cougnet. Guerra then won three consecutive stages, but Camusso remained within striking distance.

The race’s most controversial moment came in stage 13, when Guerra, suffering from stomach issues, abandoned the race and entered his team car. Organizers Armando Cougnet and Emilio Colombo persuaded him to rejoin the race, and he continued despite having been driven part of the route. No penalty was issued, likely due to Guerra’s popularity and commercial value to the race.

Camusso took the lead after that stage, but Guerra reclaimed it in the second time trial in Bologna, where he gained nearly four minutes on the climber. Although Olmo won the final two stages, Guerra secured overall victory by just 51 seconds over Camusso.

== Route and stages ==
Stage results
Stage	Date	Course	Distance	Type (Note: In 1934, there was no distinction in the rules between plain stages and mountain stages; the icons shown here indicate that the second, third, fifth, seventh, eighth, ninth, tenth, twelfth, thirteenth, sixteenth, and seventeenth stages included major mountains.)	Winner
1	19 May	Milan to Turin	169.2 km (105 mi)	Plain stage	Francesco Camusso (ITA)
2	20 May	Turin to Genoa	206.5 km (128 mi)	Stage with mountain(s)	Learco Guerra (ITA)
	21 May	Rest day			
3	22 May	Genoa to Livorno	220.5 km (137 mi)	Stage with mountain(s)	Learco Guerra (ITA)
4	23 May	Livorno to Pisa	45 km (28 mi)	Individual time trial	Learco Guerra (ITA)
5	24 May	Pisa to Rome	333 km (207 mi)	Stage with mountain(s)	Learco Guerra (ITA)
	25 May	Rest day			
6	26 May	Rome to Naples	228 km (142 mi)	Plain stage	Learco Guerra (ITA)
7	27 May	Naples to Bari	339 km (211 mi)	Stage with mountain(s)	Adriano Vignoli (ITA)
	28 May	Rest day			
8	29 May	Bari to Campobasso	245 km (152 mi)	Stage with mountain(s)	Félicien Vervaecke (BEL)
9	30 May	Campobasso to Teramo	283 km (176 mi)	Stage with mountain(s)	Learco Guerra (ITA)
10	31 May	Teramo to Ancona	214 km (133 mi)	Stage with mountain(s)	Learco Guerra (ITA)
	1 June	Rest day			
11	2 June	Ancona to Rimini	213 km (132 mi)	Plain stage	Learco Guerra (ITA)
12	3 June	Rimini to Florence	176.5 km (110 mi)	Stage with mountain(s)	Learco Guerra (ITA)
13	4 June	Florence to Bologna	120 km (75 mi)	Stage with mountain(s)	Giuseppe Olmo (ITA)
	5 June	Rest day			
14	6 June	Bologna to Ferrara	59 km (37 mi)	Individual time trial	Learco Guerra (ITA)
15	7 June	Ferrara to Trieste	273 km (170 mi)	Plain stage	Fabio Battesini (ITA)
16	8 June	Trieste to Bassano del Grappa	273 km (170 mi)	Stage with mountain(s)	Giuseppe Olmo (ITA)
	9 June	Rest day			
17	10 June	Bassano to Milan	315 km (196 mi)	Stage with mountain(s)	Giuseppe Olmo (ITA)
Total		3,712.7 km (2,307 mi)			

== Classification leadership ==
The leader of the general classification – calculated by adding the stage finish times of each rider – wore a pink jersey. This classification is the most important of the race, and its winner is considered as the winner of the Giro. In 1934, there was a time bonus for the winner of aach stage, but unlike the year before no time bonus for the first rider on a mountain top.

The race organizers allowed isolated riders to compete in the race, which had a separate classification calculated the same way as the general classification, with a white jersey for the leader of this classification.

In the mountains classification, the race organizers selected different mountains that the route crossed and awarded points to the five riders who crossed them first.

The winner of the team classification was determined by adding the finish times of the best three cyclists per team together and the team with the lowest total time was the winner. If a team had fewer than three riders finish, they were not eligible for the classification.

Il Trofeo Magno (English: the Great Trophy) was a classification for independent Italian riders competing in the race. The riders were divided into teams based on the region of Italy they were from. The calculation of the standings was the same for the team classification. At the end of the race, a trophy was awarded to the winning team and it was then stored at the Federal Secretary of the P.N.P. in their respective province.

The rows in the following table correspond to the jerseys awarded after that stage was run.

Stage	Winner	General classification	Best foreign rider	Best isolated rider	Mountains classification	Team classification	Il Trofeo Magno
1	Francesco Camusso	Francesco Camusso	Félicien Vervaecke	Rinaldo Gerini	not awarded	?	?
2	Learco Guerra	Francesco Camusso	Eugene Le Goff	Rinaldo Gerini	not awarded	Bianchi	Piemonte
3	Learco Guerra	Francesco Camusso	Eugene Le Goff	Rinaldo Gerini	not awarded	?	Piemonte
4	Learco Guerra	Learco Guerra	Emile Decroix	Augusto Como	not awarded	Legnano	Piemonte
5	Learco Guerra	Learco Guerra	Emile Decroix	Eugenio Gestri	Remo Bertoni	?	Piemonte
6	Learco Guerra	Learco Guerra	Emile Decroix	Eugenio Gestri	Remo Bertoni	Maino	Piemonte
7	Adriano Vignoli	Learco Guerra	Albert Büchi	Adriano Vignoli	Remo Bertoni	Maino	Emilia
8	Félicien Vervaecke	Giuseppe Olmo	Jef Demuysere	Renato Scorticati	Remo Bertoni	Maino	Emilia
9	Learco Guerra	Learco Guerra	Emile Decroix	Giovanni Gotti	Remo Bertoni	Maino	Emilia
10	Learco Guerra	Learco Guerra	Emile Decroix	Giovanni Gotti	Remo Bertoni	Maino	Emilia
11	Learco Guerra	Learco Guerra	Emile Decroix	Giovanni Gotti	Remo Bertoni	Maino	Emilia
12	Learco Guerra	Learco Guerra	Jef Demuysere	Giovanni Gotti	Remo Bertoni	Maino	Emilia
13	Giuseppe Olmo	Francesco Camusso	Jef Demuysere	Giovanni Gotti	Remo Bertoni	Gloria	Emilia
14	Learco Guerra	Learco Guerra	Jef Demuysere	Giovanni Gotti	Remo Bertoni	Gloria	Emilia
15	Fabio Battesini	Learco Guerra	Jef Demuysere	Giovanni Gotti	Remo Bertoni	Gloria	Emilia
16	Giuseppe Olmo	Learco Guerra	Jef Demuysere	Giovanni Gotti	Remo Bertoni	Gloria	Emilia
17	Giuseppe Olmo	Learco Guerra	Jef Demuysere	Giovanni Gotti	Remo Bertoni	Gloria	Emilia
Final		Learco Guerra	Jef Demuysere	Giovanni Gotti	Remo Bertoni	Gloria	Emilia

== Final standings ==
Legend
A pink jersey	Denotes the winner of the General classification
A white jersey	Denotes the winner of the isolated rider classification

=== General classification ===
Final general classification (1–10)
Rank	Name	Team	Time
1	Learco Guerra (ITA)	Maino	121h 17' 17"
2	Francesco Camusso (ITA)	Gloria	+ 51"
3	Giovanni Cazzulani (ITA)	Gloria	+ 4' 59"
4	Giuseppe Olmo (ITA)	Bianchi	+ 5' 39"
5	Giovanni Gotti (ITA)	—	+ 8' 01"
6	Remo Bertoni (ITA)	Legnano	+ 15' 30"
7	Domenico Piemontesi (ITA)	Maino	+ 15' 30"
8	Adriano Vignoli (ITA)	—	+ 24' 46"
9	Luigi Giacobbe (ITA)	Maino	+ 25' 58"
10	Luigi Barral (ITA)	Bianchi	+ 33' 18"

=== Foreign rider classification ===
Final foreign rider classification (1–8)
Rank	Name	Team	Time
1	Jef Demuysere (BEL)	Ganna	121h 54' 20"
2	Félicien Vervaecke (BEL)	Ganna	+ 1h 17' 31"
3	Alfons Guesquière (BEL)	?	+ 1h 29' 52"
4	Vicente Trueba (ESP)	Olympia	+ 2h 08' 18"
5	Fabien Galateau (FRA)	?	+ 2h 17' 55"
6	Vincent Salazard (FRA)	?	+ 3h 03' 12"
7	Herbert Sieronski (GER)	?	+ 3h 10' 55"
8	Max Bulla (AUT)	?	+ 3h 22' 22"

=== Isolati rider classification ===
Final isolati rider classification (1–10)
Rank	Name	Time
1	Giovanni Gotti (ITA)	121h 28' 06"
2	Adriano Vignoli (ITA)	+ 16' 47"
3	Renato Scorticati (ITA)	+ 28' 58"
4	Augusto Como (ITA)	+ 40' 09"
5	Ambrogio Morelli (ITA)	+ 49' 55"
6	Attilio Masarati (ITA)	+ 59' 55"
7	Isidoro Piubellini (ITA)	+ 1h 06' 36"
8	Battista Astrua (ITA)	+ 1h 07' 09"
9	Carlo Oria (ITA)	+ 1h 14' 11"
10	Ernesto Merlini (ITA)	+ 1h 33' 03"

=== Mountains classification ===
Final mountains classification (1–9)
	Name	Team	Points
1	Remo Bertoni (ITA)	Legnano	31
2	Luigi Barral (ITA)	Bianchi	21
3	Félicien Vervaecke (BEL)	Ganna	19
4	Francesco Camusso (ITA)	Gloria	17
5	Vicente Trueba (ESP)	Olympia	10
6	Luigi Giacobbe (ITA)	Maino	4
6	Stefano Giuppone (ITA)	—	4
6	Orlando Teani (ITA)	Olympia	4
9	Giovanni Gotti (ITA)	—	3
9	Giovanni Cazzulani (ITA)	Gloria	3
9	Adriano Vignoli (ITA)	—	3

=== Team classification ===
Final time classification (1–6)
	Team	Time
1	Gloria	364h 41' 22"
2	Maino	+ 27"
3	Bianchi	+ 41' 13"
4	Legnano	+ 1h 22' 50"
5	Ganna	+ 3h 22' 33"
6	Olympia	+ 5h 59' 28"

=== Il Trofeo Magno ===
Final Il Trofeo Magno classification (1–3)
	Team	Time
1	Emilia	366h 09' 58"
2	Lombardia	+ 10' 51"
3	Piemonte	+ 1h 15' 49"
