= 1934 Giro di Lombardia =

Race details
- Dates: October 21, 1934
- Stages: 1
- Distance: 245 km (152.2 mi)

Results
	Winner	Learco Guerra (ITA)
	Second	Mario Cipriani (ITA)
	Third	Domenico Piemontesi (ITA)

The 1934 Giro di Lombardia was the 30th edition of the race. It was held on October 21, 1934, competing over a total route of 245 km. It was won by the Italian Learco Guerra, reached the finish line with the time of 7h34 ' 00 "at an average of 32.378 km/h, preceding the countrymen Mario Cipriani and Domenico Piemontesi.

160 cyclists took off from Milan and 60 of them completed the race.

== General classification ==
Final general classification

Rank	Rider	Team	Time
1	Learco Guerra (ITA)	Maino-Clement	7h34 ' 00 "
2	Mario Cipriani (ITA)	Frejus	
3	Domenico Piemontesi (ITA)	Maino-Clement	
4	Pietro Rimoldi (ITA)		
5	René Vietto (FRA)		
6	Francesco Camusso (ITA)	Gloria	
7	Remo Scorticati (ITA)		
8	Severino Canavesi (ITA)	Legnano-Wolsit	
9	Giovanni Cazzulani (ITA)	Gloria	
10	Edoardo Molinar (ITA)		
