= 1934 Tour de France =

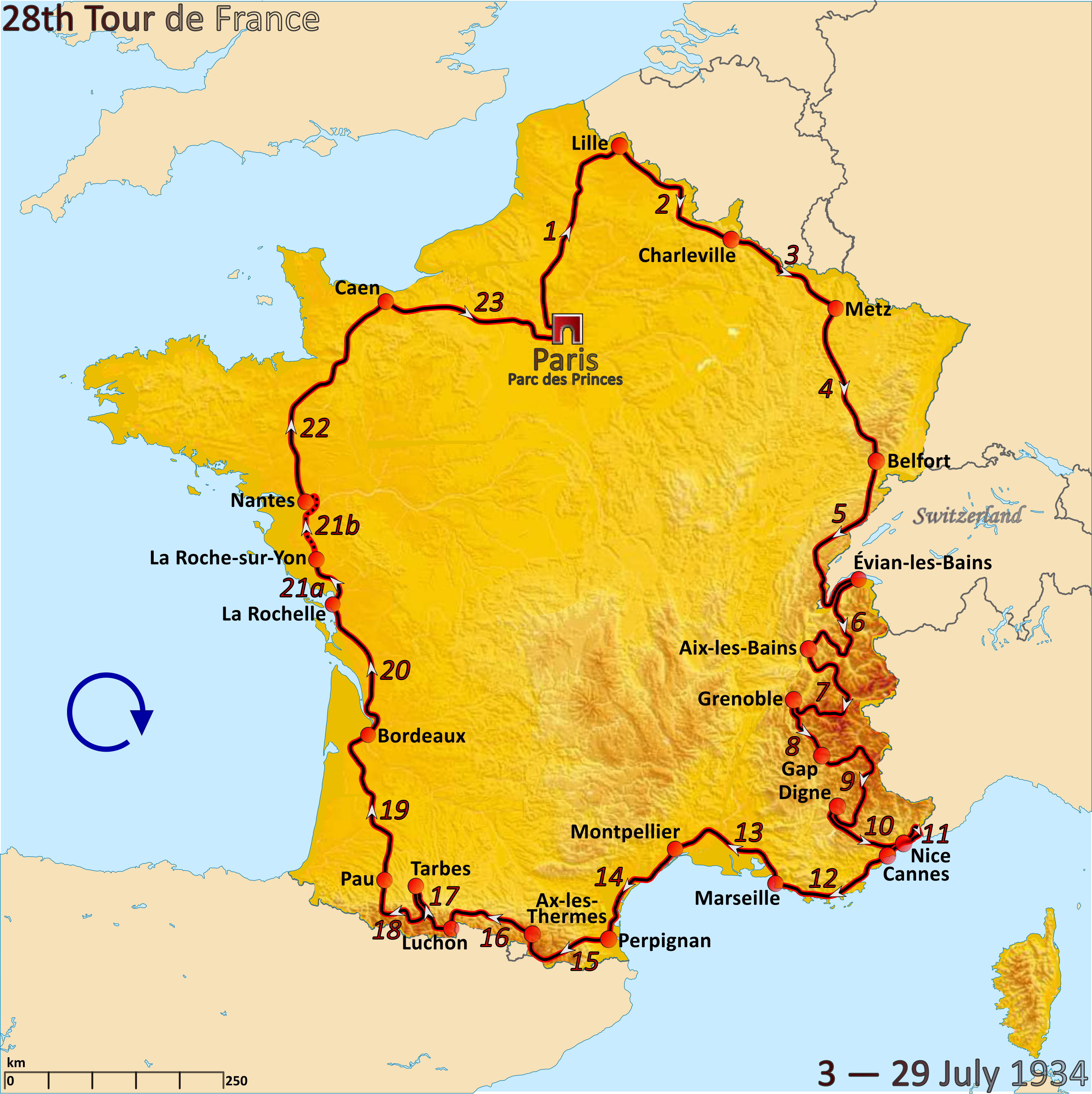
- Route of the 1934 Tour de France followed clockwise, starting in Paris

Race details
- Dates: 3–29 July 1934
- Stages: 23, including one split stage
- Distance: 4,470 km (2,780 mi)
- Winning time: 147h 13' 58"

Results
Jersey awarded to the overall winner	Winner	Antonin Magne (FRA)	(France)
	Second	Giuseppe Martano (ITA)	(Italy)
	Third	Roger Lapébie (FRA)	(France)
	Mountains	René Vietto (FRA)	(France)
	Team	France	

The 1934 Tour de France was the 28th edition of the Tour de France, taking place from 3 to 29 July. It consisted of 23 stages over 4,470 km (2,778 mi). The race was won by Antonin Magne, who had previously won the 1931 Tour de France. The French team was dominant, holding the yellow jersey for the entire race and winning most of the stages. Every member of the French team won at least one stage.

French cyclist René Vietto rose to prominence by winning the mountains classification, but even more by giving up his own chances for the Tour victory by giving first his front wheel and later his bicycle to his team captain Magne.

The 1934 Tour de France saw the introduction of the split stage and the individual time trial. Stage 21 was split into two parts, and the second part was an individual time trial, the first one in the history of the Tour de France.

== Innovations and changes ==
The major introduction in 1934 was the introduction of the individual time trial (ITT). There had been time-trial like stages before in the Tour de France, but they had been run as a team time trial. Since the format of the Tour de France changed in 1930 from trade teams to national teams, the Tour organisation had to pay for the housing, travel and feeding for the cyclists. The organisation received the money from the sales of l'Auto, the newspaper that organised the Tour. l'Auto was a morning newspaper, while one of its competitors, Paris-Soir, was an evening paper. Paris-Soir was also following the race, and was able to publish the results the same day, while l'Auto had to wait for the next day, publishing old news. To counter this, the stages in the Tour de France had started later, so they would end after Paris-Soir had to print their newspapers. The Paris-Soir sports editor had countered this by starting his own race, the Grand Prix des Nations, run as an ITT. The first edition in 1932 was not received well by the cyclists, but from 1933 on it was a success. The tour director Henri Desgrange saw the success of the French cyclists in the Grand Prix des Nations, and adapted the individual time trial format in the Tour. Not all cyclists were happy with the ITT. René Vietto, a climber, said it was a dull test of horsepower, while a bike race should also test the head. Other cyclists said the ITT would negate the effect of good teamwork.

The bonification system from the 1933 Tour de France was slightly reduced: now the winner of a stage received 90 seconds bonification, and the second cyclist 45 seconds. In addition to this, the winner of the stage received a bonification equal to the difference between him and the second-placed cyclists, with a maximum of two minutes. This same bonification system was applied on mountain summits that counted for the mountains classification.

In 1933, there had been 40 touriste-routiers, cyclist not competing in a national team, but in 1934 this was reduced to 20. In previous years, these touriste-routiers had to supply their own material and arrange their own hotels; in 1934, the conditions improved and touriste-routiers were given the same treatment as the riders in national teams.

== Teams ==
As was the custom since the 1930 Tour de France, the 1934 Tour de France was contested by national teams. Belgium, Italy, Germany and France each sent teams of 8 cyclists each, while Switzerland and Spain sent a combined team of eight cyclists. In addition, there were 20 individual cyclists; other than in 1933, they were no longer racing under the nomer "touriste-routier" but as "individuel". In total this made 60 cyclists.

== Pre-race favourites ==
The French team of 1934 consisted of all good riders, with the core of the team being the winner of 1933, Georges Speicher, Roger Lapébie, former winner Antonin Magne and Maurice Archambaud, who had performed well in 1933. The French selectors were criticized for selecting René Vietto, a twenty-year-old rider who had only won some small races. The Italian team now included Giuseppe Martano, who had ridden as a touriste-routier in 1933. The Belgian team, which normally included some big contenders, was lackluster.

== Route and stages ==
The highest point of elevation in the race was 2,556 m (8,386 ft) at the summit tunnel of the Col du Galibier mountain pass on stage 7.

Stage characteristics and winners
Stage	Date	Course	Distance	Type (Note: In 1934, there was no distinction in the rules between plain stages and mountain stages; the icons shown here indicate whether the stage included mountains that counted for the mountains classification.)	Winner
1	3 July	Paris to Lille	262 km (163 mi)	Plain stage	Georges Speicher (FRA)
2	4 July	Lille to Charleville	192 km (119 mi)	Plain stage	René Le Grevès (FRA)
3	5 July	Charleville to Metz	161 km (100 mi)	Plain stage	Roger Lapébie (FRA)
4	6 July	Metz to Belfort	220 km (140 mi)	Stage with mountain(s)	Roger Lapébie (FRA)
5	7 July	Belfort to Evian	293 km (182 mi)	Plain stage	René Le Grevès (FRA); Georges Speicher (FRA) (Note: Le Grevès and Speicher were both declared winner of the fifth stage.)
	8 July	Evian		Rest day	
6	9 July	Evian to Aix-les-Bains	207 km (129 mi)	Stage with mountain(s)	Georges Speicher (FRA)
7	10 July	Aix-les-Bains to Grenoble	229 km (142 mi)	Stage with mountain(s)	René Vietto (FRA)
8	11 July	Grenoble to Gap	102 km (63 mi)	Stage with mountain(s)	Giuseppe Martano (ITA)
9	12 July	Gap to Digne	227 km (141 mi)	Stage with mountain(s)	René Vietto (FRA)
10	13 July	Digne to Nice	156 km (97 mi)	Plain stage	René Le Grevès (FRA)
	14 July	Nice		Rest day	
11	15 July	Nice to Cannes	126 km (78 mi)	Stage with mountain(s)	René Vietto (FRA)
12	16 July	Cannes to Marseille	195 km (121 mi)	Plain stage	Roger Lapébie (FRA)
13	17 July	Marseille to Montpellier	172 km (107 mi)	Plain stage	Georges Speicher (FRA)
14	18 July	Montpellier to Perpignan	177 km (110 mi)	Plain stage	Roger Lapébie (FRA)
	19 July	Perpignan		Rest day	
15	20 July	Perpignan to Ax-les-Thermes	158 km (98 mi)	Plain stage	Roger Lapébie (FRA)
16	21 July	Ax-les-Thermes to Luchon	165 km (103 mi)	Stage with mountain(s)	Adriano Vignoli (ITA)
17	22 July	Luchon to Tarbes	91 km (57 mi)	Stage with mountain(s)	Antonin Magne (FRA)
18	23 July	Tarbes to Pau	172 km (107 mi)	Stage with mountain(s)	René Vietto (FRA)
	24 July	Pau		Rest day	
19	25 July	Pau to Bordeaux	215 km (134 mi)	Plain stage	Ettore Meini (ITA)
20	26 July	Bordeaux to La Rochelle	183 km (114 mi)	Plain stage	Georges Speicher (FRA)
21a	27 July	La Rochelle to La Roche sur Yon	81 km (50 mi)	Plain stage	René Le Grevès (FRA)
21b	27 July	La Roche sur Yon to Nantes	90 km (56 mi)	Individual time trial	Antonin Magne (FRA)
22	28 July	Nantes to Caen	275 km (171 mi)	Plain stage	Raymond Louviot (FRA)
23	29 July	Caen to Paris	221 km (137 mi)	Plain stage	Sylvère Maes (BEL)
	Total		4,470 km (2,778 mi)		

== Race overview ==
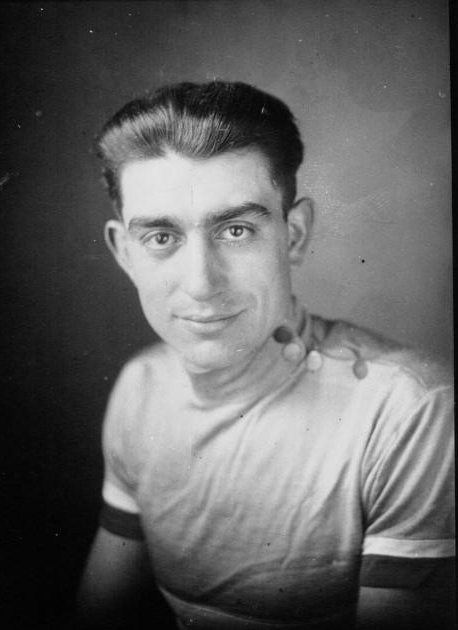
Antonin Magne, winner of the 1934 Tour de France

The first stage was won by 1933 winner Speicher, and again wore the yellow jersey. In the second stage, he lost his lead as there was a split, with Speicher in the second part and Magne in the leading group, and Magne took over the leading position.

In the fifth stage, Le Grevès and Speicher finished close together. After examining the photo finish, both cyclists shared the time bonus, although Le Grevès was named winner.

After stage six, before the heavy climbing in the alps, Magne was leading with almost 8 minutes on second-placed Martano. In the alps, Vietto was the best. He won stages 7 and 9, and climbed to third place in the general classification, half an hour behind Magne. Had he not lost 40 minutes in the first two stages due to flat tires, he would have been the leader of the race. Martano had been able to reduce the margin to Magne to 125 seconds.

The stages 12 to 14, between the Alps and the Pyrenees, were won by French cyclists, without important changes in the general classification. In the fifteenth stage, Magne attacked on an early climb, but Martano did not drop. The big climb of the day was the Puymorens, and Vietto lead while Magne and Martano followed. On the way down, Magne crashed on a pothole, and broke the wooden rim of his front wheel. Martano saw his chances, and raced away. Magne asked Vietto for his bicycle, but Vietto only gave him his front wheel. Magne's frame had been bent in the crash, so when Speicher, the next French cyclist, showed up, Magne took Speicher's bicycle. Vietto had to wait several minutes to get a replacing front wheel, and lost all chances for the stage victory. A photographer was present to take a picture of Vietto, weeping with a bike without a front wheel. When this picture was published, the cycling world was touched, and newspapers proclaimed him "Le Roi René" (King René).

In the sixteenth stage, things got worse for Vietto. He was first over the first two mountains, with his team leader Magne and Martano closely following. On the descent of the Portet d'Aspet, Magne crashed again, and broke his rear wheel. Vietto was unaware of this, and continued. When he was down, a Tour course marshall informed him that his team leader had crashed. Lapébie was far ahead, and all the other French cyclists were far behind, so Magne was without support. Vietto then turned around, and rode back up the mountain. When he reached Magne, Magne took Vietto's bicycle. Magne rode down, reached Lapébie who had waited for him, and together they caught Martano. Vietto had to wait for the service car to bring him a new bicycle, and finally finished four minutes behind Magne, Martano and Lapébie. Vietto was not happy with what had happened, and he said that Magne did not know how to ride, and that Lapébie should not have been so far ahead. Magne on the other hand was grateful for what Vietto and Lapébie did.

In the seventeenth stage, Magne was able to get away from Martano who broke his frame, and finished 13 minutes ahead of thim while winning the stage. Magne now lead with almost 20 minutes. In the eighteenth stage, Magne lost four minutes to Martano. It could have been more, had not Vietto and Lapébie collected the time bonuses on the mountains and the finish.

In the next flat stages, nothing really changed the general classification except the individual time trial in stage 21. Magne won there, increasing the margin to Martano by 8 minutes. Vietto had won back enough time to end in fifth place in the general classification, and won the mountains classification. Magne had ridden consistently in the entire Tour, and had benefitted from his team support. He won his second Tour de France, the fifth in a row for France.

== Classification leadership and minor prizes ==
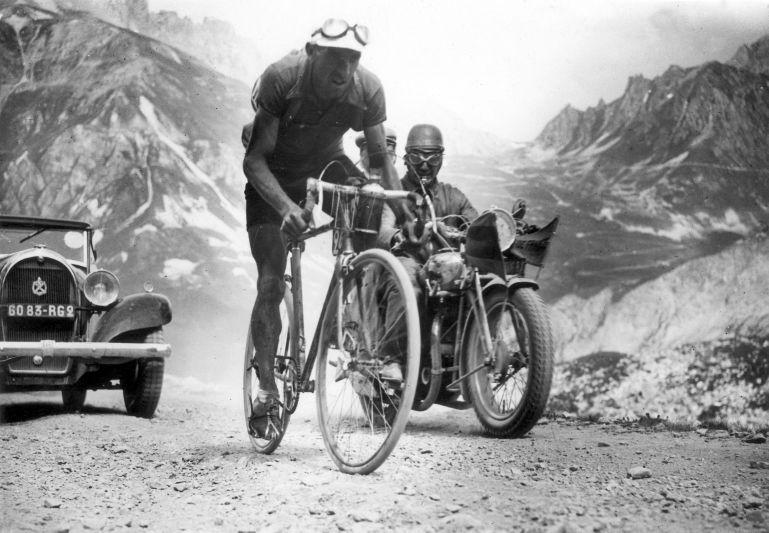
Federico Ezquerra, who was the first to reach the tops of the Télégraphe (not counted for the mountains classification) and the Galibier.

The time that each cyclist required to finish each stage was recorded, and these times were added together for the general classification. If a cyclist had received a time bonus, it was subtracted from this total; all time penalties were added to this total. The cyclist with the least accumulated time was the race leader, identified by the yellow jersey.

For the mountains classification, 14 mountains were selected by the Tour organisation. On the top of these mountains, ten points were given for the first cyclist to pass, nine points to the second cyclist, and so on, until the tenth cyclist who got one point.

For the fifth time, there was a team competition, this time won by the French team. The team classification was calculated in 1934 by adding up the times of the best three cyclists of a team; the team with the least time was the winner. The fifth national team that started, the Belgian team, finished with only two cyclists, so according to the rules in 1934 they were no longer eligible for the team classification.

Fourth-placed Félicien Vervaecke became the winner of the "individuals" category. This classification was calculated in the same way as the general classification, but only the cyclists riding as individuals were eligible.

Classification leadership by stage
Stage	Winner	General classification	Mountains classification (Note: No jersey was awarded to the leader of the mountains classification until a white jersey with red polka dots was introduced in 1975.)	Team classification	Classification for individuals
1	Georges Speicher	Georges Speicher	no award	France	Sylvère Maes
2	René Le Grevès	Antonin Magne	no award	France	Yves Le Goff
3	Roger Lapébie	Antonin Magne	no award	France	Yves Le Goff
4	Roger Lapébie	Antonin Magne	Félicien Vervaecke	France	Félicien Vervaecke
5	René Le Grevès; Georges Speicher	Antonin Magne	Félicien Vervaecke	France	Yves Le Goff
6	Georges Speicher	Antonin Magne	Félicien Vervaecke	France	Ambrogio Morelli
7	René Vietto	Antonin Magne	Federico Ezquerra	France	Ambrogio Morelli
8	Giuseppe Martano	Antonin Magne	Federico Ezquerra	France	Ambrogio Morelli
9	René Vietto	Antonin Magne	Federico Ezquerra	France	Ambrogio Morelli
10	René Le Grevès	Antonin Magne	Federico Ezquerra	France	Ambrogio Morelli
11	René Vietto	Antonin Magne	Federico Ezquerra	France	Félicien Vervaecke
12	Roger Lapébie	Antonin Magne	Federico Ezquerra	France	Félicien Vervaecke
13	Georges Speicher	Antonin Magne	Federico Ezquerra	France	Félicien Vervaecke
14	Roger Lapébie	Antonin Magne	Federico Ezquerra	France	Félicien Vervaecke
15	Roger Lapébie	Antonin Magne	Federico Ezquerra	France	Félicien Vervaecke
16	Adriano Vignoli	Antonin Magne	René Vietto	France	Félicien Vervaecke
17	Antonin Magne	Antonin Magne	René Vietto	France	Félicien Vervaecke
18	René Vietto	Antonin Magne	René Vietto	France	Félicien Vervaecke
19	Ettore Meini	Antonin Magne	René Vietto	France	Félicien Vervaecke
20	Georges Speicher	Antonin Magne	René Vietto	France	Félicien Vervaecke
21a	René Le Grevès	Antonin Magne	René Vietto	France	Félicien Vervaecke
21b	Antonin Magne	Antonin Magne	René Vietto	France	Félicien Vervaecke
22	Raymond Louviot	Antonin Magne	René Vietto	France	Félicien Vervaecke
23	Sylvère Maes	Antonin Magne	René Vietto	France	Félicien Vervaecke
Final		Antonin Magne	René Vietto	France	Félicien Vervaecke

== Final standings ==
=== General classification ===
Final general classification (1–10)
Rank	Rider	Team	Time
1	Antonin Magne (FRA)	France	147h 13' 58"
2	Giuseppe Martano (ITA)	Italy	+ 27' 31"
3	Roger Lapébie (FRA)	France	+ 52' 15"
4	Félicien Vervaecke (BEL)	Individual	+ 57' 40"
5	René Vietto (FRA)	France	+ 59' 02"
6	Ambrogio Morelli (ITA)	Individual	+ 1h 12' 02"
7	Ludwig Geyer (GER)	Germany	+ 1h 12' 51"
8	Sylvère Maes (BEL)	Individual	+ 1h 20' 56"
9	Mariano Cañardo (ESP)	Switzerland/Spain	+ 1h 29' 02"
10	Vicente Trueba (ESP)	Switzerland/Spain	+ 1h 40' 39"

Final general classification (11–39)
Rank	Rider	Team	Time
11	Georges Speicher (FRA)	France	+ 1h 52' 21"
12	Raymond Louviot (FRA)	France	+ 2h 03' 21"
13	Edoardo Molinar (ITA)	Individual	+ 2h 16' 52"
14	Eugenio Gestri (ITA)	Italy	+ 2h 21' 09"
15	Adriano Vignoli (ITA)	Italy	+ 2h 21' 58"
16	Giovanni Cazzulani (ITA)	Italy	+ 2h 32' 38"
17	Albert Büchi (SUI)	Switzerland/Spain	+ 2h 35' 17"
18	Frans Bonduel (BEL)	Belgium	+ 2h 44' 47"
19	Federico Ezquerra (ESP)	Switzerland/Spain	+ 2h 53' 03"
20	August Erne (SUI)	Switzerland/Spain	+ 2h 55' 26"
21	Léon Level (FRA)	Individual	+ 2h 57' 51"
22	Kurt Stoepel (GER)	Germany	+ 3h 01' 13"
23	Dante Franzil (ITA)	Individual	+ 3h 01' 48"
24	Giovanni Gotti (ITA)	Italy	+ 3h 22' 40"
25	René Le Grevès (FRA)	France	+ 3h 26' 26"
26	Theo Herckenrath (BEL)	Individual	+ 3h 30' 51"
27	Vincent Salazard (FRA)	Individual	+ 3h 55' 39"
28	Marcel Renaud (FRA)	Individual	+ 3h 57' 54"
29	Ettore Meini (ITA)	Individual	+ 4h 00' 09"
30	Luciano Montero (ESP)	Switzerland/Spain	+ 4h 03' 25"
31	Jean Wauters (BEL)	Individual	+ 4h 27' 07"
32	Romain Gijssels (BEL)	Belgium	+ 4h 28' 12"
33	Yves Le Goff (FRA)	Individual	+ 4h 29' 40"
34	Sylvain Marcaillou (FRA)	Individual	+ 4h 38' 57"
35	Jean Bidot (FRA)	Individual	+ 4h 39' 37"
36	Fabien Galateau (FRA)	Individual	+ 5h 00' 50"
37	Willi Kutschbach (GER)	Germany	+ 5h 46' 38"
38	Rudolf Risch (GER)	Germany	+ 6h 37' 55"
39	Antonio Folco (ITA)	Italy	+ 7h 15' 36"

=== Mountains classification ===
Mountains in the mountains classification
Stage	Rider	Height	Mountain range	Winner
4	Ballon d'Alsace	1,178 metres (3,865 ft)	Vosges	Félicien Vervaecke
6	Aravis	1,498 metres (4,915 ft)	Alps	Félicien Vervaecke
7	Galibier	2,556 metres (8,386 ft)	Alps	Federico Ezquerra
8	Côte de Laffrey	900 metres (3,000 ft)	Alps	Vicente Trueba
9	Vars	2,110 metres (6,920 ft)	Alps	René Vietto
9	Allos	2,250 metres (7,380 ft)	Alps	René Vietto
11	Braus	1,002 metres (3,287 ft)	Alps-Maritimes	René Vietto
11	Castillon	706 metres (2,316 ft)	Alps-Maritimes	René Vietto
16	Col de Port	1,249 metres (4,098 ft)	Pyrenees	René Vietto
16	Portet d'Aspet	1,069 metres (3,507 ft)	Pyrenees	Adriano Vignoli
17	Peyresourde	1,569 metres (5,148 ft)	Pyrenees	René Vietto
17	Aspin	1,489 metres (4,885 ft)	Pyrenees	Antonin Magne
18	Tourmalet	2,115 metres (6,939 ft)	Pyrenees	René Vietto
18	Aubisque	1,709 metres (5,607 ft)	Pyrenees	René Vietto

Final mountains classification (1–10)
Rank	Rider	Team	Points
1	René Vietto (FRA)	France	111
2	Vicente Trueba (ESP)	Switzerland/Spain	93 or 95
3	Giuseppe Martano (ITA)	Italy	78
4	Félicien Vervaecke (BEL)	Individual	76
5	Federico Ezquerra (ESP)	Switzerland/Spain	75
6	Antonin Magne (FRA)	France	69
7	Sylvère Maes (BEL)	Individual	54
8	Edoardo Molinar (ITA)	Individual	43
9	Ambrogio Morelli (ITA)	Individual	36
10	Mariano Cañardo (ESP)	Switzerland/Spain	21

=== Team classification ===
Final team classification
Rank	Team	Time
1	France	443h 42' 41"
2	Italy	+ 3h 09' 51"
3	Switzerland/Spain	+ 3h 44' 24"
4	Germany	+ 8h 09' 55"

== Aftermath ==
The individual time trial that was introduced in 1934 was a success, and has been used since then in almost every year.

René Vietto, who had sacrificed his Tour chances for his team leader Magne, was convinced that he could have won the Tour instead.

== Bibliography ==
- Augendre, Jacques (2016). Guide historique [Historical guide] (PDF) (in French). Paris: Amaury Sport Organisation. Archived (PDF) from the original on 17 August 2016.
- Cossins, Peter (2013). Le Tour 100: The definitive history of the world's greatest race. London: Cassell. ISBN 978-1-84403-759-9.
- McGann, Bill; McGann, Carol (2006). The Story of the Tour de France: 1903–1964. Vol. 1. Indianapolis, IN: Dog Ear Publishing. ISBN 978-1-59858-180-5.
- Nauright, John; Parrish, Charles (2012). Sports Around the World: History, Culture, and Practice. Vol. 2. Santa Barbara, CA: ABC-CLIO. ISBN 978-1-59884-300-2.
