= Johanna Rosine Wagner =

Mother of Richard Wagner

Johanna Rosine Wagner, née Pätz (19 September 1774, Weißenfels – 9 January 1848, Leipzig), was the mother of the composer, writer, theater director, and conductor Richard Wagner (1813–1883). Four of her other children became actresses or opera singers.

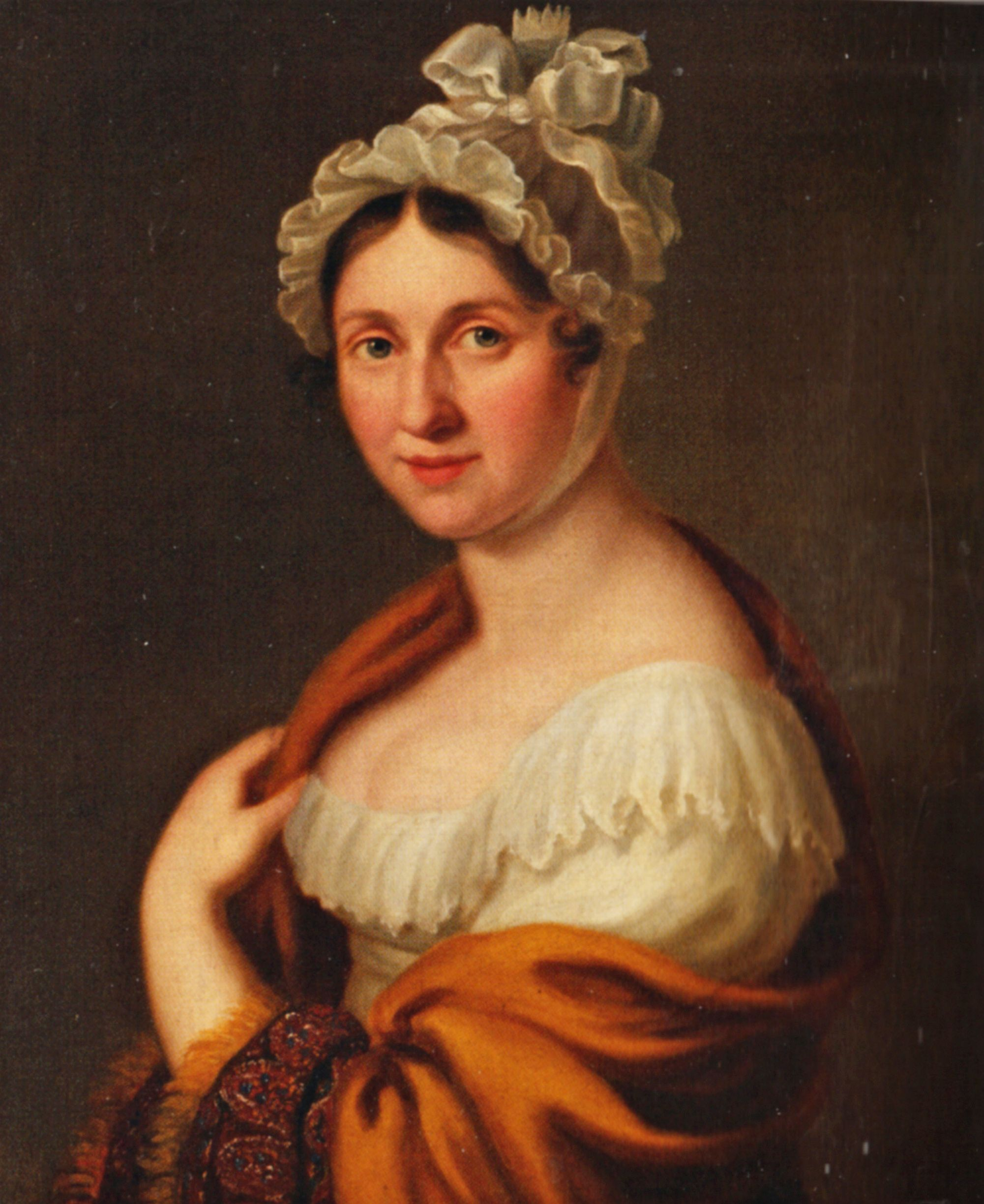
Johanna Rosine Wagner (1813) Oil painting by Ludwig Geyer

== Life ==
=== Early life ===
Johanna Rosine was the daughter of the Weißenfels baker Johann Gottlob Pätz (1741–1802) and his wife Dorothea Erdmuth, née Iglisch (1742–1789). Her mother died before Johanna's 15th birthday, and when her father married a younger woman soon after, Johanna, now fifteen years old, left home.

=== With Prince Friedrich Ferdinand Constantin ===
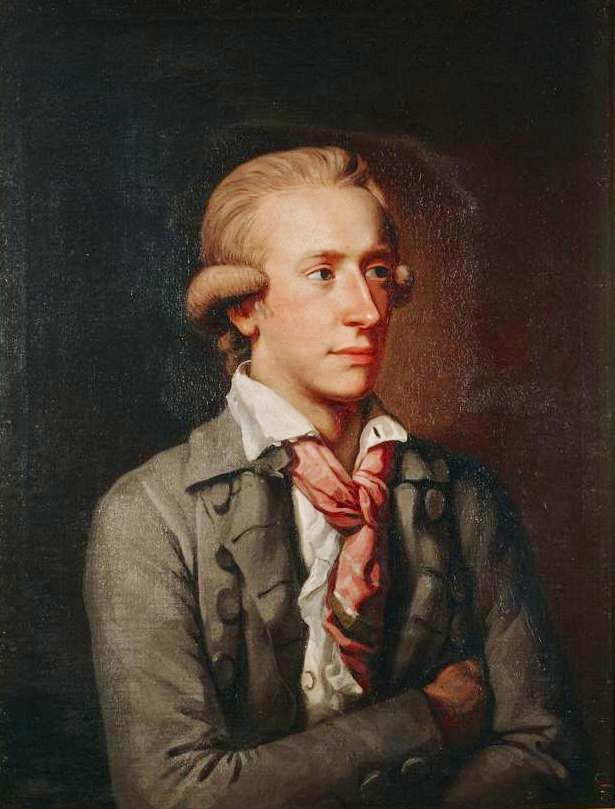
Prince Friedrich Ferdinand Constantin (1781) Artist: Johann Heinrich Wilhelm Tischbein (1751–1829)

She met the frivolous Prince Frederick Ferdinand Constantin of Saxe-Weimar-Eisenach (1758–1793), sixteen years her senior, whose regiment was stationed in Weissenfels in 1790. He placed her in Madame Hesse's boarding house in Leipzig, in the Winckler House in Brühl (later Lattermann's Court), financed everything, and visited her regularly. That the relationship may have gone beyond a love affair is suggested by the fact that he had her taught by a language and writing teacher, as well as by a milliner. The prince died in 1793, and Johanna's dream of rising to higher social circles was shattered. The Weimar court kept her as a "foster daughter" with a lump sum of 50 Reichsthalers.

=== Marriage to Carl Friedrich Wilhelm Wagner ===
For the next few years, Johanna Rosine supported herself as a milliner. Subsequently, she met Carl Friedrich Wilhelm Wagner (1770–1813). He had studied law and was a theater enthusiast and amateur actor. In 1797, he obtained a position as vice-actuary at the city court, which enabled him to start a family. On 2 June 1798, the two married in the church in Schönefeld, then still a village northeast of Leipzig.

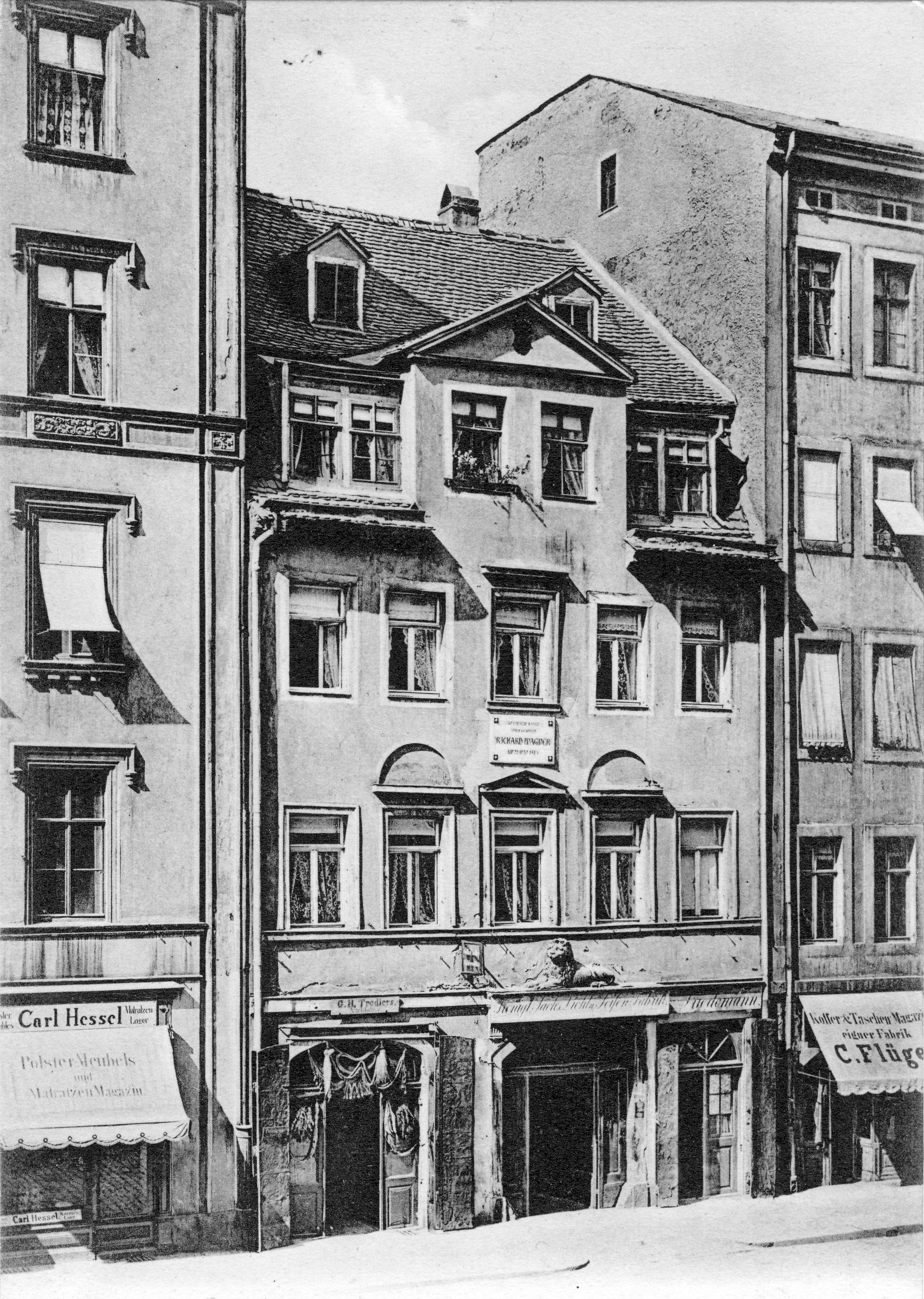
Wagner family home in Brühl, as it stood in 1885 – from a Postcard by Hermann Walter (1838–1909)

In the following fifteen years of marriage, the couple had nine children: Albert (* 2 March 1799), Carl Gustav (* 21 July 1801), Rosalie (*4 March 1803), Julius (*7 August 1804), Luise (*14 December 1805), Clara (*29 November 1807), Maria Theresia (*1 April 1809), Ottilie (*4 March 1811), and finally Richard (*22 May 1813). Except for the first two, they were born in the house called Zum Roten und Weißen Löwen (Red and White Lion) in Brühl, where the family's apartment was located on the second floor from 1802 onwards.

Friedrich Wagner, who had been a police clerk since 1 January 1811, was responsible for overseeing the city's field hospitals after the Battle of the Nations. He contracted typhus and died on 25 November 1813.

The Wagner couple had long been friends with the painter, writer, and actor Ludwig Geyer (1779–1821) through their shared passion for the theater. He now took care of the widow and the children, who loved him very much.

=== Marriage to Ludwig Geyer ===
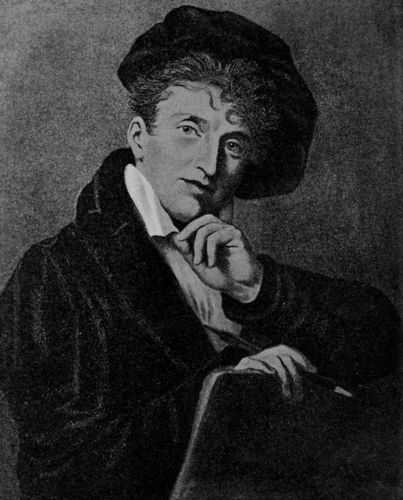
Ludwig Geyer – painter unidentified

On 28 August 1814, Geyer, four years her junior, married the widow Wagner (who was by now pregnant) in the church in Pötewitz near Zeitz. In 1814, the family moved with seven children – Carl Gustav and Marie Theresia had already died – to Dresden, where Geyer had become a court actor. Their daughter, Augusta Cäcilie Geyer, was born there on February 26, 1815. A rumour later sparked by Friedrich Nietzsche that Geyer was also Richard's father has not been substantiated. Geyer continued in the theater, writing scripts and singing under Carl Maria von Weber, who also socialized with the Geyer family.

=== Widowhood again ===
After seven years of family happiness, Ludwig Geyer died on 30 September 1821. Geyer had recognized and encouraged the Wagner children's musical talent and helped determine their path in life. Albert Wagner made his operatic debut in Leipzig in 1819. Rosalie was at the Dresden Theater from 1818 and a court actress from 1820. Luise trained as an actress, but married the Leipzig publisher Friedrich Brockhaus (1800–1865) at the age of 23 and gave up her career. Klara made her debut as an opera singer in Dresden in 1824 at the age of 16. When Rosalie accepted an engagement in Leipzig in 1827, Johanna Rosine moved with the rest of the family to Leipzig, where she received an annual pension of 60 Reichstaler from the city.

=== Richard's education ===
Richard, who had attended the Kreuzschule in Dresden as Richard Geyer, now attended the Nikolaischule in Leipzig as Richard Wagner and later the Thomasschule, which he left without a high school diploma. With his interest in music now ignited, he began composing, initially unsuccessfully.

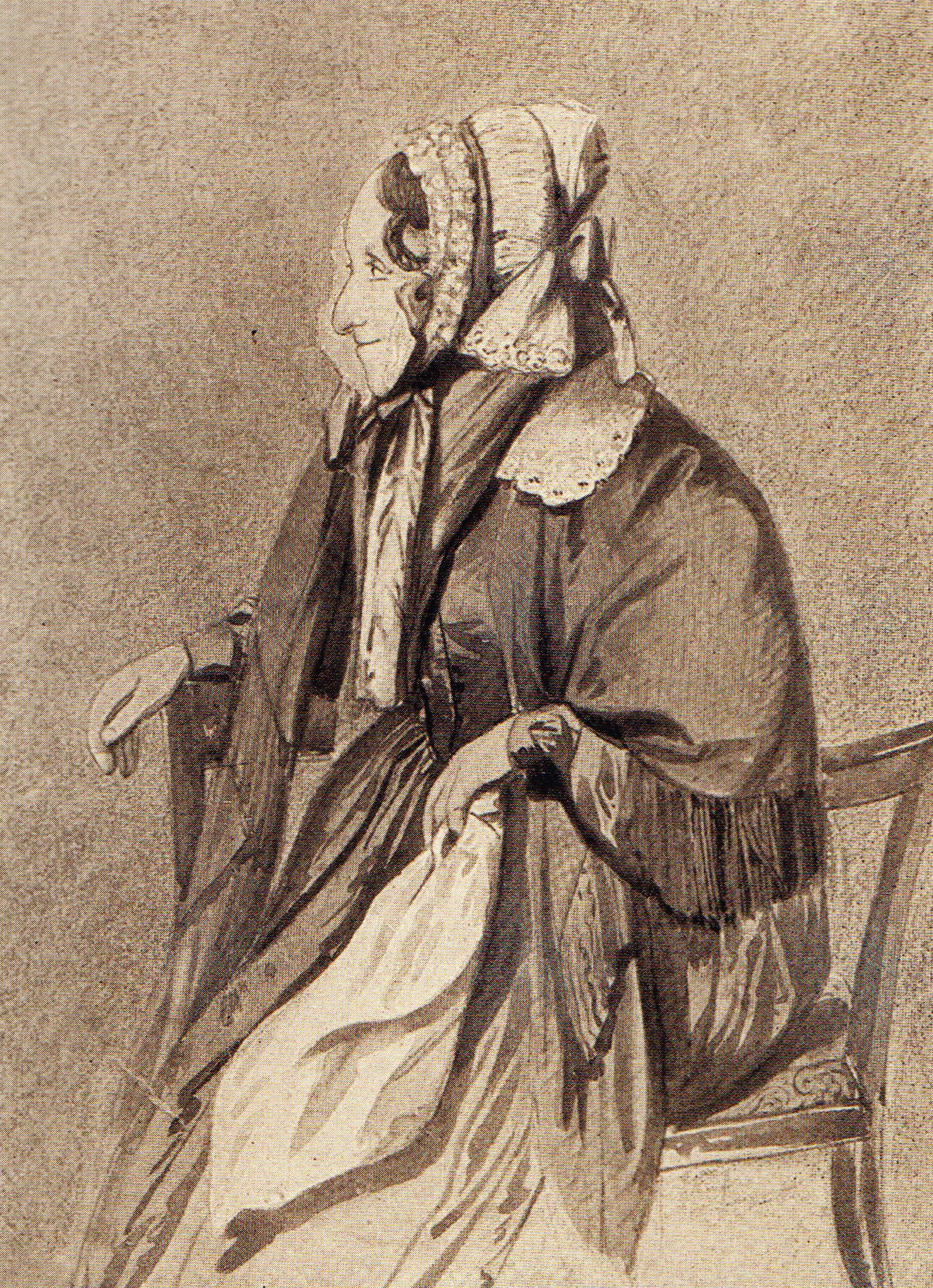
Portrait of Johanna Rosine Wagner-Geyer in her old age (around 1845) – Artist: Auguste Böhm, circa 1845

In 1831, he began studying music at the University of Leipzig, but in 1834, after causing his mother considerable trouble, he traveled to Würzburg to join his brother Albert.

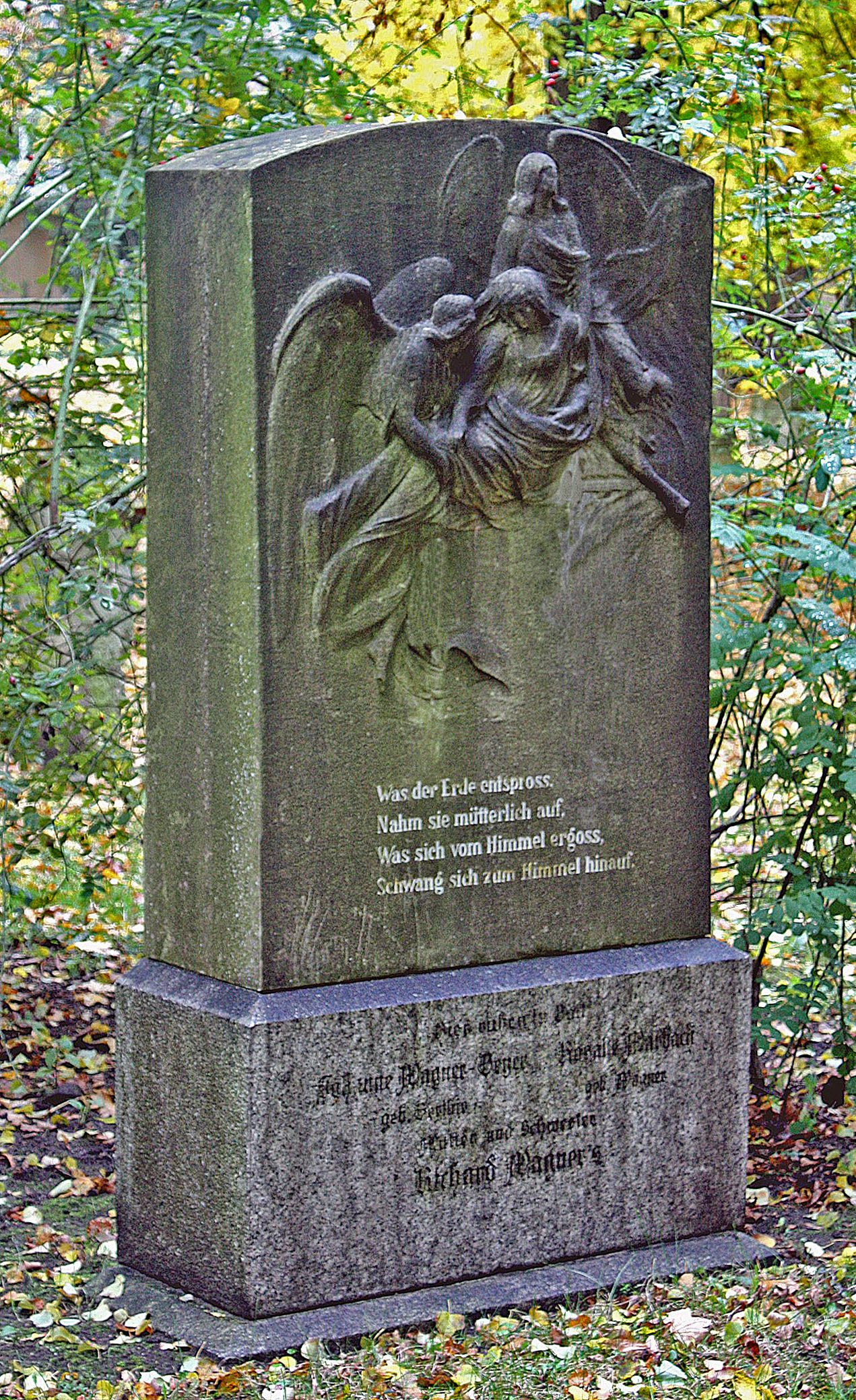
Memorial stone at the Old St. John's Cemetery in Leipzig (2009)

However, she was ultimately able to witness his triumph when his opera Rienzi premiered in Dresden in 1842, and he instantly became famous.

== Death ==
Johanna Rosine Wagner-Geyer died in Leipzig in 1848 at the age of 73 and was buried in the Old St. John's Cemetery. Her daughter Rosalie, née Marbach, had also been buried there in 1837. In 1910, Rosalie's daughter erected a memorial stone for her mother and grandmother.

== Literature ==
- Hamann, Brigitte (2005). The Wagner Family. Reinbek near Hamburg: Rowohlt Taschenbuch-Verlag. ISBN 978-3-499-50658-1.
- Oehme, Ursula (2024). "Of Soothing Cheerfulness and Practical Skill – On the 250th Birthday of Richard Wagner's Mother". Leipziger Blätter (84): 82–95.
