= Dante Franzil =

Italian cyclist

Personal information
- Born: 27 December 1910
- Died: 23 August 1981 (aged 70)

Cycling career
- Sport: Cycling
- Discipline: Road
- Role: Rider

Dante Franzil (27 December 1910 – 23 August 1981) was an Italian racing cyclist. He rode in the 1934 Tour de France.
