= Gabriel Viratelle =

French cyclist

Personal information
- Born: 13 June 1910
- Died: 2 May 1971 (aged 60)

Cycling career
- Sport: Cycling
- Discipline: Road
- Role: Rider

Gabriel Viratelle (13 June 1910 – 2 May 1971) was a French racing cyclist. He rode in the 1934 Tour de France.
