= Frans Dictus =

Belgian cyclist

Personal information
- Born: 5 May 1907
- Died: 21 January 1994 (aged 86)

Cycling career
- Sport: Cycling
- Discipline: Road
- Role: Rider

Frans Dictus (5 May 1907 – 21 January 1994) was a Belgian racing cyclist. He rode in the 1934 Tour de France.
