= August Erne =

Swiss cyclist

Personal information
- Born: 15 February 1905 Leibstadt, Switzerland
- Died: 15 October 1987 (aged 82) Leibstadt, Switzerland

Cycling career
- Sport: Cycling
- Role: Rider

August Erne (15 February 1905 – 15 October 1987) was a Swiss racing cyclist. He was the Swiss National Road Race champion in 1932. He also rode in the 1932 and 1934 Tour de France.
