= Antonio Folco =

Italian cyclist

Personal information
- Full name: Antonio Folco
- Born: 4 October 1906 Novi Ligure, Italy
- Died: 28 June 1983 (aged 76)

Cycling career
- Sport: Cycling
- Role: Rider

Antonio Folco (4 October 1906 – 28 June 1983) was an Italian racing cyclist. He finished in last place in the 1934 Tour de France.
