= Ludwig Geyer =

German painter

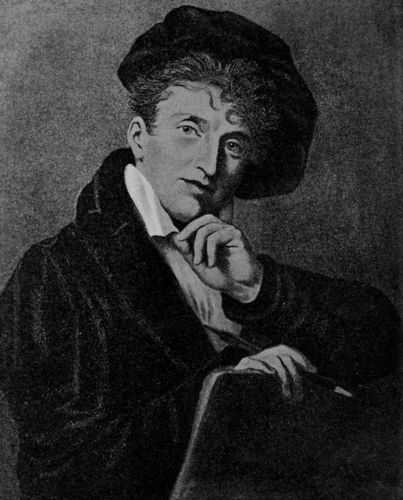
Ludwig Geyer.

Ludwig Heinrich Christian Geyer (21 January 1779 – 30 September 1821) was a German actor, playwright, and painter.

== Life and career ==
Born in Eisleben, he was the stepfather of composer Richard Wagner, whose biological father had died some six months after his birth. According to Wagner's biographer Carl Friedrich Glasenapp, Geyer married Wagner's mother Johanna Rosine (née Pätz) after Wagner's birth; for his first few years Richard went under the surname Geyer. However, it is possible that Geyer and Johanna did not marry legally, as no record of the marriage has been found.

In his 'Autobiographic Sketch,' Wagner describes him as 'a comedian and a painter; he was also the author of a few stage plays, of which one, ... The Slaughter of the Innocents, had a certain success'. On his deathbed, according to Wagner, Geyer asked his mother 'has he perchance a talent for music?'.

Geyer grew up in Artern and attended gymnasium in Eisleben. He started studying jurisprudence at the University of Leipzig but had to quit in 1799 when his father died after an accident. Geyer turned his hobby to his profession and earned the living expenses for his family by selling small portrait paintings.

In 1801, he came back to Leipzig where he met (Carl) Friedrich Wagner who cared for him like a father. It was at his advice that Geyer went to the stage. He performed in little theaters in towns such as Magdeburg, Braunschweig, Stettin and Breslau. In Magdeburg, he became a Freemason. In 1809, Geyer joined the well known Secondasche Gesellschaft in Leipzig, whose members were given the rank of court actors.

Friedrich Wagner died after the Battle of Leipzig of typhus and Geyer married his widow. In 1814, his theatre company became part of the royal ensemble in Dresden where he made a friendship with Carl Maria von Weber. In 1815, Geyer's daughter Augusta Cäcilie was born, who later married the publisher Eduard Avenarius and was the mother of Richard Avenarius and Ferdinand Avenarius.

Later in life, in the course of preparing his autobiography, Mein Leben, Wagner received from his sister Cäcilie a cache of letters written by Geyer that led him to believe that Geyer was his biological father, and possibly (and incorrectly) to believe that Geyer was Jewish; the correspondence was subsequently lost or, some have suggested, destroyed by Wagner. Geyer's relation to Wagner was one of several controversies surrounding the composer during his lifetime and afterward.

== See also ==
- List of German painters

== Sources ==
- Gutman, Robert W. (1990), Richard Wagner: The Man, his Mind and his Music, New York: Harcourt, Brace and Jovanovich ISBN 978-0-15-677615-8
