= Edgard De Caluwé =

Belgian cyclist

Edgard de Caluwé
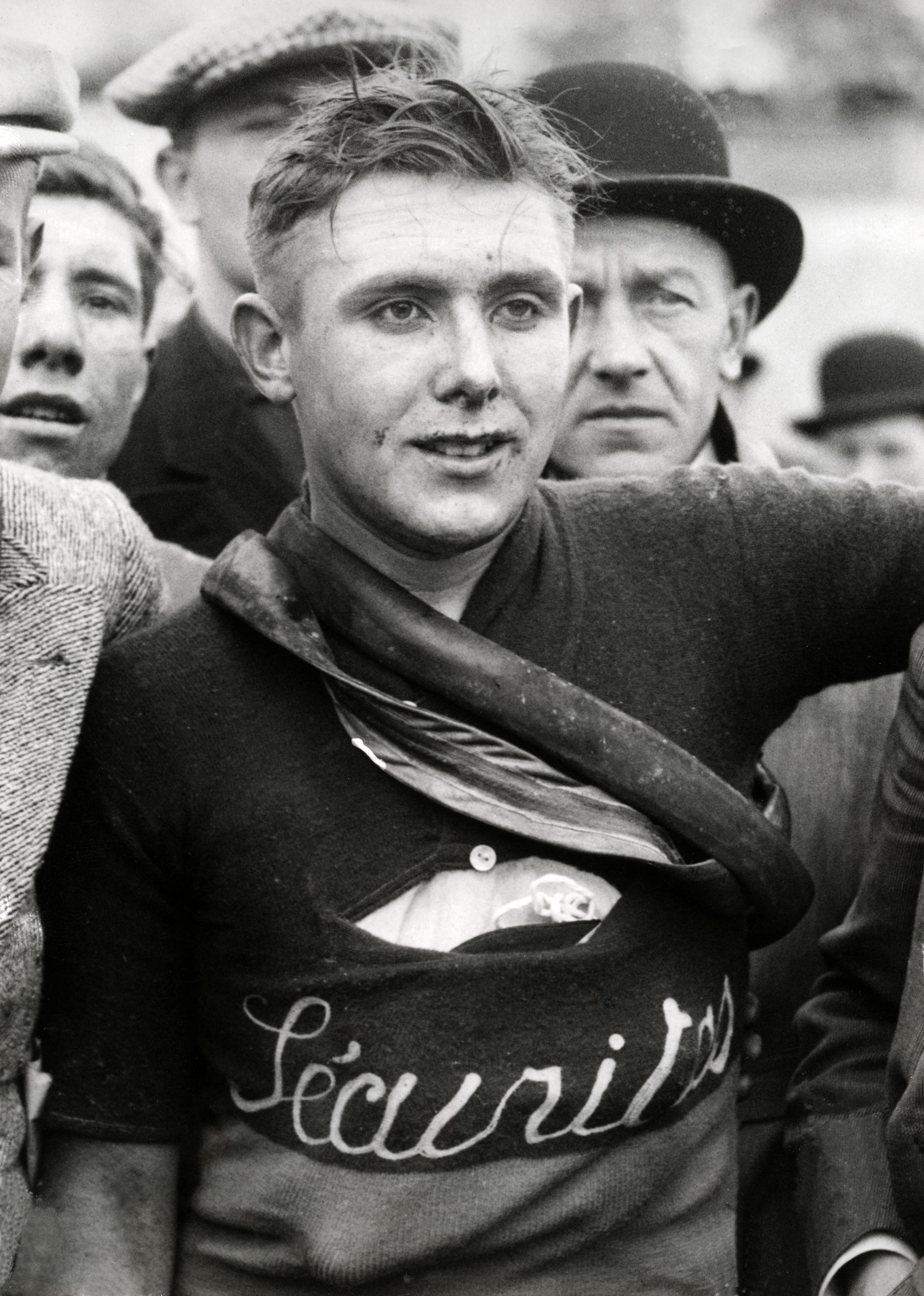
- At the 1933 Tour of Flanders

Personal information
- Born: 1 July 1913 Denderwindeke
- Died: 16 May 1985 (aged 71) Geraardsbergen

Cycling career
- Sport: Cycling
- Discipline: Road
- Role: Rider

Professional teams
- 1934-1938: Dilecta-Wolber
- 1938: Diamant
- 1938: Allegro
- 1939-1946: Dilecta-Wolber
- 1947: Bertin-Wolber

Edgard De Caluwé (1 July 1913 in Denderwindeke – 16 May 1985 in Geraardsbergen) was a Belgian cyclist.

He had twenty victories as a professional from 1933 to 1947. He won the Paris-Brussels and Bordeaux-Paris in 1935. He finished second in the Tour of Flanders in 1936 and won it in 1938.

His career was interrupted by World War II. He also won some victories after the war, but his best years were before it.

He also participated in the Tour de France twice, without much success.

The Grote Prijs Beeckman-De Caluwé in Ninove has been named after him.

== Major results ==
1935

Paris-Brussels
Bordeaux-Paris

1937

7th of Paris–Roubaix

1938

Tour of Flanders

1945

Ninove

== Results in the Tour de France ==
- 1934: DNF
- 1935: DNF
