= Ettore Meini =

Italian cyclist

Personal information
- Full name: Ettore Meini
- Born: 5 January 1903 Cascina, Italy
- Died: 29 August 1961 (aged 58) Pisa, Italy

Cycling career
- Sport: Cycling
- Discipline: Road
- Role: Rider

Major wins
- 5 stages Giro d'Italia

Ettore Meini (5 January 1903 – 29 August 1961) was an Italian professional road bicycle racer. Meini has won 5 stages in the Giro d'Italia, and one stage in the 1934 Tour de France.

== Major results ==
1928
Coppa Cavacciocchi
1929
Coppa Zucchi
1930
Coppa Cavacciocchi
1931
Giro d'Italia:

Winner stage 6

Giro dell'Umbria
Giro della Romagna
1932
Giro d'Italia:

Winner stages 10 and 12

Milano – La Spezia
1933
Giro d'Italia:

Winner stages 14 and 15

1934
Tour de France:

Winner stage 19
