= René Vietto =

French cyclist

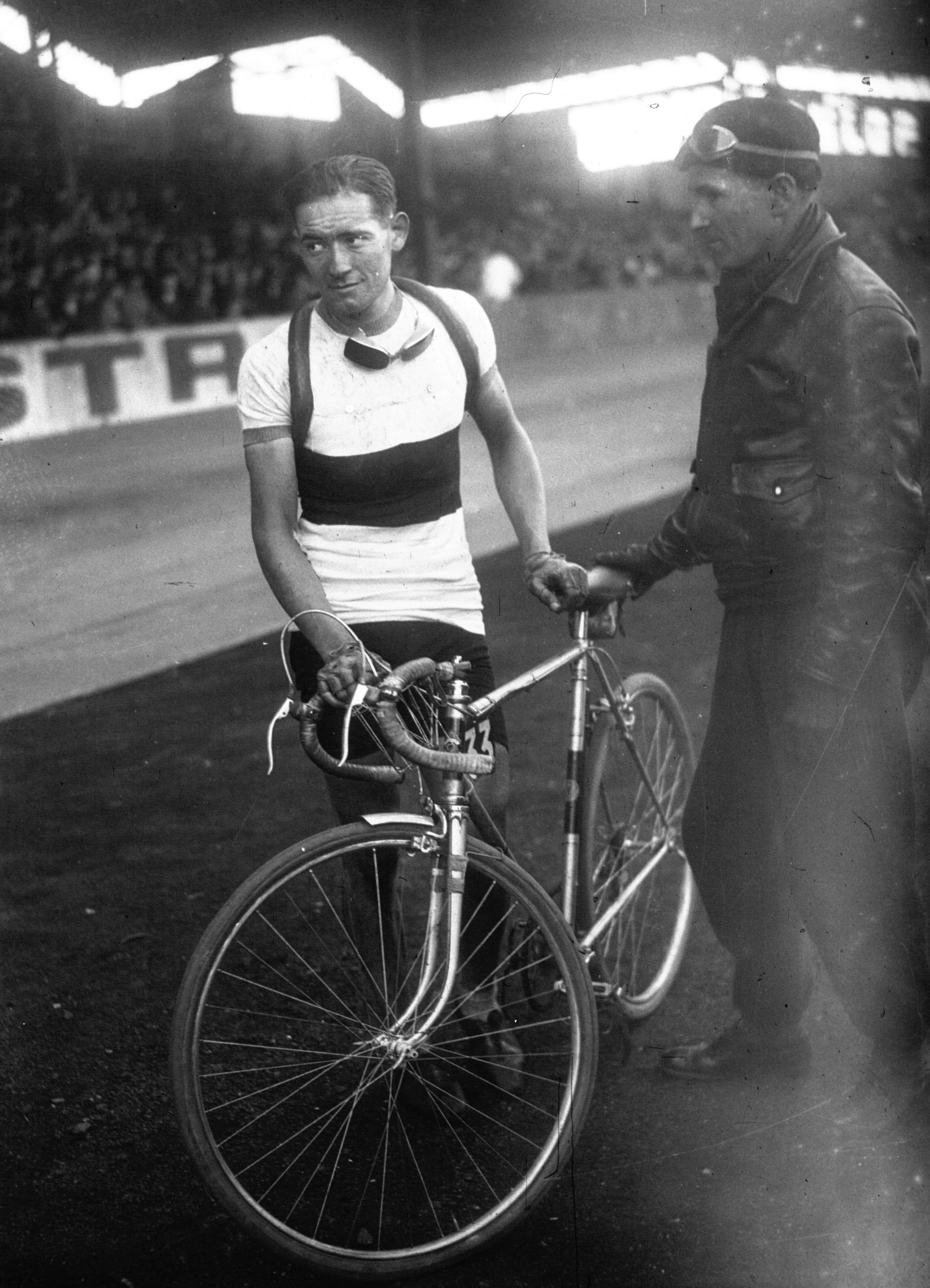

Personal information
- Full name: René Vietto
- Nickname: Le roi René (King René)
- Born: 17 February 1914 Le Cannet, France
- Died: 14 October 1988 (aged 74) Orange, France

Cycling career
- Sport: Cycling
- Discipline: Road
- Role: Rider
- Rider type: Climber

Major wins
- Grand Tours Tour de France Mountains classification (1934) 8 individual stages (1934, 1935, 1947) Stage races Paris–Nice (1935)

René Vietto (17 February 1914 – 14 October 1988) was a French road racing cyclist.

In the 1934 Tour de France, Vietto, a relative unknown, got wings on the mountains. This was not a surprise, because he had won the Grand Prix Wolber. He was prepared for the Alps and won easily on the steepest terrain. After he won the two major Alpine stages, journalists reported that this 'boy' could be the purest mountain climber that France knew.

Vietto rode the Tour de France for the first time in 1934, as member of the French national team, in support of his team leader Antonin Magne. Magne was leading the race since the second stage; Vietto was already more than 50 minutes behind him after the sixth stage. But Vietto excelled in the mountains, winning stages 7, 9 and 11.

In the 16th stage, Vietto was again performing well in the mountains. He passed first on the Col de Port and second on the Col de Portet d'Aspet behind the escaped Adriano Vignoli, thereby taking the lead in the mountains classification. After the top, Magne's wheel broke. Vietto was closeby, so he gave his wheel to Magne. A photograph shows Vietto sitting on a stone wall, waiting for a new wheel. Vietto's help enabled Magne to continue without much time loss; Vietto was not able to get back to Magne's group, and finished four minutes behind Magne, who remained four minutes behind Vignoli.

On the next day, newspaper reports focused on Vietto's lead in the mountains classification. Him giving his wheel to Magne was seen as the expected thing to do: Vietto was not leading the stage, and was too far behind in the general classification.

Over time, the legend of this story grew. It was ignored that Vignoli had already escaped when the incident happened, and then it was ignored that Vietto was already far behind in the general classification, and that Vietto was not far away from Magne, until the story had evolved to say that Vietto gave away a Tour victory, rode back up the mountain and waited for fifteen minutes.

Vietto's actions made him a star in France. The image of a 20-year-old who sacrificed his chance of winning a Tour stage doubled his popularity. Vietto won the mountains classification; he finished 5th overall, almost 1 hour behind Magne. Vietto never won the Tour. He was closest in 1939, when he gained the yellow jersey in Lorient in one of the first stages, but in the mountains, once his favorite place, he was left by Sylvère Maes. After that Tour, war broke out and the race wasn't held until 1947. Vietto, still loved, attacked from the second stage. As a result, he took the yellow jersey in Brussels, to lose it two days before the finish, in a time trial of 139 km.

Despite failing to hold the lead, Vietto wore the yellow jersey for 15 stages during the 1939 Tour de France and during the 1947 Tour de France for 14 stages. He finished second in 1939, fifth in 1934 and 1947 and eighth in 1935. Until Fabian Cancellara broke his record in the 2012 Tour de France, Vietto had the highest career yellow jersey statistics of anyone to never win the Tour de France overall.

Vietto lost a toe to sepsis in 1947. Legend has it that Vietto insisted his domestique, Apo Lazaridès, cut off one of his own toes to match. According to legend, Vietto's toe is in formaldehyde in a bar in Marseille.

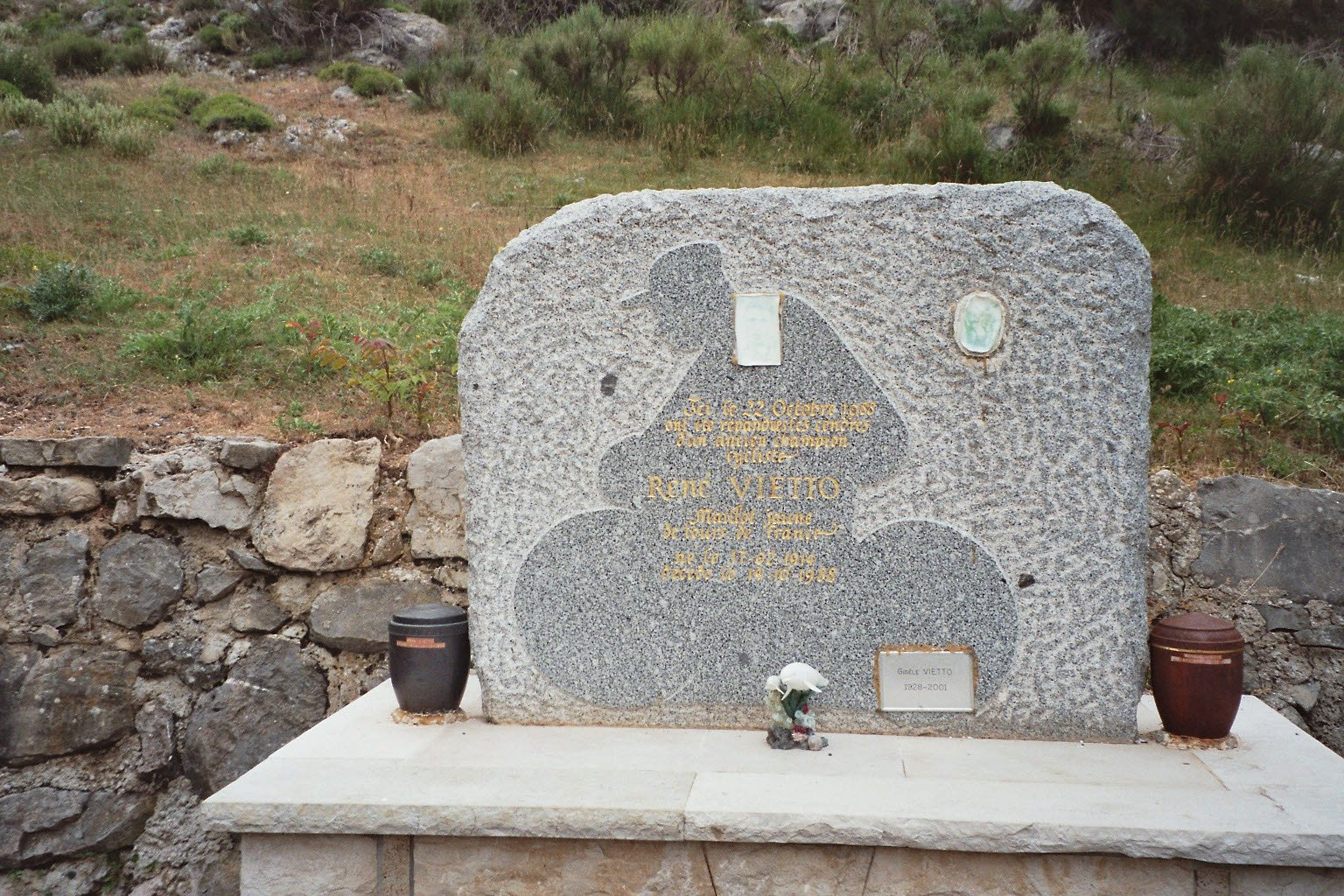
Tombstone of Vietto on the Col de Braus

== Major results ==
1934
Tour de France:

Mountains classification
Winner stage 7, 9, 11 and 18
5th place overall classification

Grand Prix Wolber
1935
Tour de France:

Winner stage 6 and 9
8th place overall classification

Paris–Nice
1939
Tour de France:

2nd place overall classification
holding yellow jersey for 11 days

1942
Vuelta a espana:

Winner stage 8 and 16b

1943
Circuit du Midi
1946
Grand Prix de la République
1947
Tour de France:

Winner stage 2 and 9
5th place overall classification
holding yellow jersey for 15 days
