= Théo Herckenrath =

Belgian cyclist

Personal information
- Born: 22 July 1911 Aalst, Belgium
- Died: 20 March 1973 (aged 61) Hoogstraten, Belgium

Cycling career
- Sport: Cycling
- Role: Rider

Théo Herckenrath (22 July 1911 – 20 March 1973) was a Belgian racing cyclist. He won the 1934 edition of the Liège–Bastogne–Liège.
