= Willy Kutschbach =

German cyclist

Personal information
- Full name: Willy Kutschbach
- Born: 27 May 1907 Greiz, Germany
- Died: 24 June 1978 (aged 71) Berlin, Germany

Cycling career
- Sport: Cycling
- Role: Rider

Willy Kutschbach (27 May 1907 – 24 June 1978) was a German racing cyclist. He finished in last place in the 1935 Tour de France.
