= Raymond Louviot =

French-Swiss cyclist

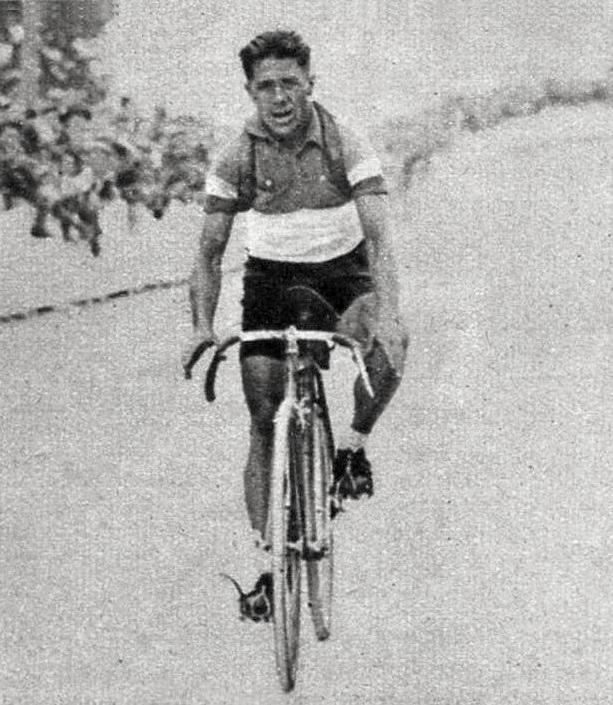
- Raymond Louviot, 1934

Personal information
- Full name: Raymond Louviot
- Born: 17 December 1908 Granges, Switzerland
- Died: 14 May 1969 (aged 60) Dunkirk, France

Cycling career
- Sport: Cycling
- Discipline: Road
- Role: Rider

Major wins
- French national road race championship (1934); GP des nations (1933); GP Ouest-France (1947)

Raymond Louviot (17 December 1908 – 14 May 1969) was a French professional road bicycle racer. He was the grandfather of cyclist Philippe Louviot.

He became a team manager after retirement. The British cyclist, Brian Robinson, accuses a commercial tie-up between Louviot and Miguel Poblet a rival in another team, for denying him first place in the 1957 Milan–San Remo. Robinson said:

My manager, Raymond Louviot, had a tie-up in the cycle trade with Poblet. He told me that if Poblet was anywhere near me it was my job to get him over the line first. I buggered off up a hill, then my manager came up and told me 'Remember what I told you.' Poblet won, I was third, that is my biggest regret. If I had won I would have been made for life.

== Major results ==
1933
Tour du Midi
Grand Prix des Nations
1934
France national road race championship
Tour de France:

Winner stage 22

1936
Paris - Sedan
1937
Circuit des Deux-Sèvres
Paris - Soissons
Tour du Sud-Ouest
1938
Paris - Rennes
1939
Tour de France:

Winner stage 4

1940
Critérium de France
1941
GP de l'Auto
Paris - Nantes
1947
GP Ouest-France
