= Vincent Salazard =

French cyclist

Personal information
- Born: 28 February 1909
- Died: 8 March 1993 (aged 84)

Cycling career
- Sport: Cycling
- Discipline: Road
- Role: Rider

Vincent Salazard (28 February 1909 – 8 March 1993) was a French racing cyclist. He rode in the 1934 Tour de France.
