= Yves Le Goff =

French cyclist

Personal information
- Born: 25 February 1907
- Died: 11 August 1988 (aged 81)

Cycling career
- Sport: Cycling
- Discipline: Road
- Role: Rider

Yves Le Goff (25 February 1907 – 11 August 1988) was a French racing cyclist. He rode in the 1932 Tour de France.
