= Antonin Magne =

French cyclist (1904–1983)

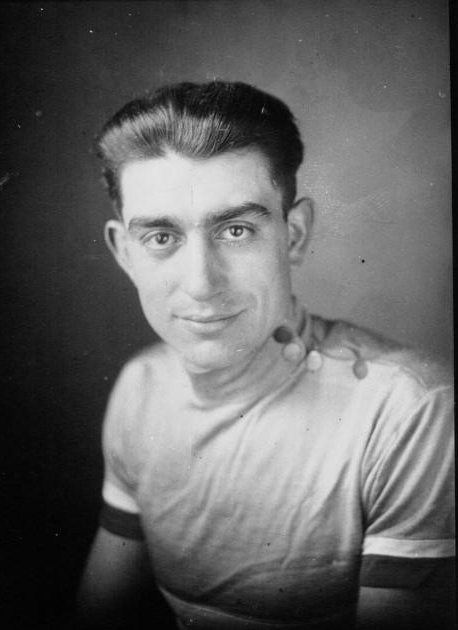
- Magne in 1931

Personal information
- Full name: Antonin Magne
- Nicknames: Tonin le sage (Tonin the Sage), Tonin le taciturne (Tonin the Taciturn)
- Born: 15 January 1904 Ytrac, France
- Died: 8 September 1983 (aged 79) Arcachon, France

Cycling career
- Sport: Cycling
- Discipline: Road
- Role: Rider

Major wins
- Grand Tours Tour de France General classification (1931, 1934) 10 individual stages (1927, 1928, 1930, 1931, 1934, 1938) One-day races and Classics Road Race World Championships (1936) Grand Prix des Nations (1934, 1935, 1936) Paris–Saint-Quentin (1926) Paris–Limoges (1927, 1929) GP Wolber (1927) Paris–Vichy (1930) Challenge Sedis (1934, 1936)
Medal record
Representing France
Men's road bicycle racing
World Championships
Gold medal – first place	1936 Bern	Elite Men's Road Race
Silver medal – second place	1933 Montlhéry	Elite Men's Road Race

Antonin Magne (pronounced [ɑ̃.tɔ.nɛ̃ maɲ]; 15 February 1904 – 8 September 1983) was a French cyclist who won the Tour de France in 1931 and 1934. He raced as a professional from 1927 to 1939 and then became a team manager. The French rider and then journalist, Jean Bobet, described him in Sporting Cyclist as "a most uninterviewable character" and "a man who withdraws into a shell as soon as he meets a journalist." His taciturn character earned him the nickname of The Monk when he was racing.

== Professional cycling career ==
=== Early career ===
Magne became a professional cyclist in 1927. He was part of the Alleluia Team which, with Pierre Magne, Julien Moineau, Marius Gallotini, Arsène Alancourt, and André Cauet, won the 1927 GP Wolber, considered the unofficial world road race championship.

Magne first rode the Tour in 1927, alongside André Leducq in the France team.

=== 1931 Tour de France ===
In 1931, defending champion André Leducq was not in good shape, so Magne took over the role as team leader. Although he was repeatedly attacked by the Italian Antonio Pesanti and the Belgian, Jef Demuysere, Magne was able to win the race.

=== 1932 to 1933 ===
In 1932, Magne did not defend his Tour de France title; instead he started in the Giro d'Italia, but could not impress. In 1933, Magne returned in the Tour de France, and finished in 8th place.

=== 1934 Tour de France ===
In 1934, Magne again started in the Tour de France, in a strong French team. Magne led from the second day and his team won 19 of the 23 stages, Magne himself winning two stages, including the first time trial in the Tour de France, over 80 km from La Roche-sur-Yon to Nantes. His hopes looked over when he broke a wheel on the descent from l'Hospitalet to Ax-les-Thermes in the Pyrenees. He was rescued by the youngest rider in his team, René Vietto, who handed him his own wheel despite being in third place himself. The next day Magne again had trouble. Vietto was just ahead of him on the Col de Portet d'Aspet, turned and saw his leader waving a wheel and rode back down the hill to hand him his own. Vietto wept by the roadside as he waited for another wheel. Magne won the Tour and France dominated it but Vietto, who finished fifth, was the hero. He also won the Grand Prix des Nations, the unofficial world championship of the individual time trial, for the first time that year.

=== Late career ===
In 1935 and 1936, Magne again won the Grand Prix des Nations. In 1935, he started in the Tour, but left the race halfway while in second place in the general classification, after a crash on the bottom of the Galibier.

In 1936, Magne rode strong in the Tour, and finished in second place, behind Sylvère Maes. Afterwards, he became world champion.

In 1937, Magne did not start in the Tour, saying that he had already decided this in 1936, and that he was still recuperating from a car accident in May. He became the official starter of the 1937 Tour instead.

In 1938, Magne rode the Tour de France for the last time, and in the last stage he crossed the finishline together with André Leducq, who also rode the Tour for the last time; both were declared winner of that stage.

== Post-racing career ==
Upon retirement, Magne became a directeur sportif for several successful riders, such as Louison Bobet and Raymond Poulidor in the Mercier team. He is credited with being a mentor to the great riders of the era, and is considered to be one of the best directeurs sportif in the sport. He never referred to his riders by the informal "tu" but always as "vous"; riders addressed him a "Monsieur Magne". Louis Caput replaced Antonin Magne as manager of Fagor-Mercier in 1970.

Magne lived for much of his life at Livry-Gargan, in the département of Seine-Saint-Denis near Paris. In 2004, the Tour de France honoured the centenary of his birth with a stage finish there. Magne was made a Chevalier de la Légion d'Honneur in 1962.

== Career achievements ==
=== Major results ===
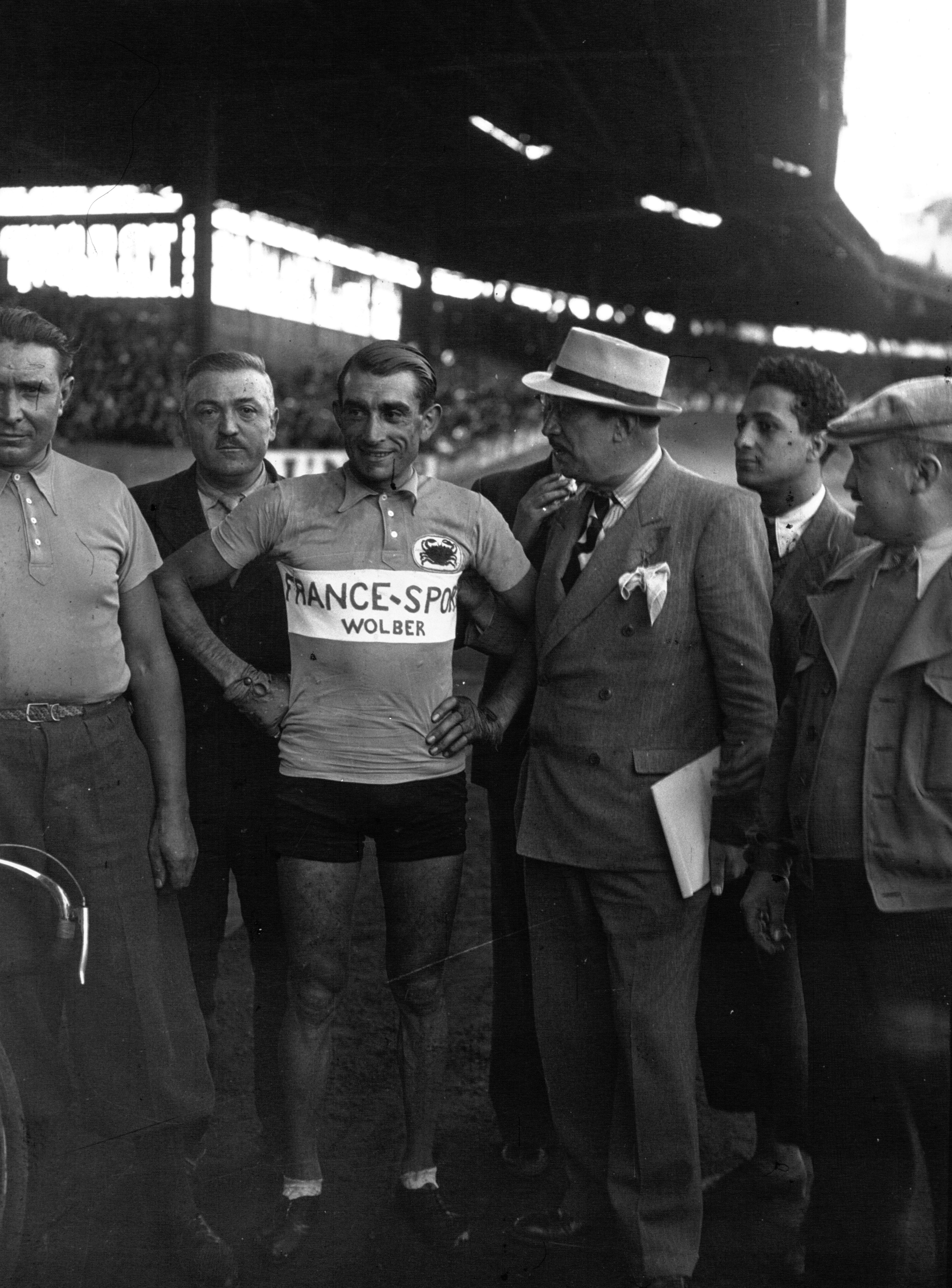
Magne at the 1935 Grand Prix des Nations

1927
Tour de France

6th overall
Stage 14 win

GP Wolber (as part of the Alleluia team)
1928
Tour de France

6th overall
Stage 13 and 21 wins

1929
Circuit des villes d'eaux d'Auvergne
Tour de France

7th overall

1930
Tour de France

3rd overall
Stage 12 win

Paris–Roubaix

3rd overall

Paris-Vichy
1931
Tour de France

1st overall
16 days in maillot jaune
Stage 9 win

1933
Tour de France

8th overall
2nd mountains classification

1934
Tour de France

1st overall
23 days in maillot jaune
Stage 17 and 21b wins

Grand Prix des Nations
1935
Grand Prix des Nations
1936
Tour de France

2nd overall
Stage 20b win

World Cycling Championship
Grand Prix des Nations
1938
Tour de France

8th overall
Stage 10c and 21 wins

=== Grand Tour results timeline ===
	1927	1928	1929	1930	1931	1932	1933	1934	1935	1936	1937	1938
Giro d'Italia	DNE	DNE	DNE	DNE	DNE	34	DNE	DNE	DNE	DNE	DNE	DNE
Stages won	—	—	—	—	—	0	—	—	—	—	—	—
Mountains classification	N/A	N/A	N/A	N/A	N/A	N/A	—	—	—	—	—	—
Tour de France	6	6	7	3	1	DNE	8	1	DNF-7	2	DNE	8
Stages won	1	2	0	1	1	—	0	2	0	1	—	2
Mountains classification	N/A	N/A	N/A	N/A	N/A	N/A	2	6	NR	5	NR	NR
Vuelta a España	N/A	N/A	N/A	N/A	N/A	N/A	N/A	N/A	DNE	DNE	N/A	N/A
Stages won	N/A	N/A	N/A	N/A	N/A	N/A	N/A	N/A	—	—	N/A	N/A
Mountains classification	N/A	N/A	N/A	N/A	N/A	N/A	N/A	N/A	—	—	N/A	N/A

Legend
1	Winner
2–3	Top three-finish
4–10	Top ten-finish
11–	Other finish
DNE	Did not enter
DNF-x	Did not finish (retired on stage x)
DNS-x	Did not start (not started on stage x)
HD-x	Finished outside time limit (occurred on stage x)
DSQ	Disqualified
N/A	Race/classification not held
NR	Not ranked in this classification
