= Adriano Vignoli =

Italian cyclist

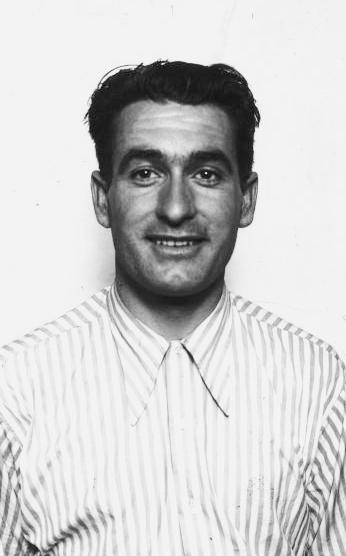

Personal information
- Full name: Adriano Vignoli
- Born: 11 December 1907 Sasso Marconi, Italy
- Died: 16 June 1996 (aged 88)

Cycling career
- Sport: Cycling
- Discipline: Road
- Role: Rider

Major wins
- One stage 1934 Tour de France; One stage 1934 Giro d'Italia

Adriano Vignoli (11 December 1907 – 16 June 1996) was an Italian professional road bicycle racer.

He was born in Sasso Marconi. In 1934, Vignoli won one stage both in the 1934 Tour de France and in the 1934 Giro d'Italia.

== Major results ==
1931
Giro del Piave
1934
Tour de France:

Winner stage 16

Giro d'Italia:

Winner stage 7
8th place overall classification

1937
Giro d'Italia:

10th place overall classification
