= Edoardo Molinar =

Italian cyclist

Personal information
- Full name: Edoardo Molinar
- Born: 31 August 1907 Rocca Canavese, Italy
- Died: 22 September 1994 (aged 87) Rocca Canavese, Italy

Cycling career
- Sport: Cycling
- Discipline: Road
- Role: Rider
- Rider type: Climbing specialist

Major wins
- Puy-de-Dôme (1934); Mont Coudon (1937, 1938)

Edoardo Molinar (31 August 1907 in Rocca Canavese, Italy – 22 September 1994 in Rocca Canavese, Italy) was an Italian cyclist.

He was a professional cyclist in 1931–1948 (1950), except for Second World War's years.

He was a winner of Puy-de-Dôme (1934) and 13th stage of 1935 Vuelta a España, the 1st edition of this competition. Also he was a King of the Mountains and 4th in General classification of 1935 Vuelta.

Edoardo Molinar took part in Tour de France (1934, 1938) and Giro d'Italia (1936, 1937).
