= Giovanni Gotti =

Italian cyclist

Personal information
- Born: 30 August 1912 Sedrina, Italy
- Died: 7 April 1988 (aged 75)

Cycling career
- Sport: Cycling
- Role: Rider

Giovanni Gotti (30 August 1912 – 7 April 1988) was an Italian racing cyclist. He won stage 3 of the 1938 Giro d'Italia.
