= Giovanni Cazzulani =

Italian cyclist

Personal information
- Born: 5 August 1909 Pandino, Italy
- Died: 22 October 1983 (aged 74) Varzi, Italy

Cycling career
- Sport: Cycling

Giovanni Cazzulani (5 August 1909 – 22 October 1983) was an Italian cyclist. He competed in the individual road race event at the 1932 Summer Olympics. He finished in third place in the 1934 Giro d'Italia.
