= Eugenio Gestri =

Italian cyclist

Personal information
- Full name: Eugenio Gestri
- Born: 27 October 1905 Prato, Italy
- Died: 2 September 1944 (aged 38) Prato, Italy

Cycling career
- Sport: Cycling
- Discipline: Road
- Role: Rider

Major wins
- One stage Tour de France
Medal record
Men's road bicycle racing
Representing Italy
World Championships
Silver medal – second place	1930 Liège	Amateur's Road Race

Eugenio Gestri (27 October 1905 – 2 September 1944) was an Italian professional road bicycle racer. He was born at Prato, where he also died.

In 1931, Gestri won the 14th stage of the 1931 Tour de France.

== Major results ==
1930
Coppa Bernocchi
1931
Predappio – Roma
Tour de France:

Winner stage 14

1934
Giro delle Due Province Messina
