= List of teams and cyclists in the 1932 Tour de France =

List of cyclists

In the 1932 Tour de France, for the third year, the race was run in the national team format, with five different teams. Belgium, Italy, Switzerland and France each sent a team with eight cyclists, while Germany and Austria sent a combined team, with seven German cyclists and one Austrian cyclist. In addition, 40 cyclists joined as touriste-routiers.

Charles Pélissier, who had won 13 stages in the 1930 and 1931 Tours, and Antonin Magne, the winner of 1931, were absent from the French team. Still, there were so many good French cyclists in that time that the French team was still considered superior.

The Italian team included three Giro d'Italia winners: the winner from the 1930 Giro d'Italia, Luigi Marchisio; the winner from the 1931 Giro d'Italia, Francesco Camusso and the winner from the 1932 Giro d'Italia, Antonio Pesenti.

The Belgium team had Jef Demuysere, who had fought for the victory in the previous Tour until the end and had become second, and two-time world champion Georges Ronsse.

== By rider ==
Legend
| No. | Starting number worn by the rider during the Tour |
| Pos. | Position in the general classification |
| DNF | Denotes a rider who did not finish |

| No. | Name | Nationality | Team | Pos. | Ref |
|---|---|---|---|---|---|
| 1 | Jef Demuysere | Belgium | Belgium | 8 | |
| 2 | Alphonse Schepers | Belgium | Belgium | DNF | |
| 3 | Georges Ronsse | Belgium | Belgium | 5 | |
| 4 | Georges Lemaire | Belgium | Belgium | 15 | |
| 5 | Gérard Loncke | Belgium | Belgium | 34 | |
| 6 | Jean Aerts | Belgium | Belgium | 13 | |
| 7 | Frans Bonduel | Belgium | Belgium | 6 | |
| 8 | Gaston Rebry | Belgium | Belgium | 20 | |
| 9 | Raffaele di Paco | Italy | Italy | 33 | |
| 10 | Antonio Pesenti | Italy | Italy | 4 | |
| 11 | Aldo Canazza | Italy | Italy | DNF | |
| 12 | Ambrogio Morelli | Italy | Italy | DNF | |
| 13 | Eugenio Gestri | Italy | Italy | DNF | |
| 14 | Francesco Camusso | Italy | Italy | 3 | |
| 15 | Michele Orecchia | Italy | Italy | 14 | |
| 16 | Luigi Marchisio | Italy | Italy | 26 | |
| 17 | Albert Büchi | Switzerland | Switzerland | 11 | |
| 18 | Ernst Hofer | Switzerland | Switzerland | DNF | |
| 19 | Alfred Bula | Switzerland | Switzerland | 41 | |
| 20 | August Erne | Switzerland | Switzerland | 55 | |
| 21 | Türel Wanzenried | Switzerland | Switzerland | DNF | |
| 22 | Alfred Büchi | Switzerland | Switzerland | 36 | |
| 23 | Roger Pipoz | Switzerland | Switzerland | DNF | |
| 24 | Georges Antenen | Switzerland | Switzerland | 29 | |
| 25 | Willy Kutschbach | Germany | Germany/Austria | DNF | |
| 26 | Georg Umbenhauer | Germany | Germany/Austria | 56 | |
| 27 | Max Bulla | Austria | Germany/Austria | 19 | |
| 28 | Oskar Thierbach | Germany | Germany/Austria | 7 | |
| 29 | Herbert Sieronski | Germany | Germany/Austria | 39 | |
| 30 | Ludwig Geyer | Germany | Germany/Austria | 22 | |
| 31 | Kurt Stoepel | Germany | Germany/Austria | 2 | |
| 32 | Rudolph Risch | Germany | Germany/Austria | 57 | |
| 33 | André Leducq | France | France | 1 | |
| 34 | Albert Barthélémy | France | France | 49 | |
| 35 | Julien Moineau | France | France | 25 | |
| 36 | Louis Peglion | France | France | 47 | |
| 37 | Marcel Bidot | France | France | 30 | |
| 38 | Maurice Archambaud | France | France | 16 | |
| 39 | Georges Speicher | France | France | 10 | |
| 40 | Roger Lapébie | France | France | 23 | |
| 101 | Paul Le Drogo | France | Touriste-routier | DNF | |
| 102 | Benoît Faure | France | Touriste-routier | 12 | |
| 103 | Joseph Mauclair | France | Touriste-routier | DNF | |
| 104 | Ernest Neuhard | France | Touriste-routier | 28 | |
| 105 | Auguste Pitte | France | Touriste-routier | DNF | |
| 106 | Yves Le Goff | France | Touriste-routier | DNF | |
| 107 | Fernand Fayolle | France | Touriste-routier | 35 | |
| 108 | Adrien Buttafocchi | France | Touriste-routier | DNF | |
| 109 | Marius Guiramand | France | Touriste-routier | 31 | |
| 110 | René Bernard | France | Touriste-routier | 18 | |
| 111 | François Haas | France | Touriste-routier | 51 | |
| 112 | Lazare Venot | France | Touriste-routier | 37 | |
| 113 | Léon Fichot | France | Touriste-routier | DNF | |
| 114 | Robert Brugere | France | Touriste-routier | 52 | |
| 115 | Marcel Mazeyrat | France | Touriste-routier | 24 | |
| 116 | Jules Puy | France | Touriste-routier | DNF | |
| 117 | François Moreels | Belgium | Touriste-routier | 44 | |
| 118 | Jean Gouleme | France | Touriste-routier | 46 | |
| 119 | Jules Buysse | Belgium | Touriste-routier | 40 | |
| 120 | Jean Wauters | Belgium | Touriste-routier | 17 | |
| 121 | Jean Naert | Belgium | Touriste-routier | DNF | |
| 122 | Emile Decroix | Belgium | Touriste-routier | 43 | |
| 123 | Frans Alexander | Belgium | Touriste-routier | DNF | |
| 124 | Félicien Vervaecke | Belgium | Touriste-routier | DNF | |
| 125 | Joseph Horemans | Belgium | Touriste-routier | DNF | |
| 126 | Augusto Zanzi | Italy | Touriste-routier | 21 | |
| 127 | Amerigo Cacioni | Italy | Touriste-routier | DNF | |
| 128 | Luigi Barral | Italy | Touriste-routier | 9 | |
| 129 | Amulio Viarengo | Italy | Touriste-routier | 38 | |
| 130 | Giuseppe Pancera | Italy | Touriste-routier | 32 | |
| 131 | Alessandro Catalani | Italy | Touriste-routier | DNF | |
| 132 | Aleardo Simoni | Italy | Touriste-routier | 42 | |
| 133 | Francis Bouillet | France | Touriste-routier | 53 | |
| 134 | Nicolas Frantz | Luxembourg | Touriste-routier | 45 | |
| 135 | Jean-Pierre Muller | Luxembourg | Touriste-routier | 50 | |
| 136 | Fernand Cornez | France | Touriste-routier | 54 | |
| 137 | Vicente Trueba | Spain | Touriste-routier | 27 | |
| 138 | Hermann Müller | Germany | Touriste-routier | DNF | |
| 139 | Karl Altenburger | Germany | Touriste-routier | 48 | |
| 140 | Karl Olböter | Germany | Touriste-routier | DNF | |
