= List of teams and cyclists in the 1932 Giro d'Italia =

The 1932 Giro d'Italia was the 20th edition of the Giro d'Italia, one of cycling's Grand Tours. The field consisted of 109 riders, and 66 riders finished the race.

== By rider ==
Legend
No.	Starting number worn by the rider during the Giro
Pos.	Position in the general classification
DNF	Denotes a rider who did not finish

No.	Name	Nationality	Team	Ref
1	Learco Guerra	Italy	Maino–Clément	
2	Luigi Giacobbe	Italy	Maino–Clément	
3	Antonio Negrini	Italy	Maino–Clément	
4	Pio Ciammi	Italy	Individual	
5	Angelo Rinaldi	Italy	Maino–Clément	
6	Vasco Bergamaschi	Italy	Maino–Clément	
7	Antonin Magne	France	France Sport	
8	Pierre Magne	France	France Sport	
9	Julien Moineau	France	France Sport	
10	Jules Merviel	France	France Sport	
11	André Godinat	France	France Sport	
12	Raymond Louviot	France	France Sport	
13	Jef Demuysere	Belgium	Ganna–Dunlop	
14	Julien Vervaecke	Belgium	Ganna–Dunlop	
15	Joseph Dervaes	Belgium	Individual	
16	Emile Decroix	Belgium	Ganna–Dunlop	
17	Theo Heimann	Switzerland	Colin	
18	Walter Blattmann	Switzerland	Colin	
19	Henri Wullschleger	Switzerland	Colin	
20	Luigi Luisoni	Switzerland	Colin	
21	Oskar Thierbach	Germany	Atala	
22	Ludwig Geyer	Germany	Atala	
23	Hermann Buse	Germany	Atala	
24	Kurt Stöpel	Germany	Atala	
25	Francesco Camusso	Italy	Gloria–Hutchinson	
26	Domenico Piemontesi	Italy	Gloria–Hutchinson	
27	Fabio Battesini	Italy	Gloria–Hutchinson	
28	Michele Orecchia	Italy	Gloria–Hutchinson	
29	Giovanni Firpo	Italy	Gloria–Hutchinson	
30	Costante Girardengo	Italy	Maino–Clément	
31	Michele Mara	Italy	Bianchi	
32	Alfredo Bovet	Italy	Bianchi	
33	Luigi Marchisio	Italy	Bianchi	
34	Allegro Grandi	Italy	Bianchi	
35	Eugenio Gestri	Italy	Bianchi	
36	Ambrogio Morelli	Italy	Bianchi	
37	Aurelio Menegazzi	Italy	Atala	
38	Alfredo Binda	Italy	Legnano–Hutchinson	
39	Remo Bertoni	Italy	Legnano–Hutchinson	
40	Felice Gremo	Italy	Legnano–Hutchinson	
41	Albino Binda	Italy	Legnano–Hutchinson	
42	Raffaele di Paco	Italy	Wolsit–Hutchinson	
43	Antonio Pesenti	Italy	Wolsit–Hutchinson	
44	Aldo Canazza	Italy	Wolsit–Hutchinson	
45	Mario Cipriani	Italy	Ganna–Dunlop	
46	Ettore Meini	Italy	Ganna–Dunlop	
47	Leonida Frascarelli	Italy	Individual	
48	Gaetano Belloni	Italy	Olympia	
49	Luigi Barral	Italy	Olympia	
50	Renato Scorticati	Italy	Olympia	
71	Augusto Zanzi	Italy	Individual	
72	Antonio Folco	Italy	Individual	
73	Felice Lessona	Italy	Individual	
74	Francesco Ricco	Italy	Individual	
75	Angelo Lavazza	Italy	Individual	
76	Pietro Mori	Italy	Individual	
77	Aristide Cavallini	Italy	Individual	
78	Amilcare Galloni	Italy	Individual	
79	Giovanni Vitali	Italy	Individual	
80	Giovanni Bianchini	Italy	Individual	
81	Umberto Magni	Italy	Individual	
82	Giulio Fatticcioni	Italy	Individual	
83	Marco Giuntelli	Italy	Individual	
84	Gennaro Improta	Italy	Individual	
85	Raffaele Perna	Italy	Individual	
86	Mario Reina	Italy	Individual	
87	Melandro Parati	Italy	Individual	
88	Angelo Lalle	Italy	Individual	
89	Armando Gori	Italy	Individual	
90	Angelo Giannini	Italy	Individual	
91	Giovanni Del Conte	Italy	Individual	
92	Carlo Moretti	Italy	Individual	
93	Emilio Codazza	Italy	Individual	
94	Alfredo Carniselli	Italy	Individual	
95	Oreste Cignoli	Italy	Individual	
96	Domenico Puleo	Italy	Individual	
97	Nicola Ranieri	Italy	Individual	
98	Giuseppe Valente	Italy	Individual	
99	Nicolo Mammina	Italy	Individual	
100	Pietro Fossati	Italy	Individual	
101	Siro Magagnini	Italy	Individual	
102	Ettore Balmamion	Italy	Individual	
103	Carlo Rovida	Italy	Individual	
104	Decimo Dell'Arsina	Italy	Individual	
105	Perioli	Italy	Individual	
106	Natale Nobile	Italy	Individual	
107	Armando Jori	Italy	Individual	
108	Antonio Liguori	Italy	Individual	
109	Edoardo Molinar	Italy	Individual	
110	Luigi Bianchi	Italy	Individual	
111	Camilo Erba	Italy	Individual	
112	Battista Scimia	Italy	Individual	
113	Amerigo Cacioni	Italy	Individual	
114	Virgilio Zuffi	Italy	Individual	
115	Aldo Bonacina	Italy	Individual	
116	Tullio Vincenzi	Italy	Individual	
117	Paride Scacchetti	Italy	Individual	
118	Mario Semprini	Italy	Individual	
119	Mario Praderio	Italy	Individual	
120	Giovanni Gerbi	Italy	Individual	
121	Agostino Bellandi	Italy	Individual	
122	Aleardo Simoni	Italy	Individual	
123	Armando Zucchini	Italy	Individual	
124	Guglielmo Marin	Italy	Individual	
125	Michele Piretta	Italy	Individual	
126	Eraldo Fornari	Italy	Individual	
128	Domenico Uccheddu	Italy	Individual	
129	Francesco Bonino	Italy	Individual	
130	Luigi Tramontini	Italy	Individual	
131	Silvio Montessoro	Italy	Individual	
132	Giacomo Fassio	Italy	Individual	
