= List of teams and cyclists in the 1933 Giro d'Italia =

The 1933 Giro d'Italia was the 21st edition of the Giro d'Italia, one of cycling's Grand Tours. The field consisted of 97 riders, and 51 riders finished the race.

== By rider ==
Legend
No.	Starting number worn by the rider during the Giro
Pos.	Position in the general classification
DNF	Denotes a rider who did not finish

No.	Name	Nationality	Team	Ref
1	Francesco Camusso	Italy	Gloria	
2	Domenico Piemontesi	Italy	Gloria	
4	Giovanni Firpo	Italy	Gloria	
5	Carlo Rovida	Italy	Gloria	
6	Bernardo Rogora	Italy	Gloria	
7	Ettore Meini	Italy	Ganna	
8	Mario Cipriani	Italy	Ganna	
9	Agostino Bellandi	Italy	Ganna	
10	Jef Demuysere	Belgium	Ganna	
11	Gaston Rebry	Belgium	Ganna	
12	Gérard Loncke	Belgium	Ganna	
13	Antoine Dignef	Belgium	Ganna	
14	Jozef Moerenhout	Belgium	Ganna	
15	Michele Mara	Italy	Bianchi	
16	Remo Bertoni	Italy	Bianchi	
17	Alfredo Bovet	Italy	Bianchi	
18	Giuseppe Olmo	Italy	Bianchi	
19	Ambrogio Morelli	Italy	Bianchi	
20	Pietro Rimoldi	Italy	Bianchi	
21	Augusto Zanzi	Italy	Bianchi	
22	Learco Guerra	Italy	Maino–Clément	
23	Luigi Giacobbe	Italy	Maino–Clément	
24	Fabio Battesini	Italy	Maino–Clément	
25	Angelo Rinaldi	Italy	Maino–Clément	
26	Amerigo Cacioni	Italy	Maino–Clément	
27	Luigi Marchisio	Italy	Olympia	
28	Luigi Barral	Italy	Olympia	
29	Pio Ciammi	Italy	Olympia	
30	Nino Sella	Italy	Olympia	
31	Hermann Buse	Germany	Olympia	
32	Karl Altenburger	Germany	Olympia	
33	Marcel Bidot	France	Olympia	
34	Joseph Mauclair	France	Olympia	
35	Fernand Cornez	France	Dei	
36	Benoît Faure	France	Dei	
37	Antonio Pesenti	Italy	Dei	
38	Felice Gremo	Italy	Dei	
39	Allegro Grandi	Italy	Dei	
40	Carlo Moretti	Italy	Dei	
41	Mariano Cañardo	Spain	Bestetti	
42	Vicente Trueba	Spain	Bestetti	
43	Isidro Figueras	Spain	Bestetti	
44	René Vietto	France	Olympia	
45	Giuseppe Graglia	Italy	Dei	
46	Costante Girardengo	Italy	Maino–Clément	
47	Alfredo Binda	Italy	Legnano–Clément	
48	Kurt Stöpel	Germany	Legnano–Clément	
49	Ludwig Geyer	Germany	Legnano–Clément	
50	Albino Binda	Italy	Legnano–Clément	
51	Aldo Canazza	Italy	Legnano–Clément	
52	Luigi Macchi	Italy	Legnano–Clément	
61	Maggiorino Grosso	Italy	Individual	
62	Giovanni Morisio	Italy	Individual	
63	Antonio Fraccaroli	Italy	Individual	
64	Nicolo Mammina	Italy	Individual	
65	Natale Nobile	Italy	Individual	
66	Armando Zucchini	Italy	Individual	
67	Aristide Cavallini	Italy	Individual	
68	Francesco Bonino	Italy	Individual	
69	Marco Giuntelli	Italy	Individual	
70	Antonio Folco	Italy	Individual	
71	Decimo Dell'Arsina	Italy	Individual	
72	Giuseppe Martano	Italy	Individual	
73	Pietro Fossati	Italy	Individual	
74	Giuseppe Pancera	Italy	Individual	
75	Camilo Erba	Italy	Individual	
76	Mario Praderio	Italy	Individual	
77	Angelo Lalle	Italy	Individual	
78	Vasco Bergamaschi	Italy	Maino–Clément	
79	Paride Scacchetti	Italy	Individual	
80	Aleardo Simoni	Italy	Individual	
81	Guglielmo Segato	Italy	Individual	
82	Antonio Andretta	Italy	Individual	
83	Giovanni Vitali	Italy	Individual	
84	Umberto Magni	Italy	Individual	
85	Armando Jori	Italy	Individual	
86	Ettore Balmamion	Italy	Individual	
87	Luigi Tramontini	Italy	Individual	
88	Orlando Teani	Italy	Individual	
89	Faliero Masi	Italy	Individual	
90	Eugenio Gestri	Italy	Individual	
91	Renato Scorticati	Italy	Individual	
92	Giovanni Cazzulani	Italy	Individual	
93	Cesare Facciani	Italy	Individual	
94	Carlo Romanatti	Italy	Individual	
95	Carlo Oria	Italy	Individual	
96	Battista Astrua	Italy	Individual	
97	Enrico Eboli	Italy	Individual	
98	Secondo Tortolini	Italy	Individual	
99	Melandro Parati	Italy	Individual	
100	Lino Carlotti	Italy	Individual	
101	Virgilio Zuffi	Italy	Individual	
102	Michele Curtotti	Italy	Individual	
103	Antonio Cerioni	Italy	Individual	
104	Guglielmo Marin	Italy	Individual	
105	Mario Lavazza	Italy	Individual	
106	Dario Pagliazzi	Italy	Individual	
107	Armando Iori	Italy	Individual	
