= 1932 Tour de France, Stage 1 to Stage 11 =

Cycling race stages

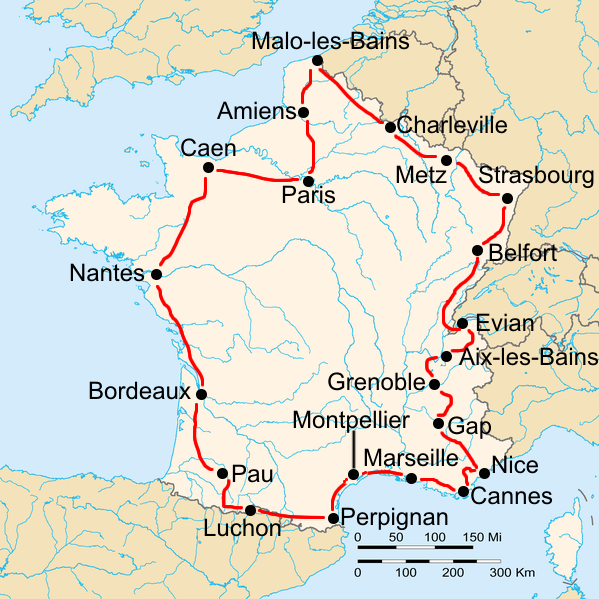
Route of the 1932 Tour de France

The 1932 Tour de France was the 26th edition of the Tour de France, one of cycling's Grand Tours. The Tour began in Paris with a flat stage on 6 July, and Stage 11 occurred on 21 July with a mountainous stage to Gap. The race finished in Paris on 31 July.

== Stage 1 ==
6 July 1932 - Paris to Caen, 208 km (129 mi)

Stage 1 result and general classification after stage 1

Rank	Rider	Team	Time
1	Jean Aerts (BEL)	Belgium	6h 06' 14"
2	Jef Demuysere (BEL)	Belgium	s.t.
3	Herbert Sieronski (GER)	Germany/Austria	+ 14"
4	Georges Speicher (FRA)	France	+ 25"
5	Alphonse Schepers (BEL)	Belgium	+ 2' 13"
6	Georges Lemaire (BEL)	Belgium	s.t.
7	Gérard Loncke (BEL)	Belgium	+ 3' 18"
8	Karl Altenburger (GER)	Touriste-routier	+ 4' 12"
9	Frans Alexander (BEL)	Touriste-routier	s.t.
10	Raffaele di Paco (ITA)	Italy	s.t.

== Stage 2 ==
7 July 1932 - Caen to Nantes, 300 km (190 mi)

Stage 2 result

Rank	Rider	Team	Time
1	Kurt Stoepel (GER)	Germany/Austria	9h 51' 34"
2	Frans Bonduel (BEL)	Belgium	s.t.
3	André Leducq (FRA)	France	s.t.
4	Joseph Mauclair (FRA)	Touriste-routier	s.t.
5	Oskar Thierbach (GER)	Germany/Austria	s.t.
6	Maurice Archambaud (FRA)	France	s.t.
7	Jean Wauters (BEL)	Touriste-routier	s.t.
8	Georges Lemaire (BEL)	Belgium	s.t.
9	Rudolph Risch (GER)	Germany/Austria	s.t.
10	Julien Moineau (FRA)	France	s.t.

General classification after stage 2

Rank	Rider	Team	Time
1	Kurt Stoepel (GER)	Germany/Austria	
2	Frans Bonduel (BEL)	Belgium	+ 2' 00"
3	Georges Lemaire (BEL)	Belgium	+ 3' 00"
4			
5			
6			
7			
8			
9			
10			

== Stage 3 ==
9 July 1932 - Nantes to Bordeaux, 387 km (240 mi)

Stage 3 result

Rank	Rider	Team	Time
1	André Leducq (FRA)	France	12h 54' 33"
2	Raffaele di Paco (ITA)	Italy	s.t.
3	Frans Bonduel (BEL)	Belgium	s.t.
4	Fernand Cornez (FRA)	Touriste-routier	s.t.
=5	Jef Demuysere (BEL)	Belgium	s.t.
=5	Georges Ronsse (BEL)	Belgium	s.t.
=5	Georges Lemaire (BEL)	Belgium	s.t.
=5	Jean Aerts (BEL)	Belgium	s.t.
=5	Gaston Rebry (BEL)	Belgium	s.t.
=5	Antonio Pesenti (ITA)	Italy	s.t.

General classification after stage 3

Rank	Rider	Team	Time
1	André Leducq (FRA)	France	
2	Kurt Stoepel (GER)	Germany/Austria	+ 1' 45"
3	Frans Bonduel (BEL)	Belgium	+ 2' 00"
4			
5			
6			
7			
8			
9			
10			

== Stage 4 ==
11 July 1932 - Bordeaux to Pau, 206 km (128 mi)

Stage 4 result

Rank	Rider	Team	Time
1	Georges Ronsse (BEL)	Belgium	6h 23' 20"
2	Paul Le Drogo (FRA)	Touriste-routier	s.t.
3	Georges Antenen (SUI)	Switzerland	+ 1' 09"
4	Frans Bonduel (BEL)	Belgium	s.t.
5	André Leducq (FRA)	France	s.t.
6	Jean Aerts (BEL)	Belgium	s.t.
7	Luigi Marchisio (ITA)	Italy	s.t.
8	Alphonse Schepers (BEL)	Belgium	s.t.
9	Luigi Barral (ITA)	Touriste-routier	s.t.
10	Robert Brugere (FRA)	Touriste-routier	s.t.

General classification after stage 4

Rank	Rider	Team	Time
1	André Leducq (FRA)	France	
2	Kurt Stoepel (GER)	Germany/Austria	+ 1' 45"
3	Frans Bonduel (BEL)	Belgium	+ 2' 00"
4			
5			
6			
7			
8			
9			
10			

== Stage 5 ==
12 July 1932 - Pau to Luchon, 229 km (142 mi)

Stage 5 result

Rank	Rider	Team	Time
1	Antonio Pesenti (ITA)	Italy	9h 00' 33"
2	Benoît Faure (FRA)	Touriste-routier	s.t.
3	Francesco Camusso (ITA)	Italy	+ 5"
4	Eugenio Gestri (ITA)	Italy	+ 3' 14"
5	Maurice Archambaud (FRA)	France	+ 3' 53"
6	André Leducq (FRA)	France	s.t.
7	Jean Aerts (BEL)	Belgium	s.t.
8	Kurt Stoepel (GER)	Germany/Austria	+ 4' 03"
9	Marcel Bidot (FRA)	France	+ 6' 51"
10	Jean Naert (BEL)	Touriste-routier	+ 12' 39"

General classification after stage 5

Rank	Rider	Team	Time
1	André Leducq (FRA)	France	
2	Kurt Stoepel (GER)	Germany/Austria	+ 1' 55"
3	Jean Aerts (BEL)	Belgium	+ 6' 27"
4			
5			
6			
7			
8			
9			
10			

== Stage 6 ==
14 July 1932 - Luchon to Perpignan, 322 km (200 mi)

Stage 6 result

Rank	Rider	Team	Time
1	Frans Bonduel (BEL)	Belgium	11h 50' 31"
2	André Leducq (FRA)	France	s.t.
3	Kurt Stoepel (GER)	Germany/Austria	s.t.
4	Alphonse Schepers (BEL)	Belgium	s.t.
5	Benoît Faure (FRA)	Touriste-routier	s.t.
=6	Jef Demuysere (BEL)	Belgium	s.t.
=6	Georges Ronsse (BEL)	Belgium	s.t.
=6	Ambrogio Morelli (ITA)	Italy	s.t.
=6	Francesco Camusso (ITA)	Italy	s.t.
=6	Luigi Marchisio (ITA)	Italy	s.t.

General classification after stage 6

Rank	Rider	Team	Time
1	André Leducq (FRA)	France	
2	Kurt Stoepel (GER)	Germany/Austria	+ 2' 55"
3	Antonio Pesenti (ITA)	Italy	+ 8' 46"
4			
5			
6			
7			
8			
9			
10			

== Stage 7 ==
16 July 1932 - Perpignan to Montpellier, 168 km (104 mi)

Stage 7 result

Rank	Rider	Team	Time
1	Frans Bonduel (BEL)	Belgium	5h 33' 17"
2	André Leducq (FRA)	France	s.t.
3	Raffaele di Paco (ITA)	Italy	s.t.
4	Georges Ronsse (BEL)	Belgium	s.t.
5	Fernand Cornez (FRA)	Touriste-routier	s.t.
6	Georges Antenen (SUI)	Switzerland	s.t.
=7	Jef Demuysere (BEL)	Belgium	s.t.
=7	Alphonse Schepers (BEL)	Belgium	s.t.
=7	Georges Lemaire (BEL)	Belgium	s.t.
=7	Gérard Loncke (BEL)	Belgium	s.t.

General classification after stage 7

Rank	Rider	Team	Time
1	André Leducq (FRA)	France	
2	Kurt Stoepel (GER)	Germany/Austria	+ 4' 55"
3	Antonio Pesenti (ITA)	Italy	+ 10' 46"
4			
5			
6			
7			
8			
9			
10			

== Stage 8 ==
17 July 1932 - Montpellier to Marseille, 206 km (128 mi)

Stage 8 result

Rank	Rider	Team	Time
1	Michele Orecchia (ITA)	Italy	6h 31' 10"
2	Adrien Buttafocchi (FRA)	Touriste-routier	s.t.
3	André Leducq (FRA)	France	+ 1' 40"
4	Georges Ronsse (BEL)	Belgium	s.t.
5	Kurt Stoepel (GER)	Germany/Austria	s.t.
6	Ambrogio Morelli (ITA)	Italy	s.t.
7	Jean Wauters (BEL)	Touriste-routier	s.t.
8	Alphonse Schepers (BEL)	Belgium	s.t.
9	Oskar Thierbach (GER)	Germany/Austria	s.t.
10	Albert Büchi (SUI)	Switzerland	s.t.

General classification after stage 8

Rank	Rider	Team	Time
1	André Leducq (FRA)	France	
2	Kurt Stoepel (GER)	Germany/Austria	+ 6' 05"
3	Antonio Pesenti (ITA)	Italy	+ 14' 34"
4			
5			
6			
7			
8			
9			
10			

== Stage 9 ==
18 July 1932 - Marseille to Cannes, 191 km (119 mi)

Stage 9 result

Rank	Rider	Team	Time
1	Raffaele di Paco (ITA)	Italy	6h 29' 31"
2	Georges Ronsse (BEL)	Belgium	s.t.
3	Georges Antenen (SUI)	Switzerland	+ 36"
4	André Leducq (FRA)	France	s.t.
5	Amulio Viarengo (ITA)	Touriste-routier	s.t.
6	Kurt Stoepel (GER)	Germany/Austria	s.t.
7	René Bernard (FRA)	Touriste-routier	s.t.
8	Frans Bonduel (BEL)	Belgium	s.t.
=9	Jean Aerts (BEL)	Belgium	s.t.
=9	Jef Demuysere (BEL)	Belgium	s.t.

General classification after stage 9

Rank	Rider	Team	Time
1	André Leducq (FRA)	France	
2	Kurt Stoepel (GER)	Germany/Austria	+ 6' 05"
3	Antonio Pesenti (ITA)	Italy	+ 14' 34"
4			
5			
6			
7			
8			
9			
10			

== Stage 10 ==
19 July 1932 - Cannes to Nice, 132 km (82 mi)

Stage 10 result

Rank	Rider	Team	Time
1	Francesco Camusso (ITA)	Italy	4h 36' 40"
2	Luigi Barral (ITA)	Touriste-routier	+ 1' 18"
3	Luigi Marchisio (ITA)	Italy	+ 1' 20"
4	Kurt Stoepel (GER)	Germany/Austria	+ 2' 38"
5	Vicente Trueba (ESP)	Touriste-routier	s.t.
6	Oskar Thierbach (GER)	Germany/Austria	s.t.
7	Augusto Zanzi (ITA)	Touriste-routier	+ 3' 39"
8	Antonio Pesenti (ITA)	Italy	+ 4' 01"
9	Max Bulla (AUT)	Germany/Austria	s.t.
10	Ambrogio Morelli (ITA)	Italy	s.t.

General classification after stage 10

Rank	Rider	Team	Time
1	André Leducq (FRA)	France	
2	Kurt Stoepel (GER)	Germany/Austria	+ 3' 13"
3	Francesco Camusso (ITA)	Italy	+ 5' 21"
4			
5			
6			
7			
8			
9			
10			

== Stage 11 ==
21 July 1932 - Nice to Gap, 233 km (145 mi)

Stage 11 result

Rank	Rider	Team	Time
1	André Leducq (FRA)	France	8h 41' 33"
2	Frans Bonduel (BEL)	Belgium	s.t.
3	Benoît Faure (FRA)	Touriste-routier	s.t.
4	Amulio Viarengo (ITA)	Touriste-routier	s.t.
=5	Georges Ronsse (BEL)	Belgium	s.t.
=5	Kurt Stoepel (GER)	Germany/Austria	s.t.
=5	Georges Lemaire (BEL)	Belgium	s.t.
=5	Antonio Pesenti (ITA)	Italy	s.t.
=5	Francesco Camusso (ITA)	Italy	s.t.
=5	Luigi Marchisio (ITA)	Italy	s.t.

General classification after stage 11

Rank	Rider	Team	Time
1	André Leducq (FRA)	France	
2	Kurt Stoepel (GER)	Germany/Austria	+ 7' 13"
3	Francesco Camusso (ITA)	Italy	+ 9' 21"
4			
5			
6			
7			
8			
9			
10			
