= 1932 Tour de France, Stage 12 to Stage 21 =

Cycling race stages

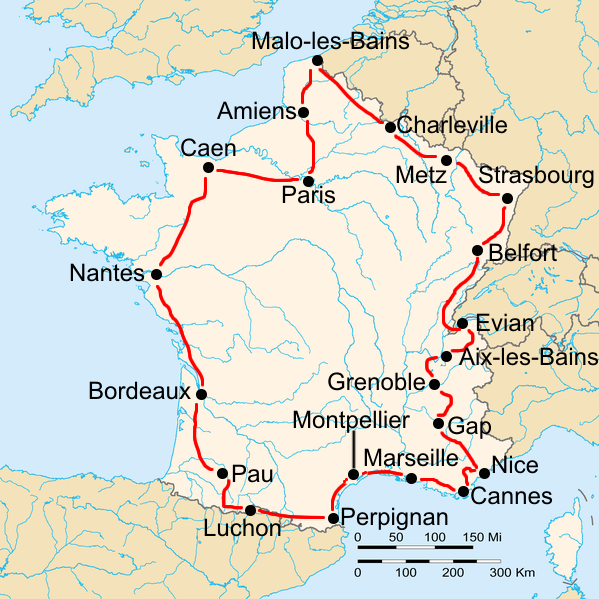
Route of the 1932 Tour de France

The 1932 Tour de France was the 26th edition of the Tour de France, one of cycling's Grand Tours. The Tour began in Paris with a flat stage on 6 July, and Stage 12 occurred on 22 July with a mountainous stage from Gap. The race finished in Paris on 31 July.

== Stage 12 ==
22 July 1932 - Gap to Grenoble, 102 km (63 mi)

Stage 12 result

Rank	Rider	Team	Time
1	Roger Lapébie (FRA)	France	3h 21' 52"
2	Georges Speicher (FRA)	France	s.t.
3	Frans Bonduel (BEL)	Belgium	s.t.
4	Kurt Stoepel (GER)	Germany/Austria	s.t.
5	Max Bulla (AUT)	Germany/Austria	s.t.
6	Karl Altenburger (GER)	Touriste-routier	s.t.
7	Georges Ronsse (BEL)	Belgium	s.t.
=8	Francesco Camusso (ITA)	Italy	s.t.
=8	Oskar Thierbach (GER)	Germany/Austria	s.t.
=8	Ludwig Geyer (GER)	Germany/Austria	s.t.

General classification after stage 12

Rank	Rider	Team	Time
1	André Leducq (FRA)	France	
2	Kurt Stoepel (GER)	Germany/Austria	+ 7' 13"
3	Francesco Camusso (ITA)	Italy	+ 9' 21"
4			
5			
6			
7			
8			
9			
10			

== Stage 13 ==
23 July 1932 - Grenoble to Aix-les-Bains, 230 km (140 mi)

Stage 13 result

Rank	Rider	Team	Time
1	André Leducq (FRA)	France	8h 11' 35"
2	Frans Bonduel (BEL)	Belgium	s.t.
3	Georges Ronsse (BEL)	Belgium	s.t.
4	Georges Speicher (FRA)	France	s.t.
5	Francesco Camusso (ITA)	Italy	s.t.
6	Luigi Barral (ITA)	Touriste-routier	+ 17"
7	Roger Lapébie (FRA)	France	+ 1' 50"
8	Max Bulla (AUT)	Germany/Austria	s.t.
9	Karl Altenburger (GER)	Touriste-routier	s.t.
10	Adrien Buttafocchi (FRA)	Touriste-routier	s.t.

General classification after stage 13

Rank	Rider	Team	Time
1	André Leducq (FRA)	France	
2	Kurt Stoepel (GER)	Germany/Austria	+ 13' 03"
3	Francesco Camusso (ITA)	Italy	+ 13' 21"
4			
5			
6			
7			
8			
9			
10			

== Stage 14 ==
24 July 1932 - Aix-les-Bains to Evian, 204 km (127 mi)

Stage 14 result

Rank	Rider	Team	Time
1	Raffaele di Paco (ITA)	Italy	7h 59' 25"
2	Georges Speicher (FRA)	France	s.t.
3	André Leducq (FRA)	France	s.t.
4	Ambrogio Morelli (ITA)	Italy	s.t.
5	Georges Antenen (SUI)	Switzerland	s.t.
6	Karl Altenburger (GER)	Touriste-routier	s.t.
7	Fernand Cornez (FRA)	Touriste-routier	s.t.
=8	Kurt Stoepel (GER)	Germany/Austria	s.t.
=8	Francesco Camusso (ITA)	Italy	s.t.
=8	Antonio Pesenti (ITA)	Italy	s.t.

General classification after stage 14

Rank	Rider	Team	Time
1	André Leducq (FRA)	France	
2	Kurt Stoepel (GER)	Germany/Austria	+ 14' 03"
3	Francesco Camusso (ITA)	Italy	+ 14' 21"
4			
5			
6			
7			
8			
9			
10			

== Stage 15 ==
25 July 1932 - Evian to Belfort, 291 km (181 mi)

Stage 15 result

Rank	Rider	Team	Time
1	André Leducq (FRA)	France	9h 56' 19"
2	Raffaele di Paco (ITA)	Italy	s.t.
3	Max Bulla (AUT)	Germany/Austria	s.t.
4	Frans Bonduel (BEL)	Belgium	s.t.
5	Georges Speicher (FRA)	France	s.t.
6	Luigi Marchisio (ITA)	Italy	s.t.
7	Francis Bouillet (FRA)	Touriste-routier	s.t.
8	Amulio Viarengo (ITA)	Touriste-routier	s.t.
=9	Jef Demuysere (BEL)	Belgium	s.t.
=9	Georges Ronsse (BEL)	Belgium	s.t.

General classification after stage 15

Rank	Rider	Team	Time
1	André Leducq (FRA)	France	
2	Kurt Stoepel (GER)	Germany/Austria	+ 18' 03"
3	Francesco Camusso (ITA)	Italy	+ 18' 21"
4			
5			
6			
7			
8			
9			
10			

== Stage 16 ==
26 July 1932 - Belfort to Strasbourg, 145 km (90 mi)

Stage 16 result

Rank	Rider	Team	Time
1	Gérard Loncke (BEL)	Belgium	4h 04' 30"
2	Georges Speicher (FRA)	France	s.t.
3	Frans Bonduel (BEL)	Belgium	s.t.
4	Fernand Cornez (FRA)	Touriste-routier	s.t.
5	Georges Ronsse (BEL)	Belgium	s.t.
6	Kurt Stoepel (GER)	Germany/Austria	s.t.
7	André Leducq (FRA)	France	s.t.
=8	Jef Demuysere (BEL)	Belgium	s.t.
=8	Georges Lemaire (BEL)	Belgium	s.t.
=8	Jean Aerts (BEL)	Belgium	s.t.

General classification after stage 16

Rank	Rider	Team	Time
1	André Leducq (FRA)	France	
2	Kurt Stoepel (GER)	Germany/Austria	+ 18' 03"
3	Francesco Camusso (ITA)	Italy	+ 18' 21"
4			
5			
6			
7			
8			
9			
10			

== Stage 17 ==
27 July 1932 - Strasbourg to Metz, 165 km (103 mi)

Stage 17 result

Rank	Rider	Team	Time
1	Raffaele di Paco (ITA)	Italy	5h 38' 35"
2	Gérard Loncke (BEL)	Belgium	s.t.
3	Georges Antenen (SUI)	Switzerland	s.t.
4	Roger Lapébie (FRA)	France	s.t.
5	Georges Speicher (FRA)	France	s.t.
6	Amulio Viarengo (ITA)	Touriste-routier	s.t.
7	Nicolas Frantz (LUX)	Touriste-routier	s.t.
=8	Jef Demuysere (BEL)	Belgium	s.t.
=8	Georges Ronsse (BEL)	Belgium	s.t.
=8	Georges Lemaire (BEL)	Belgium	s.t.

General classification after stage 17

Rank	Rider	Team	Time
1	André Leducq (FRA)	France	
2	Kurt Stoepel (GER)	Germany/Austria	+ 18' 03"
3	Francesco Camusso (ITA)	Italy	+ 18' 21"
4			
5			
6			
7			
8			
9			
10			

== Stage 18 ==
28 July 1932 - Metz to Charleville, 159 km (99 mi)

Stage 18 result

Rank	Rider	Team	Time
1	Raffaele di Paco (ITA)	Italy	5h 09' 48"
2	Gérard Loncke (BEL)	Belgium	s.t.
3	Kurt Stoepel (GER)	Germany/Austria	s.t.
4	Georges Speicher (FRA)	France	s.t.
5	Ambrogio Morelli (ITA)	Italy	s.t.
6	Georges Ronsse (BEL)	Belgium	s.t.
7	Jean Wauters (BEL)	Touriste-routier	s.t.
8	Albert Barthélémy (FRA)	France	s.t.
=9	Jef Demuysere (BEL)	Belgium	s.t.
=9	Georges Lemaire (BEL)	Belgium	s.t.

General classification after stage 18

Rank	Rider	Team	Time
1	André Leducq (FRA)	France	
2	Kurt Stoepel (GER)	Germany/Austria	+ 17' 03"
3	Francesco Camusso (ITA)	Italy	+ 18' 21"
4			
5			
6			
7			
8			
9			
10			

== Stage 19 ==
29 July 1932 - Charleville to Malo-les-Bains, 271 km (168 mi)

Stage 19 result

Rank	Rider	Team	Time
1	Gaston Rebry (BEL)	Belgium	8h 40' 15"
2	Jef Demuysere (BEL)	Belgium	+ 8' 52"
3	Raffaele di Paco (ITA)	Italy	+ 15' 07"
4	Georges Speicher (FRA)	France	s.t.
5	Fernand Cornez (FRA)	Touriste-routier	s.t.
6	Kurt Stoepel (GER)	Germany/Austria	s.t.
7	Frans Bonduel (BEL)	Belgium	s.t.
8	Ernest Neuhard (FRA)	Touriste-routier	s.t.
9	Luigi Marchisio (ITA)	Italy	s.t.
10	Giuseppe Pancera (ITA)	Touriste-routier	s.t.

General classification after stage 19

Rank	Rider	Team	Time
1	André Leducq (FRA)	France	
2	Kurt Stoepel (GER)	Germany/Austria	+ 17' 03"
3	Francesco Camusso (ITA)	Italy	+ 18' 21"
4			
5			
6			
7			
8			
9			
10			

== Stage 20 ==
30 July 1932 - Malo-les-Bains to Amiens, 212 km (132 mi)

Stage 20 result

Rank	Rider	Team	Time
1	André Leducq (FRA)	France	8h 16' 49"
2	Gérard Loncke (BEL)	Belgium	s.t.
3	Kurt Stoepel (GER)	Germany/Austria	s.t.
4	Francesco Camusso (ITA)	Italy	s.t.
5	Jef Demuysere (BEL)	Belgium	s.t.
6	René Bernard (FRA)	Touriste-routier	s.t.
7	Georges Ronsse (BEL)	Belgium	s.t.
8	Antonio Pesenti (ITA)	Italy	s.t.
9	Luigi Barral (ITA)	Touriste-routier	s.t.
10	Michele Orecchia (ITA)	Italy	s.t.

General classification after stage 20

Rank	Rider	Team	Time
1	André Leducq (FRA)	France	
2	Kurt Stoepel (GER)	Germany/Austria	+ 20' 03"
3	Francesco Camusso (ITA)	Italy	+ 22' 21"
4			
5			
6			
7			
8			
9			
10			

== Stage 21 ==
31 July 1932 - Amiens to Paris, 159 km (99 mi)

Stage 21 result

Rank	Rider	Team	Time
1	André Leducq (FRA)	France	4h 52' 38"
2	Georges Speicher (FRA)	France	s.t.
3	Georges Ronsse (BEL)	Belgium	s.t.
4	Roger Lapébie (FRA)	France	s.t.
5	Raffaele di Paco (ITA)	Italy	s.t.
6	Jean Wauters (BEL)	Touriste-routier	s.t.
7	Kurt Stoepel (GER)	Germany/Austria	s.t.
8	Albert Barthélémy (FRA)	France	s.t.
=9	Jef Demuysere (BEL)	Belgium	s.t.
=9	Georges Lemaire (BEL)	Belgium	s.t.

General classification after stage 21

Rank	Rider	Team	Time
1	André Leducq (FRA)	France	154h 11' 49"
2	Kurt Stoepel (GER)	Germany/Austria	+ 24' 03"
3	Francesco Camusso (ITA)	Italy	+ 26' 21"
4	Antonio Pesenti (ITA)	Italy	+ 37' 08"
5	Georges Ronsse (BEL)	Belgium	+ 41' 04"
6	Frans Bonduel (BEL)	Belgium	+ 45' 13"
7	Oskar Thierbach (GER)	Germany/Austria	+ 58' 44"
8	Jef Demuysere (BEL)	Belgium	+ 1h 03' 24"
9	Luigi Barral (ITA)	Touriste-routier	+ 1h 06' 57"
10	Georges Speicher (FRA)	France	+ 1h 08' 37"
