= 1931 Volta a Catalunya =

Race details
- Dates: 6–13 September 1931
- Stages: 7
- Distance: 1,440 km (894.8 mi)
- Winning time: 54h 48' 42"

Results
| | Winner | Salvador Cardona (ESP) |
| | Second | Mariano Cañardo (ESP) |
| | Third | Aleardo Simoni (ITA) |

The 1931 Volta a Catalunya was the 13th edition of the Volta a Catalunya cycle race and was held from 6 September to 13 September 1931. The race started and finished in Barcelona. The race was won by Salvador Cardona.

== Route and stages ==
List of stages
| Stage | Date | Course | Distance | Winner |
|---|---|---|---|---|
| 1 | 6 September | Barcelona to Reus | 174 km (108 mi) | Salvador Cardona (ESP) |
| 2 | 7 September | Reus to Alcañiz (Aragon) | 239 km (149 mi) | Mariano Cañardo (ESP) |
| 3 | 8 September | Alcañiz (Aragon) to Montblanc | 194 km (121 mi) | Salvador Cardona (ESP) |
| 4 | 9 September | Montblanc to Ripoll | 224 km (139 mi) | Mariano Cañardo (ESP) |
| | 10 September | Ripoll | | Rest day |
| 5 | 11 September | Ripoll to Terrassa | 242 km (150 mi) | Salvador Cardona (ESP) |
| 6 | 12 September | Terrassa to Manresa | 176 km (109 mi) | Ettore Balmamion (ITA) |
| 7 | 13 September | Manresa to Barcelona | 134 km (83 mi) | Vicente Cebrián (ESP) |
| | Total | | 1,383 km (859 mi) | |

== General classification ==
Final general classification

| Rank | Rider | Time |
|---|---|---|
| 1 | Salvador Cardona (ESP) | 54h 48' 42" |
| 2 | Mariano Cañardo (ESP) | + 4' 45" |
| 3 | Aleardo Simoni (ITA) | + 11' 14" |
| 4 | Aristide Cavallini (ITA) | + 18' 30" |
| 5 | José Nicolau (ESP) | + 26' 26" |
| 6 | Cipriano Elys (ESP) | + 32' 34" |
| 7 | Ettore Balmamion (ITA) | + 49' 03" |
| 8 | Valeriano Riera (ESP) | + 51' 15" |
| 9 | Antonio Escuriet (ESP) | + 1h 04' 55" |
| 10 | Amulio Viarengo (ITA) | + 1h 05' 22" |
