= 1930 Giro d'Italia =

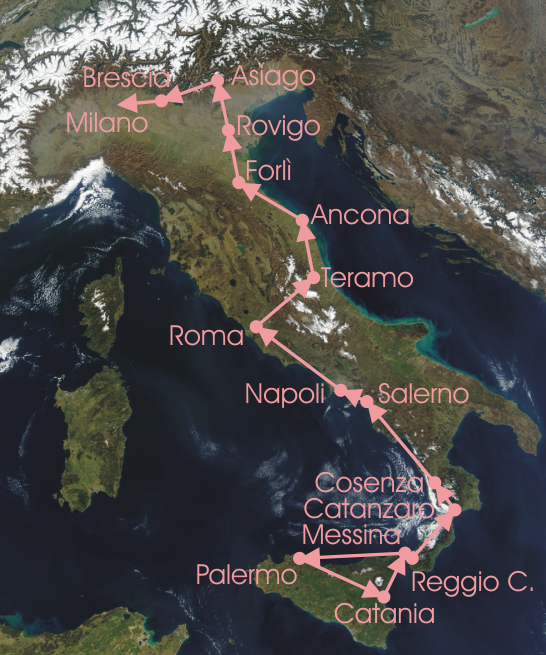
- Race Route

Race details
- Dates: May 17 – June 8, 1930
- Stages: 15
- Distance: 3,095 km (1,923 mi)
- Winning time: 115h 11' 55"

Results
| | Winner | Luigi Marchisio (ITA) | (Legnano) |
| | Second | Luigi Giacobbe (ITA) | (Maino) |
| | Third | Allegro Grandi (ITA) | (Bianchi) |
| | Team | (Italy) Bianchi - Pirelli | |

The 1930 Giro d'Italia was the 18th edition of the Giro d'Italia, organized and sponsored by the newspaper La Gazzetta dello Sport. The race began on 17 May in Milan with a stage that stretched 174 km (108 mi) to Turin, finishing back in Milan on 8 June after a 280 km (174 mi) stage and a total distance covered of 3,095 km (1,923 mi). The race was won by Luigi Marchisio of the Legnano team. Second and third respectively were the Italian riders Luigi Giacobbe and Allegro Grandi.

After the fourth victory (third in a row) of Alfredo Binda in the 1929 edition, organizers paid him 22,500 lire (a sum equal to the prize for the overall winner) to not take part in the race. This edition was the first with stages taking place in Sicily.

== Participants ==
Of the 298 riders that began the Giro d'Italia on 17 May, 126 of them made it to the finish in Milan on 8 June. Riders were allowed to ride on their own or as a member of a team. There were six teams that competed in the race: Bianchi-Pirelli, Dei-Pirelli, Gloria-Hutchinson, Legnano-Pirelli, Maino-Clément, and Prina-Hutchinson. Some riders that were not in a team (isolati) were combined into regional teams.

The peloton was primarily composed of Italians. Four-time winner and reigning champion Alfredo Binda did not compete in this running of the Giro because the organizers felt he was too dominant and paid his team manager 22,500 lire — the same amount as the first place rider would receive that year — to keep Binda off the start list. The field contained no former winners of the Giro d'Italia. Some notable Italian riders that started the race included Antonio Pesenti, Antonio Negrini, Giuseppe Pancera, and Domenico Piemontesi.

== Race overview ==
As the peloton made its way by the volcanic Mount Etna during stage two, Luigi Marchisio got hit in the eye by some volcanic rock. This prompted him to wear a covering over his eyes for several days after the incident.

In stage 3, Marchisio took control of the race by winning the stage, and becoming the new race leader.

Marchisio escaped in the fourth stage, and won time on all other riders, increasing his lead in the general classification to almost five minutes on Giacobbe. In the sixth stage, Giacobbe did not win, but finished four minutes ahead of Marchisio. Marchisio's lead was down to 33 seconds.

From stage seven to the end of the Giro, Marchisio did not let Giacobbe ride away. Marchisio kept his small lead until the end of the Giro, and became the winner of the 1930 Giro.

== Final standings ==
=== Stage results ===
Sicily was visited for the first time in 1930.

Stage results
| Stage | Date | Course | Distance | Type (Note: In 1930, there was no distinction in the rules between plain stages and mountain stages; the icons shown here indicate that the first, second, fifth, sixth, eighth, ninth, tenth, eleventh, thirteenth, fourteenth, and fifteenth stages included major mountains.) | Winner | Race Leader |
|---|---|---|---|---|---|---|
| 1 | 17 May | Messina to Catania | 174 km (108 mi) | Stage with mountain(s) | Michele Mara (ITA) | Michele Mara (ITA) |
| 2 | 18 May | Catania to Palermo | 280 km (174 mi) | Stage with mountain(s) | Leonida Frascarelli (ITA) | Antonio Negrini (ITA) |
| 3 | 20 May | Palermo to Messina | 257 km (160 mi) | Plain stage | Luigi Marchisio (ITA) | Luigi Marchisio (ITA) |
| 4 | 22 May | Reggio Calabria to Catanzaro | 173 km (107 mi) | Plain stage | Luigi Marchisio (ITA) | Luigi Marchisio (ITA) |
| 5 | 23 May | Catanzaro to Cosenza | 118 km (73 mi) | Stage with mountain(s) | Domenico Piemontesi (ITA) | Luigi Marchisio (ITA) |
| 6 | 25 May | Cosenza to Salerno | 292 km (181 mi) | Stage with mountain(s) | Allegro Grandi (ITA) | Luigi Marchisio (ITA) |
| 7 | 27 May | Salerno to Naples | 180 km (112 mi) | Plain stage | Raffaele Di Paco (ITA) | Luigi Marchisio (ITA) |
| 8 | 28 May | Naples to Rome | 247 km (153 mi) | Stage with mountain(s) | Learco Guerra (ITA) | Luigi Marchisio (ITA) |
| 9 | 30 May | Rome to Teramo | 203 km (126 mi) | Stage with mountain(s) | Michele Mara (ITA) | Luigi Marchisio (ITA) |
| 10 | 31 May | Teramo to Ancona | 185 km (115 mi) | Stage with mountain(s) | Michele Mara (ITA) | Luigi Marchisio (ITA) |
| 11 | 2 June | Ancona to Forlì | 182 km (113 mi) | Stage with mountain(s) | Learco Guerra (ITA) | Luigi Marchisio (ITA) |
| 12 | 3 June | Forlì to Rovigo | 188 km (117 mi) | Plain stage | Michele Mara (ITA) | Luigi Marchisio (ITA) |
| 13 | 5 June | Rovigo to Asiago | 150 km (93 mi) | Stage with mountain(s) | Antonio Pesenti (ITA) | Luigi Marchisio (ITA) |
| 14 | 6 June | Asiago to Brescia | 186 km (116 mi) | Stage with mountain(s) | Leonida Frascarelli (ITA) | Luigi Marchisio (ITA) |
| 15 | 8 June | Brescia to Milan | 280 km (174 mi) | Stage with mountain(s) | Michele Mara (ITA) | Luigi Marchisio (ITA) |
| Total | | 3,095 km (1,923 mi) | | | | |

=== General classification ===
There were 67 cyclists who had completed all fifteen stages. For these cyclists, the times they had needed in each stage was added up for the general classification. The cyclist with the least accumulated time was the winner. Aristide Cavallini won the prize for best ranked isolati rider in the general classification.

Final general classification (1–10)
| Rank | Name | Team | Time |
|---|---|---|---|
| 1 | Luigi Marchisio (ITA) | Legnano | 115h 11' 55" |
| 2 | Luigi Giacobbe (ITA) | Maino | + 52" |
| 3 | Allegro Grandi (ITA) | Bianchi | + 1' 49" |
| 4 | Ambrogio Morelli (ITA) | Gloria | + 11' 12" |
| 5 | Antonio Pesenti (ITA) | Dei-Pirelli | + 16' 01" |
| 6 | Antonio Negrini (ITA) | Maino | + 17' 48" |
| 7 | Felice Gremo (ITA) | Legnano | + 22' 28" |
| 8 | Aristide Cavallini (ITA) | — | + 23' 58" |
| 9 | Learco Guerra (ITA) | Maino | + 36' 10" |
| 10 | Amerigo Cacioni (ITA) | — | + 37' 11" |

=== Team classification ===
The Team classification in the Giro d'Italia was (re-)introduced in 1930. It was calculated based on time: the times in the general classification of the highest ranked three riders per team were added, and the team with lowest cumulative time was the winner. In 1930, there were two prizes: the Trofeo Morgnani for professional teams, and the Trofeo Magno for isolated riders who were combined into regions.

Trofeo Morgnani (1–4)
| Rank | Team |
|---|---|
| 1 | Bianchi |
| 2 | Legnano |
| 3 | Maino |
| 4 | Gloria |

The Bianchi team was the only team that did not lose any riders, while Prina-Hutchinson was the only team that did not have any rider finish.

== Aftermath ==
Marchisio, who received medical care on his eye in Palermo, stated later the doctor advised him to abandon the race, but he then said: "Losing my sight is one thing, but not winning the Giro would really have bothered me."
