= 1931 Giro d'Italia =

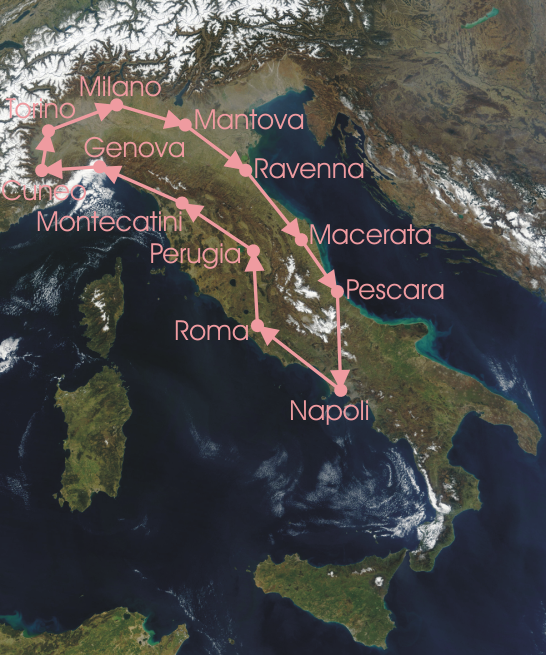
- Race Route

Race details
- Dates: 10–30 May 1931
- Stages: 12
- Distance: 3,012 km (1,872 mi)
- Winning time: 102h 40' 46"

Results
Jersey awarded to the overall winner	Winner	Francesco Camusso (ITA)	(Gloria-Hutchinson)
	Second	Luigi Giacobbe (ITA)	(Maino)
	Third	Luigi Marchisio (ITA)	(Legnano)
	Team	Legnano	

The 1931 Giro d'Italia was the 19th edition of the Giro d'Italia, organized and sponsored by the newspaper La Gazzetta dello Sport. The race began on 10 May in Milan with a stage that stretched 206 km (128 mi) to Mantua, finishing back in Milan on 31 May after a 263 km (163 mi) stage and a total distance covered of 3,012 km (1,872 mi). The race was won by the Francesco Camusso of the Gloria team. Second and third respectively were the Italian riders Luigi Giacobbe and Luigi Marchisio.

It was the first edition in which the leader used the pink jersey (maglia rosa) for the leader of the general classification. The first cyclist to wear it was Learco Guerra.

== Participants ==
Of the 109 riders that began the Giro d'Italia on 10 May, 65 of them made it to the finish in Milan on 31 May. Riders were allowed to ride on their own or as a member of a team. There were seven teams that competed in the race: Bianchi-Pirelli, Ganna-Dunlop, Gloria-Hutchinson, Legnano-Hutchinson, Maino-Clément, Touring-Pirelli, and Olympia-Spiga.

The peloton was primarily composed of Italians. The field featured three former Giro d'Italia champions in four-time winner Alfredo Binda, single-time winner Gaetano Belloni, and reigning champion Luigi Marchisio. Other notable Italian riders that started the race included Learco Guerra, Michele Mara, Felice Gremo, and Domenico Piemontesi. Frenchman Antonin Magne — who would go on to win the Tour de France twice — competed in the race, as well as future world champion, Belgian rider Jean Aerts. This race also saw the first Spanish riders compete with Mariano Cañardo and Ricardo Montero.

== Race overview ==
The first stage was won in a sprint by Guerra, who became the leader of the general classification, and thus the first rider ever to don the pink jersey. Guerra also won the sprint in the second stage, but lost several minutes in the third stage. Binda won that third stage, and became the new leader.

The sixth stage was won by Ettore Meini, who was an isolated rider without team support. This was the last time that an isolated rider won a stage in the Giro d'Italia. Binda crashed during that stage and lost the lead, and would abandon before the next stage.

In the next few stages, the lead changed a few times. Guerra became leader after the eighth stage. In the ninth stage, Guerra collided with another rider, and had to leave the race in the leader's jersey.

Marchisio inherited the pink jersey, with Giacobbe and Mara close behind him. In the tenth stage, a group of three riders (Luigi Giacobbe, Francesco Camusso and Aristide Cavallini) beat the rest with a margin of a few minutes, and Giacobbe became the new race leader, with Camusso in second place.

In the eleventh stage, Camusso attacked. Giacobbe was not able to follow him, and Camusso won solo, taking the lead in the general classification. In the last stage, the standings did not change, so Camusso became the winner of the 1931 Giro d'Italia.

== Final standings ==
=== Stage results ===
Stage results
Stage	Date	Course	Distance	Type (Note: In 1931, there was no distinction in the rules between plain stages and mountain stages; the icons shown here indicate that the third, fourth, fifth, sixth, seventh, ninth, tenth, eleventh, and twelfth stages included major mountains.)	Winner	Race Leader
1	10 May	Milan to Mantua	206 km (128 mi)	Plain stage	Learco Guerra (ITA)	Learco Guerra (ITA)
2	11 May	Mantua to Ravenna	216 km (134 mi)	Plain stage	Learco Guerra (ITA)	Learco Guerra (ITA)
3	13 May	Ravenna to Macerata	288 km (179 mi)	Stage with mountain(s)	Alfredo Binda (ITA)	Alfredo Binda (ITA)
4	15 May	Macerata to Pescara	234 km (145 mi)	Stage with mountain(s)	Alfredo Binda (ITA)	Alfredo Binda (ITA)
5	17 May	Pescara to Naples	282 km (175 mi)	Stage with mountain(s)	Michele Mara (ITA)	Alfredo Binda (ITA)
6	19 May	Naples to Rome	256 km (159 mi)	Plain stage	Ettore Meini (ITA)	Michele Mara (ITA)
7	21 May	Rome to Perugia	247 km (153 mi)	Stage with mountain(s)	Learco Guerra (ITA)	Luigi Marchisio (ITA)
8	23 May	Perugia to Montecatini Terme	246 km (153 mi)	Plain stage	Learco Guerra (ITA)	Learco Guerra (ITA)
9	25 May	Montecatini Terme to Genoa	248 km (154 mi)	Stage with mountain(s)	Michele Mara (ITA)	Luigi Marchisio (ITA)
10	27 May	Genoa to Cuneo	263 km (163 mi)	Stage with mountain(s)	Luigi Giacobbe (ITA)	Luigi Giacobbe (ITA)
11	29 May	Cuneo to Turin	252 km (157 mi)	Stage with mountain(s)	Francesco Camusso (ITA)	Francesco Camusso (ITA)
12	31 May	Turin to Milan	263 km (163 mi)	Stage with mountain(s)	Ambrogio Morelli (ITA)	Francesco Camusso (ITA)
Total		3,012 km (1,872 mi)				

=== General classification ===
There were 65 cyclists who had completed all fifteen stages. For these cyclists, the times they had needed in each stage was added up for the general classification. The cyclist with the least accumulated time was the winner. Aristide Cavallini won the prize for best ranked isolati rider in the general classification.

Final general classification (1–10)
Rank	Name	Team	Time
1	Francesco Camusso (ITA)	Gloria-Hutchinson	102h 40' 46"
2	Luigi Giacobbe (ITA)	Maino	+ 2' 47"
3	Luigi Marchisio (ITA)	Legnano	+ 6' 15"
4	Aristide Cavallini (ITA)	—	+ 10' 15"
5	Ettore Balmamion (ITA)	—	+ 12' 15"
6	Augusto Zanzi (ITA)	Ganna	+ 12' 16"
7	Antonio Pesenti (ITA)	—	+ 13' 50"
8	Ambrogio Morelli (ITA)	Bianchi	+ 16' 59"
9	Felice Gremo (ITA)	Legnano	+ 27' 05"
10	Eugenio Gestri (ITA)	Legnano	+ 32' 25"

=== Isolati ===
Isolati classification (1–5)
Rank	Name	Time
1	Aristide Cavallini (ITA)	102h 51' 01"
2	Ettore Balmamion (ITA)	+ 2' 30"
3	Antonio Pesenti (ITA)	+ 3' 35"
4	Renato Scorticati (ITA)	+ 40' 55"
5	Casimiro Bianchin (ITA)	+ 52' 20"

=== Team classification ===
Team classification (1–4)
Rank	Team
1	Legnano
2	Gloria
3	Ganna
4	Maino-Clement

There was no team that finished with all riders, while Olympia-Spina was the only team that did not have any rider finish.
