= 1932 Giro d'Italia =

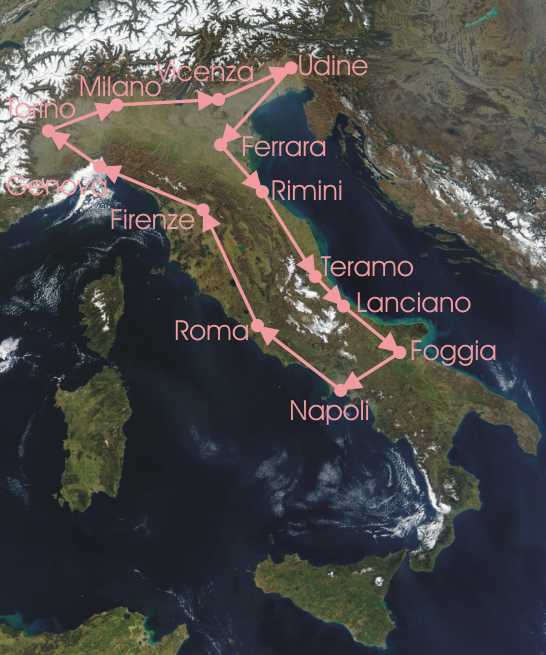
- Race Route

Race details
- Dates: 14 May – 5 June 1932
- Stages: 13
- Distance: 3,235 km (2,010 mi)
- Winning time: 105h 42' 41"

Results
Jersey awarded to the overall winner	Winner	Antonio Pesenti (ITA)	(Wolsit)
	Second	Jef Demuysere (BEL)	(Ganna)
	Third	Remo Bertoni (ITA)	(Gloria)
	Team	(Italy) Legnano	

The 1932 Giro d'Italia was the 20th edition of the Giro d'Italia, organized and sponsored by the newspaper La Gazzetta dello Sport. The race began on 14 May in Milan with a stage that stretched 207 km (129 mi) to Vicenza, finishing back in Milan on 5 June after a 271 km (168 mi) stage and a total distance covered of 3,235 km (2,010 mi). The race was won by the Antonio Pesenti of the Wolsit team. Second and third respectively were the Belgian Jef Demuysere and Italian Remo Bertoni.

It was one of the last participations of Costante Girardengo, 39 years old, who classified second in the first stage, but then retired during the fifth stage. The 47-year-old age Giovanni Gerbi, nicknamed "the Red Devil", also took part, but also didn't succeed in concluding the race. Gerbi would still ride all stages as unclassified rider.

== Participants ==
Of the 109 riders that began the Giro d'Italia on 14 May, 66 of them made it to the finish in Milan on 5 June. Riders were allowed to ride on their own or as a member of a team. There were ten teams that competed in the race: Atala-Hutchinson, Bianchi-Pirelli, France Sport-Pirelli, Ganna-Dunlop, Gloria-Hutchinson, Ilva-Pirelli, Legnano-Hutchinson, Maino-Clément, Olympia-Superga, and Wolsit-Hutchinson.

The peloton was primarily composed of Italians. The field featured four former Giro d'Italia champions in four-time winner Alfredo Binda, two-time champion Costante Girardengo, 1920 winner Gaetano Belloni, and reigning winner Francesco Camusso. Other notable Italian riders that started the race included Learco Guerra, Giovanni Gerbi, Felice Gremo, and Domenico Piemontesi. The reigning winner of the Tour de France, Frenchman Antonin Magne, raced started the Giro, along with Belgian Jef Demuysere who finished second at the 1931 Tour de France.

== Race summary ==
As in the year before, Guerra won the first stage, and became the first leader in the general classification.

In the second stage, Buse escaped solo, and won by a margin of more than eleven minutes. He became the first German rider to ever lead the Giro.

Buse stayed in the lead until the sixth stage. In the seventh stage, Pesenti attacked. The riders rode faster than expected, and reached the finish one hour earlier than scheduled, which almost caused a problem because the stadium had to be opened for the riders to enter. Pesenti won the stage, and took enough time to become the new leader of the general classification. Pesenti had started the race as team mate of Alfredo Binda, and was not seen as a favorite for the victory. After this seventh stage, Binda declared that Pesenti would be the new captain in the team.

In the eighth stage, Gerbi was disqualified after receiving help from a car. Gerbi did not accept this, and continued to ride all stages, joining the race. He was not included in the results.

The twelfth stage ended in a sprint, won by Giaccobe. The jury decided that his sprint had been irregular, and he was demoted to the last place of the group, giving the stage victory to Bertoni who originally had finished in second place.

Pesenti's lead was never in danger, and Pesenti became the winner of the 1932 Giro.

== Route and stages ==
Stage results
Stage	Date	Course	Distance	Type (Note: In 1932, there was no distinction in the rules between plain stages and mountain stages; the icons shown here indicate that the fourth, fifth, sixth, tenth, eleventh, twelfth, and thirteenth stages included major mountains.)	Winner
1	14 May	Milan to Vicenza	207 km (129 mi)	Plain stage	Learco Guerra (ITA)
2	15 May	Vicenza to Udine	183 km (114 mi)	Plain stage	Hermann Buse (GER)
3	17 May	Udine to Ferrara	225 km (140 mi)	Plain stage	Fabio Battesini (ITA)
4	18 May	Ferrara to Rimini	215 km (134 mi)	Stage with mountain(s)	Learco Guerra (ITA)
5	20 May	Rimini to Teramo	286 km (178 mi)	Stage with mountain(s)	Raffaele Di Paco (ITA)
6	22 May	Teramo to Lanciano	220 km (137 mi)	Stage with mountain(s)	Learco Guerra (ITA)
7	24 May	Lanciano to Foggia	280 km (174 mi)	Plain stage	Antonio Pesenti (ITA)
8	26 May	Foggia to Naples	217 km (135 mi)	Plain stage	Learco Guerra (ITA)
9	28 May	Naples to Rome	265 km (165 mi)	Plain stage	Learco Guerra (ITA)
10	30 May	Rome to Florence	321 km (199 mi)	Stage with mountain(s)	Ettore Meini (ITA)
11	1 June	Florence to Genoa	276 km (171 mi)	Stage with mountain(s)	Remo Bertoni (ITA)
12	3 June	Genoa to Turin	267 km (166 mi)	Stage with mountain(s)	Ettore Meini (ITA)
13	5 June	Turin to Milan	271 km (168 mi)	Stage with mountain(s)	Learco Guerra (ITA)
Total		3,235 km (2,010 mi)			

== Classification leadership ==
The leader of the general classification – calculated by adding the stage finish times of each rider – wore a pink jersey. This classification is the most important of the race, and its winner is considered as the winner of the Giro.

The race organizers allowed isolated riders to compete in the race, which had a separate classification calculated the same way as the general classification. In addition, there was a classification dedicated to only foreign, non-Italian riders, which was calculated in the same manner.

The winner of the team classification was determined by adding the finish times of the best three cyclists per team together and the team with the lowest total time was the winner. If a team had fewer than three riders finish, they were not eligible for the classification.

Il Trofeo Magno (English: the Great Trophy) was a classification for independent Italian riders competing in the race. The riders were divided into teams based on the region of Italy they were from. The calculation of the standings was the same for the team classification. At the end of the race, a trophy was awarded to the winning team and it was then stored at the Federal Secretary of the P.N.P. in their respective province.

The rows in the following table correspond to the jerseys awarded after that stage was run.

Stage	Winner	General classification	Best foreign rider	Best isolati rider	Team classification	Il Trofeo Magno
1	Learco Guerra	Learco Guerra	Kurt Stöpel	?	?	?
2	Hermann Buse	Hermann Buse	Hermann Buse	?	?	?
3	Fabio Battesini	Hermann Buse	Hermann Buse	Carniselli	Atala-Hutchinson	Lombardia
4	Learco Guerra	Hermann Buse	Hermann Buse	Aristide Cavallini, Marco Giuntelli, Angelo Lalle, & Vitali	Atala-Hutchinson	Lombardia
5	Raffaele Di Paco	Hermann Buse	Hermann Buse	Aristide Cavallini & Vitali	Atala-Hutchinson	Lombardia
6	Learco Guerra	Hermann Buse	Hermann Buse	Luigi Tramontini	?	?
7	Antonio Pesenti	Antonio Pesenti	Kurt Stöpel	Francesco Bonino	Legnano-Hutchinson	Piemonte
8	Learco Guerra	Antonio Pesenti	Jef Demuysere	Aristide Cavallini	Legnano-Hutchinson	Piemonte
9	Learco Guerra	Antonio Pesenti	Jef Demuysere	Aristide Cavallini	Legnano-Hutchinson	?
10	Alfredo Binda	Antonio Pesenti	Jef Demuysere	Aristide Cavallini	Legnano-Hutchinson	?
11	Fernand Cornez	Antonio Pesenti	Jef Demuysere	Aristide Cavallini	Legnano-Hutchinson	?
12	Giuseppe Olmo	Antonio Pesenti	Jef Demuysere	Aristide Cavallini	Legnano-Hutchinson	Calabria-Sicilia
13	Learco Guerra	Antonio Pesenti	Jef Demuysere	Aristide Cavallini	Legnano-Hutchinson	Calabria-Sicilia
Final		Antonio Pesenti	Jef Demuysere	Aristide Cavallini	Legnano-Hutchinson	Calabria-Sicilia

== Final standings ==
Legend
A pink jersey	Denotes the winner of the General classification

=== General classification ===
There were 66 cyclists who had completed all thirteen stages. For these cyclists, the times they had needed in each stage was added up for the general classification. The cyclist with the least accumulated time was the winner.

Final general classification (1–10)
Rank	Name	Team	Time
1	Antonio Pesenti (ITA)	Wolsit-Hutchinson	105h 42' 41"
2	Jef Demuysere (BEL)	Ganna-Dunlop	+ 11' 09"
3	Remo Bertoni (ITA)	Legnano-Hutchinson	+ 12' 27"
4	Learco Guerra (ITA)	Maino-Clement	+ 16' 34"
5	Kurt Stöpel (GER)	Atala-Hutchinson	+ 17' 21"
6	Michele Mara (ITA)	Bianchi-Pirelli	+ 17' 34"
7	Alfredo Binda (ITA)	Legnano-Hutchinson	+ 19' 27"
8	Luigi Barral (ITA)	Olympia-Superga	+ 25' 01"
9	Felice Gremo (ITA)	Legnano-Hutchinson	+ 27' 24"
10	Renato Scorticati (ITA)	Olympia-Superga	+ 37' 56"

=== Foreign rider classification ===
Final foreign rider classification (1–10)
Rank	Name	Team	Time
1	Jef Demuysere (BEL)	Ganna-Dunlop	105h 53' 50"
2	Kurt Stöpel (GER)	Atala-Hutchinson	+ 6' 12"
3	Julien Vervaecke (BEL)	Ganna-Dunlop	+ 27' 40"
4	Hermann Buse (GER)	Atala-Hutchinson	+ 42' 43"
5	Raymond Louviot (FRA)	France Sport-Pirelli	+ 1h 10' 48"
6	Émile Decroix (BEL)	Ganna-Dunlop	+ 1h 17' 47"
7	Antonin Magne (FRA)	France Sport-Pirelli	+ 1h 36' 18"
8	Ludwig Geyer (GER)	Atala-Hutchinson	+ 1h 37' 44"
9	Julien Moineau (FRA)	?	+ 2h 20' 02"
10	André Godinat (FRA)	?	+ 2h 34' 15"

=== Isolati rider classification ===
Final isolati rider classification (1–10)
Rank	Name	Time
1	Aristide Cavallini (ITA)	106h 27' 19"
2	Francesco Bonino (ITA)	+ 1' 59"
3	Agostino Bellandi (ITA)	+ 4' 02"
4	Ettore Balmamion (ITA)	+ 10' 01"
5	Luigi Tramontini (ITA)	+ 18' 48"
6	Carlo Moretti (ITA)	+ 20' 57"
7	Mario Praderio (ITA)	+ 47' 59"
8	Armando Zucchini (ITA)	+ 53' 52"
9	Nicolo Mammina (ITA)	+ 53' 55"
10	Marco Giuntelli (ITA)	+ 59' 32"

=== Team classification ===
Final team classification (1–7)
Rank	Team	Time
1	Legnano-Hutchinson	318h 07' 21"
2	Ganna-Dunlop	+ 47' 02"
3	Maino-Clement	+ 1h 16' 30"
4	Olympia-Superga	+ 1h 25' 12"
5	Atala-Hutchinson	+ 1h 58' 32"
6	Bianchi-Pirelli	+ 3h 22' 34"
7	France Sport-Pirelli	+ 4h 41' 17"

=== Il Trofeo Magno ===
Final Il Trofeo Magno classification (1–3)
Rank	Team	Time
1	Calabria-Sicilia	325h 43' 22"
2	Campania	+ 1h 50' 01"
3	Puglie	+ 11h 30' 14"
