= Léon Fichot =

French cyclist

Personal information
- Born: 12 October 1906
- Died: 15 August 1992 (aged 85)

Cycling career
- Sport: Cycling
- Discipline: Road
- Role: Rider

Léon Fichot (French: [leɔ̃ fiʃo]; 12 October 1906 – 15 August 1992) was a French racing cyclist. He rode in the 1932 Tour de France.
