= Jozef Horemans =

Belgian cyclist

Personal information
- Born: 8 September 1910
- Died: 24 October 1977 (aged 67)

Cycling career
- Sport: Cycling
- Discipline: Road
- Role: Rider

Jozef Horemans (8 September 1910 – 24 October 1977) was a Belgian racing cyclist. He rode in the 1932 Tour de France.
