= Hermann Müller (cyclist) =

German cyclist (1911–?)

Personal information
- Born: 30 November 1911

Cycling career
- Sport: Cycling
- Discipline: Road
- Role: Rider

Hermann Müller (born 30 November 1911, date of death unknown) was a German racing cyclist. He rode in the 1932 Tour de France.
