= Ernst Hofer (cyclist) =

Swiss cyclist (1902–1944)

Personal information
- Born: 17 December 1902
- Died: 1944 (aged 41–42)

Cycling career
- Sport: Cycling
- Discipline: Road
- Role: Rider

Ernst Hofer (17 December 1902 – 1944) was a Swiss racing cyclist. He rode in the 1932 Tour de France. Hofer died in 1944.
