= Auguste Pitte =

French cyclist

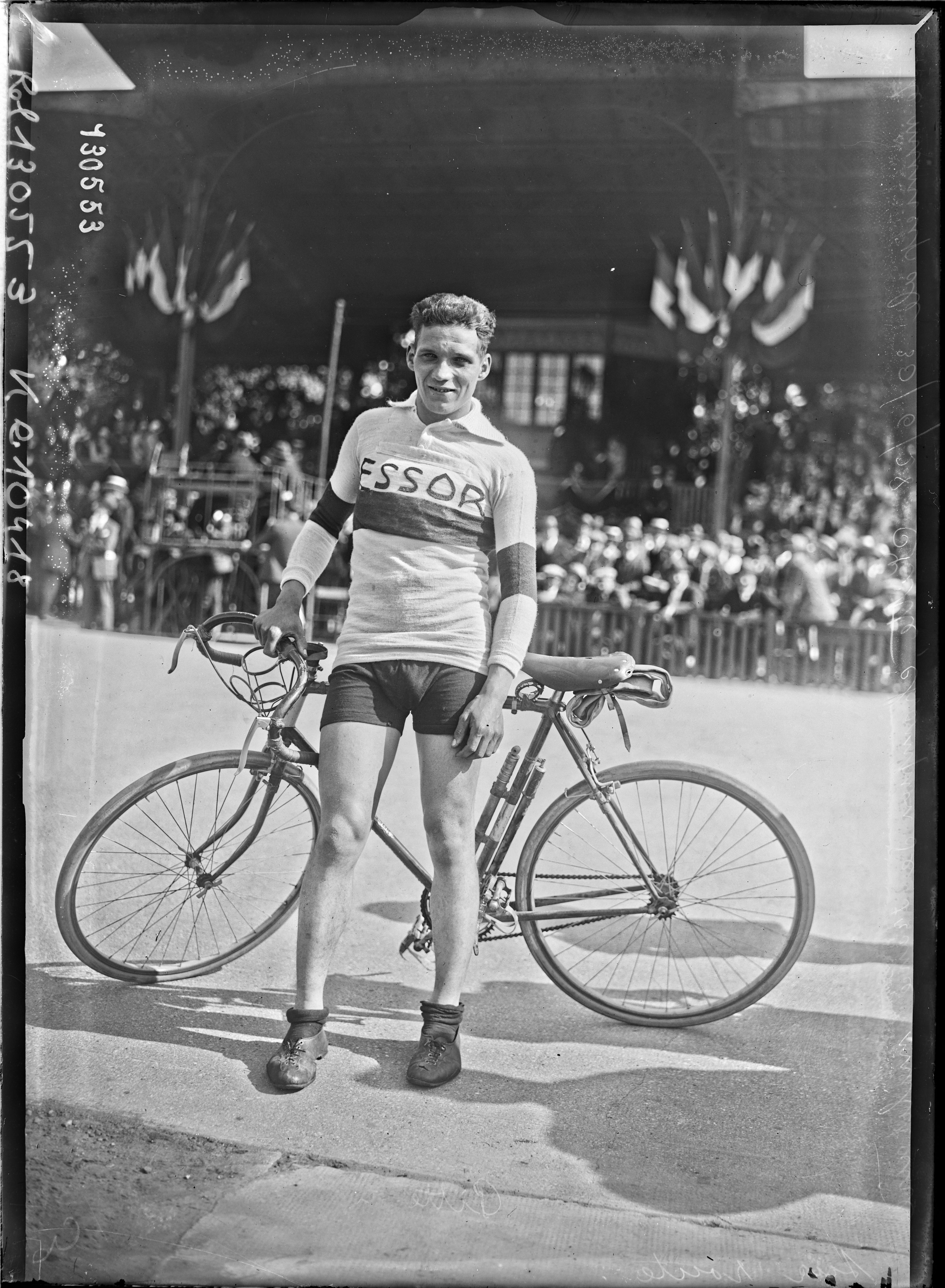

Personal information
- Born: 10 June 1907
- Died: 10 November 1963 (aged 56)

Cycling career
- Sport: Cycling
- Discipline: Road
- Role: Rider

Auguste Pitte (10 June 1907 – 10 November 1963) was a French racing cyclist. He rode in the 1932 Tour de France.
