= Joseph Puy =

French cyclist

Personal information
- Born: 9 July 1907
- Died: 30 October 1980 (aged 73)

Cycling career
- Sport: Cycling
- Discipline: Road
- Role: Rider

Joseph Puy (9 July 1907 – 30 October 1980) was a French racing cyclist. He rode in the 1932 Tour de France.
