= Luigi Giacobbe =

Italian cyclist

Personal information
- Full name: Luigi Giacobbe
- Born: 1 January 1907 Bosco Marengo, Italy
- Died: 1 December 1995 (aged 88) Novi Ligure, Italy

Cycling career
- Sport: Cycling
- Discipline: Road
- Role: Rider

Professional teams
- 1927–1928: Wolsit-Pirelli
- 1928: Legnano-Torpedo
- 1929–1936: Maino-Clement

Major wins
- Tre Valli Varesine (1931); Giro d'Italia, 1 stage

Luigi Giacobbe (1 January 1907 – 1 December 1995) was an Italian professional cyclist, who raced from 1926 to 1937.

He was born in Bosco Marengo, Piedmont. He won the Tre Valli Varesine in 1931 and a stage in the 1931 Giro d'Italia. At the Giro, he was second overall in 1930 and 1931. He took part to three Tour de France in 1931, 1933 and 1935.

Giacobbe died at Novi Ligure in 1995.
