= 1932 Tour de France =

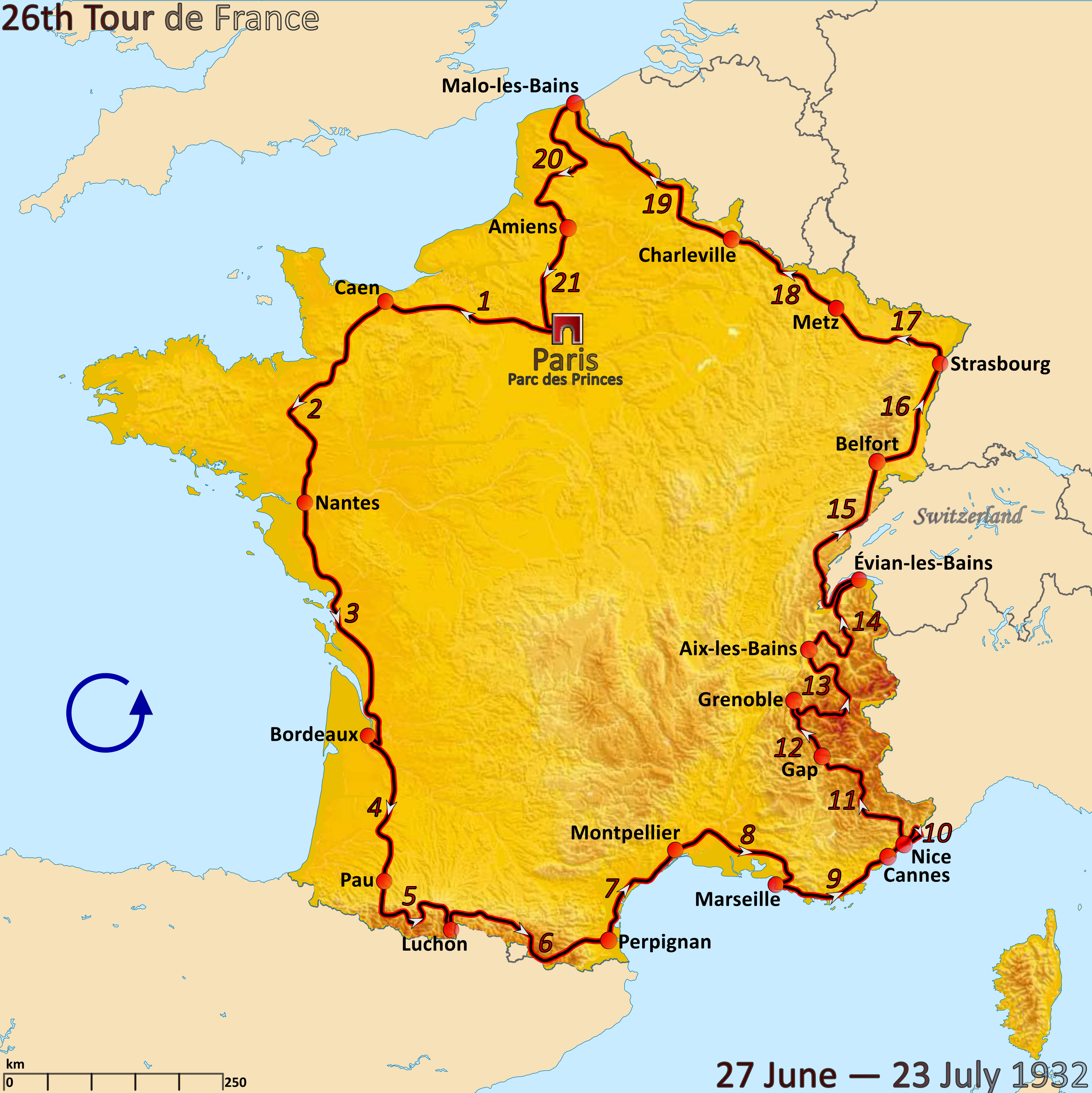
- Route of the 1932 Tour de France followed counterclockwise, starting in Paris

Race details
- Dates: 6–31 July 1932
- Stages: 21
- Distance: 4,479 km (2,783 mi)
- Winning time: 154h 11' 49"

Results
Jersey awarded to the overall winner	Winner	André Leducq (FRA)	(France)
	Second	Kurt Stöpel (GER)	(Germany/Austria)
	Third	Francesco Camusso (ITA)	(Italy)
	Team	Italy	

The 1932 Tour de France was the 26th edition of the Tour de France, taking place from 6 to 31 July. It consisted of 21 stages over 4,479 km (2,783 mi).

André Leducq, who also won six stages, won the race, thanks to the bonification system; had the bonification system not existed, the margin between Leducq and Kurt Stöpel would only have been three seconds.

== Innovations and changes ==
In the 1931 Tour de France, there had been a time bonification system, which gave 3 minutes of bonification to the winner of the stage, if he finished more than three minutes ahead of the second cyclist in that stage. In 1932, this bonification system changed: now the winner of the stage received 4 minutes, the second-placed cyclist 2 minutes and the third-placed cyclist 1 minute, plus an extra three minutes if the margin was more than three minutes. The bonification system was invented to give sprinters, who lost a lot of time in the mountains, a chance to battle for the general classification.

The number of stages decreased from 24 to 21. The total distance also decreased, so the average length per stage remained about the same, 215 km (compared to 160–170 km in modern Tours).

== Teams ==
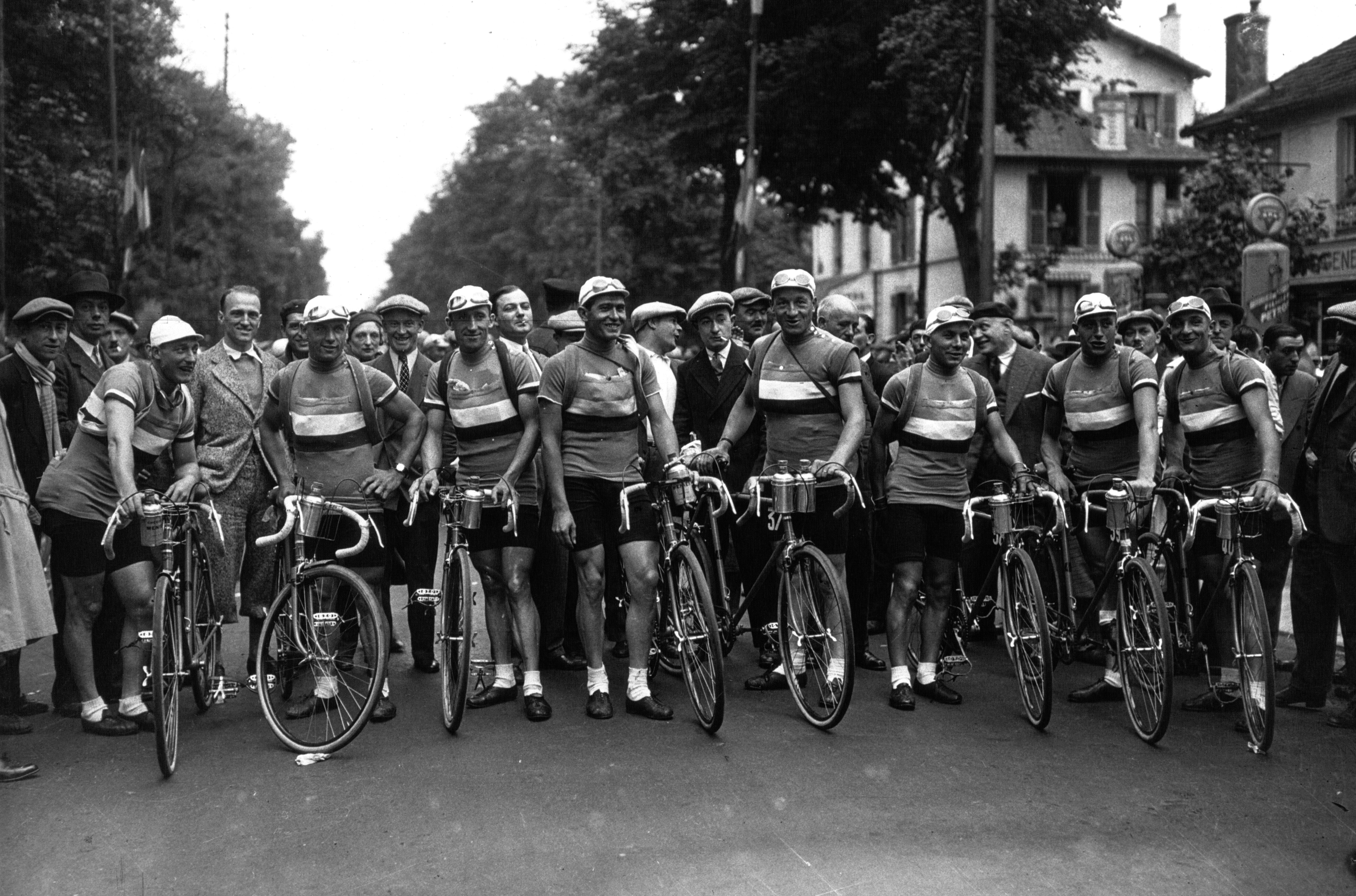
The French team of the 1932 Tour de France

For the third year, the race was run in the national team format, with five different teams. Belgium, Italy, Switzerland and France each sent a team with eight cyclists, while Germany and Austria sent a combined team, with seven German cyclists and one Austrian cyclist. In addition, 40 cyclists joined as touriste-routiers.

Charles Pélissier, who had won 13 stages in the 1930 and 1931 Tours, and Antonin Magne, the winner of 1931, were absent from the French team. Still, there were so many good French cyclists in that time that the French team was still considered superior.

The Italian team included three Giro d'Italia winners: the winner from the 1930 Giro d'Italia, Luigi Marchisio; the winner from the 1931 Giro d'Italia, Francesco Camusso and the winner from the 1932 Giro d'Italia, Antonio Pesenti.

The Belgium team had Jef Demuysere, who had fought for the victory in the previous Tour until the end and had come second, and two-time world champion Georges Ronsse.

== Race overview ==
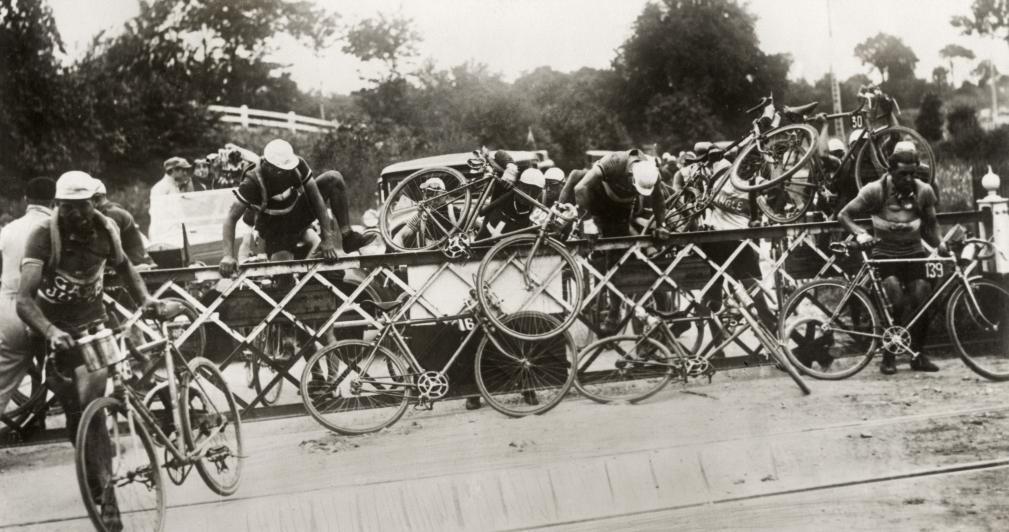
Cyclists climbing the closed barrier of a railway crossing.

In the first stage, the Belgians had a good start. Jean Aerts won the stage, with Jef Demuysere in second place. In the second stage, there were struggles in the Belgian team between the Dutch-speaking and the French-speaking cyclists. Aerst, Dutch-speaking, did not get the support from his French-speaking teammates, and lost ten minutes in that stage, together with the Italian favourites. German Kurt Stöpel won the stage, and donned the yellow jersey, thanks to the bonification. Stöpel was the first German cyclist to lead the general classification in the Tour de France. In the third stage, the longest stage of this Tour with 387 km, Stöpel lost the lead to André Leducq. Leducq kept the lead for the rest of the race, winning six stages along the way. In the fifth stage, Spaniard Vicente Trueba escaped and reached the top of the Col d'Aubisque first. On the way down, Benoît Fauré overtook him, and reached the Tourmalet first. But he didn't win the stage, as Italian Antonio Pesenti caught him. Behind the leaders in the stage, Leducq was fighting for the leading position in the general classification. He was not a good climber, but was one of the best descenders.

On one stage, Leducq flatted, and received a wheel from his teammate Georges Speicher, who would win the next Tour.

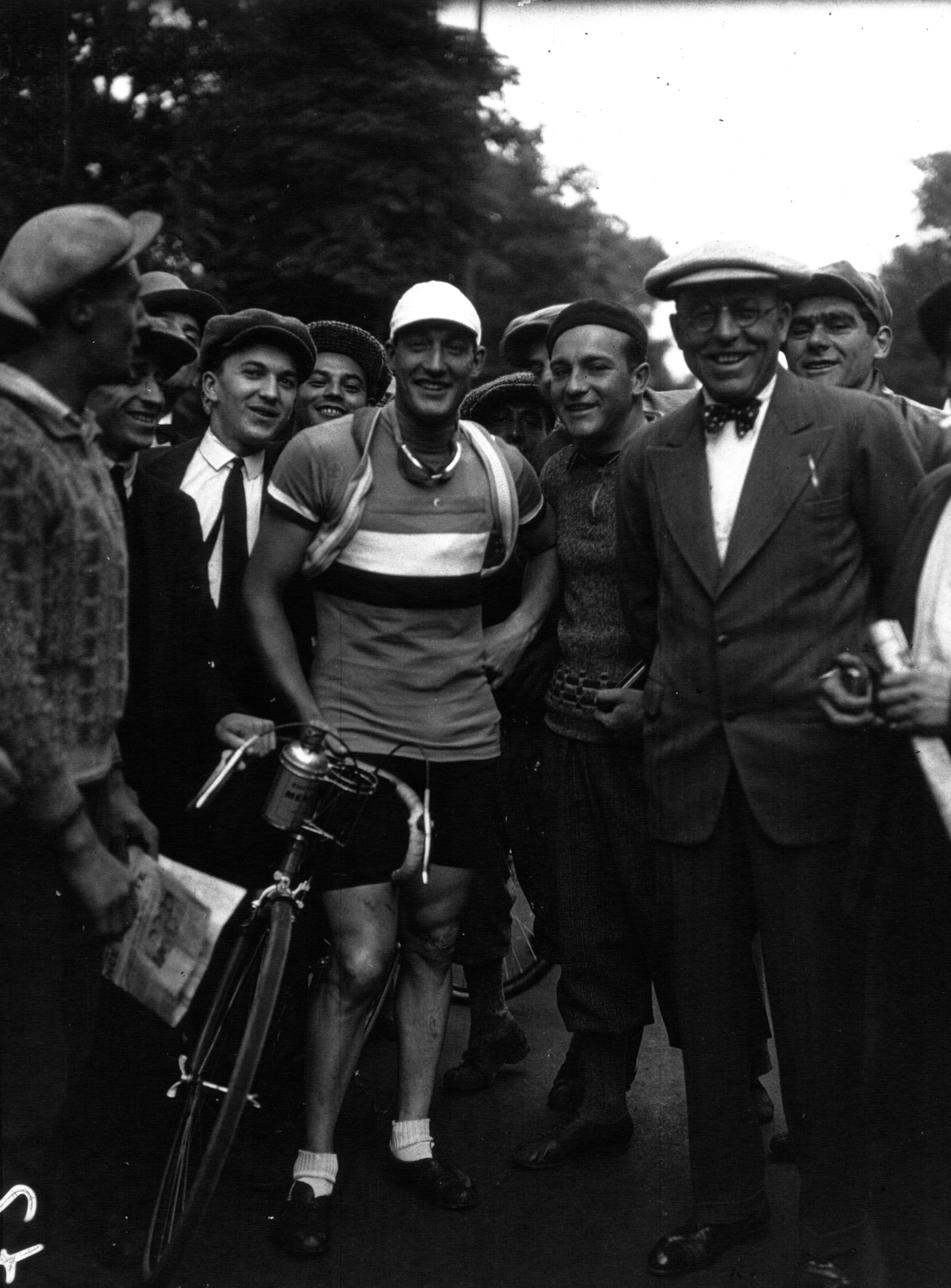
André Leducq, winner of the 1934 Tour de France (pictured at the Tour)

In the tenth stage, Leducq almost lost the lead. Camusso had escaped, and Stöpel had followed him. Leducq lost more than five minutes in the stage, and even more due to the bonification time. After that stage, Stöpel was within three minutes of Leducq, and Camusso within six minutes. In the eleventh stage, Leducq could have lost the race. Benoît Fauré, a French cyclist riding as a touriste-routier, escaped, and was followed by Francesco Camusso. At one point, they were so far ahead that Camusso was the virtual leader, but eventually they were caught back.

Leducq also crossed the finishline first in the eighteenth stage, but the jury relegated him because he had been pushed by Albert Barthélemy.

Leducq and Stöpel finished in the same group for most of the stages. Only in four stages was there a time difference:

- Stage 3, when Leducq won 45 seconds
- Stage 5, when Leducq won 20 seconds
- Stage 10, when Stöpel won 2 minutes and 52 seconds
- Stage 13, when Leducq won 1 minute and 50 seconds

Without the bonification system, the time difference between Leducq and Stöpel was three seconds. Leducq received 31 bonification minutes (six first places, two second places and three third place), while Stöpel received only 7 bonification minutes (one first place and three third places).

== Results ==
The cyclist to reach the finish in the least time was the winner of the stage. The time that each cyclist required to finish the stage was recorded. For the general classification, these times were added together. If a cyclist had received a time bonus, it was subtracted from this total; all time penalties were added to this total. The cyclist with the least accumulated time was the race leader, identified by the yellow jersey.

The team classification was calculated by adding up the times in the general classification of the three highest ranking cyclists per team; the team with the least time was the winner.

=== Stage winners ===
Stage characteristics and winners
Stage	Date	Course	Distance	Type (Note: There was no distinction in the rules between plain stages and mountain stages; the icons shown here indicate which stages included mountains, and which were run as time trials.)	Winner	Race leader
1	6 July	Paris to Caen	208 km (129 mi)	Plain stage	Jean Aerts (BEL)	Jean Aerts (BEL)
2	7 July	Caen to Nantes	300 km (190 mi)	Plain stage	Kurt Stöpel (GER)	Kurt Stöpel (GER)
3	9 July	Nantes to Bordeaux	387 km (240 mi)	Plain stage	André Leducq (FRA)	André Leducq (FRA)
4	11 July	Bordeaux to Pau	206 km (128 mi)	Plain stage	Georges Ronsse (BEL)	André Leducq (FRA)
5	12 July	Pau to Luchon	229 km (142 mi)	Stage with mountain(s)	Antonio Pesenti (ITA)	André Leducq (FRA)
6	14 July	Luchon to Perpignan	322 km (200 mi)	Stage with mountain(s)	Frans Bonduel (BEL)	André Leducq (FRA)
7	16 July	Perpignan to Montpellier	168 km (104 mi)	Plain stage	Frans Bonduel (BEL)	André Leducq (FRA)
8	17 July	Montpellier to Marseille	206 km (128 mi)	Plain stage	Michele Orecchia (ITA)	André Leducq (FRA)
9	18 July	Marseille to Cannes	191 km (119 mi)	Plain stage	Rafaele di Paco (ITA)	André Leducq (FRA)
10	19 July	Cannes to Nice	132 km (82 mi)	Stage with mountain(s)	Francesco Camusso (ITA)	André Leducq (FRA)
11	21 July	Nice to Gap	233 km (145 mi)	Stage with mountain(s)	André Leducq (FRA)	André Leducq (FRA)
12	22 July	Gap to Grenoble	102 km (63 mi)	Stage with mountain(s)	Roger Lapébie (FRA)	André Leducq (FRA)
13	23 July	Grenoble to Aix-les-Bains	230 km (140 mi)	Stage with mountain(s)	André Leducq (FRA)	André Leducq (FRA)
14	24 July	Aix-les-Bains to Evian	204 km (127 mi)	Stage with mountain(s)	Rafaele di Paco (ITA)	André Leducq (FRA)
15	25 July	Evian to Belfort	291 km (181 mi)	Stage with mountain(s)	André Leducq (FRA)	André Leducq (FRA)
16	26 July	Belfort to Strasbourg	145 km (90 mi)	Plain stage	Gérard Loncke (BEL)	André Leducq (FRA)
17	27 July	Strasbourg to Metz	165 km (103 mi)	Plain stage	Rafaele di Paco (ITA)	André Leducq (FRA)
18	28 July	Metz to Charleville	159 km (99 mi)	Plain stage	Rafaele di Paco (ITA)	André Leducq (FRA)
19	29 July	Charleville to Malo-les-Bains	271 km (168 mi)	Plain stage	Gaston Rebry (BEL)	André Leducq (FRA)
20	30 July	Malo-les-Bains to Amiens	212 km (132 mi)	Plain stage	André Leducq (FRA)	André Leducq (FRA)
21	31 July	Amiens to Paris	159 km (99 mi)	Plain stage	André Leducq (FRA)	André Leducq (FRA)
	Total		4,479 km (2,783 mi)			

=== General classification ===
Kurt Stöpel was the first German to reach the podium of the Tour de France. He would be the only German on the podium until Jan Ullrich became 2nd in 1996.

Final general classification (1–10)
Rank	Rider	Team	Time
1	André Leducq (FRA)	France	154h 11' 49"
2	Kurt Stöpel (GER)	Germany/Austria	+ 24' 03"
3	Francesco Camusso (ITA)	Italy	+ 26' 21"
4	Antonio Pesenti (ITA)	Italy	+ 37' 08"
5	Georges Ronsse (BEL)	Belgium	+ 41' 04"
6	Frans Bonduel (BEL)	Belgium	+ 45' 13"
7	Oskar Thierbach (GER)	Germany/Austria	+ 58' 44"
8	Jef Demuysere (BEL)	Belgium	+ 1h 03' 24"
9	Luigi Barral (ITA)	Touriste-routier	+ 1h 06' 57"
10	Georges Speicher (FRA)	France	+ 1h 08' 37"

Final general classification (11–57)
Rank	Rider	Team	Time
11	Albert Büchi (SUI)	Switzerland	+ 1h 13' 33"
12	Benoît Fauré (FRA)	Touriste-Routier	+ 1h 14' 12"
13	Jean Aerts (BEL)	Belgium	+ 1h 16' 24"
14	Michele Orecchia (ITA)	Italy	+ 1h 18' 45"
15	Georges Lemaire (BEL)	Belgium	+ 1h 19' 18"
16	Maurice Archambaud (FRA)	France	+ 1h 25' 27"
17	Jan Wauters (BEL)	Touriste-Routier	+ 1h 29' 21"
18	René Bernard (FRA)	Touriste-Routier	+ 1h 35' 28"
19	Max Bulla (AUT)	Germany/Austria	+ 1h 38' 23"
20	Gaston Rebry (BEL)	Belgium	+ 1h 39' 01"
21	Augusto Zanzi (ITA)	Touriste-Routier	+ 1h 45' 56"
22	Ludwig Geyer (GER)	Germany/Austria	+ 1h 49' 48"
23	Roger Lapébie (FRA)	France	+ 1h 55' 27"
24	Marcel Mazeyrat (FRA)	Touriste-Routier	+ 1h 56' 53"
25	Julien Moineau (FRA)	France	+ 1h 58' 16"
26	Luigi Marchisio (ITA)	Italy	+ 1h 59' 47"
27	Vicente Trueba (ESP)	Touriste-Routier	+ 2h 00' 40"
28	Ernest Neuhard (FRA)	Touriste-Routier	+ 2h 22' 21"
29	Georges Antenen (SUI)	Switzerland	+ 2h 24' 39"
30	Marcel Bidot (FRA)	France	+ 2h 29' 02"
31	Marius Guiramand (FRA)	Touriste-Routier	+ 2h 29' 31"
32	Giuseppe Pancera (ITA)	Touriste-Routier	+ 2h 30' 12"
33	Raffaele Di Paco (ITA)	Italy	+ 2h 35' 51"
34	Gérard Loncke (BEL)	Belgium	+ 2h 41' 25"
35	Fernand Fayolle (FRA)	Touriste-Routier	+ 2h 44' 33"
36	Alfred Büchi (SUI)	Switzerland	+ 2h 59' 37"
37	Lazare Venot (FRA)	Touriste-Routier	+ 3h 04' 31"
38	Amulio Viarengo (ITA)	Touriste-Routier	+ 3h 10' 27"
39	Herbert Sieronski (GER)	Germany/Austria	+ 3h 15' 13"
40	Jules Buysse (BEL)	Touriste-Routier	+ 3h 32' 25"
41	Alfred Bula (SUI)	Switzerland	+ 3h 34' 06"
42	Aleardo Simoni (ITA)	Touriste-Routier	+ 3h 38' 18"
43	Émile Decroix (BEL)	Touriste-Routier	+ 3h 43' 20"
44	François Moreels (FRA)	Touriste-Routier	+ 3h 55' 22"
45	Nicolas Frantz (LUX)	Touriste-Routier	+ 4h 00' 17"
46	Jean Goulême (FRA)	Touriste-Routier	+ 4h 06' 02"
47	Louis Peglion (FRA)	France	+ 4h 13' 53"
48	Karl Altenburger (GER)	Touriste-Routier	+ 4h 20' 41"
49	Albert Barthélémy (FRA)	France	+ 4h 21' 05"
50	Jean-Pierre Muller (LUX)	Touriste-Routier	+ 4h 21' 15"
51	François Haas (FRA)	Touriste-Routier	+ 4h 32' 29"
52	Robert Brugère (FRA)	Touriste-Routier	+ 4h 38' 35"
53	Francis Bouillet (FRA)	Touriste-Routier	+ 4h 47' 05"
54	Fernand Cornez (FRA)	Touriste-Routier	+ 4h 47' 18"
55	August Erne (SUI)	Switzerland	+ 4h 54' 45"
56	Georg Umbenhauer (GER)	Germany/Austria	+ 5h 03' 01"
57	Rudolf Risch (GER)	Germany/Austria	+ 5h 05' 14"

=== Team classification ===
Final team classification
Rank	Team	Time
1	Italy	464h 57' 41"
2	Belgium	+ 7' 27"
3	France	+ 11' 50"
4	Germany/Austria	+ 38' 56"
5	Switzerland	+ 4h 14' 25"

=== Other classifications ===
The organising newspaper, l'Auto named a meilleur grimpeur (best climber), an unofficial precursor to the modern King of the Mountains competition. This award was won by Vicente Trueba.

== Aftermath ==
Winner André Leducq kept riding the Tour de France until 1938, but he never managed to win again, although he had three more stage victories.

== Bibliography ==
- Augendre, Jacques (2016). Guide historique [Historical guide] (PDF) (in French). Paris: Amaury Sport Organisation. Archived (PDF) from the original on 17 August 2016.
- McGann, Bill; McGann, Carol (2006). The Story of the Tour de France: 1903–1964. Vol. 1. Indianapolis, IN: Dog Ear Publishing. ISBN 978-1-59858-180-5.
