= François Haas =

French cyclist

Personal information
- Born: 16 October 1907
- Died: 6 May 1996 (aged 88)

Cycling career
- Sport: Cycling
- Discipline: Road
- Role: Rider

François Haas (16 October 1907 – 6 May 1996) was a French racing cyclist. He rode in the 1932 Tour de France.
