= Alfred Büchi (cyclist) =

Swiss cyclist

Personal information
- Born: 2 April 1909

Cycling career
- Sport: Cycling
- Discipline: Road
- Role: Rider

Alfred Büchi (born 2 April 1909, date of death unknown) was a Swiss racing cyclist. He rode in the 1932 Tour de France.
