= Frans Alexander =

Belgian cyclist

Personal information
- Born: 17 July 1908
- Died: 27 April 1998 (aged 89)

Cycling career
- Sport: Cycling
- Discipline: Road
- Role: Rider

Frans Alexander (17 July 1908 – 27 April 1998) was a Belgian racing cyclist. He rode in the 1932 Tour de France.
