= Aldo Canazza =

Italian cyclist

Personal information
- Born: 4 January 1908
- Died: 21 October 2002 (aged 94)

Cycling career
- Sport: Cycling
- Discipline: Road
- Role: Rider

Aldo Canazza (4 January 1908 – 21 October 2002) was an Italian racing cyclist. He rode in the 1932 Tour de France.
