= Rudolf Risch =

German cyclist

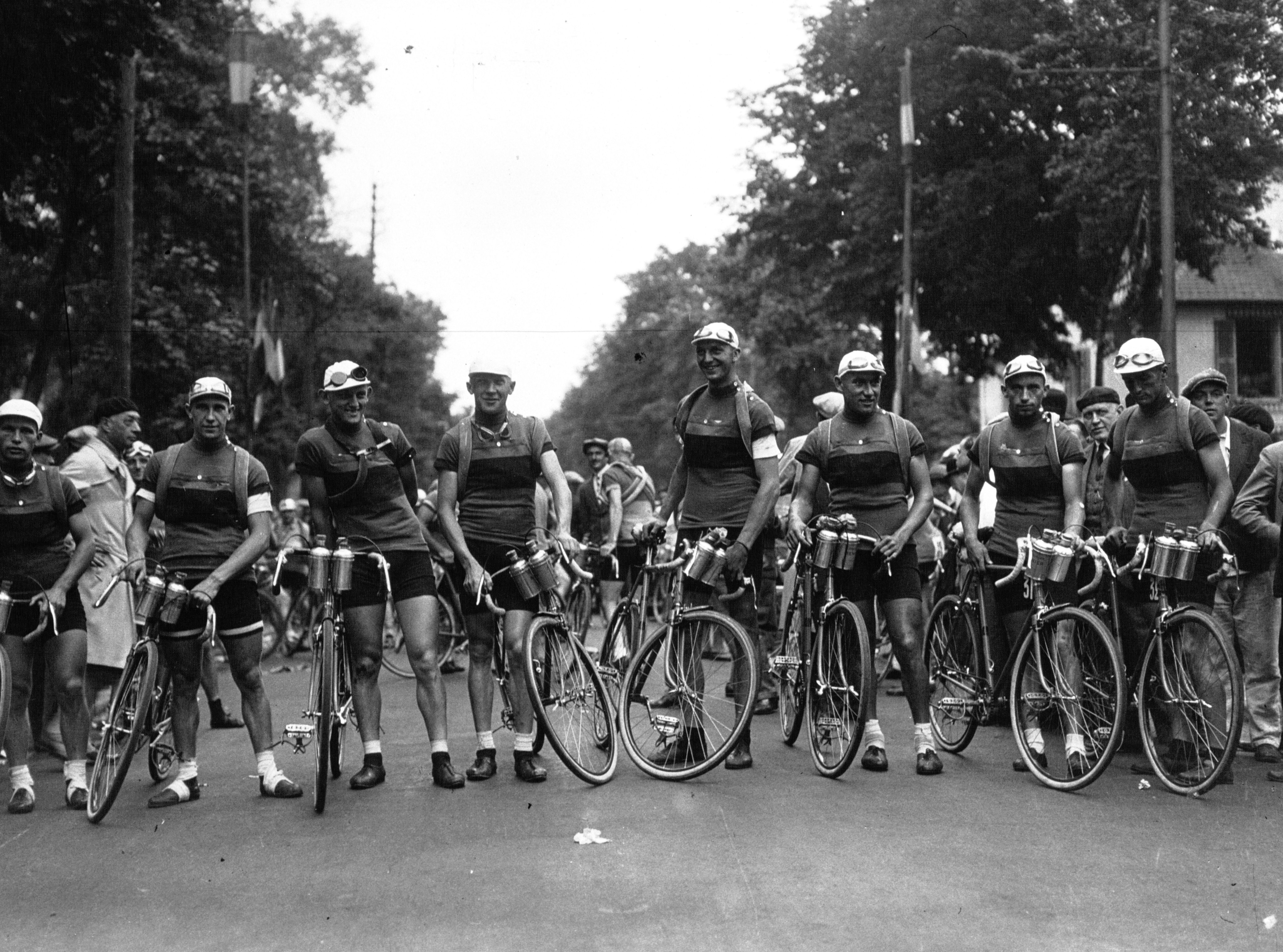
- Risch (far right) at the 1932 Tour de France

Personal information
- Full name: Rudolf Risch
- Born: 20 January 1908 Berlin, Germany
- Died: 22 August 1944 (aged 36) Tighina, Romania

Cycling career
- Sport: Cycling
- Role: Rider

Rudolf Risch (20 January 1908 – 22 August 1944) was a German racing cyclist. He finished in last place in the 1932 Tour de France.
