= Amerigo Cacioni =

Italian cyclist

Personal information
- Born: 3 May 1908
- Died: 12 December 2005 (aged 97)

Cycling career
- Sport: Cycling
- Discipline: Road
- Role: Rider

Amerigo Cacioni (3 May 1908 – 12 December 2005) was an Italian racing cyclist. He rode in the 1932 Tour de France.
