= Maino (cycling team) =

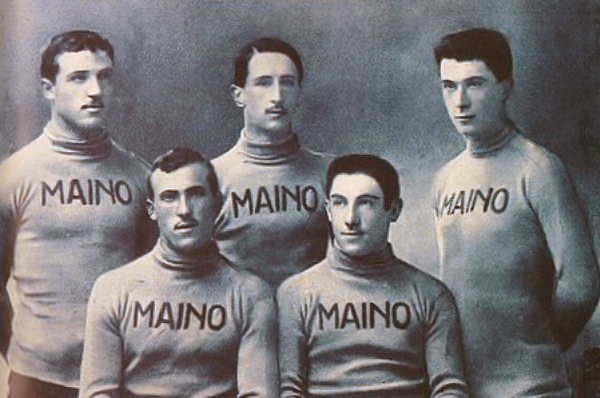
- The Maino squad of the 1913 Giro d'Italia

Team information
- Registered: Italy
- Founded: 1912
- Disbanded: 1936
- Discipline: Road
- Bicycles: Maino

Team name history
- 1912–1913 1914 1915–1916 1922 1923–1924 1927 1928 1929–1934 1935 1936: Maino; Maino–Dunlop; Maino; Maino–Bergougnan; Maino; Maino; Maino–Dunlop; Maino–Clément; Maino–Girardengo; Maino

Maino was an Italian professional cycling team that existed from 1912 to 1936. Riders of the team won four editions of the Giro d'Italia. It was sponsored by Italian bicycle and motorcycle manufacturer Maino.
