= Allegro Grandi =

Italian cyclist

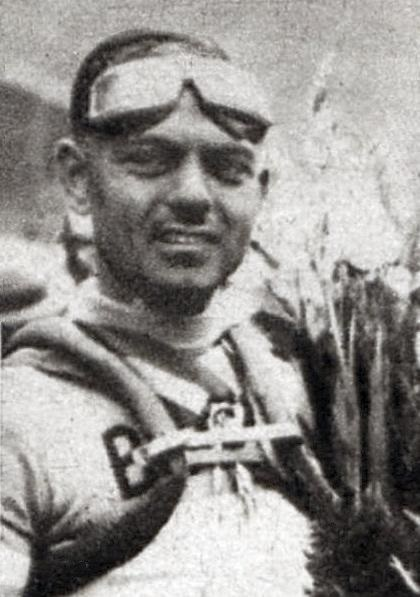

Personal information
- Born: 17 January 1907 San Pietro in Casale, Italy
- Died: 23 April 1973 (aged 66) Caracas, Venezuela

Cycling career
- Sport: Cycling

Allegro Grandi (17 January 1907 – 23 April 1973) was an Italian cyclist. He competed in the individual and team road race events at the 1928 Summer Olympics. Grandi committed suicide in his bicycle shop in Caracas in 1973.
