= Ernest Neuhard =

French cyclist

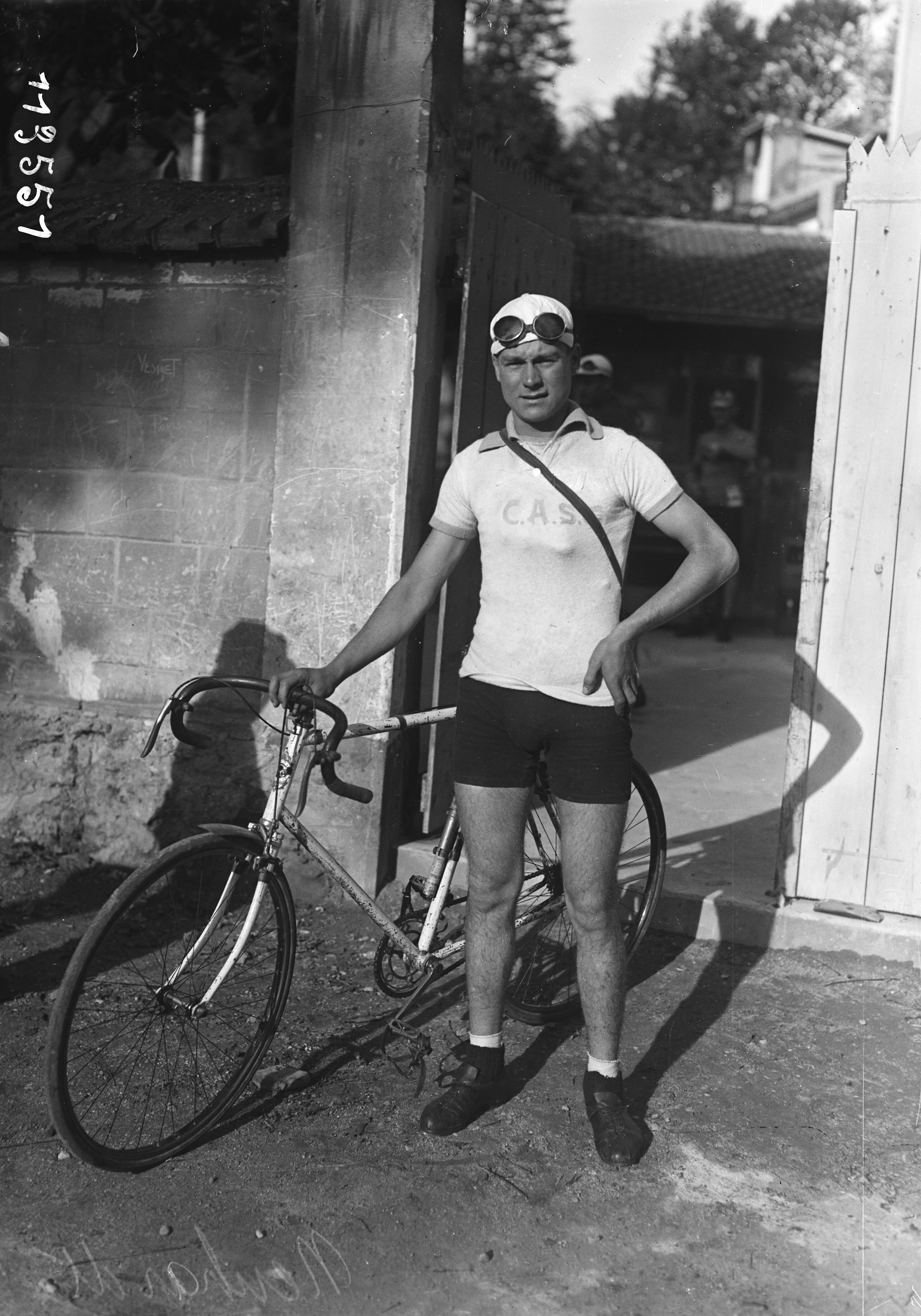

Personal information
- Full name: Ernest Neuhard
- Born: 22 November 1903 Troyes, France
- Died: 10 September 1980 (aged 76) Meaux, France

Cycling career
- Sport: Cycling
- Role: Rider

Ernest Neuhard (22 November 1903 – 10 September 1980) was a French racing cyclist. He finished in last place in the 1933 Tour de France.
