= Robert Brugère =

French cyclist

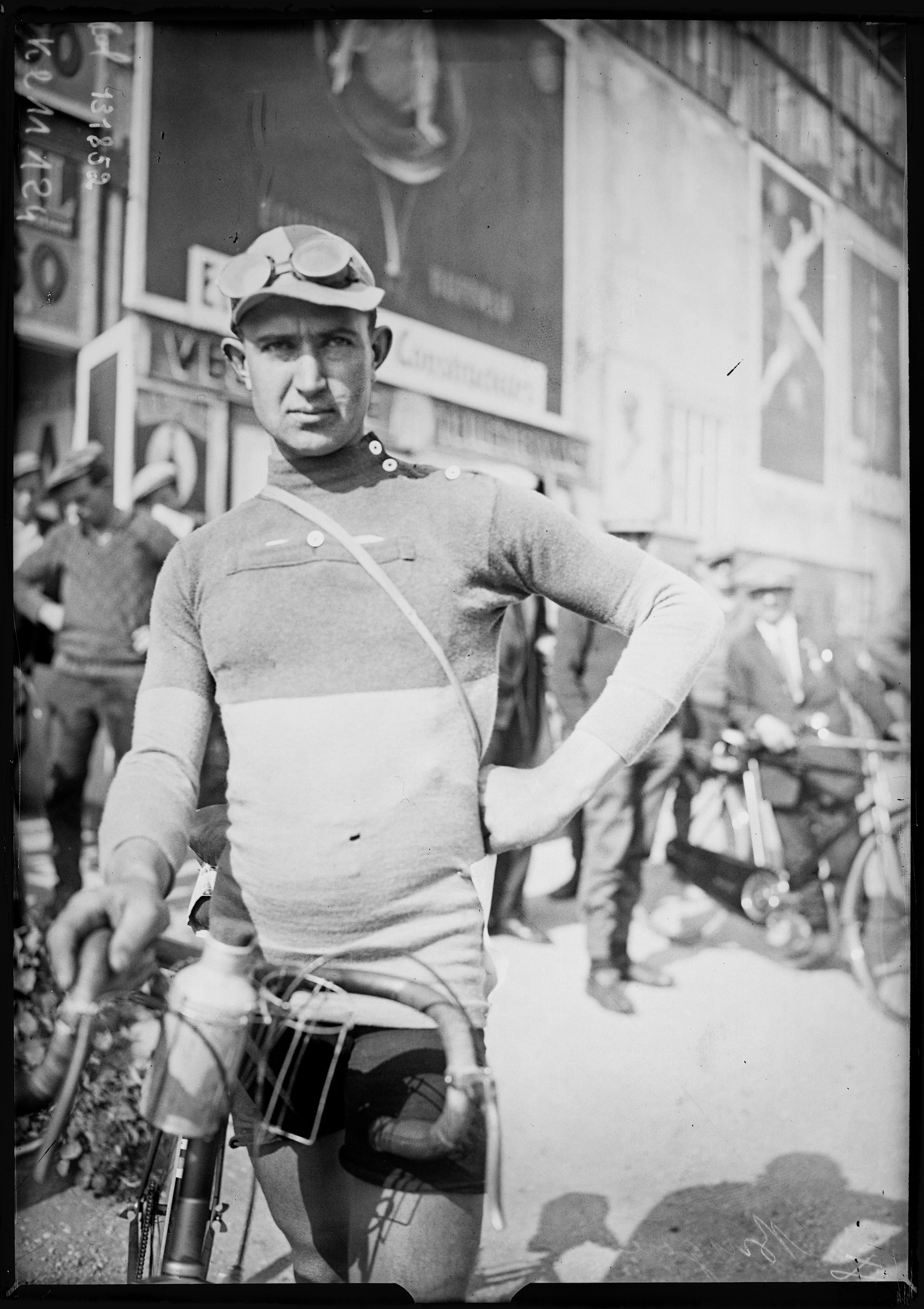

Personal information
- Born: 21 October 1903
- Died: 6 September 1933 (aged 29)

Cycling career
- Sport: Cycling
- Discipline: Road
- Role: Rider

Robert Brugère (21 October 1903 – 6 September 1933) was a French racing cyclist. He rode in the 1928 Tour de France.
