= Jean Wauters =

Belgian cyclist

Personal information
- Born: 25 November 1906
- Died: 15 April 1989 (aged 82)

Cycling career
- Sport: Cycling
- Discipline: Road
- Role: Rider

Jean Wauters (25 November 1906 – 15 April 1989) was a Belgian racing cyclist. He rode in the 1932 Tour de France.
