= Aleardo Simoni =

Italian cyclist

Personal information
- Born: 5 September 1902
- Died: 8 September 1989 (aged 87)

Cycling career
- Sport: Cycling
- Discipline: Road
- Role: Rider

Aleardo Simoni (5 September 1902 – 8 September 1989) was an Italian racing cyclist. He rode in the 1932 Tour de France.
