= Gérard Loncke =

Belgian cyclist

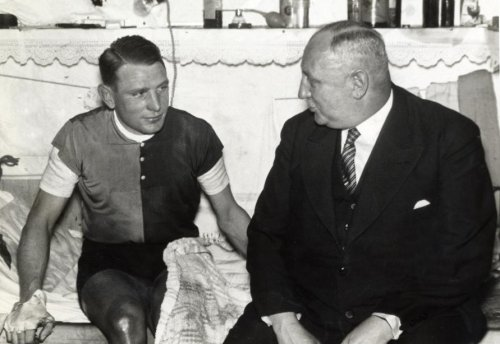

Personal information
- Full name: Gérard Loncke
- Nickname: Karke
- Born: 15 January 1905 Overpelt, Belgium
- Died: 13 March 1979 (aged 74) Neerpelt, Belgium

Cycling career
- Sport: Cycling
- Discipline: Road
- Role: Rider

Major wins
- Two stages Tour de France

Gérard Loncke (15 January 1905 in Overpelt – 13 March 1979 in Neerpelt) was a Belgian professional road bicycle racer. In 1932 he finished 4th place in the Tour de France.

== Major results ==
1930
Omloop der Vlaamse Gewesten
1931
Antwerp-Ghent-Antwerp
Tour de France:

Winner stage 7

1932
Lutlommel
Tour de France:

4th place overall classification
Winner stage 16

1933
Giro d'Italia:

Winner stages 7 and 16

1935
Scheldeprijs Vlaanderen
Deurne-Zuid
GP Stad Sint-Niklaas
Ans
Opglabbeek
