= Raffaele di Paco =

Italian cyclist

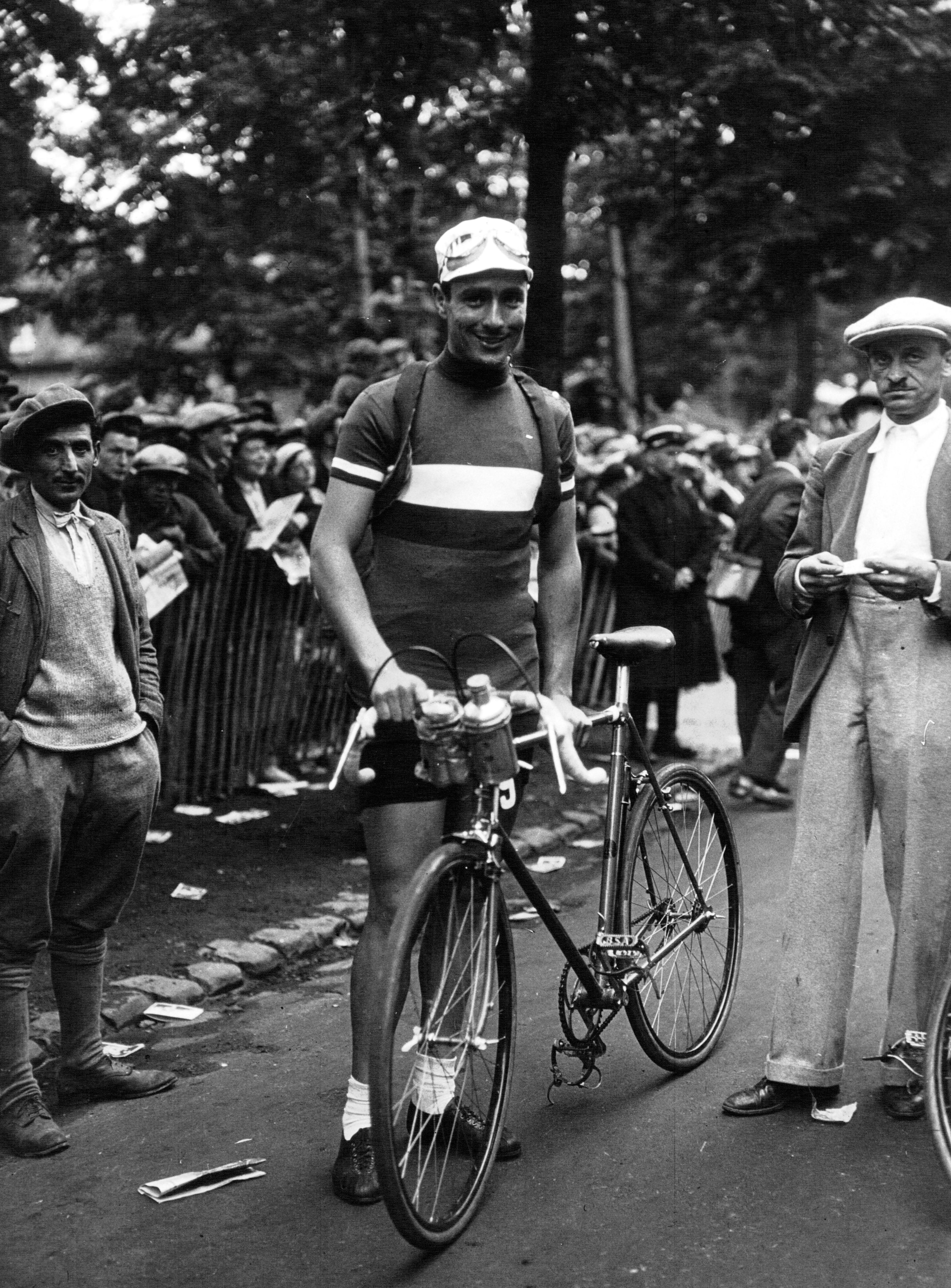

Personal information
- Full name: Raffaele di Paco
- Born: 6 July 1908 Fauglia, Italy
- Died: 21 May 1996 (aged 87) Fauglia, Italy

Cycling career
- Sport: Cycling
- Discipline: Road
- Role: Rider
- Rider type: Sprinter

Major wins
- Grand Tours Tour de France 11 individual stages (1931, 1932, 1935) Giro d'Italia 15 individual stages (1930, 1932, 1935-1938) One-day races and Classics Milano-Mantova (1936)

Raffaele di Paco (6 July 1908–21 May 1996) was an Italian road racing cyclist, who won five stages in the 1931 Tour de France four stages in the 1932 Tour de France and two stages in the 1935 Tour de France, and wore the yellow jersey for a total of four days in 1931. One of these, after stage 5, he shared the lead with Charles Pélissier. Di Paco was born and died in Fauglia, Tuscany.

== Major results ==
1930
1930 Giro d'Italia:

Stage 7

1931
1931 Tour de France:

Stage 10
Stage 11
Stage 19
Stage 21
Stage 22

1932
1932 Tour de France:

Stage 9
Stage 14
Stage 17
Stage 18

1932 Giro d'Italia:

Stage 5

1935
1935 Tour de France:

Stage 3
Stage 5B

1935 Giro d'Italia:

Stage 9
Stage 14
Stage 17
Stage 18

1936
1936 Giro d'Italia:

Stage 3
Stage 7
Stage 10
Stage 14
Stage 15A

Milan-Mantua
1937
1937 Giro d'Italia:

Stage 8B

1938
1938 Giro d'Italia:

Stage 8
Stage 10
Stage 12
