= Georges Antenen =

Swiss cyclist (1903–1979)

Personal information
- Born: 20 December 1903 La Chaux-de-Fonds, Switzerland
- Died: 25 March 1979 (aged 75)

Cycling career
- Sport: Cycling

Georges Antenen (20 December 1903 – 25 March 1979) was a Swiss cyclist. He competed in two events at the 1924 Summer Olympics. He was also the Swiss National Road Race champion in 1930 and 1933.
