= Ernesto Zanzi =

Italian cyclist

Personal information
- Born: 9 July 1904 Varese, Kingdom of Italy
- Died: 23 July 1979 (aged 75)

Cycling career
- Sport: Cycling
- Discipline: Road
- Role: Rider

Ernesto Zanzi (9 July 1904 – 23 July 1979) was an Italian racing cyclist. He rode in the 1932 Tour de France.
