= Karl Altenburger =

German cyclist

Personal information
- Born: 27 August 1909
- Died: 2 February 1978 (aged 68)

Cycling career
- Sport: Cycling
- Discipline: Road
- Role: Rider

Karl Altenburger (27 August 1909 – 2 February 1978) was a German racing cyclist. He rode in the 1931 Tour de France.
