= Felice Gremo =

Italian cyclist

Personal information
- Born: 23 December 1901 Turin
- Died: 6 February 1994 (aged 92) Santena

Cycling career
- Sport: Cycling
- Discipline: Road
- Role: Rider

Felice Gremo (23 December 1901 – 6 February 1994) was an Italian racing cyclist. He rode in the 1930 Tour de France.
