= Luigi Barral =

Italian-French cyclist

Personal information
- Born: 23 March 1907 Perosa Argentina, Italy
- Died: 7 November 1962 (aged 55) Lyon, France

Cycling career
- Sport: Cycling
- Discipline: Road
- Role: Rider

Professional teams
- 1929–1931: Individual
- 1932–1933: Olympia
- 1934: Bianchi
- 1935: Individual
- 1936: Helyett–Hutchinson
- 1937: Il Bertoldo
- 1938: Azzini US
- 1939: Individual

Luigi Barral (23 March 1907 in Perosa Argentina – 7 November 1962 in Lyon) was an Italian cyclist. He became a French citizen in 1949.

== Major results ==
1931
1st Giro di Campania
1932
1st Mount Faron Hill Climb
1st Grand Prix de Nice
2nd Grand Prix de Cannes
8th Overall Giro d'Italia
9th Overall Tour de France
1933
1st Nice–Mont Agel
2nd Giro di Lombardia
3rd Circuit de la Haute-Savoie
1934
1st Nice–Mont Agel
1st Mount Faron Hill Climb
3rd Tre Valli Varesine
10th Overall Giro d'Italia
1935
1st Grand Prix de Nice
1st Nice–Mont Agel
3rd Marseille–Nice
3rd Circuit des villes d'eaux d'Auvergne
1936
1st Marseille–Nice
1st Nice–Mont Agel
1st Puy de Dome
3rd Tour du Vaucluse
3rd Giro di Lombardia
1937
1st Circuit des Cols Pyrénéens
1st Mount Faron Hill Climb
1st Nice–Mont Agel
2nd Polymultipliée
3rd Grand Prix de Cannes
1938
2nd Nice–Mont Agel
1939
1st Mount Faron Hill Climb
