= Antonio Pesenti (cyclist) =

Italian cyclist

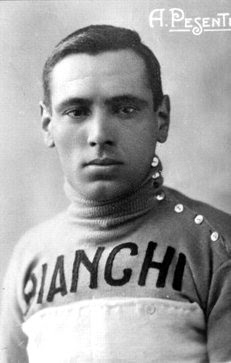

Personal information
- Full name: Antonio Pesenti
- Born: 17 May 1908 Zogno, Italy
- Died: 10 June 1968 (aged 60) Bergamo, Italy

Cycling career
- Sport: Cycling
- Discipline: Road
- Role: Rider

Professional teams
- 1929: Individual
- 1930–1931: Dei
- 1932: Wolsit-Hutchinson/Dei
- 1933: Dei
- 1934: Oscar Egg-Hutchinson
- 1935: Dei
- 1936–1937: Individual
- 1938–1939: Urago

Major wins
- Grand Tours Giro d'Italia General classification (1932) 2 individual stages (1930, 1932) Tour de France 1 individual stage (1932)

Antonio Pesenti (17 May 1908 – 10 June 1968) was an Italian professional road racing cyclist. The highlight of his career was his overall win in the 1932 Giro d'Italia. He also placed third and fourth overall in the 1931 and 1932 Tour de France, respectively.

== Major results ==
1930
5th Overall Giro d'Italia

1st Stage 13

1931
3rd Overall Tour de France
7th Overall Giro d'Italia
10th Giro di Lombardia
1932
1st Overall Giro d'Italia

1st Stage 7

4th Overall Tour de France

1st Stage 5

8th Milan–San Remo
1935
6th Giro del Veneto
