= Aristide Cavallini =

Italian cyclist

Personal information
- Born: 26 October 1899
- Died: 18 February 1973 (aged 73)

Cycling career
- Sport: Cycling
- Discipline: Road
- Role: Rider

Aristide Cavallini (26 October 1899 – 18 February 1973) was an Italian racing cyclist. He rode in the 1931 Tour de France.
