= Kurt Stöpel =

German cyclist

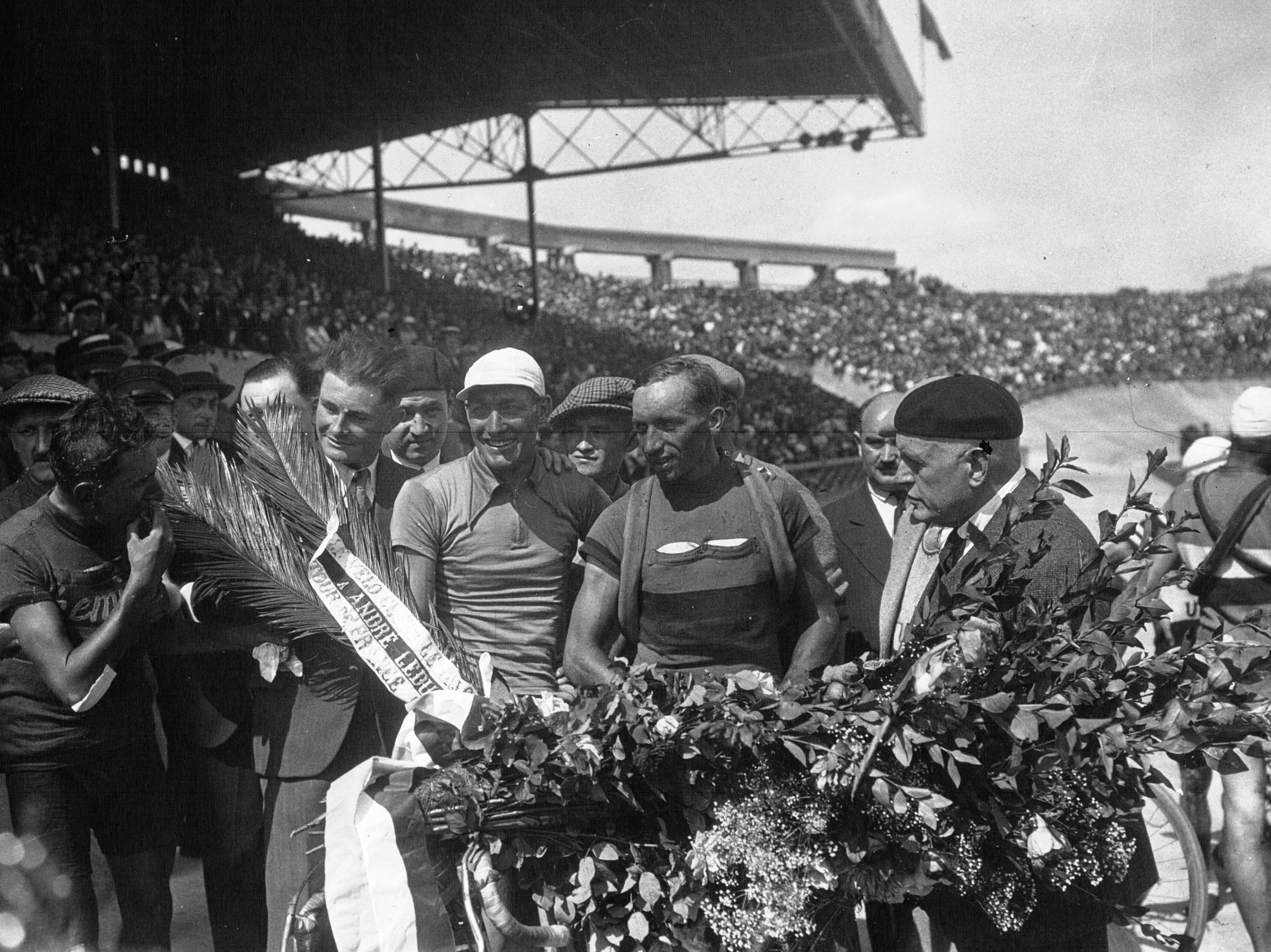

Personal information
- Full name: Kurt Stöpel
- Born: 12 March 1908 Berlin, Germany
- Died: 11 June 1997 (aged 89) Berlin, Germany

Cycling career
- Sport: Cycling
- Discipline: Road
- Role: Rider

Major wins
- German championship 1 stage Tour de France

Kurt Stöpel (12 March 1908 – 11 June 1997) was a German professional road bicycle racer. In the 1932 Tour de France, Stöpel won the second stage and was leading the general classification for one day, and finished in second place in the final general classification. He was the first German to wear the yellow jersey, and the first German to finish on the podium in Paris. He won the German National Road Race in 1934.

== Major results ==
1931
Stage 12 Deutschland Tour
1932
Tour de France:

Winner stage 2
Wearing yellow jersey for one day
Second place general classification

1934
Germany national road race champion
Rund um Köln
