= Luigi Marchisio =

Italian cyclist

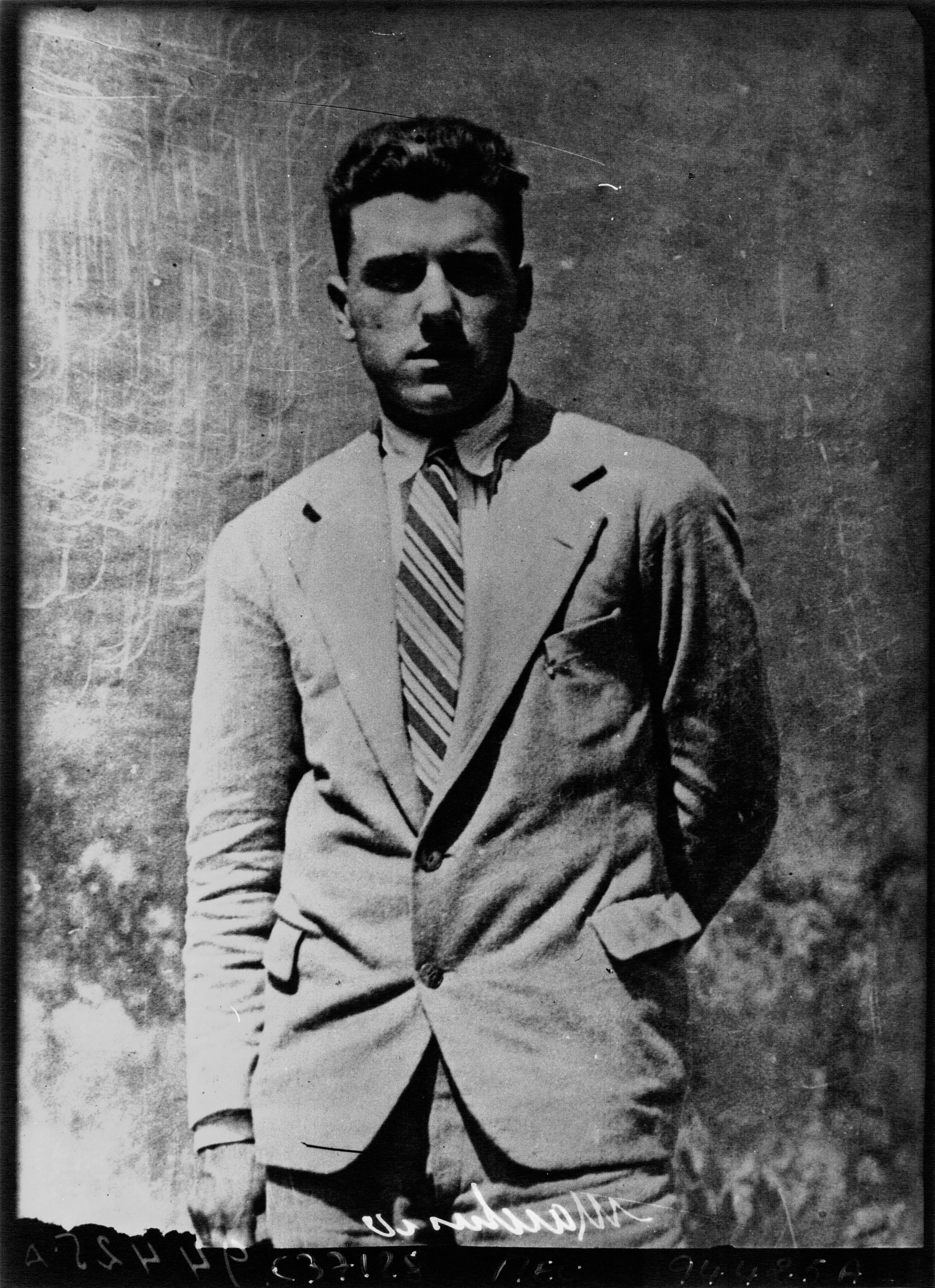

Personal information
- Full name: Luigi Marchisio
- Born: 26 April 1909 Castelnuovo Don Bosco, Italy
- Died: 3 July 1992 (aged 83)

Cycling career
- Sport: Cycling
- Discipline: Road
- Role: Rider

Professional teams
- 1929–1931: Legnano
- 1932: Bianchi
- 1933: Olympia
- 1934–1936: Individual

Major wins
- Grand Tours Giro d'Italia General classification (1930)

Luigi Marchisio (26 April 1909 – 3 July 1992) was an Italian professional road racing cyclist.

Marchisio was born at Castelnuovo, Piedmont. The highlight of his career was his overall victory in the 1930 Giro d'Italia. At the time, he was the youngest rider to win the race, a record surpassed by Fausto Coppi in 1940. Marchisio was also 3rd in the 1931 Giro d'Italia, but subsequently he failed to achieve any result of note. He retired in 1936.

Marchisio died in 1992.
