= Francesco Camusso =

Italian cyclist

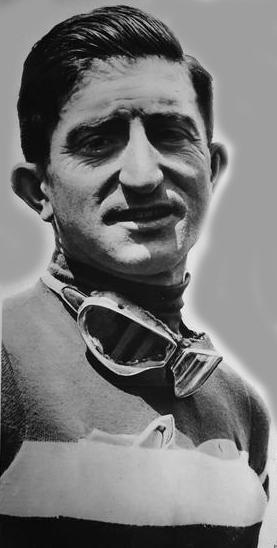

Personal information
- Born: 9 March 1908 Cumiana, Italy
- Died: 23 June 1995 (aged 87) Turin, Italy

Cycling career
- Sport: Cycling
- Discipline: Road
- Role: Rider
- Rider type: Climber

Professional teams
- 1929–1934: Gloria
- 1935–1936: Legnano
- 1937: Il Bertoldo
- 1938: Gloria

Major wins
- Grand Tours Giro d'Italia General classification (1931)

Francesco Camusso (9 March 1908 – 23 June 1995) was an Italian professional road racing cyclist.

Camusso was born in Cumiana, Piedmont, and is ranked among the best Italian climbers ever. In his second year as professional, he won the 1931 Giro d'Italia. In the following year he won a stage at the Tour de France, finished third overall.

His other results include a second place in the 1934 Giro d'Italia and a fourth in the 1935 Tour de France.

He died at Turin in 1995.

== Major results ==
1931
Giro d'Italia:

Winner overall classification
Winner 1 stage

1932
Tour de France:

3rd overall
Winner stage 10

1934
2nd overall – Giro d'Italia
Tour de Suisse: 1st King of the Mountains, winner 1 stage
1935
Tour de France:

Winner Stage 7

1937
Tour de France:

4th overall
Winner Stage 13A
