= List of teams and cyclists in the 1935 Tour de France =

List of cyclists

As was the custom since 1930, the 1935 Tour de France was contested by national teams. Belgium, Italy, Spain, Germany and France each sent teams of 8 cyclists. Then there were the individuals: each country also sent four cyclists who rode as individuals, but could take over the place of another cyclists if they dropped out. Spain only sent three cyclists, and Swiss sent four individual cyclists even though they did not have a national team, so 23 individual cyclists were racing. Finally, there was the touriste-routiers category, in which 30 cyclists participated. In total this made 93 cyclists. Split up by nationality, there were 41 French, 13 Italian, 12 Belgian, 12 German, 11 Spanish and 4 Swiss cyclists.

The French team looked very strong, as it contained the three winners of the last five Tours, Antonin Magne, Georges Speicher and André Leducq, in addition to climber René Vietto and Maurice Archambaud, who had led the general classification for a long time in 1933. In addition, they had Roger Lapébie and Charles Pélissier riding as individuals, which meant that they could take the place of a French team member dropping out.

Of the other teams, the Belgian and Italian teams seemed most likely to challenge the French.

== By rider ==
Legend
No.	Starting number worn by the rider during the Tour
Pos.	Position in the general classification
DNF	Denotes a rider who did not finish

No.	Name	Nationality	Team	Pos.	Ref
1	Jean Aerts	Belgium	Belgium	29	
2	Gustave Danneels	Belgium	Belgium	DNF	
3	Edgard De Caluwé	Belgium	Belgium	DNF	
4	Henri Garnier	Belgium	Belgium	DNF	
5	Louis Hardiquest	Belgium	Belgium	DNF	
6	Romain Maes	Belgium	Belgium	1	
7	Jozef Moerenhout	Belgium	Belgium	DNF	
8	Félicien Vervaecke	Belgium	Belgium	3	
9	Vasco Bergamaschi	Italy	Italy	DNF	
10	Giuseppe Martano	Italy	Italy	DNF	
11	Remo Bertoni	Italy	Italy	DNF	
12	Raffaele di Paco	Italy	Italy	DNF	
13	Francesco Camusso	Italy	Italy	DNF	
14	Mario Cipriani	Italy	Italy	DNF	
15	Adriano Vignoli	Italy	Italy	DNF	
16	Luigi Giacobbe	Italy	Italy	DNF	
17	Fédérico Ezquerra	Spain	Spain	DNF	
18	Mariano Cañardo	Spain	Spain	DNF	
19	Vicente Trueba	Spain	Spain	DNF	
20	Antonio Prior	Spain	Spain	32	
21	Emiliano Alvarez	Spain	Spain	DNF	
22	Cipriano Elis	Spain	Spain	DNF	
23	Salvador Cardona	Spain	Spain	22	
24	Isidro Figueras	Spain	Spain	DNF	
25	Kurt Stöpel	Germany	Germany	DNF	
26	Oskar Thierbach	Germany	Germany	10	
27	Willy Kutschbach	Germany	Germany	46	
28	Georg Umbenhauer	Germany	Germany	DNF	
29	Otto Weckerling	Germany	Germany	42	
30	Anton Hodey	Germany	Germany	DNF	
31	Emil Kijewski	Germany	Germany	DNF	
32	Karl Heide	Germany	Germany	DNF	
33	André Leducq	France	France	17	
34	Georges Speicher	France	France	6	
35	René Le Grevès	France	France	15	
36	Antonin Magne	France	France	DNF	
37	Maurice Archambaud	France	France	7	
38	René Vietto	France	France	8	
39	Jules Merviel	France	France	DNF	
40	René Debenne	France	France	DNF	
51	Sylvère Maes	Belgium	Belgium Individuals	4	
52	Antoon Dignef	Belgium	Belgium Individuals	20	
53	Jules Lowie	Belgium	Belgium Individuals	5	
54	François Neuville	Belgium	Belgium Individuals	DNF	
55	Pietro Rimoldi	Italy	Italy Individuals	DNF	
56	Ambrogio Morelli	Italy	Italy Individuals	2	
57	Eugenio Gestri	Italy	Italy Individuals	DNF	
58	Orlando Teani	Italy	Italy Individuals	27	
59	Demetrio Vicente	Spain	Spain Individuals	DNF	
60	Francisco Cepeda	Spain	Spain Individuals	DNF	
61	Vicente Bachero	Spain	Spain Individuals	39	
63	Ferdi Ickes	Germany	Germany Individuals	45	
64	Bruno Roth	Germany	Germany Individuals	23	
65	Georges Haendel	Germany	Germany Individuals	34	
66	Georg Stach	Germany	Germany Individuals	DNF	
67	Jean Fontenay	France	France Individuals	25	
68	Julien Moineau	France	France Individuals	30	
69	Roger Lapébie	France	France Individuals	DNF	
70	Charles Pélissier	France	France Individuals	13	
71	Leo Amberg	Switzerland	Switzerland Individuals	24	
72	Fritz Hartmann	Switzerland	Switzerland Individuals	26	
73	Alfred Bula	Switzerland	Switzerland Individuals	DNF	
74	Kurt Stettler	Switzerland	Switzerland Individuals	40	
101	Louis Thiétard	France	Touriste-routier	36	
102	Oreste Bernardoni	France	Touriste-routier	35	
103	Paul-René Corallini	France	Touriste-routier	DNF	
104	Georges Lachat	France	Touriste-routier	38	
105	Aimable Denhez	France	Touriste-routier	DNF	
106	Arthur Debruycker	France	Touriste-routier	DNF	
107	Honoré Granier	France	Touriste-routier	28	
108	Benoît Faure	France	Touriste-routier	12	
109	Sezny Leroux	France	Touriste-routier	DNF	
110	Charles Berty	France	Touriste-routier	37	
111	Clément Bistagne	France	Touriste-routier	DNF	
112	Maurice Kraus	France	Touriste-routier	DNF	
113	Joseph Mauclair	France	Touriste-routier	19	
114	Fernand Fayolle	France	Touriste-routier	16	
115	Maurice Pomarede	France	Touriste-routier	DNF	
116	Dante Gianello	France	Touriste-routier	21	
117	Georges Hubatz	France	Touriste-routier	44	
118	Jean Philip	France	Touriste-routier	DNF	
119	Pierre Cogan	France	Touriste-routier	11	
120	Louis Halbourg	France	Touriste-routier	DNF	
121	Manuel Garcia	France	Touriste-routier	41	
122	Pierre Janvier	France	Touriste-routier	DNF	
123	Gabriel Ruozzi	France	Touriste-routier	9	
124	René Bernard	France	Touriste-routier	14	
125	Pierre-Marie Cloarec	France	Touriste-routier	18	
126	Roland Fleuret	France	Touriste-routier	DNF	
127	Théodore Ladron	France	Touriste-routier	43	
128	Paul Chocque	France	Touriste-routier	31	
129	Robert Renonce	France	Touriste-routier	DNF	
130	Aldo Bertocco	France	Touriste-routier	33	
