= 1935 Tour de France, Stage 1 to Stage 12 =

Cycling race stages

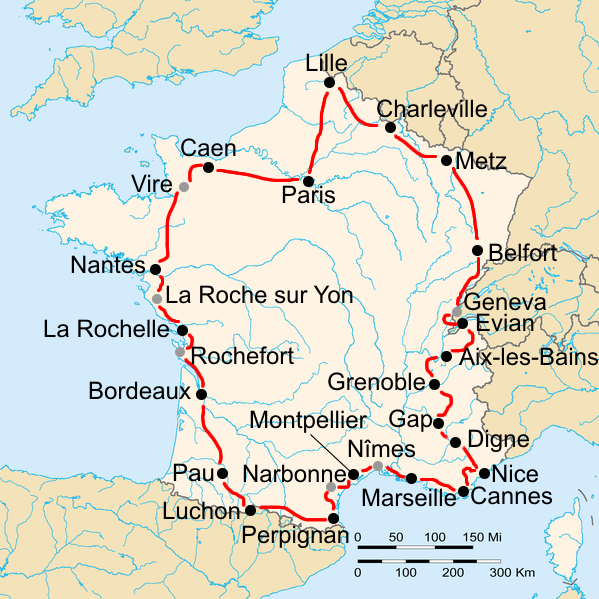
Route of the 1935 Tour de France

The 1935 Tour de France was the 29th edition of the Tour de France, one of cycling's Grand Tours. The Tour began in Paris with a flat stage on 4 July, and Stage 12 occurred on 17 July with a flat stage to Marseille. The race finished in Paris on 28 July.

== Stage 1 ==
4 July 1935 – Paris to Lille, 262 km (163 mi)

Stage 1 result and general classification after stage 1

Rank	Rider	Team	Time
1	Romain Maes (BEL)	Belgium	7h 23' 58"
2	Edgard De Caluwé (BEL)	Belgium	+ 53"
3	Charles Pélissier (FRA)	France Individuals	s.t.
4	Jean Aerts (BEL)	Belgium	s.t.
5	Antonin Magne (FRA)	France	s.t.
6	André Leducq (FRA)	France	+ 2' 20"
7	Jules Merviel (FRA)	France	+ 3' 20"
8	René Bernard (FRA)	Touriste-routier	s.t.
9	Pierre-Marie Cloarec (FRA)	Touriste-routier	s.t.
10	Georges Speicher (FRA)	France	s.t.

== Stage 2 ==
5 July 1935 – Lille to Charleville, 192 km (119 mi)

Stage 2 result

Rank	Rider	Team	Time
1	Charles Pélissier (FRA)	France Individuals	5h 32' 18"
2	Georges Speicher (FRA)	France	s.t.
3	Vasco Bergamaschi (ITA)	Italy	s.t.
4	Gustave Danneels (BEL)	Belgium	s.t.
5	Edgard De Caluwé (BEL)	Belgium	s.t.
6	René Debenne (FRA)	France	s.t.
7	Jules Merviel (FRA)	France	s.t.
8	Remo Bertoni (ITA)	Italy	s.t.
9	Francesco Camusso (ITA)	Italy	s.t.
10	Antonin Magne (FRA)	France	s.t.

General classification after stage 2

Rank	Rider	Team	Time
1	Romain Maes (BEL)	Belgium	
2	Charles Pélissier (FRA)	France Individuals	+ 1' 46"
3	Edgard De Caluwé (BEL)	Belgium	+ 2' 31"
4			
5			
6			
7			
8			
9			
10			

== Stage 3 ==
6 July 1935 – Charleville to Metz, 161 km (100 mi)

Stage 3 result

Rank	Rider	Team	Time
1	Raffaele di Paco (ITA)	Italy	4h 29' 07"
2	Gustave Danneels (BEL)	Belgium	s.t.
3	Maurice Archambaud (FRA)	France	s.t.
4	Jean Aerts (BEL)	Belgium	+ 1' 34"
5	Ambrogio Morelli (ITA)	Italy Individuals	s.t.
6	René Le Grevès (FRA)	France	s.t.
7	Anton Hodey (GER)	Germany	s.t.
8	Emil Kijewski (GER)	Germany	s.t.
9	François Neuville (BEL)	Belgium Individuals	s.t.
10	Edgard De Caluwé (BEL)	Belgium	s.t.

General classification after stage 3

Rank	Rider	Team	Time
1	Romain Maes (BEL)	Belgium	
2	Charles Pélissier (FRA)	France Individuals	+ 1' 46"
3	Edgard De Caluwé (BEL)	Belgium	+ 2' 31"
4			
5			
6			
7			
8			
9			
10			

== Stage 4 ==
7 July 1935 – Metz to Belfort, 220 km (140 mi)

Stage 4 result

Rank	Rider	Team	Time
1	Jean Aerts (BEL)	Belgium	7h 00' 14"
2	Gustave Danneels (BEL)	Belgium	s.t.
3	François Neuville (BEL)	Belgium Individuals	s.t.
4	Oskar Thierbach (GER)	Germany	s.t.
5	Félicien Vervaecke (BEL)	Belgium	s.t.
6	Romain Maes (BEL)	Belgium	+ 10"
7	Vasco Bergamaschi (ITA)	Italy	s.t.
8	Antoon Dignef (BEL)	Belgium Individuals	+ 17"
9	Georg Umbenhauer (GER)	Germany	s.t.
10	Roger Lapébie (FRA)	France Individuals	+ 2' 23"

General classification after stage 4

Rank	Rider	Team	Time
1	Romain Maes (BEL)	Belgium	
2	Antonin Magne (FRA)	France	+ 5' 29"
3	Georges Speicher (FRA)	France	+ 8' 53"
4			
5			
6			
7			
8			
9			
10			

== Stage 5a ==
8 July 1935 – Belfort to Geneva, 262 km (163 mi)

Stage 5a result

Rank	Rider	Team	Time
1	Maurice Archambaud (FRA)	France	8h 21' 22"
2	Edgard De Caluwé (BEL)	Belgium	+ 43"
3	Gustave Danneels (BEL)	Belgium	+ 1' 13"
4	Georg Stach (GER)	Germany Individuals	+ 1' 31"
5	Pietro Rimoldi (ITA)	Italy Individuals	s.t.
6	Ambrogio Morelli (ITA)	Italy Individuals	s.t.
7	François Neuville (BEL)	Belgium Individuals	s.t.
8	Romain Maes (BEL)	Belgium	s.t.
9	Pierre-Marie Cloarec (FRA)	Touriste-routier	s.t.
10	Félicien Vervaecke (BEL)	Belgium	s.t.

General classification after stage 5a

Rank	Rider	Team	Time
1	Romain Maes (BEL)	Belgium	
2	Antonin Magne (FRA)	France	+ 5' 29"
3	Edgard De Caluwé (BEL)	France	+ 6' 44"
4			
5			
6			
7			
8			
9			
10			

== Stage 5b ==
8 July 1935 – Geneva to Evian, 58 km (36 mi) (ITT)

Stage 5b result

Rank	Rider	Team	Time
1	Raffaele di Paco (ITA)	Italy	1h 37' 24"
2	Antonin Magne (FRA)	France	+ 2"
3	Maurice Archambaud (FRA)	France	+ 7"
4	Romain Maes (BEL)	Belgium	+ 40"
5	Joseph Mauclair (FRA)	Touriste-routier	+ 1' 36"
6	René Bernard (FRA)	Touriste-routier	+ 2' 09"
7	Vasco Bergamaschi (ITA)	Italy	+ 2' 12"
8	Jules Lowie (BEL)	Belgium Individuals	+ 2' 26"
9	René Le Grevès (FRA)	France	+ 3' 12"
10	Charles Pélissier (FRA)	France Individuals	+ 4' 12"

General classification after stage 5b

Rank	Rider	Team	Time
1	Romain Maes (BEL)	Belgium	
2	Antonin Magne (FRA)	France	+ 4' 06"
3	Edgard De Caluwé (BEL)	France	+ 11' 04"
4			
5			
6			
7			
8			
9			
10			

== Rest day 1 ==
9 July 1935 – Evian

== Stage 6 ==
10 July 1935 – Evian to Aix-les-Bains, 207 km (129 mi)

Stage 6 result

Rank	Rider	Team	Time
1	René Vietto (FRA)	France	6h 23' 42"
2	René Le Grevès (FRA)	France	+ 3' 50"
3	Vasco Bergamaschi (ITA)	Italy	s.t.
4	Ambrogio Morelli (ITA)	Italy Individuals	s.t.
5	Romain Maes (BEL)	Belgium	s.t.
6	Georges Speicher (FRA)	France	s.t.
7	François Neuville (BEL)	Belgium Individuals	s.t.
8	Jules Lowie (BEL)	Belgium Individuals	s.t.
9	Dante Gianello (FRA)	Touriste-routier	s.t.
10	Charles Berty (FRA)	Touriste-routier	s.t.

General classification after stage 6

Rank	Rider	Team	Time
1	Romain Maes (BEL)	Belgium	
2	Antonin Magne (FRA)	France	+ 4' 06"
3	Vasco Bergamaschi (ITA)	Italy	+ 12' 05"
4			
5			
6			
7			
8			
9			
10			

== Stage 7 ==
11 July 1935 – Aix-les-Bains to Grenoble, 229 km (142 mi)

Stage 7 result

Rank	Rider	Team	Time
1	Francesco Camusso (ITA)	Italy	7h 33' 13"
2	Ambrogio Morelli (ITA)	Italy Individuals	+ 3' 48"
3	Gabriel Ruozzi (FRA)	Touriste-routier	s.t.
4	Vasco Bergamaschi (ITA)	Italy	+ 9' 57"
5	Romain Maes (BEL)	Belgium	s.t.
6	Félicien Vervaecke (BEL)	Belgium	+ 13' 12"
7	René Vietto (FRA)	France	s.t.
8	Paul Chocque (FRA)	Touriste-routier	s.t.
9	Dante Gianello (FRA)	Touriste-routier	+ 13' 23"
10	Georges Speicher (FRA)	France	+ 14' 06"

General classification after stage 7

Rank	Rider	Team	Time
1	Romain Maes (BEL)	Belgium	
2	Vasco Bergamaschi (ITA)	Italy	+ 12' 05"
3	Ambrogio Morelli (ITA)	Italy Individuals	+ 14' 19"
4			
5			
6			
7			
8			
9			
10			

== Stage 8 ==
12 July 1935 – Grenoble to Gap, 102 km (63 mi)

Stage 8 result

Rank	Rider	Team	Time
1	Jean Aerts (BEL)	Belgium	3h 24' 07"
2	Gabriel Ruozzi (FRA)	Touriste-routier	s.t.
3	Félicien Vervaecke (BEL)	Belgium	+ 8"
4	Georges Speicher (FRA)	France	+ 1' 36"
5	Jules Lowie (BEL)	Belgium Individuals	+ 1' 47"
6	Pierre-Marie Cloarec (FRA)	Touriste-routier	+ 2' 11"
7	Maurice Archambaud (FRA)	France	s.t.
8	Francesco Camusso (ITA)	Italy	+ 3' 03"
9	Jean Fontenay (FRA)	France Individuals	+ 3' 55"
10	René Vietto (FRA)	France	+ 4' 01"

General classification after stage 8

Rank	Rider	Team	Time
1	Romain Maes (BEL)	Belgium	
2	Vasco Bergamaschi (ITA)	Italy	+ 13' 07"
3	Ambrogio Morelli (ITA)	Italy Individuals	+ 14' 19"
4			
5			
6			
7			
8			
9			
10			

== Stage 9 ==
13 July 1935 – Gap to Digne, 227 km (141 mi)

Stage 9 result

Rank	Rider	Team	Time
1	René Vietto (FRA)	France	8h 01' 27"
2	Francesco Camusso (ITA)	Italy	+ 7"
3	Félicien Vervaecke (BEL)	Belgium	+ 2' 23"
4	Georges Speicher (FRA)	France	+ 3' 07"
5	Ambrogio Morelli (ITA)	Italy Individuals	s.t.
6	Benoît Faure (FRA)	Touriste-routier	s.t.
7	Leo Amberg (SUI)	Switzerland Individuals	s.t.
8	Maurice Archambaud (FRA)	France	s.t.
9	Fernand Fayolle (FRA)	Touriste-routier	s.t.
10	Jules Lowie (BEL)	Belgium Individuals	+ 3' 20"

General classification after stage 9

Rank	Rider	Team	Time
1	Romain Maes (BEL)	Belgium	
2	Francesco Camusso (ITA)	Italy	+ 3' 31"
3	Ambrogio Morelli (ITA)	Italy Individuals	+ 6' 55"
4			
5			
6			
7			
8			
9			
10			

== Stage 10 ==
14 July 1935 – Digne to Nice, 156 km (97 mi)

Stage 10 result

Rank	Rider	Team	Time
1	Jean Aerts (BEL)	Belgium	4h 22' 35"
2	Roger Lapébie (FRA)	France Individuals	s.t.
3	Gabriel Ruozzi (FRA)	Touriste-routier	s.t.
4	René Le Grevès (FRA)	France	s.t.
5	Georges Speicher (FRA)	France	+ 10"
6	Ambrogio Morelli (ITA)	Italy Individuals	+ 2' 28"
7	Charles Pélissier (FRA)	France Individuals	s.t.
8	Orlando Teani (ITA)	Italy Individuals	s.t.
9	Romain Maes (BEL)	Belgium	s.t.
10	Francesco Camusso (ITA)	Italy	s.t.

General classification after stage 10

Rank	Rider	Team	Time
1	Romain Maes (BEL)	Belgium	
2	Francesco Camusso (ITA)	Italy	+ 3' 31"
3	Georges Speicher (FRA)	France	+ 5' 08"
4			
5			
6			
7			
8			
9			
10			

== Rest day 2 ==
15 July 1935 – Nice

== Stage 11 ==
16 July 1935 – Nice to Cannes, 126 km (78 mi)

Stage 11 result

Rank	Rider	Team	Time
1	Romain Maes (BEL)	Belgium	4h 24' 53"
2	Sylvère Maes (BEL)	Belgium Individuals	+ 35"
3	Francesco Camusso (ITA)	Italy	s.t.
4	Orlando Teani (ITA)	Italy Individuals	+ 57"
5	Ambrogio Morelli (ITA)	Italy Individuals	+ 2' 18"
6	Roger Lapébie (FRA)	France Individuals	+ 2' 27"
7	Gabriel Ruozzi (FRA)	Touriste-routier	+ 2' 33"
8	Georges Speicher (FRA)	France	+ 3' 11"
9	Maurice Archambaud (FRA)	France	s.t.
10	Leo Amberg (SUI)	Switzerland Individuals	s.t.

General classification after stage 11

Rank	Rider	Team	Time
1	Romain Maes (BEL)	Belgium	
2	Francesco Camusso (ITA)	Italy	+ 6' 11"
3	Georges Speicher (FRA)	France	+ 10' 24"
4			
5			
6			
7			
8			
9			
10			

== Stage 12 ==
17 July 1935 – Cannes to Marseille, 195 km (121 mi)

Stage 12 result

Rank	Rider	Team	Time
1	Charles Pélissier (FRA)	France Individuals	6h 03' 02"
2	Honoré Granier (FRA)	Touriste-routier	s.t.
3	Joseph Mauclair (FRA)	Touriste-routier	+ 18' 02"
4	Sylvère Maes (BEL)	Belgium Individuals	s.t.
5	Pietro Rimoldi (ITA)	Italy Individuals	s.t.
=6	Maurice Archambaud (FRA)	France	s.t.
=6	Jules Lowie (BEL)	Belgium Individuals	s.t.
=6	Oskar Thierbach (GER)	Germany	s.t.
=6	Charles Berty (FRA)	Touriste-routier	s.t.
=6	Bruno Roth (GER)	Germany	s.t.

General classification after stage 12

Rank	Rider	Team	Time
1	Romain Maes (BEL)	Belgium	
2	Francesco Camusso (ITA)	Italy	+ 6' 11"
3	Georges Speicher (FRA)	France	+ 10' 24"
4			
5			
6			
7			
8			
9			
10			
