= 1935 Tour de France, Stage 13a to Stage 21 =

Cycling race stages

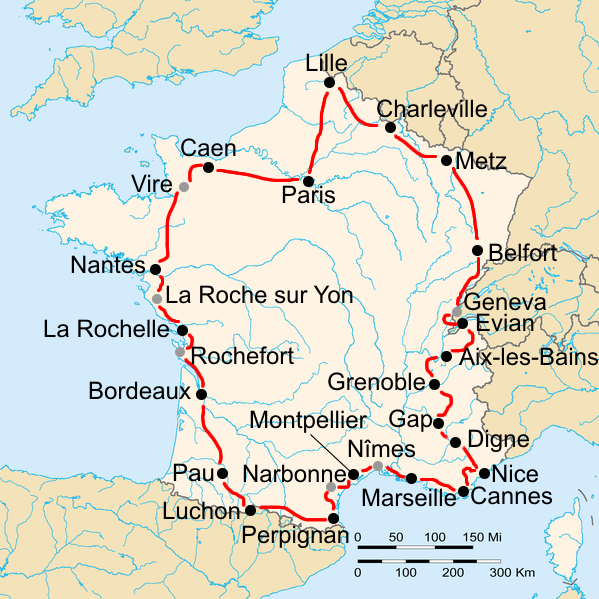
Route of the 1935 Tour de France

The 1935 Tour de France was the 29th edition of the Tour de France, one of cycling's Grand Tours. The Tour began in Paris with a flat stage on 4 July, and Stage 13a occurred on 18 July with a flat stage from Marseille. The race finished in Paris on 28 July.

== Stage 13a ==
18 July 1935 – Marseille to Nîmes, 112 km (70 mi)

Stage 13a result

Rank	Rider	Team	Time
1	Vasco Bergamaschi (ITA)	Italy	4h 09' 16"
2	Félicien Vervaecke (BEL)	Belgium	+ 2' 46"
3	Jules Lowie (BEL)	Belgium Individuals	s.t.
4	Jean Aerts (BEL)	Belgium	+ 6' 38"
5	Louis Thiétard (FRA)	Touriste-routier	s.t.
6	Joseph Mauclair (FRA)	Touriste-routier	s.t.
=7	Louis Hardiquest (BEL)	Belgium	s.t.
=7	Romain Maes (BEL)	Belgium	s.t.
=7	Francesco Camusso (ITA)	Italy	s.t.
=7	Luigi Giacobbe (ITA)	Italy	s.t.

General classification after stage 13a

Rank	Rider	Team	Time
1	Romain Maes (BEL)	Belgium	
2	Francesco Camusso (ITA)	Italy	+ 6' 11"
3	Georges Speicher (FRA)	France	+ 10' 24"
4			
5			
6			
7			
8			
9			
10			

== Stage 13b ==
18 July 1935 – Nîmes to Montpellier, 56 km (35 mi) (ITT)

Stage 13b result

Rank	Rider	Team	Time
1	Georges Speicher (FRA)	France	1h 16' 04"
2	René Vietto (FRA)	France	s.t.
3	Maurice Archambaud (FRA)	France	s.t.
4	André Leducq (FRA)	France	s.t.
5	Jean Fontenay (FRA)	France Individuals	s.t.
6	Julien Moineau (FRA)	France Individuals	s.t.
7	Romain Maes (BEL)	Belgium	+ 27"
8	Sylvère Maes (BEL)	Belgium Individuals	s.t.
9	Félicien Vervaecke (BEL)	Belgium	s.t.
10	Louis Hardiquest (BEL)	Belgium	+ 37"

General classification after stage 13b

Rank	Rider	Team	Time
1	Romain Maes (BEL)	Belgium	
2	Francesco Camusso (ITA)	Italy	+ 7' 14"
3	Georges Speicher (FRA)	France	+ 8' 27"
4			
5			
6			
7			
8			
9			
10			

== Stage 14a ==
19 July 1935 – Montpellier to Narbonne, 103 km (64 mi)

Stage 14a result

Rank	Rider	Team	Time
1	René Le Grevès (FRA)	France	3h 55' 12"
2	Jean Aerts (BEL)	Belgium	s.t.
3	Charles Pélissier (FRA)	France Individuals	s.t.
4	Georges Speicher (FRA)	France	s.t.
=5	Romain Maes (BEL)	Belgium	s.t.
=5	Félicien Vervaecke (BEL)	Belgium	s.t.
=5	Jules Lowie (BEL)	Belgium Individuals	s.t.
=5	Sylvère Maes (BEL)	Belgium Individuals	s.t.
=5	Antoon Dignef (BEL)	Belgium Individuals	s.t.
=5	Louis Hardiquest (BEL)	Belgium	s.t.

General classification after stage 14a

Rank	Rider	Team	Time
1	Romain Maes (BEL)	Belgium	
2	Francesco Camusso (ITA)	Italy	+ 7' 14"
3	Georges Speicher (FRA)	France	+ 8' 27"
4			
5			
6			
7			
8			
9			
10			

== Stage 14b ==
19 July 1935 – Narbonne to Perpignan, 63 km (39 mi) (ITT)

Stage 14b result

Rank	Rider	Team	Time
1	Maurice Archambaud (FRA)	France	1h 39' 08"
2	Romain Maes (BEL)	Belgium	+ 2' 51"
3	Georges Speicher (FRA)	France	+ 4' 01"
4	Ambrogio Morelli (ITA)	Italy Individuals	+ 4' 04"
5	Vasco Bergamaschi (ITA)	Italy	+ 4' 15"
6	André Leducq (FRA)	France	+ 4' 18"
7	Benoît Faure (FRA)	Touriste-routier	+ 4' 49"
8	Jules Lowie (BEL)	Belgium Individuals	+ 5' 53"
9	René Vietto (FRA)	France	+ 6' 02"
10	Georg Umbenhauer (GER)	Germany	+ 6' 04"

General classification after stage 14b

Rank	Rider	Team	Time
1	Romain Maes (BEL)	Belgium	
2	Georges Speicher (FRA)	France	+ 10' 22"
3	Francesco Camusso (ITA)	Italy	+ 12' 30"
4			
5			
6			
7			
8			
9			
10			

== Stage 15 ==
20 July 1935 – Perpignan to Luchon, 325 km (202 mi)

Stage 15 result

Rank	Rider	Team	Time
1	Sylvère Maes (BEL)	Belgium Individuals	11h 39' 23"
2	Félicien Vervaecke (BEL)	Belgium	s.t.
3	Oskar Thierbach (GER)	Germany	+ 13' 35"
4	René Vietto (FRA)	France	+ 20' 05"
5	Ambrogio Morelli (ITA)	Italy Individuals	s.t.
6	Romain Maes (BEL)	Belgium	s.t.
7	Orlando Teani (ITA)	Italy Individuals	s.t.
8	Maurice Archambaud (FRA)	France	s.t.
9	Georg Umbenhauer (GER)	Germany	s.t.
10	Gabriel Ruozzi (FRA)	Touriste-routier	s.t.

General classification after stage 15

Rank	Rider	Team	Time
1	Romain Maes (BEL)	Belgium	
2	Félicien Vervaecke (BEL)	Belgium	+ 9' 07"
3	Sylvère Maes (BEL)	Belgium Individuals	+ 13' 22"
4			
5			
6			
7			
8			
9			
10			

== Rest day 3 ==
21 July 1935 – Luchon

== Stage 16 ==
22 July 1935 – Luchon to Pau, 194 km (121 mi)

Stage 16 result

Rank	Rider	Team	Time
1	Ambrogio Morelli (ITA)	Italy Individuals	7h 12' 22"
2	Orlando Teani (ITA)	Italy Individuals	+ 5' 10"
3	Félicien Vervaecke (BEL)	Belgium	+ 6' 19"
4	Romain Maes (BEL)	Belgium	s.t.
5	Jules Lowie (BEL)	Belgium Individuals	+ 8' 46"
6	Sylvère Maes (BEL)	Belgium Individuals	+ 10' 59"
7	Georges Speicher (FRA)	France	s.t.
8	Maurice Archambaud (FRA)	France	+ 15' 32"
9	Paul Chocque (FRA)	Touriste-routier	s.t.
10	René Vietto (FRA)	France	+ 19' 08"

General classification after stage 16

Rank	Rider	Team	Time
1	Romain Maes (BEL)	Belgium	
2	Ambrogio Morelli (ITA)	Italy Individuals	+ 2' 30"
3	Félicien Vervaecke (BEL)	Belgium	+ 9' 07"
4			
5			
6			
7			
8			
9			
10			

== Rest day 4 ==
23 July 1935 – Pau

== Stage 17 ==
24 July 1935 – Pau to Bordeaux, 224 km (139 mi)

Stage 17 result

Rank	Rider	Team	Time
1	Julien Moineau (FRA)	France Individuals	7h 34' 30"
2	Jean Aerts (BEL)	Belgium	+ 15' 33"
3	André Leducq (FRA)	France	s.t.
4	Charles Pélissier (FRA)	France Individuals	s.t.
5	Georges Lachat (FRA)	Touriste-routier	s.t.
6	Joseph Mauclair (FRA)	Touriste-routier	s.t.
7	Leo Amberg (SUI)	Switzerland Individuals	s.t.
8	Vicente Bachero (ESP)	Spain Individuals	s.t.
9	Paul Chocque (FRA)	Touriste-routier	s.t.
10	Romain Maes (BEL)	Belgium	s.t.

General classification after stage 17

Rank	Rider	Team	Time
1	Romain Maes (BEL)	Belgium	
2	Ambrogio Morelli (ITA)	Italy Individuals	+ 2' 30"
3	Félicien Vervaecke (BEL)	Belgium	+ 9' 07"
4			
5			
6			
7			
8			
9			
10			

== Stage 18a ==
25 July 1935 – Bordeaux to Rochefort, 158 km (98 mi)

Stage 18a result

Rank	Rider	Team	Time
1	René Le Grevès (FRA)	France	4h 17' 51"
2	Jean Aerts (BEL)	Belgium	s.t.
3	Charles Pélissier (FRA)	France Individuals	s.t.
4	Georg Stach (GER)	Germany Individuals	s.t.
5	Joseph Mauclair (FRA)	Touriste-routier	s.t.
6	Gabriel Ruozzi (FRA)	Touriste-routier	s.t.
7	Antoon Dignef (BEL)	Belgium Individuals	s.t.
8	Romain Maes (BEL)	Belgium	s.t.
9	Maurice Archambaud (FRA)	France	+ 3' 35"
10	René Bernard (FRA)	Touriste-routier	+ 5' 18"

General classification after stage 18a

Rank	Rider	Team	Time
1	Romain Maes (BEL)	Belgium	
2	Ambrogio Morelli (ITA)	Italy Individuals	+ 12' 47"
3	Félicien Vervaecke (BEL)	Belgium	+ 19' 24"
4			
5			
6			
7			
8			
9			
10			

== Stage 18b ==
25 July 1935 – Rochefort to La Rochelle, 33 km (21 mi) (ITT)

Stage 18b result

Rank	Rider	Team	Time
1	André Leducq (FRA)	France	52' 19"
2	Romain Maes (BEL)	Belgium	+ 7"
3	Sylvère Maes (BEL)	Belgium Individuals	+ 9"
4	Jules Lowie (BEL)	Belgium Individuals	+ 12"
5	Manuel Garcia (FRA)	Touriste-routier	+ 1' 11"
6	Aldo Bertocco (FRA)	Touriste-routier	s.t.
7	Charles Pélissier (FRA)	France Individuals	+ 1' 37"
8	Ambrogio Morelli (ITA)	Italy Individuals	+ 1' 56"
9	Pierre-Marie Cloarec (FRA)	Touriste-routier	+ 2' 06"
10	Paul Chocque (FRA)	Touriste-routier	+ 2' 07"

General classification after stage 18b

Rank	Rider	Team	Time
1	Romain Maes (BEL)	Belgium	
2	Ambrogio Morelli (ITA)	Italy Individuals	+ 15' 21"
3	Félicien Vervaecke (BEL)	Belgium	+ 23' 58"
4			
5			
6			
7			
8			
9			
10			

== Stage 19a ==
26 July 1935 – La Rochelle to La Roche-sur-Yon, 81 km (50 mi)

Stage 19a result

Rank	Rider	Team	Time
1	René Le Grevès (FRA)	France	2h 54' 51"
2	Jean Aerts (BEL)	Belgium	s.t.
3	Charles Pélissier (FRA)	France Individuals	s.t.
4	Georges Lachat (FRA)	Touriste-routier	s.t.
5	Théodore Ladron (FRA)	Touriste-routier	s.t.
6	Leo Amberg (SUI)	Switzerland Individuals	s.t.
7	Orlando Teani (ITA)	Italy Individuals	s.t.
8	Oreste Bernardoni (FRA)	Touriste-routier	s.t.
=9	Romain Maes (BEL)	Belgium	s.t.
=9	Antoon Dignef (BEL)	Belgium Individuals	s.t.

General classification after stage 19a

Rank	Rider	Team	Time
1	Romain Maes (BEL)	Belgium	
2	Ambrogio Morelli (ITA)	Italy Individuals	+ 15' 21"
3	Félicien Vervaecke (BEL)	Belgium	+ 23' 58"
4			
5			
6			
7			
8			
9			
10			

== Stage 19b ==
26 July 1935 – La Roche-sur-Yon to Nantes, 95 km (59 mi) (ITT)

Stage 19b result

Rank	Rider	Team	Time
1	Jean Aerts (BEL)	Belgium	2h 45' 47"
2	Félicien Vervaecke (BEL)	Belgium	s.t.
3	Romain Maes (BEL)	Belgium	s.t.
4	Sylvère Maes (BEL)	Belgium Individuals	s.t.
5	Jules Lowie (BEL)	Belgium Individuals	s.t.
6	Kurt Stettler (SUI)	Switzerland Individuals	s.t.
7	Fritz Hartmann (SUI)	Switzerland Individuals	+ 1' 01"
8	Ambrogio Morelli (ITA)	Italy Individuals	+ 3' 43"
9	Otto Weckerling (GER)	Germany	s.t.
10	Orlando Teani (ITA)	Italy Individuals	s.t.

General classification after stage 19b

Rank	Rider	Team	Time
1	Romain Maes (BEL)	Belgium	
2	Ambrogio Morelli (ITA)	Italy Individuals	+ 19' 04"
3	Félicien Vervaecke (BEL)	Belgium	+ 23' 13"
4			
5			
6			
7			
8			
9			
10			

== Stage 20a ==
27 July 1935 – Nantes to Vire, 220 km (140 mi)

Stage 20a result

Rank	Rider	Team	Time
1	René Le Grevès (FRA)	France	8h 33' 13"
2	Charles Pélissier (FRA)	France Individuals	s.t.
3	Aldo Bertocco (FRA)	Touriste-routier	s.t.
4	Ambrogio Morelli (ITA)	Italy Individuals	s.t.
5	Orlando Teani (ITA)	Italy Individuals	s.t.
6	Georges Lachat (FRA)	Touriste-routier	s.t.
7	Louis Thiétard (FRA)	Touriste-routier	s.t.
8	Gabriel Ruozzi (FRA)	Touriste-routier	s.t.
9	Maurice Archambaud (FRA)	France	s.t.
10	Vicente Bachero (ESP)	Spain Individuals	s.t.

General classification after stage 20a

Rank	Rider	Team	Time
1	Romain Maes (BEL)	Belgium	
2	Ambrogio Morelli (ITA)	Italy Individuals	+ 17' 54"
3	Félicien Vervaecke (BEL)	Belgium	+ 22' 03"
4			
5			
6			
7			
8			
9			
10			

== Stage 20b ==
27 July 1935 – Vire to Caen, 55 km (34 mi) (ITT)

Stage 20b result

Rank	Rider	Team	Time
1	Ambrogio Morelli (ITA)	Italy Individuals	1h 25' 19"
2	Otto Weckerling (GER)	Germany	s.t.
3	Orlando Teani (ITA)	Italy Individuals	s.t.
4	Oskar Thierbach (GER)	Germany	s.t.
5	René Le Grevès (FRA)	France	+ 1' 15"
6	Charles Pélissier (FRA)	France Individuals	s.t.
7	René Vietto (FRA)	France	s.t.
8	Julien Moineau (FRA)	France Individuals	s.t.
9	Jean Fontenay (FRA)	France Individuals	s.t.
10	André Leducq (FRA)	France	s.t.

General classification after stage 20b

Rank	Rider	Team	Time
1	Romain Maes (BEL)	Belgium	
2	Ambrogio Morelli (ITA)	Italy Individuals	+ 15' 04"
3	Félicien Vervaecke (BEL)	Belgium	+ 22' 03"
4			
5			
6			
7			
8			
9			
10			

== Stage 21 ==
28 July 1935 – Caen to Paris, 221 km (137 mi)

Stage 21 result

Rank	Rider	Team	Time
1	Romain Maes (BEL)	Belgium	6h 57' 45"
2	Félicien Vervaecke (BEL)	Belgium	+ 39"
3	Ambrogio Morelli (ITA)	Italy Individuals	s.t.
4	Paul Chocque (FRA)	Touriste-routier	s.t.
5	René Le Grevès (FRA)	France	+ 4' 52"
6	Charles Pélissier (FRA)	France Individuals	s.t.
7	Jean Aerts (BEL)	Belgium	s.t.
8	Georges Lachat (FRA)	Touriste-routier	s.t.
=9	Antonio Prior (ESP)	Spain	s.t.
=9	Salvador Cardona (ESP)	Spain	s.t.

General classification after stage 21

Rank	Rider	Team	Time
1	Romain Maes (BEL)	Belgium	141h 32' 00"
2	Ambrogio Morelli (ITA)	Italy Individuals	+ 17' 52"
3	Félicien Vervaecke (BEL)	Belgium	+ 24' 06"
4	Sylvère Maes (BEL)	Belgium Individuals	+ 35' 24"
5	Jules Lowie (BEL)	Belgium Individuals	+ 51' 26"
6	Georges Speicher (FRA)	France	+ 54' 29"
7	Maurice Archambaud (FRA)	France	+ 1h 09' 28"
8	René Vietto (FRA)	France	+ 1h 21' 03"
9	Gabriel Ruozzi (FRA)	Touriste-routier	+ 1h 34' 02"
10	Oskar Thierbach (GER)	Germany	+ 2h 00' 04"
