= 1932 UCI Road World Championships – Men's road race =

Men's Individual Road Race
1932 UCI Road World Championships
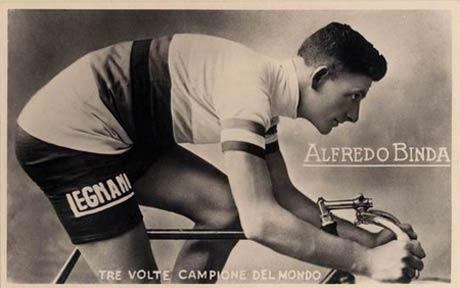
- Later picture of Binda with his third rainbow jersey

Race details
- Dates: 31 August 1932
- Stages: 1
- Distance: 206.1 km (128.1 mi)
- Winning time: 7h 01' 28"

Results
	Winner	Alfredo Binda (ITA)	(Italy)
	Second	Remo Bertoni (ITA)	(Italy)
	Third	Nicolas Frantz (LUX)	(Luxembourg)

The men's road race at the 1932 UCI Road World Championships was the sixth edition of the event. The race took place on Wednesday 31 August 1932 in Rome, Italy. The race was won by Alfredo Binda of Italy.

== Race report ==
The professionals had to complete three laps of about 68 kilometres, totalling 206 kilometres. There were 21 participants. Still, only a maximum of three cyclists per country were allowed to participate. The strong Italian team was the favourite and took the first two places. Alfredo Binda became world champion for the third time ahead of his compatriot Remo Bertoni. They were well ahead of Luxembourger Nicolas Frantz.

== Final classification ==
General classification (1–10)

Rank	Rider	Time
1st place, gold medalist(s)	Alfredo Binda (ITA)	7h 01' 28"
2nd place, silver medalist(s)	Remo Bertoni (ITA)	+ 15"
3rd place, bronze medalist(s)	Nicolas Frantz (LUX)	+ 4' 52"
4	Ricardo Montero (ESP)	+ 5' 15"
5	Learco Guerra (ITA)	+ 5' 39"
6	Marinus Valentijn (NED)	+ 6' 20"
7	Janus Braspennincx (NED)	+ 6' 20"
8	Alfred Haemerlinck (BEL)	+ 6' 56"
9	André Godinat (FRA)	+ 9' 44"
10	Romain Gijssels (BEL)	+ 9' 44"
