= 1934 Paris–Nice =

Race details
- Dates: 7–11 March 1934
- Stages: 5
- Distance: 1,178 km (732.0 mi)
- Winning time: 33h 47' 06"

Results
| | Winner | Gaston Rebry (BEL) |
| | Second | Roger Lapébie (FRA) |
| | Third | Maurice Archambaud (FRA) |

The 1934 Paris–Nice was the second edition of the Paris–Nice cycle race and was held from 7 March to 11 March 1934. The race started in Paris and finished in Nice. The race was won by Gaston Rebry.

== General classification ==
Final general classification

| Rank | Rider | Time |
|---|---|---|
| 1 | Gaston Rebry (BEL) | 33h 47' 06" |
| 2 | Roger Lapébie (FRA) | + 6' 24" |
| 3 | Maurice Archambaud (FRA) | + 8' 45" |
| 4 | Jules Merviel (FRA) | + 11' 18" |
| 5 | Raymond Louviot (FRA) | + 18' 20" |
| 6 | René Vietto (FRA) | + 25' 05" |
| 7 | Edgard De Caluwé (BEL) | + 25' 37" |
| 8 | Georges Speicher (FRA) | + 30' 42" |
| 9 | Léon Level (FRA) | + 30' 45" |
| 10 | Théo Herckenrath (BEL) | + 33' 37" |
