= 1933 UCI Road World Championships – Men's road race =

Men's Individual Road Race
1933 UCI Road World Championships
- Rainbow jersey

Race details
- Dates: 14 August 1933
- Stages: 1
- Distance: 250 km (155.3 mi)
- Winning time: 7h 08' 58"

Results
	Winner	Georges Speicher (FRA)	(France)
	Second	Antonin Magne (FRA)	(France)
	Third	Marinus Valentijn (NED)	(Netherlands)

The men's road race at the 1933 UCI Road World Championships was the seventh edition of the event. The race took place on Monday 14 August 1933 in Montlhéry, France. The race was won by Georges Speicher of France.

== Final classification ==
General classification (1–10)

Rank	Rider	Time
1st place, gold medalist(s)	Georges Speicher (FRA)	7h 08' 58"
2nd place, silver medalist(s)	Antonin Magne (FRA)	+ 5' 03"
3rd place, bronze medalist(s)	Marinus Valentijn (NED)	+ 5' 04"
4	Alfred Haemerlinck (BEL)	+ 11' 03"
5	Alphonse Schepers (BEL)	+ 11' 03"
6	Alfredo Binda (ITA)	+ 11' 03"
7	Mariano Cañardo (ESP)	+ 11' 03"
8	Albert Büchi (SUI)	+ 11' 03"
9	Gerrit van de Ruit (NED)	+ 11' 03"
10	Ludwig Geyer (GER)	+ 11' 03"
