= 1933 Volta a Catalunya =

Race details
- Dates: 10–18 June 1933
- Stages: 9
- Distance: 1,537 km (955.0 mi)
- Winning time: 55h 04' 19"

Results
	Winner	Alfredo Bovet (ITA)
	Second	Ambrogio Morelli (ITA)
	Third	Antoine Dignef (BEL)

The 1933 Volta a Catalunya was the 15th edition of the Volta a Catalunya cycle race and was held from 10 June to 18 June 1933. The race started and finished in Barcelona. The race was won by Alfredo Bovet.

== Route and stages ==
List of stages
Stage	Date	Course	Distance	Winner
1	10 June	Barcelona to Manresa	84 km (52 mi)	Jef Demuysere (BEL)
2	11 June	Manresa to Tortosa	219 km (136 mi)	Alfons Corthout (BEL)
3	12 June	Tortosa to Reus	218 km (135 mi)	Alfredo Bovet (ITA)
4	13 June	Reus to Lleida	131 km (81 mi)	Alfons Corthout (BEL)
5	14 June	Lleida to La Seu d'Urgell	190 km (118 mi)	Ambrogio Morelli (ITA)
6	15 June	La Seu d'Urgell to Girona	212 km (132 mi)	Vicente Trueba (ESP)
7	16 June	Girona to Figueres	130 km (81 mi)	Antoine Dignef (BEL)
8	17 June	Figueres to Caldes de Malavella	179 km (111 mi)	Felice Gremo (ITA)
9	18 June	Caldes de Malavella to Barcelona	175 km (109 mi)	Alfredo Bovet (ITA)
	Total		1,538 km (956 mi)	

== General classification ==
Final general classification

Rank	Rider	Time
1	Alfredo Bovet (ITA)	55h 04' 19"
2	Ambrogio Morelli (ITA)	+ 31' 59"
3	Antoine Dignef (BEL)	+ 34' 57"
4	Vicente Trueba (ESP)	+ 1h 05' 18"
5	Felice Gremo (ITA)	+ 1h 09' 24"
6	Luigi Marchisio (ITA)	+ 1h 25' 51"
7	Fédérico Ezquerra (ESP)	+ 1h 30' 44"
8	Vicente Bachero (ESP)	+ 1h 34' 05"
9	Émile Decroix (BEL)	+ 1h 34' 05"
10	José Nicolau (ESP)	+ 1h 37' 24"
