= 1935 Giro d'Italia =

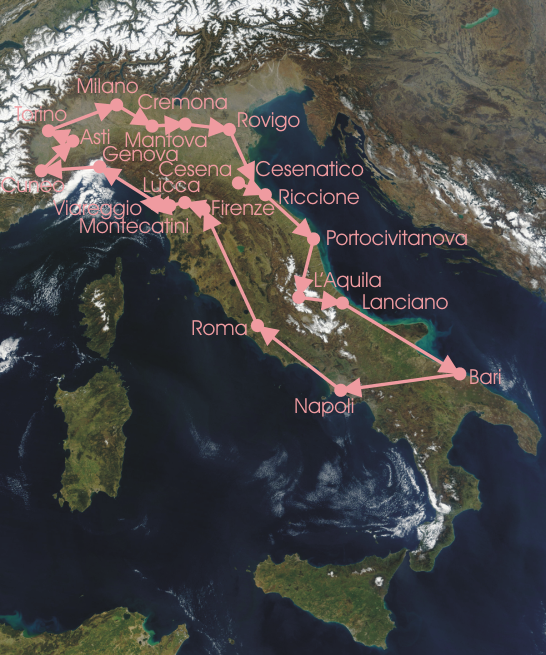
- Race Route

Race details
- Dates: 18 May – 9 June 1935
- Stages: 18, including two split stages
- Distance: 3,577 km (2,223 mi)
- Winning time: 113h 22' 46"

Results
Jersey awarded to the overall winner	Winner	Vasco Bergamaschi (ITA)	(Maino)
	Second	Giuseppe Martano (ITA)	(Fréjus)
	Third	Giuseppe Olmo (ITA)	(Bianchi)
	Mountains	Gino Bartali (ITA)	(Fréjus)
	Team	Fréjus	

The 1935 Giro d'Italia was the 23rd edition of the Giro d'Italia, organized and sponsored by the newspaper La Gazzetta dello Sport. The race began on 18 May in Milan with a stage that stretched 165 km (103 mi) to Cremona, finishing back in Milan on 9 June after a 290 km (180 mi) stage and a total distance covered of 3,577 km (2,223 mi). The race was won by the Italian rider Vasco Bergamaschi of the Maino team, with fellow Italians Giuseppe Martano and Giuseppe Olmo coming in second and third respectively.

This Giro saw the last participation of Alfredo Binda and the first of Gino Bartali, then 20 years old, who won the mountains classification.

== Participants ==
Of the 101 riders that began the Giro d'Italia on 18 May, 62 of them made it to the finish in Milan on 9 June. Riders were allowed to ride on their own or as a member of a team; 55 riders competed as part of a team, while the remaining 46 competed independently. There were eight teams that competed in the race: Bianchi, Dei, Fréjus, Gloria, Helyett, Legnano, and Maino.

The peloton was primarily composed of Italians. The field featured seven former Giro d'Italia champions in five-time winner Alfredo Binda, two-time champion Costante Girardengo, and single race winners, Francesco Camusso, Luigi Marchisio, Antonio Pesenti, Learco Guerra, and Vasco Bergamaschi. Other notable Italian riders that started the race included Giuseppe Olmo, Raffaele Di Paco, Remo Bertoni, and Domenico Piemontesi. French cyclist and two-time Tour de France champion André Leducq entered the Giro d'Italia for the first time in his career. Other notable non-Italian riders included: Maurice Archambaud, Jef Demuysere, and René Vietto.

At the start of this Giro, there were 6 former Giro winners (Girardengo, Marchisio, Camusso, Pesenti, Binda and Guerra), winning in total eleven stages, a record in Giro history. Also present were Bergamaschi and Bartali, making for a total of 15 Giro victories between 1919 and 1946, another record.

== Race summary ==
Bergamaschi won the sprint in the first stage, and became the first leader. The second stage saw an escape by Piemontesi and Fantini; Piemontesi won the stage by a few seconds, and took the pink jersey.

The third stage ended in a bunch sprint won by Guerra, and Piemontesi stayed in the lead. The fourth stage also ended in a bunch sprint won by Guerra, but Piemontesi lost time in that stage, so Fantini inherited the pink jersey.

The first half of the fifth stage was a time trial. Olmo won, and became the new leader, with Bergamaschi in second place. The sixth stage was the pivotal moment of the 1935 Giro: a group escaped, including Bergamaschi and Bartali. Both were not seen as potential Giro winners, but had started this Giro as domestiques for their team captains Girardengo and Martano. The group was given freedom to ride away; afterwards other teams complained that the Giro organisation did not inform them about the margin. At the finish line, Bartali won his first ever Giro stage, and Bergamaschi won enough time to become the new leader in the general classification.

In the stages that followed, Bergamaschi did not crack. Helped by his strong team, he was even able to win some more time, and became the surprise winner of the 1935 Giro.

== Route and stages ==
For the first time, some stages were split in two. The two parts of each split stage were held on the same day, with a short resting time in between.

Stage results
Stage	Date	Course	Distance	Type (Note: In 1935, there was no distinction in the rules between plain stages and mountain stages; the icons shown here indicate that the stages 2, 6, 7, 9, 10, 11, 12, 13a, 14, 15, and 17 included major mountains.)	Winner
1	18 May	Milan to Cremona	165 km (103 mi)	Plain stage	Vasco Bergamaschi (ITA)
2	19 May	Cremona to Mantua	175 km (109 mi)	Stage with mountain(s)	Domenico Piemontesi (ITA)
3	20 May	Mantua to Rovigo	162 km (101 mi)	Plain stage	Learco Guerra (ITA)
4	21 May	Rovigo to Cesenatico	140 km (87 mi)	Plain stage	Learco Guerra (ITA)
5a	22 May	Cesena to Riccione	35 km (22 mi)	Individual time trial	Giuseppe Olmo (ITA)
5b	22 May	Riccione to Portocivitanova	136 km (85 mi)	Plain stage	Antonio Folco (ITA)
	23 May	Rest day			
6	24 May	Portocivitanova to L'Aquila	171 km (106 mi)	Stage with mountain(s)	Gino Bartali (ITA)
7	25 May	L'Aquila to Lanciano	146 km (91 mi)	Stage with mountain(s)	Learco Guerra (ITA)
8	26 May	Lanciano to Bari	308 km (191 mi)	Plain stage	Learco Guerra (ITA)
	27 May	Rest day			
9	28 May	Bari to Naples	333 km (207 mi)	Stage with mountain(s)	Raffaele Di Paco (ITA)
	29 May	Rest day			
10	30 May	Naples to Rome	250 km (155 mi)	Stage with mountain(s)	Learco Guerra (ITA)
11	31 May	Rome to Florence	317 km (197 mi)	Stage with mountain(s)	Vasco Bergamaschi (ITA)
	1 June	Rest day			
12	2 June	Florence to Montecatini Terme	134 km (83 mi)	Stage with mountain(s)	Giuseppe Olmo (ITA)
13a	3 June	Montecatini Terme to Lucca	99 km (62 mi)	Stage with mountain(s)	René Debenne (FRA)
13b	3 June	Lucca to Viareggio	55 km (34 mi)	Individual time trial	Maurice Archambaud (FRA)
14	4 June	Viareggio to Genoa	172 km (107 mi)	Stage with mountain(s)	Raffaele Di Paco (ITA)
	5 June	Rest day			
15	6 June	Genoa to Cuneo	148 km (92 mi)	Stage with mountain(s)	Giuseppe Olmo (ITA)
16	7 June	Cuneo to Asti	91 km (57 mi)	Plain stage	Giuseppe Olmo (ITA)
17	8 June	Asti to Turin	250 km (155 mi)	Stage with mountain(s)	Raffaele Di Paco (ITA)
18	9 June	Turin to Milan	290 km (180 mi)	Plain stage	Raffaele Di Paco (ITA)
	Total		3,577 km (2,223 mi)		

== Classification leadership ==
The leader of the general classification – calculated by adding the stage finish times of each rider – wore a pink jersey. This classification is the most important of the race, and its winner is considered as the winner of the Giro. Time bonuses were removed in the 1935 Giro.

The highest ranked non-Italian cyclist in the general classification and the highest ranked isolati cyclist in the general classification were tracked.

In the mountains classification, the race organizers selected different mountains that the route crossed and awarded points to the riders who crossed them first.

The winner of the team classification was determined by adding the finish times of the best three cyclists per team together and the team with the lowest total time was the winner. If a team had fewer than three riders finish, they were not eligible for the classification.

The rows in the following table correspond to the jerseys awarded after that stage was run.

Stage	Winner	General classification	Best foreign rider	Best isolati rider	Mountains classification	Team classification
1	Vasco Bergamaschi	Vasco Bergamaschi	Adrien Buttafocchi	Armando Zucchini	not awarded	Maino
2	Domenico Piemontesi	Domenico Piemontesi	Adrien Buttafocchi	Armando Zucchini	not awarded	Maino
3	Learco Guerra	Domenico Piemontesi	Adrien Buttafocchi	Armando Zucchini	not awarded	Maino
4	Learco Guerra	Walter Fantini	Adrien Buttafocchi	Armando Zucchini	not awarded	Gloria
5a	Giuseppe Olmo	Giuseppe Olmo	Adrien Buttafocchi	Armando Zucchini	not awarded	Maino
5b	Antonio Folco	Giuseppe Olmo	Adrien Buttafocchi	Armando Zucchini	not awarded	Maino
6	Gino Bartali	Vasco Bergamaschi	René Debenne	Ambrogio Morelli	Gino Bartali	Fréjus
7	Learco Guerra	Vasco Bergamaschi	René Debenne	Ambrogio Morelli	Gino Bartali	Fréjus
8	Learco Guerra	Vasco Bergamaschi	René Debenne	Ambrogio Morelli	Gino Bartali	Fréjus
9	Raffaele Di Paco	Vasco Bergamaschi	René Debenne	Ambrogio Morelli	Gino Bartali	Fréjus
10	Learco Guerra	Vasco Bergamaschi	René Debenne	Ambrogio Morelli	Gino Bartali	Fréjus
11	Vasco Bergamaschi	Vasco Bergamaschi	Maurice Archambaud	Ambrogio Morelli	Gino Bartali	Fréjus
12	Giuseppe Olmo	Vasco Bergamaschi	Maurice Archambaud	Ambrogio Morelli	Gino Bartali	Fréjus
13a	René Debenne	Vasco Bergamaschi	Maurice Archambaud	Ambrogio Morelli	Gino Bartali	Fréjus
13b	Maurice Archambaud	Vasco Bergamaschi	Maurice Archambaud	Ambrogio Morelli	Gino Bartali	Fréjus
14	Raffaele Di Paco	Vasco Bergamaschi	Maurice Archambaud	Ambrogio Morelli	Gino Bartali	Fréjus
15	Giuseppe Olmo	Vasco Bergamaschi	Maurice Archambaud	Ambrogio Morelli	Gino Bartali	Fréjus
16	Giuseppe Olmo	Vasco Bergamaschi	Maurice Archambaud	Ambrogio Morelli	Gino Bartali	Fréjus
17	Raffaele Di Paco	Vasco Bergamaschi	Maurice Archambaud	Ambrogio Morelli	Gino Bartali	Fréjus
18	Raffaele Di Paco	Vasco Bergamaschi	Maurice Archambaud	Ambrogio Morelli	Gino Bartali	Fréjus
Final		Vasco Bergamaschi	Maurice Archambaud	Ambrogio Morelli	Gino Bartali	Fréjus

== Final standings ==
Legend
A pink jersey	Denotes the winner of the General classification
A white jersey	Denotes the winner of the isolated rider classification

=== General classification ===
Final general classification (1–10)
Rank	Name	Team	Time
1	Vasco Bergamaschi (ITA)	Maino	113h 22' 46"
2	Giuseppe Martano (ITA)	Fréjus	+ 3' 07"
3	Giuseppe Olmo (ITA)	Gloria	+ 6' 12"
4	Learco Guerra (ITA)	Maino	+ 7' 22"
5	Maurice Archambaud (FRA)	Dei	+ 9' 19"
6	Remo Bertoni (ITA)	Legnano	+ 9' 46"
7	Gino Bartali (ITA)	Fréjus	+ 9' 46"
8	Ezio Cecchi (ITA)	Gloria	+ 16' 01"
9	Augusto Introzzi (ITA)	Gloria	+ 16' 03"
10	Ambrogio Morelli (ITA)	—	+ 17' 01"

=== Foreign rider classification ===
Final foreign rider classification (1–10)
Rank	Name	Team	Time
1	Maurice Archambaud (FRA)	Dei	113h 32' 02"
2	René Debenne (FRA)	Dei	+ 21' 55"
3	Karl Altenburger (GER)	Fréjus	+ 23' 53"
4	Léon Level (FRA)	Helyett	+ 37' 14"
5	Albert Gabard (FRA)	Helyett	+ 48' 54"
6	Jef Demuysere (BEL)	Bianchi	+ 1h 02' 10"
7	Eugène Le Goff (FRA)	Dei	+ 1h 04' 41"
8	René Bernard (FRA)	Helyett	+ 1h 15' 07"
9	Pierre Cloarec (FRA)	Dei	+ 1h 15' 56"
10	Lucien Lauk (FRA)	Helyett	+ 1h 37' 39"

=== Isolati rider classification ===
Final isolati rider classification (1–10)
Rank	Name	Time
1	Ambrogio Morelli (ITA)	113h 40' 09"
2	Eugenio Gestri (ITA)	+ 2' 03"
3	Cesare Grassi (ITA)	+ 22' 10"
4	Renato Scorticati (ITA)	+ 23' 03"
5	Giovanni Baroni (ITA)	+ 24' 26"
6	Carlo Moretti (ITA)	+ 32' 05"
7	Armando Zucchini (ITA)	+ 32' 40"
8	Carlo Romanatti (ITA)	+ 33' 17"
9	Carlo Oria (ITA)	+ 33' 30"
10	Giovanni Zandonà (ITA)	+ 37' 18"

=== Mountains classification ===
Final mountains classification (1–9)
	Name	Team	Points
1	Gino Bartali (ITA)	Fréjus	44
2	Remo Bertoni (ITA)	Legnano	28
3	Mario Cipriani (ITA)	Fréjus	14
4	Francesco Camusso (ITA)	Legnano	9
5	Giuseppe Martano (ITA)	Fréjus	9
6	Aladino Mealli (ITA)	Legnano	6
7	Vasco Bergamaschi (ITA)	Maino	5
7	Ezio Cecchi (ITA)	Gloria	5
7	Ambrogio Morelli (ITA)	—	5

=== Team classification ===
Final team classification (1–6)
	Team	Time
1	Fréjus	340h 54' 42"
2	Maino	+ 9' 35"
3	Dei	+ 16' 35"
4	Gloria	+ 25' 58"
5	Legnano	+ 27' 30"
6	Helyett	+ 2h 22' 39"
