= Maurice Pomarède =

French cyclist

Personal information
- Born: 22 December 1910
- Died: 26 December 1962 (aged 52)

Cycling career
- Sport: Cycling
- Discipline: Road
- Role: Rider

Maurice Pomarède (22 December 1910 – 26 December 1962) was a French racing cyclist. He rode in the 1935 Tour de France. However, he did not finish the race.
