= Clément Bistagne =

French cyclist

Personal information
- Full name: Clément René Bistagne
- Born: 14 March 1914 Marseille, France
- Died: 16 October 1967 (aged 53)

Cycling career
- Sport: Cycling
- Discipline: Road
- Role: Rider

Clément René Bistagne (14 March 1914 – 16 October 1967) was a French racing cyclist. He rode in the 1935 Tour de France.

Bistagne was a resistance member during the Second World War.
