= 1936 Paris–Roubaix =

Cycling race

Race details
- Dates: 12 April 1936
- Stages: 1
- Distance: 262 km (162.8 mi)
- Winning time: 7h 15' 01"

Results
	Winner	Georges Speicher (FRA)
	Second	Romain Maes (BEL)
	Third	Gaston Rebry (BEL)

The 1936 Paris–Roubaix was the 37th edition of the Paris–Roubaix, a classic one-day cycle race in France. The single day event was held on 12 April 1936 and stretched 262 km (163 mi) from Paris to its end in a velodrome in Roubaix. The winner was Georges Speicher from France.

== Results ==
Final results (1–10)
Rank	Cyclist	Time
1	Georges Speicher (FRA)	7h 15' 01″
2	Romain Maes (BEL)	+0' 00″
3	Gaston Rebry (BEL)	+0' 00″
4	Romain Gijssels (BEL)	+1' 30″
5	Jules Rossi (ITA)	+1' 30″
6	Jean Wauters (BEL)	+1' 30″
7	Frans Bonduel (BEL)	+3' 01″
8	Emiel Vandepitte (BEL)	+3' 01″
9	Sylvain Grysolle (BEL)	+6' 34″
10	Léon Level (FRA)	+6' 34″
