= Robert Renoncé =

French cyclist

Personal information
- Born: 6 August 1912
- Died: 12 December 1991 (aged 79)

Cycling career
- Sport: Cycling
- Discipline: Road
- Role: Rider

Robert Renoncé (6 August 1912 – 12 December 1991) was a French racing cyclist. He rode in the 1935 Tour de France.
