= Karl Heide =

German cyclist

Personal information
- Born: 3 November 1906

Cycling career
- Sport: Cycling
- Discipline: Road
- Role: Rider

Karl Heide (born 3 November 1906, date of death unknown) was a German racing cyclist. He rode in the 1935 Tour de France.
