= Pierre Janvier =

French cyclist

Personal information
- Born: 15 December 1911 Neuilly-sur-Seine, France

Cycling career
- Sport: Cycling
- Discipline: Road
- Role: Rider

Pierre Janvier (born 15 December 1911, date of death unknown) was a French racing cyclist. He rode in the 1935 Tour de France.
