= Aimable Denhez =

French cyclist

Personal information
- Born: 10 September 1914 Reims
- Died: 30 October 1977 (aged 63)

Cycling career
- Sport: Cycling
- Discipline: Road
- Role: Rider

Aimable Denhez (10 September 1914 – 30 October 1977) was a French racing cyclist. He rode in the 1935 Tour de France.
