= Maurice Kraus =

French cyclist

Personal information
- Born: 31 May 1906
- Died: 20 January 1998 (aged 90)

Cycling career
- Sport: Cycling
- Discipline: Road
- Role: Rider

Maurice Kraus (31 May 1906 – 20 January 1998) was a French racing cyclist. He rode in the 1935 Tour de France.
