= Sezny Le Roux =

French cyclist

Personal information
- Born: 18 June 1914
- Died: 29 August 1983 (aged 69)

Cycling career
- Sport: Cycling
- Discipline: Road
- Role: Rider

Sezny Le Roux (18 June 1914 – 29 August 1983) was a French racing cyclist. He rode in the 1935 Tour de France.
