= Roland Fleuret =

French cyclist

Personal information
- Born: 25 December 1912
- Died: 26 December 1995 (aged 83)

Cycling career
- Sport: Cycling
- Discipline: Road
- Role: Rider

Roland Fleuret (25 December 1912 – 26 December 1995) was a French racing cyclist. He rode in the 1935 Tour de France.
