= 1932 Giro di Lombardia =

Race details
- Dates: 23 October 1932
- Stages: 1
- Distance: 265 km (164.7 mi)
- Winning time: 8h 40' 01"

Results
	Winner	Antonio Negrini (ITA)
	Second	Domenico Piemontesi (ITA)
	Third	Remo Bertoni (ITA)

The 1932 Giro di Lombardia was the 28th edition of the Giro di Lombardia cycle race and was held on 23 October 1932. The race started and finished in Milan. The race was won by Antonio Negrini.

== General classification ==
Final general classification

Rank	Rider	Time
1	Antonio Negrini (ITA)	8h 40' 01"
2	Domenico Piemontesi (ITA)	+ 0"
3	Remo Bertoni (ITA)	+ 0"
4	Aldo Canazza (ITA)	+ 0"
5	Mario Cipriani (ITA)	+ 0"
6	Michele Mara (ITA)	+ 0"
7	Giovanni Firpo (ITA)	+ 0"
8	Pietro Rimoldi (ITA)	+ 0"
9	Antonio Fraccaroli (ITA)	+ 0"
10	Giovanni Vitali (ITA)	+ 0"
