= Jean Philip =

French cyclist

Personal information
- Born: 4 October 1912
- Died: 22 January 1983 (aged 70)

Cycling career
- Sport: Cycling
- Discipline: Road
- Role: Rider

Jean Philip (4 October 1912 – 22 January 1983) was a French racing cyclist. He rode in the 1935 Tour de France.
