= Paolo Mario Carlo Corallini =

French cyclist (1911–1992)

Personal information
- Born: 11 May 1911
- Died: 29 February 1992 (aged 80)

Cycling career
- Sport: Cycling
- Discipline: Road
- Role: Rider

Paolo Mario Carlo Corallini (11 May 1911 – 29 February 1992) was a French racing cyclist. He rode in the 1935 Tour de France.
