= Louis Halbourg =

French cyclist

Personal information
- Born: 10 May 1910
- Died: 5 March 1973 (aged 62)

Cycling career
- Sport: Cycling
- Discipline: Road
- Role: Rider

Louis Halbourg (10 May 1910 – 5 March 1973) was a French racing cyclist. He rode in the 1935 Tour de France.
