= 1933 UCI Road World Championships =

- Venue: Montlhéry, France
- Date: 14 August 1933
- Coordinates: 48°38′21″N 2°16′20″E
- Events: 2

The 1933 UCI Road World Championships was the thirteenth edition of the UCI Road World Championships, organized on Monday 14 August 1933.

The championship took place on a race circuit, the Autodrome de Linas-Montlhéry in Montlhéry, France. The amateurs rode their 125 km race in the morning, the professional riders (250 km) in the afternoon.

In the same period, the 1933 UCI Track Cycling World Championships was organized in the Parc des Princes in Paris.

== Events Summary ==
Event	Gold		Silver		Bronze	
Men's Events
Professional Road Race	Georges Speicher; France	7h 08' 58"; Media 34,967 km/h	Antonin Magne; France	+ 5' 03"	Marinus Valentijn; Netherlands	+ 5' 04"
Amateur Road Race	Paul Egli; Switzerland	-	Kurt Stettler; Switzerland	-	Joseph Lowagie; Belgium	-
