= Manuel Garcia (cyclist) =

French cyclist

Personal information
- Born: 10 June 1910
- Died: 25 June 1988 (aged 78)

Cycling career
- Sport: Cycling
- Discipline: Road
- Role: Rider

Manuel Garcia (10 June 1910 – 25 June 1988) was a French racing cyclist. He rode in the 1935 Tour de France.
