= 1932 UCI Road World Championships =

Cycling competition

- Venue: Rome, Italy
- Date: 31 August 1932
- Coordinates: 41°53′36″N 12°28′58″E
- Events: 2

The 1932 UCI Road World Championships was the twelfth edition of the UCI Road World Championships.

The championship took place on Wednesday 31 August 1932 in Rome, Italy.

21 professional cyclists, with a maximum of 3 for each country, started the race. On home soil, the Italian riders dominated the competition, with Alfredo Binda winning his third world championship.

In the same period, the 1932 UCI Track Cycling World Championships was organized in the Stadio Nazionale PNF in Rome.

== Events Summary ==
Event	Gold		Silver		Bronze	
Men's Events
Professional Road Race	Alfredo Binda; Italy	7h 01' 28"; Media 29,340 km/h	Remo Bertoni; Italy	+ 15"	Nicolas Frantz; Luxembourg	+ 4' 52"
Amateur Road Race	Giuseppe Martano; Italy	-	Paul Egli; Switzerland	-	Paul Chocque; France	-
