= Anton Hodey =

German cyclist

Personal information
- Born: 29 August 1908

Cycling career
- Sport: Cycling
- Discipline: Road
- Role: Rider

Anton Hodey (born 29 August 1908, date of death unknown) was a German racing cyclist. He rode in the 1935 Tour de France.
