= Georges Hubatz =

French cyclist

Personal information
- Born: 15 April 1912 Laon, France
- Died: 20 October 1993 (aged 81) Laon, France

Cycling career
- Sport: Cycling
- Discipline: Road
- Role: Rider

Georges Hubatz (15 April 1912 – 20 October 1993) was a French racing cyclist. He rode in the 1935 Tour de France.
