= Erich Händel =

German cyclist

Personal information
- Born: 24 March 1909 Eisenach, Germany
- Died: 10 September 1943 (aged 34) Sosnivka, Ukrainian SSR

Cycling career
- Sport: Cycling
- Discipline: Road
- Role: Rider

Erich Händel (24 March 1909 – 10 September 1943) was a German racing cyclist. He rode in the 1935 Tour de France.
