= Ferdinand Ickes =

German cyclist

Personal information
- Born: 12 July 1911

Cycling career
- Sport: Cycling
- Discipline: Road
- Role: Rider

Ferdinand Ickes (born 12 July 1911, date of death unknown) was a German racing cyclist. He rode in the 1935 Tour de France.
