= Bruno Roth =

German cyclist

Personal information
- Born: 23 April 1911 Frankfurt, Germany
- Died: 21 April 1998 (aged 86)

Cycling career
- Sport: Cycling
- Role: Rider

Bruno Roth (23 April 1911 – 21 April 1998) was a German racing cyclist. He won the German National Road Race in 1935. He also rode in the 1935 Tour de France.
