= Georges Lachat =

French cyclist

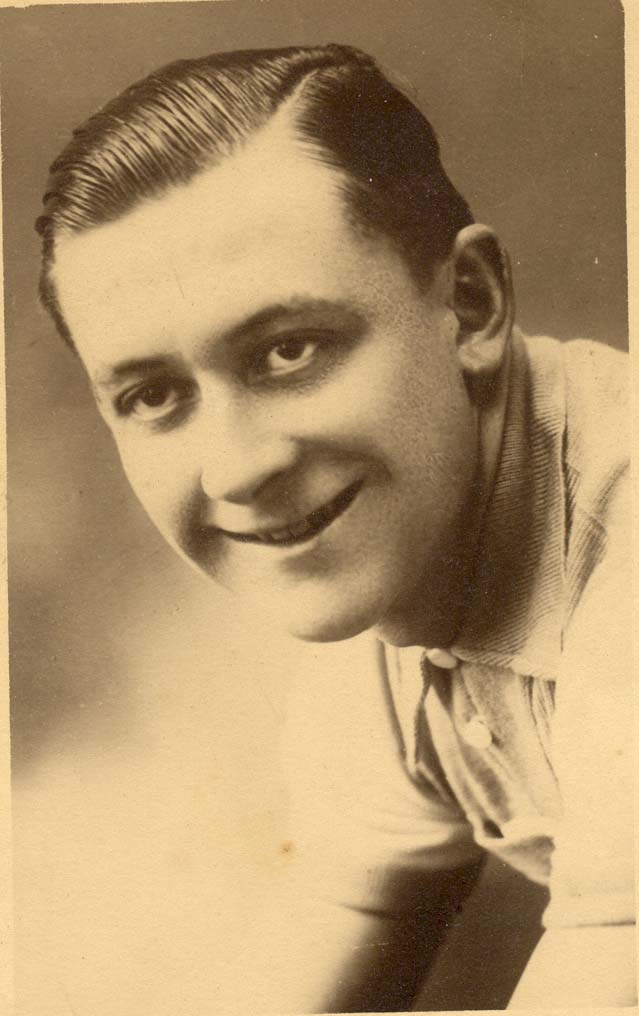

Personal information
- Born: 2 August 1910
- Died: 4 June 1992 (aged 81)

Cycling career
- Sport: Cycling
- Discipline: Road
- Role: Rider

Georges Lachat (2 August 1910 – 4 June 1992) was a French racing cyclist. He rode in the 1935 Tour de France.
