= Romain Maes =

Belgian cyclist

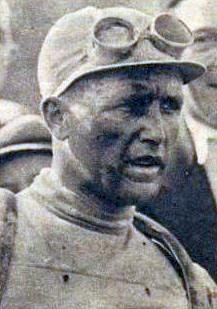
- Maes after winning a time trial in the 1939 Tour de France

Personal information
- Full name: Romain Maes
- Born: Romanus Maes; 10 August 1912 Zerkegem, Belgium
- Died: 22 February 1983 (aged 70) Groot-Bijgaarden, Belgium

Cycling career
- Sport: Cycling
- Discipline: Road
- Role: Rider

Major wins
- Grand Tours Tour de France General classification (1935) 4 individual stages (1935, 1939) Stage races Tour de l'Ouest (1933) One-day races and Classics Omloop der Vlaamse Gewesten (1939) Paris–Lille (1935)

Romanus Maes (pronounced [ʁɔ.mɛ̃ maːs]; 10 August 1912 – 22 February 1983) was a Belgian cyclist who won the 1935 Tour de France after wearing the yellow jersey of leadership from beginning to end. Maes was the 13th child in his family. He started racing when he was 17. He turned professional in 1933 and won the Tour de l'Ouest (Tour of the West). The following year he started the Tour de France and twice finished stages in second place. He then crashed on the day from Digne to Nice and left the race in an ambulance.

His Tour de France win in 1935 ended a six-year run by French riders. He became a hero in Belgium.

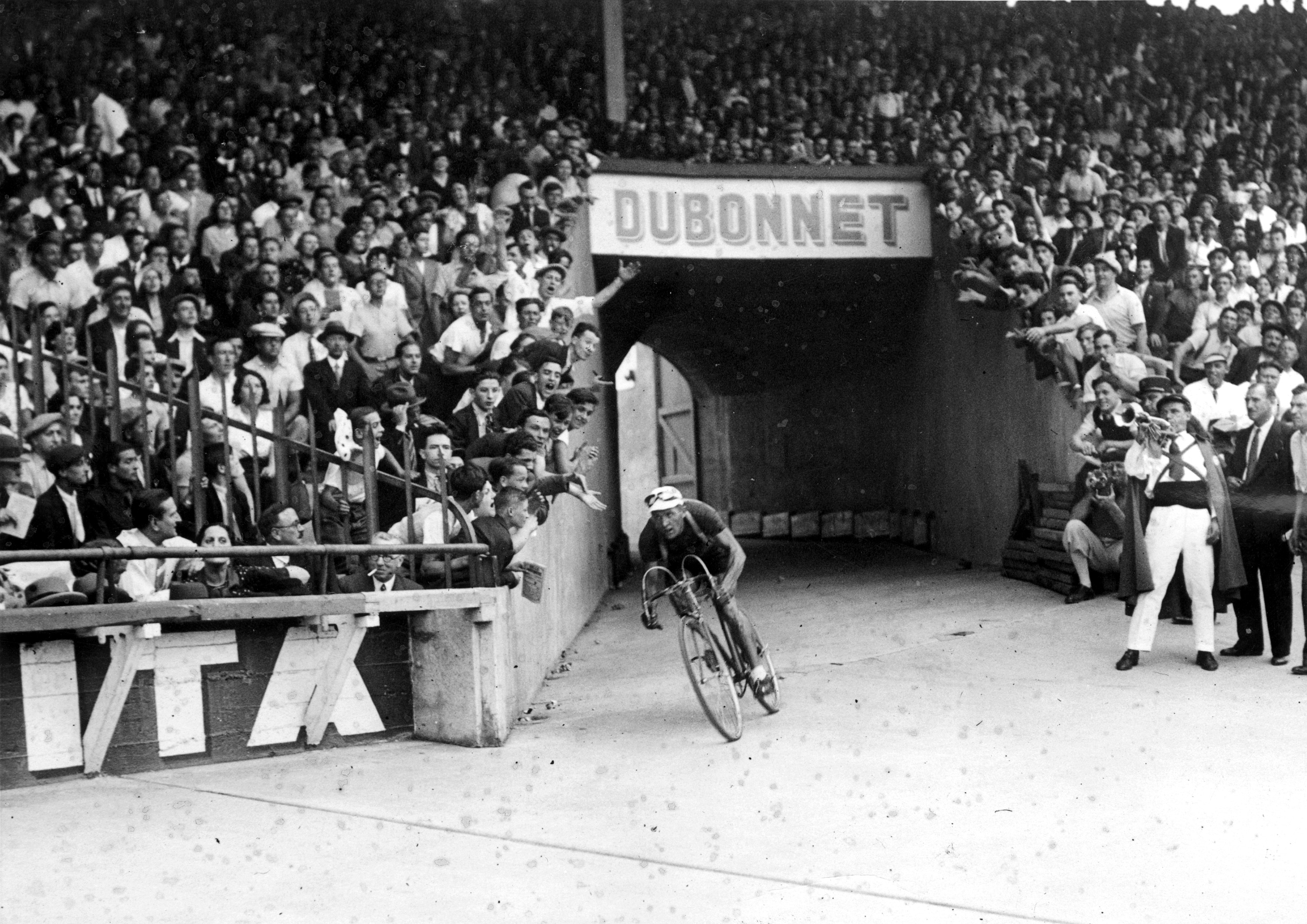
Maes enters a packed Parc des Princes stadium as final stage and overall winner in the 1935 Tour de France

He won the 1936 Paris–Roubaix but wasn't given the victory. The judge said he had seen the Frenchman, Georges Speicher, win.

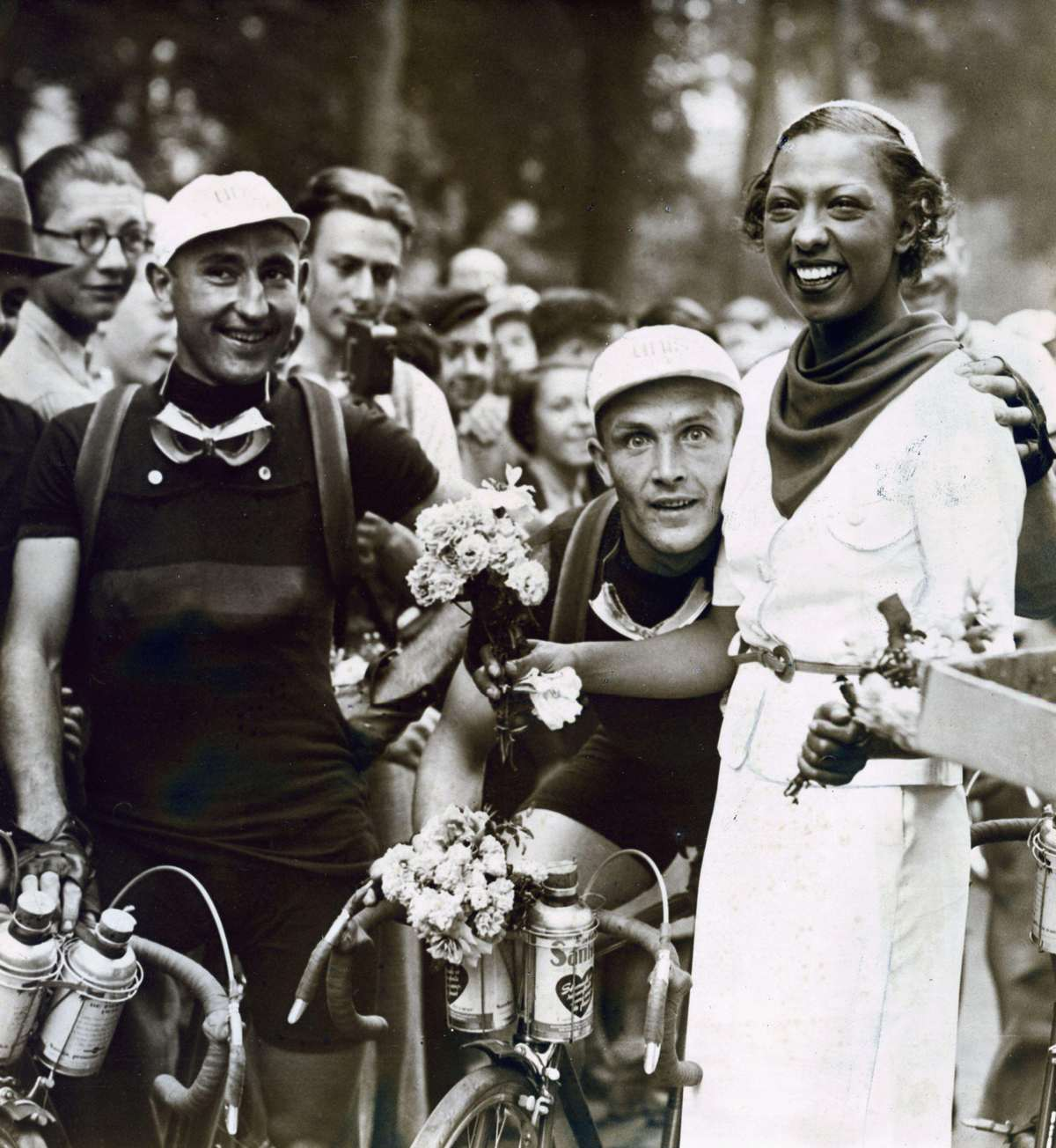
Sylvère Maes, Romain Maes and Josephine Baker at the start of the 1936 Tour de France

In 1938 he was well on the way to winning Paris-Brussels, leading the race by 100m with only 500m to go. He rode into the velodrome on which the race finished, crossed the line and stopped. The chasers, who had remembered that there was a further lap to ride, swept by him. Maes realised his mistake too late and Marcel Kint won.

Maes started the Tour de France in 1939 and won the stage from Caen to Vire, a time trial over 63 km. It gave him the lead. Then he crashed on the eighth stage and abandoned the race.

Maes rode on the track for several years with his namesake, Sylvère Maes, to whom he wasn't related.

Romain Maes stopped racing in 1944 and opened a bar, "In de Gele Trui" (In The Yellow Jersey), near the North station in Brussels.

== Career achievements ==
=== Major results ===
1933
1st Overall Tour de l'Ouest
1st GP Stekene (nl)
1934
1st Stage 1 Tour de l'Ouest
1st Stage 4 Paris–Nice
1st Wevelgem
3rd Paris–Brussels
7th Paris–Roubaix
1935
1st Overall Tour de France

1st Stages 1, 11 & 21

1st Paris–Lille (fr)
1st Critérium de Tournai
3rd Paris-Rennes (fr)
3rd Omloop der Vlaamse Gewesten
8th Giro della Provincia di Milano (it)
1936
1st Circuit de Paris (fr)
2nd Paris–Roubaix
1938
2nd Paris–Brussels
1939
1st Omloop der Vlaamse Gewesten
1st Stage 2a Tour de France
2nd Tour of Flanders
10th Paris–Tours
1942
1st Pâturages
1st Marcinelle

=== Grand Tour results timeline ===
	1934	1935	1936	1937	1938	1939
Giro d'Italia	DNE	DNE	DNE	DNE	DNE	DNE
Stages won	—	—	—	—	—	—
Mountains classification	—	—	—	—	—	—
Tour de France	DNF	1	DNF	DNE	DNE	DNF
Stages won	0	3	0	—	—	1
Mountains classification	NR	5	NR	—	—	NR
Vuelta a España	N/A	DNE	DNE	N/A	N/A	N/A
Stages won	N/A	—	—	N/A	N/A	N/A
Mountains classification	N/A	—	—	N/A	N/A	N/A

Legend
1	Winner
2–3	Top three-finish
4–10	Top ten-finish
11–	Other finish
DNE	Did not enter
DNF-x	Did not finish (retired on stage x)
DNS-x	Did not start (not started on stage x)
HD-x	Finished outside time limit (occurred on stage x)
DSQ	Disqualified
N/A	Race/classification not held
NR	Not ranked in this classification
