= Honoré Granier =

French cyclist

Personal information
- Born: 16 May 1911
- Died: 8 March 2001 (aged 89)

Cycling career
- Sport: Cycling
- Discipline: Road
- Role: Rider

Honoré Granier (16 May 1911 – 8 March 2001) was a French racing cyclist. He rode in the 1935 Tour de France.
