= Fritz Hartmann (cyclist) =

Swiss cyclist

Personal information
- Born: 24 February 1911
- Died: 11 November 1989 (aged 78)

Cycling career
- Sport: Cycling
- Discipline: Road
- Role: Rider

Fritz Hartmann (24 February 1911 – 11 November 1989) was a Swiss racing cyclist. He rode in the 1935 Tour de France.
