= Vicente Bachero =

Spanish cyclist (1905–1938)

Personal information
- Full name: Vicente Bachero Castells
- Born: 6 January 1905 Onda, Castellón, Spain
- Died: 1938 (aged 32–33)

Cycling career
- Sport: Cycling
- Discipline: Road
- Role: Rider

Vicente Bachero Castells (6 January 1905 – 1938) was a Spanish racing cyclist. He rode in the 1935 Tour de France. He was killed in the Battle of the Ebro in 1938.

== Major results ==
1932
4th Overall Vuelta a la Comunidad Valenciana
1933
8th Overall Volta a Catalunya
1934
2nd Overall Vuelta a Mallorca

1st Stage 1
