= René Debenne =

French cyclist

Personal information
- Born: 26 April 1914 Colombes, France
- Died: 16 February 2012 (aged 97)

Cycling career
- Sport: Cycling
- Role: Rider

René Debenne (26 April 1914 – 16 February 2012) was a French racing cyclist. He won stage 13a of the 1935 Giro d'Italia.
