= Remo Bertoni =

Italian cyclist

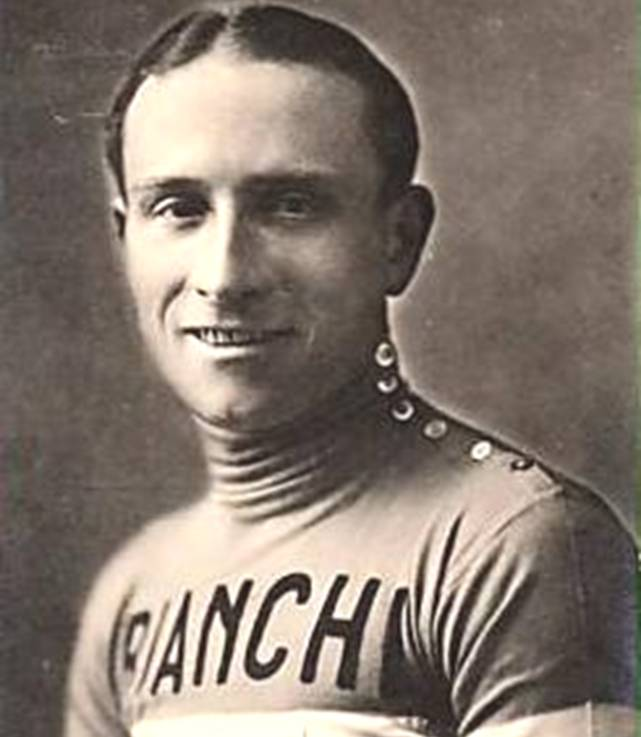

Personal information
- Born: 21 June 1909 Borgomanero, Italy
- Died: 18 September 1973 (aged 64) Borgomanero, Italy

Cycling career
- Sport: Cycling
- Discipline: Road
- Role: Rider

Professional teams
- 1929: Legnano–Torpedo
- 1930: Legnano–Pirelli
- 1931: Legnano–Hutchinson
- 1932: Gloria–Hutchinson
- 1933: Legnano–Hutchinson
- 1934: Bianchi
- 1935: Legnano
- 1936: Legnano–Wolsit
- 1937: Il Littorale
- 1938: Urago
Medal record
Representing Italy
Men's road bicycle racing
World Championships
Silver medal – second place	1929 Zürich	Amateur road race
Silver medal – second place	1932 Rome	Elite road race

Remo Bertoni (21 June 1909 – 18 September 1973) was an Italian professional road bicycle racer.

Bertoni was born in Borgomanero. He is best known for his silver medal in the elite race of the 1932 UCI Road World Championships. He died, aged 64, in Milan.

== Major results ==
1929
1st National Road Championships, Road Race (Independents)
2nd UCI Road World Championships, Road Race

1930
2nd Roma–Ascoli
2nd Giro dell'Umbria
5th Giro di Toscana

1931
1st GP Bendoni
1st GP Masnego
1st Stages 2 & 3, Giro di Campania
3rd Giro della Romagna

1932
1st Treviso–Monte Grappa
2nd UCI Road World Championships, Road Race
2nd National Road Championships, Road Race
3rd Overall Giro d'Italia

1st Stage 11

3rd Giro di Lombardia
4th Giro di Toscana

1933
1st Pistoia–Prunetta
2nd National Road Championships, Road Race
2nd Tre Valli Varesine
3rd Giro delle Due Province Messina

1934
1st Mountains Classification Giro d'Italia
1st Cittiglio–Leffe
1st Castellanza-Macugnaga
7th Giro di Toscana

1935
6th Overall Giro d'Italia

1939
3rd National Cyclo-cross Championships

=== Results timelines ===
Grand Tour	1929	1930	1931	1932	1933	1934	1935	1936	1937	1938
Giro d'Italia	—	—	—	3	19	6	6	DNF	—	—
Tour de France	—	—	—	—	—	—	DNF	—	—	—
Vuelta a España	—	—	—	—	—	—	—	—	—	—
Monument	1929	1930	1931	1932	1933	1934	1935	1936	1937	1938
Milan–San Remo	—	—	—	35	—	41	36	—	—	—
Tour of Flanders	—	—	—	—	—	—	—	—	—	—
Paris–Roubaix	—	—	—	—	—	—	—	—	—	—
Liège–Bastogne–Liège	—	—	—	—	—	—	—	—	—	—
Giro di Lombardia	—	—	—	3	—	—	—	—	—	—
