= Théodore Ladron =

French cyclist

Personal information
- Born: 9 November 1908

Cycling career
- Sport: Cycling
- Discipline: Road
- Role: Rider

Théodore Ladron (born 9 November 1908, date of death unknown) was a French racing cyclist. He rode in the 1935 Tour de France.
