= Charles Berty =

French cyclist (1911–1944)

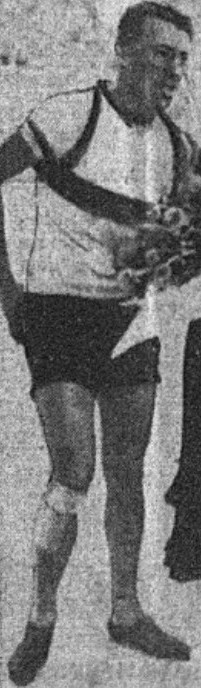
- Berty in 1936

Personal information
- Born: 8 September 1911 Saint-Laurent-du-Pont, France
- Died: 18 April 1944 (aged 32) Mauthausen concentration camp, Nazi Germany

Cycling career
- Sport: Cycling
- Discipline: Road
- Role: Rider

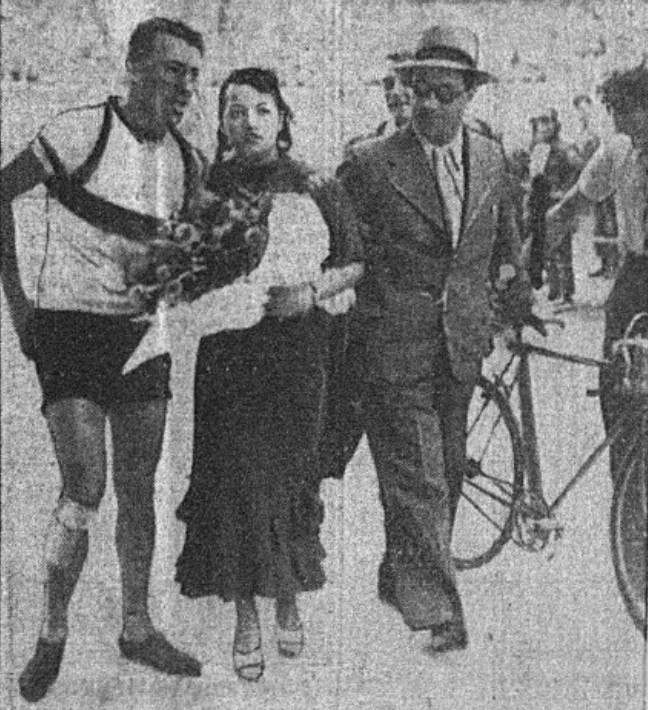
Charles Berty (left) with his fiancée (center) during the arrival in Grenoble of the 7th stage of the 1936 Tour de France, where he arrived in fourth position.

Charles Berty (8 September 1911 – 18 April 1944) was a French racing cyclist. He rode in the 1935 Tour de France. As a routier and regional of the "Sud-Est" team, he finished the Tour de France three times (1935/36/39), while achieving a few top ten placings in the stages.

During World War II Berty was active in the French Resistance. He was arrested and was sent to the Mauthausen concentration camp to do forced labor. Suffering from the camp conditions and physical abuse, he died in the camp on 18 April 1944.
