= Georg Stach =

German cyclist

Personal information
- Born: 15 July 1912 Berlin, Germany
- Died: 31 December 1943 (aged 31) Königs-Wusterhausen, Germany

Cycling career
- Sport: Cycling
- Role: Rider

Georg Stach (15 July 1912 – 31 December 1943) was a German racing cyclist. In 1940 he won the German National Road Race and the Großer Sachsenpreis at the Sachsenring in Chemnitz.
