= Georg Umbenhauer =

German cyclist (1912–1970)

Personal information
- Born: 20 September 1912 Nürnberg, Germany
- Died: 15 December 1970 (aged 58)

Cycling career
- Sport: Cycling
- Role: Rider

Georg Umbenhauer (20 September 1912 – 15 December 1970) was a German racing cyclist. He won the German National Road Race in 1936.
