= Gabriel Ruozzi =

French cyclist

Personal information
- Born: 27 March 1914
- Died: 14 September 1988 (aged 74)

Cycling career
- Sport: Cycling
- Discipline: Road
- Role: Rider

Gabriel Ruozzi (27 March 1914 – 14 September 1988) was a French racing cyclist. He rode in the 1935 Tour de France.
