= Vasco Bergamaschi =

Italian cyclist (1909–1979)

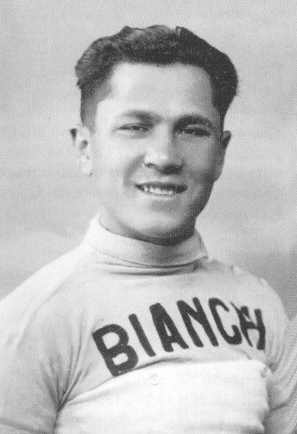

Personal information
- Full name: Vasco Bergamaschi
- Nickname: il fornaio volante
- Born: 29 September 1909 San Giacomo delle Segnate, Italy
- Died: 24 September 1979 (aged 69)

Cycling career
- Sport: Cycling
- Discipline: Road
- Role: Rider

Professional teams
- 1930: Individual
- 1932–1936: Maino
- 1937–1941: Bianchi
- 1942–1943: Milizia Contraerea Roma

Major wins
- Grand Tours Giro d'Italia General classification (1935)

Vasco Bergamaschi (29 September 1909 – 24 September 1979) was an Italian professional road racing cyclist.

== Career ==
Born in San Giacomo delle Segnate, Lombardy, Bergamaschi turned professional in 1930. The highlight of his career was his overall win in the 1935 Giro d'Italia, thanks to the collaboration of his teammate Learco Guerra. His other victories include a Giro del Veneto (1935), a Milano-Modena (1940), another stage in the 1939 Giro d'Italia, and a stage in the 1935 Tour de France.

He later worked as manager for the Torpado team.

== Career achievements ==
=== Major results ===
1930
Coppa del Re
Tour de Hongrie
1st Coppa Collecchio
1935
Giro del Veneto
Tour de France:

Winner stage 13A

Giro d'Italia:

Winner overall classification
Winner stages 1 and 11

1937
Bolzano
Coppa Buttafuocchi Revere
Novi Ligure
1939
Coppa Federale Pisa
Giro d'Italia:

Winner stage 1

1940
Milano – Modena

=== Grand Tour general classification results timeline ===
| Grand Tour | 1932 | 1933 | 1934 | 1935 | 1936 | 1937 | 1938 | 1939 | 1940 |
|---|---|---|---|---|---|---|---|---|---|
| Giro d'Italia | 36 | DNF | DNF | 1 | 8 | 18 | — | 23 | DNF |
| Tour de France | — | 39 | DNF | DNF | — | — | 33 | — | — |
| Vuelta a España | — | — | — | — | — | — | — | — | — |

Legend
| — | Did not compete |
| DNF | Did not finish |
