= Jules Lowie =

Belgian cyclist

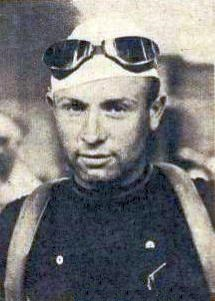
- Jules Lowie in 1939

Personal information
- Full name: Jules Lowie
- Born: 6 October 1913 Nokere, Belgium
- Died: 2 August 1960 (aged 46) Deinze, Belgium

Cycling career
- Sport: Cycling
- Discipline: Road
- Role: Rider

Professional teams
- 1935–1936: Génial Lucifer
- 1937–1940: Pélissier
- 1941–1947: Mercier

Major wins
- Paris–Nice (1938)

Jules Lowie (6 October 1913 – 2 August 1960) was a Belgian racing cyclist. His major win was Paris–Nice in 1938.

A native of the East Flanders town of Nokere, Jules Lowie died in Deinze two months short of his 47th birthday.

== Palmarès ==
- Gent–Wevelgem – 7th (1945)
- Flèche Wallonne
  - 4th (1944)
  - 8th (1943)
  - 10th (1945)
- Paris–Roubaix – 2nd (1943)
- Tour of Flanders
  - 5th (1942)
  - 7th (1935–1938–1941)
- Paris–Nice (1938)
  - 10th (1946)
- Paris-St. Etienne – 1 stage (1938)
- Tour de France – 5th
- Paris–Tours – 9th (1935)
