= Orlando Teani =

Italian cyclist

Personal information
- Born: 24 June 1910 Massa, Kingdom of Italy
- Died: 3 June 1972 (aged 61)

Cycling career
- Sport: Cycling
- Discipline: Road
- Role: Rider

Orlando Teani (24 June 1910 – 3 June 1972) was an Italian racing cyclist. He rode in the 1935 Tour de France.
