= Georges Speicher =

French cyclist

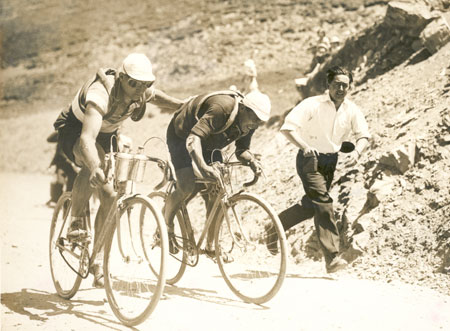

Personal information
- Full name: Georges Speicher
- Nickname: Le roi de Montlhéry (The King of Montlhéry)
- Born: 8 June 1907 Paris, France
- Died: 24 January 1978 (aged 70) Maisons-Laffitte, France

Cycling career
- Sport: Cycling
- Discipline: Road
- Role: Rider

Major wins
- Grand Tours Tour de France General classification (1933) 9 individual stages (1933-1935) One-day races and Classics Road Race World Championships (1933) National Road Race Championships (1935, 1937, 1939) Paris–Roubaix (1936) Paris–Arras (1931) Tour du Vaucluse (1933) Paris–Angers (1935) Paris–Rennes (1935) Challenge Sedis (1937)
Medal record
Men's road bicycle racing
Representing France
World Championships
Gold medal – first place	1933 Montlhéry	Elite Men's Road Race

Georges Speicher (pronounced [ʒɔʁʒ spɛ.ʃe]; 8 June 1907 – 24 January 1978) was a French cyclist who won the 1933 Tour de France along with three stage wins, and the 1933 World Cycling Championship.

After Speicher had won the 1933 Tour de France, he was initially not selected for the 1933 UCI Road World Championships. Only after a French cyclist that had been selected dropped out, Speicher was brought in as a replacement at the last notice, and won the race. Speicher was the first cyclist to win the Tour de France and the World Championship in the same year.

== Career achievements ==
=== Major results ===
1931
Paris-Arras
1932
10th Tour de France:
1933
World road race championship
Tour de France:

Winner overall classification
Winner stages 8, 9 and 12

1934
Tour de France:

Winner stages 1, 5, 6, 13 and 20

1935
France national road race championship
Paris-Rennes
Paris-Angers
Tour de France:

6th place overall classification
Winner stage 13B

1936
Alger
Paris–Roubaix (victory contested by Romain Maes)
1937
France national road race championship
1939
France national road race championship

=== Grand Tour results timeline ===
	1932	1933	1934	1935	1936	1937	1938
Giro d'Italia	DNE	DNE	DNE	DNE	DNE	DNE	DNE
Stages won	—	—	—	—	—	—	—
Mountains classification	N/A	—	—	—	—	—	—
Tour de France	10	1	11	6	DNF-7	DNF-7	DSQ
Stages won	0	3	5	1	0	0	0
Mountains classification	N/A	11	NR	24	NR	NR	NR
Vuelta a España	N/A	N/A	N/A	DNE	DNE	N/A	N/A
Stages won	N/A	N/A	N/A	—	—	N/A	N/A
Mountains classification	N/A	N/A	N/A	—	—	N/A	N/A

Legend
1	Winner
2–3	Top three-finish
4–10	Top ten-finish
11–	Other finish
DNE	Did not enter
DNF-x	Did not finish (retired on stage x)
DNS-x	Did not start (not started on stage x)
HD-x	Finished outside time limit (occurred on stage x)
DSQ	Disqualified
N/A	Race/classification not held
NR	Not ranked in this classification
