= Ambrogio Morelli =

Italian cyclist

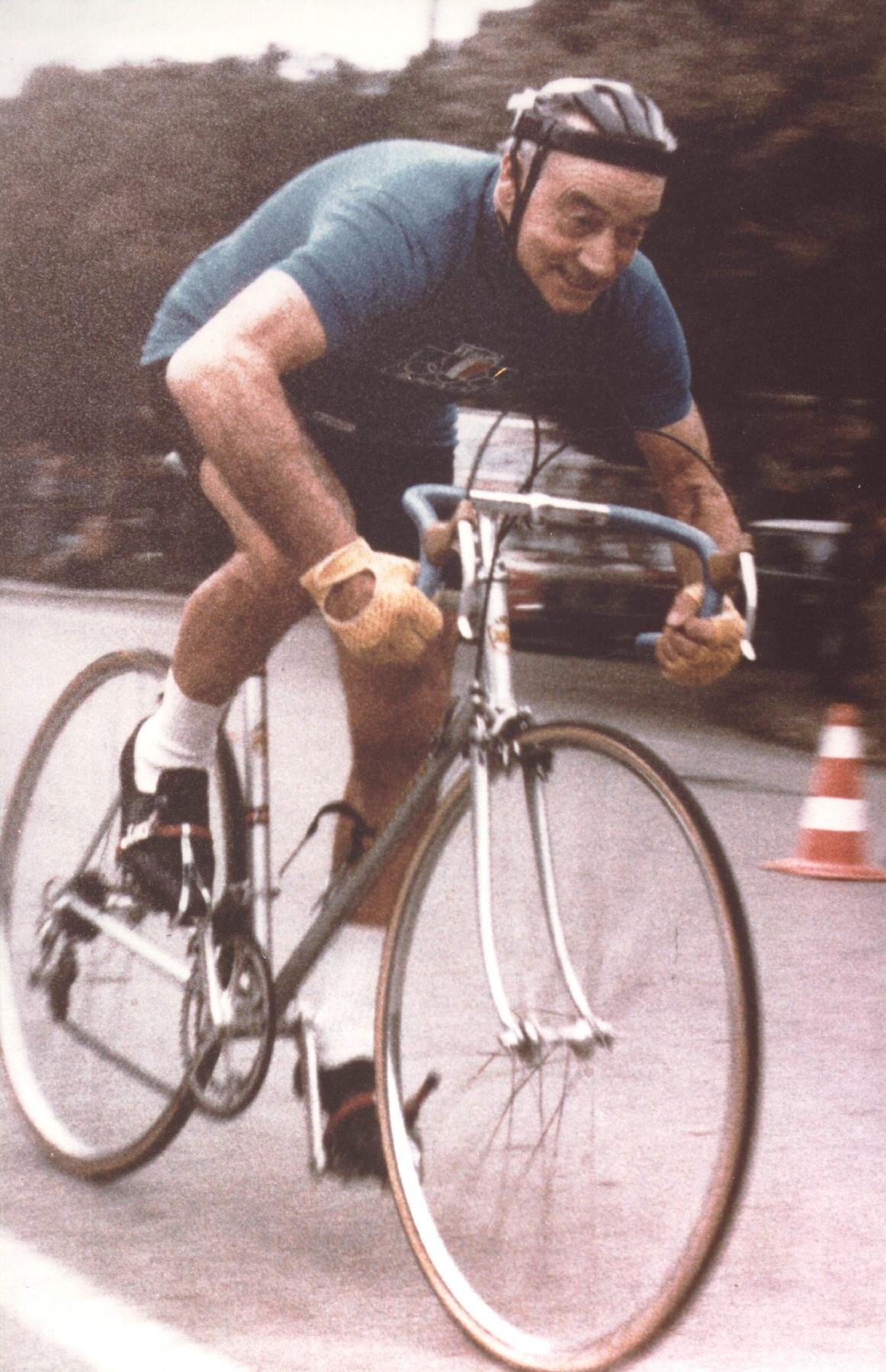
- Ambrogio Morelli in 1985

Personal information
- Full name: Ambrogio Enrico Morelli
- Born: 4 September 1905 Nerviano, Italy
- Died: 10 October 2000 (aged 95) Nerviano, Italy

Cycling career
- Sport: Cycling
- Discipline: Road
- Role: Rider

Major wins
- 2nd place 1935 Tour de France

Ambrogio Morelli (4 September 1905, in Nerviano – 10 October 2000, in Nerviano) was an Italian professional road bicycle racer.

== Major results ==
1929
Tre Valli Varesine
Giro d'Italia:

10th place overall classification

1930
Giro del Piemonte
Giro dell'Umbria
Giro d'Italia:

4th place overall classification

1931
Giro d'Italia:

8th place overall classification
Winner stage 12

1934
Tour de France:

6th place overall classification

1935
Tour de France:

2nd place overall classification
Winner stages 16 and 20B

Giro d'Italia:

10th place overall classification

1936
Giro d'Italia:

7th place overall classification

1937
Giro d'Italia:

9th place overall classification
