= Maurice Archambaud =

French cyclist (1908–1955)

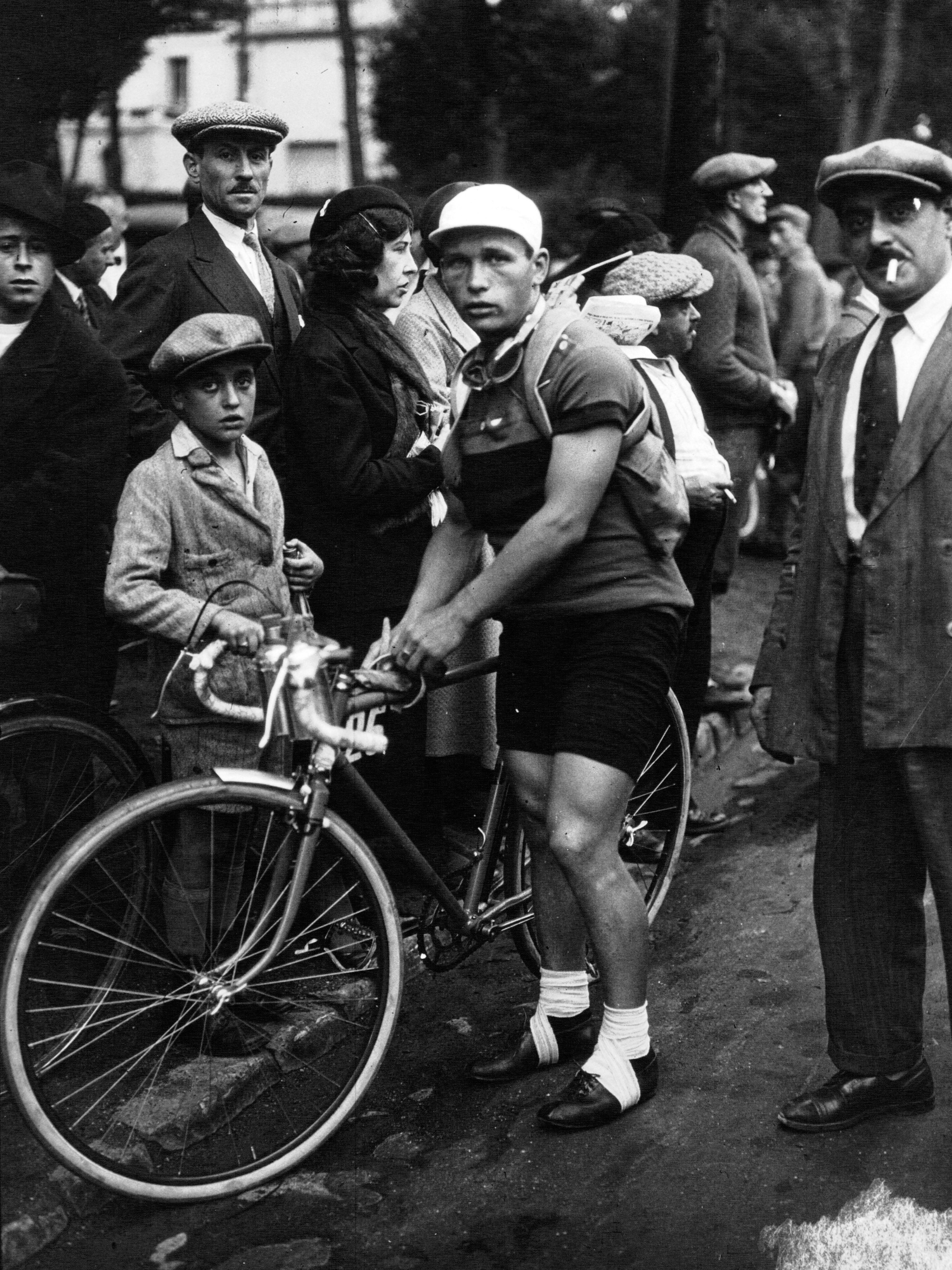
- Maurice Archambaud during the Tour de France 1932

Personal information
- Full name: Maurice Archambaud
- Nickname: Le Nabot
- Born: 30 August 1908 Paris, France
- Died: 3 December 1955 (aged 47) Le Raincy, France

Cycling career
- Sport: Cycling
- Discipline: Road
- Role: Rider

Major wins
- 10 stages Tour de France; Paris–Nice (1936 and 1939)

Maurice Archambaud (30 August 1908 in Paris – 3 December 1955 in Le Raincy) was a French professional cyclist from 1932 to 1944. His short stature earned him the nickname of le nabot, or "the dwarf", but his colossal thighs made him an exceptional rider.

As an amateur, he won the Paris-Soissons and the Paris-Verneuil in 1931 and turned professional the following year for Alcyon, one of the top teams in France. He won the inaugural Grand Prix des Nations in his first season.

He set the world hour record at 45.767 km at the Vigorelli velodrome in Milan on 3 November 1937. He beat the Dutchman, Frans Slaats' record of 45.485 km, set on 29 September 1937. The record stood for five years before being beaten by Fausto Coppi.

Archambaud rode for France in the Tour de France between the wars. His sudden changes of form and frequent falls meant that he never won the race, but he did win ten stages and wear the yellow jersey.

He won a shorter stage race, Paris–Nice, in 1936 and 1939.

== Major results ==
1932
Grand Prix des Nations: winner
1933
Tour de France:

Winner stages 1 and 11
5th overall
9 days in the yellow jersey

1935
Tour de France:

Winner stages 5A and 14B
7th overall

Giro d'Italia:

Winner stage 14B

Paris-Caen
Six days of Paris
GP de l'Echo d'Alger
1936
Tour de France:

Winner stage 4
5 days in the yellow jersey.

Paris–Nice
1937
Tour de France:

Winner stage 2

Hour record
Giro della provincia Milano (with Aldo Bini)
1939
Tour de France:

Winner stages 10B, 10C, 12B and 17B

Paris–Nice

Records
Preceded by Frans Slaats	UCI hour record (45.767 km); 3 November 1937-7 November 1942	Succeeded by Fausto Coppi
