= René Bernard =

French cyclist

René Bernard (18 September 1904 – 21 February 1969) was a French professional cyclist. He came 10th in the 1933 Paris–Roubaix, 4 minutes and 16 seconds behind the winner.
