= 1935 Tour de France =

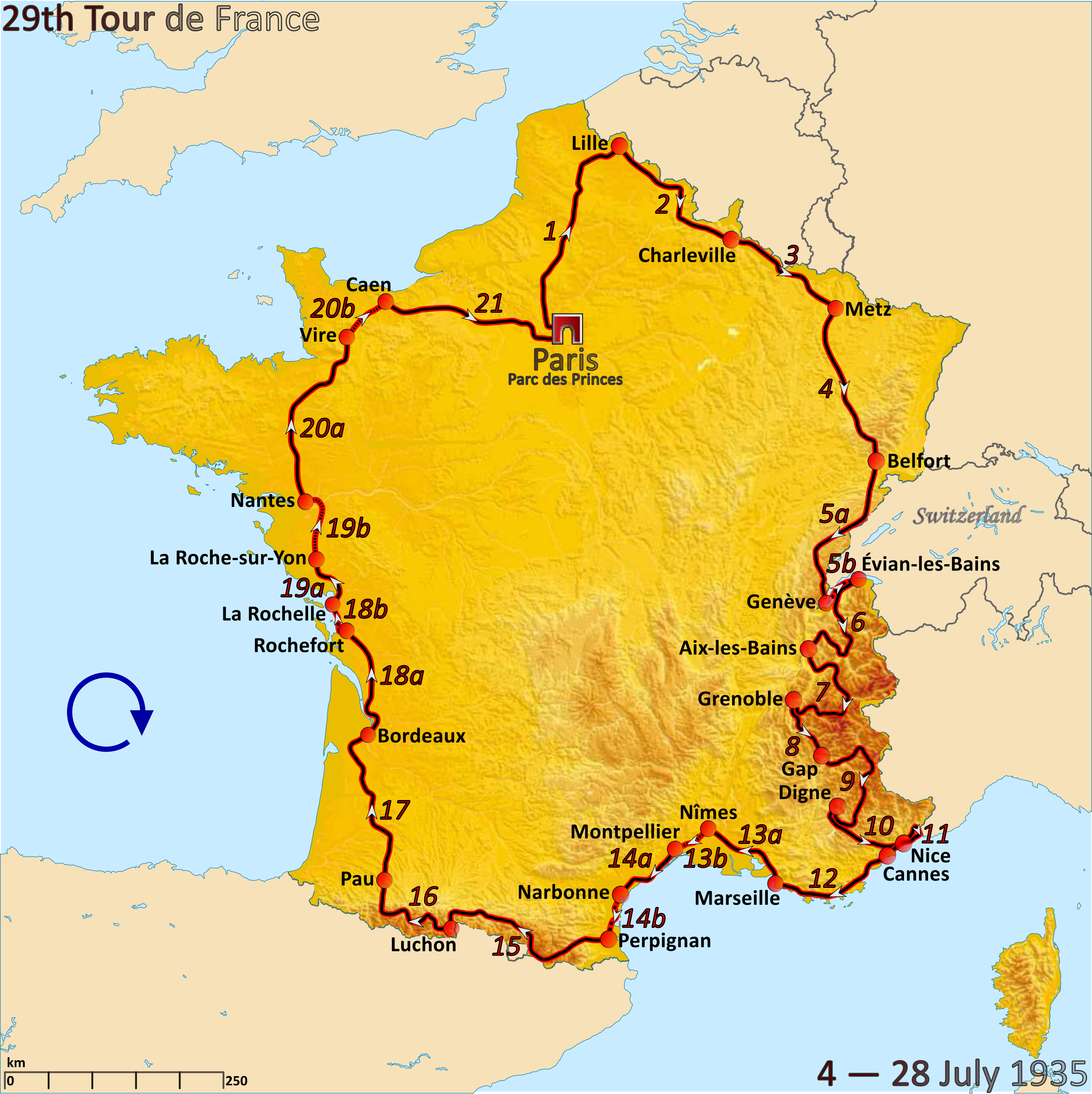
- Route of the 1935 Tour de France followed clockwise, starting in Paris

Race details
- Dates: 4–28 July 1935
- Stages: 21, including six split stages
- Distance: 4,338 km (2,696 mi)
- Winning time: 141h 32' 00"

Results
Jersey awarded to the overall winner	Winner	Romain Maes (BEL)	(Belgium)
	Second	Ambrogio Morelli (ITA)	(Italian individuals)
	Third	Félicien Vervaecke (BEL)	(Belgium)
	Mountains	Félicien Vervaecke (BEL)	(Belgium)
	Team	Belgium	

The 1935 Tour de France was the 29th edition of the Tour de France, taking place from 4 to 28 July. It consisted of 21 stages over 4,338 km (2,696 mi). Although the French team was favourite, Belgian Romain Maes took the lead in the first stage, and never gave it away. Halfway the race, Romain Maes' biggest threat, Antonin Magne, had to abandon after he was hit by a motorist.

In the eighth stage, Spanish cyclist Francisco Cepeda fell while he was descending at high speed, and died while he was being transported to the hospital.

== Innovations and changes ==
This was the first Tour that had a stage finish and start in a city in Switzerland, when Geneva was visited in the fifth stage.

The prize money increased in 1935, and for the first time it was more than one million Francs.

== Teams ==
As was the custom since the 1930 Tour de France, the 1935 Tour de France was contested by national teams. Belgium, Italy, Spain, Germany and France each sent teams of 8 cyclists. Each country also sent four cyclists who rode as individuals, but could take over the place of another cyclist if they dropped out. Spain only sent three cyclists, and Switzerland sent four individual cyclists even though they did not have a national team, so 23 individual cyclists were racing. Finally, there was the touriste-routiers category, in which 30 cyclists participated. In total this made 93 cyclists. Split up in nationalities, there were 41 French, 13 Italian, 12 Belgian, 12 German, 11 Spanish and 4 Swiss cyclists.

The French team looked very strong, as it contained the three winners of the last five Tours, Antonin Magne, Georges Speicher and André Leducq, in addition to climber René Vietto and Maurice Archambaud, who had led the general classification for a long time in 1933. In addition, they had Roger Lapébie and Charles Pélissier riding as individuals, which meant that they could take the place of a French team member dropping out.

Of the other teams, the Belgian and Italian teams seemed most likely to challenge the French.

The teams entering the race were:

- Belgium
- Italy
- Spain
- Germany
- France
- Belgium Individuals
- Italy Individuals
- Spain Individuals
- Germany Individuals
- France Individuals
- Switzerland Individuals

== Route and stages ==
Stages 5, 13, 14, 18, 19 and 20 are retroactively seen as split stages, always between a standard mass-start stage and a time trial stage. In 1935, the mass-start stages were seen as a normal stage, and the time trial stages were not numbered.

Stages 5b, 14b and 18b were individual time trials, while stages 13b, 19b and 20b where team time trials. In the team time trials in 1935, cyclists started together in teams, but unlike current team time trials it was the individual time that counted; the team time trial was not won by a team but by a cyclist.

The highest point of elevation in the race was 2,556 m (8,386 ft) at the summit tunnel of the Col du Galibier mountain pass on stage 7.

Stage characteristics and winners
Stage	Date	Course	Distance	Type (Note: In 1935, there was no distinction in the rules between plain stages and mountain stages; the icons shown here indicate whether the stage was run as a time trial, the stage was flat or the stage included mountains that counted towards the mountains classification.)	Winner
1	4 July	Paris to Lille	262 km (163 mi)	Plain stage	Romain Maes (BEL)
2	5 July	Lille to Charleville	192 km (119 mi)	Plain stage	Charles Pélissier (FRA)
3	6 July	Charleville to Metz	161 km (100 mi)	Plain stage	Rafaele di Paco (ITA)
4	7 July	Metz to Belfort	220 km (140 mi)	Stage with mountain(s)	Jean Aerts (BEL)
5a	8 July	Belfort to Geneva, Switzerland	262 km (163 mi)	Plain stage	Maurice Archambaud (FRA)
5b	8 July	Geneva to Evian	58 km (36 mi)	Individual time trial	Rafaele di Paco (ITA)
	9 July	Evian		Rest day	
6	10 July	Evian to Aix-les-Bains	207 km (129 mi)	Stage with mountain(s)	René Vietto (FRA)
7	11 July	Aix-les-Bains to Grenoble	229 km (142 mi)	Stage with mountain(s)	Francesco Camusso (ITA)
8	12 July	Grenoble to Gap	102 km (63 mi)	Stage with mountain(s)	Jean Aerts (BEL)
9	13 July	Gap to Digne	227 km (141 mi)	Stage with mountain(s)	René Vietto (FRA)
10	14 July	Digne to Nice	156 km (97 mi)	Plain stage	Jean Aerts (BEL)
	15 July	Nice		Rest day	
11	16 July	Nice to Cannes	126 km (78 mi)	Stage with mountain(s)	Romain Maes (BEL)
12	17 July	Cannes to Marseille	195 km (121 mi)	Plain stage	Charles Pélissier (FRA)
13a	18 July	Marseille to Nîmes	112 km (70 mi)	Plain stage	Vasco Bergamaschi (ITA)
13b	18 July	Nîmes to Montpellier	56 km (35 mi)	Individual time trial	Georges Speicher (FRA)
14a	19 July	Montpellier to Narbonne	103 km (64 mi)	Plain stage	René Le Grevès (FRA)
14b	19 July	Narbonne to Perpignan	63 km (39 mi)	Individual time trial	Maurice Archambaud (FRA)
15	20 July	Perpignan to Luchon	325 km (202 mi)	Stage with mountain(s)	Sylvère Maes (BEL)
	21 July	Luchon		Rest day	
16	22 July	Luchon to Pau	194 km (121 mi)	Stage with mountain(s)	Ambrogio Morelli (ITA)
	23 July	Pau		Rest day	
17	24 July	Pau to Bordeaux	224 km (139 mi)	Plain stage	Julien Moineau (FRA)
18a	25 July	Bordeaux to Rochefort	158 km (98 mi)	Plain stage	René Le Grevès (FRA)
18b	25 July	Rochefort to La Rochelle	33 km (21 mi)	Individual time trial	André Leducq (FRA)
19a	26 July	La Rochelle to La Roche sur Yon	81 km (50 mi)	Plain stage	René Le Grevès (FRA)
19b	26 July	La Roche sur Yon to Nantes	95 km (59 mi)	Individual time trial	Jean Aerts (BEL)
20a	27 July	Nantes to Vire	220 km (140 mi)	Plain stage	René Le Grevès (FRA)
20b	27 July	Vire to Caen	55 km (34 mi)	Individual time trial	Ambrogio Morelli (ITA)
21	28 July	Caen to Paris	221 km (137 mi)	Plain stage	Romain Maes (BEL)
	Total		4,338 km (2,696 mi)		

== Race overview ==
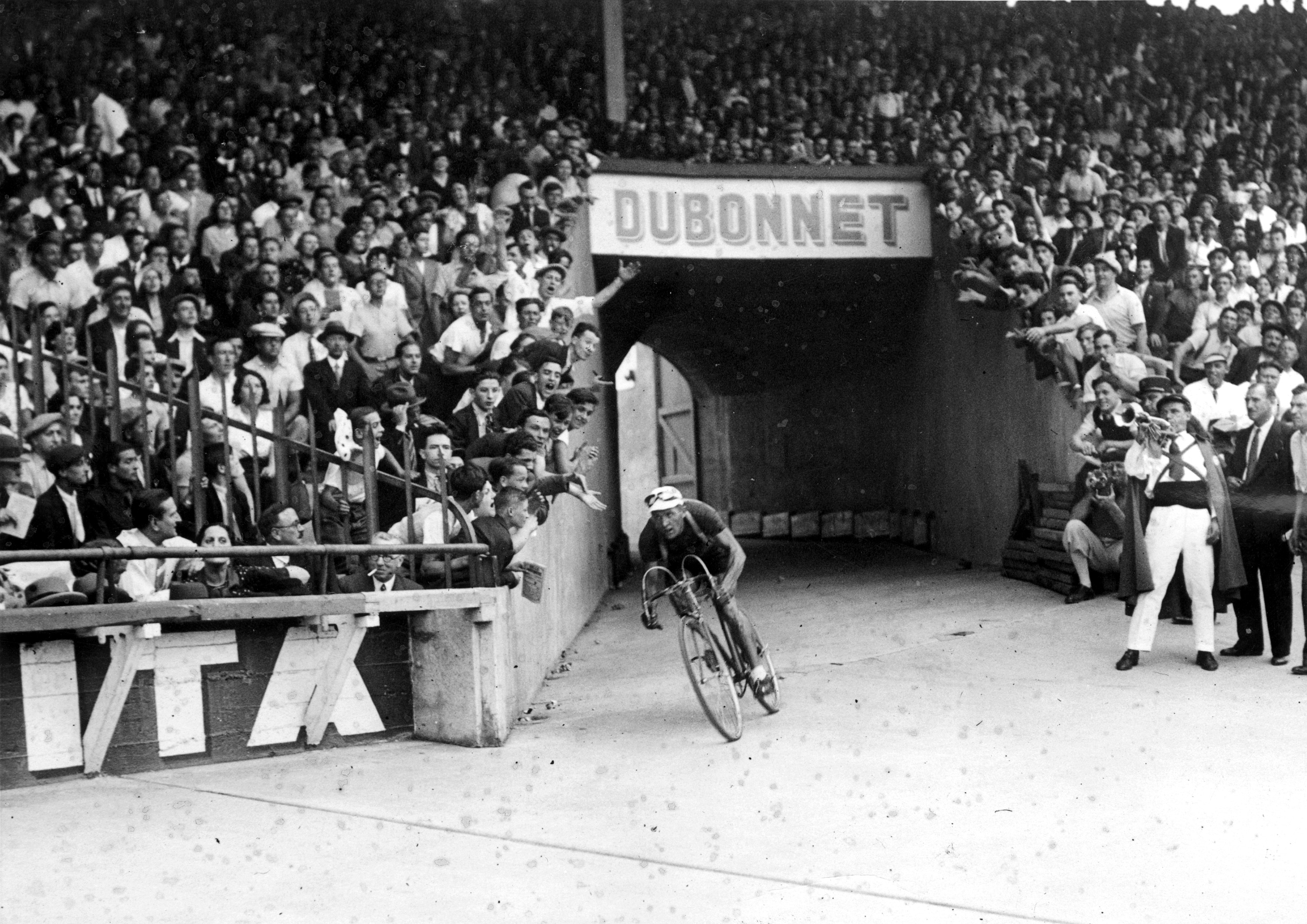
Belgian Romain Maes entering the Parc des Princes on the final stage, winning it and the general classification

In the first stage, Belgian Romain Maes was lucky as he passed a train crossing just before it closed, while the rest had to wait. Romain Maes was one minute ahead, and although he was chased, the others could not capture him. In the second stage, Romain Maes was less lucky, as several flat tires put him nine minutes behind the peloton. The Belgian team chased for 70 km to get him back with the rest. The stage was won by French sprinter Charles Pélissier. Romain Maes and Charles Pélissier were now ranked first and second, but nobody expected them to remain on top of the general classification.

On the fourth stage, the French team performed poorly; the first French cyclist came in tenth place, and Romain Maes increased his leading margin to over five minutes. In the second part of the fifth stage, Romain Maes performed unexpectedly well, as he lost only 38 seconds to Magne, a time trial specialist. Magne was in second place in the general classification, about four minutes behind Romain Maes.

The sixth stage, the first in the Alps, was perfect for a climber like Vietto, and he indeed took the victory solo. Magne was still about four minutes behind Romain Maes. In the seventh stage, Magne was hit by a motorist, and had to abandon the race. Later in that stage, Spanish cyclist Francisco Cepeda died after he fell going down the Galibier. One of his tires peeled off his rim, causing him to crash at a high speed. Because Magne was out of the race, Vasco Bergamaschi became the new number two of the general classification, more than twelve minutes behind Romain Maes. In the ninth stage, Bergamaschi lost half an hour, and was out of contention for the victory. René Vietto won the stage, with Francesco Camusso a few seconds behind him. Romain Maes lost almost ten minutes, and Camusso jumped to second place in the general classification, three and a half minutes behind Romain Maes.

In the tenth, eleventh and twelfth stage, Romain Maes won some time on Camusso. The second part of the thirteenth stage was a team time trial, in which the French team beat the Belgian team by 27 seconds, and put Speicher within 9 minutes of Maes in the general classification. In the second part of the fourteenth stage, however, Romain Maes finished in second place, thereby increasing his lead in the general classification to more than ten minutes on Speicher, who had jumped to second place.

The fifteenth stage was fought on the Pyrenees. Belgian cyclists Felicien Vervaecke and Sylvère Maes led and beat the others by minutes. The first three places in the general classification were now all occupied by Belgian cyclists; Romain Maes, Vervaecke and Sylvère Maes.

In the sixteenth stage Romain Maes ran into trouble for the first time in 1935. The Belgian team controlled the race over the first three mountains, but on the fourth, the Aubisque, Italians Ambrogio Morelli and Orlando Teani escaped. Morelli won the stage and took the time bonus, and Romain Maes needed his teammates to keep his losses small. Vervaecke and Jules Lowie helped him to keep it to only six minutes, and Romain Maes was still ahead in the general classification, although only two and a half minute ahead of Morelli.

In the first half of the eighteenth stage, Morelli lost ten minutes. Jean Aerts crossed the finish line first in that stage, but he was set to second place by the jury because he had sprinted irregularly. Maes finished second in the second part of that stage, and increased his lead even more. Initially Jean Fontenay was declared winner of that stage, but he got a penalty of five minutes after the jury found out he had been helped by a car. Romain Maes finished the Tour by escaping in the last stage, and finishing alone in Paris.

== Classification leadership and minor prizes ==
The time that each cyclist required to finish each stage was recorded, and these times were added together for the general classification. If a cyclist had received a time bonus, it was subtracted from this total; all time penalties were added to this total. The cyclist with the least accumulated time was the race leader, identified by the yellow jersey.

For the mountains classification, 15 mountains were selected by the Tour organisation. On the top of these mountains, ten points were given for the first cyclist to pass, nine points to the second cyclist, and so on, until the tenth cyclist who got one point.

The team classification was calculated in 1935 by adding up the times of the best three cyclists of a team; the team with the least time was the winner. Individuals that ranked higher than team members could be put in the team. This happened with the Belgian team: individual Sylvère Maes ranked higher than the third Belgian team member Jean Aerts, so his time was used for the calculation. If this rule would have not been in place, the French team would have won the team classification. It also happened with the Spanish team, which had only two cyclists left at the end of the race; Spanish individual Vicente Bachero was added to the team. The Italian team had no cyclists left at the end of the race. There were two Italians in the individual category that were then added for the team calculation, but they still lacked a third team member. For that case there was a rule that said that an imaginary cyclist would be added to the team, that had the time of the final cyclist plus one hour penalty time.

Second-placed Morelli was the best cyclist who had started in the "individuals" category, while ninth-placed Ruozzi became the winner of the "touriste-routiers" category. However, in 1935 Morelli was considered to have been included in the Italian team, while Sylvère Maes and Jules Lowie are considered to have been included in the Belgian team, which made Charles Pélissier the best placed individual cyclist.

Classification leadership by stage
Stage	Winner	General classification	Mountains classification (Note: No jersey was awarded to the leader of the mountains classification until a white jersey with red polka dots was introduced in 1975.)	Team classification	Classification for individuals	Classification for touriste-routiers
1	Romain Maes	Romain Maes	no award	France	Charles Pélissier	René Bernard
2	Charles Pélissier	Romain Maes	no award	France	Charles Pélissier	René Bernard
3	Rafaele di Paco	Romain Maes	no award	France	Charles Pélissier	René Bernard
4	Jean Aerts	Romain Maes	Félicien Vervaecke	France	Eugenio Gestri	René Bernard
5a	Maurice Archambaud	Romain Maes	Félicien Vervaecke	France	Eugenio Gestri	René Bernard
5b	Rafaele di Paco	Romain Maes	Félicien Vervaecke	France	Jules Lowie	René Bernard
6	René Vietto	Romain Maes	Félicien Vervaecke	France	Jules Lowie	René Bernard
7	Francesco Camusso	Romain Maes	Félicien Vervaecke	France	Jules Lowie	René Bernard
8	Jean Aerts	Romain Maes	Félicien Vervaecke	France	François Neuville	René Bernard
9	René Vietto	Romain Maes	Félicien Vervaecke	France	Bruno Roth	Gabriel Ruozzi
10	Jean Aerts	Romain Maes	Félicien Vervaecke	France	Charles Pélissier	Gabriel Ruozzi
11	Romain Maes	Romain Maes	Félicien Vervaecke	France	Charles Pélissier	Gabriel Ruozzi
12	Charles Pélissier	Romain Maes	Félicien Vervaecke	France	Charles Pélissier	Gabriel Ruozzi
13a	Vasco Bergamaschi	Romain Maes	Félicien Vervaecke	France	Charles Pélissier	Gabriel Ruozzi
13b	Georges Speicher	Romain Maes	Félicien Vervaecke	France	Charles Pélissier	Gabriel Ruozzi
14a	René Le Grevès	Romain Maes	Félicien Vervaecke	France	Charles Pélissier	Gabriel Ruozzi
14b	Maurice Archambaud	Romain Maes	Félicien Vervaecke	France	Charles Pélissier	Gabriel Ruozzi
15	Sylvère Maes	Romain Maes	Félicien Vervaecke	France	Charles Pélissier	Gabriel Ruozzi
16	Ambrogio Morelli	Romain Maes	Félicien Vervaecke	France	Charles Pélissier	Gabriel Ruozzi
17	Julien Moineau	Romain Maes	Félicien Vervaecke	France	Charles Pélissier	Gabriel Ruozzi
18a	René Le Grevès	Romain Maes	Félicien Vervaecke	France	Charles Pélissier	Gabriel Ruozzi
18b	André Leducq	Romain Maes	Félicien Vervaecke	France	Charles Pélissier	Gabriel Ruozzi
19a	René Le Grevès	Romain Maes	Félicien Vervaecke	France	Charles Pélissier	Gabriel Ruozzi
19b	Jean Aerts	Romain Maes	Félicien Vervaecke	France	Charles Pélissier	Gabriel Ruozzi
20a	René Le Grevès	Romain Maes	Félicien Vervaecke	France	Charles Pélissier	Gabriel Ruozzi
20b	Ambrogio Morelli	Romain Maes	Félicien Vervaecke	France	Charles Pélissier	Gabriel Ruozzi
21	Romain Maes	Romain Maes	Félicien Vervaecke	France	Charles Pélissier	Gabriel Ruozzi
Final		Romain Maes	Felicien Vervaecke	France	Charles Pélissier	Gabriel Ruozzi

== Final standings ==
=== General classification ===
Final general classification (1–10)
Rank	Rider	Team	Time
1	Romain Maes (BEL)	Belgium	141h 32' 00"
2	Ambrogio Morelli (ITA)	Italian individuals	+ 17' 52"
3	Félicien Vervaecke (BEL)	Belgium	+ 24' 06"
4	Sylvère Maes (BEL)	Belgian individuals	+ 35' 24"
5	Jules Lowie (BEL)	Belgian individuals	+ 51' 26"
6	Georges Speicher (FRA)	France	+ 54' 29"
7	Maurice Archambaud (FRA)	France	+ 1h 09' 28"
8	René Vietto (FRA)	France	+ 1h 21' 03"
9	Gabriel Ruozzi (FRA)	Touriste-routier	+ 1h 34' 02"
10	Oskar Thierbach (GER)	Germany	+ 2h 00' 04"

Final general classification (11–46)
Rank	Rider	Team	Time
11	Pierre Cogan (FRA)	Touriste-routier	+ 2h 11' 56"
12	Benoît Faure (FRA)	Touriste-routier	+ 2h 21' 01"
13	Charles Pélissier (FRA)	French individual	+ 2h 29' 21"
14	René Bernard (FRA)	Touriste-routier	+ 2h 30' 47"
15	René Le Grevès (FRA)	France	+ 2h 40' 05"
16	Fernand Fayolle (FRA)	Touriste-routier	+ 2h 48' 07"
17	André Leducq (FRA)	France	+ 2h 56' 14"
18	Pierre Cloarec (FRA)	Touriste-routier	+ 3h 19' 55"
19	Joseph Mauclair (FRA)	Touriste-routier	+ 3h 20' 36"
20	Antoon Dignef (BEL)	Belgian individual	+ 3h 24' 52"
21	Dante Gianello (FRA)	Touriste-routier	+ 3h 28' 30"
22	Salvador Cardona (ESP)	Spain	+ 3h 50' 59"
23	Bruno Roth (GER)	German individual	+ 3h 51' 06"
24	Leo Amberg (SUI)	Swiss individual	+ 3h 56' 25"
25	Jean Fontenay (FRA)	French individual	+ 4h 09' 56"
26	Fritz Hartmann (SUI)	Swiss individual	+ 4h 14' 37"
27	Orlando Teani (ITA)	Italian individual	+ 4h 17' 32"
28	Honoré Granier (FRA)	Touriste-routier	+ 4h 24' 36"
29	Jean Aerts (BEL)	Belgium	+ 4h 28' 05"
30	Julien Moineau (FRA)	French individual	+ 4h 33' 46"
31	Paul Chocque (FRA)	Touriste-routier	+ 4h 39' 14"
32	Antonio Prior (ESP)	Spain	+ 4h 51' 06"
33	Aldo Bertocco (FRA)	Touriste-routier	+ 4h 52' 33"
34	Erich Haendel (GER)	German individual	+ 5h 06' 16"
35	Oreste Bernardoni (FRA)	Touriste-routier	+ 5h 12' 28"
36	Louis Thiétard (FRA)	Touriste-routier	+ 5h 12' 47"
37	Charles Berty (FRA)	Touriste-routier	+ 5h 26' 28"
38	Georges Lachat (FRA)	Touriste-routier	+ 5h 27' 50"
39	Vicente Bachero (ESP)	Spanish individual	+ 5h 37' 50"
40	Kurt Stettler (SUI)	Swiss individual	+ 5h 49' 01"
41	Manuel Garcia (FRA)	Touriste-routier	+ 6h 01' 18"
42	Otto Weckerling (GER)	Germany	+ 6h 11' 55"
43	Théodore Ladron (FRA)	Touriste-routier	+ 6h 13' 39"
44	Georges Hubatz (FRA)	Touriste-routier	+ 6h 17' 55"
45	Ferdi Ickes (GER)	German individual	+ 6h 59' 19"
46	Willi Kutschbach (GER)	Germany	+ 7h 40' 39"

=== Mountains classification ===
Mountains in the mountains classification
Stage	Rider	Height	Mountain range	Winner
4	Ballon d'Alsace	1,178 metres (3,865 ft)	Vosges	Felicien Vervaecke
6	Aravis	1,498 metres (4,915 ft)	Alps	René Vietto
7	Galibier	2,556 metres (8,386 ft)	Alps	Gabriel Ruozzi
8	Côte de Laffrey	900 metres (3,000 ft)	Alps	Gabriel Ruozzi
9	Vars	2,110 metres (6,920 ft)	Alps	Felicien Vervaecke
9	Allos	2,250 metres (7,380 ft)	Alps	Felicien Vervaecke
11	Braus	1,002 metres (3,287 ft)	Alps-Maritimes	Gabriel Ruozzi
11	La Turbie	555 metres (1,821 ft)	Alps-Maritimes	Orlando Teani
15	Puymorens	1,920 metres (6,300 ft)	Pyrenees	Felicien Vervaecke
15	Col de Port	1,249 metres (4,098 ft)	Pyrenees	Felicien Vervaecke
15	Portet d'Aspet	1,069 metres (3,507 ft)	Pyrenees	Felicien Vervaecke
16	Peyresourde	1,569 metres (5,148 ft)	Pyrenees	Felicien Vervaecke
16	Aspin	1,489 metres (4,885 ft)	Pyrenees	Felicien Vervaecke
16	Tourmalet	2,115 metres (6,939 ft)	Pyrenees	Sylvère Maes
16	Aubisque	1,709 metres (5,607 ft)	Pyrenees	Ambrogio Morelli

Final mountains classification (1–10)
Rank	Rider	Team	Points
1	Félicien Vervaecke (BEL)	Belgium	118
2	Sylvère Maes (BEL)	Belgian individuals	92
3	Jules Lowie (BEL)	Belgian individuals	71
4	Gabriel Ruozzi (FRA)	Touriste-routier	62
5	Romain Maes (BEL)	Belgium	58
6	Ambrogio Morelli (ITA)	Italian individuals	49
7	Francesco Camusso (ITA)	Italy	47
8	René Vietto (FRA)	France	42
9	Orlando Teani (ITA)	Italian individuals	41
10	Leo Amberg (SUI)	Swiss individuals	33

=== Team classification ===
Final team classification (1–5)
Rank	Team	Time
1	Belgium	425h 36' 09"
2	France	+ 2h 24' 51"
3	Germany	+ 9h 57' 17"
4	Italy	+ 12h 13' 22"
5	Spain	+ 13h 16' 21"

== Aftermath ==
Felicien Vervaecke, who had finished in third place, felt that he could have won this Tour by more than one hour, if he had not been helping his teammate Romain Maes, when Maes was suffering.

== Bibliography ==
- Augendre, Jacques (2016). Guide historique [Historical guide] (PDF) (in French). Paris: Amaury Sport Organisation. Archived (PDF) from the original on 17 August 2016.
- Cornillie, Rik; Vanwalleghem, Rik (2006). Karel van Wijnendaele (in Dutch). Tielt, Belgium: Lannoo Uitgeverij. ISBN 978-90-209-6547-6.
- McGann, Bill; McGann, Carol (2006). The Story of the Tour de France: 1903–1964. Vol. 1. Indianapolis, IN: Dog Ear Publishing. ISBN 978-1-59858-180-5.
- Nauright, John; Parrish, Charles (2012). Sports Around the World: History, Culture, and Practice. Vol. 2. Santa Barbara, CA: ABC-CLIO. ISBN 978-1-59884-300-2.
- Thompson, Christopher S. (2006). The Tour de France: A Cultural History. Oakland, CA: University of California Press. ISBN 978-0-520-24760-4.
