= List of cyclists in the 1941 Vuelta a España =

For the 1941 Vuelta a España, the field consisted of 32 riders; 16 finished the race.

== By rider ==
Legend
No.	Starting number worn by the rider during the Vuelta
Pos.	Position in the general classification
DNF	Denotes a rider who did not finish

No.	Name	Nationality	Pos.
1	Fédérico Ezquerra	Spain	DNF
2	Fermín Trueba	Spain	2
3	Jose Cano	Spain	9
4	Martín Abadía	Spain	DNF
5	Isidro Bejarano	Spain	DNF
6	Julián Berrendero	Spain	1
7	José Botanch	Spain	11
8	Benito Cabestreros	Spain	12
9	José Campama	Spain	DNF
10	Vicente Carretero	Spain	8
11	Miguel Carrion	Spain	13
12	Diego Chafer	Spain	DNF
13	Antonio Escuriet	Spain	6
14	Juan Gimeno	Spain	DNF
15	Candido Gutierrez	Spain	DNF
16	Manuel Izquierdo	Spain	10
17	José Jabardo	Spain	3
18	Claudio Leturiaga	Spain	DNF
19	Antonio Martin	Spain	7
20	Cayetano Martin	Spain	14
21	Antonio Montes	Spain	DNF
22	Fernando Murcia	Spain	DNF
23	Emilio Pérez Carreño	Spain	DNF
24	Delio Rodríguez	Spain	4
25	Antonio Andres Sancho	Spain	5
26	Martín Santos	Spain	16
27	Miguel Monzon	Spain	DNF
28	Agustin Echegaray	Spain	DNF
29	Hans Weber	SUI	DNF
30	Emile Vaucher	SUI	15
31	Ernst Wüthrich	SUI	DNF
32	Fritz Saladin	SUI	DNF
