= 1941 Vuelta a España, Stage 1 to Stage 11 =

Long-distance bicycle race stages

The 1941 Vuelta a España was the 3rd edition of Vuelta a España, one of cycling's Grand Tours. The Tour began in Madrid on 12 June and Stage 11 occurred on 24 June with a stage to Logroño. The race finished in Madrid on 6 July.

== Stage 1 ==
12 June 1941 - Madrid to Salamanca, 210 km (130.5 mi)

Stage 1 result and General Classification after Stage 1

Rank	Rider	Time
1	Julián Berrendero (ESP)	7h 52' 27"
2	Delio Rodríguez (ESP)	+ 14"
3	Fernando Murcia (ESP)	s.t.
4	Vicente Carretero (ESP)	s.t.
5	Antonio Martin (ESP)	s.t.
6	Diego Chafer (ESP)	s.t.
7	Martín Abadía (ESP)	s.t.
8	José Botanch (ESP)	s.t.
9	Emile Vaucher (SUI)	s.t.
10	Fermín Trueba (ESP)	s.t.

== Stage 2 ==
13 June 1941 - Salamanca to Cáceres, 214 km (133.0 mi)

Stage 2 result

Rank	Rider	Time
1	Antonio Montes (ESP)	6h 44' 51"
2	Delio Rodríguez (ESP)	+ 19' 15"
3	Vicente Carretero (ESP)	s.t.
4	Fédérico Ezquerra (ESP)	s.t.
5	José Jabardo (ESP)	s.t.
6	Ernst Wüthrich (SUI)	s.t.
7	Martín Abadía (ESP)	s.t.
8	Benito Cabestreros (ESP)	s.t.
9	Antonio Andres Sancho (ESP)	s.t.
10	Isidro Bejarano (ESP)	s.t.

General classification after Stage 2

Rank	Rider	Time
1	Delio Rodríguez (ESP)	14h 56' 37"
2	Vicente Carretero (ESP)	s.t.
3	Martín Abadía (ESP)	s.t.
4	José Botanch (ESP)	s.t.
5	Emile Vaucher (SUI)	s.t.
6	Fermín Trueba (ESP)	+ 9"
7	Antonio Escuriet (ESP)	+ 14"
8	Fédérico Ezquerra (ESP)	s.t.
9	Ernst Wüthrich (SUI)	s.t.
10	Manuel Izquierdo (ESP)	s.t.

== Stage 3 ==
14 June 1941 - Cáceres to Sevilla, 270 km (170 mi)

Stage 3 result

Rank	Rider	Time
1	Delio Rodríguez (ESP)	9h 46' 01"
2	José Campama (ESP)	s.t.
3	Julián Berrendero (ESP)	s.t.
4	Vicente Carretero (ESP)	s.t.
5	Antonio Martin (ESP)	s.t.
6	Fédérico Ezquerra (ESP)	s.t.
7	Cayetano Martin (ESP)	s.t.
8	Martín Abadía (ESP)	s.t.
9	Juan Gimeno (ESP)	s.t.
10	Manuel Izquierdo (ESP)	s.t.

General classification after Stage 3

Rank	Rider	Time
1	Delio Rodríguez (ESP)	24h 42' 38"
2	Vicente Carretero (ESP)	s.t.
3	Martín Abadía (ESP)	s.t.
4	José Botanch (ESP)	s.t.
5	Emile Vaucher (SUI)	s.t.
6	Fermín Trueba (ESP)	+ 9"
7	Fédérico Ezquerra (ESP)	+ 14"
8	Ernst Wüthrich (SUI)	s.t.
9	Antonio Escuriet (ESP)	s.t.
10	Manuel Izquierdo (ESP)	s.t.

== Stage 4 ==
15 June 1941 - Sevilla to Málaga, 212 km (132 mi)

Stage 4 result

Rank	Rider	Time
1	Antonio Escuriet (ESP)	8h 20' 34"
2	Julián Berrendero (ESP)	s.t.
3	Fermín Trueba (ESP)	s.t.
4	Fédérico Ezquerra (ESP)	s.t.
5	José Jabardo (ESP)	s.t.
6	Antonio Andres Sancho (ESP)	+ 1' 24"
7	Juan Gimeno (ESP)	s.t.
8	Isidro Bejarano (ESP)	+ 1' 29"
9	Jose Cano (ESP)	+ 2' 14"
10	Antonio Martin (ESP)	+ 2' 41"

General classification after Stage 4

Rank	Rider	Time
1	Fermín Trueba (ESP)	33h 03' 11"
2	Fédérico Ezquerra (ESP)	+ 5"
3	Antonio Escuriet (ESP)	s.t.
4	Julián Berrendero (ESP)	+ 23"
5	José Jabardo (ESP)	+ 25"
6	Jose Cano (ESP)	+ 2' 49"
7	Antonio Martin (ESP)	+ 3' 28"
8	Martín Abadía (ESP)	+ 4' 24"
9	Vicente Carretero (ESP)	+ 5' 55"
10	Emile Vaucher (SUI)	+ 8' 13"

== Stage 5 ==
17 June 1941 - Málaga to Almería, 220 km (140 mi)

Stage 5 result

Rank	Rider	Time
1	Delio Rodríguez (ESP)	9h 01' 09"
2	Fermín Trueba (ESP)	s.t.
3	Juan Gimeno (ESP)	s.t.
4	Antonio Martin (ESP)	s.t.
5	Fédérico Ezquerra (ESP)	s.t.
6	Julián Berrendero (ESP)	s.t.
7	Jose Cano (ESP)	s.t.
8	Fritz Saladin (SUI)	s.t.
9	José Botanch (ESP)	s.t.
10	Benito Cabestreros (ESP)	s.t.

General classification after Stage 5

Rank	Rider	Time
1	Fermín Trueba (ESP)	42h 04' 20"
2	Fédérico Ezquerra (ESP)	+ 5"
3	Antonio Escuriet (ESP)	s.t.
4	Julián Berrendero (ESP)	+ 23"
5	José Jabardo (ESP)	+ 25"
6	Jose Cano (ESP)	+ 2' 51"
7	Antonio Martin (ESP)	+ 3' 18"
8	Martín Abadía (ESP)	+ 5' 02"
9	Delio Rodríguez (ESP)	+ 11' 13"
10	Manuel Izquierdo (ESP)	+ 12' 39"

== Stage 6 ==
18 June 1941 - Almería to Murcia, 223 km (139 mi)

Stage 6 result

Rank	Rider	Time
1	Delio Rodríguez (ESP)	7h 38' 59"
2	Fédérico Ezquerra (ESP)	s.t.
3	Vicente Carretero (ESP)	s.t.
4	Juan Gimeno (ESP)	s.t.
5	José Jabardo (ESP)	s.t.
6	Antonio Martin (ESP)	s.t.
7	Fermín Trueba (ESP)	s.t.
8	Jose Cano (ESP)	s.t.
9	José Botanch (ESP)	s.t.
10	Claudio Leturiaga (ESP)	s.t.

General classification after Stage 6

Rank	Rider	Time
1	Fermín Trueba (ESP)	49h 43' 19"
2	Fédérico Ezquerra (ESP)	+ 5"
3	José Jabardo (ESP)	+ 25"
4	Julián Berrendero (ESP)	+ 1' 51"
5	Jose Cano (ESP)	+ 2' 49"
6	Antonio Martin (ESP)	+ 3' 18"
7	Antonio Escuriet (ESP)	+ 4' 08"
8	Martín Abadía (ESP)	+ 9' 05"
9	Delio Rodríguez (ESP)	+ 11' 13"
10	Juan Gimeno (ESP)	+ 14' 55"

== Stage 7 ==
19 June 1941 - Murcia to Valencia, 248 km (154 mi)

Stage 7 result

Rank	Rider	Time
1	Antonio Andres Sancho (ESP)	10h 07' 48"
2	Juan Gimeno (ESP)	+ 1' 22"
3	Delio Rodríguez (ESP)	s.t.
4	Vicente Carretero (ESP)	s.t.
5	José Jabardo (ESP)	s.t.
6	Fermín Trueba (ESP)	s.t.
7	Fédérico Ezquerra (ESP)	s.t.
8	Julián Berrendero (ESP)	s.t.
9	José Botanch (ESP)	s.t.
10	Benito Cabestreros (ESP)	s.t.

General classification after Stage 7

Rank	Rider	Time
1	Fermín Trueba (ESP)	59h 52' 29"
2	Fédérico Ezquerra (ESP)	+ 5"
3	José Jabardo (ESP)	s.t.
4	Julián Berrendero (ESP)	+ 1' 35"
5	Jose Cano (ESP)	+ 2' 49"
6	Antonio Martin (ESP)	+ 3' 18"
7	Antonio Escuriet (ESP)	+ 4' 08"
8	Delio Rodríguez (ESP)	+ 11' 13"
9	Juan Gimeno (ESP)	+ 14' 55"
10	Vicente Carretero (ESP)	+ 16' 31"

== Stage 8 ==
21 June 1941 - Valencia to Tarragona, 279 km (173 mi)

Stage 8 result

Rank	Rider	Time
1	Fermín Trueba (ESP)	9h 20' 22"
2	Vicente Carretero (ESP)	s.t.
3	Julián Berrendero (ESP)	s.t.
4	Fédérico Ezquerra (ESP)	s.t.
5	Antonio Andres Sancho (ESP)	s.t.
6	Antonio Martin (ESP)	s.t.
7	Jose Cano (ESP)	s.t.
8	José Botanch (ESP)	s.t.
9	Benito Cabestreros (ESP)	s.t.
10	Antonio Escuriet (ESP)	s.t.

General classification after Stage 8

Rank	Rider	Time
1	Fermín Trueba (ESP)	69h 12' 51"
2	Fédérico Ezquerra (ESP)	+ 5"
3	José Jabardo (ESP)	+ 25"
4	Julián Berrendero (ESP)	+ 1' 51"
5	Jose Cano (ESP)	+ 2' 49"
6	Antonio Martin (ESP)	+ 3' 18"
7	Antonio Escuriet (ESP)	+ 4' 08"
8	Juan Gimeno (ESP)	+ 14' 55"
9	Vicente Carretero (ESP)	+ 16' 32"
10	Manuel Izquierdo (ESP)	+ 16' 42"

== Stage 9 ==
22 June 1941 - Tarragona to Barcelona, 112 km (70 mi)

Stage 9 result

Rank	Rider	Time
1	Antonio Martin (ESP)	3h 34' 02"
2	Fédérico Ezquerra (ESP)	s.t.
3	Julián Berrendero (ESP)	s.t.
4	Antonio Andres Sancho (ESP)	s.t.
5	Emile Vaucher (SUI)	s.t.
6	Fermín Trueba (ESP)	s.t.
7	José Jabardo (ESP)	s.t.
8	José Botanch (ESP)	s.t.
9	Delio Rodríguez (ESP)	+ 1' 08"
10	Antonio Escuriet (ESP)	s.t.

General classification after Stage 9

Rank	Rider	Time
1	Fermín Trueba (ESP)	72h 46' 53"
2	Fédérico Ezquerra (ESP)	+ 5"
3	José Jabardo (ESP)	+ 25"
4	Julián Berrendero (ESP)	+ 1' 51"
5	Antonio Martin (ESP)	+ 3' 18"
6	Antonio Escuriet (ESP)	+ 5' 09"
7	Jose Cano (ESP)	+ 6' 37"
8	Manuel Izquierdo (ESP)	+ 17' 50"
9	Antonio Andres Sancho (ESP)	+ 18' 00"
10	Vicente Carretero (ESP)	+ 22' 07"

== Stage 10 ==
23 June 1941 - Barcelona to Zaragoza, 294 km (183 mi)

== Stage 11 ==
24 June 1941 - Zaragoza to Logroño, 172 km (107 mi)

Stage 11 result

Rank	Rider	Time
1	Delio Rodríguez (ESP)	5h 56' 45"
2	Vicente Carretero (ESP)	s.t.
3	Miguel Carrion (ESP)	s.t.
4	Julián Berrendero (ESP)	s.t.
5	Antonio Martin (ESP)	s.t.
6	Juan Gimeno (ESP)	s.t.
7	Manuel Izquierdo (ESP)	s.t.
8	Fermín Trueba (ESP)	s.t.
9	Antonio Escuriet (ESP)	s.t.
10	Antonio Andres Sancho (ESP)	s.t.

General classification after Stage 11

Rank	Rider	Time
1	Fermín Trueba (ESP)	89h 55' 59"
2	José Jabardo (ESP)	+ 1' 15"
3	Julián Berrendero (ESP)	+ 1' 41"
4	Antonio Martin (ESP)	+ 3' 08"
5	Antonio Escuriet (ESP)	+ 5' 36"
6	Jose Cano (ESP)	+ 7' 13"
7	Manuel Izquierdo (ESP)	+ 17' 40"
8	Antonio Andres Sancho (ESP)	+ 17' 54"
9	Fédérico Ezquerra (ESP)	+ 19' 48"
10	Delio Rodríguez (ESP)	+ 25' 01"
