= 1941 Vuelta a España, Stage 12 to Stage 21 =

Long-distance bicycle race stages

The 1941 Vuelta a España marked the third edition of one of cycling’s most prestigious Grand Tours, taking place during a difficult period in Spain’s history, shortly after the end of the Spanish Civil War. Despite the challenges facing the country at the time, the race symbolized resilience and a return to national sporting events.

The competition began in Madrid on 12 June 1941, setting the stage for a demanding multi-stage journey across Spain. Riders faced long distances, unpredictable weather, and rough road conditions—far more challenging than modern cycling surfaces. The peloton traveled through various regions, giving spectators across the country a rare opportunity to witness top-level sport during a time of recovery and rebuilding.

One of the notable moments in the race came on 25 June, during Stage 12, which included a route from Logroño, a city in the La Rioja region known for its rolling terrain and demanding roads. Stages like this tested not only the physical endurance of cyclists but also their tactical awareness, as positioning and energy conservation were crucial for success.

The race continued for several weeks, gradually pushing the riders to their limits. Each stage brought new challenges—from mountainous stretches to long flat sections where speed and teamwork played a decisive role. Riders had to rely heavily on their own stamina, as support technology and team strategies were far less advanced than they are today.

Finally, after weeks of intense competition, the Vuelta concluded where it had begun—back in Madrid on 6 July 1941. Finishing in the capital gave the race a sense of completion and celebration, drawing crowds eager to see the cyclists who had endured the grueling journey across the country.

Overall, the 1941 Vuelta a España was more than just a sporting event; it was a testament to determination and the enduring appeal of cycling. It helped lay the foundation for what would become one of the most important races in the world, continuing to grow in prestige and global recognition in the decades that followed.

== Stage 12 ==
25 June 1941 - Logroño to San Sebastián, 213 km (132.4 mi)

Stage 12 result

Rank	Rider	Time
1	Delio Rodríguez (ESP)	7h 27' 27"
2	Vicente Carretero (ESP)	s.t.
3	Fermín Trueba (ESP)	s.t.
4	José Jabardo (ESP)	s.t.
5	Antonio Escuriet (ESP)	s.t.
6	Miguel Carrion (ESP)	s.t.
7	Benito Cabestreros (ESP)	s.t.
8	Julián Berrendero (ESP)	s.t.
9	Antonio Andres Sancho (ESP)	s.t.
10	Isidro Bejarano (ESP)	s.t.

General classification after Stage 12

Rank	Rider	Time
1	Fermín Trueba (ESP)	97h 21' 16"
2	José Jabardo (ESP)	+ 3' 25"
3	Julián Berrendero (ESP)	+ 3' 51"
4	Antonio Martin (ESP)	+ 5' 18"
5	Antonio Escuriet (ESP)	+ 7' 46"
6	Jose Cano (ESP)	+ 17' 36"
7	Manuel Izquierdo (ESP)	+ 19' 50"
8	Antonio Andres Sancho (ESP)	+ 20' 00"
9	Fédérico Ezquerra (ESP)	+ 21' 58"
10	Delio Rodríguez (ESP)	+ 27' 11"

== Stage 13 ==
26 June 1941 - San Sebastián to Bilbao, 160 km (99 mi)

Stage 13 result

Rank	Rider	Time
1	Fédérico Ezquerra (ESP)	6h 18' 46"
2	Julián Berrendero (ESP)	s.t.
3	Delio Rodríguez (ESP)	s.t.
4	Antonio Martin (ESP)	+ 24"
5	Fermín Trueba (ESP)	s.t.
6	Antonio Andres Sancho (ESP)	s.t.
7	Manuel Izquierdo (ESP)	s.t.
8	José Botanch (ESP)	s.t.
9	Vicente Carretero (ESP)	+ 58"
10	José Jabardo (ESP)	+ 1' 01"

General classification after Stage 13

Rank	Rider	Time
1	Fermín Trueba (ESP)	103h 42' 26"
2	Julián Berrendero (ESP)	+ 1' 27"
3	José Jabardo (ESP)	+ 2' 02"
4	Antonio Martin (ESP)	+ 3' 18"
5	Antonio Escuriet (ESP)	+ 6' 35"
6	Manuel Izquierdo (ESP)	+ 18' 00"
7	Antonio Andres Sancho (ESP)	s.t.
8	Fédérico Ezquerra (ESP)	+ 19' 34"
9	Delio Rodríguez (ESP)	+ 24' 47"
10	Jose Cano (ESP)	+ 27' 11"

== Stage 14 ==
28 June 1941 - Bilbao to Santander, 165 km (103 mi)

Stage 14 result

Rank	Rider	Time
1	Fermín Trueba (ESP)	8h 32' 39"
2	Fédérico Ezquerra (ESP)	+ 2' 09"
3	Delio Rodríguez (ESP)	s.t.
4	Julián Berrendero (ESP)	+ 24"
5	José Jabardo (ESP)	s.t.
6	Jose Cano (ESP)	+ 7' 33"
7	Vicente Carretero (ESP)	+ 13' 48"
8	Antonio Martin (ESP)	s.t.
9	Antonio Andres Sancho (ESP)	s.t.

General classification after Stage 14

Rank	Rider	Time
1	Fermín Trueba (ESP)	112h 12' 05"
2	Julián Berrendero (ESP)	+ 6' 36"
3	José Jabardo (ESP)	+ 7' 11"
4	Antonio Martin (ESP)	+ 20' 06"
5	Antonio Escuriet (ESP)	+ 23' 23"
6	Fédérico Ezquerra (ESP)	+ 24' 43"
7	Delio Rodríguez (ESP)	+ 29' 56"
8	Antonio Andres Sancho (ESP)	+ 34' 48"
9	Jose Cano (ESP)	+ 37' 44"
10	Vicente Carretero (ESP)	+ 53' 01"

== Stage 15 ==
29 June 1941 - Santander to Gijón, 192 km (119 mi)

Stage 15 result

Rank	Rider	Time
1	Delio Rodríguez (ESP)	7h 37' 00"
2	Julián Berrendero (ESP)	s.t.
3	Fermín Trueba (ESP)	s.t.
4	Antonio Andres Sancho (ESP)	s.t.
5	José Botanch (ESP)	s.t.
6	Antonio Escuriet (ESP)	s.t.
7	Manuel Izquierdo (ESP)	s.t.
8	José Jabardo (ESP)	s.t.
9	Jose Cano (ESP)	s.t.
10	Benito Cabestreros (ESP)	s.t.

== Stage 16a ==
30 June 1941 - Gijón to Oviedo, 53 km (33 mi) (ITT)

Stage 16a result

Rank	Rider	Time
1	Delio Rodríguez (ESP)	1h 53' 59"
2	Antonio Andres Sancho (ESP)	+ 44"
3	Julián Berrendero (ESP)	+ 1' 13"
4	Antonio Escuriet (ESP)	+ 5' 23"
5	Fermín Trueba (ESP)	+ 5' 26"
6	José Jabardo (ESP)	+ 6' 39"
7	Vicente Carretero (ESP)	+ 8' 44"
8	Benito Cabestreros (ESP)	+ 14' 11"
9	José Botanch (ESP)	+ 14' 19"
10	Miguel Carrion (ESP)	+ 15' 02"

General classification after Stage 16a

Rank	Rider	Time
1	Julián Berrendero (ESP)	121h 50' 53"
2	Fermín Trueba (ESP)	+ 36"
3	José Jabardo (ESP)	+ 6' 01"
4	Antonio Escuriet (ESP)	+ 18' 57"
5	Delio Rodríguez (ESP)	+ 22' 07"
6	Antonio Martin (ESP)	+ 22' 39"
7	Antonio Andres Sancho (ESP)	+ 27' 45"
8	Jose Cano (ESP)	+ 47' 02"
9	Vicente Carretero (ESP)	+ 58' 17"
10	Manuel Izquierdo (ESP)	+ 1h 03' 02"

== Stage 16b ==
30 June 1941 - Oviedo to Luarca, 101 km (63 mi)

== Stage 17 ==
1 July 1941 - Luarca to A Coruña, 219 km (136 mi)

Stage 17 result

Rank	Rider	Time
1	Delio Rodríguez (ESP)	7h 50' 32"
2	Vicente Carretero (ESP)	s.t.
3	Fermín Trueba (ESP)	s.t.
4	José Jabardo (ESP)	s.t.
5	Antonio Andres Sancho (ESP)	s.t.
6	Julián Berrendero (ESP)	s.t.
7	José Botanch (ESP)	s.t.
8	Antonio Escuriet (ESP)	s.t.
9	Jose Cano (ESP)	s.t.
10	Benito Cabestreros (ESP)	+ 40"

General classification after Stage 17

Rank	Rider	Time
1	Julián Berrendero (ESP)	133h 29' 27"
2	Fermín Trueba (ESP)	+ 36"
3	José Jabardo (ESP)	+ 5' 41"
4	Antonio Escuriet (ESP)	+ 19' 37"
5	Delio Rodríguez (ESP)	+ 21' 37"
6	Antonio Andres Sancho (ESP)	+ 27' 45"
7	Antonio Martin (ESP)	+ 33' 00"
8	Jose Cano (ESP)	+ 37' 42"
9	Vicente Carretero (ESP)	+ 53' 56"
10	Manuel Izquierdo (ESP)	+ 1h 08' 30"

== Stage 18 ==
2 July 1941 - A Coruña to Vigo, 175 km (109 mi)

Stage 18 result

Rank	Rider	Time
1	Delio Rodríguez (ESP)	7h 29' 54"
2	Antonio Martin (ESP)	s.t.
3	Vicente Carretero (ESP)	s.t.
4	Fermín Trueba (ESP)	s.t.
5	Cayetano Martin (ESP)	s.t.
6	Miguel Carrion (ESP)	s.t.
7	José Jabardo (ESP)	s.t.
8	Julián Berrendero (ESP)	s.t.
9	Martín Santos (ESP)	s.t.
10	Jose Cano (ESP)	s.t.

General classification after Stage 18

Rank	Rider	Time
1	Julián Berrendero (ESP)	140h 59' 21"
2	Fermín Trueba (ESP)	+ 36"
3	José Jabardo (ESP)	+ 6' 01"
4	Antonio Escuriet (ESP)	+ 19' 37"
5	Delio Rodríguez (ESP)	+ 21' 57"
6	Antonio Andres Sancho (ESP)	+ 27' 45"
7	Antonio Martin (ESP)	+ 33' 00"
8	Jose Cano (ESP)	+ 47' 42"
9	Vicente Carretero (ESP)	+ 53' 56"
10	Manuel Izquierdo (ESP)	+ 1h 08' 30"

== Stage 19 ==
4 July 1941 - Vigo to Verín, 178 km (111 mi)

Stage 19 result

Rank	Rider	Time
1	Delio Rodríguez (ESP)	7h 02' 52"
2	Vicente Carretero (ESP)	s.t.
3	Julián Berrendero (ESP)	s.t.
4	Antonio Martin (ESP)	s.t.
5	Fermín Trueba (ESP)	s.t.
6	José Jabardo (ESP)	s.t.
7	Antonio Escuriet (ESP)	s.t.
8	Antonio Andres Sancho (ESP)	s.t.
9	Benito Cabestreros (ESP)	s.t.
10	Jose Cano (ESP)	s.t.

General classification after Stage 19

Rank	Rider	Time
1	Julián Berrendero (ESP)	148h 23' 13"
2	Fermín Trueba (ESP)	+ 36"
3	José Jabardo (ESP)	+ 6' 01"
4	Antonio Escuriet (ESP)	+ 19' 37"
5	Delio Rodríguez (ESP)	+ 22' 07"
6	Antonio Andres Sancho (ESP)	+ 27' 45"
7	Antonio Martin (ESP)	+ 33' 00"
8	Jose Cano (ESP)	+ 47' 42"
9	Vicente Carretero (ESP)	+ 53' 56"
10	Manuel Izquierdo (ESP)	+ 1h 10' 30"

== Stage 20 ==
5 July 1941 - Verín to Valladolid, 301 km (187 mi)

Stage 20 result

Rank	Rider	Time
1	Julián Berrendero (ESP)	13h 14' 24"
2	Delio Rodríguez (ESP)	+ 31"
3	Vicente Carretero (ESP)	s.t.
4	Miguel Carrion (ESP)	s.t.
5	Antonio Martin (ESP)	s.t.
6	José Jabardo (ESP)	s.t.
7	Fermín Trueba (ESP)	s.t.
8	Antonio Andres Sancho (ESP)	s.t.
9	Jose Cano (ESP)	s.t.
10	Martín Santos (ESP)	s.t.

General classification after Stage 20

Rank	Rider	Time
1	Julián Berrendero (ESP)	161h 37' 37"
2	Fermín Trueba (ESP)	+ 1' 07"
3	José Jabardo (ESP)	+ 6' 27"
4	Delio Rodríguez (ESP)	+ 22' 38"
5	Antonio Escuriet (ESP)	+ 25' 00"
6	Antonio Andres Sancho (ESP)	+ 28' 16"
7	Antonio Martin (ESP)	+ 33' 31"
8	Jose Cano (ESP)	+ 48' 13"
9	Vicente Carretero (ESP)	+ 54' 27"
10	Manuel Izquierdo (ESP)	+ 1h 11' 38"

== Stage 21 ==
6 July 1941 - Valladolid to Madrid, 198 km (123 mi)

Stage 21 result

Rank	Rider	Time
1	Vicente Carretero (ESP)	7h 07' 49"
2	Julián Berrendero (ESP)	s.t.
3	Fermín Trueba (ESP)	s.t.
4	José Jabardo (ESP)	s.t.
5	Delio Rodríguez (ESP)	+ 6' 39"
6	Miguel Carrion (ESP)	+ 6' 56"
7	Antonio Andres Sancho (ESP)	+ 7' 24"
8	Martín Santos (ESP)	+ 10' 57"
9	Antonio Escuriet (ESP)	s.t.
10	Benito Cabestreros (ESP)	s.t.

General classification after Stage 21

Rank	Rider	Time
1	Julián Berrendero (ESP)	168h 45' 26"
2	Fermín Trueba (ESP)	+ 1' 07"
3	José Jabardo (ESP)	+ 5' 52"
4	Delio Rodríguez (ESP)	+ 28' 47"
5	Antonio Andres Sancho (ESP)	+ 35' 40"
6	Antonio Escuriet (ESP)	+ 35' 57"
7	Antonio Martin (ESP)	+ 46' 04"
8	Vicente Carretero (ESP)	+ 54' 25"
9	Jose Cano (ESP)	+ 1h 05' 40"
10	Manuel Izquierdo (ESP)	+ 1h 23' 53"
