= Antonio Andrés Sancho =

Spanish cyclist (1913–1985)

Personal information
- Full name: Francisco Antonio Andrés Sancho
- Born: 27 April 1913 Aras de los Olmos, Spain
- Died: 24 January 1985 (aged 71) Valencia, Spain

Cycling career
- Sport: Cycling
- Discipline: Road
- Role: Rider

Major wins
- Grand Tours Vuelta a España 3 individual stages (1941, 1942, 1946) Stage races Volta a Catalunya (1941) One-day races and Classics National Road Race Championships (1939, 1941)

Francisco Antonio Andrés Sancho (27 April 1913 – 24 January 1985) was a Spanish professional road racing cyclist. Professional from 1935 to 1947, he won the Spanish National Road Race Championships, the Volta a Catalunya and three stages of the Vuelta a España, in addition to numerous other races.

== Major results ==
1935
4th Overall Volta a Catalunya
1939
1st National Road Race Championships
1st Overall Vuelta a Aragón

1st Stages 1 & 5

7th Overall Volta a Catalunya
1940
1st Overall Trofeo Masferrer

1st Stage 1a

2nd Overall Vuelta a Cantabria
7th Overall Volta a Catalunya
1941
1st National Road Race Championships
1st Overall Volta a Catalunya
2nd Trofeo Masferrer
5th Overall Vuelta a España

1st Stage 7

1942
2nd National Road Race Championships
3rd Trofeo Masferrer
3rd Overall Vuelta a España

1st Stage 14

1943
1st Overall Vuelta a Levante
2nd Overall Trofeo Masferrer
1944
1st Overall Trofeo Masferrer

1st Stage 1b

1946
2nd National Road Race Championships
7th Overall Vuelta a España

1st Stage 2b
