= 1936 Volta a Catalunya =

Race details
- Dates: 13–21 June 1936
- Stages: 9
- Distance: 1,536 km (954.4 mi)
- Winning time: 48h 20' 21"

Results
	Winner	Mariano Cañardo (ESP)
	Second	Frans Bonduel (BEL)
	Third	Juan Gimeno (ESP)

The 1936 Volta a Catalunya was the 18th edition of the Volta a Catalunya cycle race and was held from 13 June to 21 June 1936. The race started and finished in Barcelona. The race was won by Mariano Cañardo.

== Route and stages ==
List of stages
Stage	Date	Course	Distance	Winner
1	13 June	Barcelona to Manlleu	116 km (72 mi)	Antonio Destrieux (ESP)
2	14 June	Manlleu to Girona	185 km (115 mi)	Joseph Huts (BEL)
3	15 June	Girona to Figueres	165 km (103 mi)	Joseph Huts (BEL)
4	16 June	Figueres to Manresa	246 km (153 mi)	Mariano Cañardo (ESP)
5	17 June	Manresa to Lleida	162 km (101 mi)	Federico Ezquerra (ESP)
6	18 June	Lleida to Valls	174 km (108 mi)	Mariano Cañardo (ESP)
7	19 June	Valls to Tarragona	237 km (147 mi)	Frans Bonduel (BEL)
8	20 June	Tarragona to Vilafranca del Penedès	149 km (93 mi)	Mariano Cañardo (ESP)
9	21 June	Vilafranca del Penedès to Barcelona	139 km (86 mi)	Federico Ezquerra (ESP)
	Total		1,573 km (977 mi)	

== General classification ==
Final general classification

Rank	Rider	Time
1	Mariano Cañardo (ESP)	48h 20' 21"
2	Frans Bonduel (BEL)	+ 2' 22"
3	Juan Gimeno (ESP)	+ 7' 40"
4	Diego Cháfer (ESP)	+ 11' 12"
5	Fédérico Ezquerra (ESP)	+ 17' 39"
6	Antonio Destrieux (ESP)	+ 26' 14"
7	Manuel Izquierdo (ESP)	+ 30' 55"
8	Antonio Escuriet (ESP)	+ 36' 08"
9	José Botanch (ESP)	+ 37' 23"
10	Juan Pages (ESP)	+ 47' 32"
