= 1941 Volta a Catalunya =

Race details
- Dates: 6–14 September 1941
- Stages: 10
- Distance: 1,227 km (762.4 mi)
- Winning time: 38h 09' 41"

Results
	Winner	Antonio Andrés (ESP)
	Second	Andreu Canals (ESP)
	Third	Josep Campamà (ESP)

The 1941 Volta a Catalunya was the 21st edition of the Volta a Catalunya cycle race and was held from 6 to 12 September 1941. The race started and finished in Barcelona. The race was won by Antonio Andrés.

== Route and stages ==
List of stages
Stage	Date	Course	Distance	Winner
1	6 September	Barcelona International Exposition	60 km (37 mi)	Joaquín Olmos (ESP)
2	7 September	Barcelona to Vilafranca del Penedès	68 km (42 mi)	Bartomeu Flaquer (ESP)
3	7 September	Vilafranca del Penedès to Tarragona (ITT)	51 km (32 mi)	Antonio Andrés (ESP)
4	8 September	Tarragona to Tortosa	97 km (60 mi)	Delio Rodríguez (ESP)
5	9 September	Tortosa to Vilanova de Bellpuig	181 km (112 mi)	Delio Rodríguez (ESP)
6	10 September	Vilanova de Bellpuig to Manresa	157 km (98 mi)	Delio Rodríguez (ESP)
7	11 September	Manresa to Olot	132 km (82 mi)	Fermín Trueba (ESP)
8	12 September	Olot to Girona	125 km (78 mi)	Antonio Martín (ESP)
9 (A)	13 September	Girona to Palamós (TTT)	48 km (30 mi)	Mariano Cañardo (ESP)
9 (B)	13 September	Palamós to Figueres	79 km (49 mi)	Delio Rodríguez (ESP)
10	14 September	Figueres to Barcelona	216 km (134 mi)	Delio Rodríguez (ESP)
	Total		1,214 km (754 mi)	

== General classification ==
Final general classification

Rank	Rider	Time
1	Antonio Andrés (ESP)	38h 09' 41"
2	Andreu Canals (ESP)	+ 2' 24"
3	Josep Campamà (ESP)	+ 4' 16"
4	Julián Berrendero (ESP)	+ 4' 19"
5	Federico Ezquerra (ESP)	+ 4' 20"
6	Martín Abadía (ESP)	+ 4' 26"
7	Antonio Martín (ESP)	+ 6' 41"
8	Isidro Bejerano (ESP)	+ 12' 12"
9	Joaquín Olmos (ESP)	+ 13' 13"
10	Delio Rodríguez (ESP)	+ 13' 29"
