= 1939 Volta a Catalunya =

Race details
- Dates: 17–24 September 1939
- Stages: 7
- Distance: 928 km (577 mi)
- Winning time: 27h 01' 28"

Results
	Winner	Mariano Cañardo (ESP)
	Second	Diego Cháfer (ESP)
	Third	Fermín Trueba (ESP)

The 1939 Volta a Catalunya was the 19th edition of the Volta a Catalunya cycle race and was held from 17 September to 24 September 1939. The race started and finished in Barcelona. The race was won by Mariano Cañardo.

== Route and stages ==
List of stages
Stage	Date	Course	Distance	Winner
1	17 September	Barcelona to Valls	132 km (82 mi)	Mariano Cañardo (ESP)
2	18 September	Valls to Igualada	135 km (84 mi)	Mariano Cañardo (ESP)
3	19 September	Igualada to Girona	170 km (106 mi)	Mariano Cañardo (ESP)
4	20 September	Girona to Sant Feliu de Guíxols (ITT)	73 km (45 mi)	Diego Cháfer (ESP)
	21 September	Sant Feliu de Guíxols		Rest day
5	22 September	Sant Feliu de Guíxols to Terrassa	146 km (91 mi)	Antonio Escuriet (ESP)
6	23 September	Terrassa to Manresa	174 km (108 mi)	Fermín Trueba (ESP)
7	24 September	Manresa to Barcelona	127 km (79 mi)	Mariano Cañardo (ESP)
	Total		957 km (595 mi)	

== General classification ==
Final general classification

Rank	Rider	Time
1	Mariano Cañardo (ESP)	27h 01' 28"
2	Diego Cháfer (ESP)	+ 6' 39"
3	Fermín Trueba (ESP)	+ 15' 51"
4	José Botanch (ESP)	+ 23' 36"
5	Antonio Escuriet (ESP)	+ 23' 43"
6	Delio Rodríguez (ESP)	+ 25' 19"
7	Antonio Andrés Sancho (ESP)	+ 36' 15"
8	Joaquín Olmos (ESP)	+ 40' 30"
9	Josep Casamada (ESP)	+ 51' 30"
10	Carles Ferré (ESP)	+ 1h 07' 48"
