= Fermín Trueba =

Spanish cyclist (1914–2007)

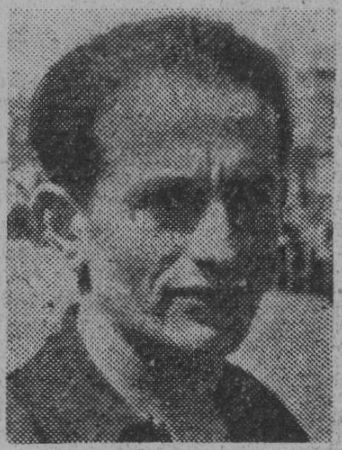

Personal information
- Full name: Fermín Trueba Pérez
- Born: 26 August 1914 Torrelavega, Spain
- Died: 1 May 2007 (aged 92) Madrid, Spain

Cycling career
- Sport: Cycling
- Discipline: Road
- Role: Rider

Professional teams
- 1934–1935: BH
- 1943: CF Barcelona
- 1946: Chicles–Tabay

Major wins
- Grand Tours Vuelta a España Mountains classification (1941) 3 individual stages (1936, 1941) One-day races and Classics National Road Race Championships (1938)

Fermín Trueba Pérez (26 August 1914 – 1 May 2007) was a Spanish road cyclist.

His brothers Vicente and José were also professional cyclists.

== Major results ==
1934
1st Subida a Santo Domingo
1st Vuelta a Alava
2nd Prueba Villafranca de Ordizia
1935
1st Subida a Arantzazu
2nd Overall Tour of Galicia

1st Stages 3 & 9

2nd Subida a Santo Domingo
7th Overall Tour of the Basque Country
7th Clásica a los Puertos de Guadarrama
1936
2nd Clásica a los Puertos de Guadarrama
9th Overall Vuelta a España

1st Stage 19

1938
1st Road race, National Road Championships
1st Subida a Santo Domingo
1939
1st Clásica a los Puertos de Guadarrama
1st Subida a Santo Domingo
2nd Overall Vuelta a Aragón

1st Stages 3, 4 & 6

3rd Road race, National Road Championships
3rd Overall Volta a Catalunya

1st Stage 6

3rd Overall Circuito del Norte

1st Stages 1 & 5

1940
1st Hill-climb, National Road Championships
1st Overall Vuelta a Cantabria

1st Mountains classification
1st Stages 2 & 3

1st Subida a Santo Domingo
1st Subida a Arantzazu
2nd GP Pascuas
2nd GP Vizcaya
6th Overall Volta a Catalunya
6th Clásica a los Puertos de Guadarrama
1941
2nd Overall Vuelta a España

1st Mountains classification
1st Stages 8 & 14

1st Hill-climb, National Road Championships
1st Stage 7 Volta a Catalunya
1st Stage 1 Vuelta Ciclista a Navarra
1st Overall Circuito del Norte

1st Stage 8

2nd Subida a Santo Domingo
1942
1st Hill-climb, National Road Championships
1st Subida a Santo Domingo
1st Subida al Naranco
2nd Overall Circuito del Norte

1st Stages 4, 5b & 8

1943
1st Overall Circuito Castilla-León-Asturias

1st Stages 1, 6 & 7

1st Subida a Santo Domingo
1st Stage 5 Vuelta a la Comunidad Valenciana
1st Stage 5 GP Ayutamiento de Bilbao
2nd Subida a Arantzazu
5th Overall Volta a Catalunya

1st Stage 4b

3rd Subida al Naranco
1944
1st Hill-climb, National Road Championships
1st Stage 9 Volta a Catalunya
1st Subida a Arantzazu
2nd Subida al Naranco
2nd Subida a Santo Domingo
3rd Circuito de Getxo
1945
1st Subida al Naranco
1st Stage 2 Circuito del Norte
2nd Circuito de Getxo
2nd Subida a Santo Domingo
2nd Subida a Arantzazu
3rd Subida a Arrate
5th Overall Tour of Galicia
1946
1st Subida al Naranco
