= José Jabardo =

Spanish cyclist (1915–1986)

Personal information
- Full name: José Jabardo Zaragoza
- Born: 3 February 1915 Azuqueca de Henares, Spain
- Died: 12 April 1986 (aged 69) Benidorm, Spain

Cycling career
- Sport: Cycling
- Discipline: Road
- Role: Rider

Major wins
- Grand Tours Vuelta a España 1 individual stage (1942)

José Jabardo Zaragoza (3 February 1915 - 12 April 1986) was a Spanish professional road racing cyclist. He won a stage of the 1942 Vuelta a España, which was his only professional victory. He also finished third overall in the previous edition of the race.

== Major results ==
1941
2nd Overall Vuelta a Navarra
3rd Overall Vuelta a España
1942
3rd Subida al Naranco
6th Overall Vuelta a España

1st Stage 3
