= Antonio Martín Eguia =

Spanish cyclist (born 1918)

Antonio Martín
Personal information
- Full name: Antonio Martín Eguia
- Born: 18 June 1918 Vitoria-Gasteiz, Basque Country, Spain

Cycling career
- Sport: Cycling
- Disciplines: Road, track
- Role: Rider

Professional teams
- 1939–1945: Individual
- 1946: Pirelli and Individual
- 1947: Individual
- 1948: Insecticidas Z.Z.

Major wins
- 1 stage Vuelta a España

Antonio Martín (born 18 June 1918) is a Spanish former professional cyclist. Martín was professional between 1939 and 1948, earning 13 professional victories, including a stage of the Vuelta a España. He also competed in the Vuelta a España five times (1941, 1942, 1945, 1946, 1948).

== Biography ==
Antonio Martín was born in Vitoria-Gasteiz, Basque Country on 18 June 1918. At the end of the 1948 season, he retired from cycling. He was known as a climbing specialist, and finished in the top 10 of the Vuelta a España twice, and won a stage in 1941.

== Major results ==
1939
3rd Barcelona-Madrid
4th Clásica a los Puertos
1940
1st Álava
2nd Clásica a los Puertos
8th Overall Volta a Catalunya
1941
1st Stage 5 Vuelta a Navarra
2nd Road race, National Road Championships
7th Overall Vuelta a España

1st Stage 9

7th Overall Volta a Catalunya

1st Stage 9

1942
1st Derny, National Track Championships
1st Overall Circuito Castilla-Leon-Asturias

1st Stage 2

1st Stage 3 Vuelta a Levante
1st Stage 3 Circuito del Norte
9th Subida al Naranco
1943
1st Derny, National Track Championships
3rd Road race, National Road Championships
4th Overall Vuelta a Levante

1st Stages 1 & 6

10th Overall Volta a Catalunya
1944
1st Overall Vuelta a Levante

1st Stage 7

1st Road race, Barcelona Road Championships
2nd Road race, National Road Championships
1945
1st Stage 1b Volta a Catalunya
2nd Trofeo Jaumendreu
2nd Trofeo Masferrer
5th Overall Vuelta a España
1946
3rd Trofeo del Sprint
7th Trofeo Masferrer
1947
4th Overall Tour of Galicia

1st Stage 8

=== Vuelta a España results ===
- 1941: 7
- 1942: DNF
- 1943: 5
- 1946: 16
- 1948: DNF
