= Azul y Negro =

Spanish synthpop duo

Azul y Negro is a Spanish synthpop music duo that was founded in 1981 by Carlos García-Vaso, a multi instrumentalist, songwriter and producer, and Joaquín Montoya: (b. 1950 Cartagena).

== Career ==
Azul y Negro were pioneers of synth and electropop in Spain. The debut album La Edad De Los Colores was released in 1981. The year after, the album La Noche (The Night) was released, followed by the better known Digital. An international chart release, it was an instant chart success. The single "Me Estoy Volviendo Loco" (meaning Going Crazy) taken from the album became a hit in Europe, Japan, United States and Australia. Digital, a collection from the first two albums, included songs like "No Tengo Tiempo", "La Torre de Madrid", "La Noche (Let's Spend the Night Together)".

== Discography ==
- 1981: La Edad de Los Colores
- 1982: La Noche
- 1982: Isadora
- 1983: Digital
- 1984: Suspense
- 1985: Mercado Común
- 1986: Babel
- 1993: De Vuelta al Futuro
- 1996: De Vuelta al Futuro II
- 2002: Recuerda
- 2002: Mare Nostrum
- 2003: ISS (Incursión Sonora Surround) (2 versions)
- 2005: VOX
- 2005: El Color de los Éxitos
- 2007: Makes Me Happy
- 2008: Déjà Vu
- 2009: Retrospective
- 2011: Vision
- 2012: Crystalline World
- 2014: Silencio de Metal
- 2015: Locations
- 2016: Dicromo (1981–1986)
