= Volta a la Comunitat Valenciana =

Road cycling stage

Race details
- Date: Early February
- Region: Valencian Community, Spain
- English name: Tour of the Valencian Community
- Local name(s): Volta a la Comunitat Valenciana (Valencian); Vuelta a la Comunidad Valenciana (in Spanish)
- Discipline: Road race
- Competition: UCI Europe Tour
- Type: Stage race
- Web site: vueltacv.com

History
- First edition: 1929
- Editions: 77 (as of 2026)
- First winner: Salvador Cardona (ESP)
- Most wins: Alejandro Valverde (ESP) (3 wins)
- Most recent: Remco Evenepoel (BEL)

The Volta a la Comunitat Valenciana (Valencian pronunciation: [ˈvɔlta a la komuniˈtad valensiˈana]; English: Tour of the Valencian Community or Tour of Valencia) is a road cycling stage race held in the Valencian Community (Comunitat Valenciana), Spain. Its position in the cycling calendar means it is often used as preparation for the spring classics or the Grand Tours which take place later in the season.

No editions of the race were held between 2008 and 2015 because of funding issues. A first attempt to revive it for the 2010–11 UCI Europe Tour was unsuccessful. During 2015 a second attempt was started by Ángel Casero and his brother Rafael. In September the UCI granted the race a 2.1 status and made way for the return of the race which took place in early February. The race became part of the new UCI ProSeries in 2020.

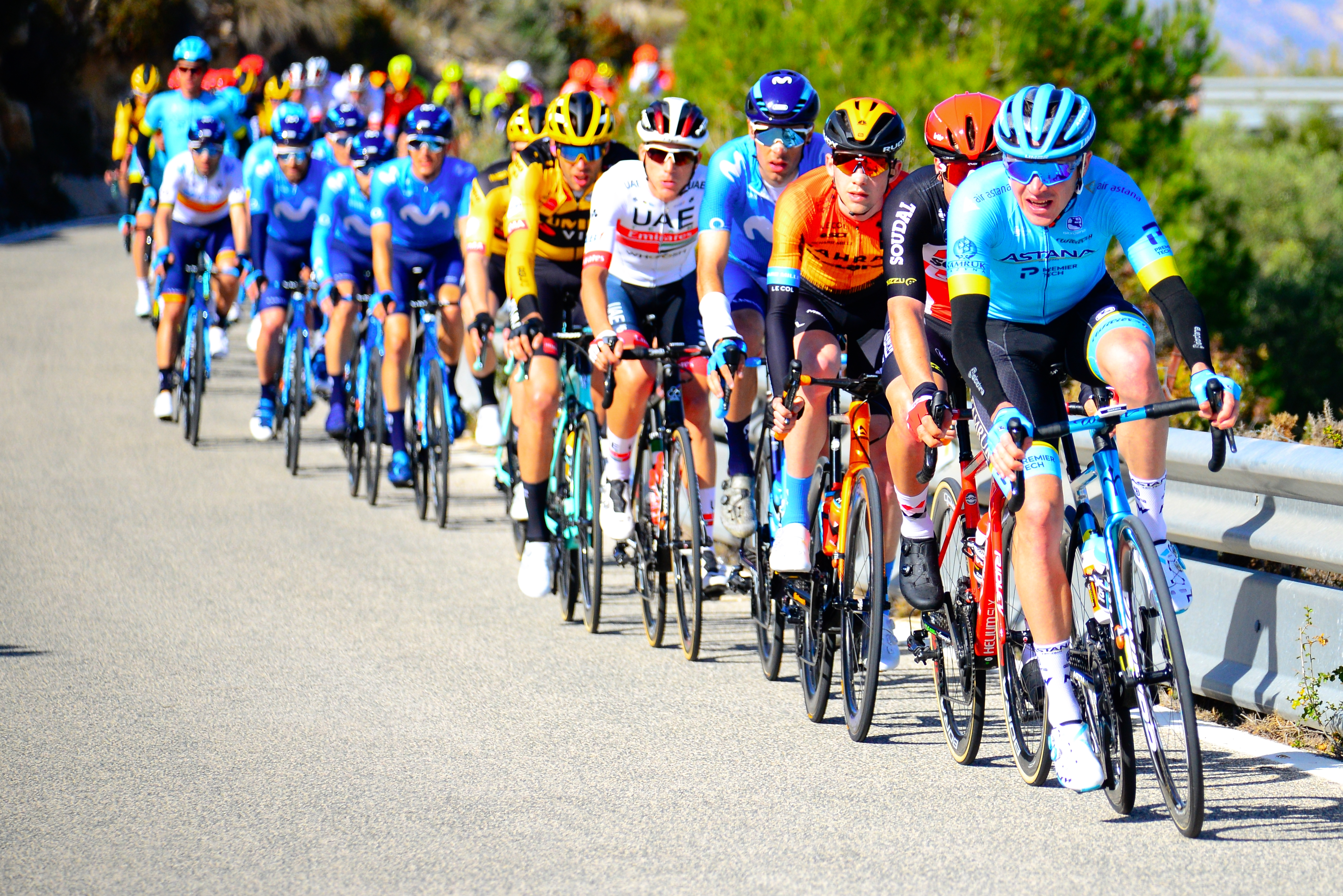
Riders during the 2020 edition

== Results ==
=== Previous winners ===
Year	Country	Rider	Team
1929	Spain	Salvador Cardona	Elvish-Fontan
1930	Spain	Mariano Cañardo	
1931	Spain	Fédérico Ezquerra	
1932	Spain	Ricardo Montero	
1933	Spain	Antonio Escuriet	
1934– 1939	No race		
1940	Spain	Fédérico Ezquerra	
1941	No race		
1942	Spain	Julián Berrendero	
1943	Spain	Antonio Andres Sancho	
1944	Spain	Antonio Martin Eguia	
1945– 1946	No race		
1947	Spain	Joaquin Olmos	
1948	Spain	Emilio Rodríguez	
1949	Spain	Joaquim Filba	
1950– 1953	No race		
1954	Spain	Salvador Botella	
1955	Spain	Francisco Masip	
1956	Spain	René Marigil	
1957	Spain	Bernardo Ruiz	
1958	Belgium	Hilaire Couvreur	
1959	Belgium	Rik Van Looy	
1960	Spain	Fernando Manzaneque	Faema
1961	Spain	Salvador Botella	
1962	Spain	Fernando Manzaneque	Wiel's-Roene Leeuw
1963	Spain	José Martín Colmenarejo	
1964	Spain	Antonio Gómez del Moral	
1965	Spain	José Pérez Francés	Ferrys
1966	Spain	Angelino Soler	
1967	Spain	José Pérez Francés	Kas–Kaskol
1968	Spain	Mariano Díaz	
1969	Belgium	Eddy Merckx	Faemino–Faema
1970	Spain	Ventura Díaz	
1971	Spain	José López Rodríguez	
1972	Spain	Domingo Perurena	Kas
1973	Spain	José Antonio González Linares	Kas–Kaskol
1974	Italy	Marcello Bergamo	
1975	Spain	Vicente López Carril	Kas–Kaskol
1976	Spain	Gonzalo Aja	Teka
1977	Sweden	Bernt Johansson	Fiorella
1978	No race		
1979	Spain	Vicente Belda	Transmallorca
1980	West Germany	Klaus-Peter Thaler	Teka
1981	Spain	Alberto Fernández	Teka
1982	Spain	Pedro Muñoz	
1983	West Germany	Reimund Dietzen	Teka
1984	France	Bruno Cornillet	La Vie Claire
1985	Spain	Jesús Blanco Villar	
1986	France	Bernard Hinault	La Vie Claire
1987	Ireland	Stephen Roche	Carrera Jeans–Vagabond
1988	Switzerland	Erich Mächler	Carrera Jeans–Vagabond
1989	Spain	Pello Ruiz Cabestany	ONCE
1990	Netherlands	Tom Cordes	
1991	Spain	Melcior Mauri	ONCE
1992	Spain	Melcior Mauri	ONCE
1993	Spain	Julián Gorospe	Banesto
1994	Russia	Viatcheslav Ekimov	WordPerfect
1995	Switzerland	Alex Zülle	ONCE
1996	France	Laurent Jalabert	ONCE
1997	Spain	Juan Carlos Domínguez	Kelme
1998	France	Pascal Chanteur	Casino
1999	Kazakhstan	Alexander Vinokourov	Ag2r Prévoyance
2000	Spain	Abraham Olano	ONCE
2001	Switzerland	Fabian Jeker	Milaneza–MSS
2002	Switzerland	Alex Zülle	Team Coast
2003	Italy	Dario Frigo	Fassa Bortolo
2004	Spain	Alejandro Valverde	Kelme–Costa Blanca
2005	Italy	Alessandro Petacchi	Fassa Bortolo
2006	Spain	Antonio Colom	Caisse d'Epargne–Illes Balears
2007	Spain	Alejandro Valverde	Caisse d'Epargne
2008	Spain	Rubén Plaza	S.L. Benfica
2009– 2015	No race		
2016	Netherlands	Wout Poels	Team Sky
2017	Colombia	Nairo Quintana	Movistar Team
2018	Spain	Alejandro Valverde	Movistar Team
2019	Spain	Ion Izagirre	Astana
2020	Slovenia	Tadej Pogačar	UAE Team Emirates
2021	Switzerland	Stefan Küng	Groupama–FDJ
2022	Russia	Aleksandr Vlasov	Bora–Hansgrohe
2023	Portugal	Rui Costa	Intermarché–Circus–Wanty
2024	United States	Brandon McNulty	UAE Team Emirates
2025	Colombia	Santiago Buitrago	Team Bahrain Victorious
2026	Belgium	Remco Evenepoel	Red Bull–Bora–Hansgrohe

=== Multiple winners ===
Number of wins	Rider	Editions
3 wins	(Spain) Alejandro Valverde	2004, 2007, 2018
2 wins	(Spain) Salvador Botella	1954, 1961
2 wins	(Spain) Fédérico Ezquerra	1931, 1940
2 wins	(Spain) José Pérez Francés	1965, 1967
2 wins	(Spain) Fernando Manzaneque	1960, 1962
2 wins	(Spain) Melcior Mauri	1991, 1992
2 wins	(Switzerland) Alex Zülle	1995, 2002

=== Wins per country ===
Wins	Country
47	Spain
5	Switzerland
4	Belgium; France
3	Italy
2	Colombia; Netherlands; Russia; West Germany
1	Ireland; Kazakhstan; Portugal; Slovenia; Sweden; United States

== Classifications ==
As of the 2025 edition, the jerseys worn by the leaders of the individual classifications are:

- Yellow Jersey – worn by the leader of the general classification.
- Orange Jersey – worn by the leader of the points classification.
- Polkadot Jersey – worn by the leader of the climber classification.
- White Jersey – worn by the best rider under-23 years of age on the overall classification.
