= Ernst Wüthrich =

Swiss cyclist

Personal information
- Born: 26 August 1918 Zürich, Switzerland
- Died: 20 August 1972 (aged 53) Thurnen, Switzerland

Cycling career
- Sport: Cycling
- Role: Rider

Ernst Wüthrich (26 August 1918 – 20 August 1972) was a Swiss racing cyclist. He was the Swiss National Road Race champion in 1945.
