= 1941 Vuelta a España =

Race details
- Dates: 12 June – 6 July
- Stages: 21
- Distance: 4,409 km (2,740 mi)
- Winning time: 168h 45' 26"

Results
Jersey awarded to the overall winner	Winner	Julián Berrendero (ESP)
	Second	Fermin Trueba (ESP)
	Third	José Jabardo (ESP)
	Mountains	Fermin Trueba (ESP)

The 3rd Vuelta a España (Tour of Spain), a long-distance bicycle stage race and one of the three grand tours, was held from 12 June to 6 July 1941. It consisted of 21 stages covering a total of 4,409 km (2,740 mi). Delio Rodríguez won 12 of the 21 stages and finished in 4th place overall. Fermin Trueba won three stages and the mountains classification and finished only about one minute behind Julián Berrendero, in a race where the winner's time was nearly 170:00:00.

This was the first time that the Vuelta was won by a Spanish rider. The race was organized by "Educacion y Descanco", an organisation in the Franco dictatorship with the goal to promote arts, culture and sports. Teams from several countries (Belgium, France, Portugal, Switzerland, Germany, Italy and the Netherlands) were invited to send a team of four riders, but the countries involved in World War II were unwilling or unable to do so, and only riders from Spain and neutral Switzerland competed in the race.

Rodriguez rose to fame after this race and later became a significant figure in Spanish cycling history.

== Route ==
List of stages
Stage	Date	Course	Distance	Type	Winner
1	12 June	Madrid to Salamanca	210 km (130 mi)		Julián Berrendero (ESP)
2	13 June	Salamanca to Cáceres	214 km (133 mi)		Antonio Montes (ESP)
3	14 June	Cáceres to Sevilla	270 km (168 mi)		Delio Rodríguez (ESP)
4	16 June	Sevilla to Málaga	212 km (132 mi)		Antonio Escuriet (ESP)
5	17 June	Málaga to Almería	220 km (137 mi)		Delio Rodríguez (ESP)
6	18 June	Almería to Murcia	223 km (139 mi)		Delio Rodríguez (ESP)
7	19 June	Murcia to Valencia	248 km (154 mi)		Antonio Sancho (ESP)
8	21 June	Valencia to Tarragona	279 km (173 mi)		Fermin Trueba (ESP)
9	22 June	Tarragona to Barcelona	112 km (70 mi)		Antonio Martín (ESP)
10	23 June	Barcelona to Zaragoza	294 km (183 mi)		Delio Rodríguez (ESP)
11	24 June	Zaragoza to Logroño	172 km (107 mi)		Delio Rodríguez (ESP)
12	25 June	Logroño to San Sebastián	213 km (132 mi)		Delio Rodríguez (ESP)
13	26 June	San Sebastián to Bilbao	160 km (99 mi)		Fermin Trueba (ESP)
14	28 June	Bilbao to Santander	165 km (103 mi)		Fermin Trueba (ESP)
15	29 June	Santander to Gijón	192 km (119 mi)		Delio Rodríguez (ESP)
16a	30 June	Gijón to Oviedo	53 km (33 mi)	Individual time trial	Delio Rodríguez (ESP)
16b	30 June	Oviedo to Luarca	101 km (63 mi)		Delio Rodríguez (ESP)
17	1 July	Luarca to A Coruña	219 km (136 mi)		Delio Rodríguez (ESP)
18	2 July	A Coruña to Vigo	175 km (109 mi)		Delio Rodríguez (ESP)
19	4 July	Vigo to Verín	178 km (111 mi)		Delio Rodríguez (ESP)
20	5 July	Verín to Valladolid	301 km (187 mi)		Julián Berrendero (ESP)
21	6 July	Valladolid to Madrid	198 km (123 mi)		Vicente Carretero (ESP)

== Results ==
=== Final General Classification ===
Rank	Rider	Team	Time
1	(Spain) Julián Berrendero		168h 45' 26s
2	(Spain) Fermin Trueba		a 1' 07s
3	(Spain) José Jabardo		a 6' 32s
4	(Spain) Delio Rodríguez		a 29' 17s
5	(Spain) Antonio Sancho		a 35' 40s
6	(Spain) Antonio Escuriet		a 35' 57s
7	(Spain) Antonio Martín		a 46' 04s
8	(Spain) Vicente Carretero		a 54' 25s
9	(Spain) José Cano		a 1h 05' 40s
10	(Spain) Manuel Izquierdo		a 1h 24' 13s
11	(Spain) José Botanch		
12	(Spain) Benito Cabestreros		
13	(Spain) Miguel Carrion		
14	(Spain) Cayetano Martin		
15	(Switzerland) Emile Vaucher		
16	(Spain) Martin Santos		
