= Subida al Naranco =

Bicycling competition in Spain

Race details
- Date: Early-May
- Region: Asturias, Spain
- English name: Ascent to Naranco
- Local name: Subida al Naranco (in Spanish)
- Discipline: Road
- Competition: UCI Europe Tour
- Type: Single-day
- Web site: www.lavueltaasturias.com

History
- First edition: 1941
- Editions: 47 (as of 2013)
- First winner: Ulpiano Menéndez (ESP)
- Most wins: Fermín Trueba (ESP) (3 wins)
- Most recent: Igor Antón (ESP)

Subida al Naranco is a professional cycle road race held in Spain in early June each year. The event was first run in 1941 but was not held consistently until 1981. Between 2005 and 2010, the race has been organised as a 1.1 event on the UCI Europe Tour. Since 2011, the race has been held as part of the Vuelta a Asturias stage race. The race ends in a climb of Monte Naranco near Oviedo

== Winners ==
Year	Country	Rider	Team
1941	Spain	Ulpiano Menéndez	
1942	Spain	Fermín Trueba	individual
1943	Spain	Delio Rodríguez	individual
1944	Spain	Dalmacio Langarica	Gallastegui
1945	Spain	Fermín Trueba	individual
1946	Spain	Fermín Trueba	individual
1947	Spain	Jesús Loroño	individual
1948– 1959	No race		
1960	Spain	Antonio Karmany	KAS–Boxing
1961	Spain	Antonio Barrutia	Catigene
1962	Spain	Raúl Rey	Licor 43
1963	Spain	Antonio Karmany	Ferrys
1964	Spain	Federico Bahamontes	Margnat–Paloma
1965	Spain	Joaquín Galera	KAS–Kaskol
1966	Spain	Domingo Perurena	Fagor
1967– 1980	No race		
1981	Spain	Marino Lejarreta	Teka
1982	Spain	Álvaro Pino	Zor–Helios
1983	Spain	Vicente Belda	Kelme
1984	Spain	Vicente Belda	Kelme
1985	Colombia	Alirio Chizabas	Kelme
1986	Spain	Marino Lejarreta	Seat–Orbea
1987	West Germany	Peter Hilse	Teka
1988	Spain	Marino Alonso	Teka
1989	West Germany	Peter Hilse	Teka
1990	Spain	Laudelino Cubino	B.H.–Amaya Seguros
1991	Spain	Juan Carlos Romero	Amaya Seguros
1992	Switzerland	Tony Rominger	CLAS–Cajastur
1993	Spain	Jesús Montoya	Amaya Seguros
1994	Spain	José Manuel Uría	Castellblanch
1995	Spain	Abraham Olano	Mapei–GB
1996	Spain	Francisco Javier Mauleón	Mapei–GB
1997	Spain	Roberto Heras	Kelme–Costa Blanca
1998	Spain	José Luis Rubiera	Kelme–Costa Blanca
1999	Spain	Santiago Blanco	Vitalicio Seguros–Grupo Generali
2000	Spain	José Luis Rubiera	Kelme–Costa Blanca
2001	Denmark	Claus Möller	Milaneza–MSS
2002	Spain	Gonzalo Bayarri	Jazztel–Costa de Almería
2003	Italy	Leonardo Piepoli	iBanesto.com
2004	Spain	Iban Mayo	Euskaltel–Euskadi
2005	Italy	Rinaldo Nocentini	Acqua e Sapone-Adria Mobil
2006	Italy	Fortunato Baliani	Panaria–Navigare
2007	Spain	Koldo Gil	Saunier Duval–Prodir
2008	Spain	Xavier Tondo	LA–MSS
2009	France	Romain Sicard	Orbea
2010	Spain	Santiago Pérez	Centro Ciclismo de Loulé-Louletano
2011	Spain	Constantino Zaballa	Miche–Guerciotti
2012	France	Rémy Di Gregorio	Cofidis
2013	Spain	Javier Moreno	Movistar Team
2015	Spain	Igor Antón	Movistar Team
