= Delio Rodríguez =

Spanish cyclist

Personal information
- Full name: Delio Rodríguez
- Born: 19 April 1916 Ponteareas, Spain
- Died: 14 January 1994 (aged 77) Vigo, Spain

Cycling career
- Sport: Cycling
- Discipline: Road
- Role: Rider
- Rider type: Sprinter

Professional teams
- 1936: Individual
- 1939–1945: Individual
- 1946: Fabas
- 1946: Galindo-Cicles Tabay
- 1947: Individual
- 1948: Paloma
- 1948: Peugeot–Dunlop
- 1949: Fiorelli

Major wins
- Grand Tours Vuelta a España General classification (1945) Points classification (1945) 39 individual stages (1941, 1942, 1945, 1946, 1947) Stage Races Tour of Galicia (1945)

Delio Rodríguez Barros (19 April 1916 – 14 January 1994) was a Spanish professional road racing cyclist and sprinter. Despite winning 12 stages at the 1941 Vuelta and 8 stages at the 1942 Vuelta, Rodríguez failed to make the top five places in the overall standings. Due to World War II, the event was not held in 1943 and 1944, but Rodríguez wanted to win the 1945 event, which he did by going on an early breakaway and winning stage 2 by over a half-hour. In the end, Delio won the event by over 30 minutes, captured six stages and the points classification, too. At the 1947 Vuelta, he finished on the podium in third, and finished with eight stage wins.

Rodríguez is the all-time record holder for stage wins at the Vuelta a España with 39 stage wins conducted over 5 events. Rodríguez had two younger brothers, Emilio and Manolo that were also professional cyclists. Emilio won the overall race while Manolo came second in the 1950 Vuelta a España.

== Major achievements ==
1935
1st GP San Froilan Lugo
1939
2nd Clásica a los Puertos
6th Overall Volta a Catalunya
1940
1st Overall GP Agustin

1st Stages 1, 2, 3 & 4

1st Overall Vuelta a Alava

1st Stages 1, 2 & 3

1st Overall Madrid-Salamanca-Madrid

1st Stages 1 & 2

Volta a Catalunya

1st Stages 1 & 2

1st Stage 1b Trofeo Masferrer
2nd Overall Circuito del Norte

1st Stages 1 & 2

3rd Overall Vuelta a Cantabria

1st Stage 1

3rd Clásica a los Puertos
1941
1st Overall Vuelta a Alava

1st Stages 1 & 2

Volta a Catalunya

1st Stages 4, 5, 6 & 9

Circuito del Norte

1st Stages 1, 3, 6 & 7

Vuelta a Navarra

1st Stages 2 & 4

1st Subida al Naranco
4th Overall Vuelta a España

1st Stages 3, 5, 6, 10, 11, 12, 15, 16a (ITT), 16b, 17, 18 & 19

1942
Volta a Catalunya

1st Stages 7 & 9

3rd Overall Circuito Castilla-Leon-Asturias

1st Stages 1, 3, 5, 6 & 8

7th Overall Vuelta a España

1st Stages 2, 4, 5, 6, 7, 9 (ITT), 12 & 14

1943
Volta a Catalunya

1st Stages 3, 6 & 9

1st Stage 3 GP Ayutamiento de Bilbao
1st Subida al Naranco
3rd Circuito Castilla-Leon-Asturias

1st Stage 2 & 4

1944
Volta a Catalunya

1st Stages 1, 2 & 3

Vuelta a Cantabria

1st Stages 1 & 2

3rd Overall Volta a la Comunitat Valenciana

1st Stages 1, 2, 3, 4 & 6

1945
1st Overall Vuelta a España

1st Points classification
1st Stages 2, 8, 9, 14, 16 & 18

1st Overall Tour of Galicia

1st Stages 2b, 5b & 7

1946
Vuelta a Castilla y León

1st Stages 4, 5, 6 & 7

5th Overall Vuelta a España

1st Stages 13, 14, 15, 17 & 19

1947
Vuelta a Asturias

1st Stages 2 & 10

1st Stage 1 Vuelta a Castilla y León
1st Stage 3 Vuelta a Burgos
2nd Clásica a los Puertos
3rd Overall Vuelta a España

1st Stages 1, 5, 8, 10, 14, 15, 18 & 23

3rd Overall Tour of Galicia

1st Stages 5 & 6

1948
Volta a Portugal

1st Stages 2, 3 & 11

7th Overall Volta a la Comunitat Valenciana

1st Stages 1, 3 & 6
