= Fritz Saladin =

Swiss cyclist

Personal information
- Born: 16 November 1909
- Died: 2 November 1998 (aged 88)

Cycling career
- Sport: Cycling
- Discipline: Road
- Role: Rider

Fritz Saladin (16 November 1909 – 2 November 1998) was a Swiss racing cyclist. He rode in the 1937 Tour de France.
