= Antonio Escuriet =

Spanish road cyclist

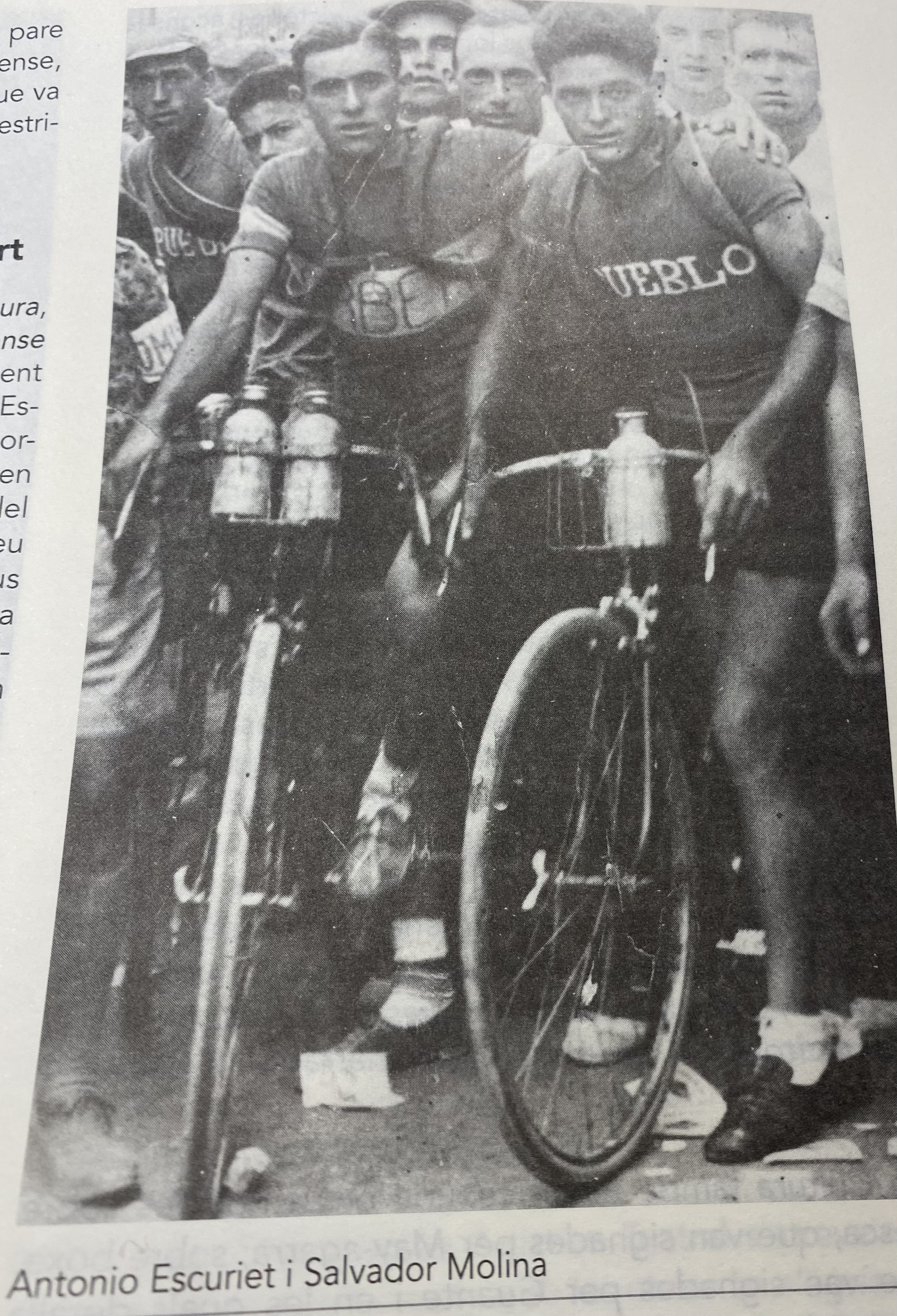
- Escuriet (left) in 1935

Personal information
- Full name: Antonio Escuriet San Pedro
- Born: 7 May 1909 Senyera, Valencia, Spain
- Died: 18 February 1998 (aged 88) Castelló de la Ribera, Spain

Cycling career
- Sport: Cycling
- Discipline: Road
- Role: Rider

Professional teams
- 1931: Styl
- 1932–1936: Orbea
- 1936: FC Bonavista
- 1936–1937: PC Escuriet
- 1941–1942: FC Barcelona

Antonio Escuriet (7 May 1909 – 18 February 1998) was a Spanish road cyclist. Professional from 1930 to 1942, he notably won the 1933 Vuelta a Levante and two stages of the Vuelta a España.

== Major results ==
1930
5th Overall Vuelta a Levante
1931
2nd Road race, National Road Championships
9th Overall Volta a Catalunya
1932
3rd Overall Vuelta a Levante
1933
1st Overall Vuelta a Levante

1st Stage 2

1st Overall Barcelona–Madrid

1st Stage 1

1st Stage 4 Vuelta a Pontevedra
3rd Trofeo Masferrer
1934
8th Overall Volta a Catalunya

1st Stage 10

8th Clásica a los Puertos
1935
1st Stage 2 Vuelta a España
1st Vuelta a Alava
2nd Circuito de Getxo
3rd GP Pascuas
3rd Prueba Villafranca de Ordizia
4th Overall Tour of Galicia

1st Stages 6 & 8

1936
1st GP Pascuas
3rd Clásica a los Puertos
5th Overall Vuelta a España
8th Overall Volta a Catalunya
1939
3rd Overall Vuelta a Aragón
4th Overall Volta a Catalunya

1st Stage 5

1940
3rd Overall Vuelta a Levante
1941
6th Overall Vuelta a España

1st Stage 4
