= Vuelta a España =

Annual bicycle race primarily held in Spain

Race details
- Date: August–September (since 1995)
- Region: Spain
- English name: Tour of Spain
- Local name: Vuelta Ciclista a España (in Spanish)
- Nickname: La Vuelta
- Discipline: Road
- Competition: UCI World Tour
- Type: Grand Tour
- Organiser: Unipublic; Amaury Sport Organisation
- Race director: Javier Guillén
- Web site: lavuelta.es

History
- First edition: 29 April 1935; 91 years ago
- Editions: 81 (as of 2026)
- First winner: Gustaaf Deloor (BEL)
- Most wins: Roberto Heras (ESP); Primož Roglič (SLO); (4 wins)
- Most recent: Enric Mas (ESP)

The Vuelta a España (pronounced [ˈbwelta a esˈpaɲa]; lit. 'Tour of Spain') is an annual multi-stage road cycling race primarily held in Spain. Inspired by the success of the Tour de France and the Giro d'Italia, the race was first organised in 1935. The race was prevented from being run by the Spanish Civil War and World War II in the early years of its existence; however, the race has been held annually since 1955. As the Vuelta gained prestige and popularity the race was lengthened and its reach began to extend all around the globe. Since 1979, the event has been staged and managed by Unipublic, until in 2014, when the Amaury Sport Organisation acquired control. Since then, they have been working together. The peloton expanded from a primarily Spanish participation to include riders from all over the world. The Vuelta is a UCI World Tour event, which means that the teams that compete in the race are mostly UCI WorldTeams, with the exception of the wild card teams that the organizers can invite.

Along with the Tour de France and Giro d'Italia, the Vuelta is one of cycling's prestigious Grand Tours. First held in 1935 and annually since 1955, the Vuelta runs for three weeks in a changing route across Spain. While the route changes each year, the format of the race stays the same, with the appearance of at least two time trials, the passage through the mountain chain of the Pyrenees or the Cantabrian Mountains, and the finish in the Spanish capital Madrid. The modern editions of the Vuelta a España consist of 21 day-long stages over a 23-day period that includes 2 rest days.

It was originally held in the spring, usually late April, with a few editions held in June in the 1940s. In 1995, however, the race moved to September to avoid direct competition with the Giro d'Italia, held in May. As a result, the Vuelta is now often seen as an important preparation for the World Championships, which moved to October the same year. However, starting in 2023 this is no longer the case as every fourth year the Worlds will now be held in August. A Vuelta was also organized in August and September 1950. The race now usually starts in late August, but the 2020 race started in October due to a delay caused by the COVID-19 pandemic.

All of the stages are timed to the finish; after finishing, the riders' times are compounded with their previous stage times. The rider with the lowest aggregate time is the leader of the race and gets to don the red jersey. While the general classification garners the most attention, there are, or have been, other contests held within the Vuelta: the points classification for the sprinters, the mountains classification for the climbers, the combination classification for the all-round riders, and the team classification for the competing teams.

La Vuelta Femenina, a women's edition of the race, was first held in 2023, part of the UCI Women's World Tour. This follows smaller races staged in conjunction with the Vuelta between 2015 and 2022.

== History ==
=== Origins ===
The first races in Spain were run at the national level and were promoted by the bicycle manufacturers from Eibar. Consequently, the tour was Eibar – Madrid – Eibar, and called the Grand Prix of the Republic.

=== 1935–1960 ===
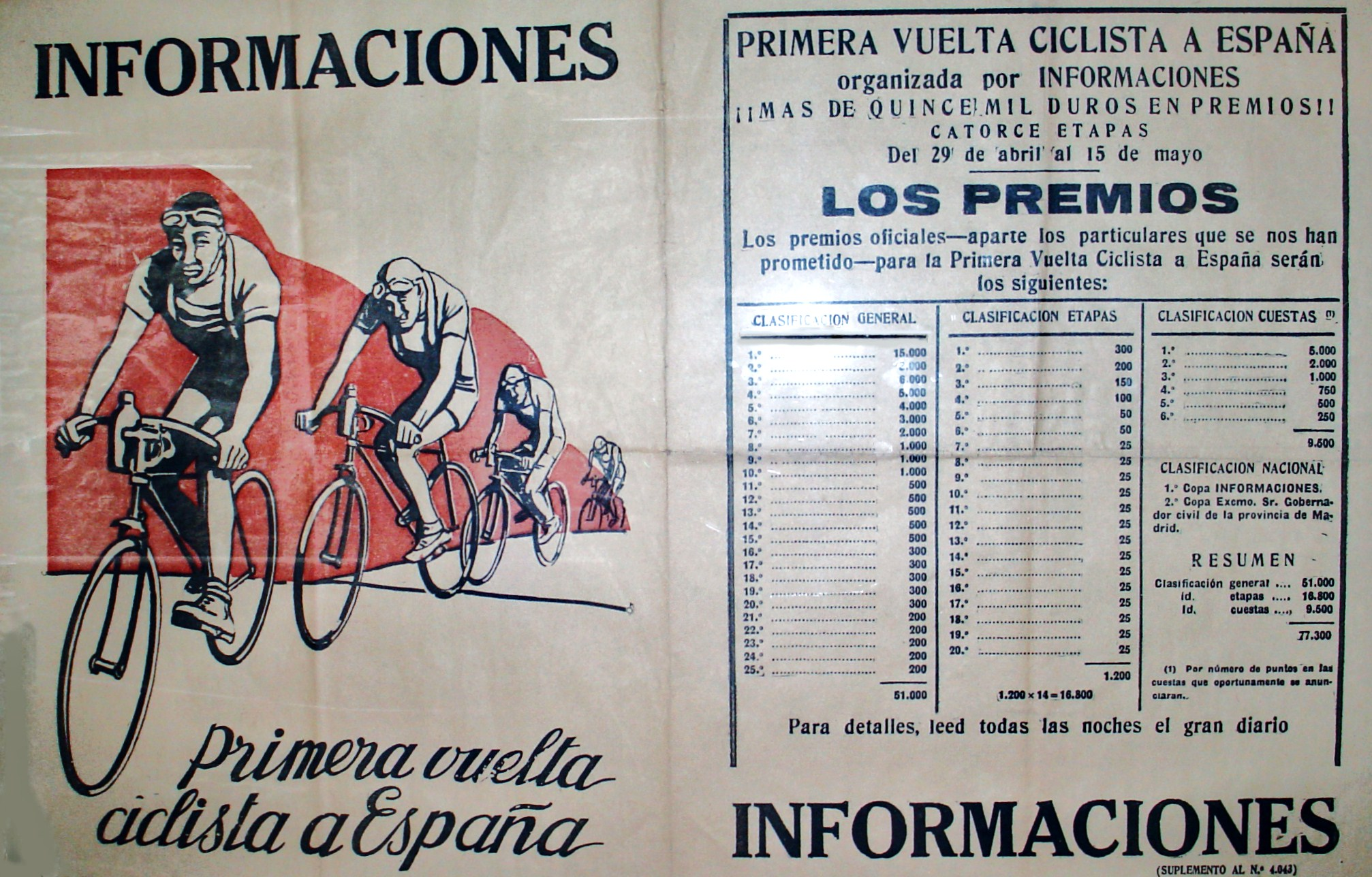
The daily Informaciones with information about the Vuelta a España first edition

In early 1935, former cyclist Clemente López Doriga, in collaboration with Juan Pujol, director of the daily newspaper Informaciones, organized the Vuelta a España, The inaugural event saw 50 entrants face a 3,411 km (2,119 mi) course over only 14 stages, averaging over 240 km (149 mi) per stage. It was inspired by the success of the Tours in France and Italy, and the boost they brought to the circulations of their sponsoring newspapers (L'Auto and La Gazzetta dello Sport respectively); Pujol of instigated the race to increase Informaciones's circulation.

The first stage took the riders from Madrid to Valladolid. That year saw the first great duel in the history of the Vuelta, between Belgium's Gustaaf Deloor, who ultimately won, and Mariano Cañardo, Spanish runner-up.

The second edition of the Vuelta, finally held despite the delicate political situation, was also marked by the Deloor repeat, who this time held the lead from the first day to the last. The 1936 edition remains the longest winning finish time of the Vuelta in 150:07:54, the race consisted of 22 stages with a total length of 4,407 km. Gustaaf finished first and his older brother Alfons finished second overall.

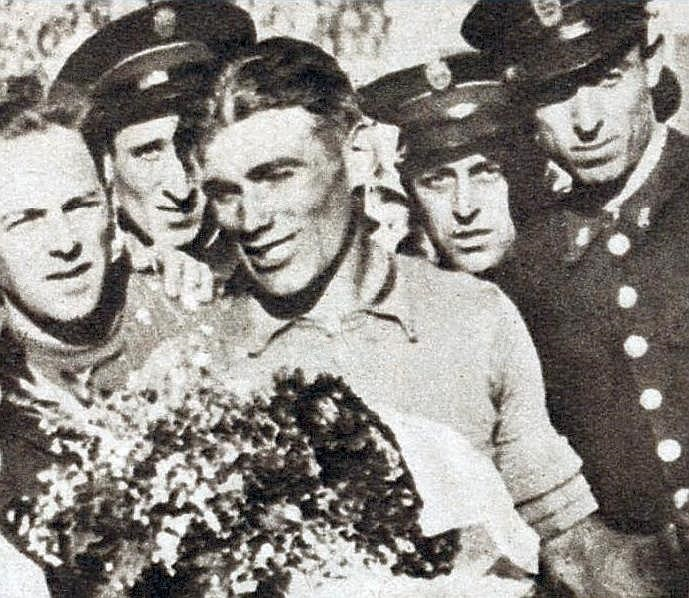
Gustaaf Deloor, winner of the first two editions of the Vuelta in 1935 and 1936

After the first two editions, the Spanish race suffered a hiatus because of the Spanish Civil War.

In 1941, the Vuelta resumed competition with an almost entirely Spanish peloton and very little foreign representation. That year the first time trial was held in the Vuelta. Julián Berrendero was proclaimed the winner, and he recaptured the title the next year. In addition, Berrendero was King of the Mountains for three consecutive years.

With World War II and the precarious economic situation, there was another break in the running of the Vuelta a España.

In 1945, the Journal took over organization of the race and competition resumed, although again with few foreign competitors in the peloton. On this occasion, Delio Rodríguez took the final victory. That year also introduced the points classification, but this was not stable until 1955. Four editions were run until 1950.

Subsequently, there was no Vuelta until 1955, when it was organized by the Basque newspaper El Correo Español-El Pueblo Vasco. Since then, the Vuelta a España has been run annually. At this time, the Vuelta is run routinely in August and September, but it was previously run in April and May. Another difference was the number of participants. Previously, there were very few, but the number doubled, with more internationally recognized competitors.

=== 1960–1970 ===
The prestige of the Vuelta increased, with more stars from the international cycling scene. During the late 1950s came the first successes in the overall standings of Italian and French riders. In the 1960s, they would also be joined by German and Dutch riders. In 1963, Jacques Anquetil won the general classification, establishing himself as the first rider to win all three Grand Tours. Five years later, in 1968, Felice Gimondi would do the same.

Antonio Karmany dominated the mountain classification for three consecutive years, then was replaced by Julio Jiménez, who won it for another three years.

In 1965, Rik Van Looy became the first rider to repeat victory in the points classification. Jan Janssen in 1968 and 1974 Domingo Perurena would do the same, winning this classification twice.

During the mid-1960s the organizer of the Vuelta, El Correo Español-El Pueblo Vasco, went through some financial problems that endangered the running of the competition. However, during that time all editions ended normally. In 1968, the Vuelta was hit by a terrorist attack and other events, having to cancel the 15th stage. There were no fatalities.

=== 1970–1980 ===
The 1970s began with the triumph of Luis Ocaña, who was already established in the international squad as one of the greats of cycling.

José Manuel Fuente, with victories in 1972 and 1974, became the third rider to win two Tours of Spain. A few years later, Bernard Hinault repeated the feat, which was also achieved by Pedro Delgado during the 1980s.

In 1973, Eddy Merckx won the Vuelta by a landslide, winning six stages and all individual classifications with the exception of the mountains competition: he finished second.

Freddy Maertens in 1977 echoed a similar domination to that demonstrated by Merckx a few years earlier, by winning thirteen stages and all individual classifications except the mountain.

In the mid-1970s, Andrés Oliva managed to earn the King of the Mountains title in three editions of the Vuelta.

Frenchman Bernard Hinault emerged in 1978 as an international cycling star. The same year, Hinault won his first Tour de France. The last stage of that edition also had to be suspended because of riots and barricades that prevented the normal course of it.

When 1979 El Correo Español-El Pueblo Vasco left as a sponsor of the race, the Vuelta was once again endangered. However, the company Unipublic took charge of the competition. This, coupled with increased advertising and the beginning of the broadcasts via television, further grew revenue and interest in the Vuelta.

=== 1980–1990 ===
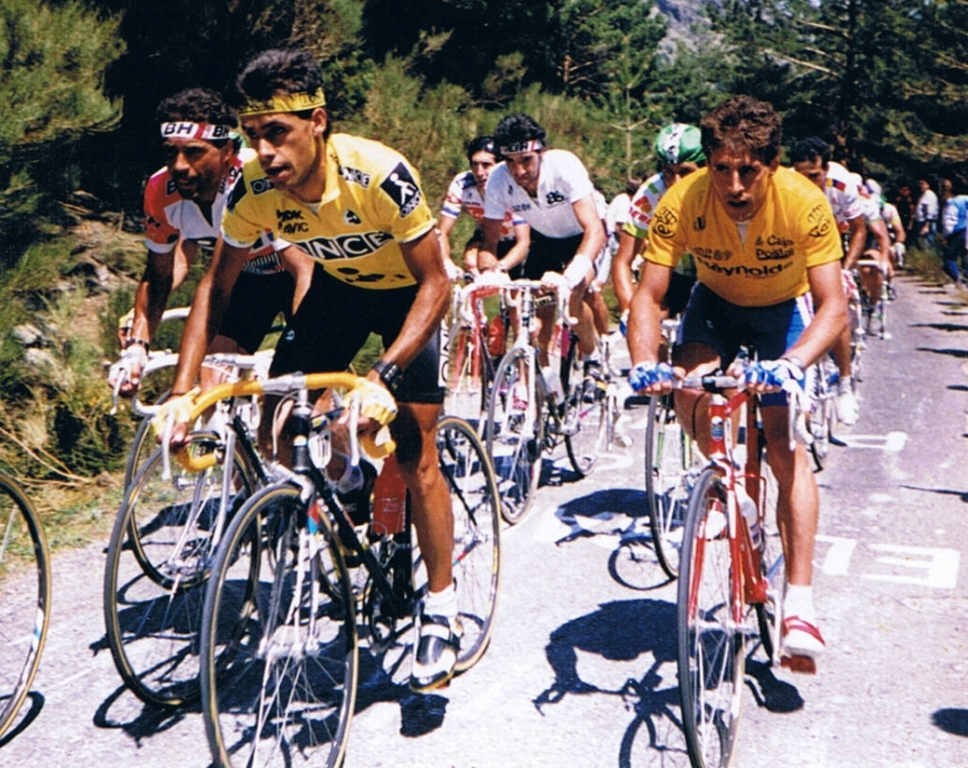
Pedro Delgado (right) during the 1989 Vuelta a Espana

In the early 1980s, two names stood out in the secondary classifications: José Luis Laguía, who won the mountain classification five times, and Sean Kelly, who won four times in the points classification.

In 1982 came the first case of disqualification of the winner for doping. Two days after the end of the competition, Ángel Arroyo and a few other riders were disqualified, and Arroyo lost his victory to Marino Lejarreta. Arroyo appealed for a B test of his sample, which again tested positive. Arroyo was given a ten-minute penalty, and ultimately ended up placing thirteenth in the general classification.

Next year's edition was the first appearance of the Lagos de Covadonga as a final stage, an ascent that would become, over the years, the most iconic climb of the Vuelta a España. In 1984 it played the issue in a race that ended with the smallest difference between the first and second place. Éric Caritoux, a complete unknown until then, managed to win the Vuelta with only six seconds ahead of Alberto Fernández in second place.

The end of the 1980s was marked by the rise of Colombian cycling, which presented a strong challenge particularly in the mountain stages. Names such as Lucho Herrera (winner in 1987) or Fabio Parra (2nd in 1989) appeared in the last editions of the decade. One of the rulers at that time was also Pedro Delgado, with two victories (1985 and 1989), a second place, and two third-place finishes. In the 1988 edition, the start took place in the Canary Islands with 3 stages. The race was won by Irishman Sean Kelly, his only overall victory in a Grand Tour.

=== 1990–2000 ===
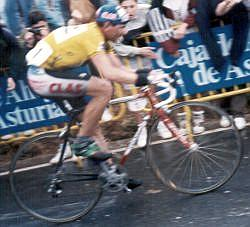
Tony Rominger, winner of three consecutive Vueltas between 1992 and 1994

The first half of the 1990s was marked by the dominance of Swiss rider Tony Rominger, the first rider to win three times and win the race consecutively between 1992 and 1994.

The fiftieth edition of the Vuelta, which was held in 1995, coincided with the change of dates. The Vuelta a España came to be held in September, and near the end of the season as the last of the three Grand Tours of the year. This was done to attract more high-profile riders, who before had preferred to ride the Giro d'Italia or the Tour de France, which both took place very closely to the Vuelta's timeslot. That year Laurent Jalabert won all classifications, the second time this happened in the Vuelta (Rominger had done so in 1993). The Frenchman was also a four-time winner of the points classification, matching the previous record set by Sean Kelly in the 1980s.

In 1997, the tour started for the first time in a foreign country. They began in Lisbon, on the occasion of Expo '98.

The ascent of the Alto de L'Angliru was part of a stage for the first time in 1999, with the victory of José María Jiménez, four-time winner of the mountains classification. The reputation of the climb grew rapidly because of its demanding nature.

=== 2000–2010 ===
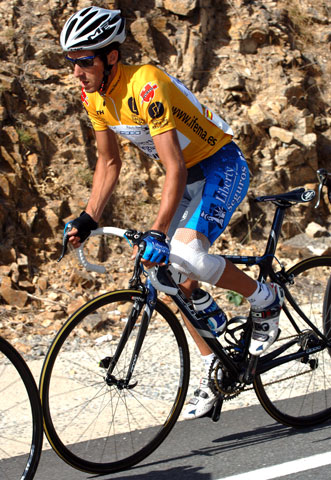
Roberto Heras wearing the leader's jersey at the 2005 Vuelta a Espana

The first editions of the 2000s were marked by the dominance of Roberto Heras, who achieved victory on three occasions, and in 2005 did it for the fourth time. However, as happened with Ángel Arroyo in 1982, Heras was disqualified days after the end of the competition after testing positive in a doping test, this time for use of EPO. This positive development was later ratified by the counter-analysis and Heras was stripped of his title, benefiting the Russian cyclist Denis Menchov until 2012, when the Spanish Courts overturned the positive test and re-awarded the win to Heras. In 2006 Alexander Vinokourov won after a struggle with the then leader of the UCI Pro Tour, Alejandro Valverde. In the 2007 edition Denis Menchov again clinched the overall victory by more than three minutes over the Spanish cyclists Carlos Sastre and Samuel Sánchez. In June 2008, French company Amaury Sport Organisation (ASO), who organize the Tour de France, announced it had bought 49% of Unipublic.

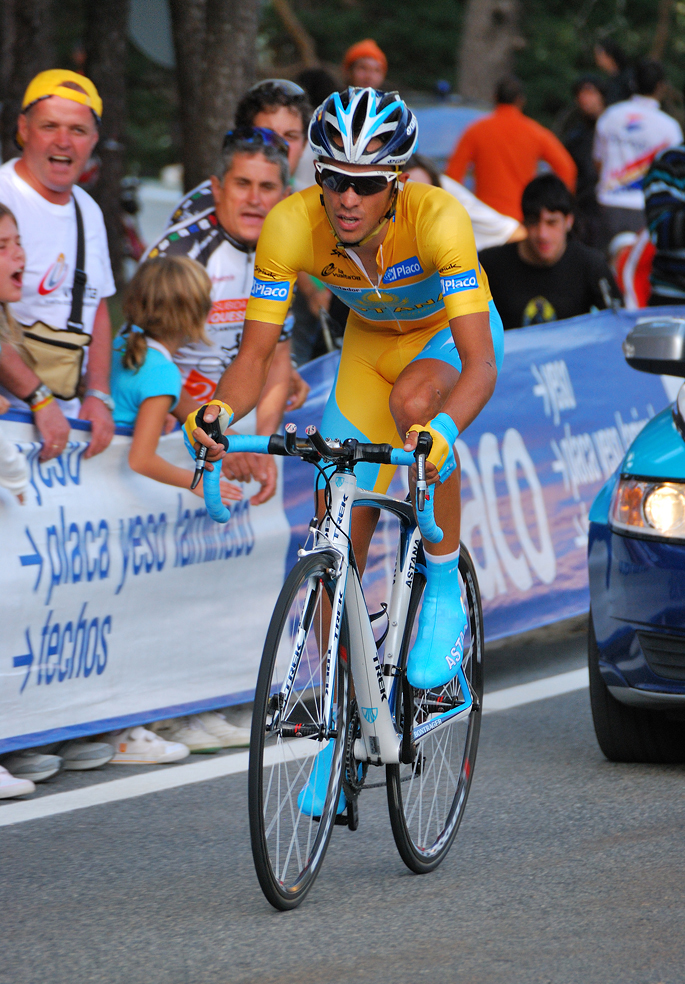
Alberto Contador at the 2008 Vuelta a España

In 2008, the winner was the Spaniard Alberto Contador, who also won that year's Giro d'Italia, and became the first Spaniard to win all three Grand Tours. In 2009, the Vuelta began in Drenthe, Netherlands, continuing through Belgium and Germany. The final winner was Alejandro Valverde, who adopted a conservative stance without winning any stage and sprinting in the final meters to achieve bonuses. His main rivals were Samuel Sánchez (second place), Cadel Evans (third), Ivan Basso, Robert Gesink and Ezequiel Mosquera. All of them suffered critical falls or punctures such as Evans in Monachil.

=== 2010–2018 ===
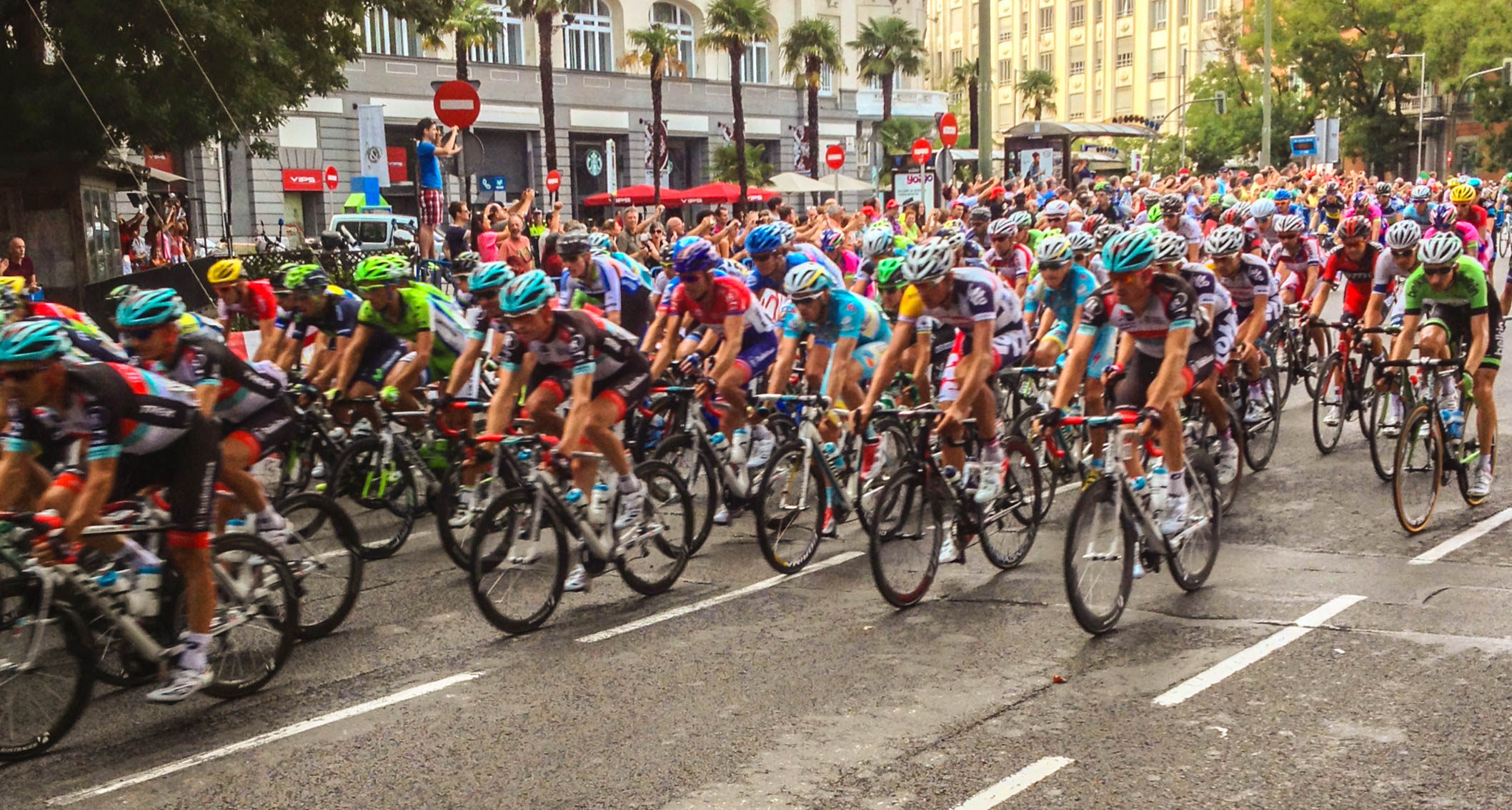
The 21st and final stage of the 2013 Vuelta a España on Paseo del Prado in Madrid

Vincenzo Nibali won the 2010 edition without winning a stage, thanks to consistent high placings on summit stage finishes and the race's two time trials. He had inherited the race lead after Igor Antón was forced to abandon after crashing on stage 14. Though Nibali lost the race lead to Joaquim Rodríguez, he later regained it on the final time trial. This marked his first grand tour victory.

The 2011 Vuelta was the 66th edition of the race and was the first Vuelta in 33 years that visited the Basque Country. The 33-year absence from the region was due to fear of political protests. The victory was originally awarded to Juan José Cobo who had a race-winning margin of just 13 seconds over Briton Chris Froome. Neither rider had been marked as a pre-race favourite, and both had gone to the Vuelta as domestiques for their team leaders: Cobo for Denis Menchov, and Froome for Bradley Wiggins; their team leaders originally finished 5th and 3rd respectively. The race was the first time that two Britons had stood on the podium of a Grand Tour, and Froome's second-place finish equalled the highest placing by a British rider in a Grand tour, Pippa York finishing second in the race in 1985 and 1986, until Wiggins won the Tour de France the following year. In 2019 Cobo's win was annulled for doping violations, and the race awarded to Froome.

In 2012, the race was won for the second time by Alberto Contador of Saxo Bank–Tinkoff Bank, taking his first overall victory since returning from a doping suspension. Contador, who won the seventeenth stage of the race after a solo attack, won the general classification by 1 minute and 16 seconds over runner-up Alejandro Valverde of the Movistar Team team. Completing an all-Spanish podium, Joaquim Rodríguez finished the race third overall, 21 seconds behind Valverde and 1 minute and 37 seconds behind Contador, having led the race for 13 days between the fourth and sixteenth stages. Rodríguez also achieved three stage victories.

The 2013 Vuelta a España saw another shock result when the 41-year-old American Chris Horner defeated Vincenzo Nibali, Alejandro Valverde and Joaquim Rodríguez to become the first North American to win the Vuelta and the oldest rider to win a grand tour. In addition Horner clinched the race's combination classification. The race was also notable for Tony Martin's all-day solo break on stage 6, when he broke away at the start and led for nearly the entire stage before being caught 20 metres from the finish line, placing seventh behind stage winner Michael Mørkøv.

In March 2014, ASO acquired full control of Unipublic, with both working together with the running of the race.

The 2014 race featured a field described as the strongest in a grand tour in recent memory, as a range of accomplished riders entered the race after suffering injuries or health problems earlier in the season. Contador claimed his third Vuelta, Contador went into the race uncertain of his form after crashing out of the Tour de France on the 10th stage, breaking his tibia. However, Contador found his form in the race earlier than expected, taking the red jersey on the 10th stage individual time trial and taking two key mountain stage wins on his way to victory. He won the race by 1 minute and 10 seconds over runner-up, Chris Froome. Like Contador, Froome also went into the race uncertain of his form after he crashed three times in two days during the Tour, leading to his withdrawal. However, Froome came to life during the third week, finishing second in three key mountain stages and taking time to move into second place overall. Alejandro Valverde completed the podium, finishing 40 seconds behind Froome and 1 minute and 50 seconds behind Contador.

The 2015 edition saw another strong field contest the race, including the top four finishers at the 2015 Tour de France (Froome, Valverde, Nibali and Nairo Quintana) and two of the podium finishers from the 2015 Giro d'Italia in the form of Nibali's teammates Fabio Aru and Mikel Landa. The early leaders of the race were Esteban Chaves and Tom Dumoulin, who exchanged the leader's red jersey several times during the first ten days of racing, with both riders winning summit finishes in the first week. With the withdrawals of Chris Froome and the disqualification of Vincenzo Nibali, Nibali's team mate Fabio Aru took over the race lead following the mountainous Stage 11, which took place entirely within Andorra. He kept his lead for five stages as the race entered the mountains of northern Spain, but lost it to Rodríguez on Stage 16. Dumoulin took the lead back on Stage 17 – the race's only individual time trial – with Aru three seconds behind in second place. Aru attacked throughout the final stages and, on the penultimate day, finally dropped Dumoulin, who fell to sixth place overall. Aru therefore took the first Grand Tour victory of his career.

Nairo Quintana won the 2016 edition ahead of Froome, with the Colombian Esteban Chaves finishing third. Quintana had gained over 2 1/2 minutes over Froome on Stage 15 when he and Contador attacked together from 10 kilometres (6.2 miles) into the stage and blew the race apart, isolating Froome from his Team Sky teammates. Whilst Froome fought back and managed to gain back nearly all he had lost in a dominant victory on the stage 19 individual time trial to Calp, Quintana was able to follow several attacks by Froome on Stage 20, the final mountain stage to Alto de Aitana, to secure overall victory by 1 minute and 23 seconds over Froome. By doing so, Quintana became the second Colombian after Luis Herrera in 1987 to win the Vuelta.

The 2017 edition started in Nîmes, France. It was the first time the race has started in France and only the third time it has started outside Spain, after 1997 (Portugal) and 2009 (Netherlands). The general classification was won by 2017 Tour de France champion Chris Froome from Team Sky, ahead of Vincenzo Nibali of Bahrain–Merida. Froome became the third rider to win the Tour-Vuelta double after Jacques Anquetil (1963) and Bernard Hinault (1978), and the first to do so since the Vuelta was moved to its current calendar position. Froome also won the points and combination classifications, becoming the first rider to win three jerseys in a single Vuelta since Denis Menchov in 2007.

In 2018, it was another British rider who won the race, in Simon Yates, riding for the Mitchelton–Scott. Aged 26 this was Yates' first grand tour win, and meant that for the first time all three grand tours in a year had been won by three different riders from the same country, after Froome won the 2018 Giro d'Italia and Geraint Thomas won the 2018 Tour de France.

=== 2019–present ===
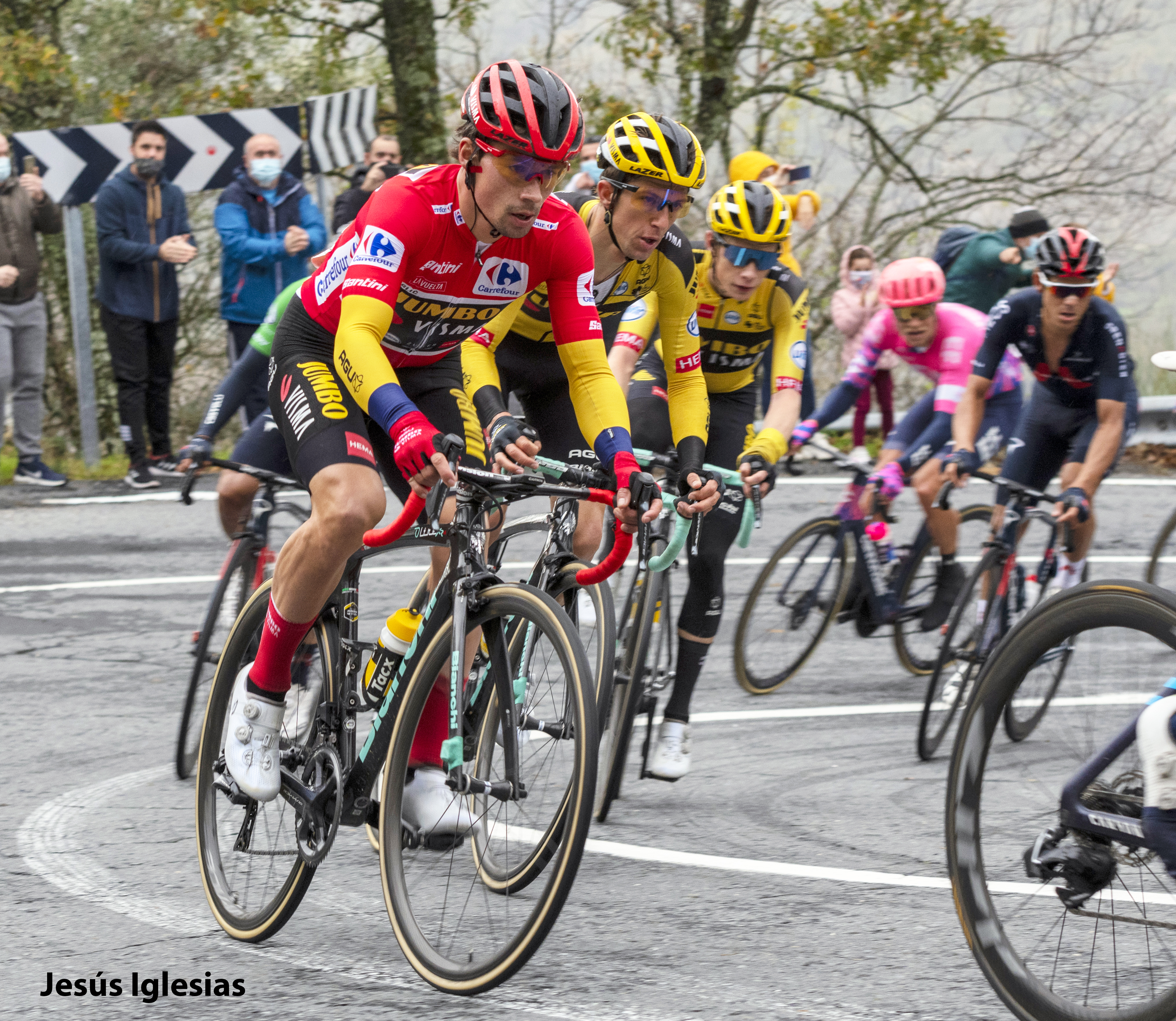
Primož Roglič wearing the Red Jersey at the 2020 Vuelta a España

The 2019 Vuelta was won by Primož Roglič, who became the first Slovenian cyclist to win a Grand Tour.

The 2020 Vuelta a España was originally scheduled to be held from 14 August to 6 September 2020. In April 2020, the 2020 Tour de France was rescheduled to run between the 29 August and 20 September, having been postponed in view of the COVID-19 pandemic. On 15 April, UCI announced that both the Giro d'Italia and the Vuelta would take place in autumn after the 2020 UCI Road World Championships. On 5 May, UCI announced that the postponed Giro and the Vuelta would run between 3 and 25 October and between 20 October and 8 November, respectively. For the first time since 1985, the race was not 21 stages long; instead, it was held in a reduced format over 18 stages. Roglic defended his title in a hard-fought race with Richard Carapaz which was among the closest Vueltas in history with the winning margin being only 24 seconds. The 2020 Vuelta had the smallest margin of victory since the 1984 Vuelta a España, which was the smallest margin of victory of any grand tour in cycling history.

In 2021, Roglič returned in the 2021 Vuelta a España and this time dominated the field to take his third consecutive victory in the race. He became only the third rider to win the race in three successive years. He won by 4 minutes and 42 seconds, the largest margin of victory since Alex Zülle won by 5 minutes and 7 seconds in 1997.

The 2022 Vuelta a España was won by the UCI World Road Race champion, Belgian Remco Evenepoel after starting in Utrecht, Netherlands. The 2023 Vuelta a España was won by Sepp Kuss, who took the red jersey on stage 6 after winning from a breakaway. Kuss held on to win the general classification by 17 seconds over his teammate Jonas Vingegaard. Primoz Roglič, also a member of Visma–Lease a Bike, finished third, making the race the first time a single team swept the podium of a grand tour. The 2024 Vuelta a España was won by Primož Roglič, who tied Roberto Heras's record for the most general classification wins.

The 2025 Vuelta a España was won by Jonas Vingegaard for the first time. Vingegaard built an advantage early on in the race with two stage wins, before defending his lead despite illness in the second week. A win on the penultimate stage sealed his victory. Several stages of the race were affected by pro-Palestinian protests regarding the Gaza war, and the inclusion of Israel–Premier Tech team, with multiple stages finishing prematurely, two without a stage winner. The final stage to Madrid, in particular, was cancelled upon reaching the circuit after several protesters invaded the road and knocked down the barriers.

== Classifications ==
The overall leader at present wears a red jersey— the Spanish counterpart to the yellow jersey of the Tour de France. Other jerseys honor the best climber (King of the Mountains, awarded a blue-on-white polka dot jersey) and leader of the points competition (for many years awarded a blue with yellow fish jersey sponsored by Spain's fishing and marine industry, but more recently given a green jersey).

Since the 1950 Vuelta, the leaders of the other race classifications have been permitted to wear identifying jerseys (previously, there was an official mountain classification, but no identifying jersey). For a long time, a blue jersey identified the leader of the points classification, green the leader of the mountain classification, and white the leader of the combination classification (until it ended in 2018). Recently, these other classifications have used jerseys more like those used at the Tour de France, with the points leader using a green jersey, the King of the Mountains using a polka dot jersey (albeit blue-on-white rather than red-on-white as at the Tour) and the best young rider a white jersey.

Usually, other cycling jerseys are awarded, such as for points leaders in the "Metas Volantes" (intermediate sprints) and for the combination category (a point system that honors the best rider with the combined total points in the best overall, points and mountains classifications).

=== General Classification ===
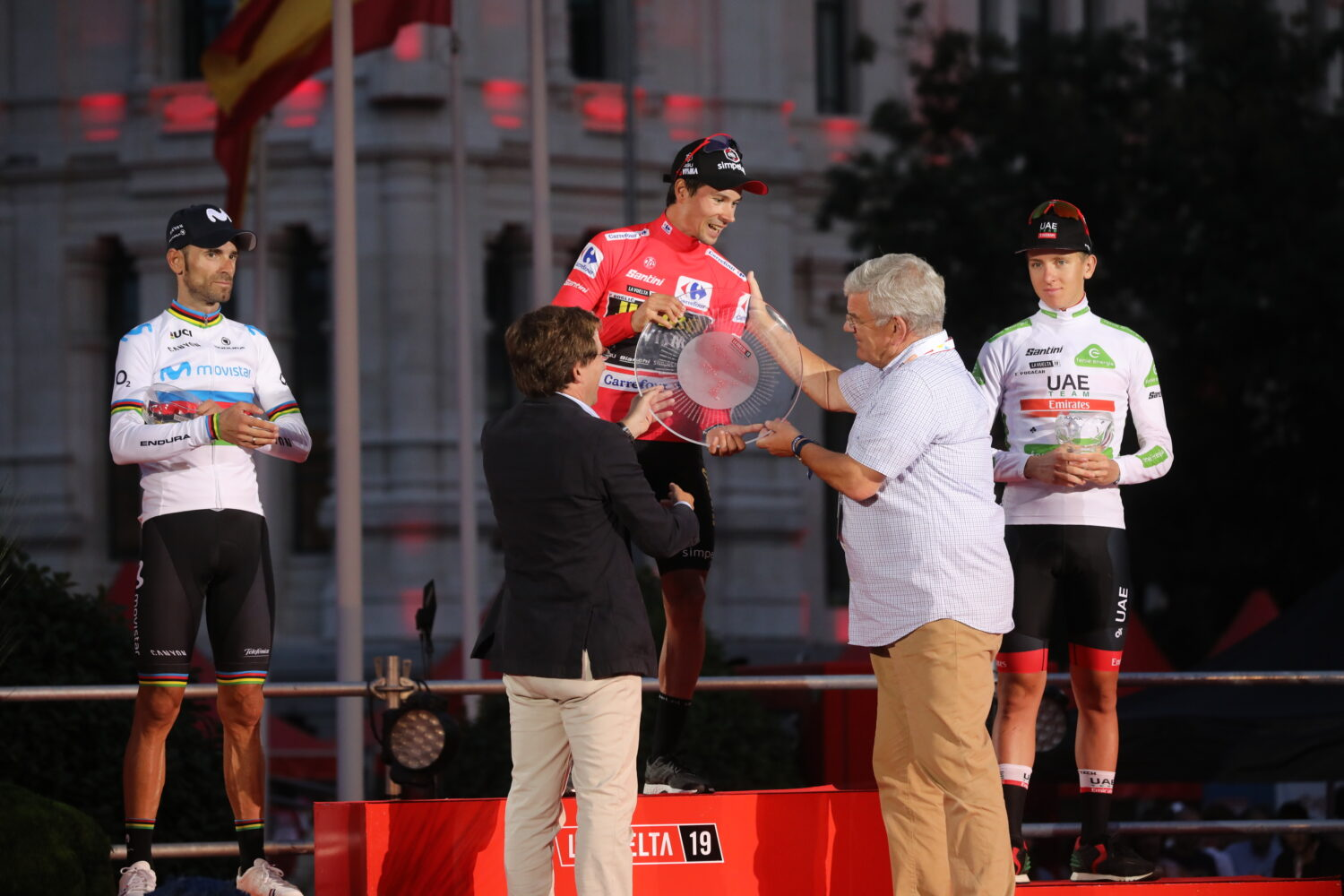
Primoz Roglic, winner of the 2019 Vuelta a Espana

The leader of the general classification is permitted to wear a jersey of a particular colour signifying the lead (maillot rojo or red jersey), as in the Tour de France (maillot jaune or yellow jersey) and the Giro d'Italia (maglia rosa or pink jersey).

The colour of the leader's jersey of the Vuelta a España has changed several times since the original tour. The organizers who revived the Vuelta following its multiple suspensions since 1936 usually changed the color of the jersey. The leader's jersey began as orange in 1935, became white in 1941, then back to orange in 1942. It was white with a horizontal red stripe from 1945 to 1950. In 1955, when El Correo resurrected the Vuelta, yellow became the colour of the leader's jersey, the same color as in the Tour de France (known as the "Maillot amarillo"). Except for the 1977 Vuelta, when the jersey was orange, a yellow jersey was worn until 1998, when the color was deepened to a gold hue ("Jersey de Oro").

However, for the 2010 edition, the colour of the leader's jersey was changed to red.

The record for most wins stands at four, and is jointly held by Roberto Heras of Spain, and Primož Roglič of Slovenia. Spaniards have dominated, winning 32 of the 79 editions of the Vuelta. France, Belgium, Switzerland, Italy, Germany, the Netherlands, Colombia, Ireland, Russia, Kazakhstan, the United States and Great Britain have also had first-place finishers.

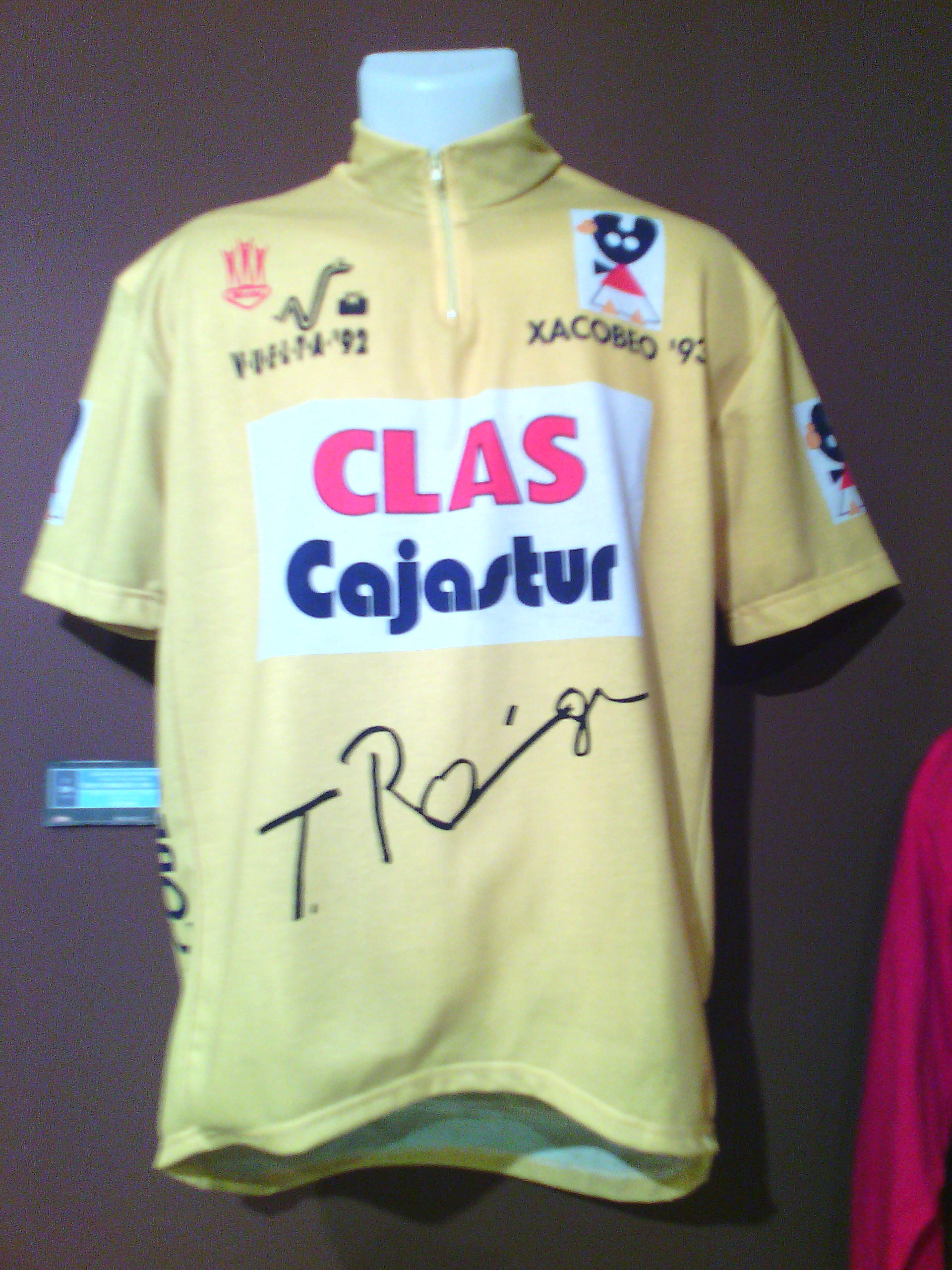
Leader's jersey worn by three-time winner Tony Rominger at the 1992 Vuelta a España

Most wins in the Vuelta a España general classification
Cyclist	Total	Years
Roberto Heras (ESP)	4	2000, 2003, 2004, 2005
Primož Roglič (SLO)	4	2019, 2020, 2021, 2024
Tony Rominger (SUI)	3	1992, 1993, 1994
Alberto Contador (ESP)	3	2008, 2012, 2014
(seven riders tied)	2	

=== Mountains Classification ===
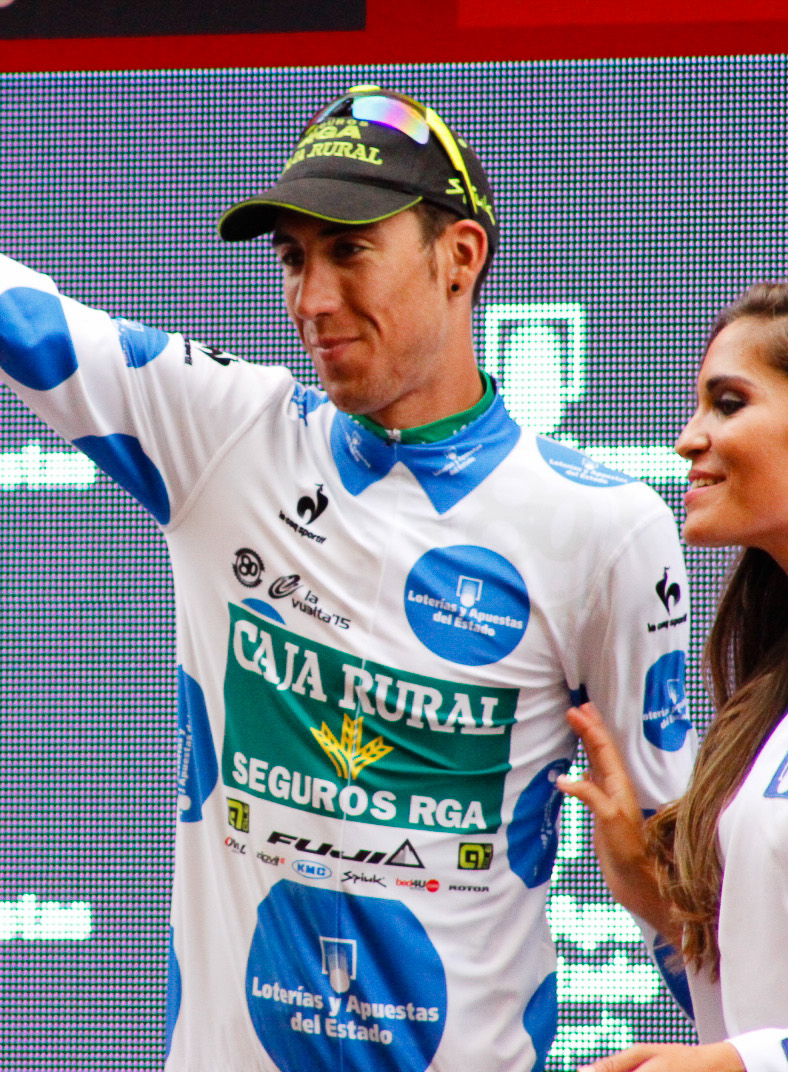
Omar Fraile, winner of the mountains classification at the 2015 Vuelta a España

The mountains classification in the Vuelta a España is a secondary classification in the Vuelta a España. For this classification, points are given to the cyclists who cross the mountain peaks first. The classification was established in 1935, when it was won by Italian Edoardo Molinar, and until 2005 the leader in the mountain classification wore a green jersey. In 2006, it became an orange jersey, and in 2010 it became white with blue dots.

Spaniard José Luis Laguía has won this classification a record five times, including three consecutive. Other cyclists who have won this ranking for three consecutive times were Antonio Karmany, Julio Jiménez, José María Jiménez, all Spaniards. Overall, the Spaniards have dominated this classification by 47 out of 68 times. In 2010, David Moncoutié considered retirement, but remained a professional cyclist to try to win his third consecutive mountains classification. In 2011, he became the first rider ever to win this award in four consecutive years.

As of 2010, the leader of the mountains classification is awarded a white jersey with blue dots. The mountains jersey is third in the rankings of jerseys, behind the jersey for the general classification and points classification in the Vuelta a España but before the combination classification; this means that if a cyclists leads both the general classification and the mountains classification, he wears the jersey for the general classification, and the mountains jersey is passed on to the second cyclist in that ranking.

The organisation of the Vuelta designates which climbs are given points, and in which category they fall. As of 2010, there are 5 categories: most points are scored on the Top Alberto Fernández, the highest point of the Vuelta.

Points distribution in the Vuelta a España
Class	1	2	3	4	5	6
Top Alberto Fernández	20	15	10	6	4	2
High climb finish	15	10	6	4	2	
First category	10	6	4	2	1	
Second category	5	3	1			
Third category	3	2	1			

If two or more cyclists have the same number of points, the cyclist who was first on the 'Top Alberto Fernandez' gets the higher ranking. If that does not solve the problem, the cyclists with the most high climb finishes wins gets the higher ranking. If that does not solve it, the cyclists with the most first category wins, and so on. If after the third category there is still a tie, the order in the general classification is used.

=== Points Classification ===
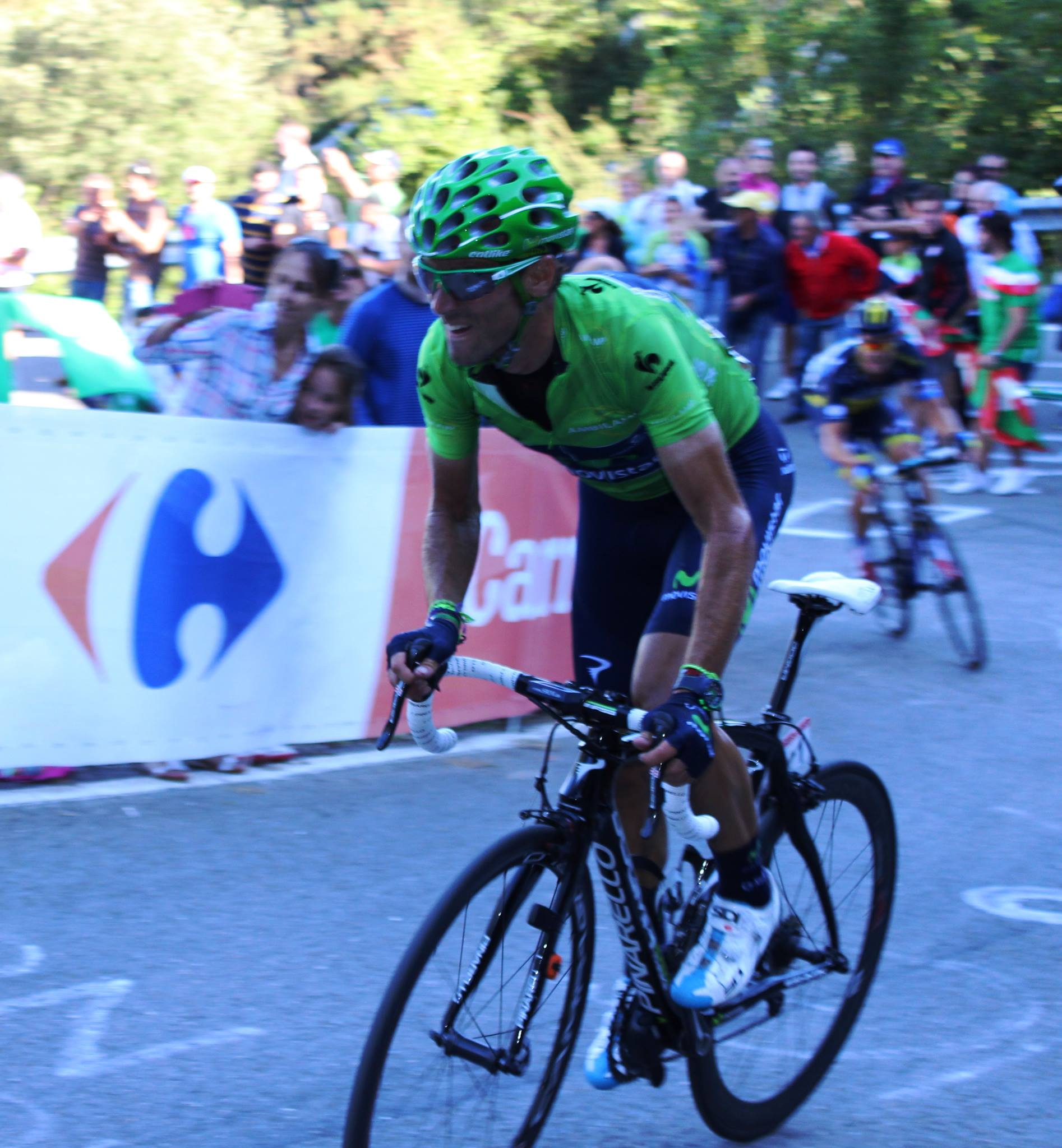
Alejandro Valverde, wearing the green jersey of points classification leader, at the 2013 Vuelta a España

The points classification in the Vuelta a España is a secondary classification, in which the cyclists are ranked in a points classification, based on the finish of each rider every stage.

For the first time, a points classification was calculated in 1945, sponsored by Pirelli. It was calculated as follows:

- The winner of a stage received 100 points, the second 99, and so on. If cyclists arrived in a group that was given the same time, they all received the same number of points.
- The first five cyclists in a stage received 12 points for every minute that they arrived ahead of the number six of the stage.
- For every point scored for the mountains classification, two points were given for this points classification.
- On intermediate sprints, points could be won: 8 for the winner, 6 for the second, 4 and 2 for the next.

Although the sponsor said that the classification was a great success, it did not return the next edition.

The next time that a points classification was calculated, was in 1955. Then it used the method of adding the stage ranks, in the same way as the points classification in the Tour de France did then; just like in the Tour de France, the leader of the points classification (with the fewest points) wore a green jersey. In 1963, the points system changed such that from now on points were given to the first cyclists to reach the finish, and the cyclist with the most points was the leader.

Seán Kelly, Laurent Jalabert and Alejandro Valverde, with 4 titles each, share the record of victories.

=== Young rider classification ===
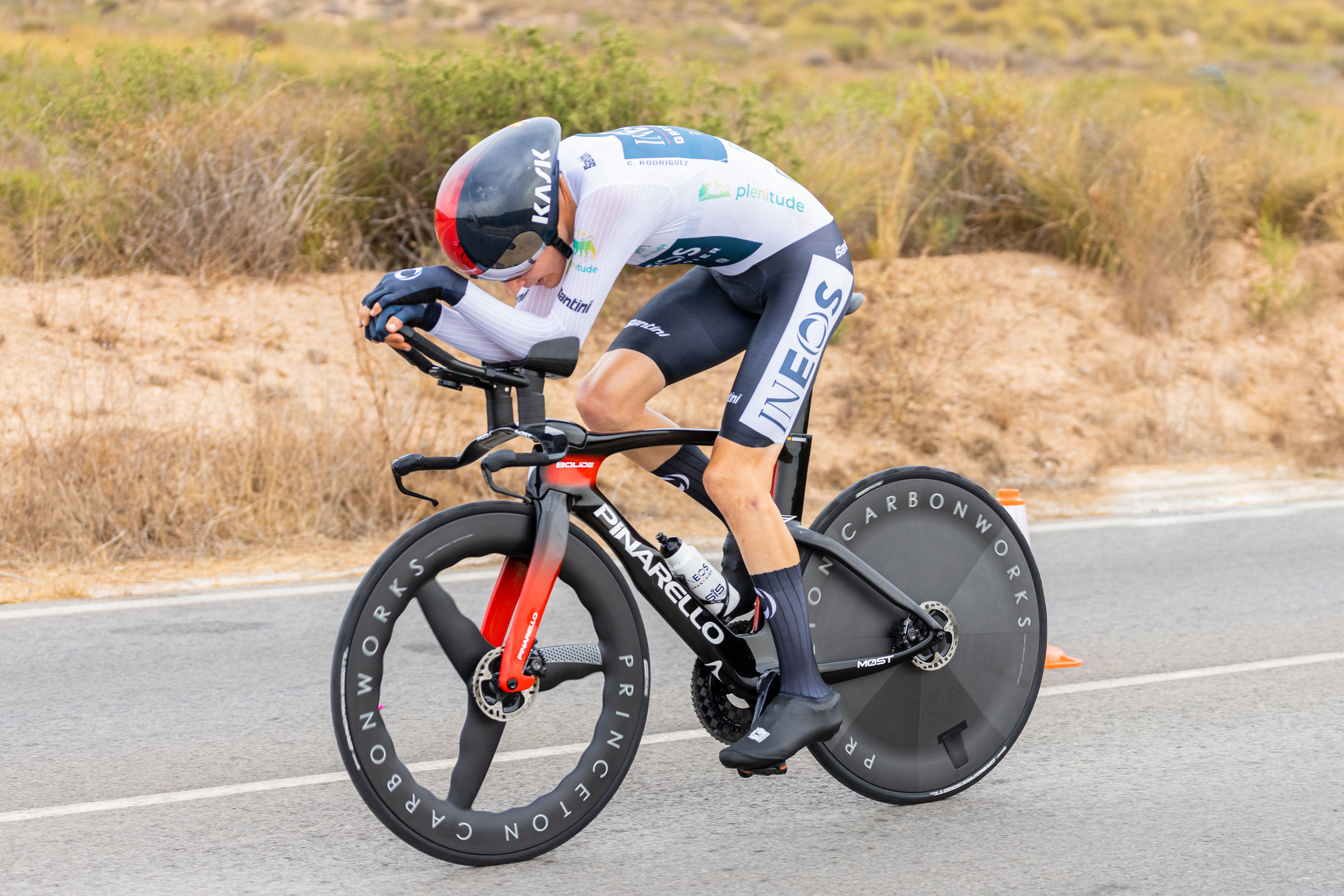
Carlos Rodríguez wearing the white jersey at the 2022 Vuelta a España

The young rider classification is awarded based on the young rider with the lowest cumulative time (the same methodology as the general classification). The jersey is also awarded alongside the points and mountains classifications.

In the 2017 and the 2018 editions, the winner only wore a red number bib as the white jersey was awarded to the winner of the Combination classification.

=== Team classification ===
The team classification has been awarded since the race's inception in 1935.

=== Defunct classifications ===
The combination classification was calculated by adding the numeral ranks of each cyclist in the general, points, and mountains classifications (a rider must have had a score in all classifications possible to qualify for the combination classification), with the lowest cumulative total signifying the leader of this competition.

From 2006 to 2018, the leader of the classification wore a white jersey; in 2005 it was a golden-green jersey.

The award strongly favoured top riders in the competition. Since its re-introduction in 2002, it was only won by someone other than the race's overall winner four times: in 2002, 2003, 2012, and 2015. On all four of those occasions, the winning cyclist was placed either second or third in the overall classification.

The combination classification was discontinued in 2019. Now, the white jersey is worn by the best young rider.

The Vuelta was the last major race to feature a combination classification.

== The race route and stages ==
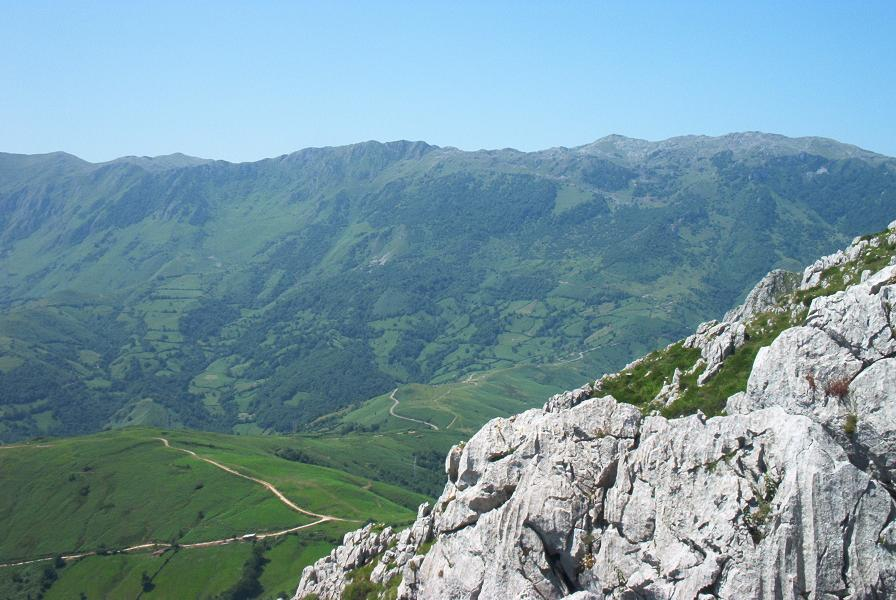
The Alto de l'Angliru

The course typically includes up to three time trials, and a number of mountain stages. Since 1994, and often before (such as in the inaugural edition), the Vuelta finished in the Spanish capital, Madrid, although Bilbao (in the 1950s) and San Sebastián (in the 1970s) were long both recurring finish cities. Behind Madrid, three cities share second place for the most Vuelta departures: Gijón, Bilbao, and one time finish city Jerez de la Frontera. In 1997, the Vuelta started abroad for the first time, in Lisbon, Portugal. The first ever Vuelta to start outside the Iberian Peninsula took place in 2009, when the Dutch city of Assen hosted the prologue of the 64th Vuelta. The 2025 Vuelta started in Turin, Italy on 23 August, 2025.

Lagos de Covadonga is one of the most important climbs in the modern history of the Vuelta. The road that leads to the lakes starts at Covadonga and is 12.6 km long at an average gradient of 7.3% (height gain: 1,056 m). The most demanding section is La Huesera, 7 km from the top of the climb, with an average gradient of 15% during 800 m. It was featured for the first time in 1983 with the victory of Marino Lejarreta, who was in a fierce battle with Bernard Hinault for overall victory. This was the same Vuelta that saw Hinault, Greg LeMond and Laurent Fignon all riding on the same team. Stage 7 of the 2023 La Vuelta Femenina ended at Lagos de Covadonga, with Dutch cyclist Demi Vollering placing first.

In 1999, for the first time, the course crossed the Alto de L'Angliru in Asturias, which climbs 1,573 m (5,160 ft) over 12.9 km (8.0 mi) with grades as steep as 23.6% (at Cueña-les-Cabres), making it one of the steepest climbs in Europe. Credit for the discovery of this climb and its addition to the Vuelta goes to Miguel Prieto.

=== Start and finish of the Vuelta ===
Starts

Starts of the Vuelta a España
#	City	Hosted	First start	Last start
1	Madrid	10	1935	1959
2	Bilbao	4	1955	1958
2	Gijón	4	1960	2003
2	Jerez de la Frontera	4	1979	2014
5	Benidorm	3	1964	2011
5	Málaga	3	2000	2018
7	Barcelona	2	1962	2023
7	Vigo	2	1965	2007
7	Murcia	2	1966	1999
7	Almería	2	1971	1974
7	Fuengirola	2	1972	1975
7	Valladolid	2	1985	1994
7	A Coruña	2	1989	1993
7	Valencia	2	1996	2002
7	Granada	2	2005	2008
7	(Portugal) Lisbon	2	1997	2024
7	Santiago de Compostela	2	1982	2027
17	San Sebastián	1	1961	
17	Zaragoza	1	1968	
17	Badajoz	1	1969	
17	Cádiz	1	1970	
17	Calp	1	1973	
17	Estepona	1	1976	
17	Dehesa de Campoamor	1	1977	
17	La Manga	1	1980	
17	Santander	1	1981	
17	Almussafes	1	1983	
17	Palma	1	1986	
17	Santa Cruz de Tenerife	1	1988	
17	Benicàssim	1	1990	
17	Mérida	1	1991	
17	Zaragoza	1	1995	
17	Córdoba	1	1998	
17	Salamanca	1	2001	
17	León	1	2004	
17	(Netherlands) Assen	1	2009	
17	Seville	1	2010	
17	Pamplona	1	2012	
17	Vilanova de Arousa	1	2013	
17	Marbella	1	2015	
17	Cenlle	1	2016	
17	(France) Nîmes	1	2017	
17	Torrevieja	1	2019	
17	Irun	1	2020	
17	Burgos	1	2021	
17	(Netherlands) Utrecht	1	2022	
17	(Italy) Turin	1	2025	
17	(Monaco) Mónaco	1	2026	
17	(Italy) Sardinia	1	2028	

Finishes

Finishes of the Vuelta a España
#	City	Hosted	First finish	Last finish
1	Madrid	55	1935	2027
2	Bilbao	13	1955	1970
3	San Sebastián	6	1972	1978
4	Santiago de Compostela	3	1993	2021
1	Miranda de Ebro	1	1977	
1	Palazuelos de Eresma	1	1983	
1	Salamanca	1	1985	
1	Bola del Mundo (Note: The last stage ending in Madrid was suspended due to pro-Palestinian protests)	1	2025	
1	Granada	1	2026	

==== Starts abroad ====
Most stages are in mainland Spain, although since the mid-1990s it has become common to visit nearby countries: Portugal, Andorra and France. It has also taken place in the Netherlands, Germany and Belgium. Six editions of the Vuelta so far have started outside Spain, with a 7th scheduled in 2026. A start abroad in Utrecht, Netherlands was planned for the 2020 edition, however this was cancelled in light of the COVID-19 pandemic in Spain and a revised route starting in Irun was used in 2020. Instead, the 2022 Vuelta a España started in Utrecht.

Foreign starts of the Vuelta a España
Year	Country	City	Ref(s).
1997	Portugal	Lisbon	
2009	Netherlands	Assen	
2017	France	Nîmes	
2022	Netherlands	Utrecht	
2024	Portugal	Lisbon	
2025	Italy	Turin	
2026	Monaco		
2028	Italy	Sardinia	

== Stage wins ==
=== Stage wins per rider ===
17 riders have won 10 or more individual stages.

Active riders are in bold.

Stage wins per rider in the Vuelta a España
Rank	Name	Country	Wins
1	Delio Rodríguez	ESP	39
2	Alessandro Petacchi	ITA	20
3	Rik Van Looy	BEL	18
3	Laurent Jalabert	FRA	18
5	Sean Kelly	IRL	16
6	**Primož Roglič**	SLO	15
7	Gerben Karstens	NED	14
8	Freddy Maertens	BEL	13
8	Tony Rominger	SUI	13
10	Domingo Perurena	ESP	12
10	Marcel Wüst	GER	12
10	Alejandro Valverde	ESP	12
13	Julián Berrendero	ESP	11
13	Augustin Tamames	ESP	11
15	Eddy Planckaert	BEL	10
15	Roberto Heras	ESP	10
15	**John Degenkolb**	GER	10

== Records ==
- Most Vuelta a España victories: Roberto Heras, Primož Roglič, 4
- Most Vuelta a España consecutive victories: Tony Rominger, Roberto Heras, Primož Roglič, 3
- Most Vuelta a España Stage wins: Delio Rodríguez, 39
- Most stage wins in one edition: Freddy Maertens in 1977, 13
- Most individual time trial wins: Abraham Olano, Alex Zülle, and Tony Rominger, 6
- Most number of victories by country: Spain, 32
- Most days as leader: Alex Zülle, 48
- Most mountains classification victories: José Luis Laguía, 5
- Most points classification victories: Sean Kelly, Laurent Jalabert and Alejandro Valverde, 4
- Most number of intermediate sprints classification victories: Miguel Ángel Iglesias, 5
- Largest margin of victory: Delio Rodríguez over Julián Berrendero in 1945, 30 minutes and 8 seconds
- Smallest margin of victory: Éric Caritoux over Alberto Fernández in 1984, 6 seconds
- Most participations: Íñigo Cuesta, 17 (1994–2010).
- Most consecutive participations: Íñigo Cuesta, 17 (1994–2010).
- Most Vueltas finished: Federico Echave, 14 (1982–1995), and Íñigo Cuesta, 14 (1994, 1996–99, 2001–03 and 2005–10)
- Most consecutive Vueltas finished: Federico Echave, 14 (1982–1995).
- Fewest participants: 1941, 32
- Greatest number of participants: 2002, 207
- Fastest average speed: 2001, 42.534 km/h
- Slowest average speed: 1941, 26.262 km/h
- Longest edition: 1941, 4,442 km
- Shortest edition: 1963, 2,419 km
- Youngest general classification winner: Angelino Soler in 1961, age 21 years, 167 days
- Oldest general classification winner: Chris Horner in 2013, age 41 years, 327 days

== Related events ==
Between 2015 and 2022, a women's race (Challenge by La Vuelta) was held in conjunction with the final day(s) of the Vuelta as part of the UCI Women's World Tour. Initially a one day race, it became a stage race from 2018 onwards, with the 2022 edition featuring 5 stages. The race was criticised for its lack of difficulty, with winner Annemiek van Vleuten stating "if you look at the [2022] course you can conclude that the Vuelta (sic) is not yet ready to call itself a grand tour".

From 2023, La Vuelta Femenina – a 7-day stage race in the UCI Women's World Tour – was held in May.

== Official song ==
Since 1978, every edition of La Vuelta has had an official song. These are the official songs of each edition of La Vuelta:

Year	Song title	Artist
2026	"Despierto Amándote"	Miranda!
2025	"Te estaba esperando"	Antonio Orozco
2024	"Cuando acabe el verano"	Miss Caffeina
2023	"Corazón sin salida"	Estopa
2022	"C’Mon C’Mon"	Lorena Medina, The Inner Kids & Sophie Francis
2021	"1932"	La M.O.D.A.
2020	"Como un atleta"	Carlos Baute
2019	"Otro intento más"	Arkano
2018	"La vida son sólo dos días"	Nuria Fergó
2017	"Bailarina"	Maldita Nerea
2016	"El ganador"	Marta Sánchez
2015	"Amanecer"	Edurne
2014	"La Pepa"	Sara Baras
2013	"Mambo"	Carlos Núñez
2012	"Día cero"	La Oreja de Van Gogh
2011	"Como yo"	La Fe de Manuela
2010	"Otra oportunidad"	Preciados
2009	"Merezco"	Zahara
2008	"Pretendo hablarte"	Beatriz Luengo
2007	"Como la vida"	Hanna
2006	"En qué estrella estará"	Nena Daconte
2005	"Mi primera vez"	Xucro
2004	"Con la luna llena"	Melendi
2003	"Tirador"	Hevia
2002	"Que el ritmo no pare"	Patricia Manterola
2001	"Corazón congelado"	Pastora Soler
2000	"El cielo no entiende"	OBK
1999	"El garrotín"	Hevia
1998	"Up & Down"	Vengaboys
1997	"Kandela"	Manuel Malou
1996	"Morena"	Ana Obregón y Ramón García
1995	"Jaguarundi"	Víctor Coyote
1994	"Earth"	Uakti
1993	"Two pa ka"	Azul y Negro
1992	"No smoking"	Havana
1991	"Dámelo ya"	La Unión
1990	"The perils of tourisme"	Man Jumping
1989	"Más y más"	La Unión
1988	"Pedaleando"	Serafín Zubiri
1987	"Tic Tac Tic Tac"	Magic Mix
1986	"Conga"	Miami Sound Machine
1985	"Baila"	Iván
1984	"Pánico en el Edén"	Tino Casal
1983	"No tengo tiempo"	Azul y Negro
1982	"Me estoy volviendo loco"	Azul y Negro
1981	"Stars on 45"	Stars on 45
1980	"Funky Town"	Lipps Inc.
1979	"Goodnight Tonight"	Paul McCartney and Wings
1978	"Singin’ in the rain"	Sheyla & B. Devotion
