= Fédérico Ezquerra =

Spanish cyclist (1909–1986)

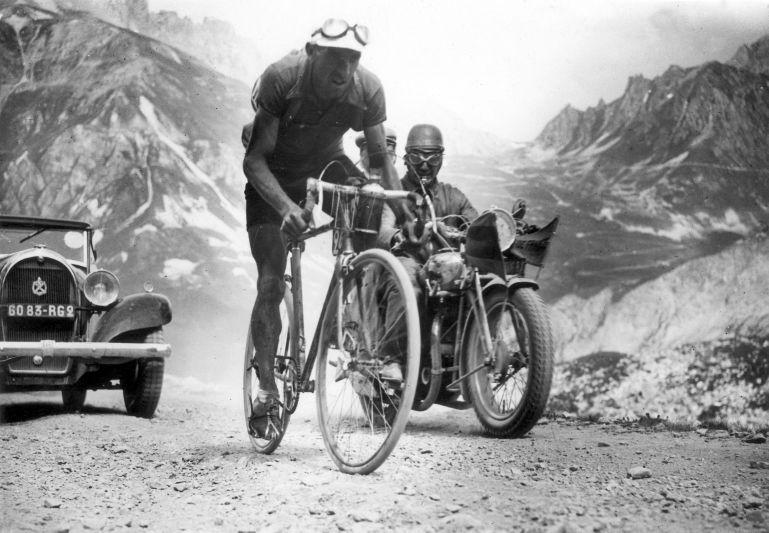

Personal information
- Full name: Fédérico Ezquerra
- Born: 10 March 1909 Gordexola, Spain
- Died: 30 January 1986 (aged 76) Güeñes, Spain

Cycling career
- Sport: Cycling
- Discipline: Road
- Role: Rider

Major wins
- (Spain) national road race champion (1940)

Fédérico Ezquerra (10 March 1909 — 30 January 1986) was a Spanish professional road bicycle racer. Born at Gordexola, he was the brother of cyclist Arturo Ezquerra. He died at Güeñes in 1986.

== Major results ==
1928
Colindres
Sestao
Zierbana
1929
Arrigorriaga
1930
Circuito Luarca
Vuelta a Piqueras
Zesboa
1931
Circuito Luarca
Circuito Sodupe
Legazpia
Valladolid
Vuelta a Levante
Volta a la Comunitat Valenciana
1932
Burgos
Circuito Montserty
Circuito Sodupe
Vuelta a Alava
1933
GP de la Bicicleta Eibarresa
GP de Vizcaya
GP Mondragon
(Spain) national track stayers championship
Subida a Santo Domingo
Vuelta a Galega (incl. 2 stages)
Vuelta Pontevedra (incl. 1 stage)
1934
GP de Bilbao
Torrelavega
Vuelta a la Valle de Leniz
1935
Circuito de Getxo
GP Alonsotegui
GP Aracena
GP de Bilbao
GP de Vizcaya
Trofeo Falas
1936
Beasain
Lazkao
Tour de France:

Winner stage 11

1938
Eibar - San Sebastian - Eibar (incl. stage 1)
GP Alava
GP de Bilbao
GP San Juan
Prueba Villafranca de Ordizia
1939
Cinturion de Bilbao
Vuelta a Alava
1940
Circuito de Getxo
GP Pascuas
Prueba Villafranca de Ordizia
Sondika
Vuelta a Estella
(Spain) Spanish National Road Race Championship
Circuito del Norte
Volta a la Comunitat Valenciana
1941
Vuelta a España:

Winner stage 13

1942
Ampuero
Circuito de Getxo
Circuito del Norte (incl. 2 stages)
Pamplona
Volta a Catalunya
1943
Santander
