= List of cyclists in the 1945 Vuelta a España =

For the 1945 Vuelta a España, the field consisted of 52 riders; 26 finished the race.

== By rider ==
Legend
No.	Starting number worn by the rider during the Vuelta
Pos.	Position in the general classification
DNF	Denotes a rider who did not finish

No.	Name	Nationality	Pos.	Ref
1	Joaquín Bailon	Spain	DNF	
2	Julián Berrendero	Spain	2	
3	Benito Cabestreros	Spain	DNF	
4	Bernardo Capó	Spain	8	
5	Vicente Carretero	Spain	DNF	
6	Miguel Casas	Spain	18	
7	Manuel Costa	Spain	11	
8	Diego Chafer	Spain	7	
9	Cipriano Elys	Spain	DNF	
10	Francisco Expósito	Spain	DNF	
11	Serafín Fernández	Spain	DNF	
12	Alejandro Fombellida	Spain	9	
13	Pedro Font	Spain	10	
14	José Gándara	Spain	DNF	
15	Juan Gimeno	Spain	3	
16	Miguel Gual	Spain	4	
17	José Gutiérrez	Spain	13	
18	Joaquín Jiménez	Spain	21	
19	Dalmacio Langarica	Spain	14	
20	José Lizarralde	Spain	26	
21	Martín Mancisidor	Spain	DNF	
22	Antonio Martín	Spain	5	
23	Vicente Miró	Spain	20	
24	Andrés Morán	Spain	DNF	
25	Antonio Montes	Spain	DNF	
26	Joaquín Olmos	Spain	12	
27	Gabriel Palmer	Spain	16	
28	Emilio Rodríguez	Spain	DNF	
29	Delio Rodríguez	Spain	1	
30	Pastor Rodríguez	Spain	15	
31	Bernardo Ruiz	Spain	22	
32	Antonio Andrés Sancho	Spain	19	
33	Fermín Trueba	Spain	DNF	
34	Félix Vidaurreta	Spain	24	
35	José Vidal	Spain	DNF	
36	Máximo Dermit	Spain	DNF	
37	Artur Dorsé	Spain	DNF	
38	Julian Feito	Spain	DNF	
39	José Gras	Spain	DNF	
40	Enrique Laguna	Spain	DNF	
41	José Lahoz	Spain	DNF	
42	Juan Parra	Spain	DNF	
43	Antonio Rodriguez	Spain	DNF	
44	Juan Vila	Spain	DNF	
45	Aniceto Bruno	Portugal	23	
46	Império dos Santos	Portugal	25	
47	Francisco Inácio	Portugal	DNF	
48	Eduardo Lopes	Portugal	DNF	
49	João Lourenço	Portugal	DNF	
50	Júlio Mourão	Portugal	17	
51	Jorge Pereira	Portugal	DNF	
52	João Rebelo	Portugal	6	
