= List of cyclists in the 1946 Vuelta a España =

For the 1946 Vuelta a España, the field consisted of 48 riders; 29 finished the race.

Legend
| No. | Starting number worn by the rider during the Vuelta |
| Pos. | Position in the general classification |
| DNF | Denotes a rider who did not finish |

| No. | Name | Nationality | Pos. |
|---|---|---|---|
| 1 | João Rebelo | Portugal | 10 |
| 2 | João Lourenço | Portugal | 29 |
| 3 | Jorge Pereira | Portugal | 27 |
| 4 | Manuel Rocha | Portugal | DNF |
| 5 | Aristides Martins | Portugal | 28 |
| 6 | Ernest Kuhn | Switzerland | 17 |
| 7 | Georges Aeschlimann | Switzerland | 11 |
| 8 | Kurt Zaugg | Switzerland | 26 |
| 9 | Theo Perret | Switzerland | 25 |
| 10 | Stefan Peterhans | Switzerland | DNF |
| 11 | John Lambrichts | Netherlands | 3 |
| 12 | Cees van de Voorde | Netherlands | DNF |
| 13 | Hubert Sijen | Netherlands | DNF |
| 14 | Frans Pauwels | Netherlands | 20 |
| 15 | Cees Joosen | Netherlands | 23 |
| 16 | Jef Janssen | Netherlands | DNF |
| 17 | Cipriano Aguirrezabal | Spain | 12 |
| 18 | Julián Berrendero | Spain | 2 |
| 19 | José Cano | Spain | DNF |
| 20 | Bernardo Capó | Spain | DNF |
| 21 | Vicente Carretero | Spain | DNF |
| 22 | Manuel Costa | Spain | 4 |
| 23 | Alejandro Fombellida | Spain | 6 |
| 24 | Pedro Font | Spain | 22 |
| 25 | José Gándara | Spain | DNF |
| 26 | Antonio Gelabert | Spain | DNF |
| 27 | Juan Gimeno | Spain | DNF |
| 28 | Miguel Gual | Spain | DNF |
| 29 | José Gutiérrez | Spain | 9 |
| 30 | Joaquín Jiménez Mata | Spain | 21 |
| 31 | José Antonio Landa | Spain | DNF |
| 32 | Dalmacio Langarica | Spain | 1 |
| 33 | Pascual Laza | Spain | DNF |
| 34 | José Lizarralde | Spain | DNF |
| 35 | José López Gandara | Spain | 19 |
| 36 | Antonio Martín | Spain | 16 |
| 37 | Vicente Miró | Spain | 18 |
| 38 | Joaquín Olmos | Spain | 15 |
| 39 | Ignacio Orbaiceta | Spain | DNF |
| 40 | Gabriel Palmer | Spain | 24 |
| 41 | Delio Rodríguez | Spain | 5 |
| 42 | Emilio Rodríguez | Spain | 8 |
| 43 | Pastor Rodríguez | Spain | 14 |
| 44 | Bernardo Ruiz | Spain | 13 |
| 45 | Antonio Andrés Sancho | Spain | 7 |
| 46 | Lorenzo Sastre | Spain | DNF |
| 47 | José Vidal | Spain | DNF |
| 48 | Félix Vidaurreta | Spain | DNF |
