= 1946 Vuelta a España, Stage 1 to Stage 12 =

Long-distance bicycle race stages

The 1946 Vuelta a España was the 6th edition of Vuelta a España, one of cycling's Grand Tours. The Tour began in Madrid on 7 May and Stage 12 occurred on 18 May with a stage to Barcelona. The race finished in Madrid on 30 May.

== Stage 1 ==
7 May 1946 - Madrid to Salamanca, 212 km (131.7 mi)

Stage 1 result and general classification after Stage 1

Rank	Rider	Time
1	Joaquín Olmos (ESP)	7h 38' 13"
2	Antonio Martín (ESP)	s.t.
3	Cees van de Voorde (NED)	s.t.
4	João Rebelo (POR)	s.t.
5	Dalmacio Langarica (ESP)	s.t.
6	João Lourenço (POR)	s.t.
7	Jorge Pereira (POR)	s.t.
8	John Lambrichts (NED)	s.t.
9	Hubert Sijen (NED)	s.t.
10	Frans Pauwels (NED)	s.t.

== Stage 2 ==
8 May 1946 - Salamanca to Béjar, 73 km (45.4 mi) (ITT)

Stage 2 result

Rank	Rider	Time
1	Miguel Gual (ESP)	2h 06' 32"
2	Antonio Martín (ESP)	s.t.
3	Ignacio Orbaiceta (ESP)	s.t.
4	Bernardo Capó (ESP)	+ 7"
5	Dalmacio Langarica (ESP)	+ 24"
6	Joaquín Olmos (ESP)	s.t.
7	Delio Rodríguez (ESP)	s.t.
8	Juan Gimeno (ESP)	s.t.
9	Antonio Andrés Sancho (ESP)	s.t.
10	John Lambrichts (NED)	+ 25"

== Stage 3 ==
8 May 1946 - Béjar to Cáceres, 141 km (88 mi)

Stage 3 result

Rank	Rider	Time
1	Antonio Andrés Sancho (ESP)	4h 46' 53"
2	Dalmacio Langarica (ESP)	s.t.
3	Delio Rodríguez (ESP)	s.t.
4	Julián Berrendero (ESP)	s.t.
5	Alejandro Fombellida (ESP)	s.t.
6	Manuel Costa (ESP)	+ 13"
7	Cees van de Voorde (NED)	+ 1' 04"
8	Joaquín Jiménez Mata (ESP)	+ 14' 03"
9	José Vidal (ESP)	+ 17' 00"
10	Bernardo Capó (ESP)	+ 17' 51"

General classification after Stage 3

Rank	Rider	Time
1	Dalmacio Langarica (ESP)	14h 32' 02"
2	Antonio Andrés Sancho (ESP)	s.t.
3	Delio Rodríguez (ESP)	s.t.
4	Cees van de Voorde (NED)	+ 1' 09"
5	Julián Berrendero (ESP)	+ 1' 19"
6	Alejandro Fombellida (ESP)	+ 5' 05"
7	Manuel Costa (ESP)	+ 7' 59"
8	Bernardo Capó (ESP)	+ 17' 34"
9	Joaquín Jiménez Mata (ESP)	+ 18' 39"
10	Kurt Zaugg (SUI)	+ 25' 02"

== Stage 4 ==
9 May 1946 - Cáceres to Badajoz, 132 km (82 mi)

Stage 4 result

Rank	Rider	Time
1	Ignacio Orbaiceta (ESP)	4h 42' 31"
2	Alejandro Fombellida (ESP)	s.t.
3	Miguel Gual (ESP)	s.t.
4	José Vidal (ESP)	s.t.
5	João Rebelo (POR)	s.t.
6	João Lourenço (POR)	s.t.
7	Jorge Pereira (POR)	s.t.
8	Antonio Martín (ESP)	s.t.
9	Manuel Rocha (POR)	s.t.
10	John Lambrichts (NED)	s.t.

General classification after Stage 4

Rank	Rider	Time
1	Dalmacio Langarica (ESP)	19h 14' 33"
2	Antonio Andrés Sancho (ESP)	s.t.
3	Delio Rodríguez (ESP)	s.t.
4	Cees van de Voorde (NED)	+ 1' 09"
5	Julián Berrendero (ESP)	+ 1' 19"
6	Alejandro Fombellida (ESP)	+ 5' 05"
7	Manuel Costa (ESP)	+ 8' 05"
8	Bernardo Capó (ESP)	+ 17' 34"
9	Joaquín Jiménez Mata (ESP)	+ 18' 39"
10	Kurt Zaugg (SUI)	+ 25' 02"

== Stage 5 ==
10 May 1946 - Badajoz to Seville, 218 km (135 mi)

Stage 5 result

Rank	Rider	Time
1	Julián Berrendero (ESP)	7h 47' 37"
2	Delio Rodríguez (ESP)	s.t.
3	Manuel Costa (ESP)	+ 45"
4	Hubert Sijen (NED)	+ 1' 53"
5	José Antonio Landa (ESP)	+ 2' 36"
6	José López Gandara (ESP)	+ 2' 43"
7	Ignacio Orbaiceta (ESP)	+ 3' 38"
8	Pastor Rodríguez (ESP)	s.t.
9	Cees van de Voorde (NED)	s.t.
10	Jef Janssen (NED)	s.t.

General classification after Stage 5

Rank	Rider	Time
1	Delio Rodríguez (ESP)	27h 02' 10"
2	Julián Berrendero (ESP)	+ 1' 19"
3	Dalmacio Langarica (ESP)	+ 3' 38"
4	Cees van de Voorde (NED)	+ 4' 47"
5	Antonio Andrés Sancho (ESP)	+ 5' 22"
6	Alejandro Fombellida (ESP)	+ 8' 43"
7	Manuel Costa (ESP)	+ 8' 44"
8	Bernardo Capó (ESP)	+ 22' 40"
9	Joaquín Jiménez Mata (ESP)	+ 27' 20"
10	Georges Aeschlimann (SUI)	+ 28' 40"

== Stage 6 ==
12 May 1946 - Seville to Granada, 251 km (156 mi)

Stage 6 result

Rank	Rider	Time
1	John Lambrichts (NED)	6h 35' 09"
2	Manuel Costa (ESP)	s.t.
3	Dalmacio Langarica (ESP)	+ 27' 06"
4	Kurt Zaugg (SUI)	s.t.
5	Cees Joosen (NED)	s.t.
6	Stefan Peterhans (SUI)	s.t.
7	José Gutiérrez (ESP)	s.t.
8	Alejandro Fombellida (ESP)	+ 31' 02"
9	Emilio Rodríguez (ESP)	+ 31' 58"
10	Pastor Rodríguez (ESP)	s.t.

General classification after Stage 6

Rank	Rider	Time
1	Manuel Costa (ESP)	33h 46' 03"
2	Dalmacio Langarica (ESP)	+ 22' 00"
3	John Lambrichts (NED)	+ 23' 01"
4	Julián Berrendero (ESP)	+ 24' 33"
5	Alejandro Fombellida (ESP)	+ 31' 01"
6	Antonio Andrés Sancho (ESP)	+ 33' 56"
7	Delio Rodríguez (ESP)	+ 38' 34"
8	Kurt Zaugg (SUI)	+ 48' 38"
9	Cees van de Voorde (NED)	+ 50' 19"
10	Georges Aeschlimann (SUI)	+ 51' 54"

== Stage 7 ==
13 May 1946 - Granada to Baza, 107 km (66 mi)

== Stage 8 ==
14 May 1946 - Baza to Murcia, 178 km (111 mi)

Stage 8 result

Rank	Rider	Time
1	João Lourenço (POR)	6h 10' 14"
2	Delio Rodríguez (ESP)	s.t.
3	Cees van de Voorde (NED)	s.t.
4	Miguel Gual (ESP)	s.t.
5	Frans Pauwels (NED)	s.t.
6	Alejandro Fombellida (ESP)	s.t.
7	João Rebelo (POR)	s.t.
8	Jorge Pereira (POR)	s.t.
9	Antonio Martín (ESP)	s.t.
10	John Lambrichts (NED)	s.t.

General classification after Stage 8

Rank	Rider	Time
1	Manuel Costa (ESP)	43h 35' 23"
2	Dalmacio Langarica (ESP)	+ 21' 12"
3	John Lambrichts (NED)	+ 25' 54"
4	Julián Berrendero (ESP)	s.t.
5	Alejandro Fombellida (ESP)	+ 33' 32"
6	Delio Rodríguez (ESP)	+ 38' 34"
7	Antonio Andrés Sancho (ESP)	+ 46' 49"
8	Kurt Zaugg (SUI)	+ 51' 31"
9	Cees van de Voorde (NED)	+ 53' 12"
10	Jef Janssen (NED)	+ 55' 27"

== Stage 9 ==
15 May 1946 - Murcia to Valencia, 264 km (164 mi)

Stage 9 result

Rank	Rider	Time
1	Alejandro Fombellida (ESP)	9h 00' 25"
2	Jorge Pereira (POR)	s.t.
3	Joaquín Olmos (ESP)	s.t.
4	Vicente Miró (ESP)	+ 1' 07"
5	Dalmacio Langarica (ESP)	+ 1' 50"
6	Miguel Gual (ESP)	s.t.
7	Bernardo Ruiz (ESP)	s.t.
8	João Rebelo (POR)	s.t.
9	Frans Pauwels (NED)	+ 2' 07"
10	Emilio Rodríguez (ESP)	+ 2' 52"

General classification after Stage 9

Rank	Rider	Time
1	Manuel Costa (ESP)	52h 40' 43"
2	Dalmacio Langarica (ESP)	+ 18' 07"
3	John Lambrichts (NED)	+ 26' 34"
4	Julián Berrendero (ESP)	+ 28' 16"
5	Alejandro Fombellida (ESP)	+ 38' 37"
6	Delio Rodríguez (ESP)	+ 38' 34"
7	Antonio Andrés Sancho (ESP)	+ 44' 46"
8	Cees van de Voorde (NED)	+ 53' 52"
9	Kurt Zaugg (SUI)	s.t.
10	Jef Janssen (NED)	+ 56' 05"

== Stage 10 ==
17 May 1946 - Valencia to Castellón, 67 km (42 mi) (TTT)

Stage 10 result

Rank	Rider	Time
1	John Lambrichts (NED)	1h 34' 17"
2	Hubert Sijen (NED)	s.t.
3	Cees van de Voorde (NED)	s.t.
4	Cees Joosen (NED)	s.t.
5	Frans Pauwels (NED)	s.t.
6	Delio Rodríguez (ESP)	+ 1' 16"
7	Dalmacio Langarica (ESP)	s.t.
8	Julián Berrendero (ESP)	s.t.
9	Joaquín Olmos (ESP)	s.t.
10	Antonio Andrés Sancho (ESP)	s.t.

== Stage 11 ==
17 May 1946 - Castellón to Tortosa, 123 km (76 mi)

Stage 11 result

Rank	Rider	Time
1	Alejandro Fombellida (ESP)	3h 52' 43"
2	Cipriano Aguirrezabal (ESP)	s.t.
3	João Lourenço (POR)	s.t.
4	Gabriel Palmer (ESP)	s.t.
5	Cees van de Voorde (NED)	s.t.
6	Joaquín Jiménez Mata (ESP)	s.t.
7	Antonio Martín (ESP)	s.t.
8	Manuel Costa (ESP)	s.t.
9	Miguel Gual (ESP)	s.t.
10	João Rebelo (POR)	s.t.

General classification after Stage 11

Rank	Rider	Time
1	Manuel Costa (ESP)	58h 11' 27"
2	Dalmacio Langarica (ESP)	+ 15' 39"
3	John Lambrichts (NED)	+ 22' 50"
4	Julián Berrendero (ESP)	+ 25' 38"
5	Alejandro Fombellida (ESP)	+ 38' 37"
6	Delio Rodríguez (ESP)	+ 36' 06"
7	Antonio Andrés Sancho (ESP)	+ 42' 18"
8	Cees van de Voorde (NED)	+ 49' 38"
9	Kurt Zaugg (SUI)	+ 54' 29"
10	Emilio Rodríguez (ESP)	+ 58' 03"

== Stage 12 ==
18 May 1946 - Tortosa to Barcelona, 215 km (134 mi)

Stage 12 result

Rank	Rider	Time
1	Dalmacio Langarica (ESP)	7h 07' 10"
2	Manuel Costa (ESP)	s.t.
3	Frans Pauwels (NED)	s.t.
4	Bernardo Ruiz (ESP)	s.t.
5	João Rebelo (POR)	+ 1' 32"
6	Delio Rodríguez (ESP)	+ 7' 23"
7	Antonio Martín (ESP)	s.t.
8	John Lambrichts (NED)	s.t.
9	Hubert Sijen (NED)	s.t.
10	Cees Joosen (NED)	s.t.

General classification after Stage 12

Rank	Rider	Time
1	Manuel Costa (ESP)	65h 18' 37"
2	Dalmacio Langarica (ESP)	+ 15' 39"
3	John Lambrichts (NED)	+ 30' 13"
4	Julián Berrendero (ESP)	+ 33' 01"
5	Alejandro Fombellida (ESP)	+ 36' 00"
6	Delio Rodríguez (ESP)	+ 43' 29"
7	Antonio Andrés Sancho (ESP)	+ 49' 41"
8	Kurt Zaugg (SUI)	+ 1h 01' 52"
9	Cees van de Voorde (NED)	+ 1h 03' 31"
10	Emilio Rodríguez (ESP)	+ 1h 05' 26"
