= 1945 Vuelta a España, Stage 1 to Stage 9 =

Long-distance bicycle race stages

The 1945 Vuelta a España was the 5th edition of Vuelta a España, one of cycling's Grand Tours. The Tour began in Madrid on 10 May and Stage 9 occurred on 20 May with a stage to Barcelona. The race finished in Madrid on 31 May.

== Stage 1 ==
10 May 1945 - Madrid to Salamanca, 212 km (131.7 mi)

Stage 1 result and general classification after Stage 1

Rank	Rider	Time
1	Julián Berrendero (ESP)	6h 30' 37"
2	Miguel Gual (ESP)	+ 2' 32"
3	Bernardo Capó (ESP)	+ 2' 43"
4	Juan Gimeno (ESP)	+ 2' 45"
5	José Gutiérrez (ESP)	+ 2' 52"
6	Cipriano Elys (ESP)	+ 3' 10"
7	Dalmacio Langarica (ESP)	s.t.
8	João Rebelo (POR)	+ 3' 29"
9	Delio Rodríguez (ESP)	s.t.
10	Pastor Rodríguez (ESP)	+ 9' 33"

== Stage 2 ==
11 May 1945 - Salamanca to Cáceres, 214 km (133.0 mi)

Stage 2 result

Rank	Rider	Time
1	Delio Rodríguez (ESP)	7h 07' 25"
2	Joaquín Bailon (ESP)	+ 16' 53"
3	Miguel Gual (ESP)	+ 33' 27"
4	Alejandro Fombellida (ESP)	s.t.
5	Joaquín Olmos (ESP)	s.t.
6	Julián Berrendero (ESP)	s.t.
7	Bernardo Capó (ESP)	s.t.
8	Juan Gimeno (ESP)	s.t.
9	José Gutiérrez (ESP)	s.t.
10	Cipriano Elys (ESP)	s.t.

General classification after Stage 2

Rank	Rider	Time
1	Delio Rodríguez (ESP)	13h 41' 31"
2	Julián Berrendero (ESP)	+ 30' 58"
3	Miguel Gual (ESP)	+ 32' 30"
4	Bernardo Capó (ESP)	+ 32' 39"
5	Juan Gimeno (ESP)	+ 32' 43"
6	José Gutiérrez (ESP)	+ 32' 50"
7	Cipriano Elys (ESP)	+ 33' 08"
8	Dalmacio Langarica (ESP)	s.t.
9	João Rebelo (POR)	+ 33' 27"
10	Pastor Rodríguez (ESP)	+ 39' 31"

== Stage 3 ==
12 May 1945 - Cáceres to Badajoz, 132 km (82 mi)

Stage 3 result

Rank	Rider	Time
1	Miguel Gual (ESP)	3h 47' 11"
2	Juan Gimeno (ESP)	+ 1' 00"
3	Eduardo Lopes (POR)	s.t.
4	Gabriel Palmer (ESP)	s.t.
5	Bernardo Capó (ESP)	s.t.
6	Alejandro Fombellida (ESP)	+ 9' 01"
7	Pastor Rodríguez (ESP)	s.t.
8	Vicente Miró (ESP)	s.t.
9	José Gutiérrez (ESP)	s.t.
10	João Lourenço (POR)	s.t.

General classification after Stage 3

Rank	Rider	Time
1	Delio Rodríguez (ESP)	17h 37' 43"
2	Miguel Gual (ESP)	+ 23' 29"
3	Bernardo Capó (ESP)	+ 34' 40"
4	Juan Gimeno (ESP)	+ 34' 42"
5	Julián Berrendero (ESP)	+ 29' 58"
6	Gabriel Palmer (ESP)	+ 31' 30"
7	José Gutiérrez (ESP)	+ 32' 10"
8	Cipriano Elys (ESP)	+ 33' 08"
9	Dalmacio Langarica (ESP)	s.t.
10	João Rebelo (POR)	+ 33' 27"

== Stage 4a ==
13 May 1945 - Badajoz to Almendralejo, 57 km (35 mi) (ITT)

Stage 4a result

Rank	Rider	Time
1	Juan Gimeno (ESP)	1h 40' 05"
2	Julián Berrendero (ESP)	+ 1' 55"
3	Francisco Inácio (POR)	+ 2' 03"
4	José Gutiérrez (ESP)	+ 2' 22"
5	Bernardo Capó (ESP)	+ 2' 41"
6	Vicente Miró (ESP)	+ 3' 26"
7	Cipriano Elys (ESP)	+ 4' 20"
8	Miguel Gual (ESP)	+ 4' 43"
9	Artur Dorsé (ESP)	+ 5' 09"
10	Joaquín Olmos (ESP)	+ 5' 14"

== Stage 4b ==
13 May 1945 - Almendralejo to Sevilla, 171 km (106 mi)

Stage 4b result

Rank	Rider	Time
1	Vicente Miró (ESP)	5h 44' 41"
2	Delio Rodríguez (ESP)	
3	Aniceto Bruno (POR)	+ 15' 16"
4	Joaquín Jiménez (ESP)	+ 16' 39"
5	João Rebelo (POR)	s.t.
6	Pedro Font (ESP)	s.t.
7	Antonio Montes (ESP)	s.t.
8	Alejandro Fombellida (ESP)	s.t.
9	Diego Chafer (ESP)	s.t.
10	Manuel Costa (ESP)	s.t.

General classification after Stage 4b

Rank	Rider	Time
1	Delio Rodríguez (ESP)	25h 12' 21"
2	Juan Gimeno (ESP)	+ 31' 23"
3	Bernardo Capó (ESP)	+ 35' 04"
4	Miguel Gual (ESP)	+ 35' 24"
5	Julián Berrendero (ESP)	+ 39' 01"
6	Vicente Miró (ESP)	+ 44' 19"
7	Cipriano Elys (ESP)	+ 45' 11"
8	João Rebelo (POR)	+ 47' 37"
9	José Gutiérrez (ESP)	+ 48' 55"
10	Gabriel Palmer (ESP)	+ 51' 30"

== Stage 5 ==
15 May 1945 - Sevilla to Granada, 251 km (156 mi)

Stage 5 result

Rank	Rider	Time
1	Antonio Montes (ESP)	8h 50' 47"
2	Miguel Gual (ESP)	+ 26' 18"
3	Joaquín Olmos (ESP)	s.t.
4	Alejandro Fombellida (ESP)	s.t.
5	Antonio Martín (ESP)	s.t.
6	Joaquín Jiménez (ESP)	s.t.
7	João Rebelo (POR)	s.t.
8	Joaquín Bailon (ESP)	s.t.
9	Júlio Mourão (POR)	s.t.
10	José Gutiérrez (ESP)	s.t.

General classification after Stage 5

Rank	Rider	Time
1	Delio Rodríguez (ESP)	34h 29' 26"
2	Juan Gimeno (ESP)	+ 31' 23"
3	Bernardo Capó (ESP)	+ 35' 04"
4	Miguel Gual (ESP)	+ 35' 24"
5	Julián Berrendero (ESP)	+ 39' 01"
6	Vicente Miró (ESP)	+ 44' 15"
7	Cipriano Elys (ESP)	+ 45' 11"
8	João Rebelo (POR)	+ 47' 37"
9	José Gutiérrez (ESP)	+ 48' 55"
10	Dalmacio Langarica (ESP)	+ 53' 20"

== Stage 6 ==
16 May 1945 - Granada to Murcia, 285 km (177 mi)

Stage 6 result

Rank	Rider	Time
1	Joaquín Olmos (ESP)	12h 04' 04"
2	Miguel Gual (ESP)	s.t.
3	Alejandro Fombellida (ESP)	+ 1' 00"
4	Antonio Martín (ESP)	s.t.
5	Pedro Font (ESP)	s.t.
6	João Rebelo (POR)	s.t.
7	Júlio Mourão (POR)	s.t.
8	José Gutiérrez (ESP)	s.t.
9	Antonio Montes (ESP)	s.t.
10	Gabriel Palmer (ESP)	s.t.

General classification after Stage 6

Rank	Rider	Time
1	Delio Rodríguez (ESP)	46h 34' 30"
2	Juan Gimeno (ESP)	+ 31' 23"
3	Miguel Gual (ESP)	+ 34' 24"
4	Bernardo Capó (ESP)	+ 35' 04"
5	Julián Berrendero (ESP)	+ 39' 01"
6	Vicente Miró (ESP)	+ 44' 15"
7	Cipriano Elys (ESP)	+ 45' 11"
8	João Rebelo (POR)	+ 47' 37"
9	José Gutiérrez (ESP)	+ 48' 55"
10	Dalmacio Langarica (ESP)	+ 53' 20"

== Stage 7 ==
17 May 1945 - Murcia to Valencia, 244 km (152 mi)

Stage 7 result

Rank	Rider	Time
1	Delio Rodríguez (ESP)	9h 31' 54"
2	Antonio Martín (ESP)	+ 1' 00"
3	Julián Berrendero (ESP)	s.t.
4	Diego Chafer (ESP)	s.t.
5	Juan Gimeno (ESP)	s.t.
6	Miguel Casas (ESP)	+ 26"
7	Pedro Font (ESP)	s.t.
8	Alejandro Fombellida (ESP)	s.t.
9	Manuel Costa (ESP)	s.t.
10	Joaquín Olmos (ESP)	+ 6' 39"

General classification after Stage 7

Rank	Rider	Time
1	Delio Rodríguez (ESP)	56h 06' 24"
2	Juan Gimeno (ESP)	+ 32' 23"
3	Julián Berrendero (ESP)	+ 38' 58"
4	Miguel Gual (ESP)	+ 42' 03"
5	Bernardo Capó (ESP)	+ 43' 44"
6	Manuel Costa (ESP)	+ 57' 17"
7	Alejandro Fombellida (ESP)	+ 58' 49"
8	Pedro Font (ESP)	+ 1h 03' 08"
9	Antonio Martín (ESP)	+ 1h 03' 25"
10	Cipriano Elys (ESP)	+ 1h 05' 47"

== Stage 8 ==
19 May 1945 - Valencia to Tortosa, 163.5 km (101.6 mi)

Stage 8 result

Rank	Rider	Time
1	Delio Rodríguez (ESP)	6h 13' 12"
2	Alejandro Fombellida (ESP)	+ 1' 00"
3	Miguel Casas (ESP)	s.t.
4	Antonio Martín (ESP)	s.t.
5	Juan Gimeno (ESP)	s.t.
6	Julián Berrendero (ESP)	s.t.
7	Joaquín Olmos (ESP)	s.t.
8	Dalmacio Langarica (ESP)	s.t.
9	Cipriano Elys (ESP)	s.t.
10	Antonio Montes (ESP)	+ 1' 35"

General classification after Stage 8

Rank	Rider	Time
1	Delio Rodríguez (ESP)	62h 19' 36"
2	Juan Gimeno (ESP)	+ 33' 23"
3	Julián Berrendero (ESP)	+ 39' 58"
4	Miguel Gual (ESP)	+ 43' 39"
5	Bernardo Capó (ESP)	+ 45' 20"
6	Manuel Costa (ESP)	+ 58' 53"
7	Alejandro Fombellida (ESP)	+ 59' 49"
8	Antonio Martín (ESP)	+ 1h 04' 25"
9	Pedro Font (ESP)	+ 1h 04' 44"
10	Cipriano Elys (ESP)	+ 1h 06' 47"

== Stage 9 ==
20 May 1945 - Tortosa to Barcelona, 288 km (179 mi)

Stage 9 result

Rank	Rider	Time
1	Miguel Gual (ESP)	7h 01' 15"
2	Pedro Font (ESP)	+ 1' 00"
3	João Rebelo (POR)	s.t.
4	Alejandro Fombellida (ESP)	+ 1' 30"
5	Joaquín Olmos (ESP)	s.t.
6	Antonio Andrés Sancho (ESP)	s.t.
7	Antonio Martín (ESP)	s.t.
8	Julián Berrendero (ESP)	s.t.
9	Juan Gimeno (ESP)	s.t.
10	Manuel Costa (ESP)	s.t.

General classification after Stage 9

Rank	Rider	Time
1	Delio Rodríguez (ESP)	69h 22' 12"
2	Juan Gimeno (ESP)	+ 33' 23"
3	Julián Berrendero (ESP)	+ 39' 58"
4	Miguel Gual (ESP)	+ 42' 18"
5	Bernardo Capó (ESP)	+ 46' 24"
6	Manuel Costa (ESP)	+ 59' 53"
7	Alejandro Fombellida (ESP)	+ 59' 49"
8	Pedro Font (ESP)	+ 1h 03' 47"
9	Antonio Martín (ESP)	+ 1h 04' 25"
10	Diego Chafer (ESP)	+ 1h 07' 30"
