= List of cyclists in the 1942 Vuelta a España =

For the 1942 Vuelta a España, the field consisted of 40 riders; 18 finished the race.

Legend
| No. | Starting number worn by the rider during the Vuelta |
| Pos. | Position in the general classification |
| DNF | Denotes a rider who did not finish |

| No. | Name | Nationality | Pos. |
|---|---|---|---|
| 1 | Fermo Camellini | Italy | 10 |
| 2 | Celestino Camilla | Italy | 16 |
| 3 | Pierre Brambilla | Italy | 17 |
| 4 | Georges Meunier | France | DNF |
| 5 | René Vietto | France | 14 |
| 6 | Dante Gianello | France | DNF |
| 7 | Victor Cosson | France | DNF |
| 8 | Louis Thiétard | France | 15 |
| 9 | Lucien Lauk | France | DNF |
| 10 | Antonio Andres Sancho | Spain | 3 |
| 11 | Joaquín Olmos | Spain | 13 |
| 12 | Juan Gimeno | Spain | 4 |
| 13 | José Botanch | Spain | 9 |
| 14 | José Campama | Spain | DNF |
| 15 | Julián Berrendero | Spain | 1 |
| 16 | Antonio Martin | Spain | DNF |
| 17 | José Jabardo | Spain | 6 |
| 18 | Vicente Carretero | Spain | DNF |
| 19 | Miguel Monzon | Spain | DNF |
| 20 | Fermín Trueba | Spain | DNF |
| 21 | Isidro Bejarano | Spain | 8 |
| 22 | Cipriano Elys | Spain | 5 |
| 23 | Diego Chafer | Spain | 2 |
| 24 | Manuel Capella | Spain | DNF |
| 25 | Vicente Miró | Spain | 12 |
| 26 | Alberto Carrasco | Spain | 11 |
| 27 | Antonio Escuriet | Spain | DNF |
| 28 | Agustin Miro | Spain | DNF |
| 29 | Andres Canals | Spain | DNF |
| 30 | Andres Martorell | Spain | DNF |
| 31 | Enrique Laguna | Spain | DNF |
| 32 | Martin Abadia | Spain | DNF |
| 33 | Antonio Destrieux | Spain | 18 |
| 34 | Benito Cabestreros | Spain | DNF |
| 35 | Jose Cano | Spain | DNF |
| 36 | Delio Rodríguez | Spain | 7 |
| 37 | Luis Goicoechea | Spain | DNF |
| 38 | Ricardo Vila | Spain | DNF |
| 39 | Félix Vidaurreta | Spain | DNF |
| 40 | Bonifacio Arribas | Spain | DNF |
