= 1942 Vuelta a España, Stage 1 to Stage 10 =

Long-distance bicycle race stages

The 1942 Vuelta a España was the 4th edition of Vuelta a España, one of cycling's Grand Tours. The Tour began in Madrid on 30 June and Stage 10 occurred on 9 July with a stage to Santander. The race finished in Madrid on 19 July.

== Stage 1 ==
30 June 1942 - Madrid to Albacete, 245 km (152.2 mi)

Stage 1 result and General Classification after Stage 1

Rank	Rider	Time
1	Julián Berrendero (ESP)	8h 38' 10"
2	Antonio Andres Sancho (ESP)	s.t.
3	Georges Meunier (FRA)	+ 5' 25"
4	Lucien Lauk (FRA)	s.t.
5	Diego Chafer (ESP)	+ 5' 29"
6	Joaquín Olmos (ESP)	+ 19' 04"
7	Cipriano Elys (ESP)	s.t.
8	Vicente Carretero (ESP)	+ 22' 52"
9	Fermo Camellini (ITA)	s.t.
10	Victor Cosson (FRA)	s.t.

== Stage 2 ==
1 July 1942 - Albacete to Murcia, 160 km (99.4 mi)

Stage 2 result

Rank	Rider	Time
1	Delio Rodríguez (ESP)	5h 26' 30"
2	Fermo Camellini (ITA)	s.t.
3	Georges Meunier (FRA)	+ 11"
4	Juan Gimeno (ESP)	s.t.
5	Lucien Lauk (FRA)	s.t.
6	Vicente Miró (ESP)	s.t.
7	Vicente Carretero (ESP)	s.t.
8	Celestino Camilla (ITA)	s.t.
9	Pierre Brambilla (ITA)	s.t.
10	René Vietto (FRA)	s.t.

General classification after Stage 2

Rank	Rider	Time
1	Julián Berrendero (ESP)	14h 04' 51"
2	Antonio Andres Sancho (ESP)	s.t.
3	Georges Meunier (FRA)	+ 5' 25"
4	Lucien Lauk (FRA)	s.t.
5	Diego Chafer (ESP)	+ 5' 29"
6	Joaquín Olmos (ESP)	+ 19' 04"
7	Cipriano Elys (ESP)	s.t.
8	Delio Rodríguez (ESP)	+ 22' 41"
9	Fermo Camellini (ITA)	s.t.
10	Vicente Carretero (ESP)	+ 22' 52"

== Stage 3 ==
2 July 1942 - Murcia to Valencia, 248 km (154 mi)

Stage 3 result

Rank	Rider	Time
1	José Jabardo (ESP)	8h 32' 41"
2	Juan Gimeno (ESP)	s.t.
3	Antonio Destrieux (ESP)	s.t.
4	Vicente Miró (ESP)	s.t.
5	Agustin Miro (ESP)	s.t.
6	Joaquín Olmos (ESP)	+ 17' 26"
7	Julián Berrendero (ESP)	s.t.
8	Delio Rodríguez (ESP)	s.t.
9	Fermo Camellini (ITA)	s.t.
10	Georges Meunier (FRA)	s.t.

General classification after Stage 3

Rank	Rider	Time
1	Julián Berrendero (ESP)	22h 54' 58"
2	Antonio Andres Sancho (ESP)	s.t.
3	Georges Meunier (FRA)	+ 5' 25"
4	Juan Gimeno (ESP)	+ 5' 26"
5	Vicente Miró (ESP)	s.t.
6	Diego Chafer (ESP)	+ 5' 29"
7	Joaquín Olmos (ESP)	+ 19' 04"
8	Cipriano Elys (ESP)	+ 22' 07"
9	Delio Rodríguez (ESP)	+ 22' 41"
10	Fermo Camellini (ITA)	s.t.

== Stage 4 ==
4 July 1942 - Valencia to Tarragona, 278 km (173 mi)

Stage 4 result

Rank	Rider	Time
1	Delio Rodríguez (ESP)	9h 15' 50"
2	Louis Thiétard (FRA)	s.t.
3	Lucien Lauk (FRA)	s.t.
4	Georges Meunier (FRA)	s.t.
5	Julián Berrendero (ESP)	s.t.
6	Antonio Andres Sancho (ESP)	s.t.
7	Juan Gimeno (ESP)	s.t.
8	Vicente Miró (ESP)	s.t.
9	Diego Chafer (ESP)	s.t.
10	Joaquín Olmos (ESP)	s.t.

General classification after Stage 4

Rank	Rider	Time
1	Julián Berrendero (ESP)	32h 10' 48"
2	Antonio Andres Sancho (ESP)	s.t.
3	Georges Meunier (FRA)	+ 5' 25"
4	Juan Gimeno (ESP)	+ 5' 26"
5	Vicente Miró (ESP)	s.t.
6	Diego Chafer (ESP)	+ 5' 29"
7	Joaquín Olmos (ESP)	+ 19' 04"
8	Cipriano Elys (ESP)	+ 21' 07"
9	Delio Rodríguez (ESP)	+ 22' 41"
10	Fermo Camellini (ITA)	s.t.

== Stage 5 ==
5 July 1942 - Tarragona to Barcelona, 120 km (75 mi)

Stage 5 result

Rank	Rider	Time
1	Delio Rodríguez (ESP)	3h 07' 50"
2	Joaquín Olmos (ESP)	s.t.
3	Louis Thiétard (FRA)	s.t.
4	Fermo Camellini (ITA)	s.t.
5	Celestino Camilla (ITA)	s.t.
6	Pierre Brambilla (ITA)	s.t.
7	Georges Meunier (FRA)	s.t.
8	René Vietto (FRA)	s.t.
9	Victor Cosson (FRA)	s.t.
10	Lucien Lauk (FRA)	s.t.

General classification after Stage 5

Rank	Rider	Time
1	Julián Berrendero (ESP)	35h 18' 38"
2	Antonio Andres Sancho (ESP)	s.t.
3	Georges Meunier (FRA)	+ 5' 25"
4	Juan Gimeno (ESP)	+ 5' 26"
5	Vicente Miró (ESP)	s.t.
6	Diego Chafer (ESP)	+ 5' 29"
7	Joaquín Olmos (ESP)	+ 19' 04"
8	Cipriano Elys (ESP)	+ 22' 07"
9	Delio Rodríguez (ESP)	+ 22' 41"
10	Fermo Camellini (ITA)	s.t.

== Stage 6 ==
6 July 1942 - Barcelona to Huesca, 279 km (173 mi)

Stage 6 result

Rank	Rider	Time
1	Delio Rodríguez (ESP)	10h 15' 50"
2	Joaquín Olmos (ESP)	s.t.
3	Lucien Lauk (FRA)	s.t.
4	Louis Thiétard (FRA)	s.t.
5	Fermo Camellini (ITA)	s.t.
6	Celestino Camilla (ITA)	s.t.
7	Pierre Brambilla (ITA)	s.t.
8	René Vietto (FRA)	s.t.
9	Antonio Andres Sancho (ESP)	s.t.
10	Diego Chafer (ESP)	s.t.

General classification after Stage 6

Rank	Rider	Time
1	Julián Berrendero (ESP)	45h 34' 28"
2	Antonio Andres Sancho (ESP)	s.t.
3	Georges Meunier (FRA)	+ 5' 25"
4	Juan Gimeno (ESP)	+ 5' 26"
5	Vicente Miró (ESP)	s.t.
6	Diego Chafer (ESP)	+ 5' 29"
7	Joaquín Olmos (ESP)	+ 18' 04"
8	Cipriano Elys (ESP)	+ 22' 07"
9	Delio Rodríguez (ESP)	+ 22' 41"
10	Fermo Camellini (ITA)	s.t.

== Stage 7 ==
7 July 1942 - Huesca to San Sebastián, 305 km (190 mi)

Stage 7 result

Rank	Rider	Time
1	Delio Rodríguez (ESP)	11h 33' 17"
2	Joaquín Olmos (ESP)	s.t.
3	Lucien Lauk (FRA)	s.t.
4	Julián Berrendero (ESP)	s.t.
5	Cipriano Elys (ESP)	s.t.
6	Fermo Camellini (ITA)	s.t.
7	José Jabardo (ESP)	s.t.
8	Pierre Brambilla (ITA)	s.t.
9	René Vietto (FRA)	s.t.
10	Louis Thiétard (FRA)	s.t.

General classification after Stage 7

Rank	Rider	Time
1	Julián Berrendero (ESP)	57h 07' 45"
2	Antonio Andres Sancho (ESP)	s.t.
3	Vicente Miró (ESP)	+ 5' 26"
4	Diego Chafer (ESP)	+ 13' 35"
5	Juan Gimeno (ESP)	s.t.
6	Joaquín Olmos (ESP)	+ 19' 04"
7	Cipriano Elys (ESP)	+ 22' 07"
8	Delio Rodríguez (ESP)	+ 22' 41"
9	Fermo Camellini (ITA)	s.t.
10	José Botanch (ESP)	+ 22' 58"

== Stage 8 ==
8 July 1942 - San Sebastián to Bilbao, 160 km (99 mi)

Stage 8 result

Rank	Rider	Time
1	René Vietto (FRA)	5h 36' 15"
2	Louis Thiétard (FRA)	+ 2' 25"
3	Julián Berrendero (ESP)	s.t.
4	Fermo Camellini (ITA)	s.t.
5	Pierre Brambilla (ITA)	s.t.
6	Cipriano Elys (ESP)	s.t.
7	Isidro Bejarano (ESP)	s.t.
8	José Jabardo (ESP)	s.t.
9	José Botanch (ESP)	s.t.
10	Antonio Andres Sancho (ESP)	s.t.

== Stage 9 ==
9 July 1942 - Bilbao to Castro Urdiales, 53 km (33 mi) (ITT)

Stage 9 result

Rank	Rider	Time
1	Delio Rodríguez (ESP)	2h 03' 14"
2	Joaquín Olmos (ESP)	s.t.
3	Julián Berrendero (ESP)	s.t.
4	Louis Thiétard (FRA)	s.t.
5	René Vietto (FRA)	s.t.
6	Juan Gimeno (ESP)	s.t.
7	Antonio Andres Sancho (ESP)	s.t.
8	Cipriano Elys (ESP)	s.t.
9	Agustin Miro (ESP)	s.t.
10	Isidro Bejarano (ESP)	s.t.

General classification after Stage 9

Rank	Rider	Time
1	Julián Berrendero (ESP)	64h 49' 39"
2	Antonio Andres Sancho (ESP)	s.t.
3	Diego Chafer (ESP)	+ 5' 29"
4	Vicente Miró (ESP)	+ 13' 15"
5	Juan Gimeno (ESP)	+ 16' 34"
6	Joaquín Olmos (ESP)	+ 20' 54"
7	Cipriano Elys (ESP)	s.t.
8	Agustin Miro (ESP)	+ 24' 09"
9	José Jabardo (ESP)	s.t.
10	Delio Rodríguez (ESP)	+ 25' 40"

== Stage 10 ==
10 July 1942 - Castro Urdiales to Santander, 151 km (93.8 mi)

Stage 10 result

Rank	Rider	Time
1	Julián Berrendero (ESP)	5h 56' 10"
2	Pierre Brambilla (ITA)	+ 1' 02"
3	Fermo Camellini (ITA)	+ 1' 05"
4	Cipriano Elys (ESP)	+ 1' 14"
5	José Jabardo (ESP)	+ 1' 47"
6	Isidro Bejarano (ESP)	+ 5' 53"
7	Delio Rodríguez (ESP)	+ 7' 12"
8	Diego Chafer (ESP)	s.t.
9	Juan Gimeno (ESP)	+ 9' 46"
10	Joaquín Olmos (ESP)	s.t.

General classification after Stage 10

Rank	Rider	Time
1	Julián Berrendero (ESP)	70h 45' 49"
2	Diego Chafer (ESP)	+ 12' 41"
3	Antonio Andres Sancho (ESP)	+ 13' 20"
4	Vicente Miró (ESP)	+ 23' 01"
5	Cipriano Elys (ESP)	+ 23' 21"
6	José Jabardo (ESP)	+ 25' 58"
7	Juan Gimeno (ESP)	+ 26' 20"
8	Fermo Camellini (ITA)	+ 28' 38"
9	Joaquín Olmos (ESP)	+ 30' 35"
10	Isidro Bejarano (ESP)	+ 31' 33"
