= 1942 Vuelta a España, Stage 11 to Stage 19 =

Long-distance bicycle race stages

The 1942 Vuelta a España was the 4th edition of Vuelta a España, one of cycling's Grand Tours. The Tour began in Madrid on 30 June and Stage 11 occurred on 11 July with a stage from Santander. The race finished in Madrid on 19 July.

== Stage 11 ==
11 July 1942 - Santander to Reinosa, 120 km (74.6 mi)

Stage 11 result

Rank	Rider	Time
1	Pierre Brambilla (ITA)	4h 33' 26"
2	Isidro Bejarano (ESP)	+ 4"
3	Delio Rodríguez (ESP)	+ 1' 23"
4	Louis Thiétard (FRA)	s.t.
5	Juan Gimeno (ESP)	s.t.
6	Fermo Camellini (ITA)	+ 2' 07"
7	Agustin Miro (ESP)	+ 2' 20"
8	Celestino Camilla (ITA)	+ 2' 22"
9	Alberto Carrasco (ESP)	s.t.
10	Antonio Destrieux (ESP)	s.t.

General classification after Stage 11

Rank	Rider	Time
1	Julián Berrendero (ESP)	75h 22' 21"
2	Diego Chafer (ESP)	+ 12' 07"
3	Antonio Andres Sancho (ESP)	+ 12' 36"
4	Cipriano Elys (ESP)	+ 22' 37"
5	Juan Gimeno (ESP)	+ 24' 37"
6	José Jabardo (ESP)	+ 25' 14"
7	Vicente Miró (ESP)	+ 27' 28"
8	Fermo Camellini (ITA)	+ 27' 39"
9	Isidro Bejarano (ESP)	+ 28' 31"
10	Delio Rodríguez (ESP)	+ 31' 09"

== Stage 12 ==
12 July 1942 - Reinosa to Gijón, 199 km (123.7 mi)

Stage 12 result

Rank	Rider	Time
1	Delio Rodríguez (ESP)	8h 01' 46"
2	Louis Thiétard (FRA)	s.t.
3	Celestino Camilla (ITA)	s.t.
4	Joaquín Olmos (ESP)	s.t.
5	Lucien Lauk (FRA)	s.t.
6	José Botanch (ESP)	s.t.
7	Fermo Camellini (ITA)	s.t.

General classification after Stage 12

Rank	Rider	Time
1	Julián Berrendero (ESP)	83h 24' 07"
2	Diego Chafer (ESP)	+ 11' 57"
3	Antonio Andres Sancho (ESP)	+ 12' 36"
4	Cipriano Elys (ESP)	+ 12' 37"
5	Juan Gimeno (ESP)	+ 24' 37"
6	José Jabardo (ESP)	+ 25' 14"
7	Vicente Miró (ESP)	+ 27' 28"
8	Fermo Camellini (ITA)	+ 27' 39"
9	Isidro Bejarano (ESP)	+ 28' 31"
10	Delio Rodríguez (ESP)	+ 31' 09"

== Stage 13 ==
13 July 1942 - Gijón to Oviedo, 75 km (47 mi)

Stage 13 result

Rank	Rider	Time
1	Louis Thiétard (FRA)	2h 25' 57"
2	Celestino Camilla (ITA)	+ 6' 32"
3	Joaquín Olmos (ESP)	s.t.
4	José Jabardo (ESP)	s.t.
5	Fermo Camellini (ITA)	s.t.
6	Pierre Brambilla (ITA)	s.t.
7	René Vietto (FRA)	s.t.
8	Diego Chafer (ESP)	s.t.
9	Juan Gimeno (ESP)	s.t.
10	Julián Berrendero (ESP)	s.t.

== Stage 14 ==
14 July 1942 - Oviedo to Luarca, 129 km (80 mi)

Stage 14 result

Rank	Rider	Time
1	Delio Rodríguez (ESP)	4h 32' 10"
2	Louis Thiétard (FRA)	s.t.
3	Antonio Destrieux (ESP)	s.t.
4	Celestino Camilla (ITA)	s.t.
5	René Vietto (FRA)	s.t.
6	José Jabardo (ESP)	s.t.
7	Fermo Camellini (ITA)	s.t.
8	Pierre Brambilla (ITA)	s.t.
9	Antonio Andres Sancho (ESP)	s.t.
10	Diego Chafer (ESP)	s.t.

General classification after Stage 14

Rank	Rider	Time
1	Julián Berrendero (ESP)	90h 28' 46"
2	Diego Chafer (ESP)	+ 11' 57"
3	Antonio Andres Sancho (ESP)	+ 12' 36"
4	Cipriano Elys (ESP)	+ 22' 37"
5	Juan Gimeno (ESP)	+ 24' 37"
6	José Jabardo (ESP)	+ 25' 14"
7	Fermo Camellini (ITA)	+ 27' 39"
8	Isidro Bejarano (ESP)	+ 28' 42"
9	Delio Rodríguez (ESP)	+ 31' 07"
10	Vicente Miró (ESP)	+ 37' 37"

== Stage 15 ==
15 July 1942 - Luarca to A Coruña, 219 km (136 mi)

Stage 15 result

Rank	Rider	Time
1	Louis Thiétard (FRA)	8h 00' 27"
2	Delio Rodríguez (ESP)	s.t.
3	Pierre Brambilla (ITA)	s.t.
4	Lucien Lauk (FRA)	s.t.
5	Fermo Camellini (ITA)	s.t.
6	Cipriano Elys (ESP)	s.t.
7	Celestino Camilla (ITA)	s.t.
8	Diego Chafer (ESP)	s.t.
9	Antonio Andres Sancho (ESP)	s.t.
10	Joaquín Olmos (ESP)	s.t.

General classification after Stage 15

Rank	Rider	Time
1	Julián Berrendero (ESP)	98h 30' 10"
2	Diego Chafer (ESP)	+ 11' 00"
3	Antonio Andres Sancho (ESP)	+ 11' 39"
4	Cipriano Elys (ESP)	+ 21' 40"
5	Juan Gimeno (ESP)	+ 23' 40"
6	José Jabardo (ESP)	+ 26' 42"
7	Fermo Camellini (ITA)	
8	Isidro Bejarano (ESP)	+ 27' 45"
9	Delio Rodríguez (ESP)	+ 30' 12"
10	Vicente Miró (ESP)	+ 36' 40"

== Stage 16a ==
16 July 1942 - A Coruña to Santiago de Compostela, 63 km (39 mi) (ITT)

Stage 16a result

Rank	Rider	Time
1	Antonio Andres Sancho (ESP)	1h 47' 04"
2	José Botanch (ESP)	s.t.
3	Diego Chafer (ESP)	s.t.
4	Juan Gimeno (ESP)	+ 2' 16"
5	Delio Rodríguez (ESP)	+ 2' 22"
6	Cipriano Elys (ESP)	s.t.
7	Julián Berrendero (ESP)	s.t.
8	José Jabardo (ESP)	s.t.
9	Alberto Carrasco (ESP)	s.t.
10	Isidro Bejarano (ESP)	+ 3' 27"

== Stage 16b ==
16 July 1942 - Santiago de Compostela to Vigo, 110 km (68 mi)

Stage 16b result

Rank	Rider	Time
1	René Vietto (FRA)	3h 58' 01"
2	Juan Gimeno (ESP)	+ 35"
3	Joaquín Olmos (ESP)	+ 10' 50"
4	Julián Berrendero (ESP)	s.t.
5	José Jabardo (ESP)	s.t.
6	Celestino Camilla (ITA)	s.t.
7	Louis Thiétard (FRA)	s.t.
8	Pierre Brambilla (ITA)	s.t.
9	Lucien Lauk (FRA)	s.t.
10	Antonio Andres Sancho (ESP)	s.t.

General classification after Stage 16b

Rank	Rider	Time
1	Julián Berrendero (ESP)	104h 28' 27"
2	Diego Chafer (ESP)	+ 8' 38"
3	Antonio Andres Sancho (ESP)	+ 9' 17"
4	Juan Gimeno (ESP)	+ 12' 49"
5	Cipriano Elys (ESP)	+ 21' 40"
6	José Jabardo (ESP)	+ 25' 14"
7	Isidro Bejarano (ESP)	+ 28' 50"
8	Delio Rodríguez (ESP)	+ 30' 26"
9	José Botanch (ESP)	+ 35' 32"
10	Vicente Miró (ESP)	+ 53' 15"

== Stage 17 ==
17 July 1942 - Vigo to Ponferrada, 270 km (170 mi)

Stage 17 result

Rank	Rider	Time
1	Joaquín Olmos (ESP)	11h 17' 06"
2	Delio Rodríguez (ESP)	s.t.
3	Celestino Camilla (ITA)	s.t.
4	Louis Thiétard (FRA)	s.t.
5	Fermo Camellini (ITA)	s.t.
6	Pierre Brambilla (ITA)	s.t.
7	René Vietto (FRA)	s.t.
8	Lucien Lauk (FRA)	s.t.
9	Antonio Andres Sancho (ESP)	s.t.
10	Diego Chafer (ESP)	s.t.

General classification after Stage 17

Rank	Rider	Time
1	Julián Berrendero (ESP)	
2	Diego Chafer (ESP)	+ 8' 38"
3	Antonio Andres Sancho (ESP)	+ 9' 17"
4	Juan Gimeno (ESP)	+ 12' 49"
5	Cipriano Elys (ESP)	+ 21' 40"
6	José Jabardo (ESP)	+ 25' 14"
7	Isidro Bejarano (ESP)	+ 28' 50"
8	Delio Rodríguez (ESP)	+ 30' 26"
9	José Botanch (ESP)	+ 35' 32"
10	Vicente Miró (ESP)	+ 53' 15"

== Stage 18 ==
18 July 1942 - Ponferrada to Salamanca, 251 km (156 mi)

Stage 18 result

Rank	Rider	Time
1	Celestino Camilla (ITA)	9h 15' 05"
2	Louis Thiétard (FRA)	+ 5"
3	Joaquín Olmos (ESP)	s.t.
4	Pierre Brambilla (ITA)	s.t.
5	Fermo Camellini (ITA)	s.t.
6	José Botanch (ESP)	s.t.
7	José Jabardo (ESP)	s.t.
8	Julián Berrendero (ESP)	s.t.
9	René Vietto (FRA)	s.t.
10	Antonio Andres Sancho (ESP)	s.t.

General classification after Stage 18

Rank	Rider	Time
1	Julián Berrendero (ESP)	125h 00' 53"
2	Diego Chafer (ESP)	+ 8' 38"
3	Antonio Andres Sancho (ESP)	+ 9' 17"
4	Juan Gimeno (ESP)	+ 13' 39"
5	Cipriano Elys (ESP)	+ 21' 40"
6	José Jabardo (ESP)	+ 25' 14"
7	Isidro Bejarano (ESP)	+ 28' 50"
8	Delio Rodríguez (ESP)	+ 30' 26"
9	José Botanch (ESP)	+ 35' 32"
10	Vicente Miró (ESP)	+ 57' 33"

== Stage 19 ==
19 July 1942 - Salamanca to Madrid, 248 km (154 mi)

Stage 19 result

Rank	Rider	Time
1	Celestino Camilla (ITA)	9h 04' 10"
2	Julián Berrendero (ESP)	s.t.
3	Diego Chafer (ESP)	s.t.
4	Louis Thiétard (FRA)	+ 1' 50"
5	Cipriano Elys (ESP)	s.t.
6	Alberto Carrasco (ESP)	s.t.
7	Fermo Camellini (ITA)	+ 2' 35"
8	José Botanch (ESP)	s.t.
9	Juan Gimeno (ESP)	s.t.
10	José Jabardo (ESP)	s.t.

General classification after Stage 19

Rank	Rider	Time
1	Julián Berrendero (ESP)	134h 05' 09"
2	Diego Chafer (ESP)	+ 8' 38"
3	Antonio Andres Sancho (ESP)	+ 13' 12"
4	Juan Gimeno (ESP)	+ 16' 08"
5	Cipriano Elys (ESP)	+ 25' 30"
6	José Jabardo (ESP)	+ 27' 43"
7	Delio Rodríguez (ESP)	+ 33' 01"
8	Isidro Bejarano (ESP)	+ 35' 10"
9	José Botanch (ESP)	+ 38' 01"
10	Fermo Camellini (ITA)	+ 58' 11"
