= 1946 Vuelta a España, Stage 13 to Stage 23 =

Long-distance bicycle race stages

The 1946 Vuelta a España was the 6th edition of Vuelta a España, one of cycling's Grand Tours. The Tour began in Madrid on 7 May and Stage 13 occurred on 19 May with a stage from Barcelona. The race finished in Madrid on 30 May.

== Stage 13 ==
19 May 1946 - Barcelona to Lleida, 162 km (100.7 mi)

Stage 13 result

Rank	Rider	Time
1	Delio Rodríguez (ESP)	5h 45' 28"
2	Miguel Gual (ESP)	s.t.
3	Dalmacio Langarica (ESP)	s.t.
4	Antonio Martín (ESP)	s.t.
5	João Lourenço (POR)	s.t.
6	John Lambrichts (NED)	s.t.
7	Hubert Sijen (NED)	s.t.
8	João Rebelo (POR)	s.t.
9	Cees van de Voorde (NED)	s.t.
10	Frans Pauwels (NED)	s.t.

General classification after Stage 13

Rank	Rider	Time
1	Manuel Costa (ESP)	71h 04' 05"
2	Dalmacio Langarica (ESP)	+ 15' 39"
3	John Lambrichts (NED)	+ 30' 13"
4	Julián Berrendero (ESP)	+ 33' 01"
5	Alejandro Fombellida (ESP)	+ 36' 00"
6	Delio Rodríguez (ESP)	+ 43' 29"
7	Antonio Andrés Sancho (ESP)	+ 49' 41"
8	Kurt Zaugg (SUI)	+ 1h 01' 52"
9	Cees van de Voorde (NED)	+ 1h 03' 31"
10	Emilio Rodríguez (ESP)	+ 1h 05' 26"

== Stage 14 ==
20 May 1946 - Lleida to Zaragoza, 144 km (89 mi)

== Stage 15 ==
21 May 1946 - Zaragoza to San Sebastián, 276 km (171 mi)

Stage 15 result

Rank	Rider	Time
1	Delio Rodríguez (ESP)	11h 14' 28"
2	Dalmacio Langarica (ESP)	s.t.
3	Cipriano Aguirrezabal (ESP)	s.t.
4	Miguel Gual (ESP)	s.t.
5	Cees van de Voorde (NED)	s.t.
6	Jorge Pereira (POR)	s.t.
7	Aristides Martins (POR)	s.t.
8	John Lambrichts (NED)	s.t.
9	Hubert Sijen (NED)	s.t.
10	Frans Pauwels (NED)	s.t.

General classification after Stage 15

Rank	Rider	Time
1	Manuel Costa (ESP)	87h 42' 18"
2	Dalmacio Langarica (ESP)	+ 16' 09"
3	John Lambrichts (NED)	+ 30' 43"
4	Julián Berrendero (ESP)	+ 33' 01"
5	Alejandro Fombellida (ESP)	+ 36' 30"
6	Delio Rodríguez (ESP)	+ 43' 59"
7	Antonio Andrés Sancho (ESP)	+ 50' 11"
8	Kurt Zaugg (SUI)	+ 1h 02' 22"
9	Cees van de Voorde (NED)	+ 1h 04' 01"
10	Emilio Rodríguez (ESP)	+ 1h 05' 56"

== Stage 16 ==
23 May 1946 - San Sebastián to Bilbao, 207 km (129 mi)

Stage 16 result

Rank	Rider	Time
1	Dalmacio Langarica (ESP)	7h 25' 31"
2	Emilio Rodríguez (ESP)	s.t.
3	Georges Aeschlimann (SUI)	+ 4"
4	João Rebelo (POR)	+ 56"
5	Delio Rodríguez (ESP)	+ 2' 36"
6	Julián Berrendero (ESP)	s.t.
7	José Gutiérrez (ESP)	s.t.
8	Cipriano Aguirrezabal (ESP)	+ 3' 59"
9	John Lambrichts (NED)	s.t.
10	Ernest Kuhn (SUI)	s.t.

General classification after Stage 16

Rank	Rider	Time
1	Manuel Costa (ESP)	95h 22' 18"
2	Dalmacio Langarica (ESP)	+ 1' 38"
3	John Lambrichts (NED)	+ 20' 13"
4	Julián Berrendero (ESP)	+ 21' 38"
5	Delio Rodríguez (ESP)	+ 32' 06"
6	Alejandro Fombellida (ESP)	+ 36' 10"
7	Antonio Andrés Sancho (ESP)	+ 39' 41"
8	Emilio Rodríguez (ESP)	+ 51' 27"
9	Georges Aeschlimann (SUI)	+ 55' 47"
10	José Gutiérrez (ESP)	+ 58' 51"

== Stage 17 ==
24 May 1946 - Bilbao to Santander, 226 km (140 mi)

Stage 17 result

Rank	Rider	Time
1	Delio Rodríguez (ESP)	9h 00' 15"
2	Julián Berrendero (ESP)	s.t.
3	Dalmacio Langarica (ESP)	s.t.
4	Manuel Costa (ESP)	s.t.
5	Pastor Rodríguez (ESP)	s.t.
6	João Rebelo (POR)	s.t.
7	John Lambrichts (NED)	s.t.
8	Antonio Andrés Sancho (ESP)	s.t.
9	Joaquín Olmos (ESP)	s.t.
10	Bernardo Ruiz (ESP)	s.t.

General classification after Stage 17

Rank	Rider	Time
1	Manuel Costa (ESP)	104h 22' 33"
2	Dalmacio Langarica (ESP)	+ 1' 40"
3	John Lambrichts (NED)	+ 20' 13"
4	Julián Berrendero (ESP)	+ 21' 38"
5	Delio Rodríguez (ESP)	+ 32' 06"
6	Antonio Andrés Sancho (ESP)	+ 39' 41"
7	Alejandro Fombellida (ESP)	+ 39' 42"
8	Emilio Rodríguez (ESP)	+ 1h 01' 27"
9	José Gutiérrez (ESP)	+ 1h 02' 33"
10	Georges Aeschlimann (SUI)	+ 1h 10' 05"

== Stage 18 ==
25 May 1946 - Santander to Reinosa, 110 km (68 mi)

Stage 18 result

Rank	Rider	Time
1	Dalmacio Langarica (ESP)	5h 20' 26"
2	John Lambrichts (NED)	s.t.
3	Ernest Kuhn (SUI)	s.t.
4	Emilio Rodríguez (ESP)	+ 1' 12"
5	José Gutiérrez (ESP)	+ 3' 40"
6	Bernardo Ruiz (ESP)	s.t.
7	Manuel Costa (ESP)	+ 4' 09"
8	Alejandro Fombellida (ESP)	+ 4' 28"
9	Julián Berrendero (ESP)	+ 4' 39"
10	João Rebelo (POR)	+ 4' 46"

General classification after Stage 18

Rank	Rider	Time
1	Dalmacio Langarica (ESP)	109h 44' 39"
2	Manuel Costa (ESP)	+ 2' 49"
3	John Lambrichts (NED)	+ 18' 33"
4	Julián Berrendero (ESP)	+ 24' 37"
5	Delio Rodríguez (ESP)	+ 36' 56"
6	Alejandro Fombellida (ESP)	+ 42' 30"
7	Antonio Andrés Sancho (ESP)	+ 48' 56"
8	Emilio Rodríguez (ESP)	+ 50' 51"
9	José Gutiérrez (ESP)	+ 1h 04' 43"
10	Georges Aeschlimann (SUI)	+ 1h 24' 12"

== Stage 19 ==
26 May 1946 - Reinosa to Gijón, 204 km (127 mi)

Stage 19 result

Rank	Rider	Time
1	Delio Rodríguez (ESP)	8h 06' 02"
2	João Lourenço (POR)	s.t.
3	Dalmacio Langarica (ESP)	s.t.
4	Alejandro Fombellida (ESP)	s.t.
5	Cipriano Aguirrezabal (ESP)	s.t.
6	João Rebelo (POR)	s.t.
7	John Lambrichts (NED)	s.t.
8	Frans Pauwels (NED)	s.t.
9	Cees Joosen (NED)	s.t.
10	Georges Aeschlimann (SUI)	s.t.

General classification after Stage 19

Rank	Rider	Time
1	Dalmacio Langarica (ESP)	117h 50' 41"
2	Manuel Costa (ESP)	+ 2' 29"
3	John Lambrichts (NED)	+ 18' 33"
4	Julián Berrendero (ESP)	+ 24' 35"
5	Delio Rodríguez (ESP)	+ 36' 56"
6	Alejandro Fombellida (ESP)	+ 42' 30"
7	Antonio Andrés Sancho (ESP)	+ 48' 56"
8	Emilio Rodríguez (ESP)	+ 50' 59"
9	José Gutiérrez (ESP)	+ 1h 04' 43"
10	Georges Aeschlimann (SUI)	+ 1h 18' 12"

== Stage 20 ==
28 May 1946 - Gijón to Oviedo, 53 km (33 mi) (ITT)

Stage 20 result

Rank	Rider	Time
1	Dalmacio Langarica (ESP)	1h 44' 54"
2	Julián Berrendero (ESP)	+ 3"
3	John Lambrichts (NED)	+ 2' 21"
4	Cipriano Aguirrezabal (ESP)	+ 2' 49"
5	Ernest Kuhn (SUI)	+ 3' 01"
6	Alejandro Fombellida (ESP)	+ 3' 39"
7	João Rebelo (POR)	+ 5' 07"
8	Delio Rodríguez (ESP)	+ 5' 40"
9	Antonio Andrés Sancho (ESP)	+ 6' 24"
10	José Gutiérrez (ESP)	+ 7' 28"

== Stage 21 ==
28 May 1946 - Oviedo to León, 119 km (74 mi)

Stage 21 result

Rank	Rider	Time
1	Julián Berrendero (ESP)	5h 01' 25"
2	Alejandro Fombellida (ESP)	s.t.
3	Dalmacio Langarica (ESP)	s.t.
4	John Lambrichts (NED)	s.t.
5	Emilio Rodríguez (ESP)	s.t.
6	Manuel Costa (ESP)	s.t.
7	Cipriano Aguirrezabal (ESP)	s.t.
8	Ernest Kuhn (SUI)	s.t.
9	João Rebelo (POR)	+ 42"
10	José Gutiérrez (ESP)	+ 2' 28"

General classification after Stage 21

Rank	Rider	Time
1	Dalmacio Langarica (ESP)	124h 37' 00"
2	Manuel Costa (ESP)	+ 10' 21"
3	John Lambrichts (NED)	+ 20' 54"
4	Julián Berrendero (ESP)	+ 28' 40"
5	Delio Rodríguez (ESP)	+ 45' 04"
6	Alejandro Fombellida (ESP)	+ 46' 09"
7	Emilio Rodríguez (ESP)	+ 1h 00' 08"
8	Antonio Andrés Sancho (ESP)	+ 1h 00' 10"
9	José Gutiérrez (ESP)	+ 1h 14' 39"
10	Antonio Martín (ESP)	+ 1h 46' 13"

== Stage 22 ==
29 May 1946 - León to Valladolid, 134 km (83 mi)

Stage 22 result

Rank	Rider	Time
1	Alejandro Fombellida (ESP)	4h 21' 37"
2	John Lambrichts (NED)	s.t.
3	Delio Rodríguez (ESP)	s.t.
4	Cipriano Aguirrezabal (ESP)	s.t.
5	Julián Berrendero (ESP)	s.t.
6	Antonio Andrés Sancho (ESP)	s.t.
7	Dalmacio Langarica (ESP)	s.t.
8	João Rebelo (POR)	s.t.
9	João Lourenço (POR)	s.t.
10	Emilio Rodríguez (ESP)	+ 3' 37"

General classification after Stage 22

Rank	Rider	Time
1	Dalmacio Langarica (ESP)	128h 58' 37"
2	John Lambrichts (NED)	+ 23' 54"
3	Manuel Costa (ESP)	+ 24' 19"
4	Julián Berrendero (ESP)	+ 24' 40"
5	Delio Rodríguez (ESP)	+ 45' 04"
6	Alejandro Fombellida (ESP)	+ 46' 09"
7	Antonio Andrés Sancho (ESP)	+ 1h 00' 10"
8	Emilio Rodríguez (ESP)	+ 1h 03' 45"
9	José Gutiérrez (ESP)	+ 1h 18' 16"
10	João Rebelo (POR)	+ 1h 46' 50"

== Stage 23 ==
30 May 1946 - Valladolid to Madrid, 200 km (120 mi)

Stage 23 result

Rank	Rider	Time
1	Julián Berrendero (ESP)	8h 04' 53"
2	Delio Rodríguez (ESP)	+ 7' 08"
3	Alejandro Fombellida (ESP)	s.t.
4	John Lambrichts (NED)	s.t.
5	Cipriano Aguirrezabal (ESP)	s.t.
6	Manuel Costa (ESP)	s.t.
7	Antonio Martín (ESP)	s.t.
8	Georges Aeschlimann (SUI)	s.t.
9	Dalmacio Langarica (ESP)	s.t.
10	Antonio Andrés Sancho (ESP)	s.t.

General classification after Stage 23

Rank	Rider	Time
1	Dalmacio Langarica (ESP)	137h 10' 38"
2	Julián Berrendero (ESP)	+ 17' 32"
3	John Lambrichts (NED)	+ 23' 54"
4	Manuel Costa (ESP)	+ 24' 19"
5	Delio Rodríguez (ESP)	+ 45' 04"
6	Alejandro Fombellida (ESP)	+ 46' 09"
7	Antonio Andrés Sancho (ESP)	+ 1h 00' 10"
8	Emilio Rodríguez (ESP)	+ 1h 13' 45"
9	José Gutiérrez (ESP)	+ 1h 18' 48"
10	João Rebelo (POR)	+ 1h 53' 37"
