= 1945 Vuelta a España, Stage 10 to Stage 18 =

Long-distance bicycle race stages

The 1945 Vuelta a España was the 5th edition of Vuelta a España, one of cycling's Grand Tours. The Tour began in Madrid on 10 May and Stage 10 occurred on 21 May with a stage from Barcelona. The race finished in Madrid on 31 May.

== Stage 10 ==
21 May 1945 - Barcelona to Zaragoza, 306 km (190.1 mi)

Stage 10 result

Rank	Rider	Time
1	Miguel Gual (ESP)	13h 07' 44"
2	Bernardo Capó (ESP)	+ 55"
3	Juan Gimeno (ESP)	+ 2' 55"
4	Alejandro Fombellida (ESP)	s.t.
5	Vicente Miró (ESP)	s.t.
6	Antonio Martín (ESP)	s.t.
7	Julián Berrendero (ESP)	s.t.
8	João Rebelo (POR)	s.t.
9	Júlio Mourão (POR)	s.t.
10	Joaquín Jiménez (ESP)	s.t.

== Stage 11 ==
22 May 1945 - Zaragoza to San Sebastián, 276 km (171.5 mi)

Stage 11 result

Rank	Rider	Time
1	José Gutiérrez (ESP)	10h 06' 30"
2	Alejandro Fombellida (ESP)	+ 27"
3	João Rebelo (POR)	s.t.
4	Julián Berrendero (ESP)	s.t.
5	Aniceto Bruno (POR)	s.t.
6	Dalmacio Langarica (ESP)	s.t.
7	Miguel Gual (ESP)	s.t.
8	Delio Rodríguez (ESP)	+ 36"
9	Diego Chafer (ESP)	+ 1' 08"
10	Antonio Martín (ESP)	s.t.

General classification after Stage 11

Rank	Rider	Time
1	Delio Rodríguez (ESP)	92h 39' 57"
2	Juan Gimeno (ESP)	+ 34' 19"
3	Miguel Gual (ESP)	+ 39' 14"
4	Julián Berrendero (ESP)	+ 39' 49"
5	Bernardo Capó (ESP)	+ 46' 30"
6	Alejandro Fombellida (ESP)	+ 59' 40"
7	Manuel Costa (ESP)	+ 1h 03' 15"
8	Antonio Martín (ESP)	+ 1h 07' 57"
9	Diego Chafer (ESP)	+ 1h 09' 57"
10	Joaquín Olmos (ESP)	+ 1h 13' 17"

== Stage 12 ==
24 June 1945 - San Sebastián to Bilbao, 207 km (128.6 mi)

Stage 12 result

Rank	Rider	Time
1	João Rebelo (POR)	7h 12' 45"
2	Aniceto Bruno (POR)	+ 11' 36"
3	Julián Berrendero (ESP)	+ 11' 59"
4	Delio Rodríguez (ESP)	+ 13' 48"
5	Dalmacio Langarica (ESP)	s.t.
6	Diego Chafer (ESP)	s.t.
7	Miguel Gual (ESP)	s.t.
8	Juan Gimeno (ESP)	s.t.
9	Manuel Costa (ESP)	s.t.
10	Pedro Font (ESP)	+ 14' 00"

General classification after Stage 12

Rank	Rider	Time
1	Delio Rodríguez (ESP)	100h 06' 30"
2	Juan Gimeno (ESP)	+ 34' 19"
3	Julián Berrendero (ESP)	+ 38' 00"
4	Miguel Gual (ESP)	+ 38' 14"
5	Alejandro Fombellida (ESP)	+ 1h 01' 52"
6	Manuel Costa (ESP)	+ 1h 03' 15"
7	Bernardo Capó (ESP)	+ 1h 03' 27"
8	Antonio Martín (ESP)	+ 1h 05' 13"
9	Diego Chafer (ESP)	+ 1h 08' 02"
10	Pedro Font (ESP)	+ 1h 15' 01"

== Stage 13 ==
25 May 1945 - Bilbao to Santander, 188 km (117 mi)

Stage 13 result

Rank	Rider	Time
1	Delio Rodríguez (ESP)	8h 07' 50"
2	Joaquín Olmos (ESP)	+ 1' 00"
3	Dalmacio Langarica (ESP)	s.t.
4	Bernardo Capó (ESP)	s.t.
5	Julián Berrendero (ESP)	s.t.
6	Antonio Martín (ESP)	s.t.
7	Juan Gimeno (ESP)	s.t.
8	Manuel Costa (ESP)	s.t.
9	João Rebelo (POR)	+ 20"
10	Miguel Gual (ESP)	+ 3' 46"

General classification after Stage 13

Rank	Rider	Time
1	Delio Rodríguez (ESP)	108h 14' 20"
2	Juan Gimeno (ESP)	+ 35' 19"
3	Julián Berrendero (ESP)	+ 37' 42"
4	Miguel Gual (ESP)	+ 42' 00"
5	Manuel Costa (ESP)	+ 1h 04' 13"
6	Bernardo Capó (ESP)	+ 1h 04' 27"
7	Antonio Martín (ESP)	+ 1h 06' 13"
8	Alejandro Fombellida (ESP)	+ 1h 06' 38"
9	Diego Chafer (ESP)	+ 1h 12' 48"
10	Joaquín Olmos (ESP)	+ 1h 16' 29"

== Stage 14 ==
26 May 1945 - Santander to Reinosa, 110 km (68 mi)

Stage 14 result

Rank	Rider	Time
1	João Rebelo (POR)	4h 17' 00"
2	Pedro Font (ESP)	+ 5' 50"
3	Julián Berrendero (ESP)	+ 8' 33"
4	José Gutiérrez (ESP)	+ 9' 12"
5	Antonio Martín (ESP)	+ 10' 02"
6	Bernardo Capó (ESP)	s.t.
7	Juan Gimeno (ESP)	+ 10' 07"
8	Diego Chafer (ESP)	s.t.
9	Joaquín Olmos (ESP)	+ 12' 14"
10	Delio Rodríguez (ESP)	s.t.

General classification after Stage 14

Rank	Rider	Time
1	Delio Rodríguez (ESP)	112h 43' 34"
2	Juan Gimeno (ESP)	+ 33' 12"
3	Julián Berrendero (ESP)	+ 34' 03"
4	Miguel Gual (ESP)	+ 45' 00"
5	Bernardo Capó (ESP)	+ 1h 04' 14"
6	Antonio Martín (ESP)	+ 1h 07' 01"
7	João Rebelo (POR)	+ 1h 06' 31"
8	Diego Chafer (ESP)	+ 1h 10' 41"
9	Alejandro Fombellida (ESP)	+ 1h 11' 46"
10	Pedro Font (ESP)	+ 1h 13' 23"

== Stage 15 ==
27 May 1945 - Reinosa to Gijón, 200 km (120 mi)

Stage 15 result

Rank	Rider	Time
1	Delio Rodríguez (ESP)	6h 50' 43"
2	Julián Berrendero (ESP)	+ 1' 00"
3	Antonio Martín (ESP)	s.t.
4	Pedro Font (ESP)	s.t.
5	Joaquín Olmos (ESP)	s.t.
6	João Rebelo (POR)	s.t.
7	Juan Gimeno (ESP)	s.t.
8	Diego Chafer (ESP)	s.t.
9	Pastor Rodríguez (ESP)	s.t.
10	Manuel Costa (ESP)	s.t.

General classification after Stage 15

Rank	Rider	Time
1	Delio Rodríguez (ESP)	119h 34' 17"
2	Juan Gimeno (ESP)	+ 34' 12"
3	Julián Berrendero (ESP)	+ 34' 53"
4	Miguel Gual (ESP)	+ 48' 53"
5	Antonio Martín (ESP)	+ 1h 08' 01"
6	João Rebelo (POR)	+ 1h 08' 31"
7	Diego Chafer (ESP)	+ 1h 11' 39"
8	Pedro Font (ESP)	+ 1h 14' 23"
9	Joaquín Olmos (ESP)	+ 1h 15' 29"
10	Bernardo Capó (ESP)	+ 1h 16' 20"

== Stage 16 ==
29 May 1945 - Gijón to León, 172 km (107 mi)

Stage 16 result

Rank	Rider	Time
1	Julián Berrendero (ESP)	5h 31' 29"
2	João Rebelo (POR)	+ 2' 15"
3	José Gutiérrez (ESP)	s.t.
4	Alejandro Fombellida (ESP)	+ 4' 52"
5	Miguel Gual (ESP)	s.t.
6	Pastor Rodríguez (ESP)	s.t.
7	Delio Rodríguez (ESP)	s.t.
8	Diego Chafer (ESP)	s.t.
9	Antonio Martín (ESP)	s.t.
10	Bernardo Capó (ESP)	s.t.

General classification after Stage 16

Rank	Rider	Time
1	Delio Rodríguez (ESP)	125h 10' 38"
2	Julián Berrendero (ESP)	+ 30' 11"
3	Juan Gimeno (ESP)	+ 34' 12"
4	Miguel Gual (ESP)	+ 1h 05' 54"
5	João Rebelo (POR)	s.t.
6	Antonio Martín (ESP)	+ 1h 08' 01"
7	Diego Chafer (ESP)	+ 1h 11' 41"
8	Bernardo Capó (ESP)	+ 1h 26' 20"
9	Alejandro Fombellida (ESP)	+ 1h 17' 18"
10	Pedro Font (ESP)	+ 1h 19' 21"

== Stage 17 ==
30 May 1945 - León to Valladolid, 132 km (82 mi)

Stage 17 result

Rank	Rider	Time
1	Delio Rodríguez (ESP)	3h 42' 44"
2	Joaquín Olmos (ESP)	+ 1' 00"
3	Miguel Gual (ESP)	s.t.
4	Alejandro Fombellida (ESP)	s.t.
5	Antonio Martín (ESP)	s.t.
6	Antonio Andrés Sancho (ESP)	s.t.
7	Julián Berrendero (ESP)	s.t.
8	Pedro Font (ESP)	s.t.
9	Joaquín Jiménez (ESP)	s.t.
10	José Lizarralde (ESP)	s.t.

General classification after Stage 17

Rank	Rider	Time
1	Delio Rodríguez (ESP)	128h 53' 22"
2	Julián Berrendero (ESP)	+ 31' 11"
3	Juan Gimeno (ESP)	+ 37' 18"
4	Miguel Gual (ESP)	+ 49' 53"
5	Antonio Martín (ESP)	+ 1h 09' 01"
6	João Rebelo (POR)	+ 1h 09' 09"
7	Diego Chafer (ESP)	+ 1h 12' 41"
8	Bernardo Capó (ESP)	+ 1h 17' 20"
9	Alejandro Fombellida (ESP)	+ 1h 18' 18"
10	Pedro Font (ESP)	+ 1h 20' 21"

== Stage 18 ==
31 May 1945 - Valladolid to Madrid, 185 km (115 mi)

Stage 18 result

Rank	Rider	Time
1	Joaquín Olmos (ESP)	6h 49' 33"
2	Alejandro Fombellida (ESP)	+ 1' 00"
3	Julián Berrendero (ESP)	s.t.
4	Pedro Font (ESP)	s.t.
5	Antonio Martín (ESP)	s.t.
6	Pastor Rodríguez (ESP)	s.t.
7	Miguel Gual (ESP)	s.t.
8	Delio Rodríguez (ESP)	s.t.
9	Joaquín Jiménez (ESP)	s.t.
10	Juan Gimeno (ESP)	s.t.

General classification after Stage 18

Rank	Rider	Time
1	Delio Rodríguez (ESP)	135h 43' 55"
2	Julián Berrendero (ESP)	+ 30' 08"
3	Juan Gimeno (ESP)	+ 37' 18"
4	Miguel Gual (ESP)	+ 49' 53"
5	Antonio Martín (ESP)	+ 1h 09' 01"
6	João Rebelo (POR)	+ 1h 09' 09"
7	Diego Chafer (ESP)	+ 1h 12' 41"
8	Bernardo Capó (ESP)	+ 1h 17' 20"
9	Alejandro Fombellida (ESP)	+ 1h 18' 18"
10	Pedro Font (ESP)	+ 1h 20' 21"
