= Charles Guyot =

Charles Guyot may refer to:

- Géo-Charles (born Charles Louis Proper Guyot; 1892–1963), French poet and gold medallist at the 1924 Summer Olympics
- Charles Guyot (cyclist, born 1890) (1890–1958), Swiss cyclist
- Charles Guyot (cyclist, born 1925) (1925–1973), Swiss cyclist
