= 1942 Vuelta a España =

Race details
- Dates: 30 June – 19 July
- Stages: 19
- Distance: 3,683 km (2,289 mi)
- Winning time: 134h 05' 09"

Results
Jersey awarded to the overall winner	Winner	Julián Berrendero (ESP)
	Second	Diego Cháfer (ESP)
	Third	Antonio Andres Sancho (ESP)
	Mountains	Julián Berrendero (ESP)

The 4th Vuelta a España (Tour of Spain), a long-distance bicycle stage race and one of the three grand tours, was held from 30 June to 19 July 1942. It consisted of 19 stages covering a total of 3,683 km (2,289 mi), and was won by Julián Berrendero. Berrendero also won the mountains classification.

== Route ==
List of stages
Stage	Date	Course	Distance	Type	Winner
1	30 June	Madrid to Albacete	245 km (152 mi)		Julián Berrendero (ESP)
2	1 July	Albacete to Murcia	160 km (99 mi)		Delio Rodríguez (ESP)
3	2 July	Murcia to Valencia	248 km (154 mi)		José Jabardo (ESP)
4	4 July	Valencia to Tarragona	278 km (173 mi)		Delio Rodríguez (ESP)
5	5 July	Tarragona to Barcelona	120 km (75 mi)		Delio Rodríguez (ESP)
6	6 July	Barcelona to Huesca	279 km (173 mi)		Delio Rodríguez (ESP)
7	7 July	Huesca to San Sebastián	305 km (190 mi)		Delio Rodríguez (ESP)
8	8 July	San Sebastián to Bilbao	160 km (99 mi)		René Vietto (FRA)
9	9 July	Bilbao to Castro Urdiales	53 km (33 mi)	Individual time trial	Delio Rodríguez (ESP)
10	10 July	Castro Urdiales to Santander	151 km (94 mi)		Julián Berrendero (ESP)
11	11 July	Santander to Reinosa	120 km (75 mi)		Pierre Brambilla (ITA)
12	12 July	Reinosa to Gijón	199 km (124 mi)		Delio Rodríguez (ESP)
13	13 July	Gijón to Oviedo	75 km (47 mi)		Louis Thiétard (FRA)
14	14 July	Oviedo to Luarca	129 km (80 mi)		Delio Rodríguez (ESP)
15	15 July	Luarca to A Coruña	219 km (136 mi)		Louis Thiétard (FRA)
16a	16 July	A Coruña to Santiago de Compostela	63 km (39 mi)	Individual time trial	Antonio Sancho (ESP)
16b	16 July	Santiago de Compostela to Vigo	110 km (68 mi)		René Vietto (FRA)
17	17 July	Vigo to Ponferrada	270 km (168 mi)		Joaquín Olmos (ESP)
18	18 July	Ponferrada to Salamanca	251 km (156 mi)		Celestino Camilla (ITA)
19	19 July	Salamanca to Madrid	248 km (154 mi)		Celestino Camilla (ITA)

== Results ==
=== Final General Classification ===
Rank	Rider	Team	Time
1	(Spain) Julián Berrendero		134h 05' 09"
2	(Spain) Diego Cháfer		+ 8' 38"
3	(Spain) Antonio Andres Sancho		+ 13' 12"
4	(Spain) Juan Gimeno		+ 16' 08"
5	(Spain) Cipriano Elys		+ 23' 30"
6	(Spain) José Jabardo		+ 27' 43"
7	(Spain) Delio Rodríguez		+ 34' 21"
8	(Spain) Isidro Bejarano		+ 35' 10"
9	(Spain) José Botanch		+ 38' 01"
10	(Italy) Fermo Camellini		+ 58' 20"
11	(Spain) Alberto Carrasco		
12	(Spain) Vicente Miro		
13	(Spain) Joaquim Olmos		
14	(France) René Vietto		
15	(France) Louis Thiétard		
16	(Italy) Celestino Camilla		
17	(Italy) Pierre Brambilla		
18	(Spain) Antonio Destrieux		
