= 1945 Vuelta a España =

Race details
- Dates: 10 – 31 May
- Stages: 18
- Distance: 3,818 km (2,372 mi)
- Winning time: 135h 43' 55"

Results
Jersey awarded to the overall winner	Winner	Delio Rodríguez (ESP)
	Second	Julián Berrendero (ESP)
	Third	Juan Gimeno (ESP)
	Points	Delio Rodríguez (ESP)
	Mountains	Julián Berrendero (ESP)

The 5th Vuelta a España (Tour of Spain), a long-distance bicycle stage race and one of the three grand tours, was held from 10 to 31 May 1945. It consisted of 18 stages covering a total of 3,818 km (2,372 mi), and was won by Delio Rodríguez. There was also a classification sponsored by Pirelli, Rodríguez also won the points classification and Julián Berrendero won the mountains classification.

== Route ==
List of stages
Stage	Date	Course	Distance	Type	Winner
1	10 May	Madrid to Salamanca	212 km (132 mi)		Julián Berrendero (ESP)
2	11 May	Salamanca to Cáceres	214 km (133 mi)		Delio Rodríguez (ESP)
3	12 May	Cáceres to Badajoz	132 km (82 mi)		Miguel Gual (ESP)
4a	13 May	Badajoz to Almendralejo	57 km (35 mi)	Individual time trial	Juan Gimeno (ESP)
4b	13 May	Almendralejo to Sevilla	171 km (106 mi)		Vicente Miró (ESP)
5	15 May	Sevilla to Granada	251 km (156 mi)		Antonio Montes (ESP)
6	16 May	Granada to Murcia	285 km (177 mi)		Joaquín Olmos (ESP)
7	17 May	Murcia to Valencia	244 km (152 mi)		Delio Rodríguez (ESP)
8	19 May	Valencia to Tortosa	188 km (117 mi)		Delio Rodríguez (ESP)
9	20 May	Tortosa to Barcelona	288 km (179 mi)		Miguel Gual (ESP)
10	21 May	Barcelona to Zaragoza	306 km (190 mi)		Miguel Gual (ESP)
11	22 May	Zaragoza to San Sebastián	276 km (171 mi)		José Gutierrez (ESP)
12	24 May	San Sebastián to Bilbao	207 km (129 mi)		João Rebelo (POR)
13	25 May	Bilbao to Santander	188 km (117 mi)		Delio Rodríguez (ESP)
14	26 May	Santander to Reinosa	110 km (68 mi)		João Rebelo (POR)
15	27 May	Reinosa to Gijón	200 km (124 mi)		Delio Rodríguez (ESP)
16	29 May	Gijón to León	172 km (107 mi)		Julián Berrendero (ESP)
17	30 May	León to Valladolid	132 km (82 mi)		Delio Rodríguez (ESP)
18	31 May	Valladolid to Madrid	185 km (115 mi)		Joaquín Olmos (ESP)

== Points classification ==
A new introduction to this Vuelta was a classification on points, sponsored by Pirelli. It was calculated as follows:

- The winner of a stage received 100 points, the second 99, and so on. If cyclists arrived in a group that was given the same time, they all received the same number of points.
- The first five cyclists in a stage received 12 points for every minute that they arrived ahead of the number six of the stage.
- For every point scored for the mountains classification, two points were given for this points classification.
- On intermediate sprints, points could be won: 8 for the winner, 6 for the second, 4 and 2 for the next.

Although the sponsor said that the classification was a great success, it did not return the next edition.

== Final standings ==
=== General classification ===
Final general classification (1–25)
Rank	Rider	Time
1	Delio Rodríguez (Spain)	135h 43' 55"
2	Julián Berrendero (Spain)	+ 30' 08"
3	Juan Gimeno (Spain)	+ 37' 18"
4	Miguel Gual (Spain)	+ 49' 53"
5	Antonio Martín (Spain)	+ 1h 09' 01"
6	João Rebelo (POR)	+ 1h 09' 09"
7	Diego Chafer (Spain)	+ 1h 12' 41"
8	Bernardo Capo (Spain)	+ 1h 17' 20"
9	Alejandro Fombellida (Spain)	+ 1h 18' 18"
10	Pedro Font (Spain)	+ 1h 20' 21"
11	Manuel Costa (Spain)	
12	Joaquim Olmos (Spain)	
13	José Gutierrez (Spain)	
14	Dalmacio Langarica (Spain)	
15	Pastor Rodríguez (Spain)	
16	Gabriel Palmer (Spain)	
17	Julio Mourao (POR)	
18	Miguel Casas (Spain)	
19	Antonio Andres Sancho (Spain)	
20	Vicente Miro (Spain)	
21	Joaquim Jiménez (Spain)	
22	Bernardo Ruiz (Spain)	
23	Aniceto Bruno (POR)	
24	Felix Vidaurreta (Spain)	
25	Imperio Dos Santos (POR)	

=== Mountain classification ===
Final mountain classification (1–15)
Rank	Rider	Points
1	Julián Berrendero (Spain)	45
2	João Rebelo (POR)	44
3	Pedro Font (Spain)	28
4	Miguel Gual (Spain)	22
5	José Gutierrez (Spain)	11
6	Miguel Casas (Spain)	8
7	Aniceto Bruno (POR)	7
8	Dalmacio Langarica (Spain)	6
9	Joaquim Olmos (Spain)	4
10	Alejandro Fombellida (Spain)	3
10	Juan Gimeno (Spain)	3
10	Joaquim Jiménez (Spain)	3
13	Diego Chafer (Spain)	2
14	Bernardo Capo (Spain)	1
14	Antonio Martín (Spain)	1

=== Points classification ===
Final points classification (1–10)
Rank	Rider	Points
1	Delio Rodríguez (Spain)	2347
2	João Rebelo (POR)	2021
3	Julián Berrendero (Spain)	1967
4	Miguel Gual (Spain)	1942
5	Juan Gimeno (Spain)	1895
6	Pedro Font (Spain)	1823
7	Vicente Miro (Spain)	1803
8	Bernardo Capo (Spain)	1799
9	José Gutierrez (Spain)	1747
10	Antonio Martín (Spain)	1730

=== Other awards ===
There was also a team competition: the ranks in the general classification of the best two cyclists per cycling club were added, and the club with the lowest total won. Delio Rodríguez was in the same club as Alejandro Fombellida, and because they finished first and ninth, they scored 10 points; no other team had fewer points, so they won the team competition.
