= 1948 Tour de Romandie =

Race details
- Dates: 6–9 June 1948
- Stages: 4
- Distance: 934 km (580 mi)
- Winning time: 28h 14' 14"

Results
	Winner	Ferdinand Kübler (SUI)
	Second	Jean Goldschmit (LUX)
	Third	Mathias Clemens (LUX)

The 1948 Tour de Romandie was the second edition of the Tour de Romandie cycle race and was held from 6 June to 9 June 1948. The race started and finished in Geneva. The race was won by Ferdinand Kübler.

== General classification ==
Final general classification
Rank	Rider	Time
1	Ferdinand Kübler (SUI)	28h 14' 14"
2	Jean Goldschmit (LUX)	+ 3' 57"
3	Mathias Clemens (LUX)	+ 6' 19"
4	Giulio Bresci (ITA)	+ 7' 43"
5	Jan Lambrichs (NED)	+ 9' 43"
6	Sjefke Janssen (NED)	+ 9' 56"
7	Emilio Croci-Torti (SUI)	+ 12' 38"
8	Charles Guyot (SUI)	+ 14' 15"
9	Aldo Baito (ITA)	+ 14' 44"
10	Georges Aeschlimann (SUI)	+ 15' 25"
