= Charles Guyot (cyclist, born 1925) =

Swiss cyclist

Personal information
- Born: 25 April 1925 Saint-Imier, Switzerland
- Died: 22 September 1973 (aged 48) Saint-Imier, Switzerland

Cycling career
- Sport: Cycling
- Role: Rider

Professional teams
- 1946-1947: Cilo
- 1948-1949: Tebag
- 1950-1952: Cilo

Major wins
- Züri-Metzgete 1947

Charles Guyot (French: [ʃaʁl ɡɥijo]; 25 April 1925 – 22 September 1973) was a Swiss racing cyclist. He raced as a professionnel from 1946 to 1952, winning the Züri-Metzgete in 1947 and a stage in the Tour de Suisse and the Giro del Ticino in 1949. His father Charles was also a professional racing cyclist.

== Major results ==
1948
8th Tour de Romandie

Sporting positions
Preceded by Gino Bartali	Winner of the Züri-Metzgete; 1947	Succeeded by Gino Bartali
