= 1946 Paris–Nice =

Race details
- Dates: 1–5 May 1946
- Stages: 5
- Distance: 1,262 km (784.2 mi)
- Winning time: 35h 13' 07"

Results
| | Winner | Fermo Camellini (ITA) |
| | Second | Maurice De Muer (FRA) |
| | Third | Frans Bonduel (BEL) |

The 1946 Paris–Nice was the eighth edition of the Paris–Nice cycle race and was held from 1 May to 5 May 1946. The race started in Choisy-le-Roi and finished in Nice. The race was won by Fermo Camellini.

== General classification ==
Final general classification

| Rank | Rider | Time |
|---|---|---|
| 1 | Fermo Camellini (ITA) | 35h 13' 07" |
| 2 | Maurice De Muer (FRA) | + 1' 43" |
| 3 | Frans Bonduel (BEL) | + 2' 53" |
| 3 | Ange Le Strat (FRA) | + 2' 53" |
| 5 | Pierre Brambilla (ITA) | + 3' 07" |
| 6 | Norbert Callens (BEL) | + 5' 07" |
| 7 | Briek Schotte (BEL) | + 6' 43" |
| 8 | Auguste Mallet (FRA) | + 7' 49" |
| 9 | Jean de Gribaldy (FRA) | + 8' 30" |
| 10 | Jules Lowie (BEL) | + 10' 35" |
