= Cilo =

Swiss bicycle manufacturer

- Industry: bicycle manufacturer
- Founded: 1927
- Founder: Charles Jan
- Headquarters: Romanel-sur-Lausanne, Switzerland
- Parent: TVS EBike Company AG
- Website: https://cilo-ebikes.com/en

Cilo is a Swiss manufacturer of bicycles that currently owned and operated by the Swiss E-Mobility Group (SEMG), part of the TVS Group. The company was founded in 1927 by Charles Jan.

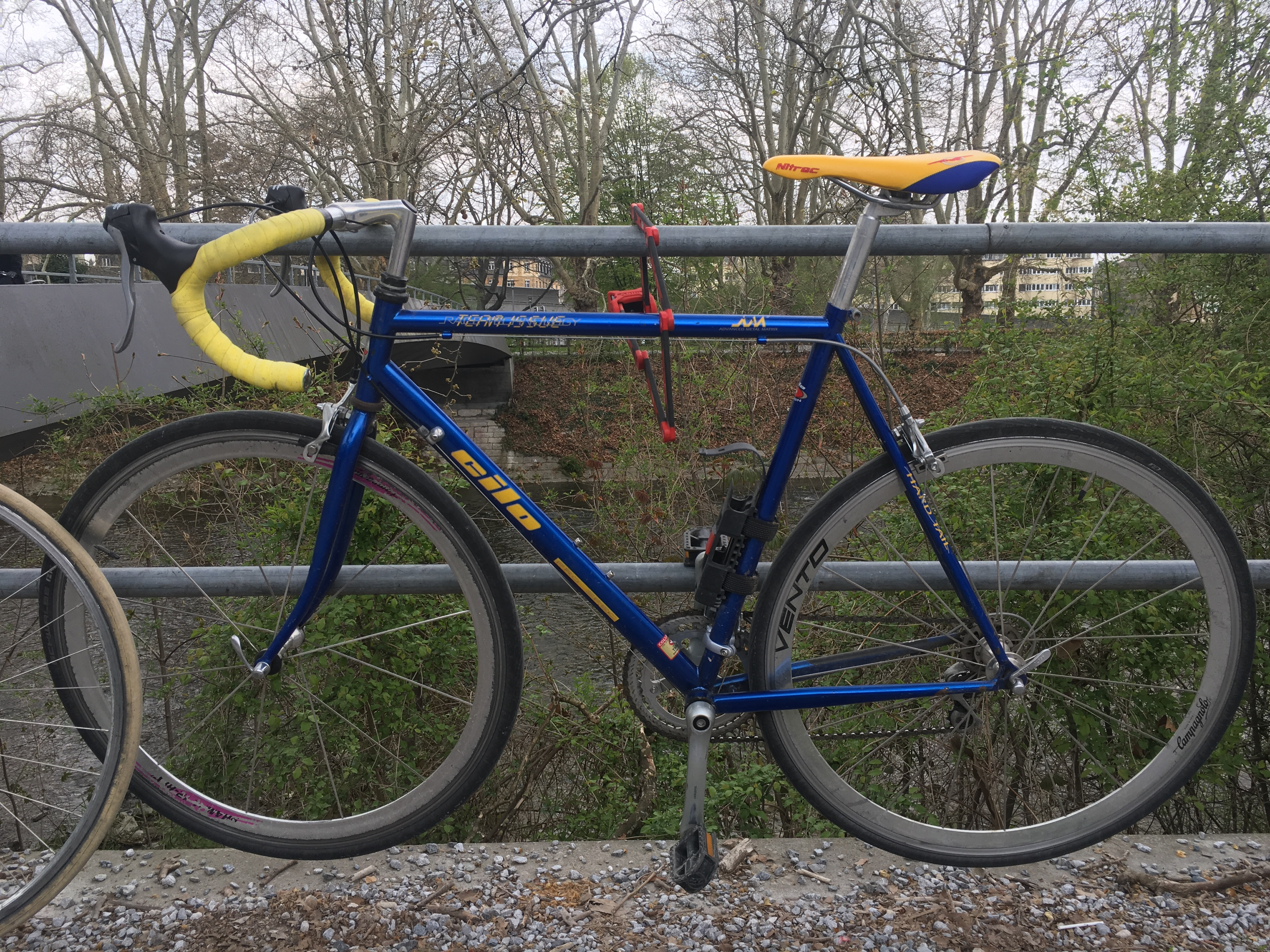
Cilo bicycle in Zurich, 2019

== History ==
Hans Knecht became world champion in 1946 riding a Cilo bicycle; other notable riders include Beat Breu, Daniel Gisiger and Tony Rominger.

The company went insolvency in 2002.

Colag AG purchased the trademark rights to Cilo in 2015.

Cilo co-sponsored the cycling team Cilo–Aufina with Aufina from 1980 to 1986, and then Atari and Ciclolinea in 1992.

The Cilo of the mid-1970s was a racing bicycle made of Reynolds 531 with the typical Swiss attention to detail. It had chromed forks, drop-outs and rear stays. All lugs were chromed and polished. The components included full 'top-of-the-line' Campagnolo, although Campy brakes were an option. Brooks saddle, Cinelli road bars and stem, Christophe clips and straps were provided. Silk tubulars mounted on Cerchio Fiamme rims were standard.

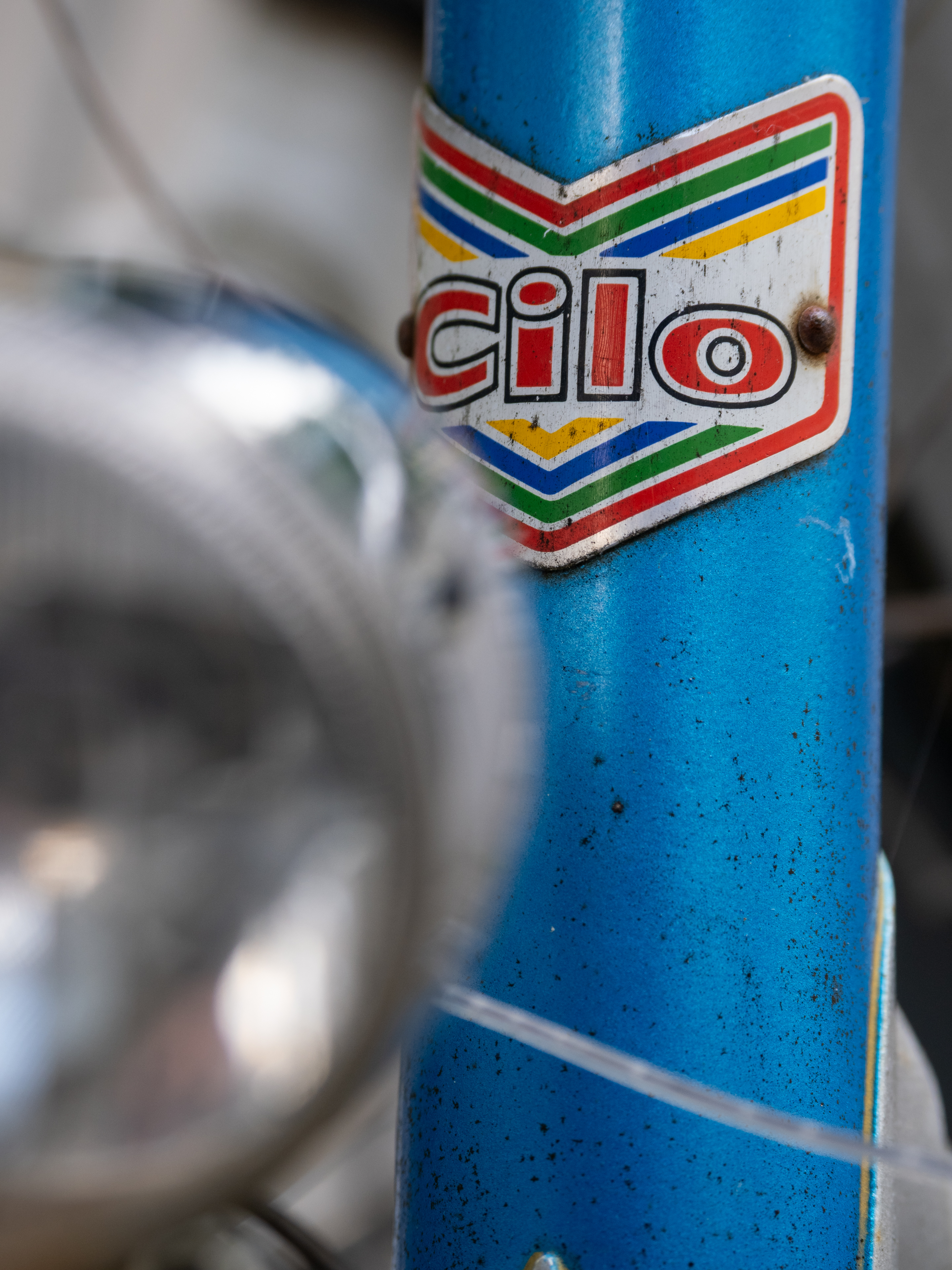
Cilo headbatch
