= Charles Guyot (cyclist, born 1890) =

Swiss cyclist (1890–1958)

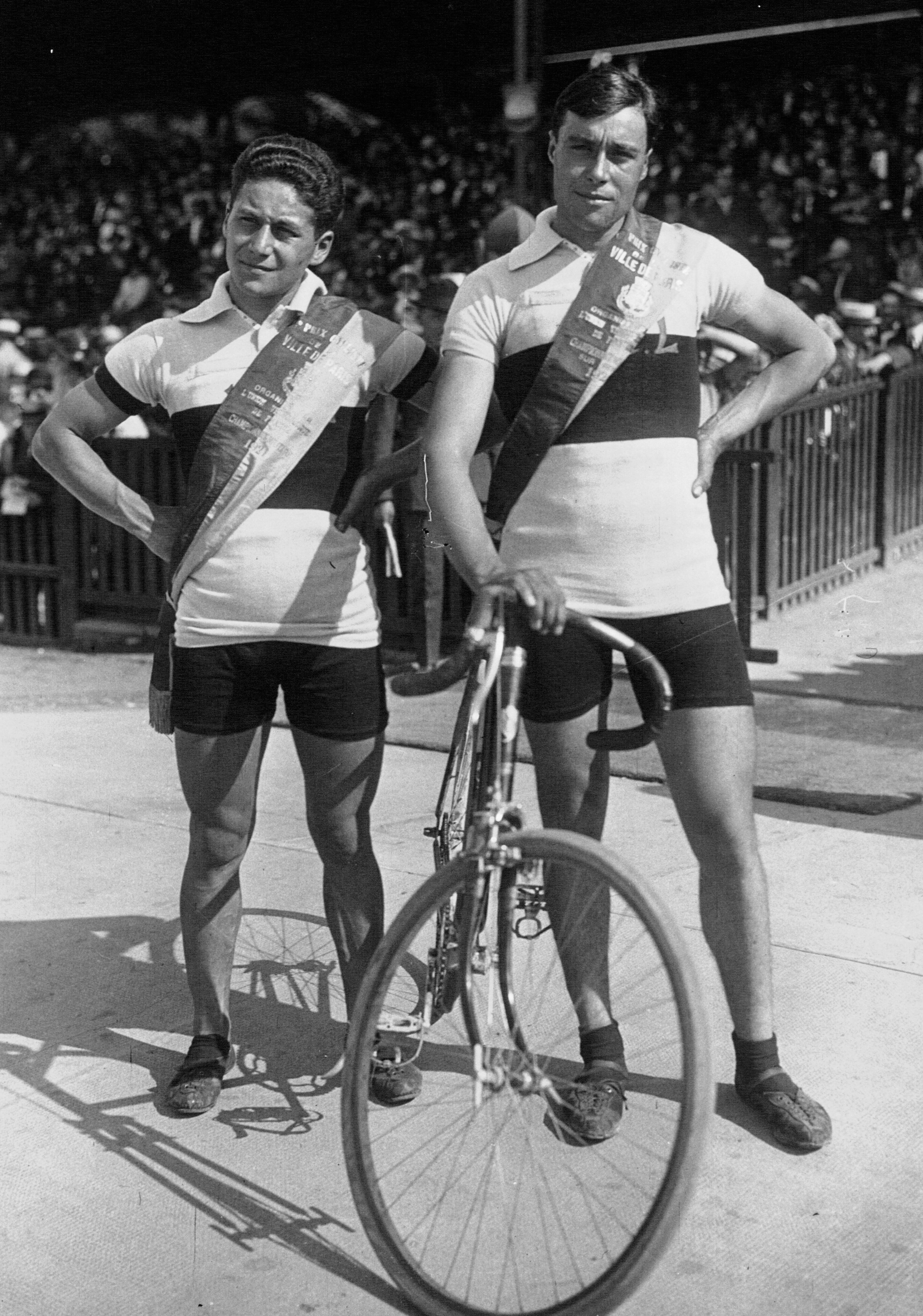
- Charles Guyot (left) and Fernand Canteloube in 1921

Personal information
- Born: 4 August 1890 Saint-Imier, Switzerland
- Died: 30 April 1958 (aged 67) Saint-Imier, Switzerland

Cycling career
- Sport: Cycling
- Role: Rider

Charles Guyot (French: [ʃaʁl ɡɥijo]; 4 August 1890 – 30 April 1958) was a Swiss racing cyclist. He was the Swiss National Road Race champion in 1909 and 1910. He also rode in three editions of the Tour de France. His son Charles was also a professional racing cyclist.
