= Artur Dorsé =

Spanish cyclist (1920–2010)

Personal information
- Born: 20 March 1920 Granollers, Catalonia, Spain
- Died: 7 May 2010 (aged 90)

Cycling career
- Sport: Cycling
- Discipline: Road
- Role: Rider

Professional team
- 1943–1949: Individual

Artur Dorsé (20 March 1920 – 7 May 2010) was a Spanish professional road bicycle racer, who competed as a professional between 1943 and 1949. He competed as an individual for his entire career.

== Major results ==
1944
1st Stage 7 Volta a Catalunya
1945
1st Road race, Catalonia Independent Road Championships
6th Overall Volta a Catalunya
1946
6th Trofeo Jaumendreu
1949
3rd Trofeo Jaumendreu
5th Overall Vuelta a la Comunidad Valenciana
