= Eduardo Lopes =

Portuguese cyclist

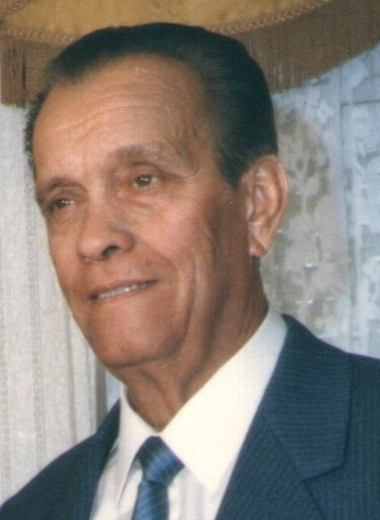
- Eduardo Lopes (1987)

Personal information
- Full name: Eduardo Lopes
- Born: 22 December 1917 Lisbon, Portugal
- Died: 22 August 1997 (aged 79) Amadora, Portugal

Cycling career
- Sport: Cycling
- Disciplines: Road and Track
- Role: Rider
- Rider type: Classics specialist

Amateur teams
- 1937: Sport Lisboa e Benfica
- 1937: CUF
- 1938: CUF

Professional teams
- 1939: Unidos (ex-CUF)
- 1940: Sport Lisboa e Benfica
- 1941: Sport Lisboa e Benfica
- 1942: Iluminante
- 1943: Iluminante
- 1944: Iluminante
- 1945: Iluminante
- 1946: Iluminante
- 1947: Sporting Clube de Portugal
- 1948: Sporting Clube de Portugal

Major wins
- National Championship Road (1937); Circuit of Boca do Inferno (1937); Circuit of Preparation (1938); District Speed Championship Track (1938); District Speed Championship Track (1939); District Speed Championship Track (1941); National Speed Championship Track (1941); Circuit of Bairrada (1942); Round to Lisbon (1942); Porto-Lisboa (1942); 50 Km Classics (1943); Circuit of Estoril (1943); Circuit of Lisbon (1944); Circuit of Torres Vedras (1944); Circuit of Mealhada (1945); Circuit of Malveira (1945); 176 Km Classics (1946); 166 Km Classics (1947); Circuit of Torres Vedras (1947); District Speed Championship Track (1947)

Eduardo Lopes (1917−1997) was a Portuguese professional road and track cyclist.

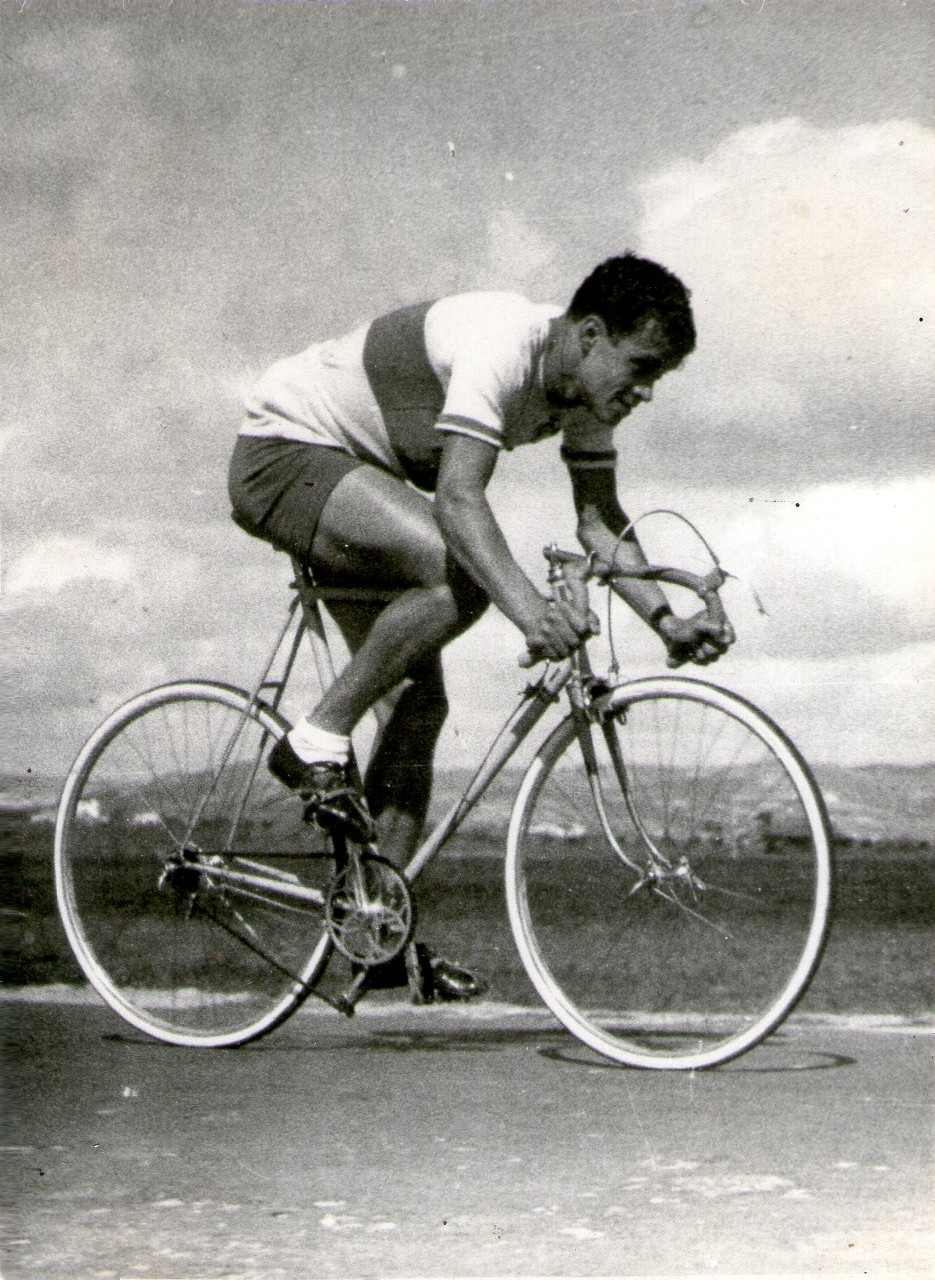
Unpublished personal photo of Eduardo Lopes from family album.

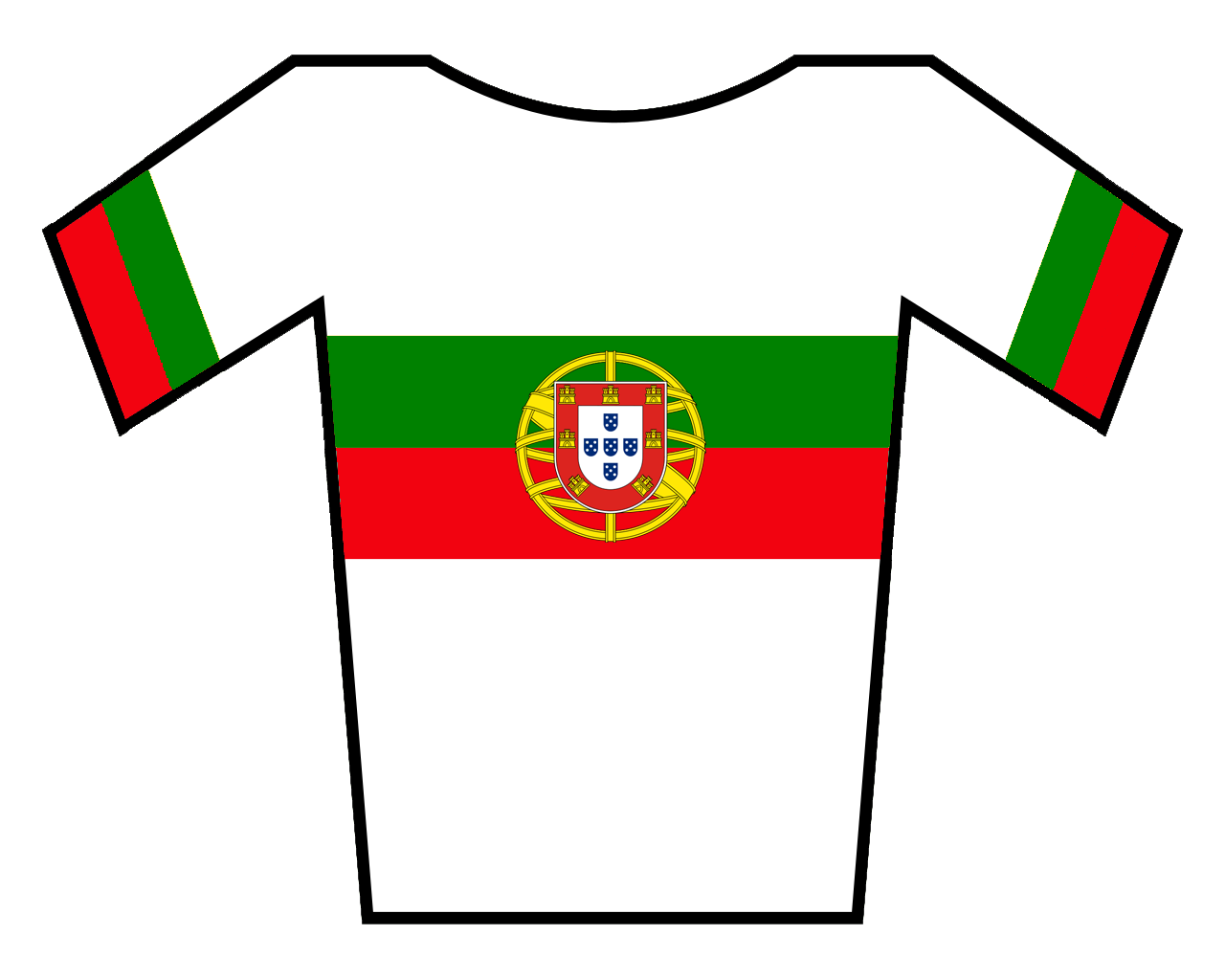
Portugal Cycling Champion

== Short biography ==
Lopes was born on 22 December 1917 in the civil parish of Socorro (Lisbon).

In 1937 he began his career as a rider for the CUF team, as an amateur.

In 1939 he became a professional. From 1937 to 1947, he had 45 wins on famous circuits at that time, including Bairrada, Mealhada, Torres Vedras, Malveira, and Round to Lisbon, with the highlight being his victory in 1942 in the classic Porto-Lisboa, performed in a single step, with an approximate duration of 10 hours, over a distance of about 330 km. This was the second longest world cycling route, after the Bordeaux-Paris (560 km) and therefore very prestigious both inside and outside Portugal. In 1939 he took 9th place in the Final General Classification of the Tour of Portugal. It was not his specialty or his favorite race. A distance runner and an endurance rider, as evidenced by his victory in Porto-Lisboa, he was mainly a sprinter, winning the District and National Championships of Speed in 1941 and ranking in 2nd place in the National Championships of Speed in 1944, riding for the Iluminante team, which was the primary team he rode for during his career. In 1941, he won the first two stages of the Tour of Portugal, riding in the team of Sport Lisboa e Benfica. In Spain, he was second in the Tour of Mallorca in 1942 and third in the 3rd stage of the Vuelta a España at Badajoz in 1945. In 1947, he concluded his career at the Sporting Clube de Portugal, winning the 166 km Classics, the Circuit of Torres Vedras, being again District Speed Champion and taking first place in the Prologue Stage 1 of the Tour of Portugal, on the runway of Jose Alvalade Stadium.

Was together with João Lourenço, the greatest Portuguese "pistard" of the years 40/50, according to UVP-FPC.

He died on 22 August 1997 at the age of 79, of a cerebral vascular accident.

== Porto-Lisbon Classic race ==
Although Eduardo Lopes has won several races and circuits (45 victories officially registered on UCI), his most important victory was the famous Portuguese classic race called Porto-Lisboa, in 1942. The Oporto-Lisbon was the most important and popular race in Portugal together with the Tour of Portugal.
The classic Porto-Lisboa with about 330 km of distance, whose first edition was held in 1911, was the world longest race in one single stage, since the end of Bordeaux-Paris (560 km), in 1988.
Eduardo Lopes got the time of 10 hours, 25 minutes and 12 seconds, less than about 3 hours the time of the 1941's edition winner. His time "withstood" six more editions of the race and was only beaten in 1956 (14 years later) and for a few seconds.

== Sport career (ratings) ==
- 1937 - 1st at the Circuit of Povoa (POR)
- 1937 - 1st at the Circuit of Cadaval (POR)
- 1937 - 1st at the Circuit of Boca do Inferno (POR)
- 1937 - 1st at the Grand Prix of Autumn (POR)
- 1937 - 1st at the National Road Championship, Amateurs (POR)
- 1938 - 1st at the 1st Preparation Circuit, Lisbon (POR)
- 1938 - 1st at the District Speed Championship, Lisbon (POR)
- 1939 - 1st in 166 km Classics, Lisbon (POR)
- 1939 - 1st at the Circuit of General Carmona, Cascais (POR)
- 1939 - 9th at the Final General Classification of the Tour of Portugal (POR)
- 1939 - 2nd at the third stage of Madrid - Lisboa, Mérida (POR)
- 1939 - 1st in American 2 Hours, Lumiar Stadium (POR)
- 1939 - 1st at the District Speed Championship, Lisbon (POR)
- 1940 - 1st at the Lisboa-Santarem-Lisboa (POR)
- 1940 - 1st at the sixth stage of the Tour of Portugal, Evora (POR)
- 1940 - 1st at the eighth stage of the Tour of Portugal, Castelo Branco (POR)
- 1941 - 1st at the first stage of the Tour of Portugal, Espinho (POR)
- 1941 - 1st at the second stage of the Tour of Portugal, Espinho (POR)
- 1941 - 1st at the District Speed Championship, Lisbon (POR)
- 1941 - 1st at the National Speed Championship, Lisbon (POR)
- 1942 - 1st at the Bairrada Circuit (POR)
- 1942 - 1st at the Tour of Lisbon (POR)
- 1942 - 1st at Porto-Lisboa, Lisbon (POR)
- 1942 - 1st at the second stage of Tour of Mallorca, Felanitx (ESP)
- 1942 - 1st at Team Pursuit in Great International Gala, Barcelona (ESP)
- 1942 - 1st at Madison in Great International Gala, Barcelona (ESP)
- 1942 - 2nd at the Vuelta a Mallorca (ESP)
- 1943 - 1st at 50 km Classics (POR)
- 1943 - 1st at the Circuit of Estoril (POR)
- 1943 - 1st at Madison, Lumiar Stadium, Lisbon (POR)
- 1943 - 1st at Sprint, Barcelona (ESP)
- 1944 - 1st at the Lisbon-Santarem-Lisbon (POR)
- 1944 - 1st at the Circuit of Lisbon (POR)
- 1944 - 1st at the Circuit of Torres Vedras (POR)
- 1944 - 2nd at District Speed Championship (POR)
- 1944 - 2nd in the National Speed Championship (POR)
- 1945 - 1st at the 166 km Classics (POR)
- 1945 - 1st at the 176 km Classics (POR)
- 1945 - 1st in Stage 1 part A of Bairrada Circuit (POR)
- 1945 - 1st at American, Independents, Lumiar Stadium (POR)
- 1945 - 1st at the Circuit of Mealhada (POR)
- 1945 - 1st at the Circuit of Malveira (POR)
- 1945 - 1st at the Circuit of Livramento (POR)
- 1945 - 1st at the Madison, Lumiar Stadium, Lisbon (POR)
- 1945 - 3rd at the third stage of the Vuelta a España, Badajoz (ESP)
- 1946 - 1st at the 166 km Classics (POR)
- 1946 - 1st at the 176 km Classics (POR)
- 1946 - 1st at the third stage of the Tour of Portugal, Faro (POR)
- 1946 - 2nd at the National Championship Road (POR)
- 1947 - 1st at the 166 km Classics (POR)
- 1947 - 1st at the Lisboa-Santarem-Lisboa (POR)
- 1947 - 1st at the Circuit of Torres Vedras (POR)
- 1947 - 1st at the District Speed Championship, Lisbon (POR)
- 1947 - 1st in the Prologue of the first stage of the Tour of Portugal, Lisbon (Alvalade Track) (POR)

== Titles ==
Year	1937	1938	1939	1940	1941	1942	1943	1944	1945	1946	1947	Total
Victories	5	2	4	3	4	6	4	3	8	3	5	47

== Bibliography ==
- "Em Memória de Eduardo Lopes - Glória e Drama de um Campeão de Ciclismo" by Eduardo Cunha Lopes. Bubok Edition (2014). 373 p. Illustrated (b&w). ISBN 978-84-686-6046-2
- "Copa España" by Eduardo Cunha Lopes. Bubok Edition (2016). 113 p. Illustrated (b&w)
- "As XXIV Horas do Metropolitano" by Eduardo Cunha Lopes. Bubok Edition (2017). 91 p. Illustrated (b&w)
- "Ciclismo e Ciclistas (Memórias de um Veterano)" by Amândio Nunes Monteiro. Author's Edition (2011). 254 p. Illustrated (b&w)
- "UVP-FPC: 100 Anos de Ciclismo". Edition of Portuguese Cycling Federation (1999). 159 p. Illustrated (b&w)
- "História da Volta" by Guita Júnior. Talento Edition (2006). 212 p. Illustrated. ISBN 972-8868-19-7
