= Miguel Casas =

Spanish cyclist (1920–2003)

Personal information
- Born: 7 August 1920 Barcelona, Spain
- Died: 6 November 2003 (aged 83) Sabadell, Spain

Cycling career
- Sport: Cycling
- Discipline: Road
- Role: Rider

Professional teams
- 1942–1945: Individual
- 1946: UE Sants

Miguel Casas (7 August 1920 – 6 November 2003) was a Spanish cyclist. He won the Volta a Catalunya in 1944. He also competed in the 1945 Vuelta a España, where he finished 18th overall.

== Major results ==
1942
1st Stage 5 Volta a Catalunya
1944
1st Overall Volta a Catalunya

1st Stage 4a (ITT)

3rd Overall Vuelta a Cantabria
1945
10th Trofeo Jaumendreu
