= Ignacio Orbaiceta =

Spanish cyclist (1923–2011)

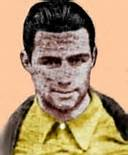

Personal information
- Full name: Ignacio Orbaiceta Zabalza
- Born: 4 April 1923 Egüés, Spain
- Died: 20 April 2011 (aged 88) Pamplona, Spain

Cycling career
- Sport: Cycling
- Discipline: Road
- Role: Rider

Professional teams
- 1941: Individual
- 1942: CA Osasuna
- 1943: U.C. Navarra
- 1944–1945: Galindo
- 1946–1947: Pirelli
- 1948–1949: UD Sans
- 1948: Peugeot–Dunlop
- 1949: Sangalhos

Ignacio Orbaiceta Zabalza (4 April 1923 – 20 April 2011) was a Spanish racing cyclist. Professional from 1941 to 1949, Orbaiceta had 34 victories, including a stage win of the 1946 Vuelta a España.

== Major results ==
1941
2nd Circuito de Getxo
1942
1st GP Pascuas
1943
3rd National Cyclo-cross Championships
3rd GP Pascuas
1944
1st GP Pascuas
1st Stage 5 Vuelta a la Comunidad Valenciana
1st Stage 2 Volta a Catalunya
1st Stages 4, 6 & 8 Gran Premio Victoria Manresa
1945
1st GP Pascuas
2nd National Cyclo-cross Championships
2nd Trofeo del Sprint
1946
1st Stage 3 Vuelta a España
1st Trofeo del Sprint
1st Stages 1 & 6 Volta a Catalunya
2nd Circuito de Getxo
1949
1st Trofeo del Sprint
