= 1946 Vuelta a España =

Race details
- Dates: 7 – 30 May
- Stages: 21
- Distance: 3,836 km (2,384 mi)
- Winning time: 137h 10' 38"

Results
Jersey awarded to the overall winner	Winner	Dalmacio Langarica (ESP)
	Second	Julián Berrendero (ESP)
	Third	Jan Lambrichs (NED)
	Mountains	Emilio Rodríguez (ESP)

The 6th Vuelta a España (Tour of Spain), a long-distance bicycle stage race and one of the three grand tours, was held from 7 to 30 May 1946. It consisted of 21 stages covering a total of 3,836 km (2,384 mi), and was won by Dalmacio Langarica. Emilio Rodríguez won the mountains classification.

After the 22nd stage, Jan Lambrichs was in second place. The Dutch team then received a letter, saying that Lambrichs should give up his second place, otherwise he would reach the finish in Madrid in an ambulance. The team manager decided not to tell Lambrichs about this threat, but gave him extra security. In the final stage, Berrendero escaped and left everybody behind, including Lambrichs, and took over the second place. The next day, the Dutch team received a box of Cuban cigars from the unknown person who had sent the threat.

== Route ==
List of stages
Stage	Date	Course	Distance	Type	Winner
1	7 May	Madrid to Salamanca	212 km (132 mi)		Joaquín Olmos (ESP)
2	8 May	Salamanca to Béjar	73 km (45 mi)	Individual time trial	Miguel Gual (ESP)
3	8 May	Béjar to Cáceres	141 km (88 mi)		Antonio Andrés Sancho (ESP)
4	9 May	Cáceres to Badajoz	132 km (82 mi)		Ignacio Orbaiceta (ESP)
5	10 May	Badajoz to Seville	218 km (135 mi)		Julián Berrendero (ESP)
6	12 May	Seville to Granada	251 km (156 mi)		Jan Lambrichs (NED)
7	13 May	Granada to Baza	107 km (66 mi)		Dalmacio Langarica (ESP)
8	14 May	Baza to Murcia	178 km (111 mi)		João Lourenço (POR)
9	15 May	Murcia to Valencia	264 km (164 mi)		Alejandro Fombellida (ESP)
10	17 May	Valencia to Castellón	67 km (42 mi)	Team time trial	Holland
11	17 May	Castellón to Tortosa	123 km (76 mi)		Alejandro Fombellida (ESP)
12	18 May	Tortosa to Barcelona	215 km (134 mi)		Dalmacio Langarica (ESP)
13	19 May	Barcelona to Lleida	162 km (101 mi)		Delio Rodríguez (ESP)
14	20 May	Lleida to Zaragoza	144 km (89 mi)		Delio Rodríguez (ESP)
15	21 May	Zaragoza to San Sebastián	276 km (171 mi)		Delio Rodríguez (ESP)
16	23 May	San Sebastián to Bilbao	207 km (129 mi)		Dalmacio Langarica (ESP)
17	24 May	Bilbao to Santander	226 km (140 mi)		Delio Rodríguez (ESP)
18	25 May	Santander to Reinosa	110 km (68 mi)		Dalmacio Langarica (ESP)
19	26 May	Reinosa to Gijón	204 km (127 mi)		Delio Rodríguez (ESP)
20	28 May	Gijón to Oviedo	53 km (33 mi)	Individual time trial	Dalmacio Langarica (ESP)
21	28 May	Oviedo to León	119 km (74 mi)		Julián Berrendero (ESP)
22	29 May	León to Valladolid	134 km (83 mi)		Alejandro Fombellida (ESP)
23	30 May	Valladolid to Madrid	200 km (124 mi)		Julián Berrendero (ESP)
	Total		3,836 km (2,384 mi)		

== Results ==
=== Final General Classification ===
Rank	Rider	Team	Time
1	(Spain) Dalmacio Langarica		137h 10' 38"
2	(Spain) Julián Berrendero		+ 17' 32"
3	(Netherlands) Jan Lambrichs		+ 23' 54"
4	(Spain) Manuel Costa		+ 24' 19"
5	(Spain) Delio Rodríguez		+ 45' 04"
6	(Spain) Alejandro Fombellida		+ 46' 09"
7	(Spain) Antonio-Andres Sancho		+ 1h 00' 10"
8	(Spain) Emilio Rodríguez		+ 1h 03' 45"
9	(Spain) José Gutierrez		+ 1h 18' 48"
10	(Portugal) Joao Rebelo		+ 1h 53' 37"
11	(Switzerland) Georges Aeschlimann		
12	(Spain) Cipriano Aguirrezabal		
13	(Spain) Bernardo Ruiz		
14	(Spain) Pastor Rodríguez		
15	(Spain) Joaquim Olmos		
16	(Spain) Antonio Martin		
17	(Switzerland) Ernest Kuhn		
18	(Spain) Vicente Miro		
19	(Spain) José Lopez Gandara		
20	(Netherlands) Frans Pauwels		
21	(Spain) Joaquim Jiménez		
22	(Spain) Pedro Font		
23	(Netherlands) Cees Joosen		
24	(Spain) Gabriel Palmer		
25	(Switzerland) Theo Perret		
