= Georges Aeschlimann =

Swiss cyclist

Personal information
- Born: 11 January 1920 Bern, Switzerland
- Died: 10 November 2010 (aged 90) La Neuveville, Switzerland

Cycling career
- Sport: Cycling
- Role: Rider

Georges Aeschlimann (11 January 1920 – 10 November 2010) was a Swiss racing cyclist. He rode in the 1948 and 1949 Tour de France.

== Major results ==
1948
10th Tour de Romandie
