= Huub Sijen =

Dutch cyclist

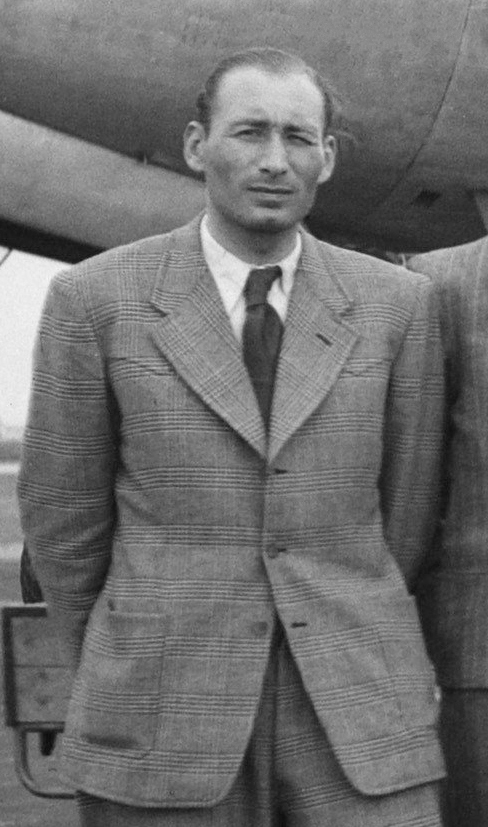
- Huub Sijen in 1946

Personal information
- Born: 21 November 1918 Maastricht, Netherlands
- Died: 20 February 1965 (aged 46) Geleen, Netherlands

Cycling career
- Sport: Cycling
- Role: Rider

Huub Sijen (21 November 1918 – 20 February 1965) was a Dutch racing cyclist. He rode the Tour de France in 1939, 1947 and 1949.
