= Lucien Lauk =

French cyclist

Personal information
- Born: 29 June 1911 Paris, France
- Died: 8 June 2001 (aged 89) Paris, France

Cycling career
- Sport: Cycling
- Role: Rider

Lucien Lauk (29 June 1911 – 8 June 2001) was a French racing cyclist. He rode in the 1948 Tour de France.
