= José Vidal Porcar =

Spanish cyclist (1924–1992)

Personal information
- Born: 6 December 1924
- Died: 15 June 1992 (aged 67)

Cycling career
- Sport: Cycling
- Role: Rider

José Vidal Porcar (6 December 1924 – 15 June 1992) was a Spanish racing cyclist. He rode in the 1953 Tour de France.
