= Louis Thiétard =

French cyclist (1910–1998)

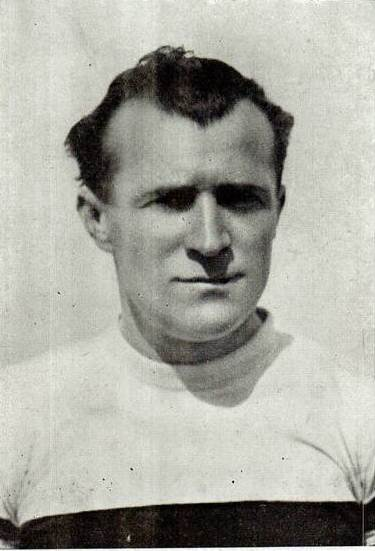
- Louis Thiétard (1940)

Personal information
- Born: 31 May 1910 Anzin, France
- Died: 21 January 1998 (aged 87) Saint-Gilles-Croix-de-Vie, France

Cycling career
- Sport: Cycling
- Role: Rider

Louis Thiétard (31 May 1910 – 21 January 1998) was a French cyclist. He rode in the 1947, 1948 and 1949 Tour de France. He also finished third in the 1943 Paris–Roubaix, the 1944 Paris–Roubaix and the 1947 Paris–Roubaix.
