= Fermo Camellini =

Italian-French cyclist

Personal information
- Full name: Fermo Camellini
- Born: 7 December 1914 Scandiano, Italy
- Died: 27 August 2010 (aged 95)

Cycling career
- Sport: Cycling
- Discipline: Road
- Role: Rider

Major wins
- Paris–Nice (1946); La Flèche Wallonne (1948); Tour de France, 2 stages

Fermo Camellini (7 December 1914 – 27 August 2010) was an Italian-French road bicycle racer who became a naturalized French citizen on 8 October 1948. He won the Paris–Nice in 1946 and the Flèche Wallonne in 1948, as well as two stages at the 1947 Tour de France. He also wore the pink jersey as leader of the general classification during three stages of 1946 Giro d'Italia. He was born in Scandiano, Reggio Emilia.

== Major results ==
1937
GP Guillamont
Nice – La Turbie
1938
Nice – Annot – Nice
Circuit des Alpes
1939
Alès
Circuit des Maures Toulon
Circuit du Mont Ventoux
GP Côte d'Azur
Ronde du Gard
Tour du Vaucluse
1940
Nice
1941
Circuit du Mont Ventoux
La Turbie
Nice-Mont Chauve
Prix d'Amberieu
Saint-Chamond
1942
GP Haute Savoie
1944
GP de Cagnes sur Mer
1945
Circuit du Limousin
GP Côte d'Azur
GP de Provence
GP Nice
Trophée International du Sud-Ouest
Paris-Reims
1946
A Travers Lausanne
Nice – Mont Agel
Four Days of Switzerland
Paris–Nice
1947
Lausanne
Tour de France:

Winner stage 8 and 10
7th place overall classification

1948
GP de l'Echo d'Oran
La Flèche Wallonne
Tour de France:

8th place overall classification

1950
Pau
