= Miguel Gual =

Spanish cyclist (1919–2010)

Personal information
- Full name: Miguel Gual Bauza
- Born: 15 December 1919 Sant Joan, Spain
- Died: 3 December 2010 (aged 90) Sant Joan, Spain

Cycling career
- Sport: Cycling
- Discipline: Road
- Role: Rider

Professional teams
- 1945: AC Montjuich
- 1946–1947: UD Sans–Pirelli
- 1948: Galindo
- 1948: Peugeot–Dunlop
- 1948: Paloma
- 1948: Veloz Sport Balear
- 1949–1952: Individual
- 1952: Berkel
- 1953: Fiorelli
- 1954: Pena Solera
- 1955: Mariotas
- 1956: Minaco Peugeot

Miguel Gual Bauza (15 December 1919 – 3 December 2010) was a Spanish racing cyclist. He won 8 stages of the Vuelta a España throughout his career.

== Major results ==
1945
1st Overall Circuito del Norte

1st Stages 1 & 8

1st Stages 5, 6 & 12 Volta a Catalunya
4th Overall Vuelta a España

1st Stages 3, 10 & 11

1946
1st Trofeo Masferrer
1st Stage 2 (ITT) Vuelta a España
1st Stages 2 & 5 Volta a Catalunya
2nd Trofeo del Sprint
3rd Trofeo Jaumendreu
1947
1st Circuito de Getxo
1st GP Pascuas
1st Trofeo Masferrer
1st Stage 2 Vuelta a Burgos
2nd Trofeo del Sprint
2nd Overall Volta a Catalunya

1st Stages 4, 6 & 8

2nd Subida a la Cuesta de Santo Domingo
3rd National Road Race Championships
3rd National Hill Climb Championships
1948
1st Stage 2 Volta a Catalunya
3rd National Hill Climb Championships
9th Overall Vuelta a España

1st Stages 8, 7, 16 & 19

1949
1st Clásica a los Puertos de Guadarrama
1950
1st Overall Vuelta a Asturias
1952
1st Stage 3 GP Ayuntamiento de Bilbao
1953
4th Trofeo Masferrer
1954
1st Stage 3 Vuelta a la Comunidad Valenciana
1955
1st Stage 7 Volta a Catalunya
1956
1st Stage 7 Vuelta a Asturias
4th Overall Euskal Bizikleta
