= Cipriano Elis =

Spanish cyclist (1907–1984)

Personal information
- Full name: Cipriano Elis de la Hoz
- Born: 26 September 1907 Muriedas, Cantabria, Spain
- Died: 14 January 1984 (aged 76) Chera, Valencia, Spain

Cycling career
- Sport: Cycling
- Discipline: Road
- Role: Rider

Cipriano Elis de la Hoz (26 September 1907 – 14 January 1984) was a Spanish racing cyclist. He rode in the 1928 Tour de France.
