= Dalmacio Langarica =

Spanish cyclist (1919–1985)

Personal information
- Full name: Dalmacio Langarica
- Born: 5 December 1919 Ochandiano, Spain
- Died: 24 January 1985 (aged 65) Basauri, Spain

Cycling career
- Sport: Cycling
- Discipline: Road
- Role: Rider

Major wins
- 1946 Vuelta a España

Dalmacio Langarica Lizasoain (5 December 1919 – 24 January 1985) was a Spanish professional road racing cyclist during the 1940s and 1950s and a directeur sportif in the 1970s.

Langarica rode to victory over 23 stages and across 3,797 km (2,359 mi) to win the sixth edition of his country's Grand Tour, the 1946 Vuelta a España. He was accompanied to the podium by runner-up Julián Berrendero, third place Jan Lambrichs, fourth place Manuel Costa and defending champion Delio Rodríguez in fifth place.

At the 1948 Vuelta, Langarica tried desperately to best eventual winner Bernardo Ruiz but suffered a bad fall during the stage between A Coruña and Ourense. He ended finishing fourth overall and second in the climbers classification.

After finishing his competitive cycling career, Langarica became a directeur sportif, including serving as manager for the all-Spaniard cycling team, KAS, which included Francisco Galdós, who finished in 8th place (the highest finish of a Spaniard at the 1970 Tour de France).

== Major results ==
1944
1st, Subida al Naranco
1946
1st, Overall, Vuelta a España
1948
4th, Overall, Vuelta a España
