= Juan Gimeno =

Spanish cyclist (1913–1998)

Personal information
- Full name: Juan Gimeno Guillamón
- Born: 20 May 1913 Barcelona, Spain
- Died: 5 May 1998 (aged 84) Barcelona, Spain

Cycling career
- Sport: Cycling
- Discipline: Road
- Role: Rider

Professional teams
- 1932: CC Collblanc
- 1933–1934: AC Montjuïc
- 1935: Orbea
- 1936: PC William Tarin
- 1937: UE Sants
- 1940: UE Sants
- 1941–1943: FC Barcelona
- 1944: Galindo
- 1945: UE Sants
- 1946: Peña Rhin
- 1946–1948: Galindo–Chicles Tabay

Juan Gimeno Guillamón (20 May 1913 in Barcelona – 5 May 1998 in Barcelona) was a Spanish professional road cyclist. He finished 3rd overall in the 1945 Vuelta a España and won the 4th stage. He was also the Spanish national road race champion the same year.

== Major results ==
1934
6th Overall Volta a Catalunya
1936
3rd Overall Volta a Catalunya
1939
1st Stage 13 Tour du Maroc
1940
1st Overall Vuelta a Mallorca
1st Stage 4 Vuelta a Cantabria
1st Stage 7 Circuito del Norte
2nd Trofeo Masferrer
5th Overall Volta a Catalunya
1941
1st Stage 5a Circuito del Norte
1942
1st Overall Gran Premio Vittoria

1st Stages 2, 4 & 5

4th Overall Vuelta a España
1943
1st Stage 3 Gran Premio Vittoria
4th Overall Volta a Catalunya
1944
6th Overall Vuelta a la Comunidad Valenciana
10th Overall Volta a Catalunya
1945
1st Road race, National Road Championships
2nd Overall Volta a Catalunya

1st Stage 9

3rd Overall Vuelta a España

1st Stage 4

1946
9th Trofeo Masferrer
1947
3rd Overall Vuelta a la Comunidad Valenciana
1948
3rd Overall Vuelta a la Comunidad Valenciana
