= Turía (river) =

River in Spain

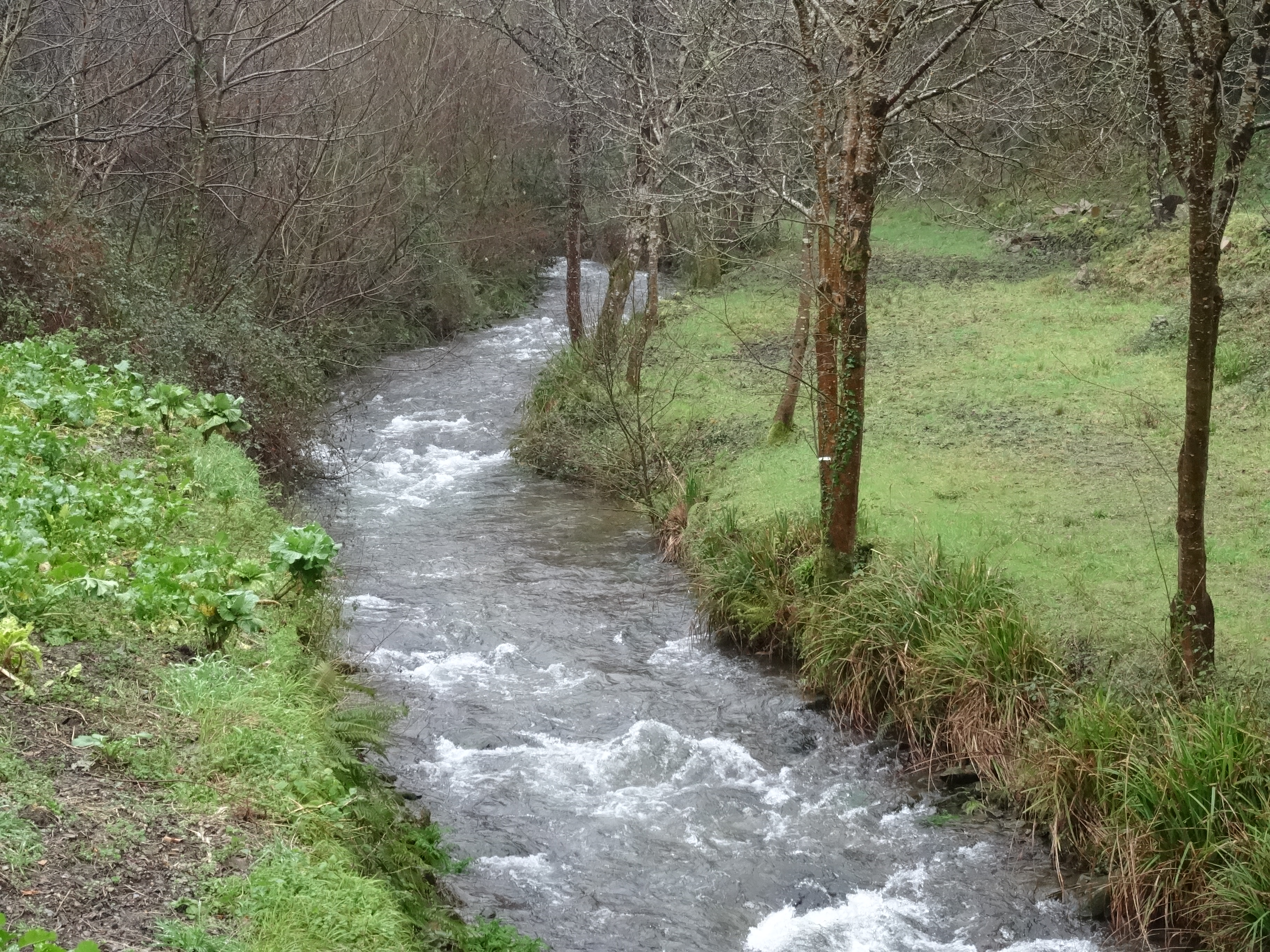
- Native name: Río Turía (Spanish)

Location
- Country: Spain
- Autonomous Community: Galicia
- City: A Pontenova

Physical characteristics
- Source: Near As Veigas, Taramundi
  - location: Asturias
- Mouth: Eo River
  - location: A Pontenova, Spain
  - coordinates: 43°21′14″N 7°11′28″W
  - elevation: 250 m (820 ft)
- Length: 9 km (5.6 mi)

Basin features
- Passes through: Asturias: As Veigas, Mazonovo, Taramundi, A Garda and Mousende. Lugo: Conforto and A Pontenova.

The Turía (Spanish: Río Turía) is a small river in Galicia, Spain. It is 9 kilometres (6 mi) long, and its mouth is at an elevation of 250 metres (820 ft) above the sea. It rises in the town of Taramundi (Asturias) and drains into the Eo River in the town of A Pontenova (Lugo Province).

The Turía river gives its name to the Turía Valley or “Valle del Turía” that crosses horizontally before emptying into the Eo River. The Turía River is fed by numerous streams and creeks from the mountains above the valley, and is part of the Eo UNESCO biosphere reserve.

While the river has its source in Asturias, the major part of its course is in Lugo province.

The Turía River is a source of industry and its waters are used to generate socio-economic activities based on ancient traditions such as Navajeros crafts and textiles, as well as the primary industry of salmon farming in A Pontenova.

== See also ==
- Rivers of Galicia
