= Turia Valley =

- Spanish: Valle del Turía
- Floor elevation: 200 m (660 ft)
- Area: 90 km^{2} (35 sq mi)

Geography
- Location: Asturias and Galicia, Spain
- Population centers: A Pontenova (Galicia) and Taramundi (Asturias)

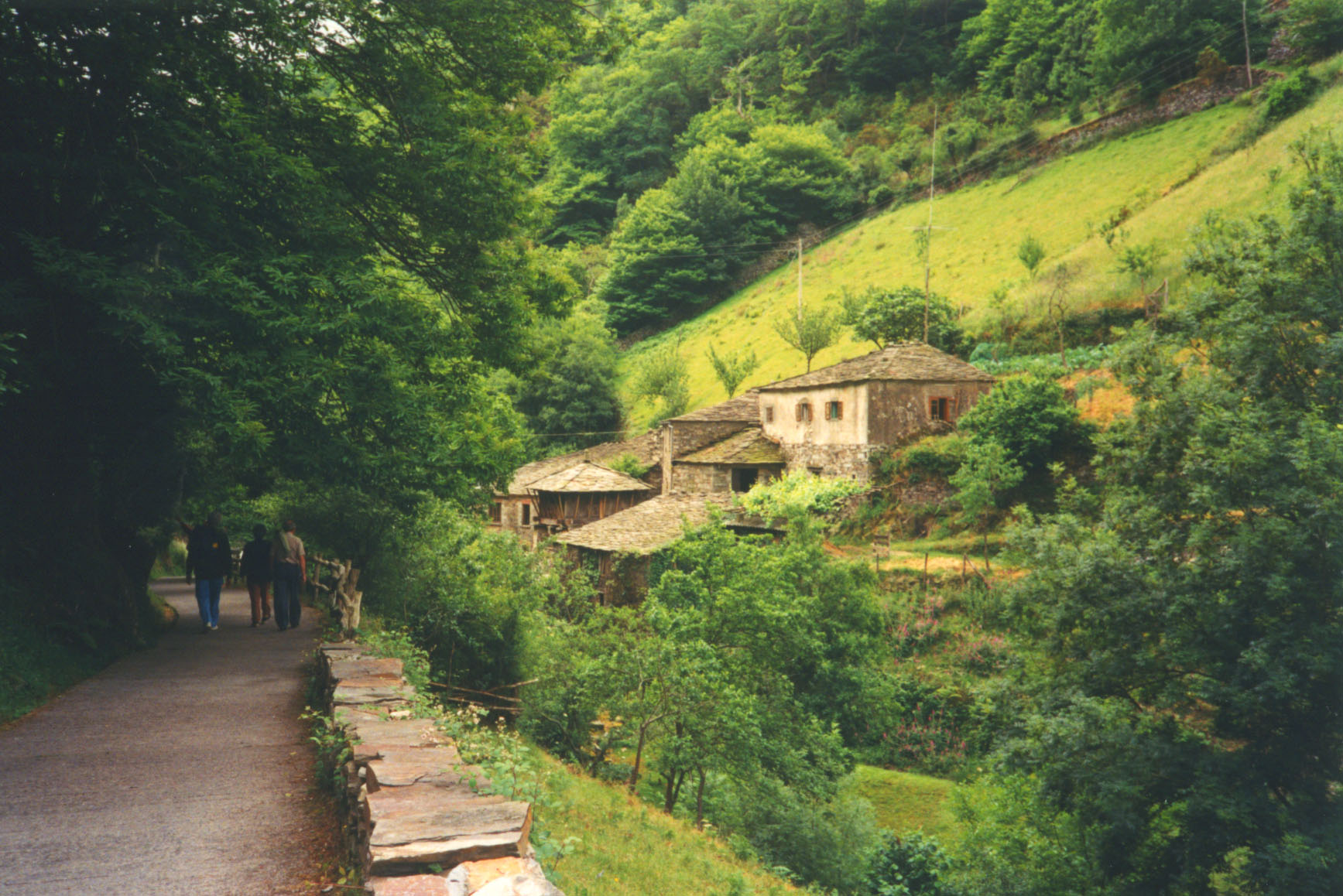
Os Teixois Village

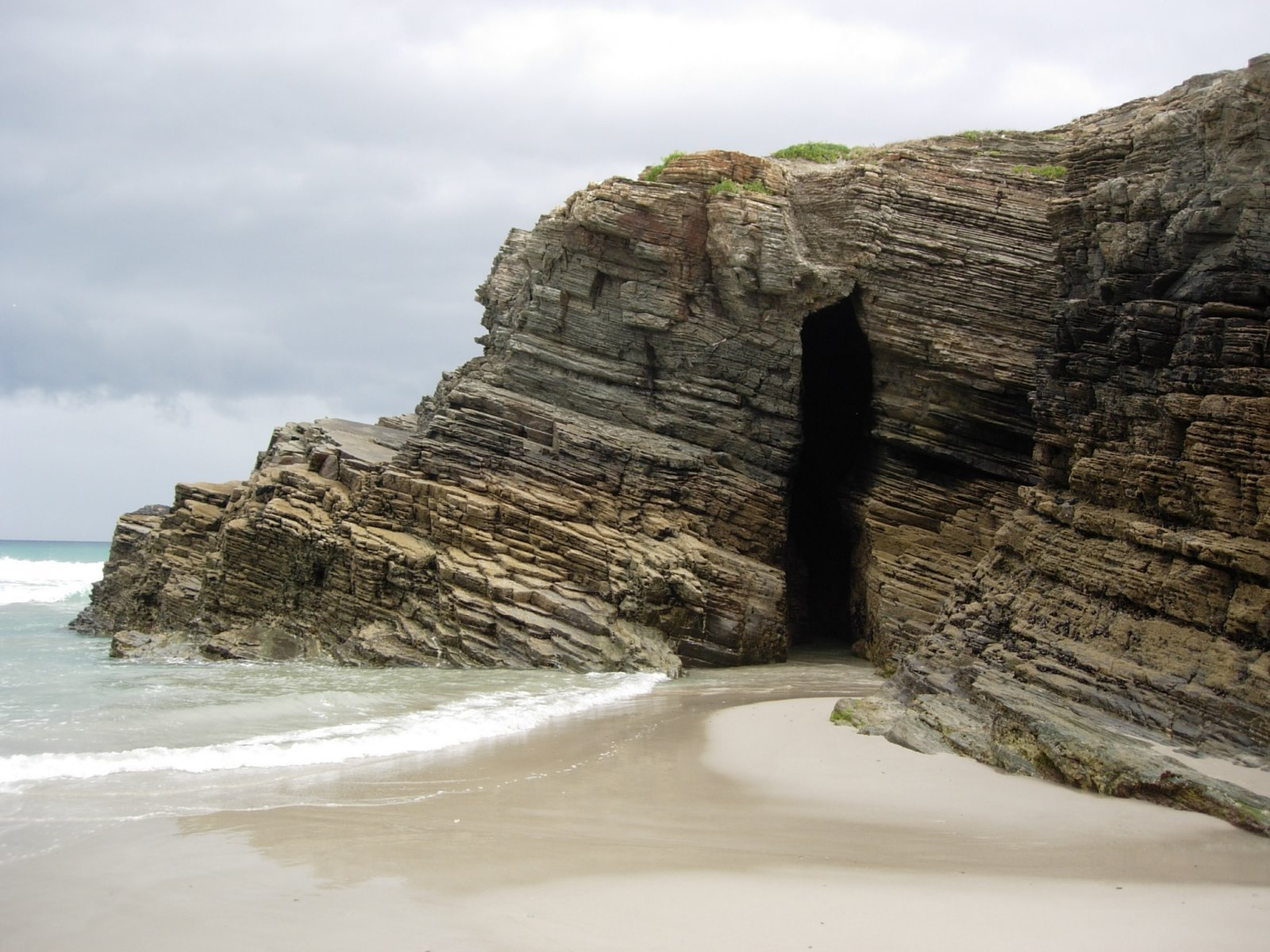
Das Catedrais Beach

The Turia Valley (Spanish: Valle del Turía) is a small valley on the western border of the Cantabrian Mountains in the northwest of Spain which is close to beaches and is divided by two autonomous communities: Asturias and Galicia. It consists of an area of 90 km^{2}, 3,910 inhabitants and is 200 m above sea level. The two main towns are A Pontenova (Galicia) and Taramundi (Asturias).

== Geography ==
The Turia Valley is a range of small mountains, ancient oak forests and rivers. It is dotted with small stoned hamlets and villages and is only 25 minutes from the sea and remote beaches.

The climate in the region is pleasant throughout the year. As with the rest of northern Spain (or the Green Spain), the climate is more variable than the southern parts of Spain and is characterised by an Atlantic climate. The average temperature in summer is usually around 26 °C. The average temperature in winter is 8 °C (12 °C in the day and 4 °C at night).

The Turía River (250 m altitude) gives its name to the valley. The Turia Valley is surrounded by hills and mountains, including, Sierra de Piedafita (900 m), Sierra de Ouroso (1033 m), Sierras de Dendin (900 m), Sierra de Teixedais (900 m) and Sierra de Eirua (700 m).

The patrimony of the Valley has more than 60 religious buildings and places of worship, such as the church of San Martin de Tarimundi founded in the 18th century or the Santuario de Santa María de Conforto founded in the 16th century.

== UNESCO Biosphere Reserve ==
The Turia Valley is part of the Eo River, Oscos and Buron lands Biosphere Reserve. A Biosphere Reserve is an international conservation designation given by UNESCO under its Programme on Man and the Biosphere (MAB). The World Network of Biosphere Reserves is the collection of all 531 biosphere reserves in 105 countries (as of May, 2008). Biosphere reserves are created to promote and demonstrate a balanced relationship between humans and the biosphere. The area included in the Biosphere Reserve covers an area of 158,883 hectares of which 215 km^{2} belong to the area of the Turia Valley.

Agriculture, fish farming and tourism are the principal areas of growth for the region. Although there has been a fall in the primary sector in recent years and an increase in the service sectors as rural tourism, agriculture still remains the largest economic activity of local economy.

The 14 councils which are part of the below Reserve in Asturias and Galicia register a total of 11,408 jobs.

The average income in the area is close to the average regional and national figure.

Micro businesses and family run businesses are very characteristic of the region. Construction, commerce, hotels and rural tourism also account for a high percentage of local business.

Rural tourism is now a growing activity in all the Reserve, at present there are about 170 establishments catered for rural tourism.

== Location ==
The Turia Valley is located on the western border of the Cantabrian Mountains in the northwest of Spain and is divided by two counties: Asturias and Galicia. The valley has two principal towns, A Pontenova (Galicia) and Taramundi (Asturias). The nearest cities are Ribadeo (Galicia) and Lugo (Galicia).
