= Mazonovo =

Coordinates: 43.3569°N 7.1064°W

- Village
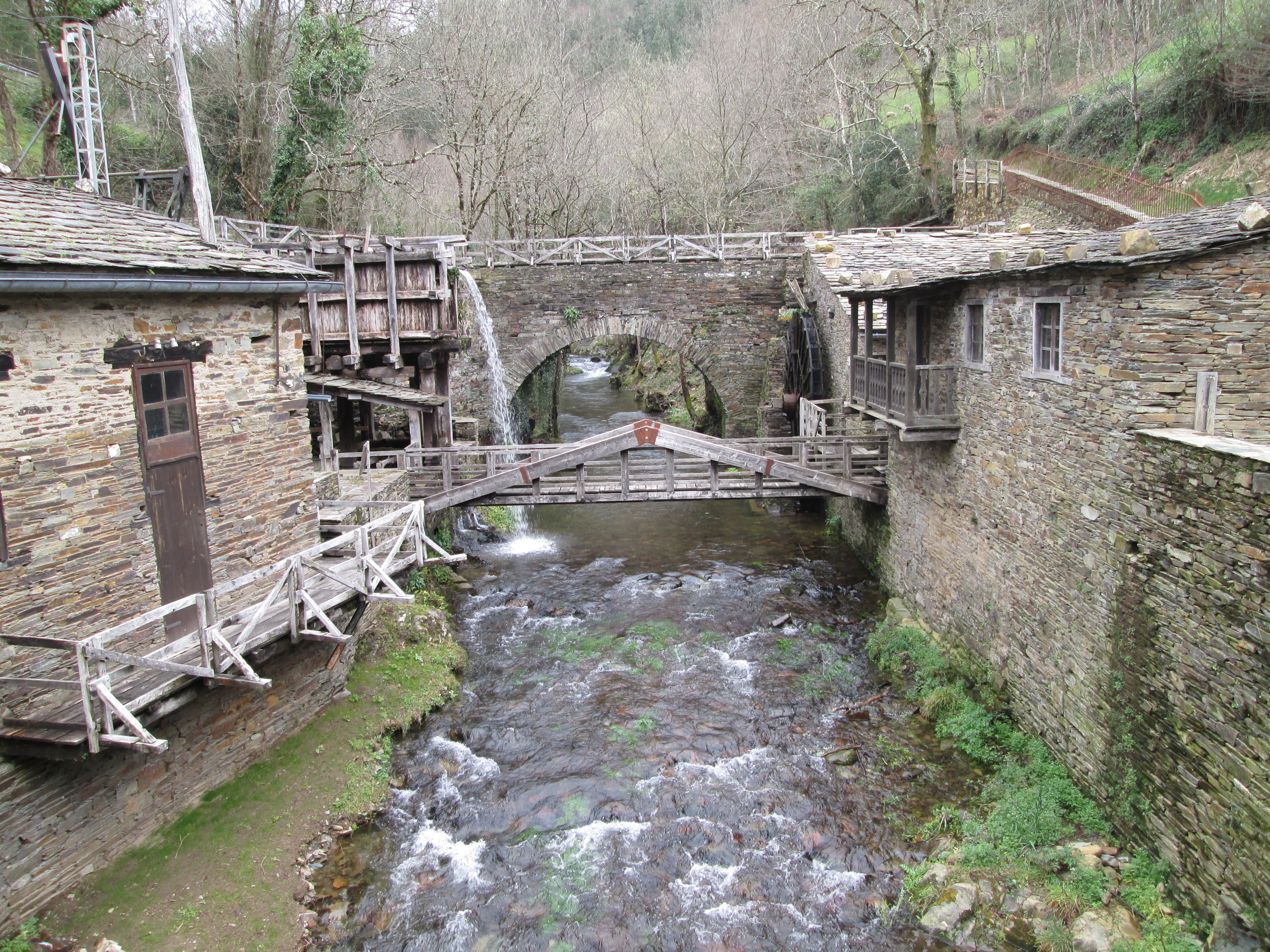
- Entering the museum of Mazonovo
- Interactive map of Mazonovo
- Country: Spain
- Autonomous community: Asturias
- Province: Asturias
- Municipality: Taramundi

Mazonovo (variant: Mazo Novo; translation: "new trip hammer") is a former town and now a museum in the municipality of Taramundi, Asturias, Spain. It is located between the Cabreira River and the Turía River, southeast of the town of Taramundi, northwest of Veigas, and 183 km (114 mi) from Oviedo, the capital of Asturias. According to the census of 2005, the population is four people.

The meaning behind the translated name is derived from the iron products' region of the Oscos-Eo rivers.

The Mazonovo forge stands near the road to Fonsagrada Vegadeo near Santa Eulalia de Oscos. The forge is reached by crossing the Mazonovo River, a tributary of the Agüeira River.

The current owners of the Mazonovo mill date back to the early 19th century. The first mill at Mazonovo was built in 1890. In 1941, a new mill was built on the Cabreira's opposite riverbank to house the mill and powerplant. The original mill, restored in 2003, was then incorporated into the museum. Asturias' director of Biodiversity and Landscape recently gave support to an initiative for natural spawning of trout at Mazonovo.

== Museum ==
Mazonovo
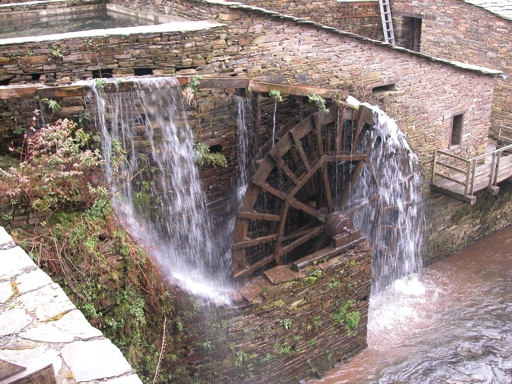
- A working noria at Mazonovo.
- Established: 1998
- Location: Taramundi, Asturias, Spain
- Website: http://www.mazonovo.es/

No longer a town, Mazonovo has been converted into a museum by Conjunto Etnográfico de Mazonovo (Joint Mazonovo Ethnography). Known as "Museo de los Molinos de Mazonovo" (Museum of the Mills of Mazonovo), or "Mazonovo, Museo de los Molinos", it is dedicated to the mills, both water and manual, that were used for grinding cereal. At one time, a maquiladoras, the mills of Mazonovo evolved from prehistoric times until present day. Some of the mills of Mazonovo are reproductions, while others are restored originals. In addition, Mazonovo features utensils used by ancient millwrights.

Building 1 has hand mills from Mesopotamian and Egyptian civilizations dating around 3500 BC. It also displays the interior of the gravity mill whose wheel, 5 m (16 ft) in diameter, is on the outside. There is also Mazonovo's first mill that used a hydraulic press, a medieval mill that visitors can set in motion, a manual Chinese mill, and a hydraulic Brazilian (Monjolo) mill.

Building 2 has a power station for a modern mill running without interruption that can be disassembled to observe the moving parts. It features a glass top and panels with tools. A practical explanation of the operation of the mill's grinding stones is included. A wooden hammer mill, built entirely in oak, is located outside and features a water reservoir.

The Al-Bayda mill dates from circa 7000 BC and was found approximately 60 km (37 mi) from the Dead Sea. Replicas of windmills from different eras and cultures are also displayed.

The museum is not only composed of exhibits, but also allows for visitors to participate in milling activities. Other activities include a workshop to learn how to grind stone.
