= 1948 Vuelta a España =

Race details
- Dates: 13 June – 4 July
- Stages: 20
- Distance: 4,090 km (2,541 mi)
- Winning time: 155h 06' 30"

Results
Jersey awarded to the overall winner	Winner	Bernardo Ruiz (ESP)
	Second	Emilio Rodríguez (ESP)
	Third	Bernardo Capo (ESP)
	Mountains	Bernardo Ruiz (ESP)

The 8th Vuelta a España (Tour of Spain), a long-distance bicycle stage race and one of the three grand tours, was held from 13 June to 4 July 1948. It consisted of 20 stages covering a total of 4,090 km (2,540 mi), and was won by Bernardo Ruiz. Ruiz also won the mountains classification.

== Route ==
List of stages
Stage	Date	Course	Distance	Type	Winner
1	13 June	Madrid to Madrid	14 km (9 mi)	Individual time trial	Bernardo Ruiz (ESP); Julián Berrendero (ESP)
2	13 June	Madrid to Valdepeñas	198 km (123 mi)		Frans Gielen (BEL)
3	14 June	Valdepeñas to Granada	232 km (144 mi)		Dalmacio Langarica (ESP)
4	15 June	Granada to Murcia	285 km (177 mi)		Bernardo Ruiz (ESP)
5	16 June	Murcia to Alicante	230 km (143 mi)		Roberto Vercellone (ITA)
6	17 June	Alicante to Valencia	163 km (101 mi)		Dalmacio Langarica (ESP)
7	19 June	Valencia to Tortosa	201 km (125 mi)		José Pérez Llacer (ESP)
8	20 June	Tortosa to Barcelona	209 km (130 mi)		Senén Mesa (ESP)
9	21 June	Barcelona to Lleida	203 km (126 mi)		Miguel Gual (ESP)
10	22 June	Lleida to Zaragoza	144 km (89 mi)		Jean Lesage (BEL)
11	23 June	Zaragoza to San Sebastián	276 km (171 mi)		Dalmacio Langarica (ESP)
12	25 June	San Sebastián to Bilbao	259 km (161 mi)		Bernardo Ruiz (ESP)
13	26 June	Bilbao to Santander	212 km (132 mi)		Senén Mesa (ESP)
14	27 June	Santander to Gijón	225 km (140 mi)		Senén Mesa (ESP)
15	28 June	Gijón to Ribadeo	200 km (124 mi)		Jean Lesage (BEL)
16	29 June	Ribadeo to A Coruña	156 km (97 mi)		Miguel Gual (ESP)
17	1 July	A Coruña to Ourense	156 km (97 mi)		Miguel Gual (ESP)
18	2 July	Ourense to León	276 km (171 mi)		Jean Lesage (BEL)
19	3 July	León to Segovia	269 km (167 mi)		Miguel Gual (ESP)
20	4 July	Segovia to Madrid	100 km (62 mi)		Víctor Ruiz (ESP)
	Total		4,090 km (2,541 mi)		

== Results ==
=== Final General Classification ===
Rank	Rider	Team	Time
1	(Spain) Bernardo Ruiz		155h 06' 30"
2	(Spain) Emilio Rodríguez		+ 9' 07"
3	(Spain) Bernardo Capo		+ 20' 45"
4	(Spain) Dalmacio Langarica		+ 22' 19"
5	(Spain) Senen Mesa		+ 24' 57"
6	(Spain) Manuel Costa		+ 25' 52"
7	(Spain) Manolo Rodríguez		+ 33' 25"
8	(Spain) José Pérez Llácer		+ 39' 37"
9	(Spain) Miguel Gual		+ 43' 35"
10	(France) Antoine Giauna		+ 1h 07' 38"
11	(Spain) Victorio Ruiz		
12	(Belgium) Jean Lesage		
13	(Spain) Juan Gimeno		
14	(Spain) Ricardo Ferrandiz		
15	(Spain) José Serra		
16	(Spain) Agustin Miro		
17	(Spain) Antonio Gelabert		
18	(Spain) Pedro Font		
19	(Belgium) Jean Breur		
20	(Spain) Senen Blanco		
21	(Spain) Jesús Loroño		
22	(Spain) Andres Moran		
23	(Italy) Natalino Arata		
24	(Spain) Joaquim Jimenez		
25	(Belgium) Frans Gielen		
