= 1948 Vuelta a España, Stage 11 to Stage 20 =

Cycling race stages

The 1948 Vuelta a España was the 8th edition of Vuelta a España, one of cycling's Grand Tours. The Tour began in Madrid with a prologue individual time trial on 13 June and Stage 11 occurred on 23 June with a stage from Zaragoza. The race finished in Madrid on 4 July.

== Stage 11 ==
23 June 1948 - Zaragoza to San Sebastián, 276 km (171.5 mi)

Stage 11 result

Rank	Rider	Team	Time
1	Dalmacio Langarica (ESP)	Insecticidas ZZ	12h 23' 04"
2	Miguel Gual (ESP)	Veloz Sport Balear	s.t.
3	Jean Lesage (BEL)	Bicicletas Cil	s.t.
4	Bernardo Ruiz (ESP)	U.D. Sans-Portaminas Alas Color	s.t.
5	Joaquín Olmos (ESP)	Casa Galindo	s.t.
6	Senén Mesa (ESP)	Bicicletas Gaitan	s.t.
7	Emilio Rodríguez (ESP)	U.D. Sans-Portaminas Alas Color	s.t.
8	Félix Vidaurreta (ESP)	Insecticidas ZZ	s.t.
9	Victorio Ruiz (ESP)	Agris Radio	s.t.
10	Julián Berrendero (ESP)	Casa Galindo	s.t.

General classification after Stage 11

Rank	Rider	Team	Time
1	Dalmacio Langarica (ESP)	Insecticidas ZZ	80h 33' 11"
2	Bernardo Ruiz (ESP)	U.D. Sans-Portaminas Alas Color	+ 2' 52"
3	Senén Mesa (ESP)	Bicicletas Gaitan	+ 3' 59"
4	Manuel Costa (ESP)	Casa Galindo	+ 5' 15"
5	Bernardo Capó (ESP)	Veloz Sport Balear	+ 8' 56"
6	Emilio Rodríguez (ESP)	U.D. Sans-Portaminas Alas Color	+ 9' 17"
7	José Pérez (ESP)	U.D. Sans-Portaminas Alas Color	+ 16' 02"
8	José Serra (ESP)	U.D. Sans-Portaminas Alas Color	+ 16' 14"
9	Ricardo Ferrandiz (ESP)	U.D. Sans-Portaminas Alas Color	+ 16' 39"
10	Manuel Rodríguez (ESP)	Agris Radio	+ 16' 45"

== Stage 12 ==
25 June 1948 - San Sebastián to Bilbao, 259 km (160.9 mi)

Stage 12 result

Rank	Rider	Team	Time
1	Bernardo Ruiz (ESP)	U.D. Sans-Portaminas Alas Color	9h 11' 24"
2	Emilio Rodríguez (ESP)	U.D. Sans-Portaminas Alas Color	+ 2"
3	Victorio Ruiz (ESP)	Agris Radio	+ 3' 52"
4	Manuel Rodríguez (ESP)	Agris Radio	s.t.
5	Dalmacio Langarica (ESP)	Insecticidas ZZ	s.t.
6	José Pérez (ESP)	U.D. Sans-Portaminas Alas Color	+ 7' 48"
7	Bernardo Capó (ESP)	Veloz Sport Balear	+ 11' 45"
8	Félix Vidaurreta (ESP)	Insecticidas ZZ	+ 13' 00"
9	Manuel Costa (ESP)	Casa Galindo	s.t.
10	Miguel Gual (ESP)	Veloz Sport Balear	+ 20' 24"

General classification after Stage 12

Rank	Rider	Team	Time
1	Bernardo Ruiz (ESP)	U.D. Sans-Portaminas Alas Color	89h 45' 27"
2	Dalmacio Langarica (ESP)	Insecticidas ZZ	+ 2' 00"
3	Emilio Rodríguez (ESP)	U.D. Sans-Portaminas Alas Color	+ 8' 25"
4	Manuel Costa (ESP)	Casa Galindo	+ 17' 23"
5	Manuel Rodríguez (ESP)	Agris Radio	+ 19' 45"
6	Bernardo Capó (ESP)	Veloz Sport Balear	+ 19' 49"
7	José Pérez (ESP)	U.D. Sans-Portaminas Alas Color	+ 20' 58"
8	Senén Mesa (ESP)	Bicicletas Gaitan	+ 29' 15"
9	Victorio Ruiz (ESP)	Agris Radio	+ 34' 43"
10	Miguel Gual (ESP)	Veloz Sport Balear	+ 38' 06"

== Stage 13 ==
26 June 1948 - Bilbao to Santander, 212 km (132 mi)

Stage 13 result

Rank	Rider	Team	Time
1	Senén Mesa (ESP)	Bicicletas Gaitan	8h 21' 00"
2	Bernardo Capó (ESP)	Veloz Sport Balear	+ 2' 14"
3	Julián Berrendero (ESP)	Casa Galindo	+ 2' 31"
4	Bernardo Ruiz (ESP)	U.D. Sans-Portaminas Alas Color	+ 4' 41"
5	Jesús Loroño (ESP)	Insecticidas ZZ	s.t.
6	Emilio Rodríguez (ESP)	U.D. Sans-Portaminas Alas Color	+ 4' 59"
7	Antoine Giauna (FRA)	Hojas Afeitar Iberia	+ 9' 35"
8	Antonio Gelabert (ESP)	Veloz Sport Balear	+ 10' 31"
9	Manuel Rodríguez (ESP)	Agris Radio	s.t.
10	José Pérez (ESP)	U.D. Sans-Portaminas Alas Color	+ 12' 24"

General classification after Stage 13

Rank	Rider	Team	Time
1	Bernardo Ruiz (ESP)	U.D. Sans-Portaminas Alas Color	98h 11' 08"
2	Emilio Rodríguez (ESP)	U.D. Sans-Portaminas Alas Color	+ 7' 43"
3	Dalmacio Langarica (ESP)	Insecticidas ZZ	+ 10' 29"
4	Bernardo Capó (ESP)	Veloz Sport Balear	+ 17' 22"
5	Senén Mesa (ESP)	Bicicletas Gaitan	+ 23' 36"
6	Manuel Rodríguez (ESP)	Agris Radio	+ 25' 45"
7	Manuel Costa (ESP)	Casa Galindo	+ 25' 52"
8	José Pérez (ESP)	U.D. Sans-Portaminas Alas Color	+ 27' 41"
9	Julián Berrendero (ESP)	Casa Galindo	+ 44' 49"
10	Miguel Gual (ESP)	Veloz Sport Balear	+ 46' 35"

== Stage 14 ==
27 June 1948 - Santander to Gijón, 170 km (110 mi)

Stage 14 result

Rank	Rider	Team	Time
1	Senén Mesa (ESP)	Bicicletas Gaitan	7h 08' 55"
2	Victorio Ruiz (ESP)	Agris Radio	+ 3' 35"
3	Dalmacio Langarica (ESP)	Insecticidas ZZ	+ 5' 11"
4	Julián Berrendero (ESP)	Casa Galindo	+ 5' 55"
5	Jean Lesage (BEL)	Bicicletas Cil	+ 6' 25"
6	Antoine Giauna (FRA)	Hojas Afeitar Iberia	s.t.
7	Emilio Rodríguez (ESP)	U.D. Sans-Portaminas Alas Color	s.t.
8	Andrés Morán (ESP)	Bicicletas Gaitan	s.t.
9	Bernardo Ruiz (ESP)	U.D. Sans-Portaminas Alas Color	s.t.
10	Manuel Costa (ESP)	Casa Galindo	s.t.

General classification after Stage 14

Rank	Rider	Team	Time
1	Bernardo Ruiz (ESP)	U.D. Sans-Portaminas Alas Color	105h 20' 12"
2	Emilio Rodríguez (ESP)	U.D. Sans-Portaminas Alas Color	+ 13' 43"
3	Dalmacio Langarica (ESP)	Insecticidas ZZ	+ 15' 41"
4	Senén Mesa (ESP)	Bicicletas Gaitan	+ 23' 27"
5	Bernardo Capó (ESP)	Veloz Sport Balear	+ 23' 53"
6	Manuel Costa (ESP)	Casa Galindo	+ 24' 52"
7	Manuel Rodríguez (ESP)	Agris Radio	+ 33' 16"
8	José Pérez (ESP)	U.D. Sans-Portaminas Alas Color	+ 44' 38"
9	Julián Berrendero (ESP)	Casa Galindo	+ 50' 35"
10	Miguel Gual (ESP)	Veloz Sport Balear	+ 52' 35"

== Stage 15 ==
28 June 1948 - Gijón to Ribadeo, 200 km (120 mi)

== Stage 16 ==
29 June 1948 - Ribadeo to A Coruña, 156 km (97 mi)

Stage 16 result

Rank	Rider	Team	Time
1	Miguel Gual (ESP)	Veloz Sport Balear	5h 28' 45"
2	José Pérez (ESP)	U.D. Sans-Portaminas Alas Color	s.t.
3	Jean Lesage (BEL)	Bicicletas Cil	s.t.
4	Antoine Giauna (FRA)	Hojas Afeitar Iberia	s.t.
5	Dalmacio Langarica (ESP)	Insecticidas ZZ	s.t.
6	Victorio Ruiz (ESP)	Agris Radio	s.t.
7	Emilio Rodríguez (ESP)	U.D. Sans-Portaminas Alas Color	+ 25"

General classification after Stage 16

Rank	Rider	Team	Time
1	Bernardo Ruiz (ESP)	U.D. Sans-Portaminas Alas Color	112h 56' 42"
2	Emilio Rodríguez (ESP)	U.D. Sans-Portaminas Alas Color	+ 7' 43"
3	Dalmacio Langarica (ESP)	Insecticidas ZZ	+ 9' 41"
4	Senén Mesa (ESP)	Bicicletas Gaitan	+ 17' 27"
5	Bernardo Capó (ESP)	Veloz Sport Balear	+ 19' 38"
6	Manuel Costa (ESP)	Casa Galindo	+ 25' 52"
7	Manuel Rodríguez (ESP)	Agris Radio	+ 27' 16"
8	José Pérez (ESP)	U.D. Sans-Portaminas Alas Color	+ 39' 38"
9	Julián Berrendero (ESP)	Casa Galindo	+ 44' 59"
10	Miguel Gual (ESP)	Veloz Sport Balear	+ 46' 35"

== Stage 17 ==
1 July 1948 - A Coruña to Ourense, 156 km (97 mi)

Stage 17 result

Rank	Rider	Team	Time
1	Miguel Gual (ESP)	Veloz Sport Balear	8h 46' 49"
2	Antoine Giauna (FRA)	Hojas Afeitar Iberia	s.t.
3	Bernardo Ruiz (ESP)	U.D. Sans-Portaminas Alas Color	s.t.
4	Julián Berrendero (ESP)	Casa Galindo	s.t.
5	Manuel Costa (ESP)	Casa Galindo	s.t.
6	José Pérez (ESP)	U.D. Sans-Portaminas Alas Color	+ 51"
7	Emilio Rodríguez (ESP)	U.D. Sans-Portaminas Alas Color	s.t.
8	Antonio Gelabert (ESP)	Veloz Sport Balear	s.t.
9	Bernardo Capó (ESP)	Veloz Sport Balear	+ 1' 17"
10	Ricardo Ferrandiz (ESP)	U.D. Sans-Portaminas Alas Color	+ 1' 35"

General classification after Stage 17

Rank	Rider	Team	Time
1	Bernardo Ruiz (ESP)	U.D. Sans-Portaminas Alas Color	127h 12' 16"
2	Emilio Rodríguez (ESP)	U.D. Sans-Portaminas Alas Color	+ 5' 04"
3	Bernardo Capó (ESP)	Veloz Sport Balear	+ 20' 45"
4	Dalmacio Langarica (ESP)	Insecticidas ZZ	+ 23' 19"
5	Senén Mesa (ESP)	Bicicletas Gaitan	+ 24' 37"
6	Manuel Costa (ESP)	Casa Galindo	+ 25' 52"
7	Manuel Rodríguez (ESP)	Agris Radio	s.t.
8	José Pérez (ESP)	U.D. Sans-Portaminas Alas Color	+ 39' 34"
9	Miguel Gual (ESP)	Veloz Sport Balear	+ 44' 35"
10	Julián Berrendero (ESP)	Casa Galindo	+ 48' 29"

== Stage 18 ==
2 July 1948 - Ourense to León, 135.5 km (84.2 mi)

Stage 18 result

Rank	Rider	Team	Time
1	Jean Lesage (BEL)	Bicicletas Cil	12h 04' 47"
2	Miguel Gual (ESP)	Veloz Sport Balear	s.t.
3	Jean Bogaerts (BEL)	Bicicletas Cil	s.t.
4	José Pérez (ESP)	U.D. Sans-Portaminas Alas Color	s.t.
5	Victorio Ruiz (ESP)	Agris Radio	s.t.
6	Manuel Costa (ESP)	Casa Galindo	s.t.
7	Agustín Miró (ESP)	Casa Galindo	s.t.
8	Jean Breuer (BEL)	Bicicletas Cil	s.t.
9	Antoine Giauna (FRA)	Hojas Afeitar Iberia	s.t.
10	Natalino Arata (ITA)	Pedal Notario	s.t.

General classification after Stage 18

Rank	Rider	Team	Time
1	Bernardo Ruiz (ESP)	U.D. Sans-Portaminas Alas Color	139h 17' 03"
2	Emilio Rodríguez (ESP)	U.D. Sans-Portaminas Alas Color	+ 9' 07"
3	Bernardo Capó (ESP)	Veloz Sport Balear	+ 10' 40"
4	Dalmacio Langarica (ESP)	Insecticidas ZZ	+ 23' 19"
5	Senén Mesa (ESP)	Bicicletas Gaitan	+ 24' 37"
6	Manuel Costa (ESP)	Casa Galindo	+ 25' 52"
7	Manuel Rodríguez (ESP)	Agris Radio	+ 28' 26"
8	José Pérez (ESP)	U.D. Sans-Portaminas Alas Color	+ 39' 37"
9	Miguel Gual (ESP)	Veloz Sport Balear	+ 44' 35"
10	Antoine Giauna (FRA)	Hojas Afeitar Iberia	+ 56' 36"

== Stage 19 ==
3 July 1948 - León to Segovia, 185.5 km (115.3 mi)

Stage 19 result

Rank	Rider	Team	Time
1	Miguel Gual (ESP)	Veloz Sport Balear	12h 48' 05"
2	Jean Lesage (BEL)	Bicicletas Cil	s.t.
3	Emilio Rodríguez (ESP)	U.D. Sans-Portaminas Alas Color	s.t.
4	José Pérez (ESP)	U.D. Sans-Portaminas Alas Color	s.t.
5	Manuel Costa (ESP)	Casa Galindo	s.t.
6	Victorio Ruiz (ESP)	Agris Radio	s.t.
7	Agustín Miró (ESP)	Casa Galindo	s.t.
8	Manuel Rodríguez (ESP)	Agris Radio	s.t.
9	Bernardo Ruiz (ESP)	U.D. Sans-Portaminas Alas Color	s.t.
10	Bernardo Capó (ESP)	Veloz Sport Balear	s.t.

General classification after Stage 19

Rank	Rider	Team	Time
1	Bernardo Ruiz (ESP)	U.D. Sans-Portaminas Alas Color	152h 05' 08"
2	Emilio Rodríguez (ESP)	U.D. Sans-Portaminas Alas Color	+ 9' 07"
3	Bernardo Capó (ESP)	Veloz Sport Balear	+ 20' 45"
4	Dalmacio Langarica (ESP)	Insecticidas ZZ	+ 23' 19"
5	Senén Mesa (ESP)	Bicicletas Gaitan	+ 24' 57"
6	Manuel Costa (ESP)	Casa Galindo	+ 25' 52"
7	Manuel Rodríguez (ESP)	Agris Radio	+ 30' 26"
8	José Pérez (ESP)	U.D. Sans-Portaminas Alas Color	+ 39' 37"
9	Miguel Gual (ESP)	Veloz Sport Balear	+ 43' 35"
10	Antoine Giauna (FRA)	Hojas Afeitar Iberia	+ 57' 05"

== Stage 20 ==
4 July 1948 - Segovia to Madrid, 100 km (62 mi)

Stage 20 result

Rank	Rider	Team	Time
1	Victorio Ruiz (ESP)	Agris Radio	2h 58' 45"
2	Dalmacio Langarica (ESP)	Insecticidas ZZ	+ 2' 37"
3	Antonio Gelabert (ESP)	Veloz Sport Balear	s.t.
4	Miguel Gual (ESP)	Veloz Sport Balear	s.t.
5	Agustín Miró (ESP)	Casa Galindo	s.t.
6	Emilio Rodríguez (ESP)	U.D. Sans-Portaminas Alas Color	s.t.
7	Senén Mesa (ESP)	Bicicletas Gaitan	s.t.
8	José Serra (ESP)	U.D. Sans-Portaminas Alas Color	s.t.
9	Manuel Costa (ESP)	Casa Galindo	s.t.
10	Bernardo Capó (ESP)	Veloz Sport Balear	s.t.

General classification after Stage 20

Rank	Rider	Team	Time
1	Bernardo Ruiz (ESP)	U.D. Sans-Portaminas Alas Color	155h 06' 30"
2	Emilio Rodríguez (ESP)	U.D. Sans-Portaminas Alas Color	+ 9' 07"
3	Bernardo Capó (ESP)	Veloz Sport Balear	+ 20' 45"
4	Dalmacio Langarica (ESP)	Insecticidas ZZ	+ 22' 19"
5	Senén Mesa (ESP)	Bicicletas Gaitan	+ 24' 57"
6	Manuel Costa (ESP)	Casa Galindo	+ 25' 52"
7	Manuel Rodríguez (ESP)	Agris Radio	+ 33' 25"
8	José Pérez (ESP)	U.D. Sans-Portaminas Alas Color	+ 39' 37"
9	Miguel Gual (ESP)	Veloz Sport Balear	+ 43' 35"
10	Antoine Giauna (FRA)	Hojas Afeitar Iberia	+ 1h 07' 38"
