= Taramundi =

- Municipality
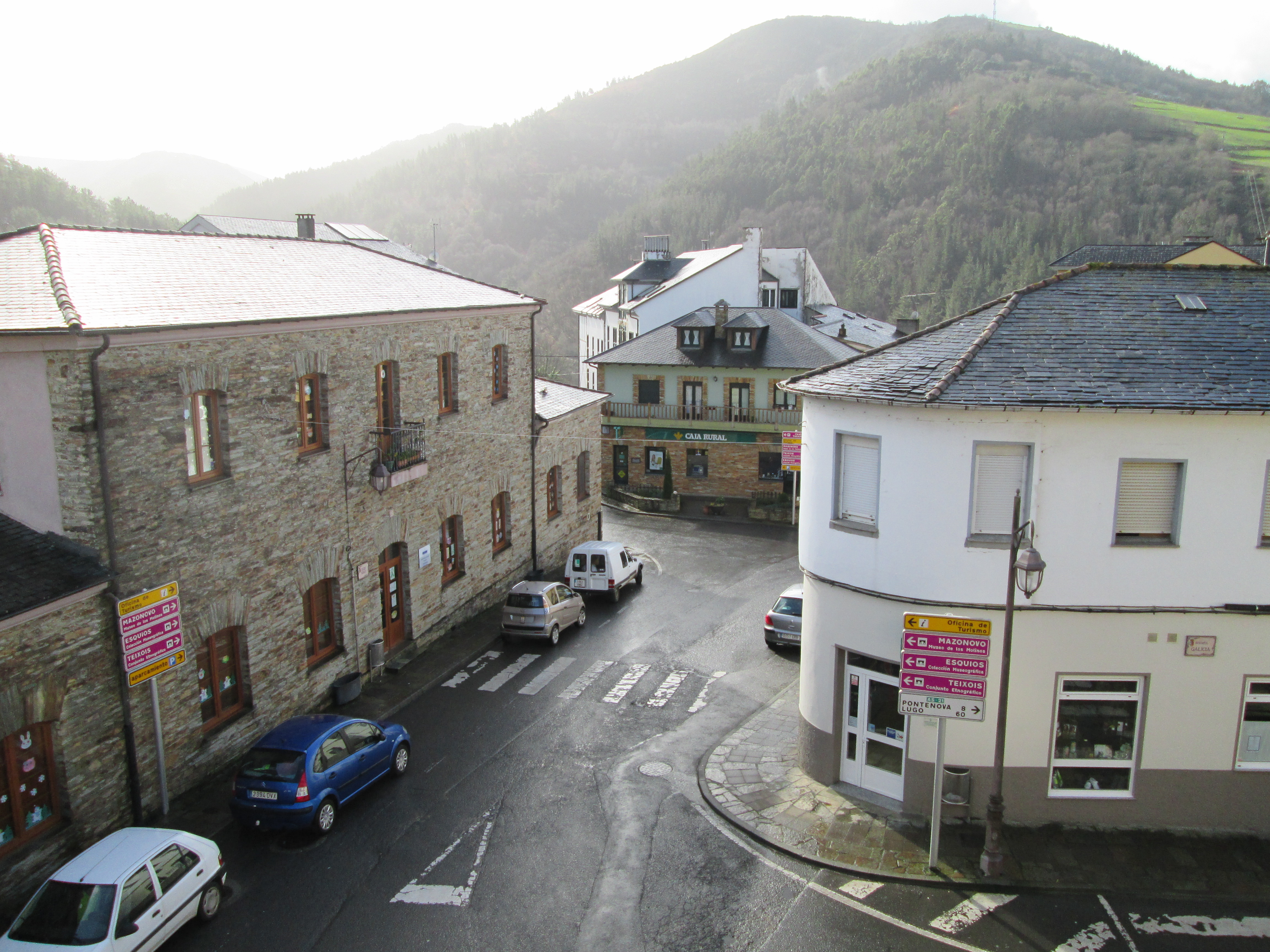

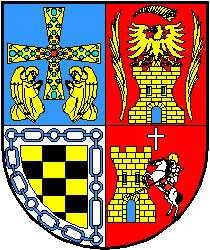
- Coat of arms

- Location in Spain
- Coordinates: 43°21.7′N 7°6.5′W
- Country: Spain
- Autonomous community: Asturias
- Province: Asturias
- Comarca: Eo-Navia
- Capital: Taramundi

Government
  - Alcalde: Eduardo Lastra Pérez (PSOE)

Area
  - Total: 82.16 km^{2} (31.72 sq mi)
- Highest elevation: 1,033 m (3,389 ft)

Population (2025-01-01)
  - Total: 545
  - Density: 6.63/km^{2} (17.2/sq mi)
- Demonym: taramundés
- Time zone: UTC+1 (CET)
  - Summer (DST): UTC+2 (CEST)
- Postal code: 33775
- Website: Official website

Taramundi is a municipality in the Principality of Asturias, Spain. It neighbors on the north side with San Tirso de Abres and Vegadeo, on the east side with Villanueva de Oscos and Vegadeo, on the south side with Santa Eulalia de Oscos and A Pontenova (Lugo), and on the west side with Lugo.

It is one of Eonavian speaking councils of Asturias.

== Population ==
From: INE Archiv

== Parishes ==
- Bres
- Ouría
- Taramundi
- Veigas

== Taramundi and the Turia Valley ==
Taramundi is part of the Turía Valley or “Valle del Turía”, a small valley on the western border of the Cantabrian Mountains in the northwest of Spain which is close to beaches and is divided by two counties: Asturias and Galicia. It consists of an area of 90 km^{2} (35 sq mi), 3910 inhabitants and is 200 m (660 ft) above sea level. There are two main towns are A Pontenova (Galicia) and Taramundi (Asturias).

The climate in the region is pleasant throughout the year. As with the rest of northern Spain, the climate is more variable than the southern parts of Spain and is characterised by an Atlantic climate. The average temperature in summer is usually around 26 °C (79 °F). The average temperature in winter is 8 °C (46 °F); 12 °C (54 °F) in the day and 4 °C (39 °F) at night.

The Turía River gives its name to the valley. The valley is surrounded by hills and mountains, including, Sierra de Piedrafita (900 m, 3,000 ft), Sierra de Ouroso (1,033 m, 3,389 ft), Sierras de Dendin (900 m, 3,000 ft), Sierra de Teixedais (900 m, 3,000 ft) and Sierra de Eirua (700 m, 2,300 ft).

== UNESCO Biosphere Reserve ==
Also Taramundi is part of the Eo River, Oscos and Buron lands Biosphere Reserve. A Biosphere Reserve is an international conservation designation given by UNESCO under its Programme on Man and the Biosphere (MAB). The World Network of Biosphere Reserves is the collection of all 531 biosphere reserves in 105 countries (as of May, 2008). Biosphere reserves are created to promote and demonstrate a balanced relationship between humans and the biosphere. The area included in the Biosphere Reserve occupies a surface of 158,883 hectares (392,610 acres) of which 215 km^{2} (83 sq mi) belongs to the area of the Turía Valley.

Agriculture, fish farming and tourism are the principal areas of growth for the region. Although there has been a fall in the primary sector in recent years and an increase in the service sectors as rural tourism, agriculture still remains the largest economical activity of local economy.

Micro businesses and family run businesses are very characteristic of the region. Construction, commerce, hotels and rural tourism also account for high percentage of local business.

Rural tourism is now a growing activity in all the Reserve, at present there are about 170 establishments catered for rural tourism.

== Turía River ==
The Río Turía ("Turia River") is a small river which rises in the town of Taramundi (Asturias) and drains into the Eo River in the town of A Pontenova (Lugo).

The Turia river gives its name to the Turia Valley or “Valle del Turía” that crosses horizontally before emptying into the Eo river. The Turia river is fed by numerous streams and creeks from the mountains that limit the valley, and is part of the Eo UNESCO biosphere reserve.

While the river is born in Asturias, the bulk of his wealth is found in Lugo (Galicia).

The Turia river is a source of industry and its waters are used to generate socio-economic activities based on ancient traditions such as Navajeros crafts and textiles, as well as the primary industry of salmon farming in A Pontenova (Lugo).

- Source: Near as As Veigas, Taramundi (Asturias).
- Ending: Río Eo, Puente Nuevo (Lugo).
- Distance: 9 km (5.6 mi).
- Altitude: 800 to 250 m (2,620 to 820 ft).
- Tributary rivers: Small local creeks and streams.
- Runs: Asturias: As Veigas, Mazonovo, Taramundi, A Garda y Mousende. Lugo: Conforto y A Pontenova.

== Gallery ==
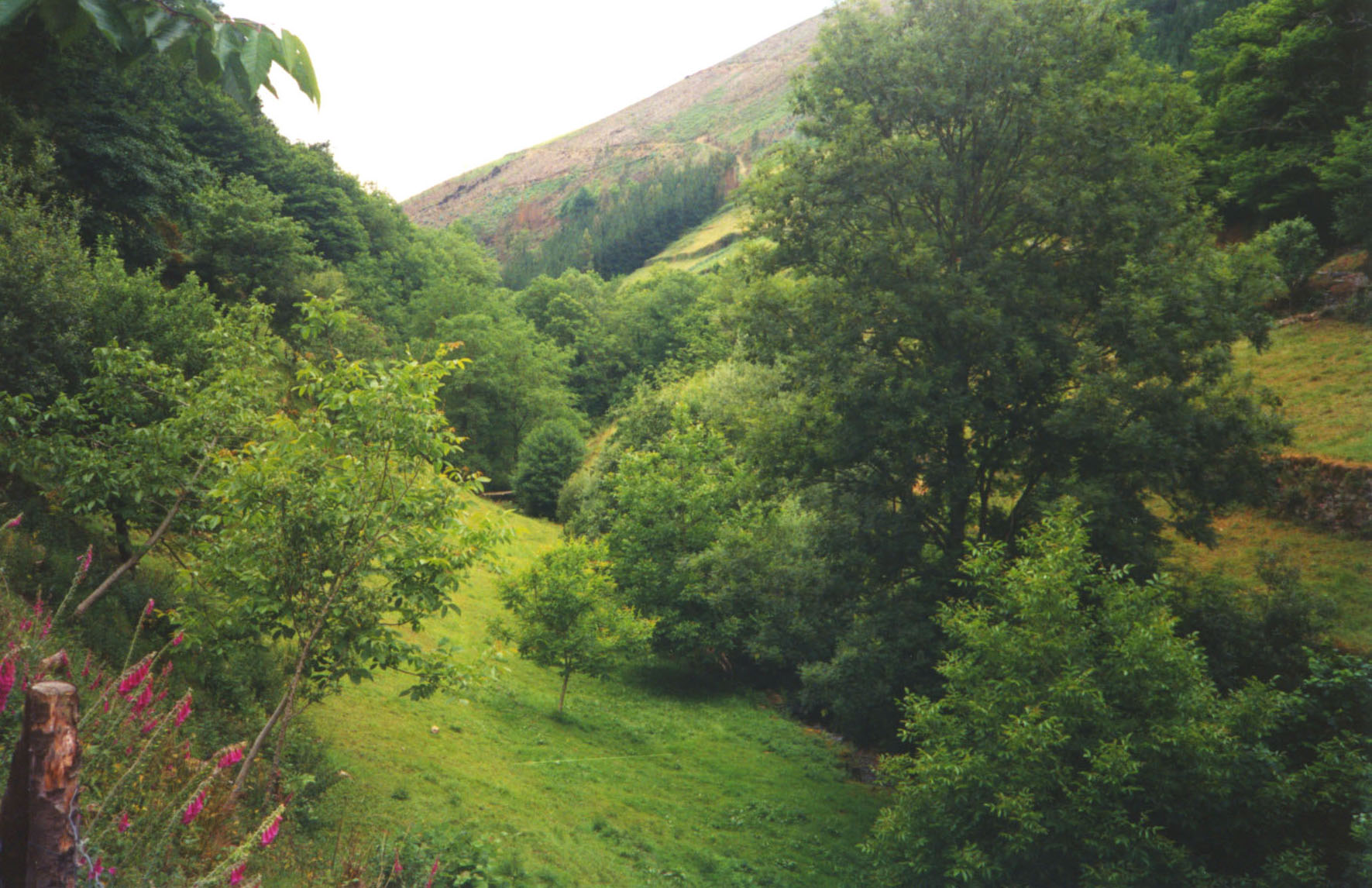
View of Taramundi

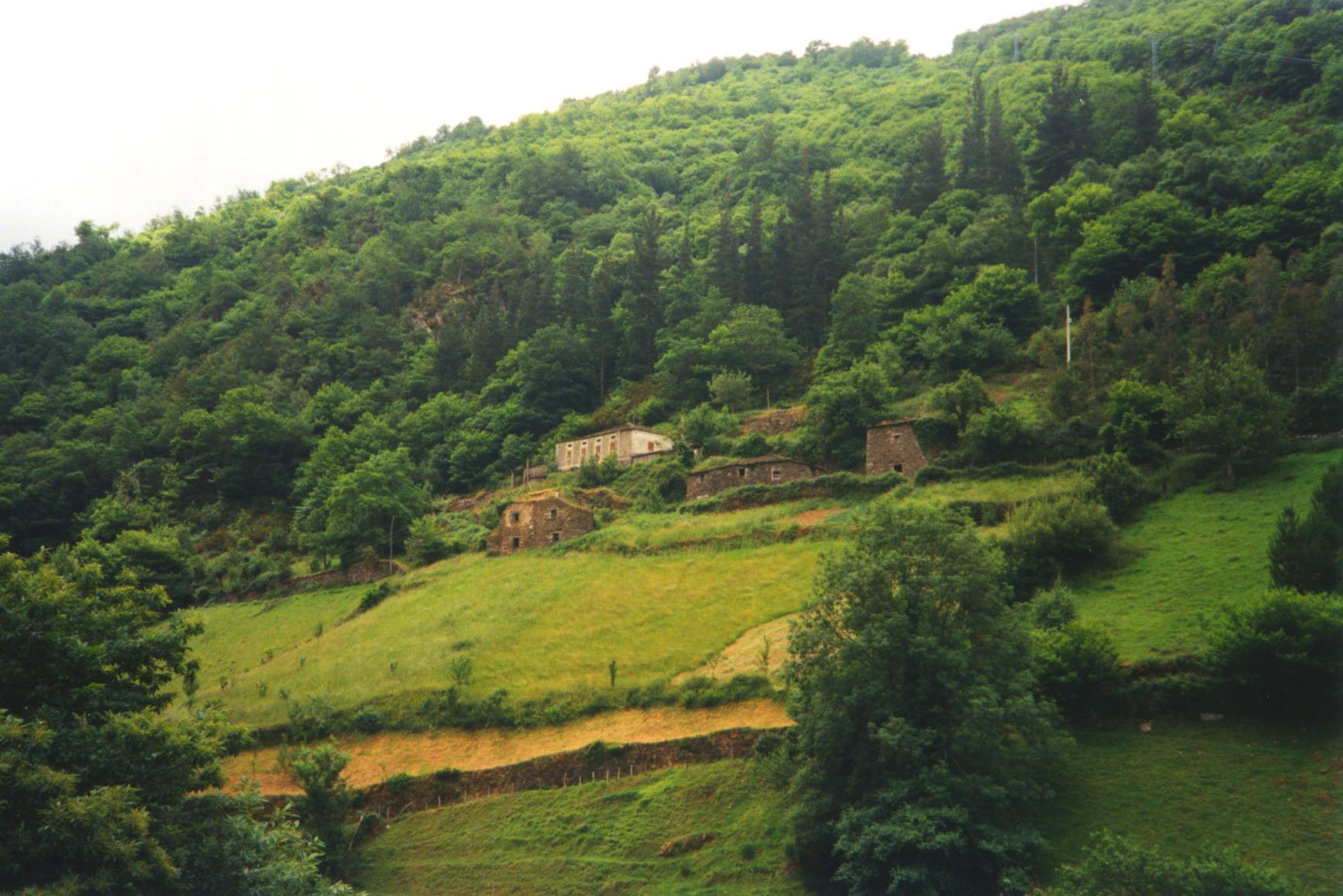
View of Taramundi

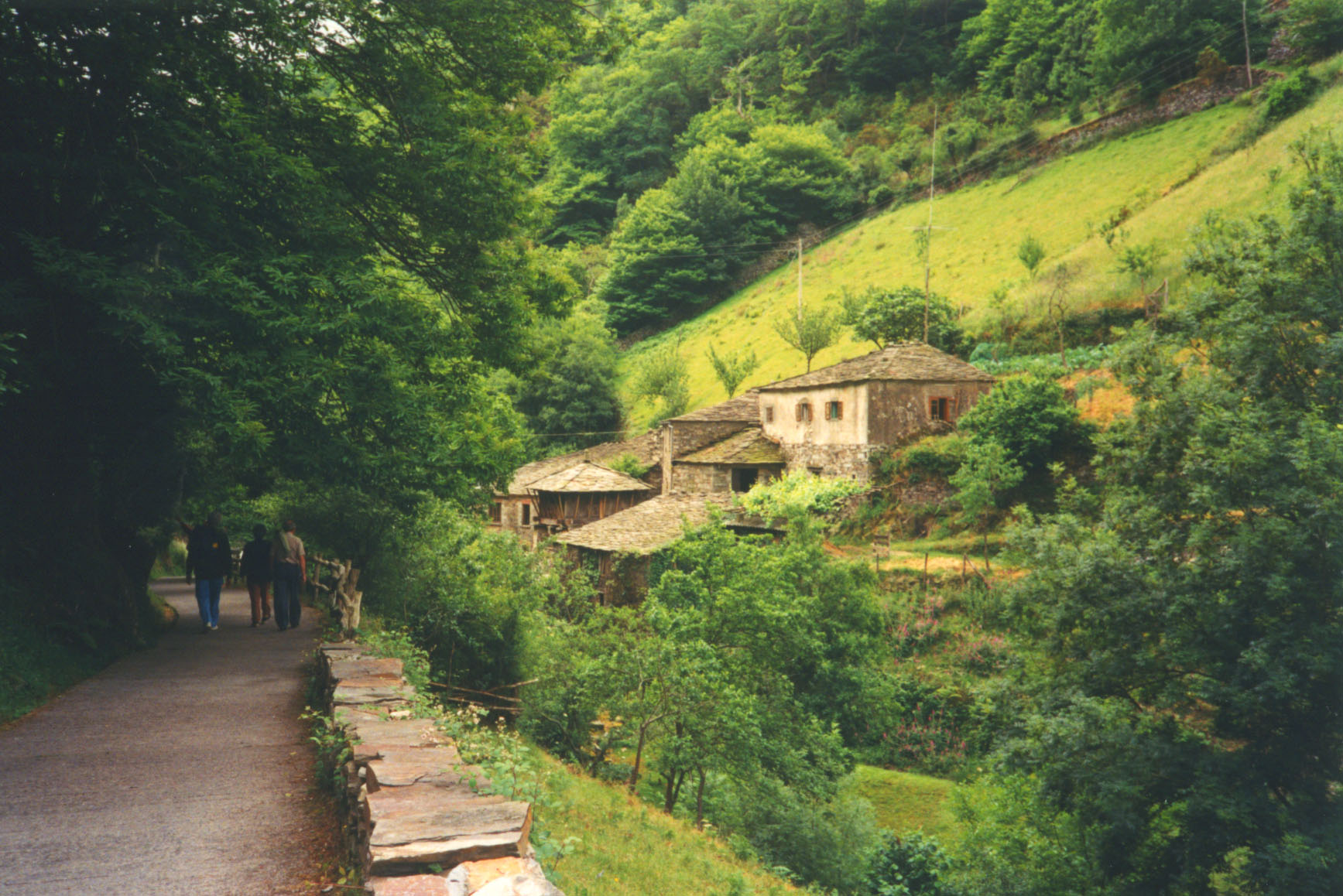
Os Teixois Village

== See also ==
- List of municipalities in Asturias

== Links ==
- Infoasturias.com Electronic tourism brochure edited by the Asturias Council Tourism Department.
