= A Mariña Oriental =

Coordinates: 43.4583°N 7.18333°W

- Comarca
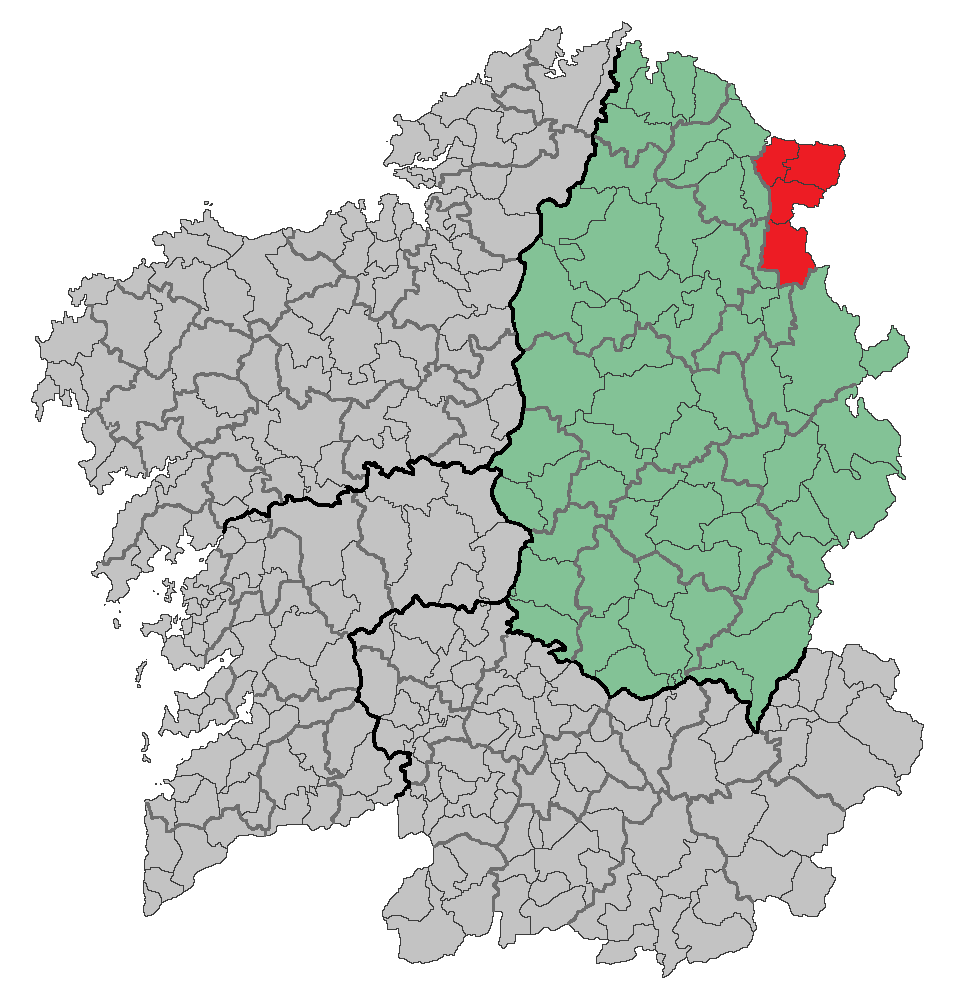
- Country: Spain
- Autonomous community: Galicia
- Province: Lugo
- Capital: Ribadeo
- Municipalities: List: Barreiros, A Pontenova, Ribadeo, Trabada

Population (2019)
  - Total: 28,955
- Time zone: UTC+1 (CET)
  - Summer (DST): UTC+2 (CEST)

A Mariña Oriental is a comarca in the Galician Province of Lugo. The overall population of this local region is 28,955 (2019).

== Municipalities ==
Barreiros, A Pontenova, Ribadeo and Trabada.
