= 1948 Vuelta a España, Stage 1 to Stage 10 =

Cycling race stages

The 1948 Vuelta a España was the 8th edition of Vuelta a España, one of cycling's Grand Tours. The Tour began in Madrid with a prologue individual time trial on 13 June and Stage 10 occurred on 22 June with a stage to Zaragoza. The race finished in Madrid on 4 July.

== Stage 1 ==
13 June 1948 - Madrid to Madrid, 14 km (8.7 mi) (ITT)

Stage 1 result and general classification after Stage 1

Rank	Rider	Team	Time
1	Julián Berrendero (ESP)	Casa Galindo	20' 46"
2	Bernardo Ruiz (ESP)	U.D. Sans-Portaminas Alas Color	s.t.
3	Joaquín Olmos (ESP)	Casa Galindo	s.t.
4	José Pérez (ESP)	U.D. Sans-Portaminas Alas Color	s.t.
5	Ricardo Ferrandiz (ESP)	U.D. Sans-Portaminas Alas Color	s.t.
6	Manuel Costa (ESP)	Casa Galindo	+ 1"
7	Agustín Miró (ESP)	Casa Galindo	s.t.
8	Juan Gimeno (ESP)	Casa Galindo	s.t.
9	José Serra (ESP)	U.D. Sans-Portaminas Alas Color	s.t.
10	Jean Lesage (BEL)	Bicicletas Cil	+ 5"

== Stage 2 ==
13 June 1948 - Madrid to Valdepeñas, 198 km (123.0 mi)

Stage 2 result

Rank	Rider	Team	Time
1	Frans Gielen (BEL)	Bicicletas Cil	5h 53' 36"
2	Dalmacio Langarica (ESP)	Insecticidas ZZ	+ 1' 00"
3	Jean Lesage (BEL)	Bicicletas Cil	s.t.
4	Miguel Fombellida (ESP)	Hojas Afeitar Iberia	s.t.
5	Jean Breuer (BEL)	Bicicletas Cil	s.t.
6	Jean Bogaerts (BEL)	Bicicletas Cil	s.t.
7	Daniel Taillieu (BEL)	Bicicletas Cil	s.t.
8	Félix Adriano (ITA)	Hojas Afeitar Iberia	s.t.
9	Antoine Giauna (FRA)	Hojas Afeitar Iberia	s.t.
10	Celestino Camilla (ITA)	Pedal Notario	s.t.

General classification after Stage 2

Rank	Rider	Team	Time
1	Frans Gielen (BEL)	Bicicletas Cil	6h 14' 27"
2	Julián Berrendero (ESP)	Casa Galindo	+ 25"
3	Bernardo Ruiz (ESP)	U.D. Sans-Portaminas Alas Color	s.t.
4	Joaquín Olmos (ESP)	Casa Galindo	+ 55"
5	José Pérez (ESP)	U.D. Sans-Portaminas Alas Color	s.t.
6	Ricardo Ferrandiz (ESP)	U.D. Sans-Portaminas Alas Color	s.t.
7	Manuel Costa (ESP)	Casa Galindo	+ 56"
8	Juan Gimeno (ESP)	Casa Galindo	s.t.
9	Jean Lesage (BEL)	Bicicletas Cil	+ 1' 00"
10	Daniel Taillieu (BEL)	Bicicletas Cil	s.t.

== Stage 3 ==
14 June 1948 - Valdepeñas to Granada, 232 km (144 mi)

Stage 3 result

Rank	Rider	Team	Time
1	Dalmacio Langarica (ESP)	Insecticidas ZZ	8h 27' 34"
2	Julián Berrendero (ESP)	Casa Galindo	+ 43"
3	Roberto Vercellone (ITA)	Pedal Notario	s.t.
4	Joaquín Olmos (ESP)	Casa Galindo	s.t.
5	Ricardo Ferrandiz (ESP)	U.D. Sans-Portaminas Alas Color	s.t.
6	Jean Lesage (BEL)	Bicicletas Cil	s.t.
7	Jean Breuer (BEL)	Bicicletas Cil	s.t.
8	Frans Gielen (BEL)	Bicicletas Cil	s.t.
9	Félix Adriano (ITA)	Hojas Afeitar Iberia	s.t.
10	Antoine Giauna (FRA)	Hojas Afeitar Iberia	s.t.

== Stage 4 ==
15 June 1948 - Granada to Murcia, 285 km (177 mi)

Stage 4 result

Rank	Rider	Team	Time
1	Bernardo Ruiz (ESP)	U.D. Sans-Portaminas Alas Color	10h 36' 45"
2	Dalmacio Langarica (ESP)	Insecticidas ZZ	s.t.
3	José Lahoz (ESP)	Digame	s.t.
4	Senén Mesa (ESP)	Bicicletas Gaitan	s.t.
5	Andrés Morán (ESP)	Bicicletas Gaitan	+ 11"
6	Agustín Miró (ESP)	Casa Galindo	+ 22"
7	Jean Lesage (BEL)	Bicicletas Cil	s.t.
8	Jean Breuer (BEL)	Bicicletas Cil	s.t.
9	Frans Gielen (BEL)	Bicicletas Cil	s.t.
10	Félix Adriano (ITA)	Hojas Afeitar Iberia	s.t.

General classification after Stage 4

Rank	Rider	Team	Time
1	Bernardo Ruiz (ESP)	U.D. Sans-Portaminas Alas Color	25h 18' 51"
2	Dalmacio Langarica (ESP)	Insecticidas ZZ	+ 8"
3	Frans Gielen (BEL)	Bicicletas Cil	+ 1' 12"
4	Julián Berrendero (ESP)	Casa Galindo	+ 1' 35"
5	Joaquín Olmos (ESP)	Casa Galindo	+ 2' 07"
6	Ricardo Ferrandiz (ESP)	U.D. Sans-Portaminas Alas Color	+ 2' 08"
7	Juan Gimeno (ESP)	Casa Galindo	s.t.
8	Jean Lesage (BEL)	Bicicletas Cil	+ 2' 12"
9	Jean Breuer (BEL)	Bicicletas Cil	s.t.
10	Roberto Vercellone (ITA)	Pedal Notario	+ 2' 15"

== Stage 5 ==
16 June 1948 - Murcia to Alicante, 230 km (140 mi)

Stage 5 result

Rank	Rider	Team	Time
1	Roberto Vercellone (ITA)	Pedal Notario	8h 19' 38"
2	Jean Lesage (BEL)	Bicicletas Cil	s.t.
3	Dalmacio Langarica (ESP)	Insecticidas ZZ	s.t.
4	Agustín Miró (ESP)	Casa Galindo	s.t.
5	Frans Gielen (BEL)	Bicicletas Cil	s.t.
6	Dominique Zanti (ITA)	Casa Galindo	s.t.
7	Émile Rol (FRA)	Hojas Afeitar Iberia	s.t.
8	Celestino Camilla (ITA)	Pedal Notario	s.t.
9	Antoine Giauna (FRA)	Hojas Afeitar Iberia	s.t.
10	Saverio Montuori (ITA)	Pedal Notario	s.t.

General classification after Stage 5

Rank	Rider	Team	Time
1	Bernardo Ruiz (ESP)	U.D. Sans-Portaminas Alas Color	33h 38' 29"
2	Dalmacio Langarica (ESP)	Insecticidas ZZ	+ 8"
3	Frans Gielen (BEL)	Bicicletas Cil	+ 1' 12"
4	Roberto Vercellone (ITA)	Pedal Notario	+ 1' 15"
5	Julián Berrendero (ESP)	Casa Galindo	+ 1' 35"
6	Joaquín Olmos (ESP)	Casa Galindo	+ 2' 07"
7	Juan Gimeno (ESP)	Casa Galindo	+ 2' 08"
8	Jean Lesage (BEL)	Bicicletas Cil	+ 2' 12"
9	Miguel Fombellida (ESP)	Hojas Afeitar Iberia	+ 2' 17"
10	Antoine Giauna (FRA)	Hojas Afeitar Iberia	+ 2' 18"

== Stage 6 ==
17 June 1948 - Alicante to Valencia, 163 km (101 mi)

Stage 6 result

Rank	Rider	Team	Time
1	Dalmacio Langarica (ESP)	Insecticidas ZZ	5h 31' 32"
2	Bernardo Ruiz (ESP)	U.D. Sans-Portaminas Alas Color	s.t.
3	Senén Mesa (ESP)	Bicicletas Gaitan	s.t.
4	Manuel Costa (ESP)	Casa Galindo	s.t.
5	Bernardo Capó (ESP)	Veloz Sport Balear	s.t.
6	Emilio Rodríguez (ESP)	U.D. Sans-Portaminas Alas Color	s.t.
7	Pedro Font (ESP)	Digame	s.t.
8	José Lahoz (ESP)	Digame	s.t.
9	Francisco Masip (ESP)	Insecticidas ZZ	s.t.
10	Miguel Gual (ESP)	Veloz Sport Balear	s.t.

General classification after Stage 6

Rank	Rider	Team	Time
1	Dalmacio Langarica (ESP)	Insecticidas ZZ	39h 28' 09"
2	Bernardo Ruiz (ESP)	U.D. Sans-Portaminas Alas Color	+ 1' 52"
3	Manuel Costa (ESP)	Casa Galindo	+ 2' 15"
4	Senén Mesa (ESP)	Bicicletas Gaitan	+ 5' 04"
5	Bernardo Capó (ESP)	Veloz Sport Balear	+ 6' 26"
6	Emilio Rodríguez (ESP)	U.D. Sans-Portaminas Alas Color	+ 6' 35"
7	Frans Gielen (BEL)	Bicicletas Cil	+ 13' 47"
8	José Lahoz (ESP)	Digame	+ 14' 05"
9	Miguel Fombellida (ESP)	Hojas Afeitar Iberia	+ 14' 52"
10	Antoine Giauna (FRA)	Hojas Afeitar Iberia	s.t.

== Stage 7 ==
19 June 1948 - Valencia to Tortosa, 201 km (125 mi)

Stage 7 result

Rank	Rider	Team	Time
1	José Pérez (ESP)	U.D. Sans-Portaminas Alas Color	7h 15' 55"
2	Jean Lesage (BEL)	Bicicletas Cil	s.t.
3	Roberto Vercellone (ITA)	Pedal Notario	s.t.
4	Miguel Gual (ESP)	Veloz Sport Balear	s.t.
5	Dalmacio Langarica (ESP)	Insecticidas ZZ	s.t.
6	Jean Bogaerts (BEL)	Bicicletas Cil	s.t.
7	Antoine Giauna (FRA)	Hojas Afeitar Iberia	s.t.
8	Félix Adriano (ITA)	Hojas Afeitar Iberia	s.t.
9	Celestino Camilla (ITA)	Pedal Notario	s.t.
10	Saverio Montuori (ITA)	Pedal Notario	s.t.

General classification after Stage 7

Rank	Rider	Team	Time
1	Dalmacio Langarica (ESP)	Insecticidas ZZ	46h 44' 04"
2	Bernardo Ruiz (ESP)	U.D. Sans-Portaminas Alas Color	+ 1' 52"
3	Manuel Costa (ESP)	Casa Galindo	+ 4' 15"
4	Senén Mesa (ESP)	Bicicletas Gaitan	+ 5' 04"
5	Bernardo Capó (ESP)	Veloz Sport Balear	+ 6' 26"
6	Emilio Rodríguez (ESP)	U.D. Sans-Portaminas Alas Color	+ 6' 35"
7	José Pérez (ESP)	U.D. Sans-Portaminas Alas Color	+ 14' 02"
8	José Lahoz (ESP)	Digame	+ 14' 05"
9	Miguel Fombellida (ESP)	Hojas Afeitar Iberia	+ 14' 52"
10	Antoine Giauna (FRA)	Hojas Afeitar Iberia	+ 14' 57"

== Stage 8 ==
20 June 1948 - Tortosa to Barcelona, 209 km (130 mi)

Stage 8 result

Rank	Rider	Team	Time
1	Senén Mesa (ESP)	Bicicletas Gaitan	7h 28' 35"
2	Ricardo Ferrandiz (ESP)	U.D. Sans-Portaminas Alas Color	s.t.
3	Bernardo Ruiz (ESP)	U.D. Sans-Portaminas Alas Color	+ 1' 05"
4	Antonio Gelabert (ESP)	Veloz Sport Balear	s.t.
5	Dalmacio Langarica (ESP)	Insecticidas ZZ	s.t.
6	Victorio Ruiz (ESP)	Agris Radio	s.t.
7	Jean Breuer (BEL)	Bicicletas Cil	s.t.
8	Manuel Costa (ESP)	Casa Galindo	s.t.
9	Juan Gimeno (ESP)	Casa Galindo	s.t.
10	Miguel Gual (ESP)	Veloz Sport Balear	s.t.

General classification after Stage 8

Rank	Rider	Team	Time
1	Dalmacio Langarica (ESP)	Insecticidas ZZ	54h 13' 44"
2	Bernardo Ruiz (ESP)	U.D. Sans-Portaminas Alas Color	+ 1' 52"
3	Senén Mesa (ESP)	Bicicletas Gaitan	+ 2' 59"
4	Manuel Costa (ESP)	Casa Galindo	+ 4' 15"
5	Emilio Rodríguez (ESP)	U.D. Sans-Portaminas Alas Color	+ 6' 35"
6	Bernardo Capó (ESP)	Veloz Sport Balear	+ 7' 56"
7	Antoine Giauna (FRA)	Hojas Afeitar Iberia	+ 15' 12"
8	José Serra (ESP)	U.D. Sans-Portaminas Alas Color	+ 15' 14"
9	Ricardo Ferrandiz (ESP)	U.D. Sans-Portaminas Alas Color	+ 15' 39"
10	José Pérez (ESP)	U.D. Sans-Portaminas Alas Color	+ 15' 42"

== Stage 9 ==
21 June 1948 - Barcelona to Lleida, 203 km (126 mi)

== Stage 10 ==
22 June 1948 - Lleida to Zaragoza, 144 km (89 mi)

Stage 10 result

Rank	Rider	Team	Time
1	Jean Lesage (BEL)	Bicicletas Cil	6h 58' 06"
2	José Pérez (ESP)	U.D. Sans-Portaminas Alas Color	s.t.
3	Dalmacio Langarica (ESP)	Insecticidas ZZ	s.t.
4	Celestino Camilla (ITA)	Pedal Notario	s.t.
5	Gabriel Saura (ESP)	Digame	s.t.
6	Joaquín Olmos (ESP)	Casa Galindo	s.t.
7	Jean Bogaerts (BEL)	Bicicletas Cil	s.t.
8	Antoine Giauna (FRA)	Hojas Afeitar Iberia	s.t.
9	Julián Berrendero (ESP)	Casa Galindo	s.t.
10	Victorio Ruiz (ESP)	Agris Radio	s.t.

General classification after Stage 10

Rank	Rider	Team	Time
1	Dalmacio Langarica (ESP)	Insecticidas ZZ	68h 11' 07"
2	Bernardo Ruiz (ESP)	U.D. Sans-Portaminas Alas Color	+ 1' 52"
3	Senén Mesa (ESP)	Bicicletas Gaitan	+ 2' 59"
4	Manuel Costa (ESP)	Casa Galindo	+ 4' 15"
5	Bernardo Capó (ESP)	Veloz Sport Balear	+ 7' 56"
6	Emilio Rodríguez (ESP)	U.D. Sans-Portaminas Alas Color	+ 8' 17"
7	Antoine Giauna (FRA)	Hojas Afeitar Iberia	+ 15' 12"
8	José Serra (ESP)	U.D. Sans-Portaminas Alas Color	+ 15' 14"
9	Ricardo Ferrandiz (ESP)	U.D. Sans-Portaminas Alas Color	+ 15' 39"
10	José Pérez (ESP)	U.D. Sans-Portaminas Alas Color	+ 15' 42"
