= Bres (Taramundi) =

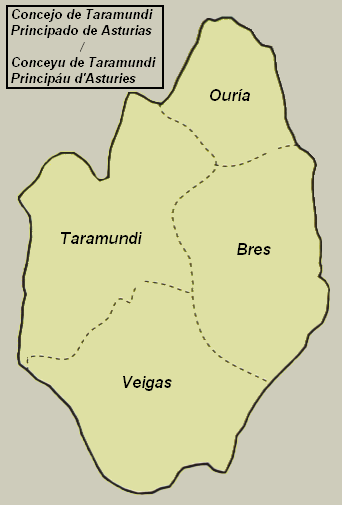
Map of Bres within Taramundi.

Bres is one of four parishes (administrative divisions) in Taramundi, a municipality within the province and autonomous community of Asturias, in northern Spain.

Situated at 350 m (1,150 ft) above sea level, it is 22.76 km^{2} (8.79 sq mi) in size, with a population of 164 (INE 2004).

== Villages and hamlets ==
- Arroxo 43.366667°N 7.05°W
- Bres
- Cabaza
- Entorcisa 43.383333°N 7.066667°W
- Freixe 43.366667°N 7.033333°W
- Os Galiñeiros 43.366667°N 7.083333°W
- Leiras
- Lóutima
- O Mazo de Bres
- Sirvallá
- O Teixo
