= Ouria =

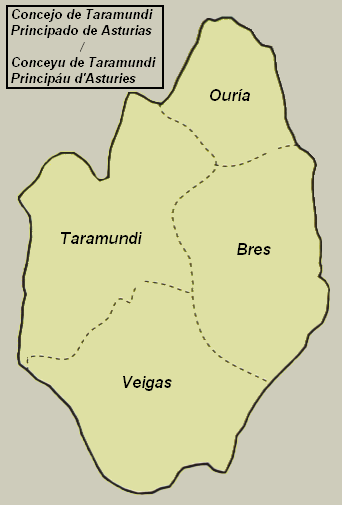
Map of Ouria in northern Taramundi.

Ouria (in Spanish, Ouría) is one of four parishes (administrative divisions) in Taramundi, a municipality within the province and autonomous community of Asturias, in northern Spain.

Situated at 300 m (980 ft) above sea level, it is 9.77 km^{2} (3.77 sq mi) in size, with a population of 105 (INE 2004).

== Villages and hamlets ==
The place names are in Eonavian. In brackets is shown the name in Spanish.

- O Castro (El Castro) 43.4°N 7.05°W
- Chaudeleiras (Chao de Leiras)
- Fabal 43.416667°N 7.05°W
- A Lamisqueira (Lamisqueira) 43.433333°N 7.05°W
- Ouria (Ouría)
- As Tingas (Tingas) 43.4°N 7.066667°W
- Villarede 43.383333°N 7.05°W
