= Barreiros, Lugo =

Coordinates: 43°32′0″N 7°14′0″W

Barreiros
- Municipality
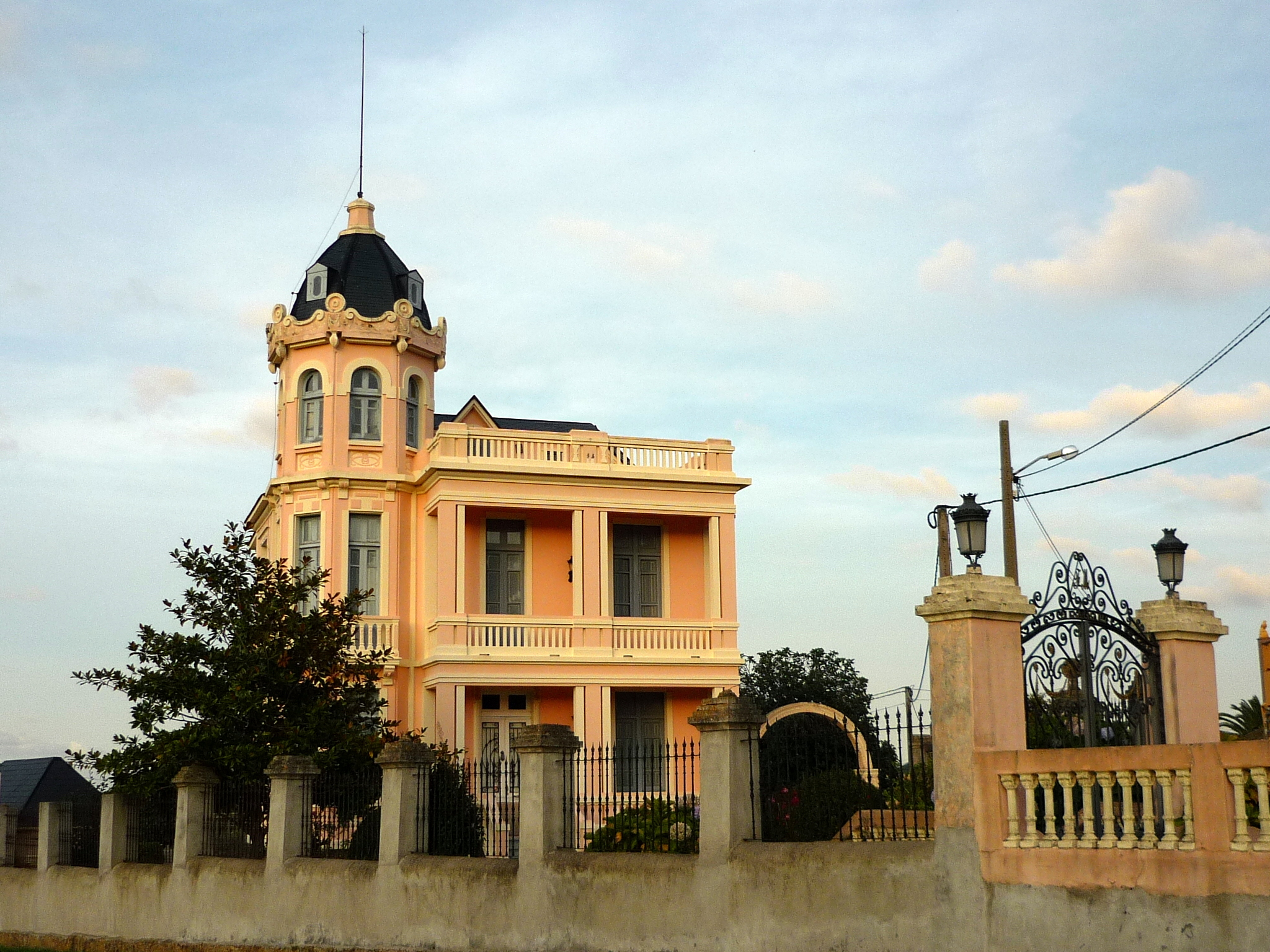
- Casa indiana in Barreiros.

- Coat of arms

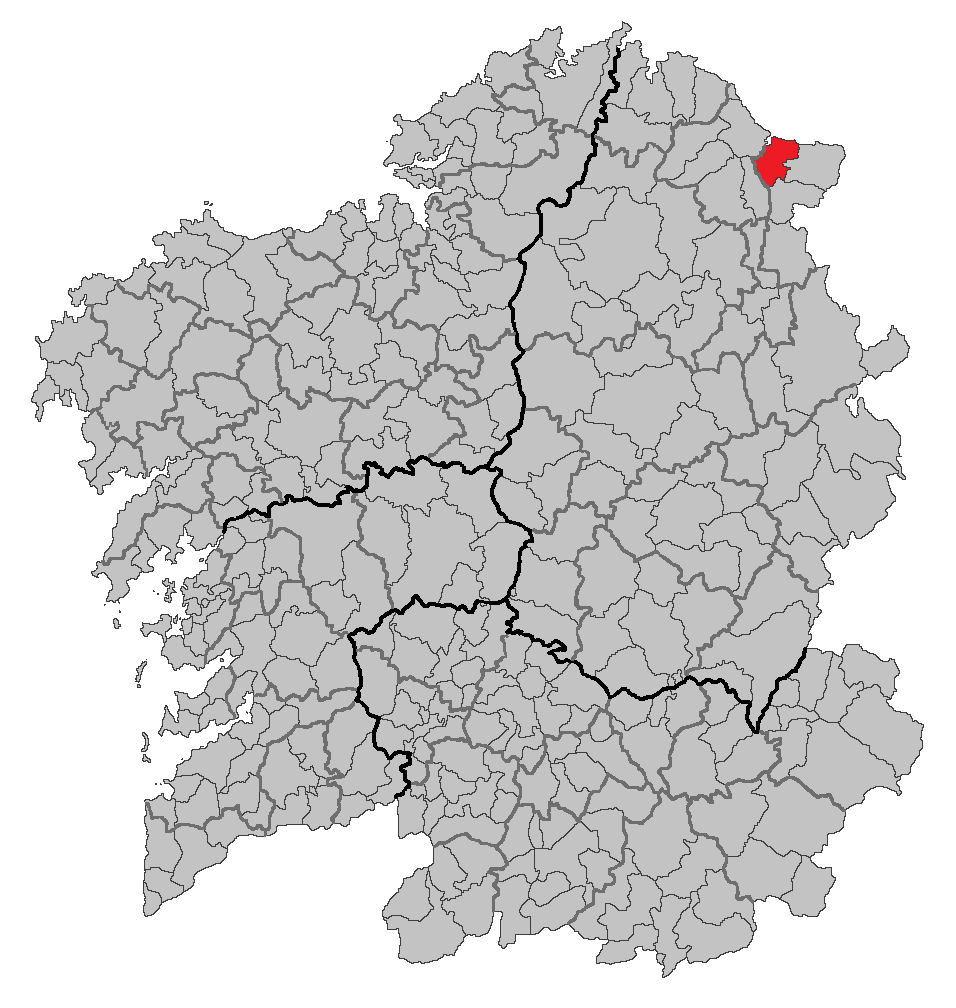
- Location of Barreiros

- Location in Spain
- Country: Spain
- Autonomous community: Galicia
- Province: Lugo
- Comarca: A Mariña Oriental

Government
  - Alcalde: Ana Ermida Igrexas (BNG)

Population (2025-01-01)
  - Total: 3,036
- Demonym(s): barreirés, -a
- Time zone: UTC+1 (CET)
  - Summer (DST): UTC+2 (CEST)
- Postal code: 27790
- Website: Official website

Barreiros is a municipality in the province of Lugo, in the autonomous community of Galicia, Spain. It belongs to the comarca of A Mariña Oriental. This municipality is closely linked to the history of the province from pre-Roman times. It has a geographical range extending from the valleys to the mountains and from the plains to the coast with high cliffs and long beaches.

== History ==
The first name mentioned is that of Cabarcos, which seems to come from Civarcos. The town was named for Plinio and situated between the mouths of Eo and Masma. During the Middle Ages the name Cabarcos or Cibarcos continued to appear. The oldest document in which it is named Barreiros was in 775. It corresponds to a donation of land of King Don Silo to monks so that they could build a monastery.

Around 1400 Pardo de Cela held the preserve forum of Santa Cristina de Celeiro. In 1406 Lopez Diaz donated the Terrería de Cabarcos to the Bishop of Mondoñedo. Pedro Pardo de Cabarcos, nephew of Marshal Pardo de Cela, sold land to the value of 2,000 maravedis to help the Catholic Monarchs during the fall of Granada. Natural de Celeiro Santa Cristina was John of Ben, who stood out for his bravery in the war of Aragon next to Don Juan II.

During the eighteenth and nineteenth Barreiros's history was linked to emigration. Some of the emigrants, popularly called "Americans" contributed to cultural development, establishment of parochial schools, city development and Indian buildings, which today are some of the most peculiar features of the area.

== Demography ==
Barreiros has 3,252 inhabitants. The town suffered a significant decrease in population early in the century due to emigration to the Americas. Now it continues a negative growth.

The distribution of the population is very dispersed. Only 16% of the population resides in the center compared to 84% that remains dispersed throughout the region.

== Geography ==
Barreiros is located in the region of A Mariña Oriental on the northern coast of Galicia.

To the north the municipality has 8 kilometers of Cantabrian coast with a number of beaches. To the west it borders Foz and Lourenzá, to the east it borders Ribadeo and to the south it borders Lourenzá and Trabada.
