= A Pontenova =

Coordinates: 43°20′53″N 7°11′33″W

- Municipality
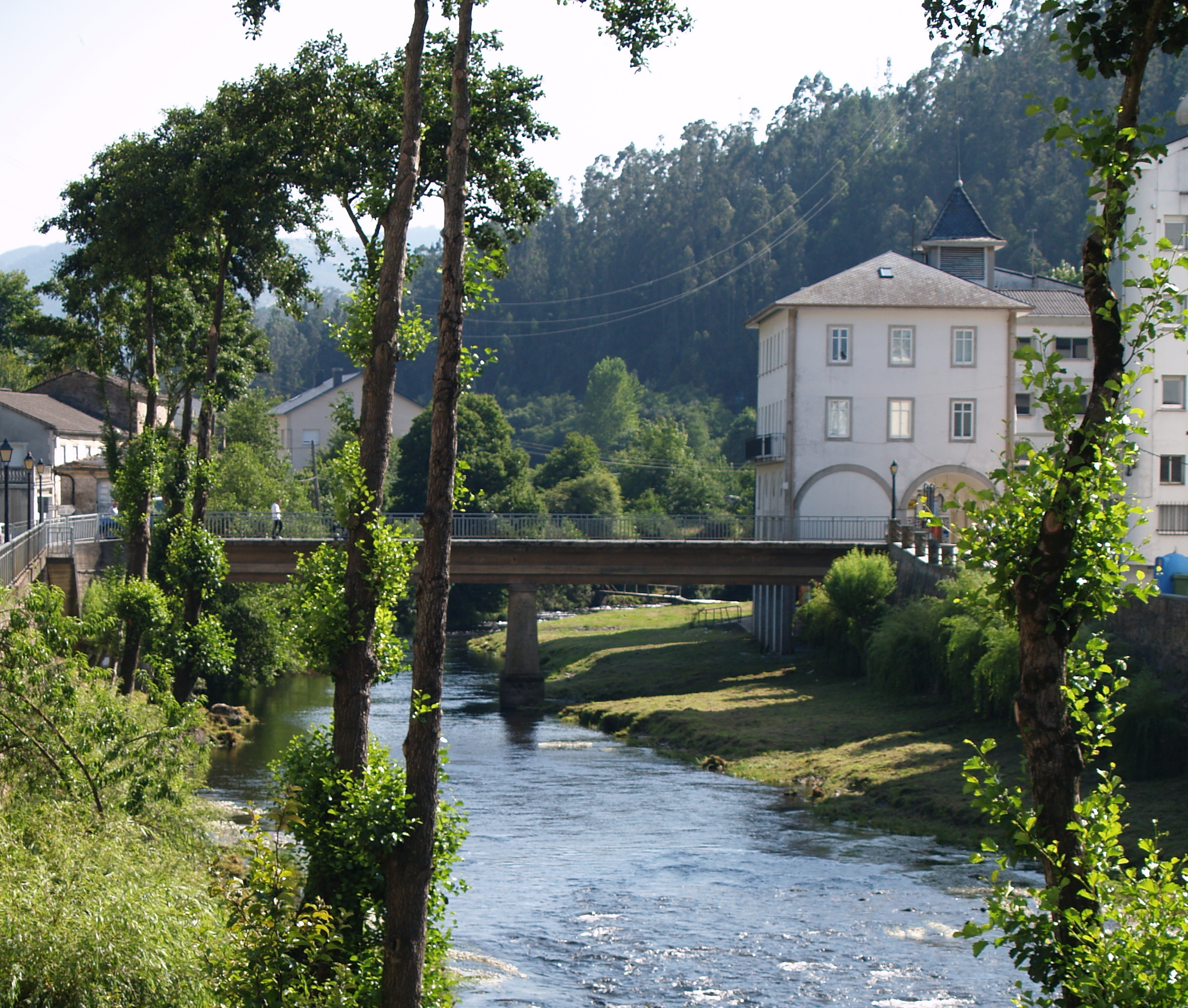
- The Eo river passing through A Pontenova.

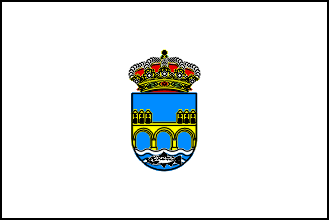
- Flag Coat of arms

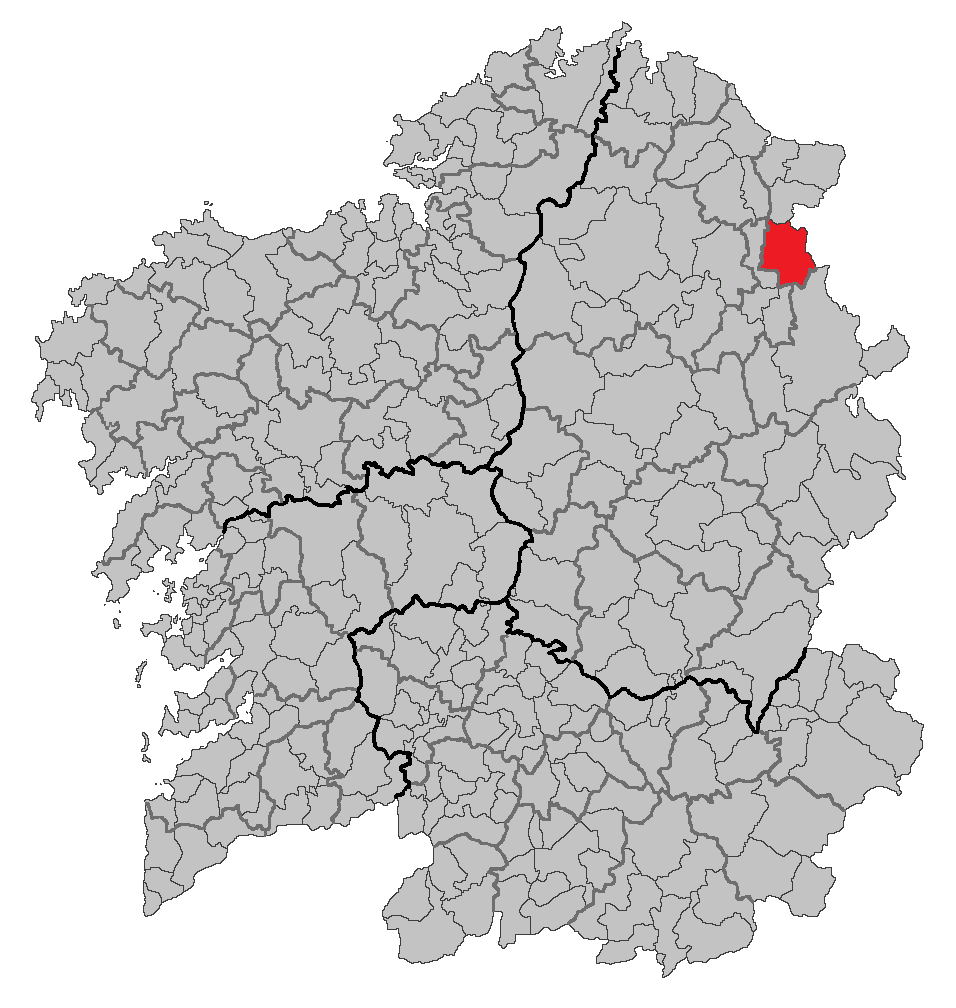
- Location of A Pontenova

- Location in Spain
- Country: Spain
- Autonomous community: Galicia
- Province: Lugo
- Comarca: A Mariña Oriental

Government
  - Alcalde: Darío Campos Conde (PSdeG)

Population (2025-01-01)
  - Total: 2,106
- Demonym(s): pontenovés, -a
- Time zone: UTC+1 (CET)
  - Summer (DST): UTC+2 (CEST)
- Postal code: 27720
- Website: Official website

A Pontenova is a municipality in the province of Lugo, in the autonomous community of Galicia, Spain. It belongs to the comarca of A Mariña Oriental. It has a population of 3199 (Spanish 2003 Census) and an area of 136 km^{2}.

== A Pontenova and the Turia Valley ==
A Pontenova is part of the Turia Valley or “Valle del Turia”, a small valley on the western border of the Cantabrian Mountains in the northwest of Spain which is close to beaches and is divided by two counties: Asturias and Galicia. It consists of an area of 90 km^{2}, 3,910 inhabitants and is 200 m above sea level. There are two main towns are A Pontenova (Galicia) and Taramundi (Asturias).

The Turia Valley is a range of small mountains, ancient oak forests and rivers.

The climate in the region is pleasant throughout the year. As with the rest of northern Spain (or the Green Spain), the climate is more variable than the southern parts of Spain and is characterised by an Atlantic climate. The average temperature in summer is usually around 26 °C. The average temperature in winter is 8 °C (12 °C in the day and 4 °C at night).

The Turia River (250 m altitude) gives its name to the valley. The Turia Valley is surrounded by hills and mountains, including, Sierra de Piedafita (900 m), Sierra de Ouroso (1033 m), Sierras de Dendin (900 m), Sierra de Teixedais (900 m) and Sierra de Eirua (700 m).

The patrimony of the Valley has more than 60 religious buildings and places of worship, such as the church of San Martin de Tarimundi founded in the 18th century (Taramundi) or the Santuario de Santa María de Conforto founded in the 16th century (A Pontenova).

== UNESCO Biosphere Reserve ==
Also A Pontenova is part of the Eo River, Oscos and Buron lands Biosphere Reserve. A Biosphere Reserve is an international conservation designation given by UNESCO under its Programme on Man and the Biosphere (MAB). The World Network of Biosphere Reserves is the collection of all 531 biosphere reserves in 105 countries (as of May, 2008). Biosphere reserves are created to promote and demonstrate a balanced relationship between humans and the biosphere. The area included in the Biosphere Reserve occupies a surface of 158.883 hectares of which 215km2 belongs to the area of the Turia Valley.

Agriculture, fish farming and tourism are the principal areas of growth for the region. Although there has been a fall in the primary sector in recent years and an increase in the service sectors as rural tourism, agriculture still remains the largest economical activity of local economy.

Micro businesses and family run businesses are very characteristic of the region. Construction, commerce, hotels and rural tourism also account for high percentage of local business.

Rural tourism is now a growing activity in all the Reserve, at present there are about 170 establishments catered for rural tourism.

== Turia River ==
The Turia River or “Río Turía” is a small river, 9 km in length and an altitude of 250m above the sea, which rises in the town of Taramundi (Asturias) and drains into the Eo River in the town of A Pontenova (Lugo).

The Turia river gives its name to the Turia Valley or “Valle del Turía” that crosses horizontally before emptying into the Eo river. The Turia river is fed by numerous streams and creeks from the mountains that limit the valley, and is part of the Eo UNESCO biosphere reserve.

While the river is born in Asturias, the bulk of his wealth is found in Lugo (Galicia).

The Turia river is a source of industry and its waters are used to generate socio-economic activities based on ancient traditions such as Navajeros crafts and textiles, as well as the primary industry of salmon farming in A Ponenova (Lugo).

- Source: Near as As Veigas, Taramundi (Asturias).
- Ending: Río Eo, A Pontenova (Lugo).
- Distance: 9 km.
- Altitude: 800m - 250m.
- Tributary rivers: Small local creeks and streams.
- Runs: Asturias: As Veigas, Mazonovo, Taramundi, A Garda y Mousende. Lugo: Conforto y A Pontenova.

== Eo River ==
The Eo is a river in northwestern Spain. Some 91 km in length, its estuary forms the boundary between the regions of Galicia and Asturias. The river is known for its salmon fishing.
