= As Catedrais beach =

Beach in Aguas Santas, Galicia, Spain

Coordinates: 43°33′14″N 7°9′26″W

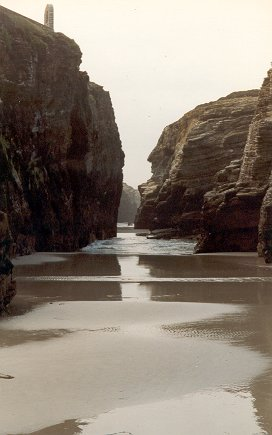
Las Catedrales or As Catedrais

Praia das Catedrais (Spanish: playa de las Catedrales, English: Beach of the Cathedrals) is on the northwest coast of Spain. It is the name given by the tourism industry to Praia de Augas Santas (translated from Galician: 'Beach of the Holy Waters'). The beach is located in the Ribadeo municipality, in the province of Lugo (Galicia), on the Cantabric coast, and it lies about ten kilometres to the west of the town of Ribadeo. Its name is derived from its cliff formations.

It has been declared a Natural Monument by the regional Ministry for the Environment of the Xunta de Galicia.

== Overview ==
The characteristic features of the beach are its natural arches and caves, which can be seen only at low tide. During high tide, the beach appears small, but still suitable for swimming. During low tide the size of its cliffs and sea caves is more apparent, ranging from small cracks on the rock to big caves whose roofs have collapsed due to the erosion of the waves.

At low tide, there is access to a sand deposit delimited by a rocky wall made from slate and schist forming 30 metre arches resembling cathedral flying buttresses, large caves, sand corridors between rocky blocks, and other geological features. Particularly low tides create access to nearby beaches through the sand extension. As the coast stretch is almost horizontal, the water covers the beach again very quickly.

== Gallery ==
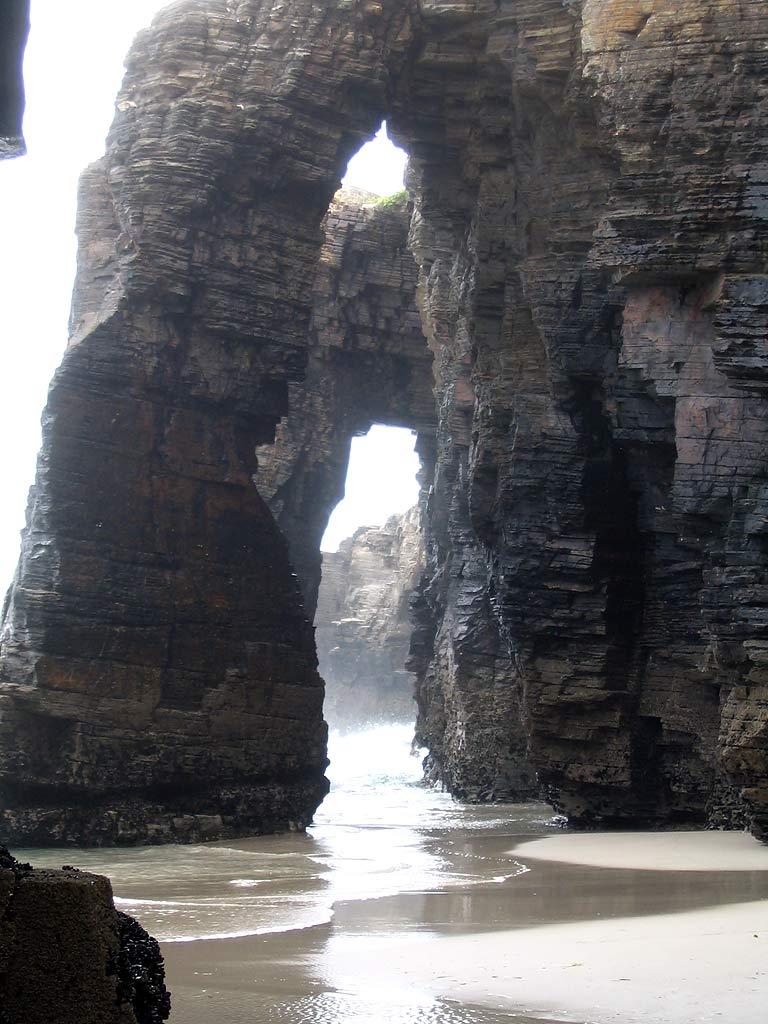

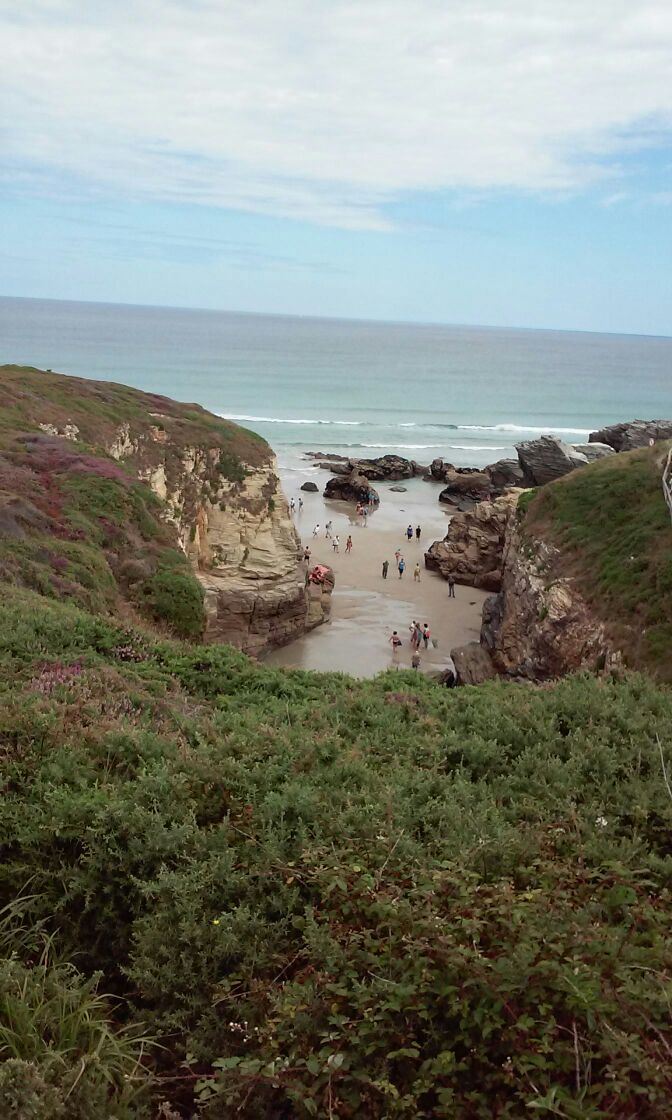

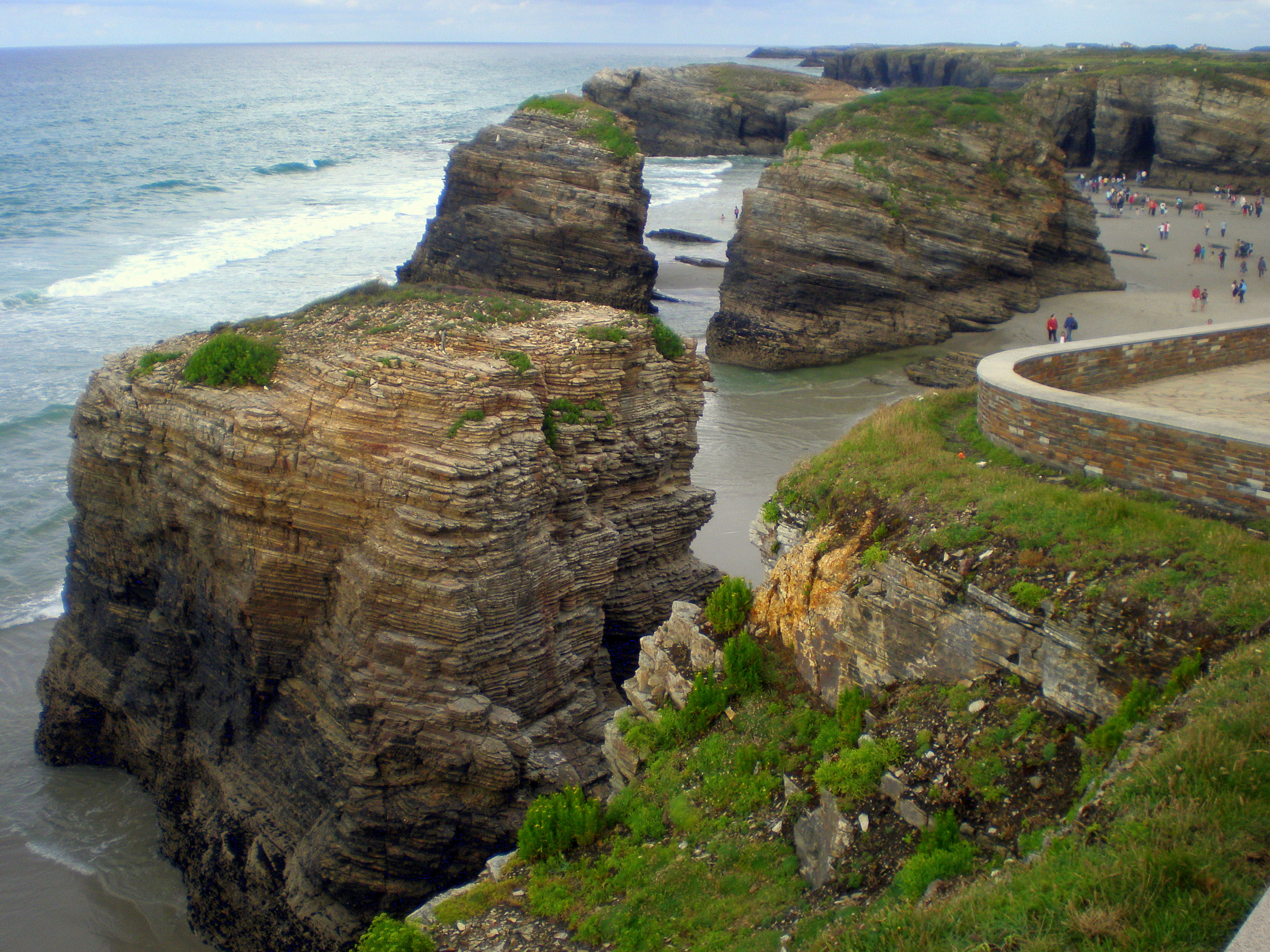

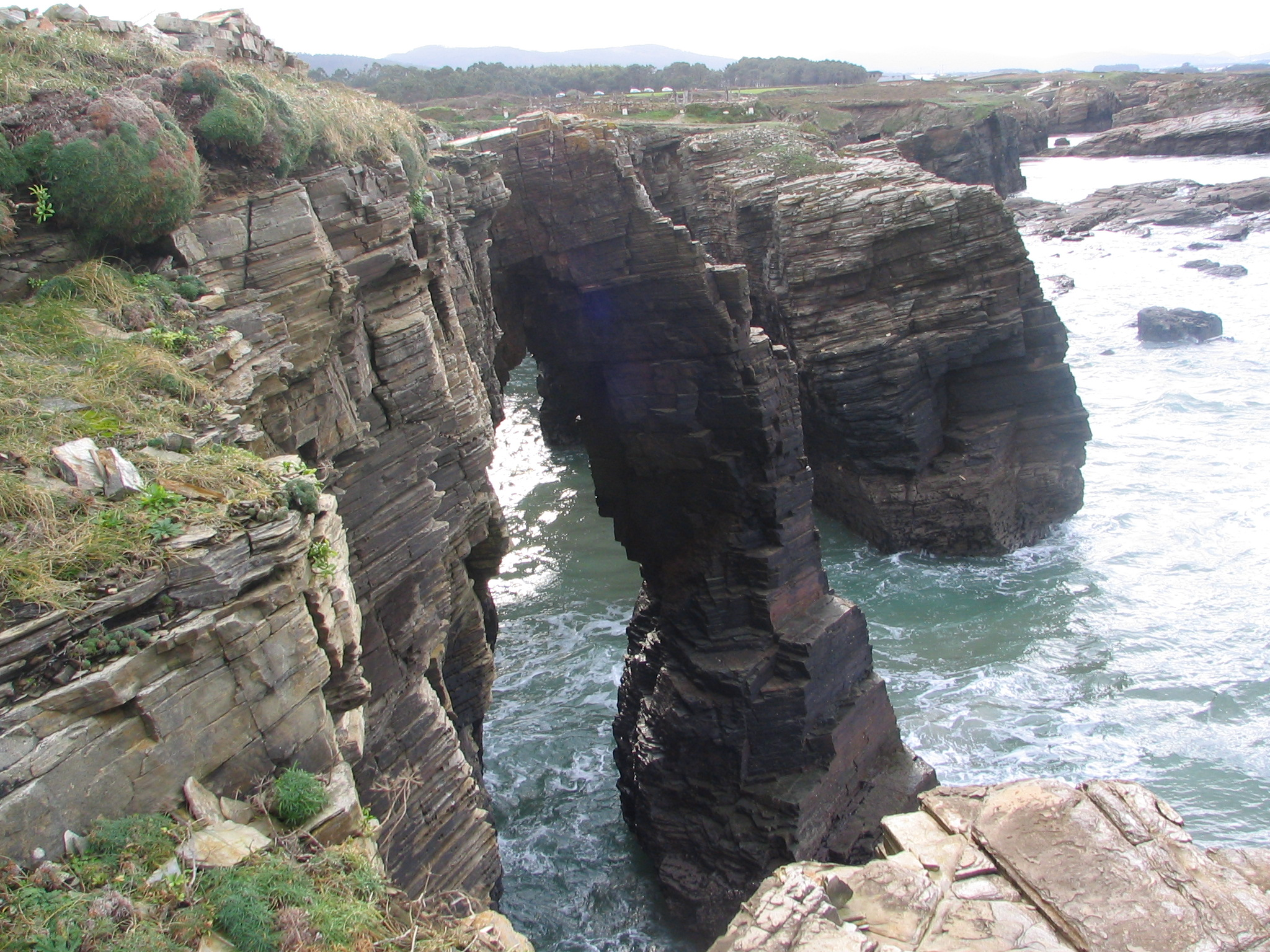

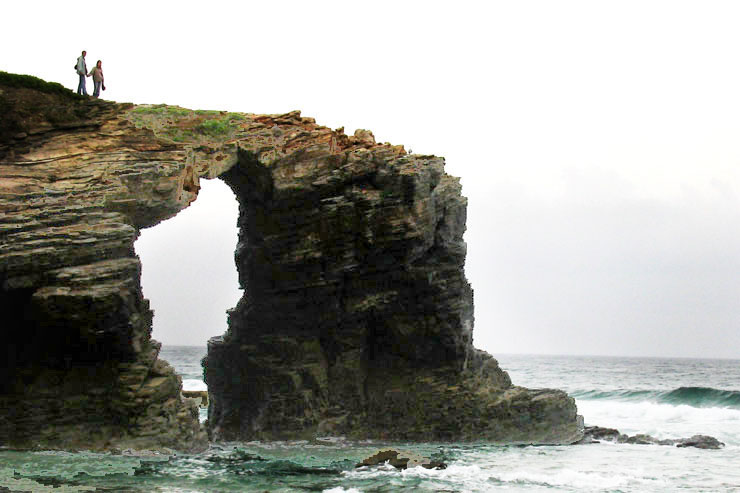

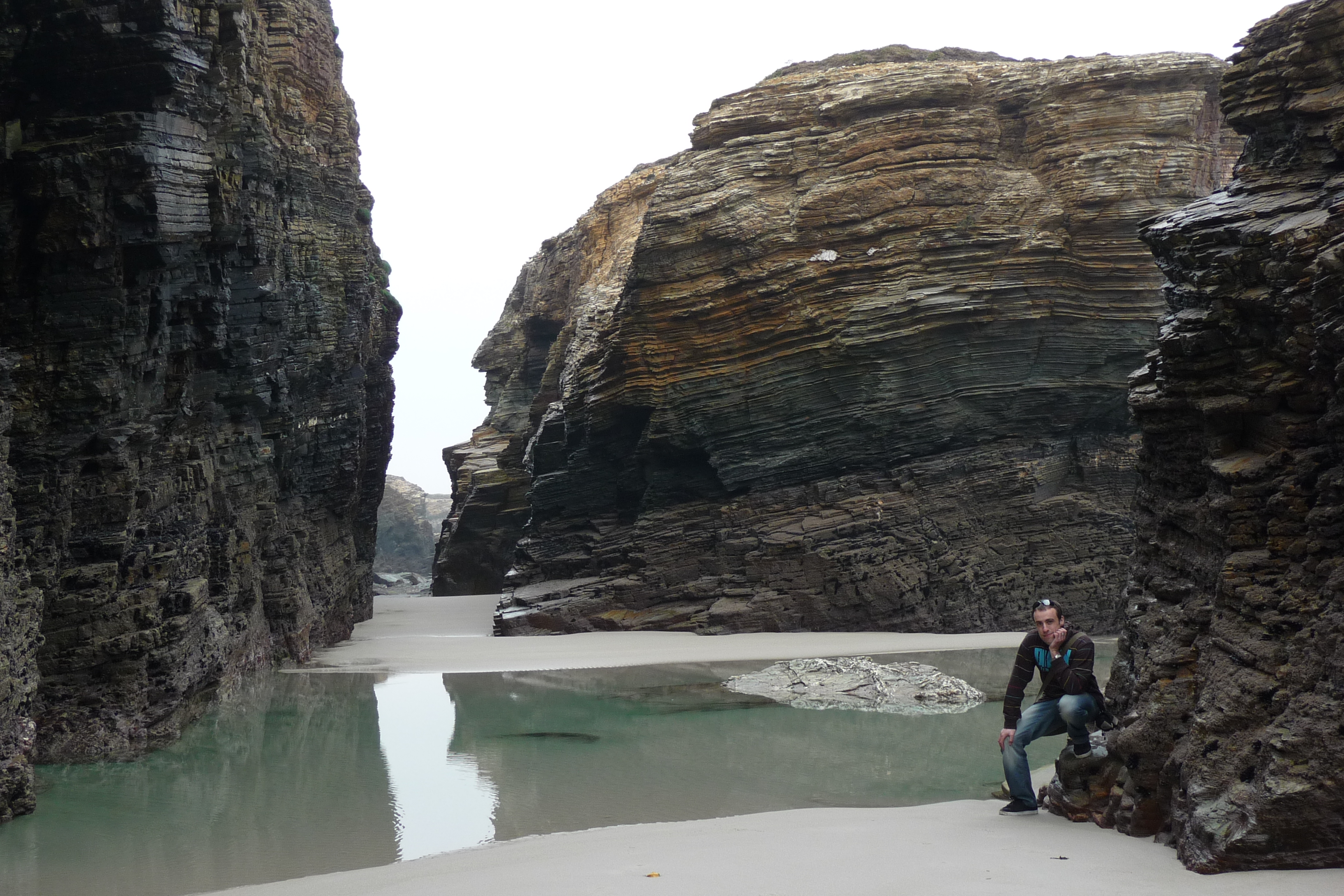

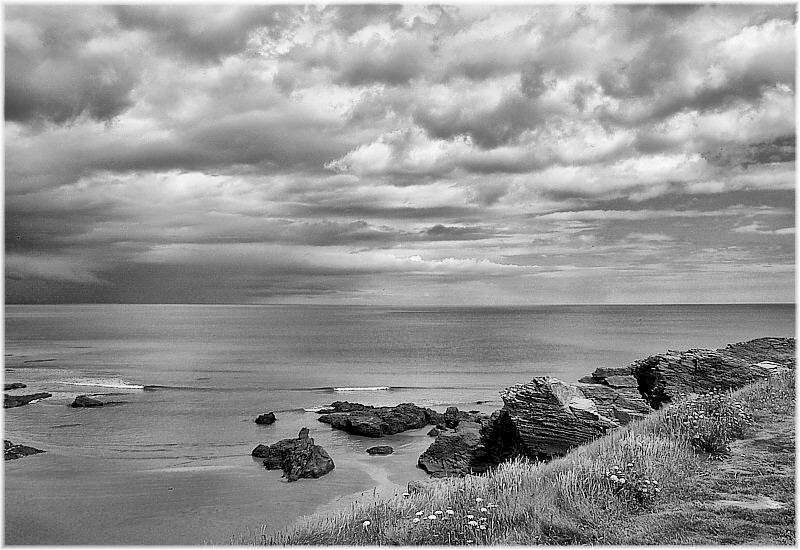

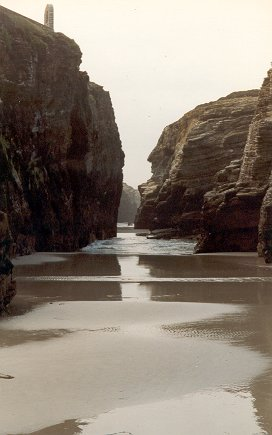
