= As Veigas =

Parish (parroquia) in Asturias, Spain

Coordinates: 43.333333°N 7.066667°W

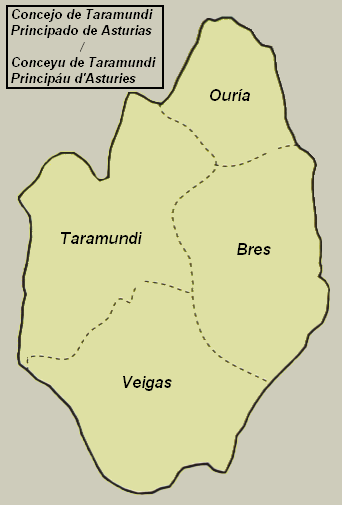
Map of Veigas within Taramundi municipality.

As Veigas is one of four parishes (administrative divisions) in Taramundi, a municipality within the province and autonomous community of Asturias, in northern Spain.

Situated at 400 m (1,300 ft) above sea level, it is 23.25 km^{2} (8.98 sq mi) in size, with a population of 98 (INE 2004).

== Towns ==
- Os Armallos
- Os Couces
- El Couso
- Os Esquíos
- A Folgueirosa
- O Navallo
- A Preira
- Santa Mariña
- Os Teixóis
- Turía
- As Veigas
