= Trabada =

Coordinates: 43°12′04″N 6°56′22″W

- Municipality
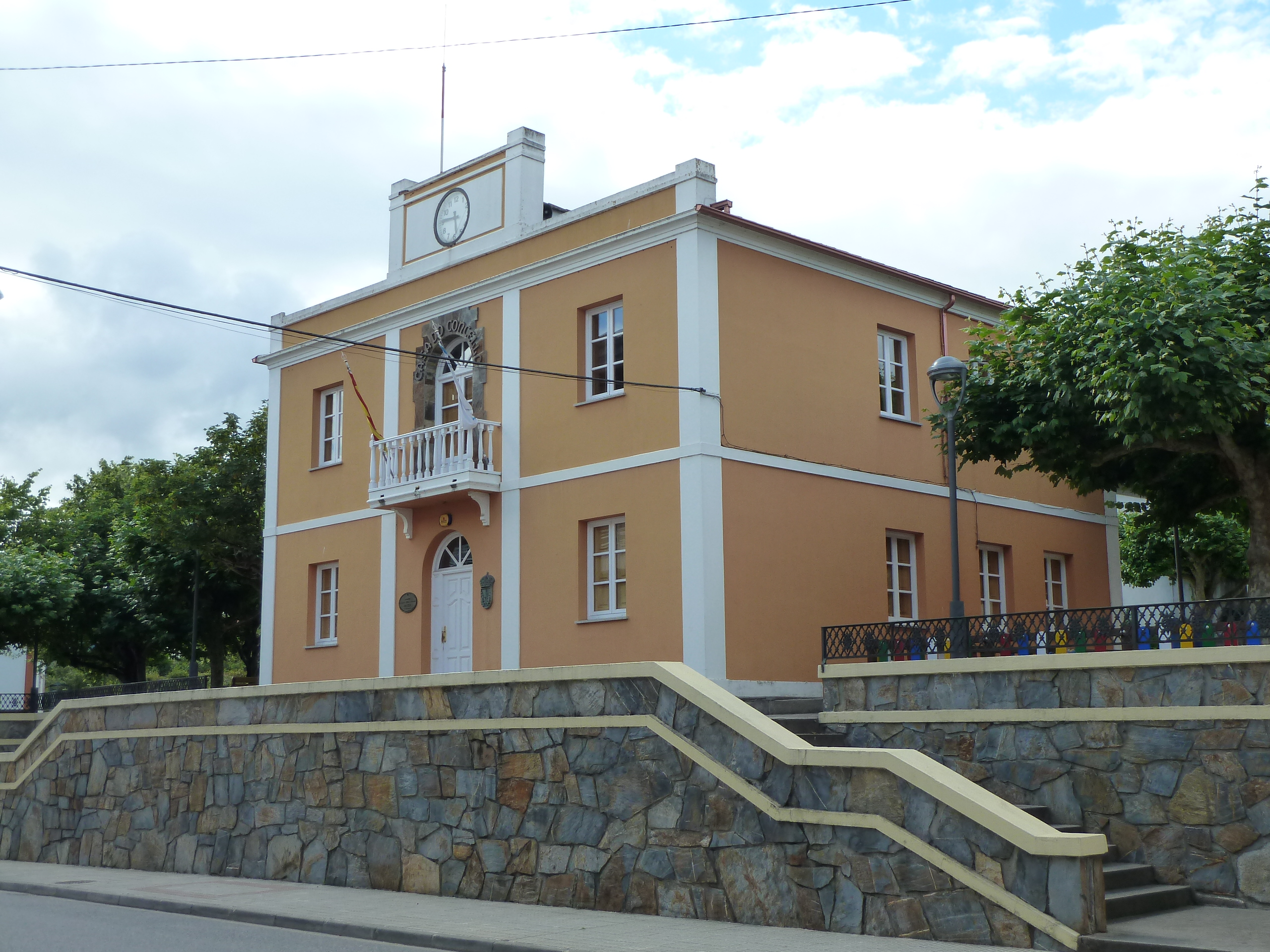
- Town hall.

- Flag Coat of arms

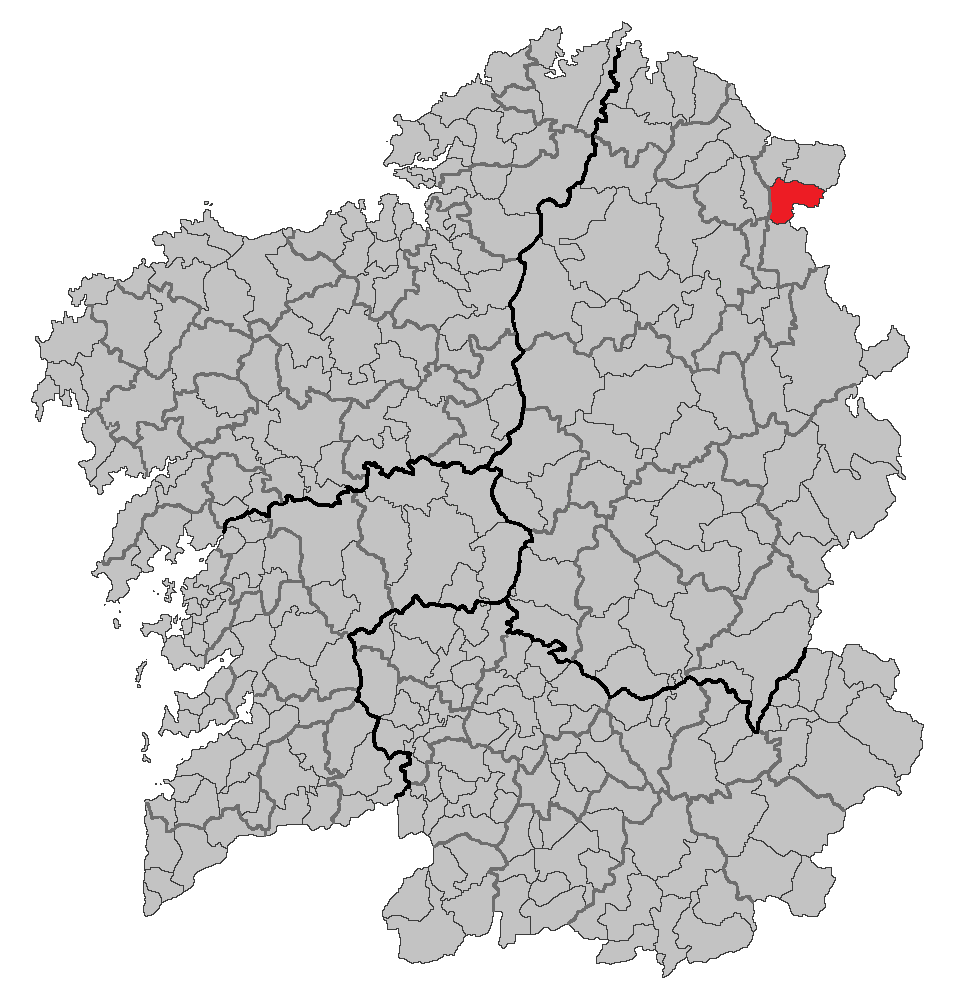
- Location of Trabada

- Location in Spain
- Country: Spain
- Autonomous community: Galicia
- Province: Lugo
- Comarca: A Mariña Oriental

Government
  - Alcalde: Rubén García Freije (PSdeG)

Population (2025-01-01)
  - Total: 1,070
- Demonym(s): trabadés, -a
- Time zone: UTC+1 (CET)
  - Summer (DST): UTC+2 (CEST)
- Postal code: 27000–27999
- Website: Official website

Trabada is a municipality in the province of Lugo, in the autonomous community of Galicia, Spain. It belongs to the comarca of A Mariña Oriental.
