= Ribadeo =

- Municipality
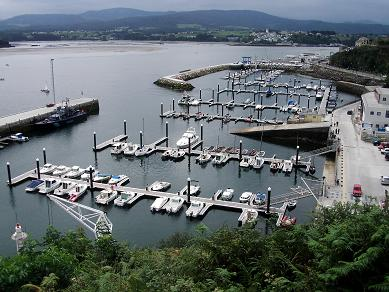
- Port of Ribadeo

- Flag Coat of arms

- Location of Ribadeo in the Province of Lugo Location of Ribadeo in Galicia Location of Ribadeo in Spain
- Coordinates: 43°32′1″N 7°2′25″W
- Country: Spain
- Autonomous community: Galicia
- Province: Lugo
- Comarca: A Mariña Oriental

Government
  - Mayor: Fernando Suárez Barcia (BNG)

Area
  - Total: 106 km^{2} (41 sq mi)
- Elevation (AMSL (highest point)): 571 m (1,873 ft)

Population (2025-01-01)
  - Total: 10,022
  - Density: 94.5/km^{2} (245/sq mi)
- Time zone: UTC+1 (CET)
  - Summer (DST): UTC+2 (CEST (GMT +2))
- Postal code: 27700
- Area code: +34 (Spain) + 982 (Lugo)
- Website: www.ribadeo.gal

Ribadeo is a municipality in the Spanish province of Lugo in Galicia. It has a population of 10,023 (INE, 2011) and an area of 106.2 km^{2} (41.0 sq mi). It is the capital of the A Mariña Oriental comarca.

== Geography ==
The municipality of Ribadeo has approximately the shape of a 10x10 kilometer square. It is bordered to the north by the Cantabrian Sea, to the east by the Ribadeo estuary (on the other side of which is Castropol in Asturias), to the west by the municipality of Barreiros and to the south by that of Trabada. The capital of the municipality is the town of Ribadeo. There is one other town - Rinlo - and many small villages and hamlets. The highest point of the municipality is the mountain of Mondigo (571 m (1,873 ft)), in the parish of Cubelas.

== History ==
The first well-known settlements date from Iron Age such as the Gallaecian hillforts of Grovas, Fornelo, Meirengos, Cárcovas, Pumarega, Torre and Aira da Croa. All of them were inhabited by the Gallecian tribe of the Egovarri. During the 6th century the first texts referred to this county as part of Britonia. During the 13th century, Ribadeo received privileges from the king Ferdinand II. The town began as a settlement beside the estuary, occupying what are now the docks of Porcillán and Cabanela, and later expanded on to higher land. It had a wall - more for customs purposes than for defence - of which some remains are still preserved. Along with Viveiro and Mondoñedo, it was one of the three main medieval towns of the former province of Mondoñedo. It was granted a town charter by Fernando III, permitting a weekly market, which is still held. For a while the town was royal property and was then granted to a French nobleman, Pierre de Villeines, in recognition of his services to Enrique de Trastámara. After Villeines there were several further transfers of ownership; the county of Ribadeo became a possession of the House of Alba. The present Count, the twenty-seventh, is Carlos Fitz-James Stuart Martinez de Irujo. Ribadeo's peak as a town coincided with that of its port, being a focal point of the trade of Cantabria with the Baltic region: it was the only point of entry for imports of liquor (Kümmel) from the port of Riga. For this reason the beverage became known as Kúmel of Ribadeo. In the mid-nineteenth century the port went into decline due to competition from other ports such as Gijón. The coat of arms of the town is of medieval origin. It depicts waves of the sea on which are superimposed a golden key at an oblique angle and a silver star. The key symbolizes the town's incorporation into Galicia, and the star its northern location. Until the late seventeenth century the coat of arms lacked the star and the key was in the upright position. This older version can be seen carved in stone in 1699, in the chapel of the Virxe do Camiño, at which time it was already ancient.

== Places of interest ==
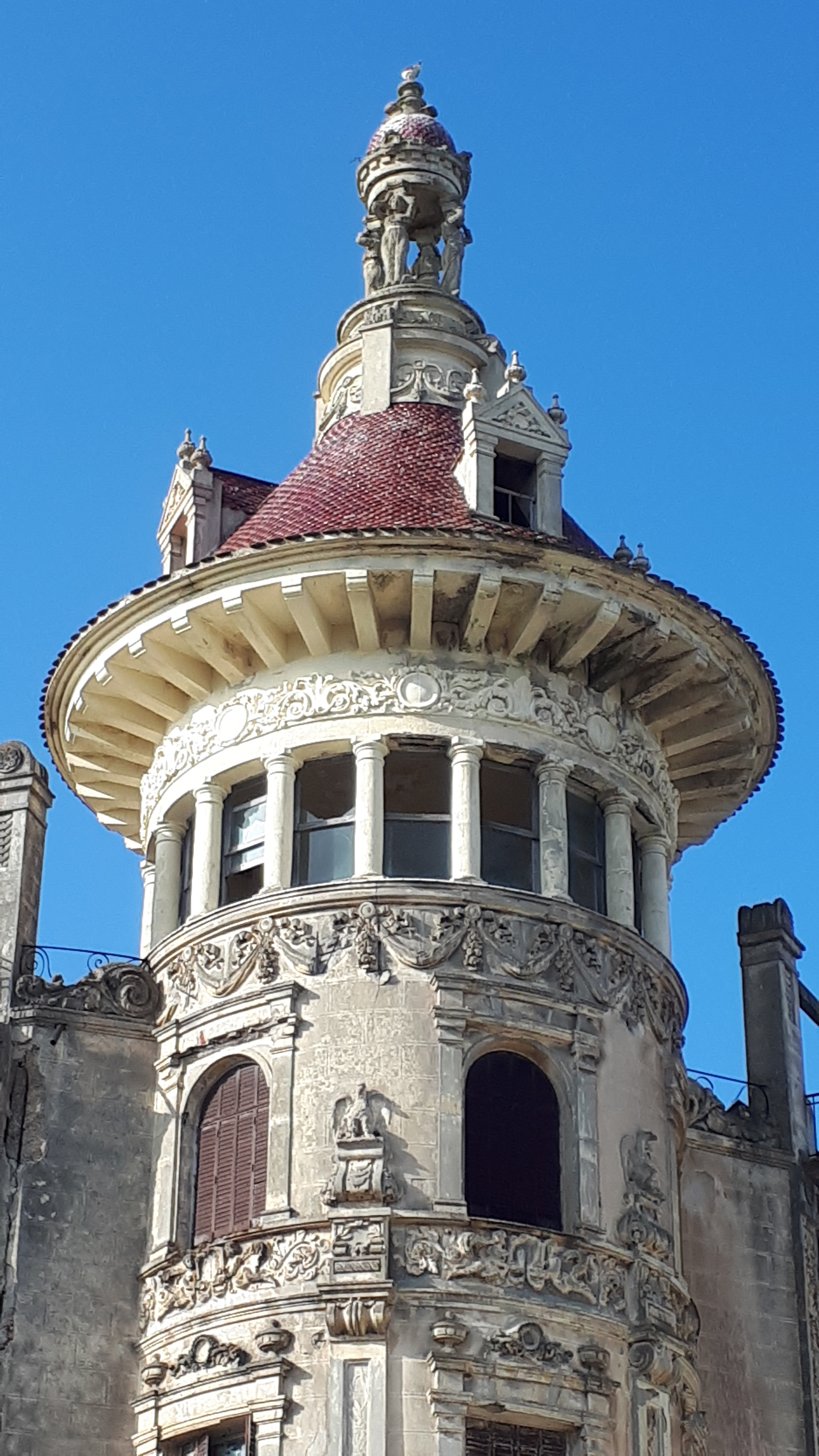
Torre de los Moreno (1915).

- Torre de los Moreno, the house of the Moreno brothers, built in 1915 in an eclectic style. The decoration of the facade suggests Modernism, while that of the rear recalls the neoclassical style. Its concrete and steel construction is unusual.
- The parish church of Santa María do Campo.
- The ruins of an ancient Franciscan convent.
- A number of emblazoned houses in the old quarter.
- Small beaches to the west below the cliffs, including As Catedrais, a popular tourist beach named for the shapes carved into the cliffs by the sea.

== Demography ==
The urban population within the parish is more than 6,500. With contiguous villages and neighbourhoods that fall within other parishes, the population reaches 8,000. The population of the whole municipality is thought to be over 13,000, rather than the figure of just over 10,000 reported in the census. In summer, the population reaches 25,000. It is one of only four municipalities in the province of Lugo to have increased its population in the period 2000–2010.

== Economy ==
The local economy is dominated by the service sector, in particular the retail and hotel trades. There is a fishing and commercial port, the only major port between Ferrol and Avilés.

== People from Ribadeo ==
- Benito Prieto Coussent (1907-2001), painter and sculptor.
- Sonia Castedo (b. 1971), mayor of Alicante.
- Leopoldo Calvo-Sotelo y Bustelo (1926-2008), prime minister of Spain 1981–82.
- José Alonso y Trelles (1857-1924), known as El Viejo Pancho, a leading Uruguayan poet and writer.
- Ramón Fernández Docobo (b. 1962), former footballer, played for SD Compostela in the first division of Spanish football.
- Suso Peña (1941-2005), historian and artist.
- Luz Pozo Garza (1922-2020), poet
