= Eo (river) =

River in Spain

Coordinates: 43.5505°N 7.0311°W

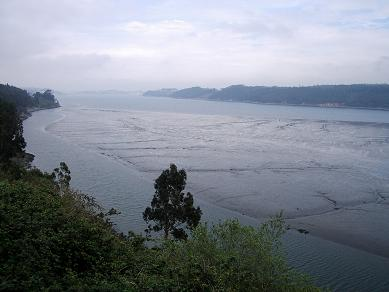
- View of Eo River, Ramsar Site

Location
- Country: Spain

Physical characteristics
- Source
  - location: Baleira
  - elevation: 850 m (2,790 ft)
- Mouth
  - location: Atlantic
- Length: 91.5 km (56.9 mi)
- Basin size: 819 km^{2} (316 sq mi)
- Discharge
  - average: 20.11 m^{3}/s (710 cu ft/s)

Ramsar Wetland
- Official name: Río Eo
- Designated: 4 October 1994
- Reference no.: 705

The Eo is a river, 91 kilometres (57 mi) long, in northwestern Spain. Its estuary forms the boundary between the regions of Galicia and Asturias. The river is known for its salmon fishing.

In the western Cantabrian mountains the river forms the axis of one of Asturias 7 biosphere reserves, the Eo river, Oscos and Terras de Burón Biosphere Reserve.

== See also ==
- List of rivers of Spain
- Rivers of Galicia
