= List of cyclists in the 1947 Vuelta a España =

For the 1947 Vuelta a España, the field consisted of 47 riders; 27 finished the race.

Legend
No.	Starting number worn by the rider during the Vuelta
Pos.	Position in the general classification
DNF	Denotes a rider who did not finish

No.	Name	Nationality	Pos.
1	Jean Engels	Belgium	DNF
2	René Beyens	Belgium	DNF
3	Julien Haemelynck	Belgium	DNF
4	Edward Van Dijck	Belgium	1
5	Rik Renders	Belgium	9
7	Frans Pauwels	Belgium	11
8	Arie Vooren	Netherlands	DNF
9	Cees van de Voorde	Netherlands	16
11	Domenico Pederali	Italy	7
12	Félix Adriano	Italy	8
13	Bruno Bertolucci	Italy	22
14	Adolphe Deledda	Italy	DNF
20	Cipriano Aguirrezabal	Spain	DNF
21	Julián Berrendero	Spain	6
22	Joaquín Olmos	Spain	5
23	Antonio Andrés Sancho	Spain	DNF
24	Manuel Costa	Spain	2
25	Juan Gimeno	Spain	DNF
26	Vicente Carretero	Spain	14
27	Martín Mancisidor	Spain	25
28	José Lahoz	Spain	13
29	José Escolano	Spain	19
30	José Casorrán	Spain	24
31	José Gutiérrez	Spain	DNF
32	José López Gandara	Spain	DNF
33	José Gándara	Spain	DNF
34	Andrés Morán	Spain	21
36	Artur Dorsé	Spain	DNF
37	Joaquin Filba	Spain	DNF
38	Pedro Font	Spain	12
39	José Pérez	Spain	10
40	Pascual Laza	Spain	26
41	Félix Alonso	Spain	DNF
42	Ángel Alonso	Spain	27
43	Senen Blanco	Spain	17
44	Joaquín Jiménez Mata	Spain	18
45	Severino Perez	Spain	DNF
46	Alejandro Fombellida	Spain	23
48	José Antonio Landa	Spain	15
50	Emilio Rodríguez	Spain	4
54	Delio Rodríguez	Spain	3
55	Arturo Ponte	Spain	20
56	Ricardo Ferrandiz	Spain	DNF
57	Senén Mesa	Spain	DNF
58	Bernardo Tomás	Spain	DNF
59	Matias Alemany	Spain	DNF
60	José Marco	Spain	DNF
