= 1947 Vuelta a España, Stage 14 to Stage 24 =

Cycling race stages

The 1947 Vuelta a España was the 7th edition of Vuelta a España, one of cycling's Grand Tours. The Tour began in Madrid on 12 May and Stage 14 occurred on 26 May with a stage from Reinosa. The race finished in Madrid on 5 June.

== Stage 14 ==
27 May 1947 - Reinosa to Gijón, 204 km (126.8 mi)

Stage 14 result

Rank	Rider	Time
1	Delio Rodríguez (ESP)	6h 30' 25"
2	José Lahoz (ESP)	s.t.
3	Frans Pauwels (BEL)	s.t.
4	José Pérez (ESP)	s.t.
5	Andrés Morán (ESP)	s.t.
6	Manuel Costa (ESP)	s.t.
7	Edward Van Dijck (BEL)	+ 36"
8	Rik Renders (BEL)	s.t.
9	Emilio Rodríguez (ESP)	+ 2' 02"
10	Pedro Font (ESP)	+ 2' 20"

General classification after Stage 14

Rank	Rider	Time
1	Manuel Costa (ESP)	82h 15' 47"
2	Edward Van Dijck (BEL)	+ 5' 46"
3	Delio Rodríguez (ESP)	+ 8' 08"
4	Joaquín Olmos (ESP)	+ 15' 00"
5	Félix Adriano (ITA)	+ 20' 14"
6	Emilio Rodríguez (ESP)	+ 30' 57"
7	Julián Berrendero (ESP)	+ 36' 16"
8	Senén Mesa (ESP)	+ 43' 46"
9	Domenico Pederali (ITA)	+ 45' 11"
10	Rik Renders (BEL)	+ 47' 39"

== Stage 15 ==
29 May 1947 - Gijón to Oviedo, 105 km (65 mi)

Stage 15 result

Rank	Rider	Time
1	Delio Rodríguez (ESP)	3h 59' 00"
2	Emilio Rodríguez (ESP)	s.t.
3	Bruno Bertolucci (ITA)	s.t.
4	José Pérez (ESP)	s.t.
5	Julián Berrendero (ESP)	s.t.
6	José Lahoz (ESP)	s.t.
7	Pedro Font (ESP)	s.t.
8	Adolphe Deledda (ITA)	s.t.
9	Senen Blanco (ESP)	s.t.
10	Andrés Morán (ESP)	s.t.

General classification after Stage 15

Rank	Rider	Time
1	Manuel Costa (ESP)	86h 14' 54"
2	Delio Rodríguez (ESP)	+ 8' 08"
3	Edward Van Dijck (BEL)	+ 8' 32"
4	Joaquín Olmos (ESP)	+ 8' 45"
5	Félix Adriano (ITA)	+ 20' 14"
6	Emilio Rodríguez (ESP)	+ 30' 57"
7	Julián Berrendero (ESP)	+ 36' 16"
8	Domenico Pederali (ITA)	+ 45' 11"
9	Rik Renders (BEL)	+ 50' 35"
10	Senén Mesa (ESP)	+ 50' 59"

== Stage 16a ==
30 May 1947 - Oviedo to Luarca, 101 km (63 mi)

Stage 16a result

Rank	Rider	Time
1	Bruno Bertolucci (ITA)	3h 05' 17"
2	Vicente Carretero (ESP)	+ 4' 25"
3	Alejandro Fombellida (ESP)	+ 15' 38"
4	Andrés Morán (ESP)	s.t.
5	Julián Berrendero (ESP)	s.t.
6	Rik Renders (BEL)	s.t.
7	Senén Mesa (ESP)	s.t.
8	Manuel Costa (ESP)	s.t.
9	Cees van de Voorde (NED)	s.t.
10	Delio Rodríguez (ESP)	s.t.

== Stage 16b ==
30 May 1947 - Luarca to Ribadeo, 70 km (43 mi) (ITT)

Stage 16b result

Rank	Rider	Time
1	Edward Van Dijck (BEL)	1h 57' 51"
2	Rik Renders (BEL)	+ 2' 41"
3	Joaquín Olmos (ESP)	+ 3' 46"
4	Emilio Rodríguez (ESP)	+ 4' 24"
5	Julián Berrendero (ESP)	+ 5' 39"
6	Delio Rodríguez (ESP)	+ 6' 20"
7	Pedro Font (ESP)	+ 7' 26"
8	Domenico Pederali (ITA)	+ 7' 46"
9	Frans Pauwels (BEL)	+ 7' 48"
10	Manuel Costa (ESP)	+ 8' 27"

General classification after Stage 16b

Rank	Rider	Time
1	Manuel Costa (ESP)	91h 42' 07"
2	Edward Van Dijck (BEL)	+ 15"
3	Delio Rodríguez (ESP)	+ 5' 51"
4	Joaquín Olmos (ESP)	+ 13' 04"
5	Félix Adriano (ITA)	+ 22' 23"
6	Emilio Rodríguez (ESP)	+ 26' 54"
7	Julián Berrendero (ESP)	+ 33' 28"
8	Domenico Pederali (ITA)	+ 44' 30"
9	Rik Renders (BEL)	+ 44' 49"
10	Senén Mesa (ESP)	+ 58' 42"

== Stage 17 ==
31 May 1947 - Ribadeo to Ferrol, 159 km (99 mi)

Stage 17 result

Rank	Rider	Time
1	Senén Mesa (ESP)	5h 40' 01"
2	Arturo Ponte (ESP)	+ 1' 46"
3	Delio Rodríguez (ESP)	+ 11' 26"
4	Edward Van Dijck (BEL)	s.t.
5	José Pérez (ESP)	s.t.
6	Frans Pauwels (BEL)	s.t.
7	Rik Renders (BEL)	s.t.
8	Manuel Costa (ESP)	s.t.
9	Emilio Rodríguez (ESP)	s.t.
10	Pedro Font (ESP)	s.t.

General classification after Stage 17

Rank	Rider	Time
1	Manuel Costa (ESP)	100h 10' 29"
2	Edward Van Dijck (BEL)	+ 15"
3	Delio Rodríguez (ESP)	+ 5' 51"
4	Joaquín Olmos (ESP)	+ 21' 08"
5	Emilio Rodríguez (ESP)	+ 26' 54"
6	Félix Adriano (ITA)	+ 30' 27"
7	Julián Berrendero (ESP)	+ 41' 32"
8	Rik Renders (BEL)	+ 44' 49"
9	Senén Mesa (ESP)	+ 47' 16"
10	Domenico Pederali (ITA)	+ 52' 34"

== Stage 18 ==
31 May 1947 - Ferrol to A Coruña, 70 km (43 mi)

== Stage 19 ==
1 June 1947 - A Coruña to Vigo, 180 km (110 mi)

Stage 19 result

Rank	Rider	Time
1	Alejandro Fombellida (ESP)	6h 33' 15"
2	Delio Rodríguez (ESP)	s.t.
3	Domenico Pederali (ITA)	s.t.
4	Emilio Rodríguez (ESP)	s.t.
5	José Pérez (ESP)	s.t.
6	Pedro Font (ESP)	s.t.
7	Manuel Costa (ESP)	s.t.
8	Julián Berrendero (ESP)	s.t.
9	Edward Van Dijck (BEL)	+ 2' 06"
10	Rik Renders (BEL)	s.t.

General classification after Stage 19

Rank	Rider	Time
1	Manuel Costa (ESP)	106h 43' 44"
2	Edward Van Dijck (BEL)	+ 2' 21"
3	Delio Rodríguez (ESP)	+ 5' 51"
4	Emilio Rodríguez (ESP)	+ 26' 54"
5	Joaquín Olmos (ESP)	+ 29' 23"
6	Félix Adriano (ITA)	+ 38' 03"
7	Julián Berrendero (ESP)	+ 41' 32"
8	Rik Renders (BEL)	+ 46' 55"
9	Domenico Pederali (ITA)	+ 52' 34"
10	José Pérez (ESP)	+ 1h 10' 35"

== Stage 20 ==
2 June 1947 - Vigo to Ourense, 105 km (65 mi)

Stage 20 result

Rank	Rider	Time
1	Félix Adriano (ITA)	2h 56' 50"
2	Emilio Rodríguez (ESP)	s.t.
3	Andrés Morán (ESP)	s.t.
4	Delio Rodríguez (ESP)	+ 2' 07"
5	Bruno Bertolucci (ITA)	s.t.
6	José Lahoz (ESP)	s.t.
7	Domenico Pederali (ITA)	s.t.
8	José Antonio Landa (ESP)	s.t.
9	Manuel Costa (ESP)	s.t.
10	Rik Renders (BEL)	s.t.

== Stage 21 ==
3 June 1947 - Ourense to Astorga, 228 km (142 mi)

Stage 21 result

Rank	Rider	Time
1	Alejandro Fombellida (ESP)	8h 21' 33"
2	Domenico Pederali (ITA)	s.t.
3	Joaquín Olmos (ESP)	+ 2' 12"
4	Joaquín Jiménez Mata (ESP)	s.t.
5	José Pérez (ESP)	s.t.
6	Edward Van Dijck (BEL)	s.t.
7	Frans Pauwels (BEL)	s.t.
8	Bruno Bertolucci (ITA)	s.t.
9	Julián Berrendero (ESP)	s.t.
10	Manuel Costa (ESP)	s.t.

General classification after Stage 21

Rank	Rider	Time
1	Manuel Costa (ESP)	119h 06' 26"
2	Edward Van Dijck (BEL)	+ 6' 01"
3	Delio Rodríguez (ESP)	s.t.
4	Emilio Rodríguez (ESP)	s.t.
5	Joaquín Olmos (ESP)	+ 38' 25"
6	Julián Berrendero (ESP)	+ 41' 32"
7	Domenico Pederali (ITA)	+ 50' 22"
8	Félix Adriano (ITA)	+ 50' 31"
9	Rik Renders (BEL)	+ 54' 32"
10	José Pérez (ESP)	+ 1h 14' 00"

== Stage 22 ==
4 June 1947 - Astorga to León, 47 km (29 mi) (ITT)

Stage 22 result

Rank	Rider	Time
1	Edward Van Dijck (BEL)	1h 02' 36"
2	Julián Berrendero (ESP)	+ 2' 55"
3	Pedro Font (ESP)	s.t.
4	Domenico Pederali (ITA)	+ 3' 15"
5	Emilio Rodríguez (ESP)	+ 3' 29"
6	Félix Adriano (ITA)	+ 3' 35"
7	José Pérez (ESP)	+ 3' 39"
8	Joaquín Olmos (ESP)	+ 3' 41"
9	Delio Rodríguez (ESP)	+ 4' 14"
10	Vicente Carretero (ESP)	+ 4' 26"

== Stage 23 ==
4 June 1947 - León to Valladolid, 133 km (83 mi)

Stage 23 result

Rank	Rider	Time
1	Delio Rodríguez (ESP)	4h 29' 10"
2	Joaquín Jiménez Mata (ESP)	s.t.
3	Vicente Carretero (ESP)	s.t.
4	Domenico Pederali (ITA)	s.t.
5	Ángel Alonso (ESP)	s.t.
6	Martín Mancisidor (ESP)	s.t.
7	Andrés Morán (ESP)	s.t.
8	José Escolano (ESP)	s.t.
9	Andrés Morán (ESP)	s.t.
10	Cees van de Voorde (NED)	s.t.

General classification after Stage 23

Rank	Rider	Time
1	Edward Van Dijck (BEL)	124h 40' 33"
2	Manuel Costa (ESP)	+ 2' 14"
3	Delio Rodríguez (ESP)	+ 7' 39"
4	Emilio Rodríguez (ESP)	+ 27' 55"
5	Joaquín Olmos (ESP)	+ 39' 45"
6	Julián Berrendero (ESP)	+ 40' 30"
7	Domenico Pederali (ITA)	+ 51' 16"
8	Félix Adriano (ITA)	+ 51' 45"
9	Rik Renders (BEL)	+ 1h 04' 30"
10	José Pérez (ESP)	+ 1h 16' 18"

== Stage 24 ==
5 June 1947 - Valladolid to Madrid, 220 km (140 mi)

Stage 24 result

Rank	Rider	Time
1	Joaquín Olmos (ESP)	7h 46' 27"
2	Cees van de Voorde (NED)	s.t.
3	Julián Berrendero (ESP)	s.t.
4	Rik Renders (BEL)	s.t.
5	Edward Van Dijck (BEL)	s.t.
6	Joaquín Jiménez Mata (ESP)	s.t.
7	Emilio Rodríguez (ESP)	s.t.
8	Manuel Costa (ESP)	s.t.
9	Vicente Carretero (ESP)	+ 1' 42"
10	Domenico Pederali (ITA)	s.t.

General classification after Stage 24

Rank	Rider	Time
1	Edward Van Dijck (BEL)	132h 27' 00"
2	Manuel Costa (ESP)	+ 2' 14"
3	Delio Rodríguez (ESP)	+ 11' 04"
4	Emilio Rodríguez (ESP)	+ 25' 55"
5	Joaquín Olmos (ESP)	+ 39' 45"
6	Julián Berrendero (ESP)	+ 40' 30"
7	Domenico Pederali (ITA)	+ 52' 58"
8	Félix Adriano (ITA)	+ 1h 00' 09"
9	Rik Renders (BEL)	+ 1h 04' 30"
10	José Pérez (ESP)	+ 1h 18' 55"
