= 1947 Vuelta a España, Stage 1 to Stage 13 =

Cycling race stages

The 1947 Vuelta a España was the 7th edition of Vuelta a España, one of cycling's Grand Tours. The Tour began in Madrid on 12 May and Stage 13 occurred on 25 May with a stage to Reinosa. The race finished in Madrid on 5 June.

== Stage 1 ==
12 May 1947 - Madrid to Albacete, 243 km (151.0 mi)

Stage 1 result and General Classification after Stage 1

Rank	Rider	Time
1	Delio Rodríguez (ESP)	7h 20' 07"
2	Arie Vooren (NED)	+ 47"
3	Emilio Rodríguez (ESP)	s.t.
4	Joaquín Olmos (ESP)	s.t.
5	Manuel Costa (ESP)	+ 8"
6	Julien Haemelynck (BEL)	+ 46"
7	Jean Engels (BEL)	+ 48"
8	Adolphe Deledda (ITA)	s.t.
9	René Beyens (BEL)	s.t.
10	Edward Van Dijck (BEL)	s.t.

== Stage 2 ==
13 May 1947 - Albacete to Murcia, 146 km (90.7 mi)

Stage 2 result

Rank	Rider	Time
1	Emilio Rodríguez (ESP)	4h 07' 35"
2	Delio Rodríguez (ESP)	s.t.
3	Bruno Bertolucci (ITA)	s.t.
4	Julián Berrendero (ESP)	s.t.
5	Julien Haemelynck (BEL)	s.t.
6	Edward Van Dijck (BEL)	+ 1' 19"
7	Adolphe Deledda (ITA)	s.t.
8	Alejandro Fombellida (ESP)	s.t.
9	Cees van de Voorde (NED)	s.t.
10	Arie Vooren (NED)	s.t.

General classification after Stage 2

Rank	Rider	Time
1	Delio Rodríguez (ESP)	11h 27' 42"
2	Emilio Rodríguez (ESP)	s.t.
3	Julien Haemelynck (BEL)	+ 46"
4	Arie Vooren (NED)	+ 1' 19"
5	Adolphe Deledda (ITA)	+ 2' 07"
6	Edward Van Dijck (BEL)	s.t.
7	René Beyens (BEL)	s.t.
8	Julián Berrendero (ESP)	+ 6' 10"
9	Joaquín Olmos (ESP)	+ 7' 01"
10	Manuel Costa (ESP)	+ 7' 09"

== Stage 3 ==
14 May 1947 - Murcia to Alcoy, 135 km (84 mi)

Stage 3 result

Rank	Rider	Time
1	Julián Berrendero (ESP)	5h 03' 35"
2	Edward Van Dijck (BEL)	+ 2' 42"
3	Delio Rodríguez (ESP)	s.t.
4	José López Gandara (ESP)	+ 3' 02"
5	Arie Vooren (NED)	+ 4' 16"
6	Alejandro Fombellida (ESP)	+ 5' 08"
7	Félix Adriano (ITA)	s.t.
8	Joaquín Olmos (ESP)	+ 5' 16"
9	Senén Mesa (ESP)	+ 5' 25"
10	Emilio Rodríguez (ESP)	+ 5' 40"

General classification after Stage 3

Rank	Rider	Time
1	Delio Rodríguez (ESP)	16h 33' 59"
2	Edward Van Dijck (BEL)	+ 2' 07"
3	Emilio Rodríguez (ESP)	+ 2' 58"
4	Julián Berrendero (ESP)	+ 5' 28"
5	Julien Haemelynck (BEL)	+ 7' 50"
6	Arie Vooren (NED)	+ 8' 35"
7	Joaquín Olmos (ESP)	+ 9' 35"
8	Alejandro Fombellida (ESP)	+ 12' 01"
9	Manuel Costa (ESP)	+ 12' 16"
10	José López Gandara (ESP)	+ 13' 38"

== Stage 4 ==
15 May 1947 - Alcoy to Castellón, 175 km (109 mi)

Stage 4 result

Rank	Rider	Time
1	Adolphe Deledda (ITA)	5h 20' 04"
2	José Gutiérrez (ESP)	+ 11"
3	Ricardo Ferrandiz (ESP)	+ 1' 22"
4	Andrés Morán (ESP)	s.t.
5	José Pérez (ESP)	s.t.
6	Senén Mesa (ESP)	+ 3' 14"
7	Vicente Carretero (ESP)	+ 9' 29"
8	Joaquín Olmos (ESP)	s.t.
9	Artur Dorsé (ESP)	s.t.
10	Martín Mancisidor (ESP)	s.t.

== Stage 5 ==
16 May 1947 - Castellón to Tarragona, 222 km (138 mi)

Stage 5 result

Rank	Rider	Time
1	Delio Rodríguez (ESP)	7h 32' 34"
2	Emilio Rodríguez (ESP)	s.t.
3	Félix Adriano (ITA)	s.t.
4	Julián Berrendero (ESP)	s.t.
5	René Beyens (BEL)	s.t.
6	Adolphe Deledda (ITA)	s.t.
7	José Pérez (ESP)	s.t.
8	Andrés Morán (ESP)	s.t.
9	Edward Van Dijck (BEL)	s.t.
10	Cipriano Aguirrezabal (ESP)	s.t.

General classification after Stage 5

Rank	Rider	Time
1	Delio Rodríguez (ESP)	29h 36' 11"
2	Edward Van Dijck (BEL)	+ 2' 07"
3	Emilio Rodríguez (ESP)	+ 2' 58"
4	Julián Berrendero (ESP)	+ 5' 28"
5	Julien Haemelynck (BEL)	+ 7' 50"
6	Joaquín Olmos (ESP)	+ 9' 35"
7	José Pérez (ESP)	+ 10' 29"
8	Senén Mesa (ESP)	+ 11' 45"
9	Manuel Costa (ESP)	+ 12' 19"
10	Adolphe Deledda (ITA)	+ 14' 01"

== Stage 6 ==
18 May 1947 - Tarragona to Barcelona, 119 km (74 mi)

Stage 6 result

Rank	Rider	Time
1	Cipriano Aguirrezabal (ESP)	4h 14' 06"
2	Edward Van Dijck (BEL)	s.t.
3	Domenico Pederali (ITA)	s.t.
4	Delio Rodríguez (ESP)	s.t.
5	José Pérez (ESP)	s.t.
6	René Beyens (BEL)	s.t.
7	Julien Haemelynck (BEL)	s.t.
8	Rik Renders (BEL)	s.t.
9	Frans Pauwels (BEL)	s.t.
10	Cees van de Voorde (NED)	s.t.

General classification after Stage 6

Rank	Rider	Time
1	Delio Rodríguez (ESP)	33h 50' 12"
2	Edward Van Dijck (BEL)	+ 2' 11"
3	Emilio Rodríguez (ESP)	+ 3' 02"
4	Julián Berrendero (ESP)	+ 3' 32"
5	Julien Haemelynck (BEL)	+ 7' 53"
6	Joaquín Olmos (ESP)	+ 10' 02"
7	José Pérez (ESP)	+ 10' 33"
8	Manuel Costa (ESP)	+ 12' 14"
9	Senén Mesa (ESP)	+ 12' 49"
10	Adolphe Deledda (ITA)	+ 14' 05"

== Stage 7 ==
19 May 1947 - Barcelona to Lleida, 162 km (101 mi)

Stage 7 result

Rank	Rider	Time
1	Cipriano Aguirrezabal (ESP)	5h 09' 20"
2	Domenico Pederali (ITA)	s.t.
3	René Beyens (BEL)	s.t.
4	Delio Rodríguez (ESP)	s.t.
5	Ángel Alonso (ESP)	s.t.
6	Arturo Ponte (ESP)	s.t.
7	Pedro Font (ESP)	s.t.
8	Félix Alonso (ESP)	s.t.
9	José López Gandara (ESP)	s.t.
10	Joaquín Jiménez Mata (ESP)	s.t.

== Stage 8 ==
20 May 1947 - Lleida to Zaragoza, 144 km (89 mi)

Stage 8 result

Rank	Rider	Time
1	Delio Rodríguez (ESP)	4h 54' 29"
2	Emilio Rodríguez (ESP)	s.t.
3	Domenico Pederali (ITA)	s.t.
4	Vicente Carretero (ESP)	s.t.
5	Adolphe Deledda (ITA)	s.t.
6	Edward Van Dijck (BEL)	s.t.
7	Frans Pauwels (BEL)	s.t.
8	Cees van de Voorde (NED)	s.t.
9	Félix Adriano (ITA)	s.t.
10	Bruno Bertolucci (ITA)	s.t.

General classification after Stage 8

Rank	Rider	Time
1	Delio Rodríguez (ESP)	43h 54' 05"
2	Edward Van Dijck (BEL)	+ 2' 07"
3	Emilio Rodríguez (ESP)	+ 2' 57"
4	Julián Berrendero (ESP)	+ 6' 41"
5	José Pérez (ESP)	+ 10' 29"
6	Julien Haemelynck (BEL)	+ 10' 39"
7	Manuel Costa (ESP)	+ 12' 19"
8	Senén Mesa (ESP)	+ 12' 45"
9	Joaquín Olmos (ESP)	+ 12' 46"
10	Adolphe Deledda (ITA)	+ 14' 01"

== Stage 9 ==
21 May 1947 - Zaragoza to Pamplona, 176 km (109 mi)

Stage 9 result

Rank	Rider	Time
1	Félix Adriano (ITA)	7h 27' 28"
2	Adolphe Deledda (ITA)	s.t.
3	Domenico Pederali (ITA)	+ 1' 01"
4	Cipriano Aguirrezabal (ESP)	s.t.
5	Alejandro Fombellida (ESP)	s.t.
6	Vicente Carretero (ESP)	s.t.
7	Jean Engels (BEL)	s.t.
8	Joaquín Olmos (ESP)	s.t.
9	René Beyens (BEL)	s.t.
10	Julien Haemelynck (BEL)	s.t.

General classification after Stage 9

Rank	Rider	Time
1	Delio Rodríguez (ESP)	51h 22' 34"
2	Edward Van Dijck (BEL)	+ 2' 07"
3	Emilio Rodríguez (ESP)	+ 2' 58"
4	Julián Berrendero (ESP)	+ 6' 41"
5	José Pérez (ESP)	+ 10' 29"
6	Julien Haemelynck (BEL)	+ 10' 39"
7	Manuel Costa (ESP)	+ 12' 19"
8	Senén Mesa (ESP)	+ 12' 45"
9	Joaquín Olmos (ESP)	+ 12' 47"
10	Adolphe Deledda (ITA)	+ 13' 00"

== Stage 10 ==
22 May 1947 - Pamplona to San Sebastián, 107 km (66 mi)

Stage 10 result

Rank	Rider	Time
1	Delio Rodríguez (ESP)	3h 12' 13"
2	Cees van de Voorde (NED)	s.t.
3	Alejandro Fombellida (ESP)	s.t.
4	Vicente Carretero (ESP)	s.t.
5	Rik Renders (BEL)	s.t.
6	José Lahoz (ESP)	s.t.
7	Edward Van Dijck (BEL)	s.t.
8	Emilio Rodríguez (ESP)	s.t.
9	Julián Berrendero (ESP)	s.t.
10	Julien Haemelynck (BEL)	s.t.

General classification after Stage 10

Rank	Rider	Time
1	Delio Rodríguez (ESP)	54h 34' 47"
2	Edward Van Dijck (BEL)	+ 2' 07"
3	Emilio Rodríguez (ESP)	+ 2' 58"
4	Julián Berrendero (ESP)	+ 6' 41"
5	Julien Haemelynck (BEL)	+ 10' 39"
6	Manuel Costa (ESP)	+ 12' 17"
7	Senén Mesa (ESP)	+ 12' 47"
8	Joaquín Olmos (ESP)	s.t.
9	José Pérez (ESP)	+ 14' 26"
10	Jean Engels (BEL)	+ 19' 13"

== Stage 11 ==
24 May 1947 - San Sebastián to Bilbao, 229 km (142 mi)

Stage 11 result

Rank	Rider	Time
1	Félix Adriano (ITA)	8h 06' 30"
2	Manuel Costa (ESP)	s.t.
3	Martín Mancisidor (ESP)	s.t.
4	Pedro Font (ESP)	s.t.
5	Joaquín Olmos (ESP)	+ 1' 44"
6	Delio Rodríguez (ESP)	s.t.
7	Domenico Pederali (ITA)	+ 3' 10"
8	José Antonio Landa (ESP)	s.t.
9	Cipriano Aguirrezabal (ESP)	+ 5' 50"
10	José Escolano (ESP)	+ 7' 34"

General classification after Stage 11

Rank	Rider	Time
1	Delio Rodríguez (ESP)	62h 45' 01"
2	Edward Van Dijck (BEL)	+ 5' 07"
3	Emilio Rodríguez (ESP)	+ 6' 48"
4	Manuel Costa (ESP)	+ 7' 37"
5	Joaquín Olmos (ESP)	+ 10' 47"
6	José Pérez (ESP)	+ 20' 16"
7	Julián Berrendero (ESP)	+ 20' 17"
8	Senén Mesa (ESP)	+ 20' 59"
9	Félix Adriano (ITA)	+ 25' 04"
10	José Lahoz (ESP)	+ 29' 25"

== Stage 12 ==
25 May 1947 - Bilbao to Santander, 212 km (132 mi)

Stage 12 result

Rank	Rider	Time
1	Félix Adriano (ITA)	7h 58' 29"
2	Manuel Costa (ESP)	s.t.
3	Joaquín Olmos (ESP)	+ 7' 39"
4	Rik Renders (BEL)	s.t.
5	Edward Van Dijck (BEL)	s.t.
6	Julián Berrendero (ESP)	+ 8' 03"
7	Delio Rodríguez (ESP)	+ 17' 39"
8	Domenico Pederali (ITA)	+ 18' 03"
9	Senén Mesa (ESP)	+ 19' 02"
10	Emilio Rodríguez (ESP)	+ 29' 38"

General classification after Stage 12

Rank	Rider	Time
1	Manuel Costa (ESP)	70h 52' 05"
2	Edward Van Dijck (BEL)	+ 5' 01"
3	Delio Rodríguez (ESP)	+ 7' 04"
4	Joaquín Olmos (ESP)	+ 9' 51"
5	Félix Adriano (ITA)	+ 17' 22"
6	Julián Berrendero (ESP)	+ 19' 37"
7	Emilio Rodríguez (ESP)	+ 27' 51"
8	Senén Mesa (ESP)	+ 31' 26"
9	José Pérez (ESP)	+ 39' 19"
10	Domenico Pederali (ITA)	+ 41' 15"

== Stage 13 ==
26 May 1947 - Santander to Reinosa, 201 km (125 mi)

Stage 13 result

Rank	Rider	Time
1	Joaquín Jiménez Mata (ESP)	4h 53' 17"
2	Félix Adriano (ITA)	s.t.
3	Edward Van Dijck (BEL)	s.t.
4	Senén Mesa (ESP)	s.t.
5	Manuel Costa (ESP)	s.t.
6	Rik Renders (BEL)	s.t.
7	Andrés Morán (ESP)	s.t.
8	José Lahoz (ESP)	s.t.
9	Alejandro Fombellida (ESP)	+ 1' 04"
10	Vicente Carretero (ESP)	s.t.
