= List of Vuelta a España Gran Partidas =

The Vuelta a España is an annual road bicycle race currently held over 23 days in August and September. Up until the 1995 edition the race was held during April and May. Established in 1935, the Vuelta is one of cycling's three "Grand Tours"; the others are the Tour de France and the Giro d'Italia. The race usually passes through Spain and neighboring countries. The race is broken into day-long segments, called stages. Individual finishing times for each stage are totaled to determine the overall winner at the end of the race.

== Host cities ==
Vuelta a España Gran Partida hosts
Year	Country	Region	Gran Partida host	Winning rider
1935	Spain	Community of Madrid	Madrid	Gustaaf Deloor (BEL)
1936	Spain	Community of Madrid	Madrid	Gustaaf Deloor (BEL)
1937	—	—	—	—
1938	—	—	—	—
1939	—	—	—	—
1940	—	—	—	—
1941	Spain	Community of Madrid	Madrid	Julián Berrendero (ESP)
1942	Spain	Community of Madrid	Madrid	Julián Berrendero (ESP)
1943	—	—	—	—
1944	—	—	—	—
1945	Spain	Community of Madrid	Madrid	Delio Rodríguez (ESP)
1946	Spain	Community of Madrid	Madrid	Dalmacio Langarica (ESP)
1947	Spain	Community of Madrid	Madrid	Edouard Van Dyck (BEL)
1948	Spain	Community of Madrid	Madrid	Bernardo Ruiz (SPA)
1949	—	—	—	—
1950	Spain	Community of Madrid	Madrid	Emilio Rodríguez (SPA)
1951	—	—	—	—
1952	—	—	—	—
1953	—	—	—	—
1954	—	—	—	—
1955	Spain	(Basque Country (autonomous community)) Basque Country	Bilbao	Jean Dotto (FRA)
1956	Spain	(Basque Country (autonomous community)) Basque Country	Bilbao	Angelo Conterno (ITA)
1957	Spain	(Basque Country (autonomous community)) Basque Country	Bilbao	Jesús Loroño (SPA)
1958	Spain	(Basque Country (autonomous community)) Basque Country	Bilbao	Jean Stablinski (FRA)
1959	Spain	Community of Madrid	Madrid	Antonio Suárez (SPA)
1960	Spain	Asturias	Gijón	Frans De Mulder (BEL)
1961	Spain	(Basque Country (autonomous community)) Basque Country	San Sebastián	Angelino Soler (SPA)
1962	Spain	Catalonia	Barcelona	Rudi Altig (FRG)
1963	Spain	Asturias	Gijón	Jacques Anquetil (FRA)
1964	Spain	Valencian Community	Benidorm	Raymond Poulidor (FRA)
1965	Spain	(Galicia (Spain)) Galicia	Vigo	Rolf Wolfshohl (FRG)
1966	Spain	(Region of Murcia) Murcia	Murcia	Francisco Gabica (ESP)
1967	Spain	(Galicia (Spain)) Galicia	Vigo	Jan Janssen (NED)
1968	Spain	Aragon	Zaragoza	Felice Gimondi (ITA)
1969	Spain	Extremadura	Badajoz	Roger Pingeon (FRA)
1970	Spain	Andalusia	Cádiz	Luis Ocaña (SPA)
1971	Spain	Andalusia	Almería	Ferdinand Bracke (BEL)
1972	Spain	Andalusia	Fuengirola	José Manuel Fuente (SPA)
1973	Spain	Valencian Community	Calp	Eddy Merckx (BEL)
1974	Spain	Andalusia	Almería	José Manuel Fuente (SPA)
1975	Spain	Andalusia	Fuengirola	Agustín Tamames (SPA)
1976	Spain	Andalusia	Estepona	José Pesarrodona (SPA)
1977	Spain	Valencian Community	Dehesa de Campoamor	Freddy Maertens (BEL)
1978	Spain	Asturias	Gijón	Bernard Hinault (FRA)
1979	Spain	Andalusia	Jerez de la Frontera	Joop Zoetemelk (NED)
1980	Spain	Murcia	La Manga	Faustino Rupérez (SPA)
1981	Spain	Cantabria	Santander	Giovanni Battaglin (ITA)
1982	Spain	(Galicia (Spain)) Galicia	Santiago de Compostela	Marino Lejarreta (SPA)
1983	Spain	Valencian Community	Almussafes	Bernard Hinault (FRA)
1984	Spain	Andalusia	Jerez de la Frontera	Éric Caritoux (FRA)
1985	Spain	Castile and León	Valladolid	Pedro Delgado (SPA)
1986	Spain	Balearic Islands	Palma de Mallorca	Álvaro Pino (SPA)
1987	Spain	Valencian Community	Benidorm	Luis Herrera (COL)
1988	Spain	Canary Islands	Santa Cruz de Tenerife	Sean Kelly (IRL)
1989	Spain	(Galicia (Spain)) Galicia	A Coruña	Pedro Delgado (SPA)
1990	Spain	Valencian Community	Benicàssim	Marco Giovannetti (ITA)
1991	Spain	Extremadura	Mérida	Melcior Mauri (ESP)
1992	Spain	Andalusia	Jerez de la Frontera	Tony Rominger (SUI)
1993	Spain	(Galicia (Spain)) Galicia	A Coruña	Tony Rominger (SUI)
1994	Spain	Castile and León	Valladolid	Tony Rominger (SUI)
1995	Spain	Aragon	Zaragoza	Laurent Jalabert (FRA)
1996	Spain	Valencian Community	Valencia	Alex Zülle (SUI)
1997	Portugal	Lisbon	Lisbon	Alex Zülle (SUI)
1998	Spain	Andalusia	Córdoba	Abraham Olano (ESP)
1999	Spain	Murcia	Murcia	Abraham Olano (ESP)
2000	Spain	Andalusia	Málaga	Roberto Heras (ESP)
2001	Spain	Castile and León	Salamanca	Ángel Casero (ESP)
2002	Spain	Valencian Community	Valencia	Aitor González (ESP)
2003	Spain	Asturias	Gijón	Roberto Heras (ESP)
2004	Spain	Castile and León	León	Roberto Heras (ESP)
2005	Spain	Andalusia	Granada	Roberto Heras (ESP) (Note: Roberto Heras was the winner at the podium ceremony in Madrid on the last day of the 2005 Vuelta a España, but subsequently was found to have tested positive for performance-enhancing drugs during stage 20 of the race. The Spanish cycling federation found him guilty of using erythropoietin during the race and stripped him of his title, awarding the win to Denis Menchov. However, in 2012 Roberto Heras was reinstated as the 2005 Vuelta a España champion when Spain's supreme court ruled in favor of Heras, citing procedural violations relating to the storage and handling of the urine samples.)
2006	Spain	Andalusia	Málaga	Alexander Vinokourov (KAZ)
2007	Spain	(Galicia (Spain)) Galicia	Vigo	Denis Menchov (RUS)
2008	Spain	Andalusia	Granada	Alberto Contador (SPA)
2009	Netherlands	Drenthe	Assen	Alejandro Valverde (SPA)
2010	Spain	Andalusia	Seville	Vincenzo Nibali (ITA)
2011	Spain	Valencian Community	Benidorm	Chris Froome (GBR) (Note: Juan José Cobo was the winner of the 2011 Vuelta a España, but had been found guilty of an anti-doping violation, according to findings from his biological passport. As a result, the UCI penalised him with a three-year period of ineligibility. Cobo was officially stripped of the title on 18 June 2019. On 17 July 2019, as the time for Cobo to appeal the decision expired with no application, the UCI announced it recognised Chris Froome as the 2011 champion, making him retroactively the first Briton to win a Grand Tour)
2012	Spain	Navarre	Pamplona	Alberto Contador (SPA)
2013	Spain	(Galicia (Spain)) Galicia	Vilanova de Arousa	Chris Horner (USA)
2014	Spain	Andalusia	Jerez de la Frontera	Alberto Contador (SPA)
2015	Spain	Andalusia	Puerto Banús	Fabio Aru (ITA)
2016	Spain	(Galicia (Spain)) Galicia	Ourense	Nairo Quintana (COL)
2017	France	(Occitania (administrative region)) Occitania	Nîmes	Chris Froome (GBR)
2018	Spain	Andalusia	Málaga	Simon Yates (GBR)
2019	Spain	Valencian Community	Salinas de Torrevieja	Primož Roglič (SLO)
2020 (Note: The start of the Vuelta 2020 was planned in Utrecht (the Netherlands), but due the COVID-19 pandemic it was moved to Irun)	Spain	Euskadi	Irun	Primož Roglič (SLO)
2021	Spain	Castile and León	Burgos	Primož Roglič (SLO)
2022	Netherlands	(Utrecht (province)) Utrecht	Utrecht	Remco Evenepoel (BEL)
2023	Spain	Catalonia	Barcelona	Sepp Kuss (USA)
2024	Portugal	Lisbon	Lisbon	Primož Roglič (SLO)
2025	Italy	Piedmont	Turin	Jonas Vingegaard (DEN)
2026	Monaco	Monaco	Monaco	Enric Mas (SPA)

== Countries that have hosted La Gran Partida ==
Countries that have hosted La Gran Partida
No.	Country	Cities
2	Portugal	Lisbon (2)
2	Netherlands	Assen, Utrecht
1	France	Nîmes
1	Italy	Turin
1	Monaco	Monte Carlo

== See also ==
- List of Vuelta a España classification winners
- Red jersey statistics
- List of Grand Tour general classification winners
