= List of Vuelta a España classification winners =

Since 1935, and annually since 1955, the Vuelta a España has been the most important multiday cycle racing event in Spain. In the 63 editions of the race, riders from eleven countries have won the general classification. A mountains classification has been held every edition too, while the first points classification was held in 1945 and annually since 1955. Madrid has staged the most Vuelta-starts and finishes, and has been the regular finish city since 1994.

== By year ==
Vuelta	Year		Overall		Points		Mountains		Combination		Young rider
81	2026	(Spain)	Enric Mas	(Belgium)	Wout van Aert	(Colombia)	Santiaguo Buitrago			(United Kingdom)	Oscar Onley
80	2025	(Denmark)	Jonas Vingegaard	(Belgium)	Jasper Philipsen	(Australia)	Jay Vine			(United States)	Matthew Ricitello
79	2024	(Slovenia)	Primož Roglič	(Australia)	Kaden Groves	(Australia)	Jay Vine			(Denmark)	Mattias Skjelmose
78	2023	(United States)	Sepp Kuss	(Australia)	Kaden Groves	(Belgium)	Remco Evenepoel			(Spain)	Juan Ayuso
77	2022	(Belgium)	Remco Evenepoel	(Denmark)	Mads Pedersen	(Ecuador)	Richard Carapaz			(Belgium)	Remco Evenepoel
76	2021	(Slovenia)	Primož Roglič	(Netherlands)	Fabio Jakobsen	(Australia)	Michael Storer			(Switzerland)	Gino Mäder
75	2020	(Slovenia)	Primož Roglič	(Slovenia)	Primož Roglič	(France)	Guillaume Martin			(Spain)	Enric Mas
74	2019	(Slovenia)	Primož Roglič	(Slovenia)	Primož Roglič	(France)	Geoffrey Bouchard			(Slovenia)	Tadej Pogačar
73	2018	(United Kingdom)	Simon Yates	(Spain)	Alejandro Valverde	(Belgium)	Thomas De Gendt	(United Kingdom)	Simon Yates	(Spain)	Enric Mas
72	2017	(United Kingdom)	Chris Froome	(United Kingdom)	Chris Froome	(Italy)	Davide Villella	(United Kingdom)	Chris Froome	(Colombia)	Miguel Ángel López
71	2016	(Colombia)	Nairo Quintana	(Italy)	Fabio Felline	(Spain)	Omar Fraile	(Colombia)	Nairo Quintana		
70	2015	(Italy)	Fabio Aru	(Spain)	Alejandro Valverde	(Spain)	Omar Fraile	(Spain)	Joaquim Rodríguez		
69	2014	(Spain)	Alberto Contador	(Germany)	John Degenkolb	(Spain)	Luis León Sánchez	(Spain)	Alberto Contador		
68	2013	(United States)	Chris Horner	(Spain)	Alejandro Valverde	(France)	Nicolas Edet	(United States)	Chris Horner		
67	2012	(Spain)	Alberto Contador	(Spain)	Alejandro Valverde	(Australia)	Simon Clarke	(Spain)	Alejandro Valverde		
66	2011	(United Kingdom)	Chris Froome	(Netherlands)	Bauke Mollema	(France)	David Moncoutié	(United Kingdom)	Chris Froome		
65	2010	(Italy)	Vincenzo Nibali	(United Kingdom)	Mark Cavendish	(France)	David Moncoutié	(Italy)	Vincenzo Nibali		
64	2009	(Spain)	Alejandro Valverde	(Germany)	André Greipel	(France)	David Moncoutié	(Spain)	Alejandro Valverde		
63	2008	(Spain)	Alberto Contador	(Belgium)	Greg Van Avermaet	(France)	David Moncoutié	(Spain)	Alberto Contador		
62	2007	(Russia)	Denis Menchov	(Italy)	Daniele Bennati	(Russia)	Denis Menchov	(Russia)	Denis Menchov		
61	2006	(Kazakhstan)	Alexandre Vinokourov	(Norway)	Thor Hushovd	(Spain)	Egoi Martínez	(Kazakhstan)	Alexandre Vinokourov		
60	2005	(Spain)	Roberto Heras	(Italy)	Alessandro Petacchi	(Spain)	Joaquim Rodríguez	(Spain)	Roberto Heras		
59	2004	(Spain)	Roberto Heras	(Germany)	Erik Zabel	(Colombia)	Félix Cárdenas	(Spain)	Roberto Heras		
58	2003	(Spain)	Roberto Heras	(Germany)	Erik Zabel	(Colombia)	Félix Cárdenas	(Spain)	Alejandro Valverde		
57	2002	(Spain)	Aitor González	(Germany)	Erik Zabel	(Spain)	Aitor Osa	(Spain)	Roberto Heras		
56	2001	(Spain)	Ángel Casero	(Spain)	José María Jiménez	(Spain)	José María Jiménez				
55	2000	(Spain)	Roberto Heras	(Spain)	Roberto Heras	(Spain)	Carlos Sastre				
54	1999	(Germany)	Jan Ullrich	(Belgium)	Frank Vandenbroucke	(Spain)	José María Jiménez				
53	1998	(Spain)	Abraham Olano	(Italy)	Fabrizio Guidi	(Spain)	José María Jiménez				
52	1997	(Switzerland)	Alex Zülle	(France)	Laurent Jalabert	(Spain)	José María Jiménez				
51	1996	(Switzerland)	Alex Zülle	(France)	Laurent Jalabert	(Switzerland)	Tony Rominger				
50	1995	(France)	Laurent Jalabert	(France)	Laurent Jalabert	(France)	Laurent Jalabert				
49	1994	(Switzerland)	Tony Rominger	(France)	Laurent Jalabert	(France)	Luc Leblanc				
48	1993	(Switzerland)	Tony Rominger	(Switzerland)	Tony Rominger	(Switzerland)	Tony Rominger	(Spain)	Jesús Montoya		
47	1992	(Switzerland)	Tony Rominger	(Uzbekistan)	Djamolidine Abdoujaparov	(Spain)	Carlos Hernández	(Switzerland)	Tony Rominger		
46	1991	(Spain)	Melcior Mauri	(Germany)	Uwe Raab	(Colombia)	Lucho Herrera	(Spain)	Federico Echave		
45	1990	(Italy)	Marco Giovannetti	(East Germany)	Uwe Raab	(Colombia)	José Martín Farfán	(Spain)	Federico Echave		
44	1989	(Spain)	Pedro Delgado	(United Kingdom)	Malcolm Elliott	(Colombia)	Óscar Vargas	(Colombia)	Óscar Vargas		
43	1988	(Republic of Ireland)	Sean Kelly	(Republic of Ireland)	Sean Kelly	(Spain)	Álvaro Pino	(Republic of Ireland)	Sean Kelly		
42	1987	(Colombia)	Lucho Herrera	(Spain)	Alfonso Gutiérrez	(Colombia)	Lucho Herrera	(France)	Laurent Fignon		
41	1986	(Spain)	Álvaro Pino	(Republic of Ireland)	Sean Kelly	(Spain)	José Luis Laguía	(Republic of Ireland)	Sean Kelly		
40	1985	(Spain)	Pedro Delgado	(Republic of Ireland)	Sean Kelly	(Spain)	José Luis Laguía	(United Kingdom)	Robert Millar		
39	1984	(France)	Éric Caritoux	(Belgium)	Guido Van Calster	(Spain)	Felipe Yáñez				
38	1983	(France)	Bernard Hinault	(Spain)	Marino Lejarreta	(Spain)	José Luis Laguía				
37	1982	(Spain)	Marino Lejarreta	(Switzerland)	Stefan Mutter	(Spain)	José Luis Laguía				
36	1981	(Italy)	Giovanni Battaglin	(Spain)	Francisco Javier Cedena	(Spain)	José Luis Laguía				
35	1980	(Spain)	Faustino Rupérez	(Republic of Ireland)	Sean Kelly	(Spain)	Juan Fernández				
34	1979	(Netherlands)	Joop Zoetemelk	(Belgium)	Fons De Wolf	(Spain)	Felipe Yáñez				
33	1978	(France)	Bernard Hinault	(Belgium)	Ferdi Van den Haute	(Spain)	Andrés Oliva				
32	1977	(Belgium)	Freddy Maertens	(Belgium)	Freddy Maertens	(Spain)	Pedro Torres				
31	1976	(Spain)	José Pesarrodona	(Germany)	Dietrich Thurau	(Spain)	Andrés Oliva				
30	1975	(Spain)	Agustín Tamames	(Spain)	Miguel María Lasa	(Spain)	Andrés Oliva				
29	1974	(Spain)	José Manuel Fuente	(Spain)	Domingo Perurena	(Spain)	José Luis Abilleira	(Spain)	José Luis Abilleira		
28	1973	(Belgium)	Eddy Merckx	(Belgium)	Eddy Merckx	(Spain)	José Luis Abilleira	(Belgium)	Eddy Merckx		
27	1972	(Spain)	José Manuel Fuente	(Spain)	Domingo Perurena	(Spain)	José Manuel Fuente	(Spain)	José Manuel Fuente		
26	1971	(Belgium)	Ferdinand Bracke	(France)	Cyrille Guimard	(Netherlands)	Joop Zoetemelk	(France)	Cyrille Guimard		
25	1970	(Spain)	Luis Ocaña	(Belgium)	Guido Reybrouck	(Spain)	Agustín Tamames	(Belgium)	Guido Reybrouck		
24	1969	(France)	Roger Pingeon	(Belgium)	Raymond Steegmans	(Spain)	Luis Ocaña				
23	1968	(Italy)	Felice Gimondi	(Netherlands)	Jan Janssen	(Spain)	Francisco Gabica				
22	1967	(Netherlands)	Jan Janssen	(Netherlands)	Jan Janssen	(Spain)	Mariano Díaz				
21	1966	(Spain)	Francisco Gabica	(Netherlands)	Jos van der Vleuten	(Spain)	Gregorio San Miguel				
20	1965	(Germany)	Rolf Wolfshohl	(Belgium)	Rik Van Looy	(Spain)	Julio Jiménez				
19	1964	(France)	Raymond Poulidor	(Spain)	José Pérez-Francés	(Spain)	Julio Jiménez				
18	1963	(France)	Jacques Anquetil	(Netherlands)	Bas Maliepaard	(Spain)	Julio Jiménez				
17	1962	(Germany)	Rudi Altig	(Germany)	Rudi Altig	(Spain)	Antonio Karmany				
16	1961	(Spain)	Angelino Soler	(Spain)	Antonio Suárez	(Spain)	Antonio Karmany				
15	1960	(Belgium)	Franz De Mulder	(Belgium)	Arthur De Cabooter	(Spain)	Antonio Karmany				
14	1959	(Spain)	Antonio Suárez	(Belgium)	Rik Van Looy	(Spain)	Antonio Suárez				
13	1958	(France)	Jean Stablinski	(Spain)	Salvador Botella	(Spain)	Federico Bahamontes				
12	1957	(Spain)	Jesús Loroño	(Spain)	Vicente Iturat	(Spain)	Federico Bahamontes				
11	1956	(Italy)	Angelo Conterno	(Belgium)	Rik Van Steenbergen	(Italy)	Nino Defilippis				
10	1955	(France)	Jean Dotto	(Italy)	Fiorenzo Magni	(Italy)	Giuseppe Buratti				
9	1950	(Spain)	Emilio Rodríguez			(Spain)	Emilio Rodríguez				
8	1948	(Spain)	Bernardo Ruiz			(Spain)	Bernardo Ruiz				
7	1947	(Belgium)	Edward Van Dijck	(Spain)	Delio Rodríguez	(Spain)	Emilio Rodríguez				
6	1946	(Spain)	Dalmacio Langarica			(Spain)	Emilio Rodríguez				
5	1945	(Spain)	Delio Rodríguez	(Spain)	Delio Rodríguez	(Spain)	Julián Berrendero				
4	1942	(Spain)	Julián Berrendero			(Spain)	Julián Berrendero				
3	1941	(Spain)	Julián Berrendero			(Spain)	Fermín Trueba				
2	1936	(Belgium)	Gustaaf Deloor			(Spain)	Salvador Molina				
1	1935	(Belgium)	Gustaaf Deloor			(Italy)	Edoardo Molinar				

== By rider ==
Cyclist	Total	Years
Roberto Heras (ESP)	4	2000, 2003, 2004, 2005
Primož Roglič (SLO)	4	2019, 2020, 2021, 2024
Tony Rominger (SUI)	3	1992, 1993, 1994
Alberto Contador (ESP)	3	2008, 2012, 2014
Gustaaf Deloor (BEL)	2	1935, 1936
Julián Berrendero (ESP)	2	1941, 1942
José Manuel Fuente (ESP)	2	1972, 1974
Bernard Hinault (FRA)	2	1978, 1983
Pedro Delgado (ESP)	2	1985, 1989
Alex Zülle (SUI)	2	1996, 1997
Chris Froome (GBR)	2	2011, 2017

== By country ==
=== Overall ===
Rank	Country	Wins
1	Spain	32
2	France	9
3	Belgium	8
4	Italy	6
5	Switzerland	5
6	Slovenia	4
7	Germany	3
7	United Kingdom	3
9	Colombia	2
9	Netherlands	2
9	Russia	2
9	United States	2
13	Ireland	1
13	Kazakhstan	1
13	(Denmark) Denmark	1

=== Points ===
Rank	Country	Wins
1	Spain	16
2	Belgium	15
3	Germany	8
4	Netherlands	6
5	France	5
5	Italy	5
7	Ireland	4
8	United Kingdom	3
9	Switzerland	2
9	Slovenia	2
9	Australia	2
12	Denmark	1
12	East Germany	1
12	Norway	1
12	Uzbekistan	1

=== King of the Mountains ===
Rank	Country	Wins
1	Spain	50
2	France	9
3	Colombia	7
4	Italy	3
4	Australia	3
6	Switzerland	2
7	Ecuador	1
7	Netherlands	1
7	Russia	1
7	Belgium	1

== See also ==
- List of Tour de France winners
- List of Giro d'Italia general classification winners
- Golden jersey statistics
