= Mountains classification in the Vuelta a España =

Secondary classification in the Spanish cycling grand tour

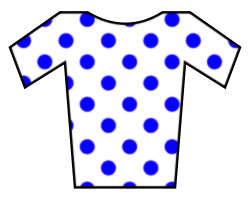
- Sport: Road Cycling
- Competition: Vuelta a España
- Awarded for: Winner of the mountains classification

History
- First award: 1935
- Editions: 81 (as of 2026)
- First winner: Edoardo Molinar (ITA)
- Most wins: José Luis Laguía (ESP) (5 wins)
- Most recent: Santiago Buitrago (COL)

The mountains classification in the Vuelta a España is a secondary classification in the Vuelta a España. For this classification, points are given to the cyclists who cross the mountain peaks first. The classification was established in 1935, when it was won by Italian Edoardo Molinar, and until 2005 the leader in the mountain classification wore a green jersey. In 2006, it became an orange jersey, and in 2010 it became white with blue dots.

Spaniard José Luis Laguía has won this classification a record five times, including three consecutive. Other cyclists who have won this ranking for three consecutive times were Antonio Karmany, Julio Jiménez, José María Jiménez, all Spaniards. Overall, the Spaniards have dominated this classification by 47 out of 68 times.

In 2010, David Moncoutié considered retirement, but remained a professional cyclist to try to win his third consecutive mountains classification. In 2011, he became the first rider ever to win this award in four consecutive years.

== Jersey ==
As of 2010, the leader of the mountains classification is awarded a white jersey with blue dots. The mountains jersey is third in the rankings of jerseys, behind the jersey for the general classification and points classification in the Vuelta a España but before the combination classification; this means that if a cyclists leads both the general classification and the mountains classification, he wears the jersey for the general classification, and the mountains jersey is passed on to the second cyclist in that ranking.

== Rules ==
The organisation of the Vuelta designates which climbs are given points, and in which category they fall. As of 2022, there are 6 categories: most points are scored on the Top Alberto Fernández, the highest point of the Vuelta.

Class	1	2	3	4	5	6
Top Alberto Fernández	20	15	10	6	4	2
High climb finish (Categoria Especial)	15	10	6	4	2	1
First category	10	6	4	2	1	
Second category	5	3	1			
Third category	3	2	1			
Fourth category	2	1				

If two or more cyclists have the same number of points, the cyclist who was first on the 'Top Alberto Fernandez' gets the higher ranking. If that does not solve the problem, the cyclists with the most high climb finishes wins gets the higher ranking. If that does not solve it, the cyclists with the most first category wins, and so on. If after the third category there is still a tie, the order in the general classification is used.

== List of winners ==
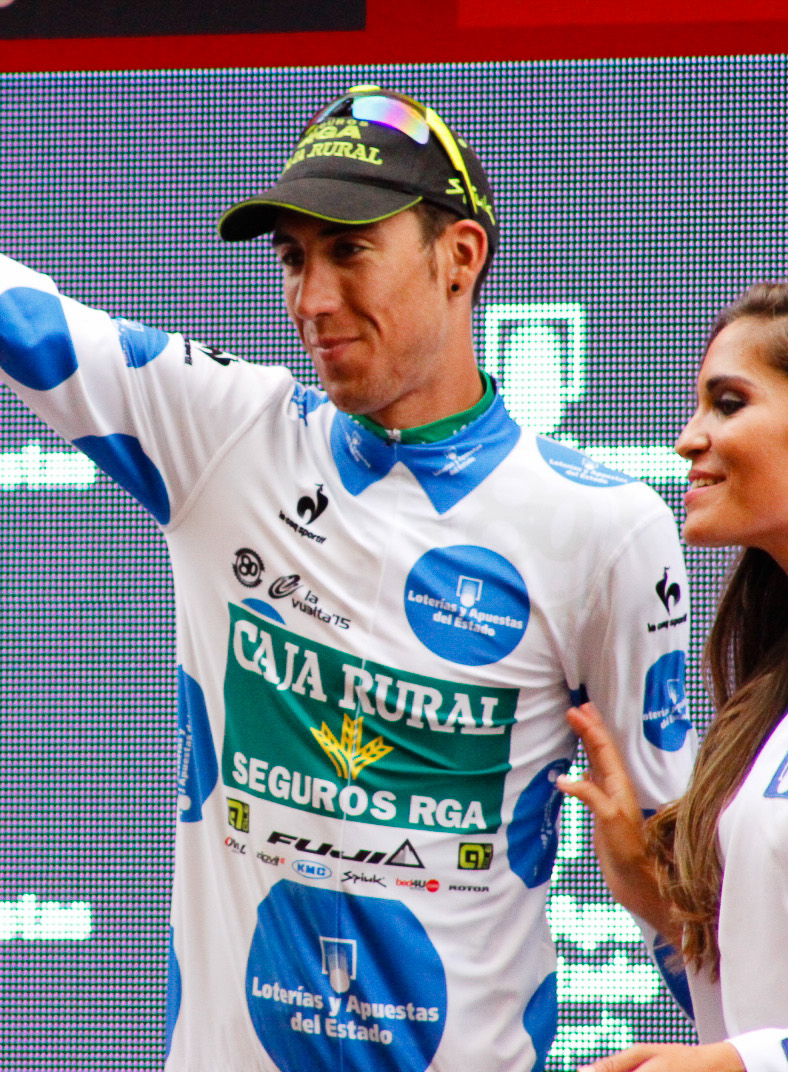
Omar Fraile, winner of the mountains classification at the 2015 Vuelta a España

Winners of the mountain classification
Year	First	Second	Third
1935	Edoardo Molinar (ITA)	Luigi Barral (ITA)	Leo Amberg (SUI)
1936	Salvador Molina (ESP)	Julián Berrendero (ESP)	(Spain) Fermín Trueba
1937–1940: no race
1941	Fermin Trueba (ESP)	Julián Berrendero (ESP)	José Jabardo (ESP)
1942	Julián Berrendero (ESP)	Pierre Brambilla (ITA)	Isidro Berajano (ESP)
1943–1944: no race
1945	Julián Berrendero (ESP)	Joao Rebelo (POR)	Pedro Font (ESP)
1946	Emilio Rodríguez (ESP)	Dalmacio Langarica (ESP)	Julián Berrendero (ESP)
1947	Emilio Rodríguez (ESP)	Martin Mancisidor (ESP)	Manuel Costa (ESP)
1948	Bernardo Ruiz (ESP)	Emilio Rodríguez (ESP)	Bernardo Capo (ESP)
1949: no race
1950	Emilio Rodríguez (ESP)	José Serra (ESP)	Jesús Loroño (ESP)
1951–1954: no race
1955	Giuseppe Buratti (ITA)	Antonio Gelabert (ESP)	Gilbert Bauvin (FRA)
1956	Nino Defilippis (ITA)	Federico Bahamontes (ESP)	(Spain) Antonio Suárez
1957	Federico Bahamontes (ESP)	Carmelo Morales (ESP)	Benigno Aspuru (ESP)
1958	Federico Bahamontes (ESP)	Jesús Loroño (ESP)	Hilaire Couvreur (BEL)
1959	Antonio Suárez (ESP)	Richard Van Genechten (BEL)	Antonio Karmany (ESP)
1960	Antonio Karmany (ESP)	Antonio Suárez (ESP)	Frans De Mulder (BEL)
1961	Antonio Karmany (ESP)	Julio Jiménez (ESP)	José Perez-FRs (ESP)
1962	Antonio Karmany (ESP)	José Segú (ESP)	Julio Jiménez (ESP)
1963	Julio Jiménez (ESP)	Antonio Karmany (ESP)	Guy Ignolin (FRA)
1964	Julio Jiménez (ESP)	José Perez-FRs (ESP)	Ventura Díaz (ESP)
1965	Julio Jiménez (ESP)	Antonio Gómez del Moral (ESP)	Esteban Martín (ESP)
1966	Gregorio San Miguel (ESP)	Domingo Perurena (ESP)	Mariano Díaz (ESP)
1967	Mariano Díaz (ESP)	Gregorio San Miguel (ESP)	Vicente López Carril (ESP)
1968	Francisco Gabica (ESP)	Antonio Gómez del Moral (ESP)	José Perez-FRs (ESP)
1969	Luis Ocaña (ESP)	Roger Pingeon (FRA)	Gilbert Bellone (FRA)
1970	Agustín Tamames (ESP)	Ventura Díaz (ESP)	Joaquim Galera (ESP)
1971	Joop Zoetemelk (NED)	Luis Balagué (ESP)	Wilfried David (BEL)
1972	José Manuel Fuente (ESP)	Andrés Oliva (ESP)	Miguel María Lasa (ESP)
1973	José Luis Abilleira (ESP)	Eddy Merckx (BEL)	Luis Balagué (ESP)
1974	José Luis Abilleira (ESP)	José Manuel Fuente (ESP)	Luis Ocaña (ESP)
1975	Andrés Oliva (ESP)	Pedro Torres (ESP)	Luis Ocaña (ESP)
1976	Andrés Oliva (ESP)	Ludo Loos (BEL)	Joaquim Agostinho (POR)
1977	Pedro Torres (ESP)	Andrés Oliva (ESP)	Ludo Loos (BEL)
1978	Andrés Oliva (ESP)	Enrique Cima (ESP)	Bernard Hinault (FRA)
1979	Felipe Yáñez (ESP)	Vicente Belda (ESP)	Joop Zoetemelk (NED)
1980	Juan Fernández (ESP)	Anastasio Greciano (ESP)	José Luis Laguía (ESP)
1981	José Luis Laguía (ESP)	Vicente Belda (ESP)	José Luis Cerron (ESP)
1982	José Luis Laguía (ESP)	Juan Fernández (ESP)	José Recio (ESP)
1983	José Luis Laguía (ESP)	Fiorenzo Aliverti (ITA)	Marino Lejarreta (ESP)
1984	Felipe Yáñez (ESP)	José Luis Laguía (ESP)	Éric Caritoux (FRA)
1985	José Luis Laguía (ESP)	Robert Millar (GBR)	Francisco Rodríguez (COL)
1986	José Luis Laguía (ESP)	Álvaro Pino (ESP)	Eduardo Chozas (ESP)
1987	Luis Herrera (COL)	Vicente Belda (ESP)	Henri Abadie (FRA)
1988	Álvaro Pino (ESP)	Anselmo Fuerte (ESP)	Seán Kelly (IRL)
1989	Óscar Vargas (COL)	Pedro Delgado (ESP)	Ivan Ivanov (URS)
1990	José Martín Farfán (COL)	Álvaro Mejía (COL)	Pablo Wilches (COL)
1991	Luis Herrera (COL)	Marino Lejarreta (ESP)	Fabio Parra (COL)
1992	Carlos Hernández (ESP)	Tony Rominger (SUI)	Julio Cesar Cadena (COL)
1993	Tony Rominger (SUI)	Alex Zülle (SUI)	Antonio Miguel Diaz (ESP)
1994	Luc Leblanc (FRA)	Michele Coppolillo (ITA)	Tony Rominger (SUI)
1995	Laurent Jalabert (FRA)	Roberto Pistore (ITA)	Alex Zülle (SUI)
1996	Tony Rominger (SUI)	Laurent Jalabert (FRA)	Dmitri Konysjev (RUS)
1997	José María Jiménez (ESP)	Alex Zülle (SUI)	Laurent Jalabert (FRA)
1998	José María Jiménez (ESP)	Laurent Jalabert (FRA)	Fernando Escartín (ESP)
1999	José María Jiménez (ESP)	Frank Vandenbroucke (BEL)	Roberto Heras (ESP)
2000	Carlos Sastre (ESP)	Roberto Heras (ESP)	Roberto Laiseka (ESP)
2001	José María Jiménez (ESP)	Claus Michael Møller (DEN)	Juan Miguel Mercado (ESP)
2002	Aitor Osa (ESP)	Roberto Heras (ESP)	Juan Antonio Flecha (ESP)
2003	Félix Cárdenas (COL)	Aitor Osa (ESP)	Joan Horrach (ESP)
2004	Félix Cárdenas (COL)	Roberto Heras (ESP)	Santiago Pérez (ESP)
2005	Joaquim Rodríguez (ESP)	Eladio Jiménez (ESP)	Roberto Heras (ESP)
2006	Egoi Martínez (ESP)	Pietro Caucchioli (ITA)	Alejandro Valverde (ESP)
2007	Denis Menchov (RUS)	Jurgen Van Goolen (BEL)	Carlos Sastre (ESP)
2008	David Moncoutié (FRA)	Christophe Kern (FRA)	Alberto Contador (ESP)
2009	David Moncoutié (FRA)	David de la Fuente (ESP)	Julián Sánchez (ESP)
2010	David Moncoutié (FRA)	Serafín Martínez (ESP)	Ezequiel Mosquera (ESP)
2011	David Moncoutié (FRA)	Matteo Montaguti (ITA)	~~Juan José Cobo (ESP)~~; Dan Martin (IRL)
2012	Simon Clarke (AUS)	David de la Fuente (ESP)	Joaquim Rodríguez (ESP)
2013	Nicolas Edet (FRA)	Chris Horner (USA)	Daniele Ratto (ITA)
2014	Luis León Sánchez (ESP)	Alberto Contador (ESP)	Alejandro Valverde (ESP)
2015	Omar Fraile (ESP)	Rubén Plaza (ESP)	Fränk Schleck (LUX)
2016	Omar Fraile (ESP)	Kenny Elissonde (FRA)	Robert Gesink (NED)
2017	Davide Villella (ITA)	Miguel Ángel López (COL)	Chris Froome (GBR)
2018	Thomas De Gendt (BEL)	Bauke Mollema (NED)	Luis Ángel Maté (ESP)
2019	Geoffrey Bouchard (FRA)	Ángel Madrazo (ESP)	Sergio Samitier (ESP)
2020	Guillaume Martin (FRA)	Tim Wellens (BEL)	Richard Carapaz (ECU)
2021	Michael Storer (AUS)	Romain Bardet (FRA)	Primož Roglič (SLO)
2022	Richard Carapaz (ECU)	Robert Stannard (AUS)	Enric Mas (ESP)
2023	Remco Evenepoel (BEL)	Jonas Vingegaard (DEN)	Michael Storer (AUS)
2024	Jay Vine (AUS)	Marc Soler (ESP)	Pablo Castrillo (ESP)
2025	Jay Vine (AUS)	Jonas Vingegaard (DEN)	João Almeida (POR)
2026	Santiago Buitrago (COL)	Wout van Aert (BEL)	Andreas Leknessund (NOR)

=== Multiple winners ===
Wins	Rider	Editions
5	José Luis Laguía (ESP)	1981, 1982, 1983, 1985, 1986
4	José María Jiménez (ESP)	1997, 1998, 1999, 2001
4	David Moncoutié (FRA)	2008, 2009, 2010, 2011
3	Emilio Rodríguez (ESP)	1946, 1947, 1950
3	Antonio Karmany (ESP)	1960, 1961, 1962
3	Julio Jiménez (ESP)	1963, 1964, 1965
3	Andrés Oliva (ESP)	1975, 1976, 1978
2	Julián Berrendero (ESP)	1942, 1945
2	Federico Bahamontes (ESP)	1957, 1958
2	José Luis Abilleira (ESP)	1973, 1974
2	Felipe Yáñez (ESP)	1979, 1984
2	Luis Herrera (COL)	1987, 1991
2	Tony Rominger (SUI)	1993, 1996
2	Félix Cárdenas (COL)	2003, 2004
2	Omar Fraile (ESP)	2015, 2016
2	Jay Vine (AUS)	2024, 2025

== Days in leader's jersey ==
after the end of 2026 Vuelta a España

Rider	Days	Stages
(Spain) José Luis Laguía	90	94
(Spain) José Luis Abilleira	66	75
(France) David Moncoutié	47	47
(Spain) Julián Berrendero	46	49
(Spain) José María Jiménez	42	42
(Switzerland) Tony Rominger	35	36
(Spain) Felipe Yáñez	33	37
(Spain) Emilio Rodríguez	30	33
(Spain) Julio Jiménez	30	31
(Australia) Jay Vine	30	30
(Colombia) Luis Herrera	26	26
(Spain) Federico Bahamontes	25	26
(Spain) Gregorio San Miguel	23	26
(Spain) Andrés Oliva	23	26
(Colombia) José Martín Farfán	23	23
(Colombia) Félix Cárdenas	23	23
(France) Laurent Jalabert	22	22
(Spain) Omar Fraile	22	22
(Spain) Antonio Karmany	21	22
(Spain) Francisco Cerezo	21	21
