= Sprinter (cycling) =

Type of road racing cyclist

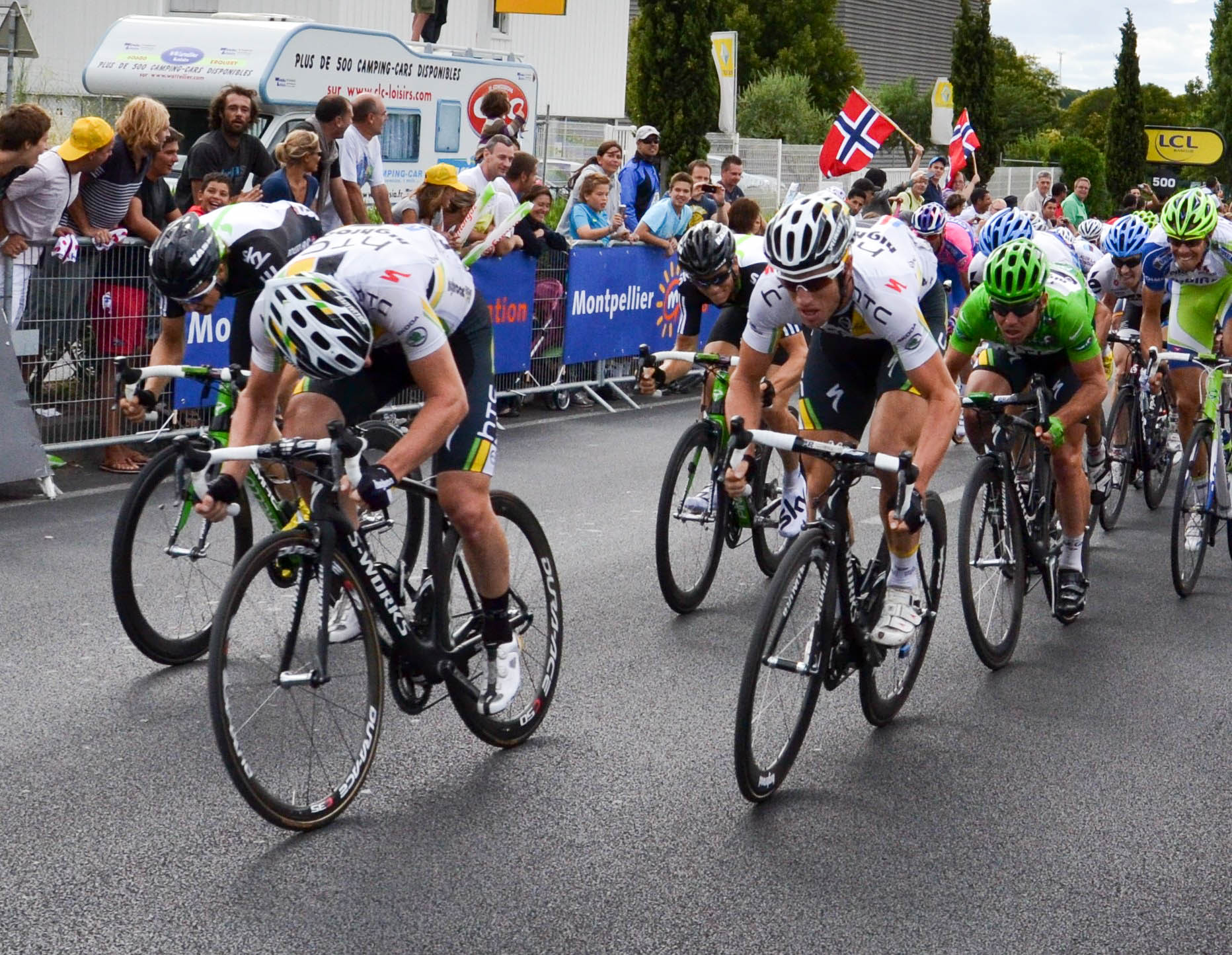
A bunch sprint finish at the 2011 Tour de France, in which sprinter Mark Cavendish (in the green jersey) is being led out by the last of his team's sprint train, Mark Renshaw.

A sprinter is a road bicycle racer or track racer who can finish a race very explosively by accelerating quickly to a high speed, often using the slipstream of another cyclist or group of cyclists tactically to conserve energy.

Apart from using sprinting as a racing tactic, sprinters can also compete for intermediate sprints (sometimes called primes), often to provide additional excitement in cities along the route of a race. In stage races, intermediate sprints and final stage placings may be combined in a points classification. For example, in the points classification in the Tour de France, the maillot vert (green jersey) is won by the race's most consistent sprinter. At the Tour de France, the most successful recipient of this honor is Slovak sprinter Peter Sagan, who has won seven Tour de France green jerseys (2012–2016, 2018–2019).

== The road sprinter ==
Sprinters have a higher ratio of fast-twitch muscle fibers than non-sprinters. Road cycling sprinters sometimes tend to have a larger build than the average road racing cyclist, combining the strength of their legs with their upper body to produce a short burst of speed necessary in a closely contested finish. Some sprinters have a high top speed but may take a longer distance to achieve it, while others can produce short and sharp accelerations. Aerodynamics plays a key role in sprints.

A sprinter is usually heavier, limiting their speed advantage to relatively flat sections. It is therefore not uncommon for sprinters to be dropped by the peloton (also known as the 'bunch' or 'pack') if a race is through hilly terrain.

Sprinters may have different preferences. Some prefer a longer "launch" while others prefer to 'draft' or slipstream behind their teammates or opponents before accelerating in the final meters. Some prefer slight uphill finishes, while others prefer downhill finishes.

== Sprinter tactics ==
In conventional road races, sprinters may bide their time waiting until the last few hundred metres before putting on a burst of speed to win the race. Many races will finish with a large group sprinting for the win; some sprinters may have team-mates, so-called domestiques 'leading them out' (i.e., keeping pace high and sheltering the sprinter) so that they have a greater chance of finishing in the leading positions. These teammates tend to "peel off" one by one as they tire; the last teammate is known as the "lead-out sprinter" and the best of them are excellent sprinters in their own right.

Several of the Classic one day races, for example Milan–San Remo or Paris–Tours, tend to favour sprinters because of their long distance and relatively flat terrain. A long day of racing does not benefit a sprinter per se, but very long stages or one day races tend to preclude successful breakaways and otherwise aggressive racing, ensuring the race will come down to a bunch sprint. Most editions of these races end in a bunch sprint, often won by racers also successful in the points classification at stage races. Stronger sprinters with abilities in hilly terrain or on cobblestones also have good prospects of winning the Ardennes classics or the Cobbled classics respectively.

== Famous sprinters ==
The first great pure sprinter in the Tour de France was Frenchman Charles Pélissier who won eight stages in the 1930 Tour de France, still a record (shared with Eddy Merckx and Freddy Maertens). A year later, Pélissier battled with Italian sprinter Raffaele di Paco in one of the first major sprinter clashes. Both won five stages. In the 1941 Vuelta a España, Delio Rodríguez won 12 stages, followed by 8 the next year. He even managed to win the Overall Classification a few years later.

Another successful sprinter of the interbellum was French allrounder André Leducq. Although he could do more than sprint alone, including winning stage races (winning the Tour de France twice) and classics, 15 of his total 25 stage victories in the Tour were in bunch sprints.

André Darrigade is considered as the greatest French sprinter of all time. He won 22 stages in the Tour de France and twice the Points classification. He also built his legend by winning titles ahead of major cyclists, as the 1955 French National Championship ahead of Louison Bobet and the 1956 Giro di Lombardia ahead of Fausto Coppi. He finished on the podium of the World Championship 4 times in a row and won the title in 1959.

Freddy Maertens only participated in six grand tours but took home the Points Jersey on four occasions, winning 12 of his 15 Tour de France stage wins in a bunch sprint. His only participation in Vuelta a España in 1977 resulted not only in a record 13 stage wins, but also in the win of the general classification. Just five days after finishing the Vuelta, he went on race the Giro d'Italia, where he won 7 stages before having to abandon the race after a crash halfway through the race.

As the sport of cycling progressed into one of more specialized riders in the 1980s, bunch sprints became the arena of specialists – pure sprinters like Guido Bontempi, Jean-Paul van Poppel and Mario Cipollini, all focusing primarily on sprint stages, with other riders (classics specialists, time trialists, climbers etc.) aiming for victories in other types of stages. Cipollini holds the record for most stage wins in the Grand Tours as a sprinter; 57, of which 42 were in the Giro d'Italia. Fellow Italian sprinter Alessandro Petacchi (48 stage wins) won stages and the Points Classification in all three grand tours, including 20 stage wins in the Vuelta. The record for stage wins in the Vuelta belongs to Delio Rodríguez, with 39 wins. Mark Cavendish was named the Tour de France's best sprinter of all time by French paper L'Équipe on July 15, 2012. His tally currently stands on 52 individual stage wins in Grand Tours, 35 of which have been bunch sprints in the Tour de France.

Erik Zabel won a record nine points classifications: six in the Tour de France and three in the Vuelta a España. Of the five riders to win the Points classification in all three Grand Tours, three were pure sprinters: Djamolidine Abdoujaparov, Alessandro Petacchi and Mark Cavendish. The other two were all-rounders Eddy Merckx and Laurent Jalabert.

Peter Sagan won a record seven Points classification in the Tour de France. He won three consecutive World Championship, one European Championship, two Monument races Paris–Roubaix and Tour of Flanders.

The only three riders in cycling's history to win stages at all three grand tours in the same calendar year were all sprinters: Miguel Poblet in 1956, Pierino Baffi in 1958 and Alessandro Petacchi in 2003.

A good sprint can also secure several victories for other specialists, such as Classics riders and GC-contenders. Seán Kelly won 21 stages in the Tour and Vuelta, and the Points Classifications of both races four times each, in addition to his nine major Classics wins. Likewise, Belgian classics specialists Rik Van Steenbergen, Rik Van Looy and Roger De Vlaeminck were very successful due to a good final sprint, as were Italian Giro d'Italia-winners Bepe Saronni and Francesco Moser and their compatriot and two-time World Champion, Paolo Bettini.

Conversely, many sprinters use their abilities to win more than just stages, and were successful in classics such as the Tour of Flanders (like Rudi Altig and Jan Raas), Paris–Roubaix (Eddy Planckaert) and the Giro di Lombardia (like André Darrigade) or even stage races (in addition to the aforementioned Leducq, Rodríguez, Maertens, Saronni and Moser, they include Rudi Altig, Sean Kelly and Laurent Jalabert who all won the Vuelta, as did 1968 Tour de France winner and all-rounder Jan Janssen.

The ultimate sprinter classic due to its relatively flat course is Milan–San Remo, won four times by Zabel and three times by three-time World Champion Óscar Freire. Other "flat" one day races considered important sprinter classics include Gent–Wevelgem, Scheldeprijs, Vattenfall Cyclassics, Paris-Brussels and Paris–Tours.

=== List of successful sprinters ===
Men

- (Uzbekistan) Djamolidine Abdoujaparov
- (West Germany) Rudi Altig
- (Italy) Pierino Baffi
- (Italy) Marino Basso
- (Republic of Ireland) Sam Bennett
- (Netherlands) Jeroen Blijlevens
- (Italy) Guido Bontempi
- (Belgium) Tom Boonen
- (United Kingdom) Mark Cavendish
- (Italy) Mario Cipollini
- (France) André Darrigade
- (France) Arnaud Démare
- (Italy) Raffaele di Paco
- (Australia) Caleb Ewan
- (Spain) Óscar Freire
- (Switzerland) Urs Freuler
- (Colombia) Fernando Gaviria
- (Eritrea) Biniam Girmay
- (Germany) André Greipel
- (France) René Le Grevès
- (Netherlands) Dylan Groenewegen
- (Norway) Thor Hushovd
- (Netherlands) Fabio Jakobsen
- (Netherlands) Gerben Karstens
- (Republic of Ireland) Sean Kelly
- (Germany) Marcel Kittel
- (Norway) Alexander Kristoff
- (Belgium) Rik van Linden
- (East Germany) Olaf Ludwig
- (Belgium) Freddy Maertens
- (Australia) Robbie McEwen
- (Belgium) Tim Merlier
- (Italy) Jonathan Milan
- (Denmark) Mads Pedersen
- (France) Charles Pélissier
- (Italy) Alessandro Petacchi
- (Belgium) Jasper Philipsen
- (Spain) Miguel Poblet
- (Belgium) Guido Reybrouck
- (Slovakia) Peter Sagan
- (Belgium) Patrick Sercu
- (Belgium) Tom Steels
- (Belgium) Wout van Aert
- (Belgium) Rik van Looy
- (Netherlands) Jean-Paul van Poppel
- (Belgium) Rik van Steenbergen
- (Belgium) Eric Vanderaerden
- (Italy) Elia Viviani
- (Germany) Marcel Wüst
- (Germany) Erik Zabel
- (Italy) Dino Zandegù

Women

- (Australia) Anna Meares
- (United Kingdom) Victoria Pendleton
- (Germany) Kristina Vogel
- (Italy) Giorgia Bronzini
- (Netherlands) Lorena Wiebes

== The track sprinter ==
Sprinting on a cycle track or velodrome ranges from the highly specialised sprint event (where two or more riders slowly circle the track looking to gain a tactical advantage before launching a finishing burst over the final 200 metres, which is timed), to massed-start events decided by the first across the line after a certain number of laps (similar to road racing). The sprint specialist may also ride short track time trials over 1000 metres, the team sprint and Keirin events.

In Madison racing, a team may comprise a specialist sprinter, for when sudden bursts of speed are required, and another rider able to ride at a more consistent high tempo.

== See also ==
- Sprint (cycling)
