= List of Vuelta a España general classification winners =

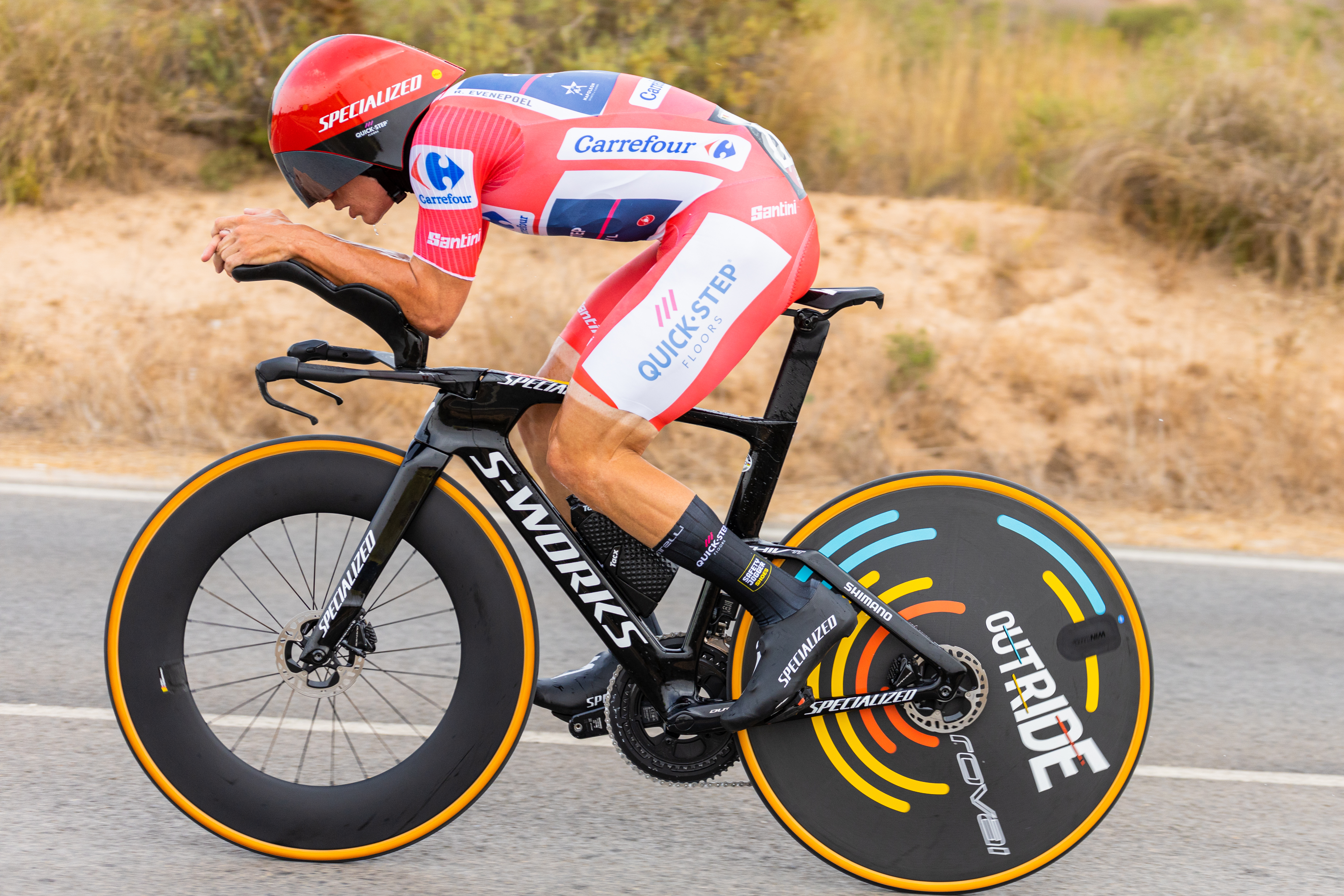
Remco Evenepoel wearing the Red Jersey at the 2022 Vuelta a España

The Vuelta a España is an annual road bicycle race. Established in 1935 by the Spanish newspaper Informaciones, the Vuelta is one of cycling's three "Grand Tours", along with the Tour de France and the Giro d'Italia. Initially, the race was held in April/May, but in 1995 it was moved to September. The race usually covers approximately 3,500 kilometres (2,200 mi), although this has varied, passing through Spain and countries with a close proximity in Europe. The race is broken into day-long segments called stages. Individual finishing times for each stage are totalled to determine the overall winner at the end of the race. The course changes every year, but has traditionally finished in Madrid.

Individual times to finish each stage are totalled to determine the winner of the general classification at the end of the race. The rider with the lowest aggregate time at the end of each day wears the leader's jersey. Since 2010 this has been a red jersey; previously it was gold. Other classifications have been calculated: those still in use are the points classification, in 2010 represented by a green jersey; the mountains classification, in 2010 represented by a blue dotted jersey; and the young rider classification, in 2019 represented by a white jersey.

Roberto Heras and Primož Roglič hold the record for most victories with four. Heras's win in 2005 was subject to a successful appeal in court, which overturned his initial disqualification for EPO in the 2005 race. Alberto Contador and Tony Rominger have won three times. Angelino Soler is the youngest winner of the Vuelta at 21 years and 168 days old when he won in 1961. Chris Horner is the oldest winner of the Vuelta, winning the 2013 edition at the age of 41 years and 328 days old. Spanish cyclists have won the most Vueltas; 23 cyclists have won 32 Vueltas between them. French cyclists are second with nine victories and Belgian riders are third with eight wins. The current champion is Enric Mas of Movistar Team, who won the 2026 Vuelta a España.

== History ==
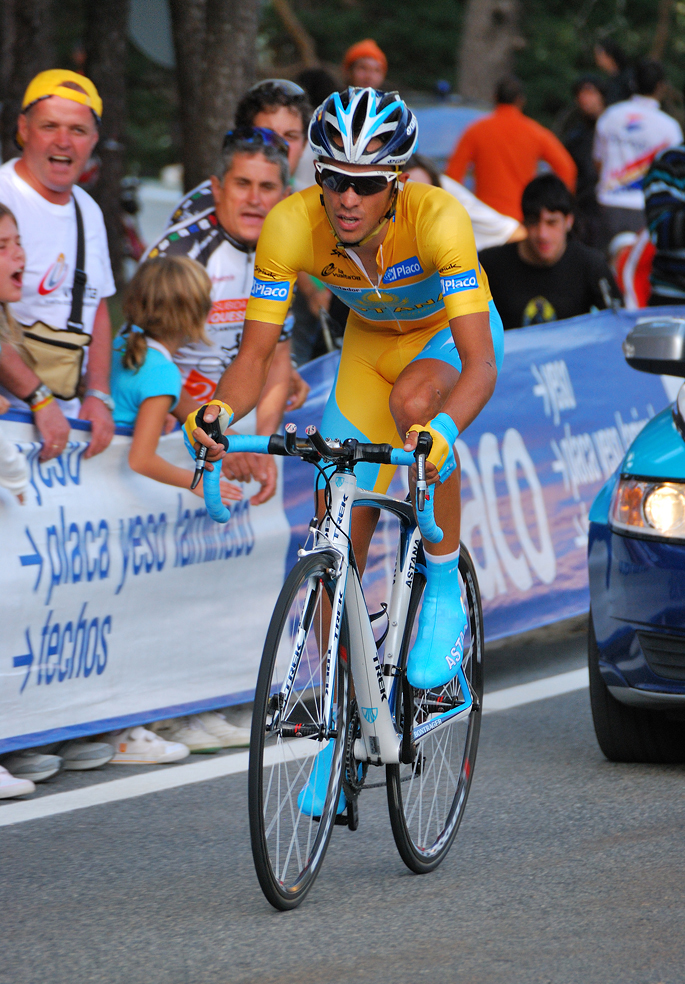
Alberto Contador in the gold jersey, which was replaced by a red jersey for 2010, representing the leader in the general classification.

The Vuelta a España was established in 1935 by the newspaper Informaciones following on from the success of the Tour de France and Giro d'Italia which had also been established by newspapers. The first race was won by Gustaaf Deloor, who won again the following year. The Vuelta was suspended for four years from 1937 to 1940 due to the Spanish Civil War. The first race after the civil war in 1941 was won by Julián Berrendero, who also won the following year. The Vuelta was suspended between 1943 and 1944 due to the Second World War. Delio Rodríguez won the first Vuelta after the war, Spanish riders won two more Vueltas in 1946 and 1948. The Vuelta was not held in 1949. Emilio Rodríguez was the victor in 1950, before the Vuelta was suspended from 1951 to 1954 as Spain's isolation during this period led to dwindling international interest in the race.

Jean Dotto won the first Vuelta after the four-year suspension in 1955. Angelo Conterno was the victor the following year, by a margin of 13 seconds over Jesús Loroño. Loroño was victorious in 1957 with Conterno absent. Rudi Altig became the first German to win the Vuelta in 1962. Frenchman Jacques Anquetil won in 1963, in doing so he became the first cyclist to win all three Grand Tours. Belgian cyclist Eddy Merckx matched Anquetil's achievement in winning all three Grand Tours when he won the Vuelta in 1973. The following year José Manuel Fuente won the Vuelta by 11 seconds.

Bernard Hinault won the Vuelta in 1978, a year in which he also won the Tour de France. He won his second Vuelta in 1983. The following year Éric Caritoux won the Vuelta by the smallest margin ever, he won by six seconds over Alberto Fernández. Pedro Delgado won the Vuelta in 1985. Colombian Luis Herrera became the first non-European winner of the Vuelta in 1987. Sean Kelly was victorious in 1988, and the following year Delgado won his second Vuelta.

Swiss riders dominated the 1990s; Tony Rominger won a record three Vueltas in succession from 1992 to 1994. Laurent Jalabert was victorious in 1995, he also won the points and mountain classification becoming only the third person to win all these classifications in a single Grand Tour. Alex Zülle won two Vueltas in succession in 1996 and 1997. German Jan Ullrich was the victor in 1999. Roberto Heras won his first Vuelta in 2000; he won a further two in 2003 and 2004. In 2005 he appeared to have won a record fourth Vuelta, however he was later stripped of his title after failing a drug-control test. Second place Denis Menchov became the victor.

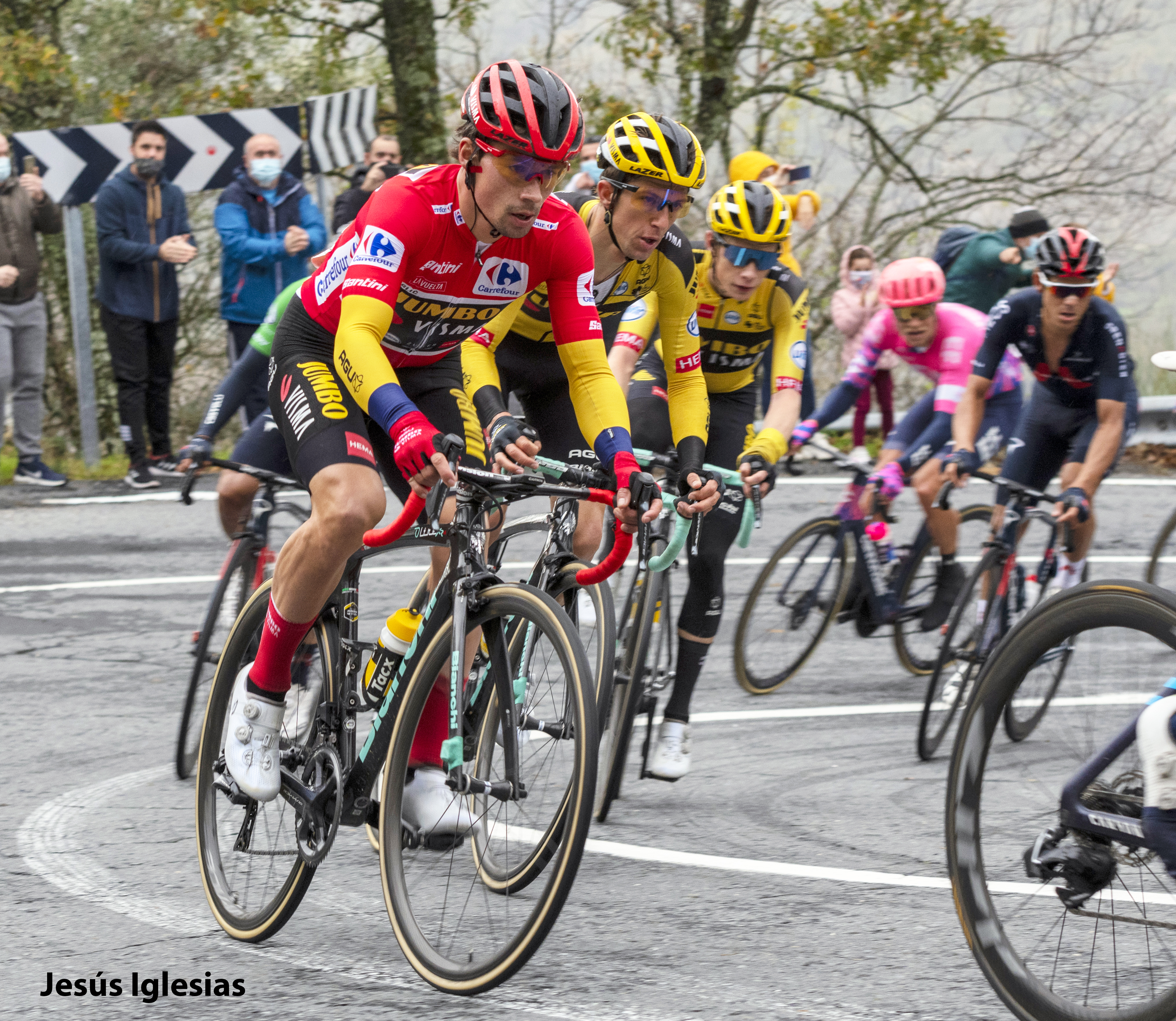
Primož Roglič wearing the red jersey during the 2020 Vuelta a España

Alexander Vinokourov won the 2006 Vuelta a España with the Astana team. Menchov won his second tour in 2007. Alberto Contador won the 2008 Vuelta; the victory meant he became the fifth cyclist to win all three Grand Tours. Alejandro Valverde was the victor in 2009. The following year, Valverde was unable to defend his title after being suspended for two years for his involvement in the Operación Puerto doping case. Vincenzo Nibali won the 2010 Vuelta. Juan José Cobo won the 2011 Vuelta a España by thirteen seconds. However, on 12 June 2019, the UCI announced that Cobo was found guilty of an anti-doping rule violation in relation to his biological passport and stripped of his title six days later. Runner-up Chris Froome was awarded the win to retrospectively become the first British cyclist to win a Grand Tour.

Contador won his second Vuelta in 2012. American Chris Horner, became the oldest Grand Tour winner at the age of 41, when he won the Vuelta in 2013. Contador won the race for the third time in 2014, as he beat Chris Froome by one minute and ten seconds. Fabio Aru beat Tom Dumoulin by 57 seconds in 2015 to win the Vuelta. Nairo Quintana won the 2016 Vuelta, one minute and twenty-three seconds ahead of Froome. Froome was successful the following year to become the first rider since Hinault in 1978 to win the Tour and Vuelta in the same year. Simon Yates won the 2018 Vuelta. It was the third victory by a British rider in a Grand Tour in 2018 and the first time three different riders from the same country had won all three races in one year. Primož Roglič won the 2019 Vuelta to become the first Slovenian rider to win a Grand Tour. Roglič won again the following year, beating runner-up Richard Carapaz by 24 seconds. Roglič became the first rider since Heras to win three consecutive Vueltas, when he won the 2021 edition. Remco Evenepoel won the 2022 Vuelta a España. Sepp Kuss won the 2023 Vuelta by 17 seconds from his teammate Jonas Vingegaard. Roglič won the Vuelta the following year to equal Heras's record for most victories with four. Jonas Vingegaard won the Vuelta the following year.

== Winners ==
Key
†	Winner won points classification in the same year
*	Winner won mountains classification in the same year
#	Winner won combination classification in the same year
‡	Winner won points and King of the Mountains classification in the same year
&	Winner won points and combination classification in same year

- The "Year" column refers to the year the competition was held, and wikilinks to the article about that season.
- The "Distance" column refers to the distance over which the race was held.
- The "Margin" column refers to the margin of time or points by which the winner defeated the runner-up.
- The "Stage wins" column refers to the number of stage wins the winner had during the race.

Vuelta a España general classification winners
Year	Country	Cyclist	Sponsor/team	Distance	Time	Margin	Stage wins
1935	Belgium	Gustaaf Deloor	—	3,245 km (2,016 mi)	120h 00' 07"	+ 13' 28"	3
1936	Belgium	Gustaaf Deloor	—	4,364 km (2,712 mi)	150h 07' 54"	+ 11' 39"	3
1937	—	Not contested due to the Spanish Civil War	—	—	—	—	—
1938	—	Not contested due to the Spanish Civil War	—	—	—	—	—
1939	—	Not contested due to the Spanish Civil War	—	—	—	—	—
1940	—	Not contested due to the Spanish Civil War	—	—	—	—	—
1941	Spain	Julián Berrendero	—	4,406 km (2,738 mi)	168h 45' 26"	+ 1' 07"	2
1942	Spain	Julián Berrendero^{*}	—	3,688 km (2,292 mi)	134h 05' 09"	+ 8' 38"	2
1943	—	Not contested due to World War II	—	—	—	—	—
1944	—	Not contested due to World War II	—	—	—	—	—
1945	Spain	Delio Rodríguez	—	3,803 km (2,363 mi)	135h 43' 55"	+ 30' 08"	6
1946	Spain	Dalmacio Langarica	—	3,836 km (2,384 mi)	137h 10' 38"	+ 17' 32"	6
1947	Belgium	Edward Van Dijck	—	3,893 km (2,419 mi)	132h 27' 00"	+ 2' 14"	2
1948	Spain	Bernardo Ruiz	Udsans–Portaminas Alas Color	3,990 km (2,480 mi)	155h 06' 30"	+ 9' 07"	3
1949	—	Not contested	—	—	—	—	—
1950	Spain	Emilio Rodríguez^{*}	—	3,932 km (2,443 mi)	134h 49' 19"	+ 15' 30"	5
1951	—	Not contested	—	—	—	—	—
1952	—	Not contested	—	—	—	—	—
1953	—	Not contested	—	—	—	—	—
1954	—	Not contested	—	—	—	—	—
1955	France	Jean Dotto	France	2,740 km (1,700 mi)	81h 04' 02"	+ 3' 06"	0
1956	Italy	Angelo Conterno	Italy	3,531 km (2,194 mi)	105h 37' 52"	+ 13"	1
1957	Spain	Jesús Loroño	Spain	2,967 km (1,844 mi)	84h 44' 06"	+ 8' 11"	1
1958	France	Jean Stablinski	France	3,241.8 km (2,014.4 mi)	94h 54' 21"	+ 2' 51"	1
1959	Spain	Antonio Suárez	Licor 43	3,048 km (1,894 mi)	84h 36' 20"	+ 1' 06"	2
1960	Belgium	Frans De Mulder	Groene Leeuw–Sinalco–SAS	3,567 km (2,216 mi)	103h 05' 57"	+ 15' 21"	4
1961	Spain	Angelino Soler	Faema	2,856.5 km (1,774.9 mi)	77h 36' 17"	+ 51"	1
1962	West Germany	Rudi Altig^{†}	Saint-Raphaël–Helyett–Hutchinson	2,813 km (1,748 mi)	78h 35' 27"	+ 7' 14"	3
1963	France	Jacques Anquetil	Saint-Raphaël–Gitane–R. Geminiani	2,442 km (1,517 mi)	64h 46' 20"	+ 3' 06"	1
1964	France	Raymond Poulidor	Mercier–BP–Hutchinson	2,860 km (1,780 mi)	78h 23' 35"	+ 33"	1
1965	West Germany	Rolf Wolfshohl	Mercier–BP–Hutchinson	3,410 km (2,120 mi)	92h 36' 03"	+ 6' 36"	0
1966	Spain	Francisco Gabica	Kas–Kaskol	2,949.5 km (1,832.7 mi)	78h 53' 55"	+ 39"	1
1967	Netherlands	Jan Janssen^{†}	Pelforth–Sauvage–Lejeune	2,941 km (1,827 mi)	76h 38' 04"	+ 1' 43"	1
1968	Italy	Felice Gimondi	Salvarani	3,014 km (1,873 mi)	78h 29' 00"	+ 2' 15"	1
1969	France	Roger Pingeon	Peugeot–BP–Michelin	2,921.4 km (1,815.3 mi)	73h 18' 45"	+ 1' 54"	2
1970	Spain	Luis Ocaña	Bic	3,568 km (2,217 mi)	89h 57' 12"	+ 1' 18"	2
1971	Belgium	Ferdinand Bracke	Peugeot–BP–Michelin	2,892 km (1,797 mi)	73h 50' 05"	+ 59"	0
1972	Spain	José Manuel Fuente^{#}	Kas–Kaskol	3,086.6 km (1,917.9 mi)	84h 34' 14"	+ 6' 34"	1
1973	Belgium	Eddy Merckx^{&}	Molteni	3,080.9 km (1,914.4 mi)	84h 40' 50"	+ 3' 46"	6
1974	Spain	José Manuel Fuente	Kas–Kaskol	2,991 km (1,859 mi)	84h 48' 18"	+ 11"	2
1975	Spain	Agustín Tamames	Super Ser	3,104.4 km (1,929.0 mi)	88h 00' 56"	+ 14"	5
1976	Spain	José Pesarrodona	Kas–Campagnolo	3,341 km (2,076 mi)	93h 19' 10"	+ 1' 03"	0
1977	Belgium	Freddy Maertens	Flandria–Velda–Latina Assicurazioni	2,785.5 km (1,730.8 mi)	78h 54' 36"	+ 2' 51"	13
1978	France	Bernard Hinault	Renault–Gitane–Campagnolo	2,990 km (1,860 mi)	85h 24' 14"	+ 3' 02"	5
1979	Netherlands	Joop Zoetemelk	Miko–Mercier–Vivagel	3,165.5 km (1,967.0 mi)	94h 57' 03"	+ 2' 43"	2
1980	Spain	Faustino Rupérez	Zor–Vereco	3,226 km (2,005 mi)	88h 23' 21"	+ 2' 15"	2
1981	Italy	Giovanni Battaglin	Inoxpran	3,531.3 km (2,194.2 mi)	98h 04' 49"	+ 2' 09"	1
1982	Spain	~~Ángel Arroyo~~ Marino Lejarreta	Teka	3,423 km (2,127 mi)	95h 47' 23"	+ 18"	1
1983	France	Bernard Hinault	Renault–Elf	3,399 km (2,112 mi)	94h 28' 26"	+ 1' 12"	2
1984	France	Éric Caritoux	Skil–Reydel–Sem–Mavic	3,361.6 km (2,088.8 mi)	90h 08' 03"	+ 6"	1
1985	Spain	Pedro Delgado	Orbea–Gin MG	3,467.6 km (2,154.7 mi)	95h 58' 00"	+ 36"	1
1986	Spain	Álvaro Pino	Zor–BH	3,675 km (2,284 mi)	98h 16' 04"	+ 1' 06"	1
1987	Colombia	Luis Herrera^{*}	Café de Colombia–Varta	3,921.4 km (2,436.6 mi)	105h 34' 25"	+ 1' 04"	1
1988	(Republic of Ireland) Ireland	Sean Kelly^{†}	Kas–Canal 10	3,428.4 km (2,130.3 mi)	89h 19' 23"	+ 1' 27"	2
1989	Spain	Pedro Delgado	Reynolds	3,656.6 km (2,272.1 mi)	93h 01' 17"	+ 35"	2
1990	Italy	Marco Giovannetti	Seur	3,711 km (2,306 mi)	94h 36' 00"	+ 1' 28"	0
1991	Spain	Melcior Mauri	ONCE	3,213.2 km (1,996.6 mi)	82h 48' 07"	+ 2' 52"	3
1992	Switzerland	Tony Rominger	CLAS–Cajastur	3,558.1 km (2,210.9 mi)	96h 14' 50"	+ 1' 04"	1
1993	Switzerland	Tony Rominger^{‡}	CLAS–Cajastur	3,585.5 km (2,227.9 mi)	96h 07' 03"	+ 29"	3
1994	Switzerland	Tony Rominger	Mapei–CLAS	3,531.1 km (2,194.1 mi)	92h 07' 48"	+ 7' 28"	6
1995	France	Laurent Jalabert^{‡}	ONCE	3,637.6 km (2,260.3 mi)	95h 30' 33"	+ 4' 22"	5
1996	Switzerland	Alex Zülle	ONCE	3,947 km (2,453 mi)	97h 31' 46"	+ 6' 23"	1
1997	Switzerland	Alex Zülle	ONCE	3,759.2 km (2,335.9 mi)	91h 15' 55"	+ 5' 07"	1
1998	Spain	Abraham Olano	Banesto	3,781 km (2,349 mi)	93h 44' 08"	+ 1' 23"	1
1999	Germany	Jan Ullrich	Team Telekom	3,548.7 km (2,205.1 mi)	89h 52' 03"	+ 4' 15"	2
2000	Spain	Roberto Heras^{†}	Kelme–Costa Blanca	2,894 km (1,798 mi)	70h 26' 14"	+ 2' 33"	2
2001	Spain	Ángel Casero	Festina	3,012.2 km (1,871.7 mi)	70h 49' 05"	+ 47"	0
2002	Spain	Aitor González	Kelme–Costa Blanca	3,128.7 km (1,944.1 mi)	75h 13' 52"	+ 2' 14"	3
2003	Spain	Roberto Heras	U.S. Postal Service	2,958.3 km (1,838.2 mi)	69h 31' 52"	+ 28"	1
2004	Spain	Roberto Heras^{#}	Liberty Seguros	2,894 km (1,798 mi)	77h 42' 46"	+ 2' 13"	1
2005	Spain	Roberto Heras (Note: Roberto Heras was the winner at the podium ceremony in Madrid on the last day of the 2005 Vuelta a España, but subsequently was found to have tested positive for performance-enhancing drugs during stage 20 of the race. The Spanish cycling federation found him guilty of using erythropoietin during the race and stripped him of his title, awarding the win to Denis Menchov. However, in 2012 Roberto Heras was reinstated as the 2005 Vuelta a España champion when Spain's supreme court ruled in favor of Heras, citing procedural violations relating to the storage and handling of the urine samples.)	Liberty Seguros–Würth	3,356 km (2,085 mi)	82h 22' 55"	+ 4' 36"	2
2006	Kazakhstan	Alexander Vinokourov^{#}	Astana	3,202.1 km (1,989.7 mi)	81h 23' 07"	+ 1' 12"	3
2007	Russia	Denis Menchov^{#}	Rabobank	3,291.3 km (2,045.1 mi)	80h 59' 07"	+ 3' 31"	1
2008	Spain	Alberto Contador^{#}	Astana	3,142.5 km (1,952.7 mi)	80h 40' 08"	+ 46"	2
2009	Spain	Alejandro Valverde^{#}	Caisse d'Epargne	3,293.6 km (2,046.5 mi)	87h 22' 37"	+ 55"	1
2010	Italy	Vincenzo Nibali^{#}	Liquigas–Doimo	3,333.8 km (2,071.5 mi)	87h 18' 33"	+ 3' 02"	0
2011	(United Kingdom) Great Britain	~~Juan José Cobo~~ Chris Froome^{#}	Team Sky	3,300 km (2,100 mi)	84h 59' 44"	+ 1' 39"	1
2012	Spain	Alberto Contador	Saxo Bank–Tinkoff Bank	3,360.2 km (2,087.9 mi)	84h 59' 49"	+1' 16"	1
2013	United States	Chris Horner^{#}	RadioShack–Leopard	3,358.9 km (2,087.1 mi)	84h 36' 04"	+ 37"	2
2014	Spain	Alberto Contador^{#}	Tinkoff–Saxo	3,181.5 km (1,976.9 mi)	81h 25' 05"	+1' 10"	2
2015	Italy	Fabio Aru	Astana	3,358.1 km (2,086.6 mi)	85h 36' 13"	+ 57"	0
2016	Colombia	Nairo Quintana^{#}	Movistar Team	3,315.4 km (2,060.1 mi)	83h 31' 28"	+ 1' 23"	1
2017	(United Kingdom) Great Britain	Chris Froome^{&}	Team Sky	3,324.1 km (2,065.5 mi)	82h 30' 02"	+ 2' 15"	2
2018	(United Kingdom) Great Britain	Simon Yates^{#}	Mitchelton–Scott	3,271.4 km (2,032.8 mi)	82h 05' 58"	+ 1' 46"	1
2019	Slovenia	Primož Roglič^{†}	Team Jumbo–Visma	3,290.7 km (2,044.7 mi)	83h 07' 31"	+ 2' 33"	1
2020	Slovenia	Primož Roglič^{†}	Team Jumbo–Visma	2,892.6 km (1,797.4 mi)	72h 46' 12"	+ 24"	4
2021	Slovenia	Primož Roglič	Team Jumbo–Visma	3,417 km (2,123 mi)	83h 55' 29"	+ 4' 42"	4
2022	Belgium	Remco Evenepoel	Quick-Step Alpha Vinyl Team	3,280.5 km (2,038.4 mi)	80h 26' 59"	+ 2' 02"	2
2023	United States	Sepp Kuss	Team Jumbo–Visma	3,153.8 km (1,959.7 mi)	76h 48' 21"	+ 17"	1
2024	Slovenia	Primož Roglič	Red Bull–Bora–Hansgrohe	3,304.3 km (2,053.2 mi)	81h 49' 18"	+ 2' 36"	3
2025	Denmark	Jonas Vingegaard	Visma–Lease a Bike	3,304.3 km (2,053.2 mi)	74h 20' 28"	+ 1' 16"	3
2026	Spain	Enric Mas	Movistar Team	3,310.6 km (2,057.1 mi)	73h 52' 55"	+ 2' 15"	1

=== Multiple winners ===
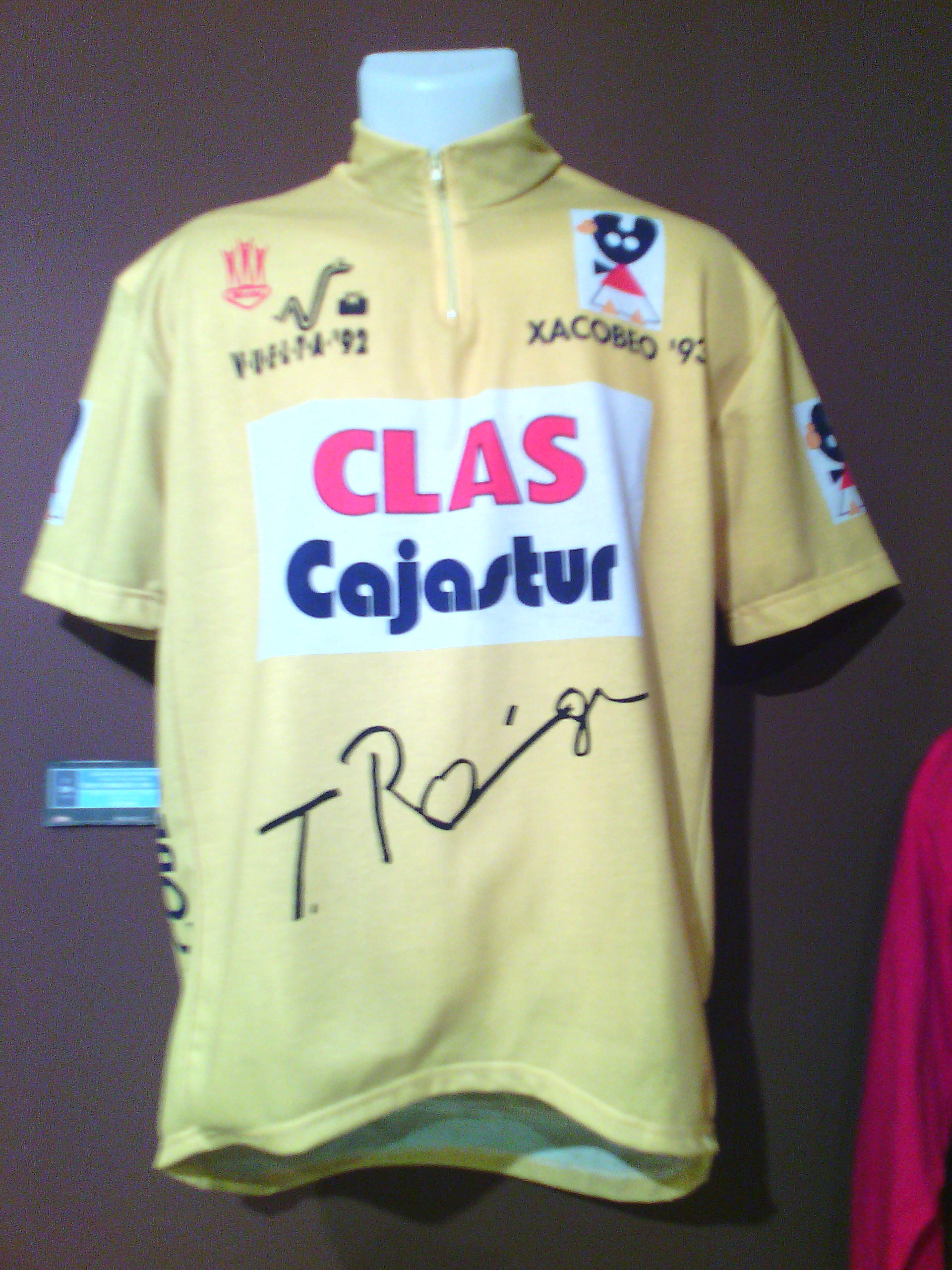
Leader's jersey worn by three-time winner Tony Rominger at the 1992 Vuelta a España

Multiple winners of the Vuelta a España general classification
Cyclist	Total	Years
Roberto Heras (ESP)	4	2000, 2003, 2004, 2005
Primož Roglič (SLO)	4	2019, 2020, 2021, 2024
Tony Rominger (SUI)	3	1992, 1993, 1994
Alberto Contador (ESP)	3	2008, 2012, 2014
Gustaaf Deloor (BEL)	2	1935, 1936
Julián Berrendero (ESP)	2	1941, 1942
José Manuel Fuente (ESP)	2	1972, 1974
Bernard Hinault (FRA)	2	1978, 1983
Pedro Delgado (ESP)	2	1985, 1989
Alex Zülle (SUI)	2	1996, 1997
Chris Froome (GBR)	2	2011, 2017

=== By nationality ===
Vuelta a España general classification winners by nationality
Nationality	No. of winning cyclists	No. of wins
Spain	25	33
France	8	9
Belgium	7	8
Italy	6	6
Switzerland	2	5
Slovenia	1	4
Germany	3	3
Great Britain	2	3
Colombia	2	2
United States	2	2
Netherlands	2	2
Ireland	1	1
Kazakhstan	1	1
Russia	1	1
Denmark	1	1

== Bibliography ==
- Fotheringham, William (2012). Merckx: Half Man, Half Bike. Yellow Jersey Press. ISBN 9780224074483.
- Howard, Paul (2011). Sex, Lies and Handlebar Tape. Random House. ISBN 978-1845969615.
