= 1947 Vuelta a España =

Race details
- Dates: 12 May - 5 June
- Stages: 24
- Distance: 3,893 km (2,419 mi)
- Winning time: 132h 27' 00"

Results
| Jersey awarded to the overall winner | Winner | Edouard Van Dyck (BEL) |
| | Second | Manuel Costa (ESP) |
| | Third | Delio Rodríguez (ESP) |
| | Mountains | Emilio Rodríguez (ESP) |

The 7th Vuelta a España (Tour of Spain), a long-distance bicycle stage race and one of the three grand tours, was held from 12 May to 5 June 1947. It consisted of 24 stages covering a total of 3,893 km (2,419 mi), and was won by Edouard Van Dyck. Emilio Rodríguez won the mountains classification.

== Route ==
List of stages
| Stage | Date | Course | Distance | Type | Winner |
|---|---|---|---|---|---|
| 1 | 12 May | Madrid to Albacete | 243 km (151 mi) | | Delio Rodríguez (ESP) |
| 2 | 13 May | Albacete to Murcia | 146 km (91 mi) | | Emilio Rodríguez (ESP) |
| 3 | 14 May | Murcia to Alcoy | 135 km (84 mi) | | Julián Berrendero (ESP) |
| 4 | 15 May | Alcoy to Castellón | 175 km (109 mi) | | Adolphe Deledda (ITA) |
| 5 | 16 May | Castellón to Tarragona | 222 km (138 mi) | | Delio Rodríguez (ESP) |
| 6 | 18 May | Tarragona to Barcelona | 119 km (74 mi) | | Cipriano Aguirrezabal (ESP) |
| 7 | 19 May | Barcelona to Lleida | 162 km (101 mi) | | Cipriano Aguirrezabal (ESP) |
| 8 | 20 May | Lleida to Zaragoza | 144 km (89 mi) | | Delio Rodríguez (ESP) |
| 9 | 21 May | Zaragoza to Pamplona | 176 km (109 mi) | | Félix Adriano (ITA) |
| 10 | 22 May | Pamplona to San Sebastián | 107 km (66 mi) | | Delio Rodríguez (ESP) |
| 11 | 24 May | San Sebastián to Bilbao | 229 km (142 mi) | | Félix Adriano (ITA) |
| 12 | 25 May | Bilbao to Santander | 212 km (132 mi) | | Félix Adriano (ITA) |
| 13 | 26 May | Santander to Reinosa | 201 km (125 mi) | | Joaquín Jiménez (ESP) |
| 14 | 27 May | Reinosa to Gijón | 204 km (127 mi) | | Delio Rodríguez (ESP) |
| 15 | 29 May | Gijón to Oviedo | 105 km (65 mi) | | Delio Rodríguez (ESP) |
| 16a | 30 May | Oviedo to Luarca | 101 km (63 mi) | | Bruno Bertolucci (ITA) |
| 16b | 30 May | Luarca to Ribadeo | 70 km (43 mi) | Individual time trial | Edward Van Dijck (BEL) |
| 17 | 31 May | Ribadeo to Ferrol | 159 km (99 mi) | | Senén Mesa (ESP) |
| 18 | 31 May | Ferrol to A Coruña | 70 km (43 mi) | | Delio Rodríguez (ESP) |
| 19 | 1 June | A Coruña to Vigo | 180 km (112 mi) | | Alejandro Fombellida (ESP) |
| 20 | 2 June | Vigo to Ourense | 105 km (65 mi) | | Félix Adriano (ITA) |
| 21 | 3 June | Ourense to Astorga | 228 km (142 mi) | | Alejandro Fombellida (ESP) |
| 22 | 4 June | Astorga to León | 47 km (29 mi) | Individual time trial | Edward Van Dijck (BEL) |
| 23 | 4 June | León to Valladolid | 133 km (83 mi) | | Delio Rodríguez (ESP) |
| 24 | 5 June | Valladolid to Madrid | 220 km (137 mi) | | Joaquín Olmos (ESP) |
| | Total | | 3,893 km (2,419 mi) | | |

== Final classification standings ==
=== General Classification ===
Final general classification (1–27)
| Rank | Rider | Team | Time |
|---|---|---|---|
| 1 | (Belgium) Edouard Van Dyck | | 132h 27' 00" |
| 2 | (Spain) Manuel Costa | | + 2' 14" |
| 3 | (Spain) Delio Rodríguez | | + 11' 04" |
| 4 | (Spain) Emilio Rodríguez | | + 25' 55" |
| 5 | (Spain) Joaquín Olmos | | + 39' 45" |
| 6 | (Spain) Julián Berrendero | | + 40' 30" |
| 7 | (Italy) Domenico Pedrali | | + 52' 58" |
| 8 | (Italy) Felix Adriano | | + 1h 00' 09" |
| 9 | (Belgium) Rik Renders | | + 1h 04' 30" |
| 10 | (Spain) José Pérez Llácer | | + 1h 18' 55" |
| 11 | (Netherlands) Frans Pauwels | | + 2h 10' 35" |
| 12 | (Spain) Pedro Font | | + 2h 21' 44" |
| 13 | (Spain) José Lahoz | | + 2h 34' 30" |
| 14 | (Spain) Vicente Carretero | | + 2h 46' 30" |
| 15 | (Spain) José Antonio Landa | | + 2h 58' 17" |
| 16 | (Netherlands) Charles van de Voorde | | + 2h 59' 21" |
| 17 | (Spain) Senen Blanco | | + 3h 41' 05" |
| 18 | (Spain) Joaquín Jiménez | | + 3h 55' 55" |
| 19 | (Spain) José Escolano | | + 4h 56' 44" |
| 20 | (Spain) Arturo Ponte | | + 5h 07' 03" |
| 21 | (Spain) Andrés Morán | | + 5h 07' 05" |
| 22 | (Italy) Bruno Bertolucci | | + 5h 28' 08" |
| 23 | (Spain) Alejandro Fombellida | | + 6h 18' 08" |
| 24 | (Spain) José Casorrán | | + 7h 21' 17" |
| 25 | (Spain) Martín Mancisidor | | + 8h 20' 03" |
| 26 | (Spain) Pascual Laza | | + 11h 01' 13" |
| 27 | (Spain) Ángel Alonso | | + 12h 49' 38" |

=== Mountain classification ===
Final mountain classification (1–7)
| Rank | Rider | Points |
|---|---|---|
| 1 | (Spain) Emilio Rodríguez | 29 |
| 2 | (Spain) Martín Mancisidor | 26 |
| 3 | (Spain) Manuel Costa | 24 |
| 4 | (Italy) Félix Adriano | 18 |
| 5 | (Spain) Julián Berrendero | 13 |
| 6 | (Spain) José Lahoz | 10 |
| 7 | (Spain) Pedro Font | 9 |
