= Joaquín Olmos =

Spanish cyclist (1915–2002)

Personal information
- Full name: Joaquín Olmos Forés
- Born: 15 September 1915 Benicarló, Spain
- Died: 22 February 2002 (aged 86) Barcelona, Spain

Cycling career
- Sport: Cycling
- Discipline: Road
- Role: Rider

Professional teams
- 1935–1936: UC Barceloneta
- 1937: AV Hostafranc
- 1940: UC Barceloneta
- 1941–1943: FC Barcelona
- 1944: RCD Espanyol
- 1945: UC Hospitalet–Galindo
- 1946–1948: Galindo
- 1948: Santamaria
- 1949: UC Hospitalet
- 1950: CC Barcelonès
- 1951: UC Hospitalet

Joaquín Olmos Forés (15 September 1915 – 22 February 2002) was a Spanish racing cyclist. He won 5 stages of the Vuelta a España throughout his career.

== Major results ==
1936
10th Overall Volta a Catalunya
1939
8th Overall Volta a Catalunya
1942
1st Stage 15 Vuelta a España
1944
3rd National Cyclo-cross Championships
1945
1st Stages 7 & 19 Vuelta a España
2nd National Road Race Championships
2nd GP Pascuas
3rd Trofeo del Sprint
1946
1st Stage 1 Vuelta a España
1947
1st Overall Vuelta a la Comunidad Valenciana

1st Stage 2

3rd Trofeo Masferrer
5th Overall Vuelta a España

1st Stage 22

1948
3rd Trofeo del Sprint
