= Adolphe Deledda =

Italian-French cyclist

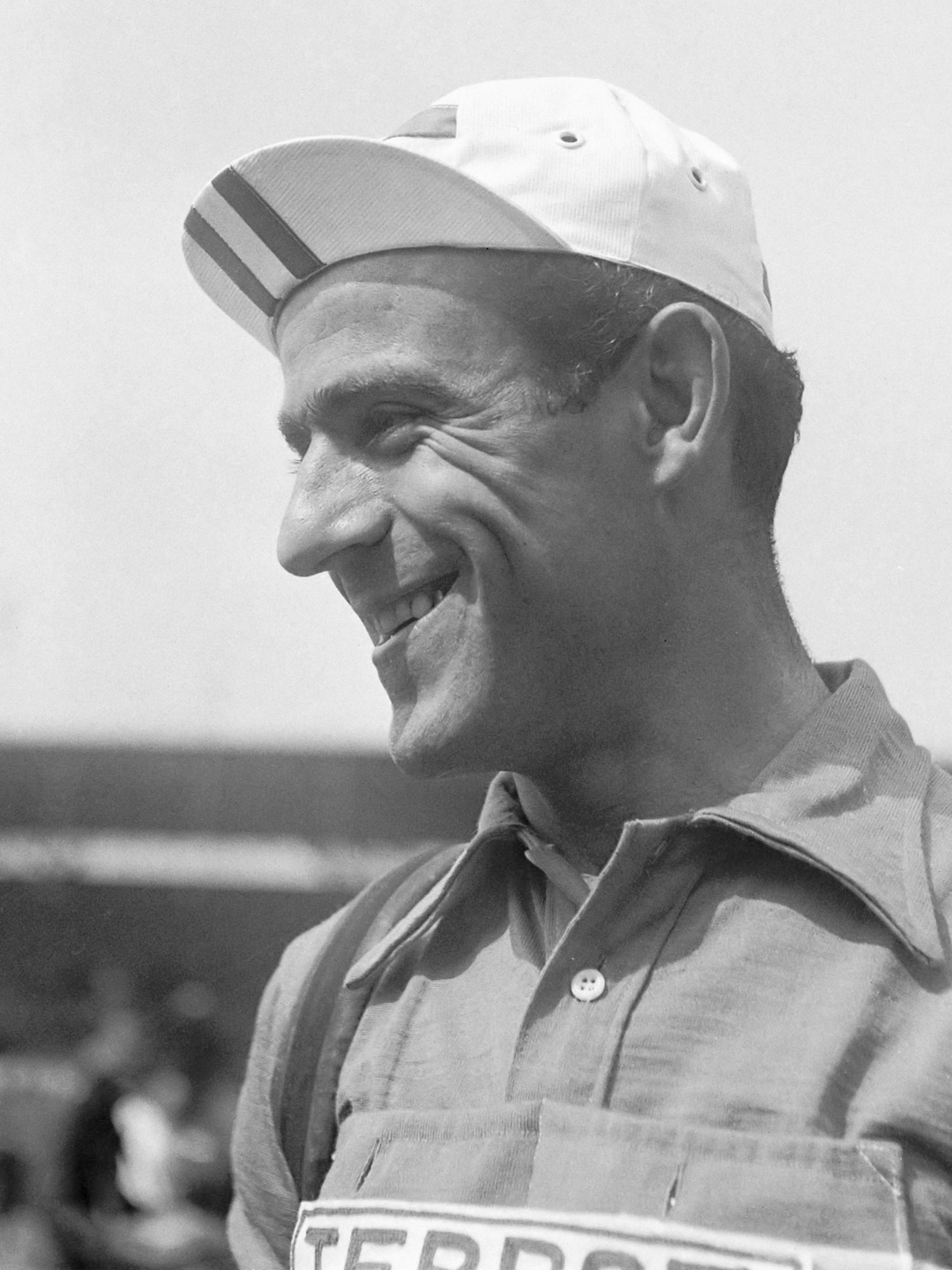

Personal information
- Full name: Adolphe Deledda
- Born: 26 September 1919 Villa Minozzo, Italy
- Died: 9 October 2003 (aged 84) Die, France

Cycling career
- Sport: Cycling
- Discipline: Road
- Role: Rider

Major wins
- French National Road Race Champion (1952); 2 stages Tour de France

Adolphe Deledda (Villa Minozzo (Italy), 28 September 1919 – Die, 23 July 2003) was an Italian/French professional road bicycle racer. Italian by birth, he was naturalized French on 20 April 1948.

== Major results ==
1943
Circuit de Drome – Ardèche
1945
Chalon-sur-Saone
1947
Vuelta a España:

Winner stage 4

1949
Tour du Doubs
Tour de France:

Winner stage 6

1951
Tour de France:

Winner stage 24

1952
France national road race champion
1955
G.P.Morange
