= Manuel Costa (cyclist) =

Spanish cyclist (born 1921)

Personal information
- Born: 11 October 1921 Vilafranca del Penedès, Spain

Cycling career
- Sport: Cycling
- Current team: Retired
- Discipline: Road
- Role: Rider

Professional teams
- 1941–1943: FC Barcelona
- 1944: RCD Español
- 1945: UD Sans
- 1946: Galindo–UC García
- 1947: Galindo–Tabay
- 1947–1948: Santamaria
- 1948: Galindo

Manuel Costa (born 11 October 1921) was a Spanish professional road racing cyclist. He held the red leader's jersey for twelve days during the 1946 Vuelta a España, ultimately finishing in fourth place. He had a similar feat the following edition, where he finished second in the overall standings, after eleven days in the lead.

== Major results ==
1943
4th Overall Volta a Catalunya

1st Stage 2

1946
4th Overall Vuelta a España
1947
2nd Overall Vuelta a España
1948
3rd Overall Volta a Tarragona

1st Stage 2

6th Overall Vuelta a España
