= Edward Van Dijck =

Belgian cyclist

- Van Dijck after winning the 1947 Vuelta a España

Personal information
- Full name: Edward Van Dijck
- Born: 22 March 1918 Herent, Belgium
- Died: 22 April 1977 (aged 59) Leuven, Belgium

Cycling career
- Sport: Cycling
- Discipline: Road
- Role: Rider

Professional teams
- 1942–43: Helyett-Hutchinson
- 1944: A. Trialoux-Wolber
- 1946: Cycles Roberty
- 1947–48: Garin-Wolber & Alcyon-Dunlop
- 1948: Garin-Wolber & Mondia
- 1949: Terrot-Hutchinson
- 1950: Allegro
- 1950–51: Terrot-Wolber
- 1952: Terrot-Hutchinson

Major wins
- Grand Tours Tour de France 1 individual stage (1948) Vuelta a España General classification (1947) 2 individual stages (1947) One-day races and Classics Grand Prix de Wallonie (1943) Brussels–Ingooigem (1946) Ronde van Limburg (1946)

Edward (Ward) Van Dijck (22 March 1918 – 22 April 1977) was a Belgian professional road bicycle racer during the 1940s and 1950s.

Van Dijck became the second Belgian to win the Spanish Grand Tour at the 1947 Vuelta a España—which covered 24 stages and 3,893 km—upsetting Spaniards Manuel Costa and 1945 Vuelta champion Delio Rodríguez. The following year, he won the 16th stage in the Tour de France.

== Major results ==
1939
1st Bruxelles-Luxembourg-Mondorf
3rd Binche-Tournai-Binche
1940
1st Championship of Hainaut (independents)
2nd Belgian National Road Race Championships, road race (independents)
1941
1st Stage 2 Omloop van België
1st Muur Classic Geraardsbergen
1942
1st Anvers-Gand-Anvers
1943
1st Grand Prix de Wallonie
1st Roosbeek
3rd De Drie Zustersteden
10th Liège–Bastogne–Liège
1944
1st Bertem
1st Verviers
2nd Dwars door West-Vlaanderen
3rd Ronde van Limburg
1945
1st Stage 4 Tour of Belgium
1st Bertem
2nd Liège–Bastogne–Liège
3rd Ronde van Limburg
6th Tour of Flanders
1946
1st Brussels–Ingooigem
1st Ronde van Limburg
1st Overall Omnium de la Route

1st Stage 2

1st GP Beeckman
3rd La Flèche Wallonne
6th Liège–Bastogne–Liège
1947
1st Overall Vuelta a España

Winner Stages 16b and 21a

2nd Schaal Sels
2nd Tour de Lorraine
1948
Tour de France

Winner Stage 16

2nd Brussel–Sint-Truiden
3rd Bruxelles-Bost
7th Overall Tour of Belgium
8th Liège–Bastogne–Liège
1949
1st Rijkevorsel
2nd Circuit de la Côte d'Or
3rd Overall Tour d'Algérie

1st Stages 6, 9 & 17

3rd Liège–Bastogne–Liège
1950
1st GP Stad Vilvoorde
1951
1st Leuven
2nd Dokter Tistaertprijs Zottegem
