= José Pérez Llácer =

Spanish cyclist (1927–2006)

Personal information
- Born: 26 January 1927
- Died: 16 July 2006 (aged 79)

Cycling career
- Sport: Cycling
- Role: Rider

José Pérez Llácer (26 January 1927 – 16 July 2006) was a Spanish racing cyclist. He rode in the 1952 Tour de France.
