= Frans Pauwels =

Dutch cyclist

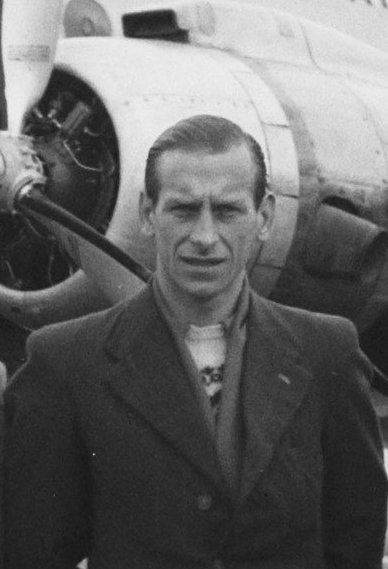
- Frans Pauwels

Personal information
- Born: 8 September 1918 Kieldrecht, Belgium
- Died: 24 January 2001 (aged 82) Memphis, Tennessee, United States

Cycling career
- Sport: Cycling
- Role: Rider

Frans Pauwels (8 September 1918 – 24 January 2001) was a Dutch racing cyclist. He rode in the 1948 and 1949 Tour de France.
