= Rik Renders =

Belgian cyclist

Personal information
- Born: 6 November 1922 Hekelgem, Belgium
- Died: 24 December 2008 (aged 86) Aalst, Belgium

Cycling career
- Sport: Cycling
- Role: Rider

Rik Renders (6 November 1922 – 24 December 2008) was a Belgian racing cyclist. He rode in the 1948 Tour de France.
