= Emilio Rodríguez (cyclist) =

Spanish cyclist (1923–1984)

Personal information
- Full name: Emilio Rodríguez
- Born: 28 November 1923 Ponteareas, Spain
- Died: 21 February 1984 (aged 60) Ponteareas, Spain

Cycling career
- Sport: Cycling
- Discipline: Road
- Role: Rider

Major wins
- Grand Tours Vuelta a España General classification (1950) Mountains classification (1946, 1947, 1950) 6 individual stages (1947, 1950) Stage races Volta a Catalunya (1947, 1948)

Emilio Rodríguez Barros (28 November 1923, Ponteareas, Spain – 21 February 1984, Ponteareas, Spain) was a Spanish professional road bicycle racer from Ponteareas who won the King of the Mountains classification at Vuelta a España three times and captured the overall title at the 1950 Vuelta a España. Rodríguez's two brothers were also professional cyclists - his older brother Delio won the 1945 Vuelta a España and in total won 39 stages at the Vuelta a España. Emilio's other brother Manolo finished second in the general classification of the edition that Emilio won.

== Major results ==
1946
1st Overall Tour of Galicia
8th Overall Vuelta a España

1st Mountains classification

1947
1st Overall Volta a Catalunya

1st Stage 2

1st Overall Vuelta a Asturias
1st Overall Tour of Galicia
1st Stage 1 Vuelta a Burgos
4th Overall Vuelta a España

1st Mountains classification
1st Stage 2

1948
1st Overall Volta a Catalunya
1st Overall Volta a la Comunitat Valenciana
2nd Overall Vuelta a España
1950
1st Overall Vuelta a España

1st Mountains classification
1st Stages 3, 4b, 6, 7 & 22

1954
1st Road race, National Road Championships
4th Overall Euskal Bizikleta
1955
1st Overall Tour of Galicia
5th Overall Vuelta a Asturias

1st Stage 1
