= Julián Berrendero =

Spanish cyclist (1912–1995)

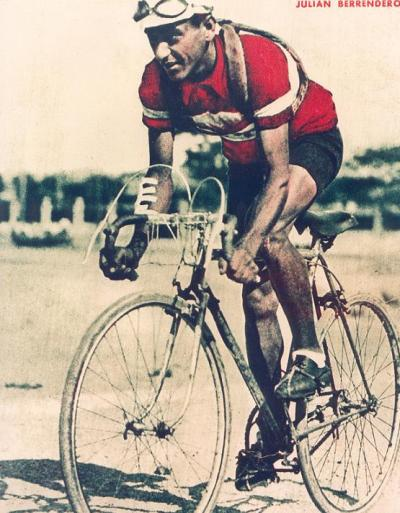

Personal information
- Full name: Julián Berrendero Martín
- Born: 8 April 1912 San Agustín del Guadalix, Spain
- Died: 1 August 1995 (aged 83) Madrid, Spain

Cycling career
- Sport: Cycling
- Discipline: Road
- Role: Rider

Major wins
- Grand Tours Tour de France Mountains classification (1936) 1 individual stage (1937) Vuelta a España General classification (1941, 1942) Mountains classification (1942, 1945) 11 individual stages (1941, 1942, 1945, 1946, 1947, 1948) One-day races and Classics National Road Race Championships (1942, 1943, 1944)

Julián Berrendero Martín (born San Agustín del Guadalix, 8 April 1912, died Madrid, 1 August 1995) was a Spanish road racing cyclist. He is most famous for having won the third and fourth editions of the Vuelta a España in 1941 and 1942. He won the 1941 race after having spent 18 months in a Francoist concentration camp. In addition, he won a total of three mountains jerseys at the Vuelta and the Tour de France

1. “Berrendero was a marked man, a public figure who had supported the Republican cause. As soon as he reached the Spanish border, Franco’s men arrested him and threw him into a concentration camp, where he remained for 18 months. He survived the camps, which were characterized by disease, malnourishment and frequent beatings, but to what physical and mental cost? He was only 27 and should have been at the height of his cycling career.”

== Major results ==
1935
GP Eibar
Tour of Galicia
1936
GP Republica (incl. 3 stages)
Tour de France:

Winner Mountains classification
11th place overall classification

1937
Tour de France:

Winner stage 15
15th place overall classification

1938
Tour de France:

29th place overall classification

1941
Circuito de Getxo
Vuelta a Navarra
Vuelta a España:

Winner stages 1 and 20
Winner overall classification

1942
(Spain) Spanish National Road Race Championship
(Spain) Spanish National Cyclo-Cross Championship
Volta a la Comunitat Valenciana
Vuelta a España:

Winner overall classification
Winner Mountains classification
Winner stages 1 and 9B

1943
(Spain) Spanish National Road Race Championship
Volta a Catalunya
Trofeo Masferrer
1944
(Spain) Spanish National Road Race Championship
(Spain) Spanish National Cyclo-Cross Championship
Circuito de Getxo
Clásica a los Puertos de Guadarrama
1945
San Antonio de Durango
Vuelta a España:

2nd place overall classification
Winner Mountains classification
Winner stages 1 and 17

1946
Volta a Catalunya
Vuelta a España:

2nd place overall classification
Winner stages 4, 18B and 20

1947
Clásica a los Puertos de Guadarrama
Vuelta a España:

Winner stage 3
6th place overall classification

1948
Vuelta a España:

Winner stage 1A
