= List of teams and cyclists in the 1930 Tour de France =

List of cyclists

In the 1930 Tour de France, for the first time, the Tour was run with national teams. Belgium, Italy, Spain, Germany and France each sent a team composed of eight cyclists. Additionally, 60 cyclists started as touriste-routiers, most of them French. Some of them were grouped in regional teams.

One of the notable cyclists was Alfredo Binda, riding in the Italian national team. He had dominated the Giro d'Italia in the recent years, winning the 1925, 1927, 1928 and 1929 editions; in 1929 he had done so by winning eight consecutive stages. For the 1930 Giro d'Italia, he was paid money not to compete, so he started in the Tour de France that year. The French team was captained by Victor Fontan, who had been leading the 1929 Tour de France until he had to abandon the race due to mechanical problems. The Belgian team had Jef Demuysere as the favourite.

== By team ==
Legend
Starting number worn by the rider during the Tour
Position in the general classification
Denotes a rider who did not finish

Belgium
No.		Pos.
1	Jean Aerts	DNF
2	Aimé Dossche	12
3	Jef Demuysere	4
4	Jan Mertens	15
5	Frans Bonduel	7
6	Louis De Lannoy	11
7	Georges Laloup	19
8	Omer Taverne	30

France
No.		Pos.
33	Charles Pélissier	9
34	Victor Fontan	DNF
35	Jules Merviel	21
36	Marcel Bidot	5
37	Antonin Magne	3
38	André Leducq	1
39	Pierre Magne	6
40	Joseph Mauclair	DNF

Italy
No.		Pos.
9	Alfredo Binda	DNF
10	Domenico Piemontesi	DNF
11	Gaetano Belloni	DNF
12	Learco Guerra	2
13	Giuseppe Pancera	20
14	Leonida Frascarelli	DNF
15	Felice Gremo	DNF
16	Marco Giuntelli	31

Touriste-routier
No.		Pos.
101	Marcel Masson	51
102	Léopold Boisselle	40
103	Georges Petit	57
104	Charles Cottalorda	54
105	Battista Berardi	48
107	Pierre Charton	DNF
108	François Moreels	25
109	Armand Goubert	43
110	Odile Tailleu	DNF
111	Henri Prévost	46
112	Henri Gottrand	42
113	Charles Cento	DNF
114	Georges Berton	23
115	Pierre Bobo	58
116	Edouard Teisseire	52
117	Paulin Lanteri	55
118	Lucien Lange	50
119	Fernand Moulet	DNF
120	Emile Faillu	56
121	Maurice Arnoult	DNF
122	Benoît Fauré	8
123	Marcel Folliot	DNF
124	Jean-Baptiste Ampurias	53
125	Auguste Encrine	32
126	Ubaldo Merlo	DNF
127	Marcel Ilpide	59
128	Pierre Jouel	38
129	Guy Bariffi	49
130	Louis Peglion	14
131	Adrien Plautin	39
132	Marcel Mazeyrat	18
134	Fernand Fayolle	DNF
135	Paul Delbart	44
136	Jean Martinet	45
137	Marcel Huot	DNF
138	Eugen Werner	DNF
139	Secundo Martinetto	DNF
141	Remi Verschaetse	DNF
142	Henri Touzard	37
144	Albert Barthélémy	DNF
145	Henri Simonin	DNF
146	Julien Perrain	DNF
147	Louis Bajard	29
148	Gaston Persigan	DNF
149	Jean Goulème	26
150	François Ondet	28
152	Marcel Tissier	47
153	Lucien Buysse	DNF
154	Omer Huyse	DNF
155	Ernest Mottard	DNF
156	Jérôme Declercq	DNF
158	Aurelio Menegazzi	DNF
166	Fernand Bruynooghe	DNF
167	Candida Badal	DNF
168	Fernand Robache	41
169	Lucien Laval	35
171	Lorenzo Fortuno	DNF
182	André Souchard	DNF
184	Raymond Lales	DNF
186	Giovanni Roncon	DNF

Spain
No.		Pos.
17	Salvador Cardona	16
18	Jose Trueba	36
19	Valeriano Riera	17
20	Francisco Cepeda	27
21	Vicente Trueba	24
22	Jean Mateu	34
23	Jesus Dermit	DNF
24	Nicolas Tubau	DNF

Germany
No.		Pos.
25	Felix Manthey	22
26	Rudolf Wolke	DNF
27	Herbert Nebe	DNF
28	Adolf Schön	10
29	Oskar Thierbach	13
30	Alfred Siegel	33
31	Hermann Buse	DNF
32	Oskar Tietz	DNF

== By rider ==
Legend
No.	Starting number worn by the rider during the Tour
Pos.	Position in the general classification
DNF	Denotes a rider who did not finish

No.	Name	Nationality	Team	Pos.	Ref
1	Jean Aerts	Belgium	Belgium	DNF	
2	Aimé Dossche	Belgium	Belgium	12	
3	Jef Demuysere	Belgium	Belgium	4	
4	Jan Mertens	Belgium	Belgium	15	
5	Frans Bonduel	Belgium	Belgium	7	
6	Louis De Lannoy	Belgium	Belgium	11	
7	Georges Laloup	Belgium	Belgium	19	
8	Omer Taverne	Belgium	Belgium	30	
9	Alfredo Binda	Italy	Italy	DNF	
10	Domenico Piemontesi	Italy	Italy	DNF	
11	Gaetano Belloni	Italy	Italy	DNF	
12	Learco Guerra	Italy	Italy	2	
13	Giuseppe Pancera	Italy	Italy	20	
14	Leonida Frascarelli	Italy	Italy	DNF	
15	Felice Gremo	Italy	Italy	DNF	
16	Marco Giuntelli	Italy	Italy	31	
17	Salvador Cardona	Spain	Spain	16	
18	Jose Trueba	Spain	Spain	36	
19	Valeriano Riera	Spain	Spain	17	
20	Francisco Cepeda	Spain	Spain	27	
21	Vicente Trueba	Spain	Spain	24	
22	Jean Mateu	Spain	Spain	34	
23	Jesus Dermit	Spain	Spain	DNF	
24	Nicolas Tubau	Spain	Spain	DNF	
25	Felix Manthey	Germany	Germany	22	
26	Rudolf Wolke	Germany	Germany	DNF	
27	Herbert Nebe	Germany	Germany	DNF	
28	Adolf Schön	Germany	Germany	10	
29	Oskar Thierbach	Germany	Germany	13	
30	Alfred Siegel	Germany	Germany	33	
31	Hermann Buse	Germany	Germany	DNF	
32	Oskar Tietz	Germany	Germany	DNF	
33	Charles Pélissier	France	France	9	
34	Victor Fontan	France	France	DNF	
35	Jules Merviel	France	France	21	
36	Marcel Bidot	France	France	5	
37	Antonin Magne	France	France	3	
38	André Leducq	France	France	1	
39	Pierre Magne	France	France	6	
40	Joseph Mauclair	France	France	DNF	
101	Marcel Masson	France	Touriste-routier	51	
102	Léopold Boisselle	France	Touriste-routier	40	
103	Georges Petit	France	Touriste-routier	57	
104	Charles Cottalorda	France	Touriste-routier	54	
105	Battista Berardi	Italy	Touriste-routier	48	
107	Pierre Charton	France	Touriste-routier	DNF	
108	François Moreels	France	Touriste-routier	25	
109	Armand Goubert	France	Touriste-routier	43	
110	Odile Tailleu	Belgium	Touriste-routier	DNF	
111	Henri Prévost	France	Touriste-routier	46	
112	Henri Gottrand	France	Touriste-routier	42	
113	Charles Cento	France	Touriste-routier	DNF	
114	Georges Berton	France	Touriste-routier	23	
115	Pierre Bobo	France	Touriste-routier	58	
116	Edouard Teisseire	France	Touriste-routier	52	
117	Paulin Lanteri	France	Touriste-routier	55	
118	Lucien Lange	France	Touriste-routier	50	
119	Fernand Moulet	France	Touriste-routier	DNF	
120	Emile Faillu	France	Touriste-routier	56	
121	Maurice Arnoult	France	Touriste-routier	DNF	
122	Benoît Fauré	France	Touriste-routier	8	
123	Marcel Folliot	France	Touriste-routier	DNF	
124	Jean-Baptiste Ampurias	France	Touriste-routier	53	
125	Auguste Encrine	France	Touriste-routier	32	
126	Ubaldo Merlo	Italy	Touriste-routier	DNF	
127	Marcel Ilpide	France	Touriste-routier	59	
128	Pierre Jouel	France	Touriste-routier	38	
129	Guy Bariffi	Switzerland	Touriste-routier	49	
130	Louis Peglion	France	Touriste-routier	14	
131	Adrien Plautin	France	Touriste-routier	39	
132	Marcel Mazeyrat	France	Touriste-routier	18	
134	Fernand Fayolle	France	Touriste-routier	DNF	
135	Paul Delbart	France	Touriste-routier	44	
136	Jean Martinet	Switzerland	Touriste-routier	45	
137	Marcel Huot	France	Touriste-routier	DNF	
138	Eugen Werner	Switzerland	Touriste-routier	DNF	
139	Secundo Martinetto	Italy	Touriste-routier	DNF	
141	Remi Verschaetse	Belgium	Touriste-routier	DNF	
142	Henri Touzard	France	Touriste-routier	37	
144	Albert Barthélémy	France	Touriste-routier	DNF	
145	Henri Simonin	France	Touriste-routier	DNF	
146	Julien Perrain	France	Touriste-routier	DNF	
147	Louis Bajard	Switzerland	Touriste-routier	29	
148	Gaston Persigan	France	Touriste-routier	DNF	
149	Jean Goulème	France	Touriste-routier	26	
150	François Ondet	France	Touriste-routier	28	
152	Marcel Tissier	France	Touriste-routier	47	
153	Lucien Buysse	Belgium	Touriste-routier	DNF	
154	Omer Huyse	Belgium	Touriste-routier	DNF	
155	Ernest Mottard	Belgium	Touriste-routier	DNF	
156	Jérôme Declercq	Belgium	Touriste-routier	DNF	
158	Aurelio Menegazzi	Italy	Touriste-routier	DNF	
166	Fernand Bruynooghe	France	Touriste-routier	DNF	
167	Candida Badal	France	Touriste-routier	DNF	
168	Fernand Robache	France	Touriste-routier	41	
169	Lucien Laval	France	Touriste-routier	35	
171	Lorenzo Fortuno	Italy	Touriste-routier	DNF	
182	André Souchard	France	Touriste-routier	DNF	
184	Raymond Lales	France	Touriste-routier	DNF	
186	Giovanni Roncon	Italy	Touriste-routier	DNF	
