= List of cyclists in the 1929 Tour de France =

List of cyclists

For the 1929 Tour de France, Nicolas Frantz had won the preceding two Tours and was looking for a third. In addition the 1926 Tour winner, Lucien Buysse, was looking for another title.

The entire podium in 1928 was occupied by members from the Alcyon cycling team. The tour organisation wanted the Tour to be an individual race, so in 1929 the teams were not officially recognised, and riders started in the A-category (professional cyclists) or as touriste-routiers (semi-professional or amateur).

== By starting number ==
Legend
No.	Starting number worn by the rider during the Tour
Pos.	Position in the general classification
DNF	Denotes a rider who did not finish

No.	Name	Nationality	Pos.	Ref
1	Nicolas Frantz	Luxembourg	5	
2	Antonin Magne	France	7	
3	Victor Fontan	France	DNF	
4	Ferdinand Le Drogo	France	DNF	
5	Jef Demuysere	Belgium	3	
6	Giuseppe Pancera	Italy	2	
7	Marcel Bidot	France	16	
8	Hector Martin	Belgium	DNF	
9	Jean Aerts	Belgium	DNF	
10	Paul Le Drogo	France	DNF	
11	Pé Verhaegen	Belgium	DNF	
12	Mario Pomposi	Italy	24	
13	André Leducq	France	11	
14	Julien Moineau	France	DNF	
15	Julien Perrain	France	27	
16	Romain Bellenger	France	DNF	
17	Gustaaf Van Slembrouck	Belgium	DNF	
18	Settimo Innocenti	Italy	26	
19	Louis De Lannoy	Belgium	6	
20	Ernest Neuhard	France	20	
21	Salvador Cardona Balbastre	Spain	4	
22	André Godinat	France	DNF	
23	August Verdyck	Belgium	DNF	
24	Charles Rovida	Italy	DNF	
25	Aimé Deolet	Belgium	DNF	
26	Pierre Magne	France	9	
27	Karel Govaert	Belgium	18	
28	Jules Merviel	France	23	
29	Camille Van De Casteele	Belgium	DNF	
30	Alfonso Piccin	Italy	DNF	
31	Maurice De Waele	Belgium	1	
32	Armand Van Bruaene	Belgium	17	
33	Désiré Louesse	Belgium	13	
34	Frans Bonduel	Belgium	12	
35	Lucien Buysse	Belgium	DNF	
36	Alfonso Crippa	Italy	DNF	
37	Julien Vervaecke	Belgium	8	
38	Léon Chene	France	22	
39	Camille Foucaux	France	DNF	
40	Bernard Van Rysselberghe	Belgium	14	
41	Francis Bouillet	France	19	
42	Michele Orecchia	Italy	DNF	
43	Gaston Rebry	Belgium	10	
44	Julien Delbecque	Belgium	DNF	
45	François Henri	France	DNF	
46	Karel Van Hassel	Belgium	DNF	
47	Roger Gregoire	France	30	
48	Michele Mara	Italy	DNF	
49	Charles Pélissier	France	28	
50	Emile Joly	Belgium	DNF	
51	Raymond Decorte	Belgium	DNF	
52	Maurice Geldhof	Belgium	DNF	
53	Aimé Dossche	Belgium	DNF	
102	Giovanni Canova	Italy	DNF	
105	André Philippe	France	DNF	
108	Pierre Maligne	France	DNF	
109	Florimond Guillain	France	DNF	
110	Eugen Werner	Switzerland	51	
111	Henri Touzard	France	39	
112	Charles Garin	France	DNF	
113	Robert Clauws	Belgium	DNF	
114	Edouard Levier	France	DNF	
116	Auguste Sauvage	France	DNF	
117	Léon Joudelat	France	DNF	
118	Adrien Plautin	France	35	
121	Jean Preuss	France	36	
122	Henri Prevost	France	53	
123	Robert Recordon	Switzerland	46	
125	Fernand Comparini	France	DNF	
126	François Van Vlaslaer	France	DNF	
127	Battista Berardi	Italy	49	
128	Giuseppe Pusterla	Italy	DNF	
129	Pierre Charton	France	DNF	
131	Cipriano Monteca	Spain	DNF	
132	François Ondet	France	55	
133	René Picot	France	DNF	
134	Pierre Charmes	France	DNF	
135	Fernand Depraetere	Belgium	DNF	
136	André Pompon	France	DNF	
137	André Léger	France	60	
138	Auguste Encrine	France	33	
139	Victor Pellier	France	DNF	
140	Paul Leger	France	DNF	
141	Ubaldo Merlo	Italy	DNF	
142	Maurice Arnoult	France	DNF	
143	Marcel Ilpide	France	59	
145	Hector Denis	France	31	
146	Guerrino-Angelo Canova	Italy	37	
147	Armand Goubert	France	DNF	
148	Alfred Hersard	France	DNF	
149	Marcel Masson	France	52	
150	Mario Vendruscolo	Italy	DNF	
151	Giuseppe Ercolani	Italy	DNF	
152	Léopold Boisselle	France	42	
153	Edouard Teisseire	France	48	
154	Jean Nirascou	France	DNF	
156	Magnus Matter	Switzerland	DNF	
157	Guido Magnani	Italy	DNF	
158	Marcel Folliot	France	DNF	
160	Marcel Gendrin	France	54	
161	Gino Bartolucci	Italy	DNF	
162	Clovis Cros	France	DNF	
163	Henri Derain	France	DNF	
164	Albert Jordens	Belgium	34	
165	Paul Delbart	France	44	
166	Henri Catelan	France	DNF	
167	Pietro Righetti	Italy	DNF	
168	Roger Lebas	France	40	
170	Jean Zenon	France	DNF	
171	Paul Filliat	France	DNF	
172	Léon Delmulle	France	DNF	
173	Omer Taverne	Belgium	21	
174	Fernand Binet	France	DNF	
175	Guy Bariffi	Switzerland	43	
176	Michele Gordini	Italy	DNF	
178	Antonio Pesenti	Italy	DNF	
179	Sébastien Greau	France	47	
180	André Souchard	France	DNF	
181	René Baudoin	France	DNF	
182	François Moreels	Belgium	38	
183	Georges Petit	France	50	
184	Lorenzo Fortuno	Italy	DNF	
186	Marcel Huot	France	DNF	
187	Charles Martinet	Switzerland	32	
189	Georges Laloup	Belgium	25	
191	Henri Thomas	France	45	
192	Henri Dodane	France	DNF	
193	Paul Denis	France	58	
194	Bernardo Pesce	Italy	DNF	
195	Louis Racko	France	DNF	
198	Mario Della-Fina	Italy	DNF	
201	Georges Dever	France	DNF	
203	Benoît Faure	France	15	
204	Marcel Mazeyrat	France	41	
206	Robert Asse	France	DNF	
207	Jean Benot	France	DNF	
208	Jean Garcia	France	DNF	
209	Charles Cottalorda	France	56	
210	Emile Faillu	France	57	
212	Jean Thilges	France	DNF	
213	François Vidon	France	DNF	
214	Paul Renoux	France	DNF	
215	Eugène Guilbert	France	DNF	
216	Georges Berton	France	29	
218	Henri Simonin	France	DNF	
219	Aristide Drouet	France	DNF	
220	Jean Kienlen	France	DNF	
223	Albert Barthelemy	France	DNF	
225	Pierre Bobo	France	DNF	
227	Bernard Wiber	France	DNF	
230	Rodolphe Delbrassine	France	DNF	
231	Natale Zaninetti	Italy	DNF	
232	Thiébaut Bischene	France	DNF	
239	Etienne Marlot	France	DNF	
241	Constant Meriel	France	DNF	
