= 1930 Tour de France, Stage 1 to Stage 11 =

Cycling race stages

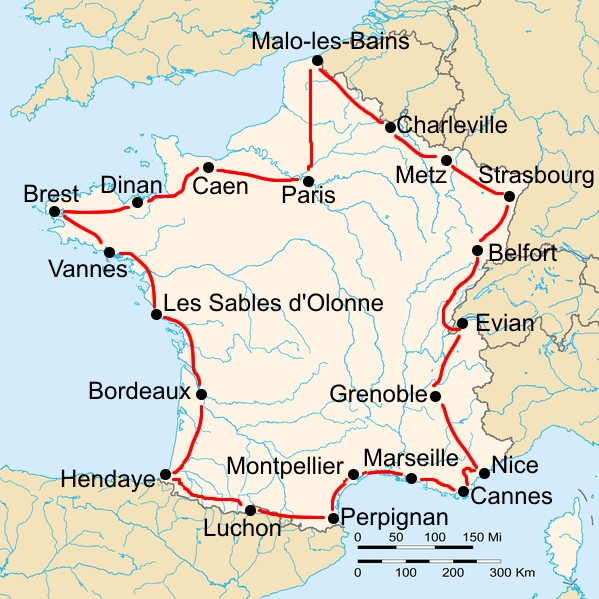
Route of the 1930 Tour de France

The 1930 Tour de France was the 24th edition of the Tour de France, one of cycling's Grand Tours. The Tour began in Paris with a flat stage on 2 July, and Stage 11 occurred on 14 July with a flat stage to Montpellier. The race finished in Paris on 27 July.

== Stage 1 ==
2 July 1930 - Paris to Caen, 206 km (128 mi)

Stage 1 result and general classification after stage 1

Rank	Rider	Team	Time
1	Charles Pélissier (FRA)	France	6h 36' 01"
2	Alfredo Binda (ITA)	Italy	s.t.
3	Aimé Dossche (BEL)	Belgium	+ 1' 16"
4	Jef Demuysere (BEL)	Belgium	s.t.
5	Frans Bonduel (BEL)	Belgium	s.t.
6	Domenico Piemontesi (ITA)	Italy	s.t.
7	Gaetano Belloni (ITA)	Italy	s.t.
8	Learco Guerra (ITA)	Italy	s.t.
9	Giuseppe Pancera (ITA)	Italy	s.t.
10	Leonida Frascarelli (ITA)	Italy	s.t.

== Stage 2 ==
3 July 1930 - Caen to Dinan, 203 km (126 mi)

Stage 2 result

Rank	Rider	Team	Time
1	Learco Guerra (ITA)	Italy	7h 00' 17"
2	Alfredo Binda (ITA)	Italy	+ 1' 28"
3	Charles Pélissier (FRA)	France	s.t.
4	Georges Laloup (BEL)	Belgium	s.t.
5	André Leducq (FRA)	France	s.t.
6	Herbert Nebe (GER)	Germany	s.t.
=7	Jean Aerts (BEL)	Belgium	s.t.
=7	Frans Bonduel (BEL)	Belgium	s.t.
=7	Omer Taverne (BEL)	Belgium	s.t.
=7	Leonida Frascarelli (ITA)	Italy	s.t.

General classification after stage 2

Rank	Rider	Team	Time
1	Learco Guerra (ITA)	Italy	
2	Charles Pélissier (FRA)	France	+ 12"
3	Alfredo Binda (ITA)	Italy	s.t.
4			
5			
6			
7			
8			
9			
10			

== Stage 3 ==
4 July 1930 - Dinan to Brest, 206 km (128 mi)

Stage 3 result

Rank	Rider	Team	Time
1	Charles Pélissier (FRA)	France	6h 39' 18"
2	Alfredo Binda (ITA)	Italy	s.t.
3	Jef Demuysere (BEL)	Belgium	s.t.
4	Omer Taverne (BEL)	Belgium	s.t.
5	Frans Bonduel (BEL)	Belgium	s.t.
6	Albert Barthélémy (FRA)	Touriste-routier	s.t.
7	Adolf Schön (GER)	Germany	s.t.
8	Jean Aerts (BEL)	Belgium	s.t.
=9	Aimé Dossche (BEL)	Belgium	s.t.
=9	Jan Mertens (BEL)	Belgium	s.t.

General classification after stage 3

Rank	Rider	Team	Time
1	Learco Guerra (ITA)	Italy	
2	Charles Pélissier (FRA)	France	+ 12"
3	Alfredo Binda (ITA)	Italy	s.t.
4			
5			
6			
7			
8			
9			
10			

== Stage 4 ==
5 July 1930 - Brest to Vannes, 210 km (130 mi)

Stage 4 result

Rank	Rider	Team	Time
1	Omer Taverne (BEL)	Belgium	6h 56' 03"
2	Charles Pélissier (FRA)	France	s.t.
3	Domenico Piemontesi (ITA)	Italy	s.t.
4	Alfredo Binda (ITA)	Italy	s.t.
5	André Leducq (FRA)	France	s.t.
6	Albert Barthélémy (FRA)	Touriste-routier	s.t.
=7	Jean Aerts (BEL)	Belgium	s.t.
=7	Aimé Dossche (BEL)	Belgium	s.t.
=7	Jan Mertens (BEL)	Belgium	s.t.
=7	Frans Bonduel (BEL)	Belgium	s.t.

General classification after stage 4

Rank	Rider	Team	Time
1	Learco Guerra (ITA)	Italy	
2	Charles Pélissier (FRA)	France	+ 12"
3	Alfredo Binda (ITA)	Italy	s.t.
4			
5			
6			
7			
8			
9			
10			

== Stage 5 ==
6 July 1930 - Vannes to Les Sables d'Olonne, 202 km (126 mi)

Stage 5 result

Rank	Rider	Team	Time
1	André Leducq (FRA)	France	6h 35' 24"
2	Charles Pélissier (FRA)	France	s.t.
3	Alfredo Binda (ITA)	Italy	s.t.
4	Jean Aerts (BEL)	Belgium	s.t.
5	Georges Berton (FRA)	Touriste-routier	s.t.
=6	Aimé Dossche (BEL)	Belgium	s.t.
=6	Jef Demuysere (BEL)	Belgium	s.t.
=6	Jan Mertens (BEL)	Belgium	s.t.
=6	Frans Bonduel (BEL)	Belgium	s.t.
=6	Louis De Lannoy (BEL)	Belgium	s.t.

General classification after stage 5

Rank	Rider	Team	Time
1	Learco Guerra (ITA)	Italy	
2	Charles Pélissier (FRA)	France	+ 12"
3	Alfredo Binda (ITA)	Italy	s.t.
4			
5			
6			
7			
8			
9			
10			

== Stage 6 ==
7 July 1930 - Les Sables d'Olonne to Bordeaux, 285 km (177 mi)

Stage 6 result

Rank	Rider	Team	Time
1	Jean Aerts (BEL)	Belgium	9h 45' 41"
2	Alfredo Binda (ITA)	Italy	s.t.
3	Charles Pélissier (FRA)	France	s.t.
4	André Leducq (FRA)	France	s.t.
5	Jan Mertens (BEL)	Belgium	s.t.
6	Georges Berton (FRA)	Touriste-routier	s.t.
=7	Aimé Dossche (BEL)	Belgium	s.t.
=7	Jef Demuysere (BEL)	Belgium	s.t.
=7	Frans Bonduel (BEL)	Belgium	s.t.
=7	Louis De Lannoy (BEL)	Belgium	s.t.

General classification after stage 6

Rank	Rider	Team	Time
1	Learco Guerra (ITA)	Italy	
2	Charles Pélissier (FRA)	France	+ 12"
3	Alfredo Binda (ITA)	Italy	s.t.
4			
5			
6			
7			
8			
9			
10			

== Stage 7 ==
8 July 1930 - Bordeaux to Hendaye, 222 km (138 mi)

Stage 7 result

Rank	Rider	Team	Time
1	Jules Merviel (FRA)	France	6h 11' 22"
2	Antonin Magne (FRA)	France	+ 2' 24"
3	Charles Pélissier (FRA)	France	+ 2' 28"
4	Learco Guerra (ITA)	Italy	s.t.
5	Jef Demuysere (BEL)	Belgium	s.t.
6	André Leducq (FRA)	France	s.t.
7	Joseph Mauclair (FRA)	France	s.t.
8	Marcel Bidot (FRA)	France	s.t.
9	Frans Bonduel (BEL)	Belgium	+ 8' 31"
10	Hermann Buse (GER)	Germany	s.t.

General classification after stage 7

Rank	Rider	Team	Time
1	Learco Guerra (ITA)	Italy	
2	Charles Pélissier (FRA)	France	+ 12"
3	Antonin Magne (FRA)	France	+ 1' 24"
4			
5			
6			
7			
8			
9			
10			

== Stage 8 ==
9 July 1930 - Hendaye to Pau, 146 km (91 mi)

Stage 8 result

Rank	Rider	Team	Time
1	Alfredo Binda (ITA)	Italy	5h 02' 27"
2	Charles Pélissier (FRA)	France	s.t.
3	Jef Demuysere (BEL)	Belgium	s.t.
4	André Leducq (FRA)	France	s.t.
=5	Jean Aerts (BEL)	Belgium	s.t.
=5	Aimé Dossche (BEL)	Belgium	s.t.
=5	Jan Mertens (BEL)	Belgium	s.t.
=5	Frans Bonduel (BEL)	Belgium	s.t.
=5	Louis De Lannoy (BEL)	Belgium	s.t.
=5	Georges Laloup (BEL)	Belgium	s.t.

General classification after stage 8

Rank	Rider	Team	Time
1	Learco Guerra (ITA)	Italy	
2	Charles Pélissier (FRA)	France	+ 12"
3	Antonin Magne (FRA)	France	+ 1' 24"
4			
5			
6			
7			
8			
9			
10			

== Stage 9 ==
10 July 1930 - Pau to Luchon, 231 km (144 mi)

Stage 9 result

Rank	Rider	Team	Time
1	Alfredo Binda (ITA)	Italy	9h 21' 31"
2	Pierre Magne (FRA)	France	s.t.
3	André Leducq (FRA)	France	s.t.
4	Antonin Magne (FRA)	France	+ 5' 30"
5	Benoît Fauré (FRA)	Touriste-routier	+ 8' 12"
6	Learco Guerra (ITA)	Italy	+ 13' 10"
7	Jef Demuysere (BEL)	Belgium	s.t.
8	Giuseppe Pancera (ITA)	Italy	s.t.
9	Marcel Mazeyrat (FRA)	Touriste-routier	s.t.
10	Fernand Fayolle (FRA)	Touriste-routier	s.t.

General classification after stage 9

Rank	Rider	Team	Time
1	André Leducq (FRA)	France	
2	Antonin Magne (FRA)	France	+ 5' 26"
3	Learco Guerra (ITA)	Italy	+ 11' 42"
4			
5			
6			
7			
8			
9			
10			

== Stage 10 ==
12 July 1930 - Luchon to Perpignan, 322 km (200 mi)

Stage 10 result

Rank	Rider	Team	Time
1	Charles Pélissier (FRA)	France	11h 57' 18"
2	André Leducq (FRA)	France	s.t.
3	Antonin Magne (FRA)	France	s.t.
4	Frans Bonduel (BEL)	Belgium	s.t.
5	Learco Guerra (ITA)	Italy	s.t.
6	Jef Demuysere (BEL)	Belgium	s.t.
7	Lucien Buysse (FRA)	Touriste-routier	s.t.
8	Jean Aerts (BEL)	Belgium	s.t.
9	Marcel Bidot (FRA)	France	s.t.
10	Vicente Trueba (ESP)	Spain	+ 2' 14"

General classification after stage 10

Rank	Rider	Team	Time
1	André Leducq (FRA)	France	
2	Antonin Magne (FRA)	France	+ 5' 26"
3	Learco Guerra (ITA)	Italy	+ 11' 42"
4			
5			
6			
7			
8			
9			
10			

== Stage 11 ==
14 July 1930 - Perpignan to Montpellier, 164 km (102 mi)

Stage 11 result

Rank	Rider	Team	Time
1	Charles Pélissier (FRA)	France	4h 55' 19"
2	Learco Guerra (ITA)	Italy	+ 2' 54"
3	Antonin Magne (FRA)	France	s.t.
4	André Leducq (FRA)	France	s.t.
5	Herbert Nebe (GER)	Germany	s.t.
6	Fernand Robache (FRA)	Touriste-routier	s.t.
7	Lucien Buysse (FRA)	Touriste-routier	s.t.
8	Jef Demuysere (BEL)	Belgium	s.t.
9	Jules Merviel (FRA)	France	+ 6' 29"
10	Alfred Siegel (GER)	Germany	+ 8' 38"

General classification after stage 11

Rank	Rider	Team	Time
1	André Leducq (FRA)	France	
2	Antonin Magne (FRA)	France	+ 5' 26"
3	Learco Guerra (ITA)	Italy	+ 11' 42"
4			
5			
6			
7			
8			
9			
10			
