= 1930 Tour de France, Stage 12 to Stage 21 =

Cycling race stages

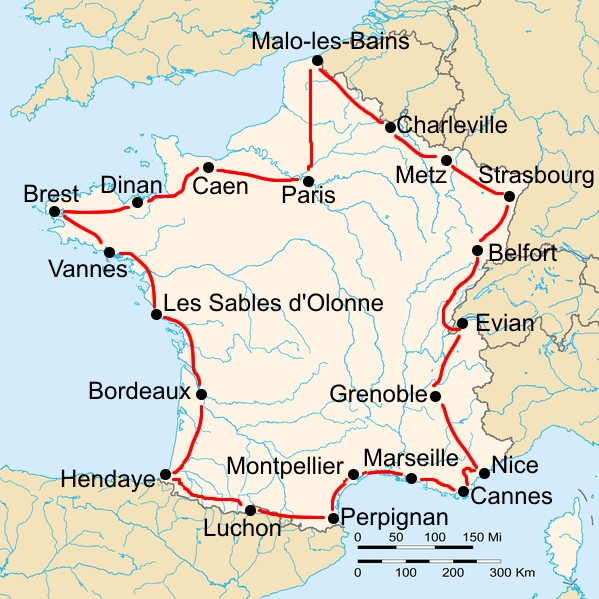
Route of the 1930 Tour de France

The 1930 Tour de France was the 24th edition of the Tour de France, one of cycling's Grand Tours. The Tour began in Paris with a flat stage on 2 July, and Stage 12 occurred on 15 July with a flat stage from Montpellier. The race finished in Paris on 27 July.

== Stage 12 ==
15 July 1930 - Montpellier to Marseille, 209 km (130 mi)

Stage 12 result

Rank	Rider	Team	Time
1	Antonin Magne (FRA)	France	6h 41' 42"
2	Charles Pélissier (FRA)	France	s.t.
3	Omer Taverne (BEL)	Belgium	s.t.
4	André Leducq (FRA)	France	s.t.
5	Jan Mertens (BEL)	Belgium	s.t.
6	Louis Peglion (FRA)	Touriste-routier	s.t.
=7	Jef Demuysere (BEL)	Belgium	s.t.
=7	Frans Bonduel (BEL)	Belgium	s.t.
=7	Louis De Lannoy (BEL)	Belgium	s.t.
=7	Georges Laloup (BEL)	Belgium	s.t.

General classification after stage 12

Rank	Rider	Team	Time
1	André Leducq (FRA)	France	
2	Antonin Magne (FRA)	France	+ 5' 26"
3	Learco Guerra (ITA)	Italy	+ 13' 24"
4			
5			
6			
7			
8			
9			
10			

== Stage 13 ==
16 July 1930 - Marseille to Cannes, 181 km (112 mi)

Stage 13 result

Rank	Rider	Team	Time
1	Learco Guerra (ITA)	Italy	6h 21' 47"
2	Charles Pélissier (FRA)	France	s.t.
3	Frans Bonduel (BEL)	Belgium	s.t.
=4	Aimé Dossche (BEL)	Belgium	s.t.
=4	Jef Demuysere (BEL)	Belgium	s.t.
=4	Jan Mertens (BEL)	Belgium	s.t.
=4	Louis De Lannoy (BEL)	Belgium	s.t.
=4	Omer Taverne (BEL)	Belgium	s.t.
=4	Giuseppe Pancera (ITA)	Italy	s.t.
=4	Marco Giuntelli (ITA)	Italy	s.t.

General classification after stage 13

Rank	Rider	Team	Time
1	André Leducq (FRA)	France	
2	Antonin Magne (FRA)	France	+ 5' 26"
3	Learco Guerra (ITA)	Italy	+ 13' 24"
4			
5			
6			
7			
8			
9			
10			

== Stage 14 ==
17 July 1930 - Cannes to Nice, 132 km (82 mi)

Stage 14 result

Rank	Rider	Team	Time
1	Louis Peglion (FRA)	Touriste-routier	4h 33' 51"
2	André Leducq (FRA)	France	+ 4' 57"
3	Frans Bonduel (BEL)	Belgium	s.t.
4	Oskar Thierbach (GER)	Germany	s.t.
5	Jef Demuysere (BEL)	Belgium	s.t.
6	Benoît Fauré (FRA)	Touriste-routier	s.t.
7	Fernand Fayolle (FRA)	Touriste-routier	s.t.
8	Marcel Bidot (FRA)	France	+ 6' 12"
9	Charles Pélissier (FRA)	France	s.t.
10	Louis De Lannoy (BEL)	Belgium	+ 7' 42"

General classification after stage 14

Rank	Rider	Team	Time
1	André Leducq (FRA)	France	
2	Antonin Magne (FRA)	France	+ 14' 13"
3	Jef Demuysere (BEL)	Belgium	+ 15' 03"
4			
5			
6			
7			
8			
9			
10			

== Stage 15 ==
19 July 1930 - Nice to Grenoble, 333 km (207 mi)

Stage 15 result

Rank	Rider	Team	Time
1	Learco Guerra (ITA)	Italy	13h 48' 58"
2	Benoît Fauré (FRA)	Touriste-routier	s.t.
3	André Leducq (FRA)	France	+ 5' 58"
4	Pierre Magne (FRA)	France	+ 9' 48"
5	Antonin Magne (FRA)	France	s.t.
6	Louis De Lannoy (BEL)	Belgium	s.t.
7	Marcel Bidot (FRA)	France	s.t.
8	Jef Demuysere (BEL)	Belgium	s.t.
9	Louis Peglion (FRA)	Touriste-routier	+ 16' 17"
10	Fernand Fayolle (FRA)	Touriste-routier	s.t.

General classification after stage 15

Rank	Rider	Team	Time
1	André Leducq (FRA)	France	
2	Learco Guerra (ITA)	Italy	+ 16' 13"
3	Antonin Magne (FRA)	France	+ 18' 03"
4			
5			
6			
7			
8			
9			
10			

== Stage 16 ==
21 July 1930 - Grenoble to Evian, 331 km (206 mi)

Stage 16 result

Rank	Rider	Team	Time
1	André Leducq (FRA)	France	13h 39' 23"
2	Charles Pélissier (FRA)	France	s.t.
3	Aimé Dossche (BEL)	Belgium	s.t.
4	Jef Demuysere (BEL)	Belgium	s.t.
=5	Jan Mertens (BEL)	Belgium	s.t.
=5	Frans Bonduel (BEL)	Belgium	s.t.
=5	Louis De Lannoy (BEL)	Belgium	s.t.
=5	Georges Laloup (BEL)	Belgium	s.t.
=5	Learco Guerra (ITA)	Italy	s.t.
=5	Giuseppe Pancera (ITA)	Italy	s.t.

General classification after stage 16

Rank	Rider	Team	Time
1	André Leducq (FRA)	France	
2	Learco Guerra (ITA)	Italy	+ 16' 13"
3	Antonin Magne (FRA)	France	+ 18' 03"
4			
5			
6			
7			
8			
9			
10			

== Stage 17 ==
23 July 1930 - Evian to Belfort, 282 km (175 mi)

Stage 17 result

Rank	Rider	Team	Time
1	Frans Bonduel (BEL)	Belgium	9h 56' 28"
2	Charles Pélissier (FRA)	France	s.t.
3	André Leducq (FRA)	France	s.t.
4	Antonin Magne (FRA)	France	s.t.
5	Learco Guerra (ITA)	Italy	s.t.
=6	Benoît Fauré (FRA)	Touriste-routier	s.t.
=6	Adolf Schön (GER)	Germany	s.t.
=6	Pierre Magne (FRA)	France	s.t.
=6	Vicente Trueba (ESP)	Spain	s.t.
=6	Jules Merviel (FRA)	France	s.t.

General classification after stage 17

Rank	Rider	Team	Time
1	André Leducq (FRA)	France	
2	Learco Guerra (ITA)	Italy	+ 16' 13"
3	Antonin Magne (FRA)	France	+ 18' 03"
4			
5			
6			
7			
8			
9			
10			

== Stage 18 ==
24 July 1930 - Belfort to Metz, 223 km (139 mi)

Stage 18 result

Rank	Rider	Team	Time
1	Charles Pélissier (FRA)	France	8h 27' 43"
2	André Leducq (FRA)	France	s.t.
3	Learco Guerra (ITA)	Italy	s.t.
=4	Jef Demuysere (BEL)	Belgium	s.t.
=4	Aimé Dossche (BEL)	Belgium	s.t.
=4	Frans Bonduel (BEL)	Belgium	s.t.
=4	Louis De Lannoy (BEL)	Belgium	s.t.
=4	Georges Laloup (BEL)	Belgium	s.t.
=4	Omer Taverne (BEL)	Belgium	s.t.
=4	Giuseppe Pancera (ITA)	Italy	s.t.

General classification after stage 18

Rank	Rider	Team	Time
1	André Leducq (FRA)	France	
2	Learco Guerra (ITA)	Italy	+ 16' 13"
3	Antonin Magne (FRA)	France	+ 18' 03"
4			
5			
6			
7			
8			
9			
10			

== Stage 19 ==
25 July 1930 - Metz to Charleville, 159 km (99 mi)

Stage 19 result

Rank	Rider	Team	Time
1	Charles Pélissier (FRA)	France	5h 05' 23"
2	Frans Bonduel (BEL)	Belgium	s.t.
3	Learco Guerra (ITA)	Italy	s.t.
4	Omer Taverne (BEL)	Belgium	s.t.
5	Aimé Dossche (BEL)	Belgium	s.t.
6	Jef Demuysere (BEL)	Belgium	s.t.
7	Jan Mertens (BEL)	Belgium	s.t.
8	Louis De Lannoy (BEL)	Belgium	s.t.
9	Georges Laloup (BEL)	Belgium	s.t.
10	Salvador Cardona (ESP)	Spain	s.t.

General classification after stage 19

Rank	Rider	Team	Time
1	André Leducq (FRA)	France	
2	Learco Guerra (ITA)	Italy	+ 14' 13"
3	Antonin Magne (FRA)	France	+ 16' 03"
4			
5			
6			
7			
8			
9			
10			

== Stage 20 ==
26 July 1930 - Charleville to Malo-les-Bains, 271 km (168 mi)

Stage 20 result

Rank	Rider	Team	Time
1	Charles Pélissier (FRA)	France	10h 05' 10"
2	Frans Bonduel (BEL)	Belgium	s.t.
3	Antonin Magne (FRA)	France	s.t.
4	Learco Guerra (ITA)	Italy	s.t.
=5	Aimé Dossche (BEL)	Belgium	s.t.
=5	Jef Demuysere (BEL)	Belgium	s.t.
=5	Jan Mertens (BEL)	Belgium	s.t.
=5	Louis De Lannoy (BEL)	Belgium	s.t.
=5	Georges Laloup (BEL)	Belgium	s.t.
=5	Omer Taverne (BEL)	Belgium	s.t.

General classification after stage 20

Rank	Rider	Team	Time
1	André Leducq (FRA)	France	
2	Learco Guerra (ITA)	Italy	+ 14' 13"
3	Antonin Magne (FRA)	France	+ 16' 03"
4			
5			
6			
7			
8			
9			
10			

== Stage 21 ==
27 July 1930 - Malo-les-Bains to Paris, 300 km (190 mi)

Stage 21 result

Rank	Rider	Team	Time
1	Charles Pélissier (FRA)	France	12h 10' 09"
2	Learco Guerra (ITA)	Italy	s.t.
3	André Leducq (FRA)	France	s.t.
4	Jules Merviel (FRA)	France	s.t.
5	Omer Taverne (BEL)	Belgium	s.t.
6	Benoît Fauré (FRA)	Touriste-routier	s.t.
=7	François Moreels (FRA)	Touriste-routier	s.t.
=7	Antonin Magne (FRA)	France	s.t.
=7	Pierre Magne (FRA)	France	s.t.
=7	Marco Giuntelli (ITA)	Italy	s.t.

General classification after stage 21

Rank	Rider	Team	Time
1	André Leducq (FRA)	France	172h 12' 16"
2	Learco Guerra (ITA)	Italy	+ 14' 13"
3	Antonin Magne (FRA)	France	+ 16' 03"
4	Jef Demuysere (BEL)	Belgium	+ 21' 34"
5	Marcel Bidot (FRA)	France	+ 41' 18"
6	Pierre Magne (FRA)	France	+ 45' 42"
7	Frans Bonduel (BEL)	Belgium	+ 56' 19"
8	Benoît Fauré (FRA)	Touriste-routier	+ 58' 34"
9	Charles Pélissier (FRA)	France	+ 1h 04' 37"
10	Adolf Schön (GER)	Germany	+ 1h 21' 39"
