= Charton =

Charton is a French surname. Notable people with the surname include:

- Anne Charton-Demeur (1824–1892), French opera singer
- Édouard Charton (1807–1890), French writer, lawyer and politician
- Ernest Charton (1816–1877), French painter
- Jean Charton de Millou (1736–1792), French Jesuit
- Nancy Charton (1920–2015), the first female ordained priest in the Anglican Church of Southern Africa
- Pete Charton (born 1942), American baseball pitcher
- Pierre Charton (1904–1986), French cyclist
