= Fortuño =

Fortuño or Fortuno is a Spanish surname. Notable people with the surname include:

- Luis Fortuño (born 1960), Puerto Rican politician
- Ángel Fortuño (born 2001), Spanish professional footballer
- Luis Fortuño Janeiro (1902–1966), Puerto Rican politician, historian, journalist, and businessman
- Lorenzo Fortuno (1900–unknown), Italian racing cyclist.
