= 1939 Paris–Tours =

Race details
- Dates: 7 May 1939
- Stages: 1
- Distance: 251 km (156.0 mi)
- Winning time: 6h 19' 46"

Results
	Winner	Frans Bonduel (BEL)
	Second	Lucien Storme (BEL)
	Third	Theo Pirmez (BEL)

The 1939 Paris–Tours was the 34th edition of the Paris–Tours cycle race and was held on 7 May 1939. The race started in Paris and finished in Tours. The race was won by Frans Bonduel.

== General classification ==
Final general classification

Rank	Rider	Time
1	Frans Bonduel (BEL)	6h 19' 46"
2	Lucien Storme (BEL)	+ 0"
3	Theo Pirmez (BEL)	+ 0"
4	Achiel Buysse (BEL)	+ 0"
5	Sylvère Maes (BEL)	+ 0"
6	Félicien Vervaecke (BEL)	+ 0"
7	Lucien Lauk (FRA)	+ 0"
8	Albertin Disseaux (BEL)	+ 0"
9	Albert Ritserveldt (BEL)	+ 0"
10	Romain Maes (BEL)	+ 0"
