= Moreels =

Moreels is a surname of Belgian origin. Notable people with the surname include:

- François Moreels (1903–1980), Belgian cyclist
- Maxime Moreels (born 1991), Belgian badminton player
- Sammie Moreels (born 1965), Belgian cyclist
