= Derain (disambiguation) =

Derain may refer to:

- Derain quadrangle, a quadrangle on Mercury
- André Derain (1880–1954), French artist, painter, sculptor and co-founder of Fauvism
  - Derain (crater), a crater on Mercury named after him
- Henri Derain (1902–1960), French racing cyclist
