= Comparini =

Comparini is a surname. Notable people with the surname include:

- Anne-Marie Comparini (1947–2025), French politician
- Fernand Comparini (1896–?), French cyclist
- Giovanni Battista Comparini (died 1616), Roman Catholic prelate, Bishop of Fondi (1591–1616)
