= 1930 Tour of Flanders =

Race details
- Dates: April 14, 1930
- Stages: 1
- Distance: 227 km (141 mi)
- Winning time: 7h 03' 00"

Results
	Winner	Frans Bonduel (BEL)
	Second	Aimé Dossche (BEL)
	Third	Émile Joly (BEL)

The 14th edition of the Tour of Flanders cycling classic race was held on Sunday, 14 April 1930. Belgian Frans Bonduel won the Monument. Of the 92 starting cyclists, 29 reached the finish.

== Route ==
The race started in Ghent and covered 227 km on the way to the finish in Wetteren.

The course featured 4 categorized climbs:

- Tiegemberg
- Kwaremont
- Kruisberg
- Edelareberg

== Race report ==
The final winner was Frans Bonduel, who arrived solo in Wetteren with a huge advantage. Aimé Dossche finished second, while Émile Joly took the third place. Bonduel completed the race with an average of 32.198 km/h.

== General classification ==
=== Final general classification ===
Rank	Rider	Team	Time
1	Frans Bonduel (BEL)	Dilecta-Wolber	7h 03' 00"
2	Aimé Dossche (BEL)	La Nordiste-Wolber	9'15"
3	Émile Joly (BEL)	Génial Lucifer	s.t.
4	Maurice De Waele (BEL)	Alcyon-Dunlop	s.t.
5	Adolf van Bruaene (BEL)	La Nordiste-Wolber	s.t.
6	Alfred Hamerlinck (BEL)	La Nordiste-Wolber	12'55"
7	Hektor van Rossem (BEL)	Alcyon-Dunlop	s.t.
8	Julien Vervaecke (BEL)	Alcyon-Dunlop	13'20"
9	Omer Taverne (BEL)	Oscar Egg-Dunlop	14'45"
10	Frans Alexander (BEL)	Independent	s.t.
