= Jérôme Declercq =

Belgian cyclist

Personal information
- Born: 30 October 1899
- Died: 12 May 1939 (aged 39)

Cycling career
- Sport: Cycling
- Discipline: Road
- Role: Rider

Jérôme Declercq (30 October 1899 – 12 May 1939) was a Belgian racing cyclist. He rode in the 1930 Tour de France.
