= Rudolf Wolke =

German cyclist

Personal information
- Born: 9 June 1906 Berlin, German Empire
- Died: 12 March 1979 (aged 72) West Berlin, West Germany

Cycling career
- Sport: Cycling
- Discipline: Road
- Role: Rider

Rudolf Wolke (9 June 1906 – 12 March 1979) was a German racing cyclist. He rode in the 1930 Tour de France.
