= Gaston Persigan =

French cyclist

Personal information
- Born: 24 April 1893

Cycling career
- Sport: Cycling
- Discipline: Road
- Role: Rider

Gaston Persigan (born 24 April 1893, date of death unknown) was a French racing cyclist. He rode in the 1930 Tour de France.
