= 1934 Milan–San Remo =

Race details
- Dates: 26 March 1934
- Stages: 1
- Distance: 281.5 km (174.9 mi)
- Winning time: 7h 49' 30"

Results
	Winner	Jef Demuysere (BEL)
	Second	Giovanni Cazzulani (ITA)
	Third	Francesco Camusso (ITA)

The 1934 Milan–San Remo was the 27th edition of the Milan–San Remo cycle race and was held on 26 March 1934. The race started in Milan and finished in San Remo. The race was won by Jef Demuysere.

== General classification ==
Final general classification

Rank	Rider	Time
1	Jef Demuysere (BEL)	7h 49' 30"
2	Giovanni Cazzulani (ITA)	+ 1' 40"
3	Francesco Camusso (ITA)	+ 3' 00"
4	Aldo Canazza (ITA)	+ 3' 30"
5	Giuseppe Graglia (LUX)	+ 3' 30"
6	Giuseppe Cassin (ITA)	+ 3' 30"
7	Bernardo Rogora (ITA)	+ 3' 30"
8	Michele Mara (ITA)	+ 3' 30"
9	Carlo Romanatti (ITA)	+ 3' 30"
10	Félicien Vervaecke (BEL)	+ 3' 30"
