= Team classification in the Tour de France =

Tour de France prize

Team classification
- Sport: Road bicycle racing
- Competition: Tour de France
- Awarded for: Best team
- Local name: Classement d'équipes (French)

History
- First award: 1930
- Editions: 90 (as of 2026)
- First winner: France
- Most recent: Lidl–Trek

The team classification is a prize given in the Tour de France to the best team in the race. It has been awarded since 1930, and the calculation has changed throughout the years. There is no coloured jersey for this, but the numbers on the jerseys of the members of the team with the best performance in the general classification at the end of the previous stage are against a yellow background instead of white.

== History ==
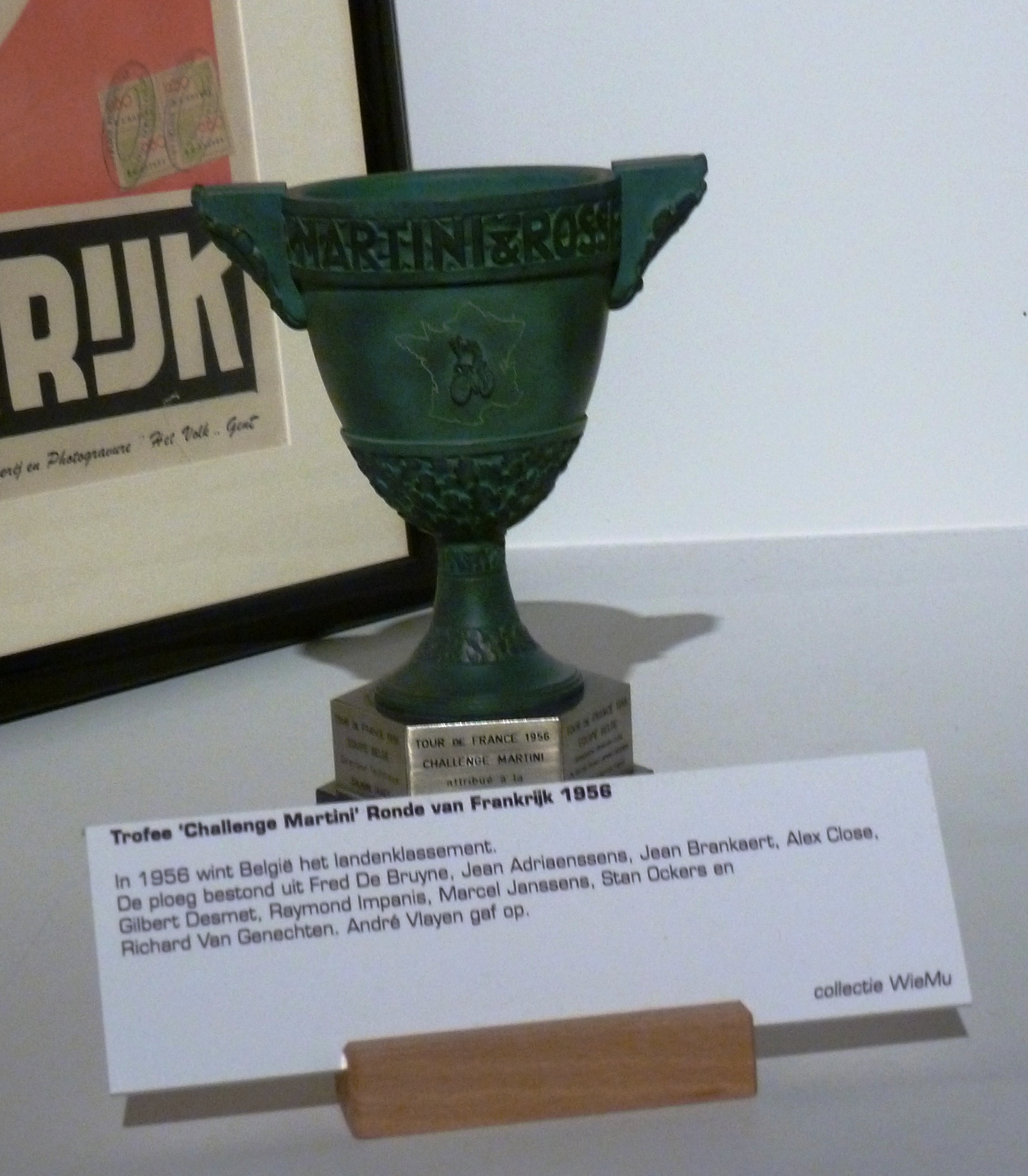
The "Challenge Martini" trophy for 1956, won by the Belgian national team

In the early years of the Tour de France, cyclists entered as individuals. Although they had sponsors, they were not allowed to work as a team, because tour organiser Henri Desgrange wanted the Tour de France to be a display of individual strength. In those years, cyclists could also participate unsponsored. They were categorized under different names; 1909-1914: Isolés; 1919: Categorie B; 1920-1922: 2° Classe; 1923-1926: Touristes-Routiers; 1937: Individuels.

In 1930, Henri Desgrange gave up the idea that cyclist should race individually, and changed the format to real teams. He was still against sponsors assistance, so the cyclists were grouped in countries. This was the situation in the Tours of 1930–1961 and 1967–1968. Between 1962 and 1966 and after 1969, sponsored teams entered the race.

At the introduction of teams in 1930, a prize for the winning team was introduced, then called the Challenge international. In 1930, the classification was calculated by adding the times of the three best cyclists in the general classification.

In 1961, the calculation was changed. The team classification was changed into a points system, where a team received one point for the best team-time in the stage, and the team with the most points was the winner. This system was also used in 1962, but in 1963 the calculation was reverted to the time calculation. In the 1970s, this system was reintroduced as the team points competition, although in a different way: after every stage, all cyclists received points (1 for the winner, 2 for the second, etc.) and these were added, and the team with the fewest points was the winner of the team points classification.

Between 1952 and 1990, the team classification leaders could be recognized by yellow caps, until helmets became mandatory. Since 2006 the best team has worn black on yellow back numbers. Beginning in 2012 the best team was awarded the right, but not the obligation, to wear yellow helmets.

== Status ==
The team classification is considered less important than the individual general classification, and it is rare that a team starts the Tour with the main goal of winning the team classification. If during the race a team is in a good position to win the team classification, the team may change tactics in order to win.

When Lance Armstrong lost hopes of winning in 2010, he instructed his teammates to keep an eye on their main rivals for the team classification, and his Team RadioShack won the team classification.

A good performance in the team classification may help a team to qualify for the next Tour de France. In 2010, a system was set up to determine which teams qualify as UCI ProTeams, and the team classification in the Tour de France was part of this system.

== Calculation ==
As of 2011, the team classification is calculated by adding the times of the three best riders of each team per stage; time bonuses and penalties are ignored. In a team time trial, the team gets the time of the fifth rider of that team to cross the finish, or the last rider if there are fewer than five left for the team. If a team has fewer than three cyclists remaining, it is removed from this classification.

== Winners ==
=== Team classification ===
Team classification winners

Year	Team
1930	France
1931	Belgium
1932	Italy
1933	France
1934	France
1935	Belgium
1936	Belgium
1937	France
1938	Belgium
1939	Belgium B (Note: In some years, countries entered multiple teams. In 1939, Belgium entered two teams and won the team competition with team B. In 1948 and 1950, Belgium won with team A. In 1949, Italy entered two teams and won the team competition with team A.)
1947	Italy
1948	Belgium A
1949	Italy A
1950	Belgium A
1951	France
1952	Italy
1953	Netherlands
1954	Switzerland
1955	France
1956	Belgium

Year	Team
1957	France
1958	Belgium
1959	Belgium
1960	France
1961	France
1962	(France) Saint-Raphaël–Helyett–Hutchinson
1963	(France) Saint-Raphaël–Gitane–R. Geminiani
1964	(France) Pelforth–Sauvage–Lejeune
1965	(Spain) Kas–Kaskol
1966	(Spain) Kas–Kaskol
1967	France
1968	Spain
1969	(Belgium) Faema
1970	(Italy) Salvarani
1971	(France) Bic
1972	(France) Gan–Mercier–Hutchinson
1973	(France) Bic
1974	(Spain) Kas–Kaskol
1975	(France) Gan–Mercier–Hutchinson
1976	(Spain) Kas–Campagnolo

Year	Team
1977	(Netherlands) TI–Raleigh
1978	(France) Miko–Mercier–Vivagel
1979	(France) Renault–Gitane
1980	(France) Miko–Mercier–Vivagel
1981	(France) Peugeot–Esso–Michelin
1982	(France) COOP–Mercier–Mavic
1983	(Netherlands) TI–Raleigh–Campagnolo
1984	(France) Renault–Elf
1985	(France) La Vie Claire
1986	(France) La Vie Claire
1987	(France) Système U
1988	(Netherlands) PDM–Ultima–Concorde
1989	(Netherlands) PDM–Ultima–Concorde
1990	(France) Z–Tomasso
1991	(Spain) Banesto
1992	(Italy) Carrera Jeans–Vagabond
1993	(Italy) Carrera Jeans–Tassoni
1994	(France) Festina–Lotus
1995	(Spain) ONCE
1996	(France) Festina–Lotus

Year	Team
1997	(Germany) Team Telekom
1998	(France) Cofidis
1999	(Spain) Banesto
2000	(Spain) Kelme–Costa Blanca
2001	(Spain) Kelme–Costa Blanca
2002	(Spain) ONCE–Eroski
2003	(Denmark) Team CSC
2004	(Germany) T-Mobile Team
2005	(Germany) T-Mobile Team
2006	(Germany) T-Mobile Team
2007	(United States) Discovery Channel
2008	(Denmark) CSC–Saxo Bank
2009	(Kazakhstan) Astana
2010	(United States) Team RadioShack
2011	(United States) Garmin–Cervélo
2012	(United States) RadioShack–Nissan
2013	(Denmark) Saxo–Tinkoff
2014	(France) Ag2r–La Mondiale
2015	(Spain) Movistar Team
2016	(Spain) Movistar Team

Year	Team
2017	(United Kingdom) Team Sky
2018	(Spain) Movistar Team
2019	(Spain) Movistar Team
2020	(Spain) Movistar Team
2021	Team Bahrain Victorious
2022	(United Kingdom) INEOS Grenadiers
2023	(Netherlands) Team Jumbo–Visma
2024	(United Arab Emirates) UAE Team Emirates
2025	(Netherlands) Visma–Lease a Bike
2026	(Germany) Lidl–Trek

=== Team points classification ===
Between 1973 and 1989, there was an additional team points classification.

Team points classification winners

Year	Team
1973	(France) Gan–Mercier–Hutchinson
1974	(France) Gan–Mercier–Hutchinson
1975	(France) Gan–Mercier–Hutchinson
1976	(France) Gan–Mercier–Hutchinson
1977	(France) Peugeot–Esso–Michelin
1978	(Netherlands) TI–Raleigh–McGregor
1979	(France) Renault–Gitane
1980	(Netherlands) TI–Raleigh–Creda

Year	Team
1981	(France) Peugeot–Esso–Michelin
1982	(Netherlands) TI–Raleigh–Campagnolo
1983	(Netherlands) TI–Raleigh–Campagnolo
1984	(Netherlands) Panasonic–Raleigh
1985	(France) La Vie Claire
1986	(Netherlands) Panasonic–Merckx–Agu
1987	(France) Système U
1988	(Netherlands) PDM–Ultima–Concorde

== See also ==
- Team classification in the Giro d'Italia
- Team classification in the Vuelta a España

== Bibliography ==
- Nauright, John; Parrish, Charles (2012). Sports Around the World: History, Culture, and Practice. Vol. 2. Santa Barbara, CA: ABC-CLIO. ISBN 978-1-59884-300-2.
- van den Akker, Pieter (2018). Tour de France Rules and Statistics: 1903–2018. Self-published. ISBN 978-1-79398-080-9.
