= Jean Goulème =

French cyclist

Personal information
- Born: 3 June 1907
- Died: 4 January 2000 (aged 92)

Cycling career
- Sport: Cycling
- Discipline: Road
- Role: Rider

Jean Goulème (3 June 1907 – 4 January 2000) was a French racing cyclist. He rode in the 1930 Tour de France.
