= Valeriano Riera =

Spanish cyclist (1899–1949)

Personal information
- Born: 15 April 1899
- Died: 16 January 1949 (aged 49)

Cycling career
- Sport: Cycling
- Discipline: Road
- Role: Rider

Valeriano Riera (15 April 1899 – 16 January 1949) was a Spanish racing cyclist. He competed in the 1930 Tour de France.
