= Theo Pirmez =

Belgian cyclist

Personal information
- Born: 13 June 1915
- Died: 9 April 1990 (aged 74)

Cycling career
- Sport: Cycling
- Discipline: Road
- Role: Rider

Theo Pirmez (13 June 1915 – 9 April 1990) was a Belgian racing cyclist. He rode in the 1938 Tour de France.
