= Édouard Levier =

French cyclist

Edouard Levier
Personal information
- Born: 1 April 1896
- Died: 25 November 1976 (aged 80)

Cycling career
- Sport: Cycling
- Discipline: Road
- Role: Rider

Edouard Levier (1 April 1896 – 25 November 1976) was a French racing cyclist. He rode in the 1929 Tour de France.
