= Luis Fortuño Janeiro =

Puerto Rican politician

Luis Nicolás Fortuño Janeiro

Member of the Puerto Rico Senate from the Ponce district
- In office 1937–1944

Personal details
- Born: 6 December 1902 Ponce, Puerto Rico
- Died: 19 June 1966 (aged 63) Ponce, Puerto Rico
- Party: Partido Republicano Puertorriqueño
- Profession: Politician

Luis Nicolás Fortuño Janeiro (6 December 1902 – 19 June 1966) was a politician, historian, journalist, and businessman from Ponce, Puerto Rico. He was senator from Ponce from 1937 to 1941.

== Historian and journalist ==
Fortuño is best remembered for his Album Histórico de Ponce (1692–1963), a photographic record of the city of Ponce and its leaders that covered nearly 300 years of Ponce history. It was his second edition of the book. He owned Imprenta Fortuño (Fortuño Press), a 20th-century icon in southern Puerto Rico's publishing industry. The press shut down in 2015.

== Political career ==
In 1936, he led the strike against the high rates of the Ponce Electric Company. The company was subsequently sold to the Puerto Rican Government's Autoridad de Fuentes Fluviales (now (2019) called "Autoridad de Energía Eléctrica de Puerto Rico"), becoming part of it in 1937. In 1956 Fortuño ran for mayor of Ponce, but lost his bid to Carlos Juan Cintrón.

== Books by Fortuño Janeiro ==
- Album histórico de Ponce, 1692–1963 Ponce, PR: Imprenta Fortuño. 1937. (First edition)
- Laureles póstumos : Antonio R. Barceló. 1939. (co-authored with Ramón Fortuño Sellés)
- Album histórico de Ponce, 1692–1963 Ponce, PR: Imprenta Fortuño. 1963. (Second Edition)

Note: Fay Fowlie-Flores wrote an index to both editions of the Album Histórico tilted "Indice a las dos ediciones del Album histórico de Ponce : 1692–1963."

== Accolades ==
- He is recognized at the Parque del Tricentenario in Ponce, Puerto Rico.
- In 1973, the Municipality of Ponce dedicated its Ponce Carnaval to him.

== Death ==
Fortuño Janeiro died in the hospital in Barrio Cuarto, Ponce, Puerto Rico, on 19 June 1966 due to late stage stomach cancer.
