= Pierre Jouel =

French cyclist

Personal information
- Born: 1904

Cycling career
- Sport: Cycling
- Discipline: Road
- Role: Rider

Pierre Jouel (born 1904, date of death unknown) was a French racing cyclist. He rode in the 1930 Tour de France.
