= Georges Dever =

French cyclist

Personal information
- Born: 24 November 1904
- Died: 3 January 1947 (aged 42)

Cycling career
- Sport: Cycling
- Discipline: Road
- Role: Rider

Georges Dever (24 November 1904 – 3 January 1947) was a French racing cyclist. He rode in the 1929 Tour de France.
