= Thiébaut Bischene =

French cyclist

Personal information
- Born: 22 March 1903
- Died: 6 November 1971 (aged 68)

Cycling career
- Sport: Cycling
- Discipline: Road
- Role: Rider

Thiébaut Bischene (22 March 1903 – 6 November 1971) was a French racing cyclist. He rode in the 1929 Tour de France.
