= Jean Charton de Millou =

French Jesuit

Jean Charton de Millou (1736–1792) was a French Jesuit Catholic priest and martyr, who became a victim of anti-Catholic persecution during the French Revolution.

Charton de Millou joined the Society of Jesus on September 7, 1751. However, his studies were interrupted due to the dissolution of the order, and he continued his education at a diocesan seminary. He completed his philosophical and theological studies, and was ordained as a priest. He then began teaching and also served as a spiritual director to the Sisters of the Sacraments in Paris.

His skills as a preacher and confessor were renowned, and he was credited with numerous conversions among his parishioners. However, his reputation also made him a target of the anti-Catholic sentiment during the French Revolution, leading to his arrest. He steadfastly refused to take the constitutional oath, choosing instead to remain true to his faith. On September 2, 1792, Charton de Millou was murdered in a Carmelite monastery along with 300 other clergy members during the infamous "September Massacres." His death is commemorated in the Catholic Church on the anniversary of his passing.

On October 17, 1926, Charton de Millou was among the 191 martyrs from Paris who were beatified by Pope Pius XI.
