= Paul Leger =

French cyclist

Personal information
- Born: 1 August 1896 Ressons-sur-Matz, France
- Died: 28 July 1942 (aged 45) Ressons-sur-Matz, France

Cycling career
- Sport: Cycling
- Discipline: Road
- Role: Rider

Paul Leger (1 August 1896 – 28 July 1942) was a French racing cyclist. He rode in the 1929 Tour de France.
