= Mario Della-Fina =

Italian cyclist

Personal information
- Born: 17 July 1898

Cycling career
- Sport: Cycling
- Discipline: Road
- Role: Rider

Mario Della-Fina (born 17 July 1898, date of death unknown) was an Italian racing cyclist. He rode in the 1926 Tour de France.
