= Jean Mateu =

Spanish cyclist (1907–1983)

Personal information
- Born: 19 October 1907
- Died: 26 February 1983 (aged 75)

Cycling career
- Sport: Cycling
- Discipline: Road
- Role: Rider

Jean Mateu (19 October 1907 – 26 February 1983) was a Spanish racing cyclist. He rode in the 1930 Tour de France.
