= Émile Joly =

Belgian cyclist

Personal information
- Born: 22 April 1904 Châtelet, Belgium
- Died: 24 February 1980 (aged 75) Montigny-le-Tilleul, Belgium

Cycling career
- Sport: Cycling
- Discipline: Road
- Role: Rider

Amateur team
- 1929: Ideor

Professional teams
- 1929: J.B. Louvet
- 1930-32: Génial Lucifer
- 1933-34: Genial Lucifer-Hutchinson
- 1935-36: Individual

Major wins
- Stage races Tour of Belgium (1928) Tour de l'Ouest (1932)

Émile Joly (22 April 1904 – 24 February 1980) was a Belgian racing cyclist. He rode in the 1929 Tour de France.

== Major results ==
1925
2nd Antwerpen–Menen
1927
6th Liège–Bastogne–Liège
1928
1st Belgian National Road Race Championships, road race (independents)
1st Grand Prix François Faber
1st Stages 1, 3, 6, 7 & 8 Tour of Belgium (independents)
1st Bruxelles-Liège
2nd Bruxelles-Bellaire
2nd Bruxelles-Luxembourg-Mondorf
1929
1st Circuit de Paris
2nd Circuit de Champagne
6th Paris–Roubaix
1930
1st Overall Tour of Belgium

1st Stage 2 and 3

1st Stage 3 Grand Prix du centenaire
1st Circuit de Paris
1st Marseille-Lyon
1st Paris-Fourmies
3rd Circuit du Morbihan
3rd Tour of Flanders
4rd Paris–Roubaix
1931
1st Paris-Rennes
1st Paris-Limoges
1st Paris-Fourmies
1st Overall Antwerpen–Brussel–Antwerpen

1st Stages 1 & 2

2nd National Road Race Championship, road race
5th Paris–Roubaix
7th Tour of Flanders
1932
1st Tour de l'Ouest
3rd Circuit du Morbihan
3rd Paris-Argentan
1933
3rd Circuit de Paris
7th Paris–Tours
1934
3rd Grand Prix de Fourmies
1935
1st Stage 4 Tour of Belgium
