= Florimond Guillain =

French cyclist

Personal information
- Born: 9 February 1903
- Died: 16 June 1993 (aged 90)

Cycling career
- Sport: Cycling
- Discipline: Road
- Role: Rider

Florimond Guillain (9 February 1903 – 16 June 1993) was a French racing cyclist. He rode in the 1927 Tour de France.
