= José Trueba =

Spanish cyclist (1903–1956)

Personal information
- Born: 23 May 1903 Sierrapando, Cantabria, Spain
- Died: 11 November 1956 (aged 53) Santander, Cantabria, Spain

Cycling career
- Sport: Cycling
- Discipline: Road
- Role: Rider

José Trueba (23 May 1903 – 11 November 1956) was a Spanish racing cyclist. He rode in the 1930 Tour de France. His brother Vicente was also a professional cyclist.
