= Felix Manthey =

German cyclist

Personal information
- Born: 24 October 1898 Berlin, Germany
- Died: 8 October 1971 (aged 72) Berlin, Germany

Cycling career
- Sport: Cycling
- Role: Rider

Felix Manthey (24 October 1898 – 8 October 1971) was a German racing cyclist. He won the German National Road Race in 1928. He also rode in the 1930 Tour de France.
