= Louis Bajard =

French cyclist

Personal information
- Born: 2 February 1903
- Died: 12 April 1967 (aged 64)

Cycling career
- Sport: Cycling
- Discipline: Road
- Role: Rider

Louis Bajard (2 February 1903 – 12 April 1967) was a French racing cyclist. He rode in the 1930 Tour de France.
