= François Van Vlaslaer =

French cyclist

Personal information
- Born: 4 April 1897

Cycling career
- Sport: Cycling
- Discipline: Road
- Role: Rider

François Van Vlaslaer (born 4 April 1897, date of death unknown) was a French racing cyclist who rode in the 1929 Tour de France.
