= Saint-Marcellin-en-Forez =

- Commune
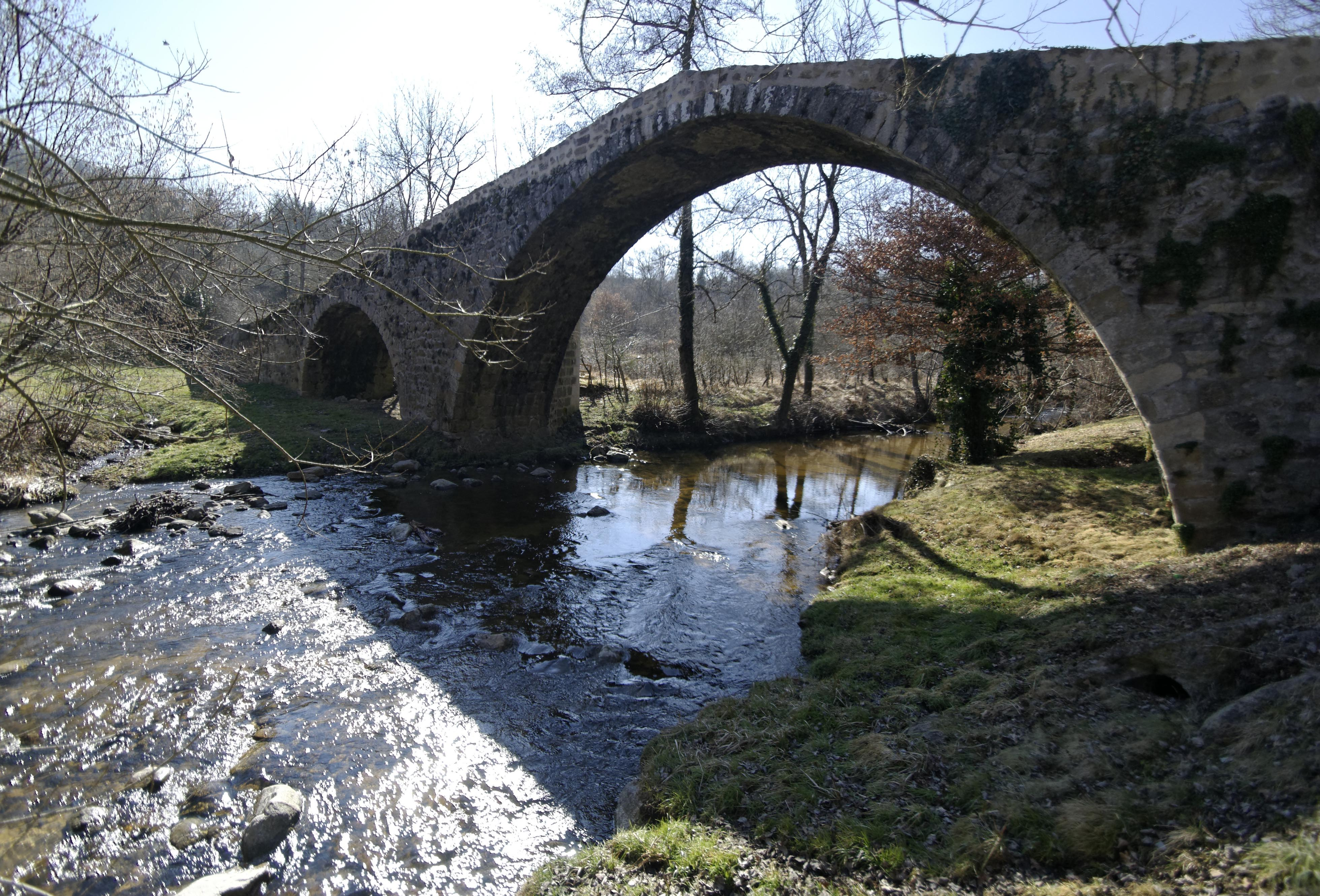
- Bridge at Vérines

- Coat of arms
- Location of Saint-Marcellin-en-Forez
- Location within France Location within Auvergne-Rhône-Alpes
- Coordinates: 45°29′53″N 4°10′05″E
- Country: France
- Region: Auvergne-Rhône-Alpes
- Department: Loire
- Arrondissement: Montbrison
- Canton: Saint-Just-Saint-Rambert
- Intercommunality: CA Loire Forez

Government
  - Mayor (2020–2026): Éric Lardon
- Area^{1}: 31.09 km^{2} (12.00 sq mi)
- Elevation: 407 m (1,335 ft)
- Highest elevation: 640 m (2,100 ft)
- Lowest elevation: 379 m (1,243 ft)
- Population (2023): 5,116
  - Density: 164.6/km^{2} (426.2/sq mi)
- Time zone: UTC+01:00 (CET)
  - Summer (DST): UTC+02:00 (CEST)
- INSEE/Postal code: 42256 /42680
- ^{1} French Land Register data, which excludes lakes, ponds, glaciers > 1 km^{2} (0.386 sq mi or 247 acres) and river estuaries.

Saint-Marcellin-en-Forez (French pronunciation: [sɛ̃ maʁsəlɛ̃ ɑ̃ fɔʁɛ], literally Saint-Marcellin in Forez; Occitan: Sant Marcelin) is a commune in the Loire department in central France.

== History ==
Saint-Marcellin-en-Forez is at an ancient crossroads between Burgundy and Velay, on the highway from the Forez and Montbrison toward the only bridge known in the south of the Loire, which was at Saint-Rambert.

The origins of the city date back to the early Middle Ages. The earliest written reference to the town dates from 984, but a treasure of about 500 4th-century coins (discovered in 1884) indicates an even earlier settlement.

The parish church is mentioned in 1225 and the town's fortifications in 1286. The town is surrounded by a double ring of ramparts of the thirteenth century and the fifteenth century, which gives it a solid appearance. The fortifications are pictured in Guillaume Revel's armorial (1450).

The old town, topped by a high tower, was a defensive structure that withstood repeated assaults. St Marcellin was the stronghold of the Counts of Forez, who had their castle within its walls. It then passed to the Dukes of Bourbon, then was annexed to the kingdom of France without ever having been conquered.

== Population ==
Historical population

Year	Pop.	±% p.a.
1793	1,500	—
1800	1,342	−1.58%
1806	1,649	+3.49%
1821	1,805	+0.60%
1831	1,740	−0.37%
1836	1,824	+0.95%
1841	1,718	−1.19%
1846	1,985	+2.93%
1851	2,018	+0.33%
1856	1,938	−0.81%
1861	2,011	+0.74%
1866	2,000	−0.11%
1872	1,995	−0.04%
1876	1,936	−0.75%
1881	2,017	+0.82%
1886	2,228	+2.01%
1891	1,979	−2.34%
1896	2,050	+0.71%
1901	2,060	+0.10%

Year	Pop.	±% p.a.
1906	1,987	−0.72%
1911	1,994	+0.07%
1921	1,901	−0.48%
1926	1,936	+0.37%
1931	1,868	−0.71%
1936	1,726	−1.57%
1946	1,704	−0.13%
1954	1,807	+0.74%
1962	1,915	+0.73%
1968	2,096	+1.52%
1975	2,312	+1.41%
1982	2,931	+3.45%
1990	3,133	+0.84%
1999	3,373	+0.82%
2007	4,110	+2.50%
2012	4,376	+1.26%
2017	4,848	+2.07%
2023	5,116	+0.90%

Source: EHESS and INSEE (1968-2023)

== Twin towns ==
Saint-Marcellin-en-Forez is twinned with:

- Marta, Lazio, Italy

== See also ==
- Communes of the Loire department
