= Bernard Wiber =

French cyclist

Personal information
- Born: 24 June 1902
- Died: 21 February 1995 (aged 92)

Cycling career
- Sport: Cycling
- Discipline: Road
- Role: Rider

Bernard Wiber (24 June 1902 – 21 February 1995) was a French racing cyclist. He rode in the 1929 Tour de France.
