= Constant Meriel =

French cyclist

Personal information
- Born: 30 April 1907
- Died: 2 July 1976 (aged 69)

Cycling career
- Sport: Cycling
- Discipline: Road
- Role: Rider

Constant Meriel (30 April 1907 – 2 July 1976) was a French racing cyclist. He rode in the 1929 Tour de France.
