= Fernand Moulet =

French cyclist

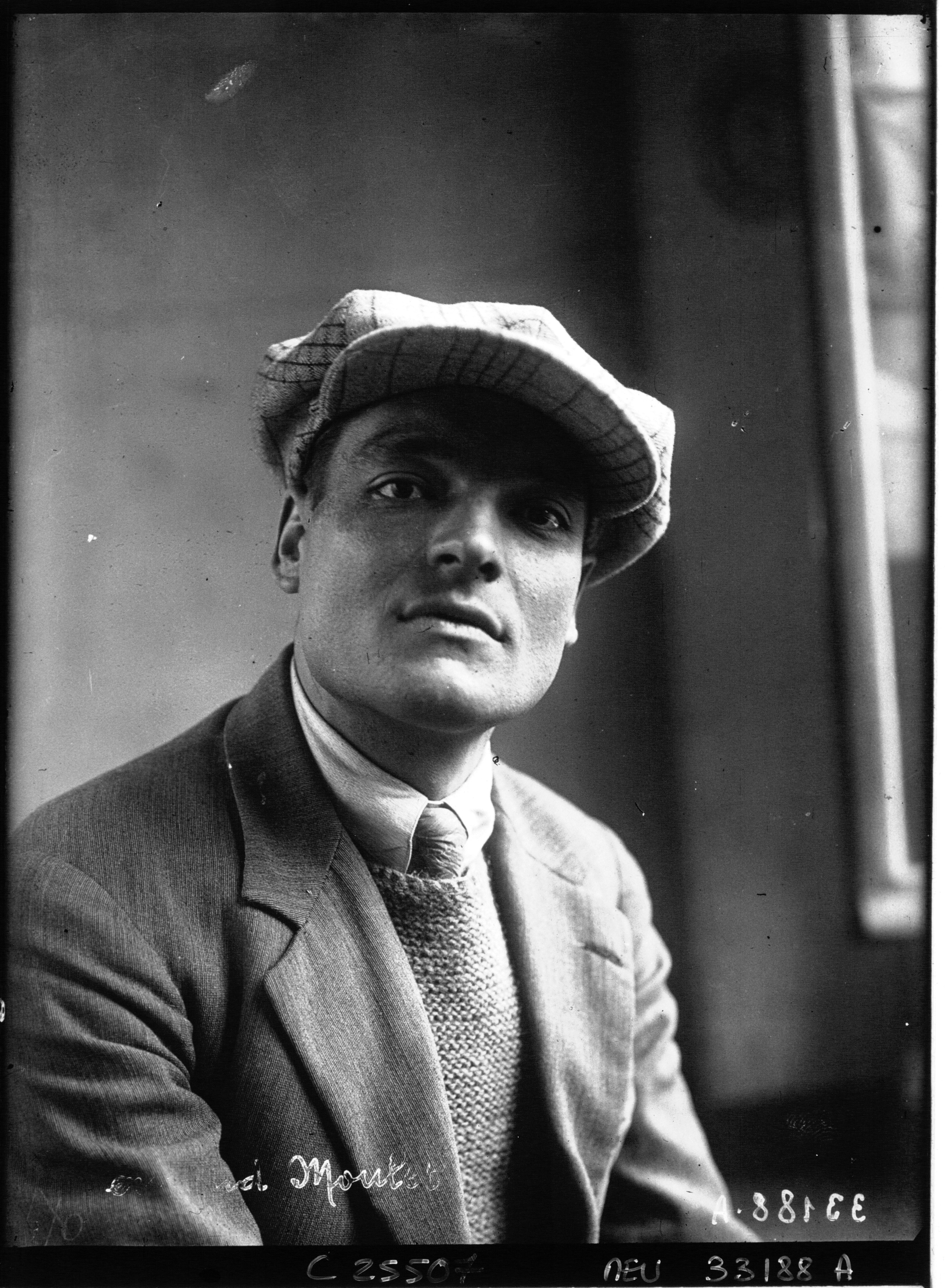

Personal information
- Full name: Fernand Ernest Moulet
- Born: 3 December 1895 Vertus, France
- Died: 25 February 1971 (aged 75) La Loupe, France

Cycling career
- Sport: Cycling
- Role: Rider

Professional teams
- 1921: Delage
- 1922: Individual
- 1923: Labor-Dunlop
- 1924: Individual
- 1926: Météore-Dunlop
- 1927: Météore-Wolber
- 1928-1930: Individual

Fernand Moulet (3 December 1895 – 25 February 1971) was a French racing cyclist. He participated seven times in the Tour de France during the 1920s, but only finished in 1926 and 1928. His older half-brother, Marcel Moulet (1887–1933), also rode as a professional cyclist before World War I.
