= Charles Cento =

French cyclist

Personal information
- Born: 6 August 1893 Casale Monferrato, Kingdom of Italy

Cycling career
- Sport: Cycling
- Role: Rider

Charles Cento (born 6 August 1893, date of death unknown) was a French racing cyclist. He rode in the 1920 Tour de France.
