= Magnus Matter =

Swiss cyclist

Personal information
- Born: 28 April 1898

Cycling career
- Sport: Cycling
- Discipline: Road
- Role: Rider

Magnus Matter (born 28 April 1898, date of death unknown) was a Swiss racing cyclist. He rode in the 1929 Tour de France.
