= Clovis Cros =

French cyclist

Personal information
- Born: 4 May 1904
- Died: 4 June 1969 (aged 65)

Cycling career
- Sport: Cycling
- Discipline: Road
- Role: Rider

Clovis Cros (4 May 1904 – 4 June 1969) was a French racing cyclist. He rode in the 1926 Tour de France.
