= Henri Touzard =

French cyclist

Personal information
- Born: 2 July 1894
- Died: 22 April 1984 (aged 89)

Cycling career
- Sport: Cycling
- Discipline: Road
- Role: Rider

Henri Touzard (2 July 1894 – 22 April 1984) was a French racing cyclist. He rode in seven editions of the Tour de France, from 1923 to 1930.
