= François Ondet =

French cyclist

Personal information
- Born: 2 December 1902
- Died: 2 August 1968 (aged 65)

Cycling career
- Sport: Cycling
- Discipline: Road
- Role: Rider

François Ondet (2 December 1902 – 2 August 1968) was a French racing cyclist. He rode in the 1929 Tour de France.

He also rode in the 1930 Tour de France.
