= Maurice Arnoult =

French cyclist

Personal information
- Born: 30 April 1897
- Died: 25 October 1959 (aged 62)

Cycling career
- Sport: Cycling
- Discipline: Road
- Role: Rider

Maurice Arnoult (30 April 1897 – 25 October 1959) was a French racing cyclist. He rode in the 1923 Tour de France.
