= Marcel Ilpide =

French cyclist

Personal information
- Full name: Marcel Ilpide
- Born: 16 March 1904 Chasseradès, France
- Died: 11 August 1961 (aged 57) Nice, France

Cycling career
- Sport: Cycling
- Role: Rider

Marcel Ilpide (16 March 1904 – 11 August 1961) was a French racing cyclist. He finished in last place in the 1930 Tour de France.
