= Henri Derain =

French cyclist

Personal information
- Born: 27 February 1902
- Died: 21 June 1960 (aged 58)

Cycling career
- Sport: Cycling
- Discipline: Road
- Role: Rider

Henri Derain (27 February 1902 – 21 June 1960) was a French racing cyclist. He rode in the 1929 Tour de France.
