= Marco Giuntelli =

Italian cyclist

Personal information
- Born: 16 March 1905
- Died: 15 April 1964 (aged 59)

Cycling career
- Sport: Cycling
- Discipline: Road
- Role: Rider

Marco Giuntelli (16 March 1905 – 15 April 1964) was an Italian racing cyclist. He rode in the 1930 Tour de France.
