= Alfred Siegel =

German cyclist

Personal information
- Born: 6 February 1903 Place of birth: Breslau (Dolnoslaskie), Germany

Cycling career
- Sport: Cycling
- Discipline: Road
- Role: Rider-Professional Rider: 1929-1935

Alfred Siegel (born 6 February 1903, date of death unknown) was a German racing cyclist. He rode in the 1930 Tour de France.
