= Henri Parol Gottrand =

French cyclist

Personal information
- Born: 15 July 1901
- Died: 22 August 1984 (aged 83)

Cycling career
- Sport: Cycling
- Discipline: Road
- Role: Rider

Henri Parol Gottrand (15 July 1901 – 22 August 1984) was a French racing cyclist. He rode in the 1927 Tour de France.
