= Louis Peglion =

French cyclist

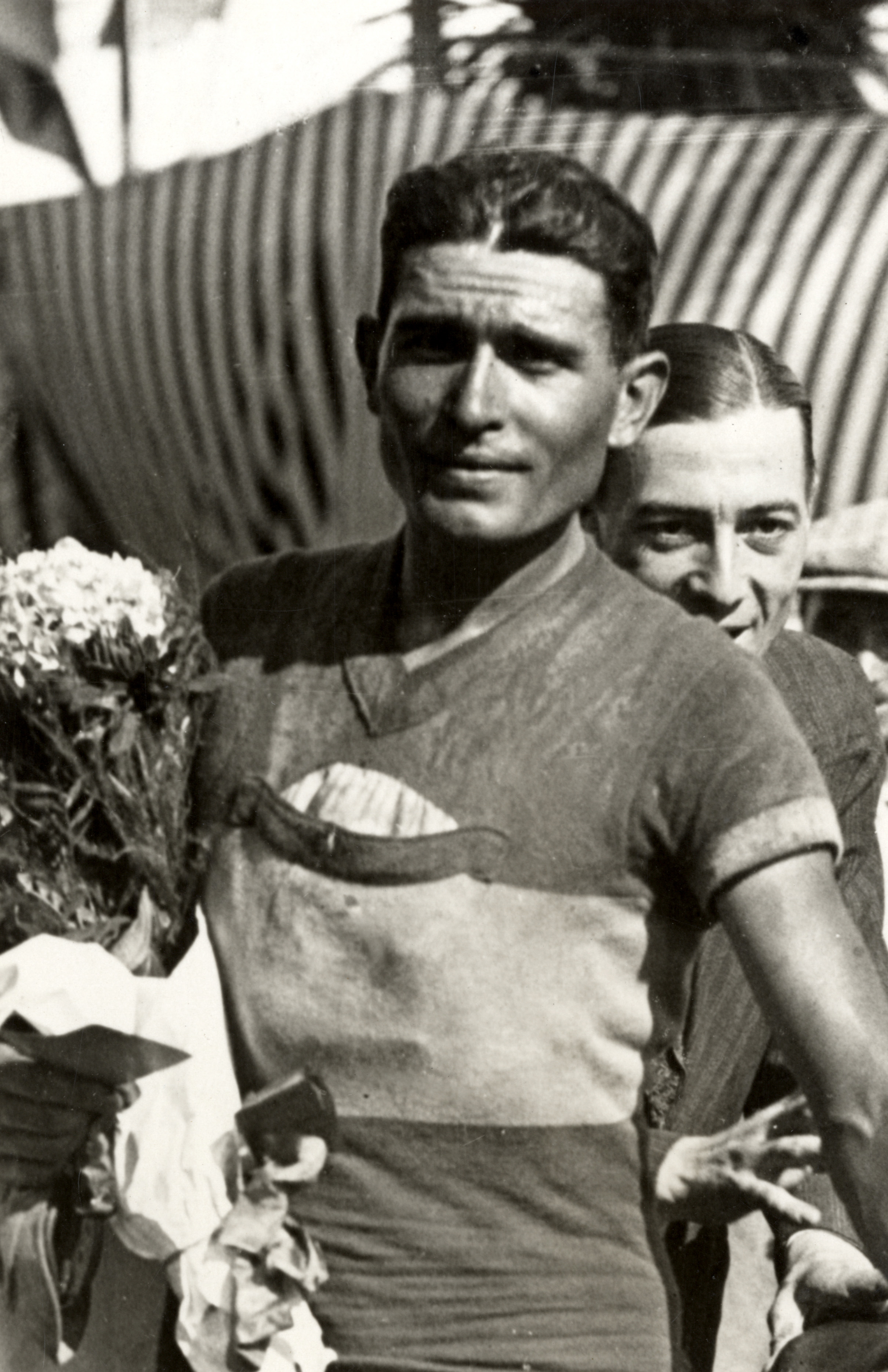

Personal information
- Full name: Louis Peglion
- Born: March 8, 1906 Marseille, France
- Died: August 12, 1986 (aged 80)

Cycling career
- Sport: Cycling
- Discipline: Road
- Role: Rider

Major wins
- One stage 1930 Tour de France

Louis Peglion (8 March 1906 in Marseille – 12 August 1986) was a French professional road bicycle racer, who won one stage in the 1930 Tour de France. He was a touriste-routier in that Tour, which meant that he was not a member of a national team.

== Major results ==
1930
Tour de France:

Winner stage 14

Critèrium de Var
1931
Tour de France:

7th place overall classification
