= Albert Barthélémy =

French cyclist (1906–1988)

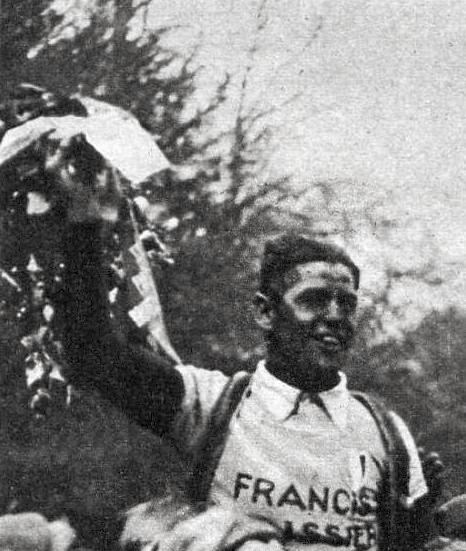

Personal information
- Born: 3 March 1906 Anor, France
- Died: 26 November 1988 (aged 82) Fourmies, France

Cycling career
- Sport: Cycling
- Discipline: Road
- Role: Rider

Albert Barthélémy (3 March 1906 – 26 November 1988) was a French racing cyclist. He rode in three editions of the Tour de France: 1929, 1930 and 1932.

== Major results ==
1928
1st Grand Prix de Fourmies
3rd Paris–Fourmies
1929
1st Grand Prix de Fourmies
1st Paris–Fourmies
2nd Paris-Caen
1930
1st Overall Circuit des Ardennes
1st Grand Prix de Fourmies
2nd Paris–Fourmies
3rd Circuit de Paris
1931
1st Stages 6, 7, 10 & 11 Tour of Germany
3rd Grand Prix de Fourmies
1932
1st Overall Critérium des Aiglons

1st Stages 1 & 2

1st Paris-Rennes
1st Paris-Lille
2nd Grand Prix de Fourmies
1933
1st Paris–Brussels
1934
1st Circuit de la Vallée de l'Aa
