= Lucien Laval =

French cyclist

Personal information
- Born: 1 February 1903
- Died: 21 April 1969 (aged 66)

Cycling career
- Sport: Cycling
- Discipline: Road
- Role: Rider

Lucien Laval (1 February 1903 – 21 April 1969) was a French racing cyclist. He rode in the 1928 Tour de France.
