= Lucien Lange =

French cyclist (1904–1982)

Personal information
- Born: 25 May 1904
- Died: 11 July 1982 (aged 78)

Cycling career
- Sport: Cycling
- Discipline: Road
- Role: Rider

Lucien Lange (25 May 1904 – 11 July 1982) was a French racing cyclist. He rode in the 1928 Tour de France.
