= Fernand Comparini =

French cyclist

Personal information
- Born: 6 December 1896 Brozzi, Trento, Italy
- Died: 15 August 1980 Troyes, Champagne-Ardenne, France

Cycling career
- Sport: Cycling
- Discipline: Road
- Role: Rider

Fernand Comparini (6 December 1896 – 15 August 1980) was a French racing cyclist. He rode in the 1929 Tour de France.
