= Jean Ampurias =

French cyclist (1905–1974)

Personal information
- Born: 10 December 1905 Nice, France
- Died: 20 December 1974 (aged 69) Nice, France

Cycling career
- Sport: Cycling
- Discipline: Road
- Role: Rider

Jean Ampurias (10 December 1905 – 20 December 1974) was a French racing cyclist. He rode in the 1928 Tour de France.
