= Paulin Lanteri =

French cyclist

Personal information
- Born: 22 March 1902
- Died: 19 August 1981 (aged 79)

Cycling career
- Sport: Cycling
- Discipline: Road
- Role: Rider

Paulin Lanteri (22 March 1902 – 19 August 1981) was a French racing cyclist. He rode in the 1928 Tour de France.
