= Ubaldo Merlo =

Italian cyclist

Personal information
- Born: 1 August 1902

Cycling career
- Sport: Cycling
- Discipline: Road
- Role: Rider

Ubaldo Merlo (born 1 August 1902, date of death unknown) was an Italian racing cyclist. He rode in the 1929 Tour de France.
