= Marcel Folliot =

French cyclist

Personal information
- Born: 24 July 1905

Cycling career
- Sport: Cycling
- Discipline: Road
- Role: Rider

Marcel Folliot (born 24 July 1905, date of death unknown) was a French racing cyclist. He rode in the 1928 Tour de France.
