= Jean Martinet (cyclist) =

Swiss cyclist

Personal information
- Born: 2 April 1898
- Died: 29 October 1980 (aged 82)

Cycling career
- Sport: Cycling
- Discipline: Road
- Role: Rider

Jean Martinet (2 April 1898 – 29 October 1980) was a Swiss racing cyclist. He rode in the 1924 Tour de France.
