= Henri Simonin =

French cyclist

Personal information
- Born: 28 August 1905

Cycling career
- Sport: Cycling
- Discipline: Road
- Role: Rider

Henri Simonin (born 28 August 1905, date of death unknown) was a French racing cyclist. He rode in the 1929 Tour de France.
