= Fernand Robache =

French cyclist

Personal information
- Born: 19 November 1899
- Died: 29 December 1978 (aged 79)

Cycling career
- Sport: Cycling
- Discipline: Road
- Role: Rider

Fernand Robache (19 November 1899 – 29 December 1978) was a French racing cyclist. He rode in the 1930 Tour de France.
