= Pierre Charton =

French cyclist (1904–1986)

Personal information
- Born: 14 November 1904
- Died: 1 March 1986 (aged 81)

Cycling career
- Sport: Cycling
- Discipline: Road
- Role: Rider

Pierre Charton (French pronunciation: [pjɛʁ ʃaʁtɔ̃]; 14 November 1904 – 1 March 1986) was a French racing cyclist. He rode in the 1928 Tour de France.
