= Georges Petit (cyclist) =

Belgian cyclist

Personal information
- Born: 1900

Cycling career
- Sport: Cycling
- Discipline: Road
- Role: Rider

Georges Petit (French pronunciation: [ʒɔʁʒ pəti]; born 1900, date of death unknown) was a Belgian racing cyclist. He rode in the 1927 Tour de France.
