= Lorenzo Fortuno =

Italian cyclist

Personal information
- Born: 1900

Cycling career
- Sport: Cycling
- Discipline: Road
- Role: Rider

Lorenzo Fortuno (born 1900, date of death unknown) was an Italian racing cyclist. He rode in the 1927 Tour de France.
