= Pierre Bobo =

French cyclist

Personal information
- Born: 29 November 1902
- Died: 7 July 1971 (aged 68)

Cycling career
- Sport: Cycling
- Discipline: Road
- Role: Rider

Pierre Bobo (29 November 1902 – 7 July 1971) was a French racing cyclist. He rode in the 1929 Tour de France.
