= Marcel Masson =

French cyclist

Personal information
- Born: 18 November 1899
- Died: 9 April 1976 (aged 76)

Cycling career
- Sport: Cycling
- Discipline: Road
- Role: Rider

Marcel Masson (18 November 1899 – 9 April 1976) was a French racing cyclist. He rode in the 1928 Tour de France.
