= Édouard Teisseire =

French cyclist

Personal information
- Born: 27 August 1902
- Died: 28 April 1981 (aged 78)

Cycling career
- Sport: Cycling
- Discipline: Road
- Role: Rider

Édouard Teisseire (27 August 1902 – 28 April 1981) was a French racing cyclist. He rode in the 1925 Tour de France.
