= Henri Prevost =

French cyclist

Personal information
- Born: 6 March 1904
- Died: 4 November 1969 (aged 65)

Cycling career
- Sport: Cycling
- Discipline: Road
- Role: Rider

Henri Prevost (6 March 1904 – 4 November 1969) was a French racing cyclist. He rode in the 1929 Tour de France.
