= Paul Delbart =

French cyclist

Personal information
- Born: 16 July 1901
- Died: 30 April 1958 (aged 56)

Cycling career
- Sport: Cycling
- Discipline: Road
- Role: Rider

Paul Delbart (16 July 1901 – 30 April 1958) was a French racing cyclist. He rode in the 1928 Tour de France.
