= Guy Bariffi =

Swiss cyclist

Personal information
- Born: 4 September 1900
- Died: 28 February 1968 (aged 67)

Cycling career
- Sport: Cycling
- Discipline: Road
- Role: Rider

Guy Bariffi (4 September 1900 – 28 February 1968) was a Swiss racing cyclist. He rode in the 1926 Tour de France.
