= Adrien Plautin =

French cyclist

Personal information
- Born: 5 June 1902
- Died: 31 July 1996 (aged 94)

Cycling career
- Sport: Cycling
- Discipline: Road
- Role: Rider

Adrien Plautin (5 June 1902 – 31 July 1996) was a French racing cyclist. He rode in the 1928 Tour de France.
