= Benoît Faure =

French cyclist

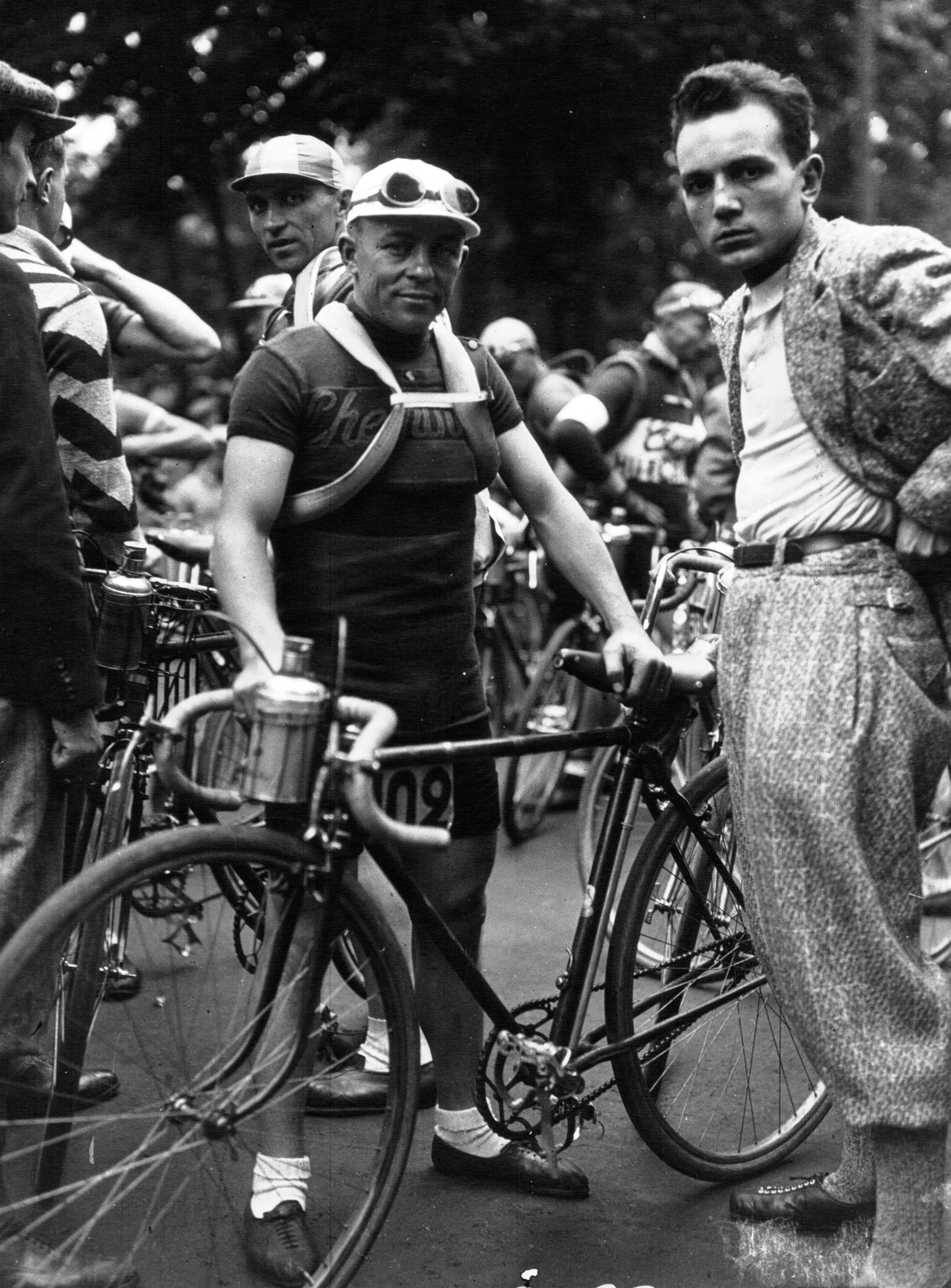
- Benoît Faure in the 1932 Tour de France

Personal information
- Full name: Benoît Faure
- Nickname: La Souris (the mouse)
- Born: 11 January 1899 Saint-Marcellin, France
- Died: 16 June 1980 (aged 81) Montbrison, France

Cycling career
- Sport: Cycling
- Discipline: Road
- Role: Rider

Major wins
- One stage 1930 Tour de France; Critérium International

Benoît Faure (11 January 1899, in Saint-Marcellin – 16 June 1980, in Montbrison) was a French professional road bicycle racer. Benoît Faure was a brother of cyclists Eugène Faure and Francis Faure.

== Major results ==
1927
Circuit du Forez
1929
GP de Thizy
Tour de France:

Winner stage 13

1930
Circuit du Bourbonnais
Lyon-Geneve-Lyon
Tour de France:

8th place overall classification

1932
Paris - Caen
1936
Paris - Nantes
1939
Marseille - Toulon - Marseille
1941
Critérium International
GP d'Espéraza
Coupe Marcel Vergeat
