= Charles Cottalorda =

French cyclist

Personal information
- Born: 11 September 1900
- Died: 3 May 1994 (aged 93)

Cycling career
- Sport: Cycling
- Discipline: Road
- Role: Rider

Charles Cottalorda (11 September 1900 – 3 May 1994) was a French racing cyclist. He rode in the 1929 Tour de France.
