= Léopold Boisselle =

French cyclist

Personal information
- Born: 14 June 1903
- Died: 15 March 1964 (aged 60)

Cycling career
- Sport: Cycling
- Discipline: Road
- Role: Rider

Léopold Boisselle (14 June 1903 – 15 March 1964) was a French racing cyclist. He rode in the 1928 Tour de France.
