= Émile Faillu =

French cyclist

Emile Faillu
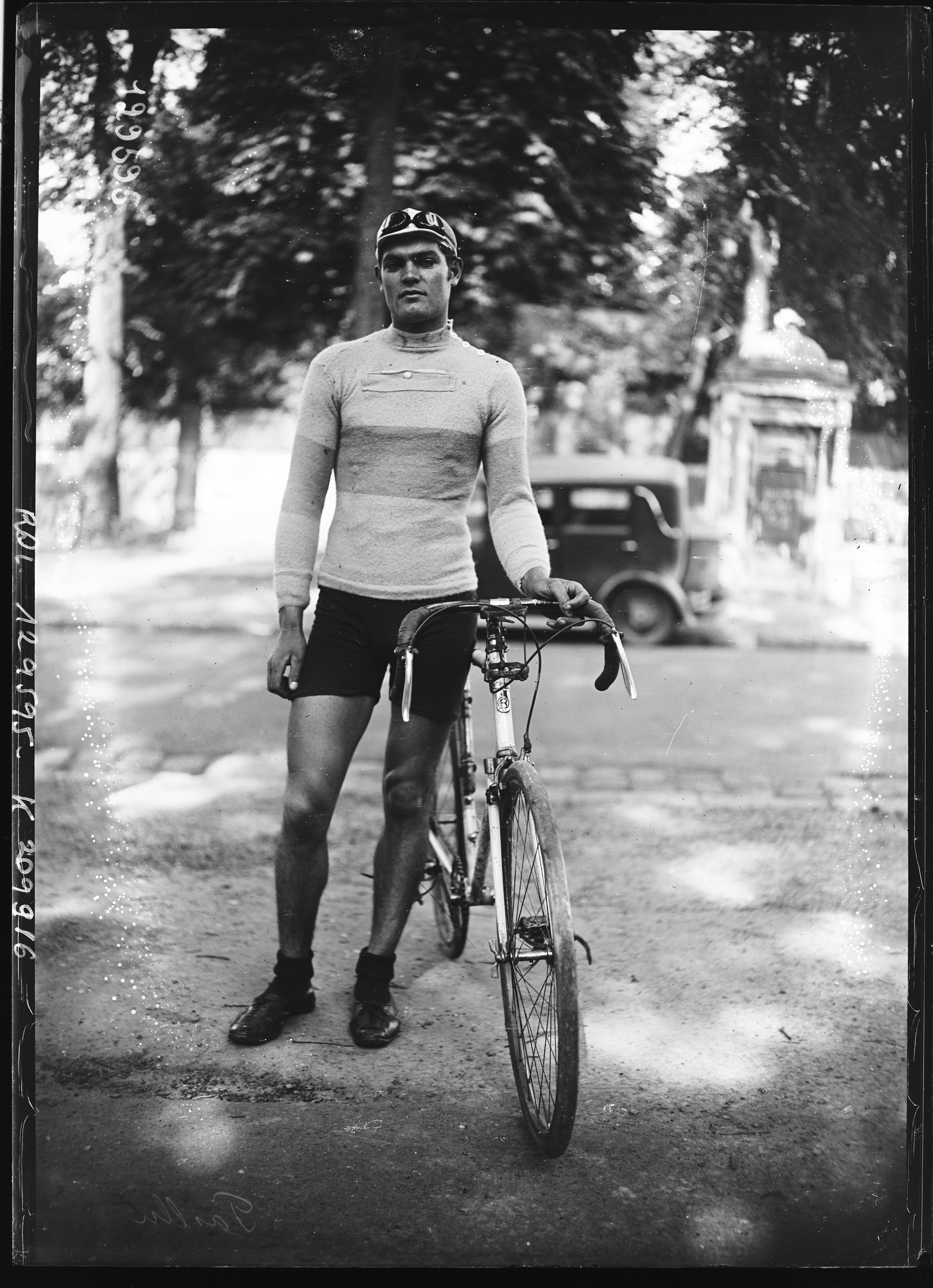

Personal information
- Born: 23 April 1903
- Died: 7 November 1974 (aged 71)

Cycling career
- Sport: Cycling
- Discipline: Road
- Role: Rider

Emile Faillu (23 April 1903 – 7 November 1974) was a French racing cyclist. He rode in the 1927 Tour de France.
