= Battista Berardi =

Italian cyclist

Personal information
- Born: 28 February 1903
- Died: 1968 (aged 64–65)

Cycling career
- Sport: Cycling
- Discipline: Road
- Role: Rider

Battista Berardi (28 February 1903 – 1968) was an Italian racing cyclist. He rode in the 1928 Tour de France.
