= Auguste Encrine =

French cyclist

Personal information
- Born: 21 June 1906 Genoa, Italy

Cycling career
- Sport: Cycling
- Discipline: Road
- Role: Rider

Auguste Encrine (born 21 June 1906, date of death unknown) was an Italian-born French racing cyclist. He rode in the 1929 Tour de France.
