= Georges Berton =

French cyclist

Personal information
- Born: 13 December 1907
- Died: 26 April 2001 (aged 93)

Cycling career
- Sport: Cycling
- Discipline: Road
- Role: Rider

Georges Berton (13 December 1907 – 26 April 2001) was a French racing cyclist. He rode in the 1929 Tour de France.
