= Pierre Magne (cyclist) =

French cyclist (1905–1980)

Personal information
- Full name: Pierre Magne
- Born: 9 November 1905 Livry-Gargan, France
- Died: 14 November 1980 (aged 75) Livry-Gargan, France

Cycling career
- Sport: Cycling
- Discipline: Road
- Role: Rider

Professional teams
- 1927–1930: Alleluia-Wolber
- 1931–1938: France Sport

Major wins
- One stage 1928 Tour de France

Pierre Magne (Livry-Gargan, Seine-Saint-Denis, 9 November 1905 – Livry-Gargan, 14 November 1980) was a French professional road bicycle racer. Magne won one stage in the 1928 Tour de France, and finished 6th in the 1930 Tour de France. Pierre Magne was the younger brother of Tour de France winner Antonin Magne.

== Major results ==
1927
1927 Tour de France:

15th place overall classification

1928
1928 Tour de France:

Winner stage 15
10th place overall classification

1929
1929 Tour de France:

9th place overall classification

Tour de Corrèze
1930
1930 Tour de France:

6th place overall classification

1931
Circuit du Gers
1932
GP de "L'Echo d'Alger"
1933
Circuit de Béarn
Circuit de Cantal
