= Jules Merviel =

French cyclist

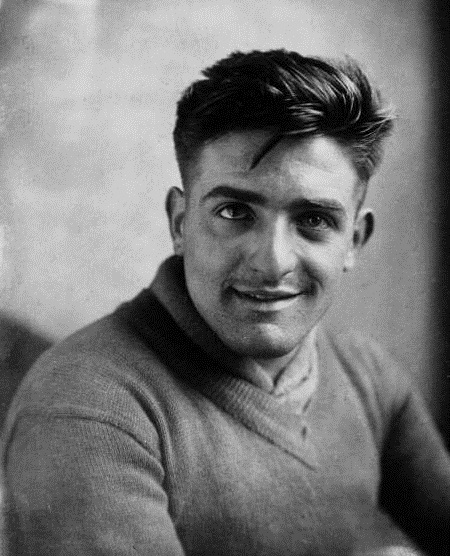

Personal information
- Full name: Jules Merviel
- Born: 29 September 1906 Saint-Beauzély, France
- Died: 1 September 1976 (aged 69) Toulon, France

Cycling career
- Sport: Cycling
- Discipline: Road
- Role: Rider

Major wins
- Paris–Tours (1933); One stage Tour de France (1930)
Medal record
Representing France
Men's road bicycle racing
World Championships
Silver medal – second place	1926 Milan	Amateur's Road Race

Jules Merviel (Saint-Beauzély, 29 September 1906 — Toulon, 1 September 1976) was a French professional road bicycle racer. Merviel won a stage in the 1930 Tour de France. In the 1935 Tour de France, he hit the back of a truck and did not race for two years.

== Major results ==
1929
Paris-Caen
Dreyron
1930
Tour de France:

Winner stage 7

Yverdon
1931
Yverdon
1933
Paris–Tours
24 hours of Montpellier (with Gabriel Marcillac)
1934
Paris-Nevers
Touquet

His name, suitedly, comes from the French word "mervielleux", it means extraordinary or supernatural.
