= Jef Demuysere =

Belgian cyclist

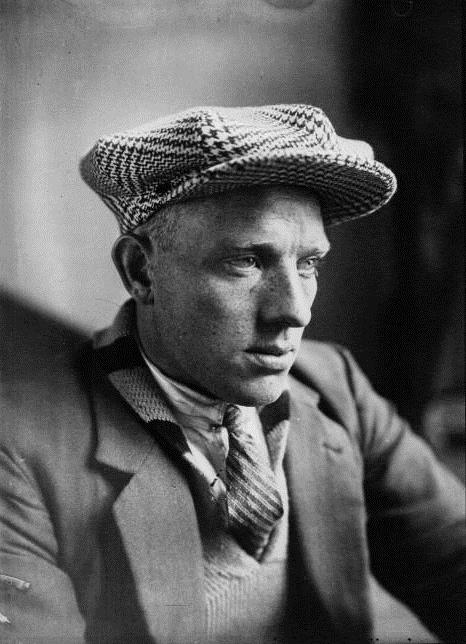
- Demuysere in 1929

Personal information
- Full name: Jef Demuysere
- Nickname: De Vlaamse stier
- Born: 26 July 1907 Wervik, Belgium
- Died: 30 April 1969 (aged 61) Antwerp, Belgium

Cycling career
- Sport: Cycling
- Discipline: Road
- Role: Rider

Major wins
- Milan–San Remo (1934)

Jef Demuysere (Wervik, 26 July 1907 – Antwerp, 30 April 1969) was a Belgian professional road bicycle racer. He won the Milan–San Remo in 1934, and finished on the podium of the Tour de France in 1929 and 1931, and of the Giro d'Italia in 1932 and 1933.

== Major results ==
1926
Paris-Arras
1927
Ronde van Vlaanderen for amateurs
1929
Paris-Longwy
Tour de France:

Winner stage 10
3rd place overall classification

1930
Circuit du Morbihan
Tour de France:

4th place overall classification

1931
Omloop der Vlaamse Gewesten
Tour de France:

Winner stages 15 and 18
2nd place overall classification

1932
(Belgium) Belgian National Cyclo-cross Championships
Giro d'Italia:

2nd place overall classification

Tour de France:

8th place overall classification

1933
Giro d'Italia:

2nd place overall classification

1934
Milan–San Remo
1935
Poperinge

== Trivia ==
- In his native town Wervik, in 2007, special festivities took place to commemorate the cyclist. A statue was inaugurated and a street was baptised with his name.
