= Adolf Schön =

German cyclist

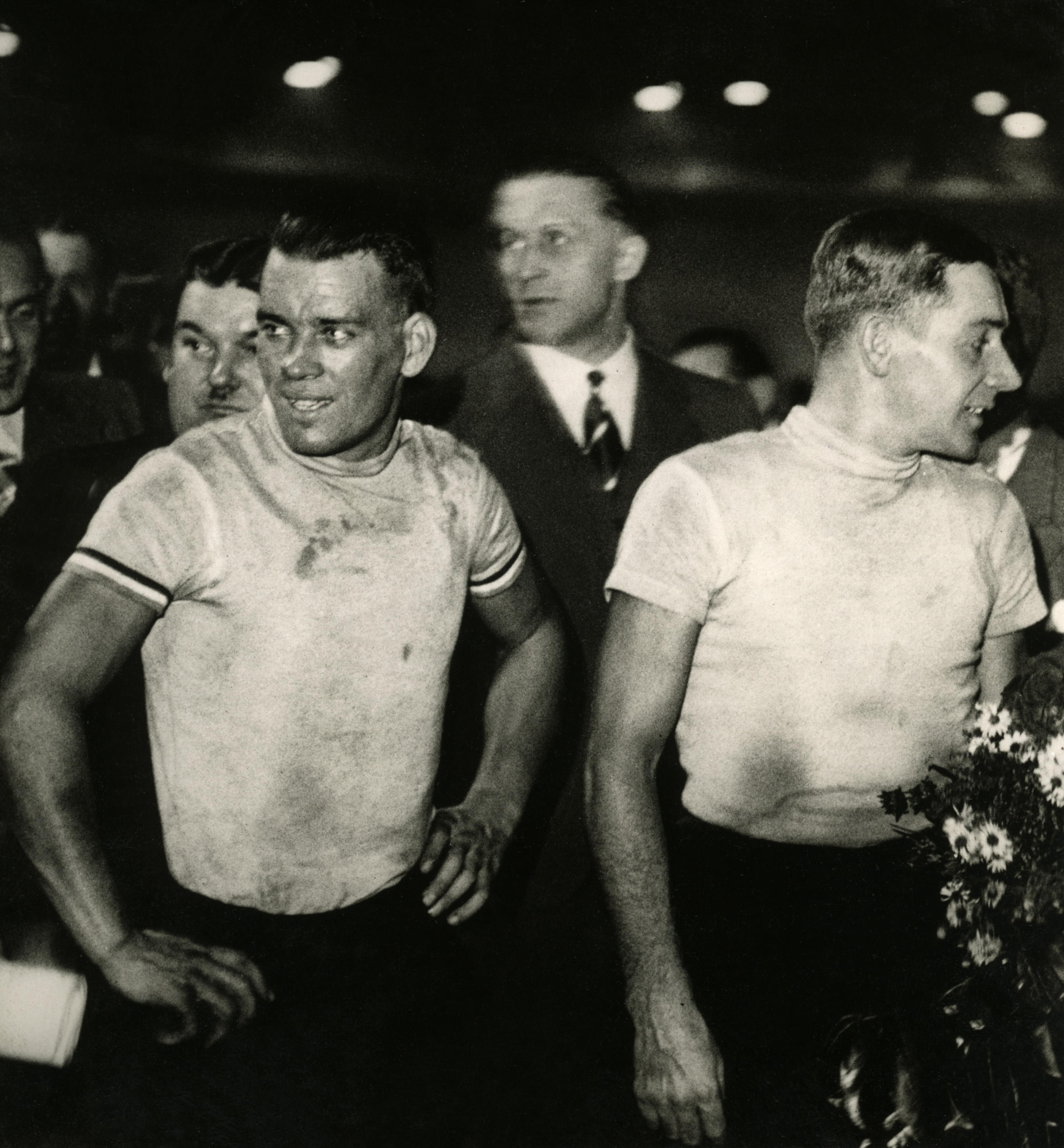
- Adolf Schön (right) with Kees Pellenaars

Personal information
- Born: April 8, 1906 Wiesbaden, Germany
- Died: August 2, 1987 (aged 81) Frankfurt, Germany

Cycling career
- Sport: Cycling
- Discipline: Road
- Role: Rider

Professional team
- 1930: Opel

Adolf Schön (8 April 1906 in Wiesbaden, Germany – 2 August 1987 in Frankfurt) was a German racing cyclist.

== Palmares ==
1930
1st stage 7 Deutschland Tour (TTT)
10th Tour de France
1931
1st Six Days of Berlin (with Jan Pijnenburg)
1st Six Days of Dortmund (with Jan Pijnenburg)
1st Six Days of Cologne (with Karl Göbel)
1st Six Days of Dortmund (with Jan Pijnenburg)
1st Six Days of Berlin 1931 (with Jan Pijnenburg)
1932
1st Six Days of Frankfurt (with Oskar Tietz)
1933
1st Six Days of Brussels (with Jan Pijnenburg)
1st Six Days of Cologne (with Karl Göbel)
1st Six Days of Dortmund (with Paul Buschenhagen)
1937
1st Six Days of Paris (with Kees Pellenaars)
3rd Middle Distance World Championships
