= Marcel Mazeyrat =

French cyclist

Personal information
- Born: 7 October 1906
- Died: 7 March 1980 (aged 73)

Cycling career
- Sport: Cycling
- Discipline: Road
- Role: Rider

Marcel Mazeyrat (7 October 1906 – 7 March 1980) was a French racing cyclist. He rode in the 1929 Tour de France.
