= Charles Pélissier =

French cyclist

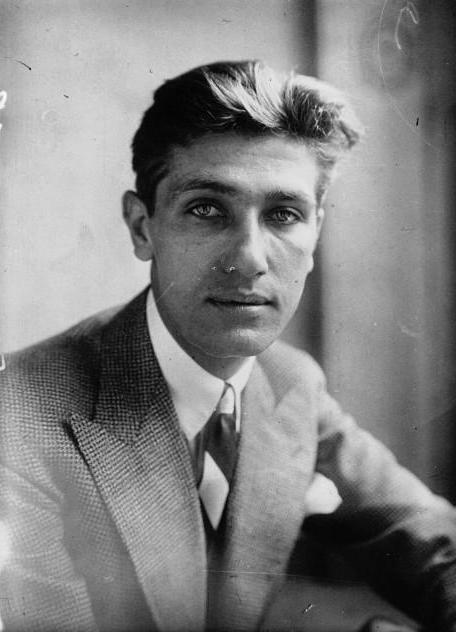

Personal information
- Full name: Charles Pélissier
- Nicknames: Valentino; Brummel
- Born: 20 February 1903 Paris, France
- Died: 28 May 1959 (aged 56) Paris, France

Cycling career
- Sport: Cycling
- Discipline: Road
- Role: Rider
- Rider type: Sprinter

Major wins
- Grand Tours Tour de France 16 individual stages (1929, 1930, 1931, 1935)

Charles Pélissier (20 February 1903 – 28 May 1959) was a French racing cyclist, between 1922 and 1939, winning 16 stages in the Tour de France. The number of eight stages won in the 1930 Tour de France is still a record, shared with Eddy Merckx (1970, 1974) and Freddy Maertens (1976). In addition to his 8-stage wins that year, Pélissier also finished second place 7 times. In the 1931 Tour de France after stage 5, he shared the lead for one day with Rafaele di Paco. Pélissier was the younger brother of racing cyclists Francis Pélissier and Henri Pélissier. Pélissier was born and died in Paris.

== Major results ==
1925
Paris-Arras
1926
France national cyclo-cross champion
1927
France national cyclo-cross champion
Mont-Faron
1928
France national cyclo-cross champion
1929
Tour de France:

Winner stage 16

GP du Mathonnais
1930
Tour de France:

Winner stages 1, 3, 10, 11, 18, 19, 20 and 21 (record on an edition)
9th place overall classification
Wearing yellow jersey for one day

1931
Tour de France:

Winner stages 5, 8, 13, 16 and 24
Wearing yellow jersey for two days (one joint with Rafaele di Paco)

1933
Critérium des As
1934
Circuit de Paris
1935
Tour de France:

Winner stages 2 and 12

1938
Derby de St Germain

== See also ==
- List of doping cases in cycling
