= Frans Bonduel =

Belgian cyclist

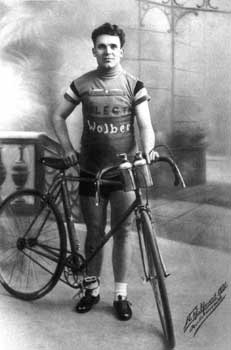

Personal information
- Full name: Frans Bonduel
- Born: 26 September 1907 Baasrode, Belgium
- Died: 25 February 1998 (aged 90) Baasrode, Belgium

Cycling career
- Sport: Cycling
- Discipline: Road
- Role: Rider

Major wins
- Paris–Brussels (1934, 1939); Tour of Flanders (1930); Paris–Tours (1939); Tour de France, 3 stages

Frans Bonduel (26 September 1907 – 25 February 1998) was a Belgian road bicycle racer.

== Major results ==
1929
Criterium du Midi
Omloop van België
Wilrijk
1930
Mere
Paris — Lille
Tour of Flanders
Schaal Sels
Stekene
Wilrijk
Tour de France:

Winner stage 17
7th place overall classification

1931
Circuit du Morbihan
Lokeren
1932
Tour de France:

Winner stages 6 and 7
6th place overall classification

GP St-Michel
GP Stad Sint-Niklaas
1934
Paris–Brussels
1935
Landen
1936
Lochristi
Mons
Waregem
1937
Schaal Sels
1938
Ligny
Sint-Gillis-bij-Dendermonde
1939
Paris–Tours
Paris–Brussels
