= Omer Taverne =

Belgian cyclist

- Omer Taverne during 1924 Brussels–Paris

Personal information
- Born: 27 July 1904 Binche, Belgium
- Died: 10 October 1981 (aged 77) Binche, Belgium

Cycling career
- Sport: Cycling
- Discipline: Road
- Role: Rider

Major wins
- One stage 1929 Tour de France; One stage 1930 Tour de France

Omer Taverne (Binche, 27 July 1904 — Binche, 10 October 1981) was a Belgian professional road bicycle racer, who won two stages in the Tour de France.

== Major results ==
1929
Tour de France:

Winner stage 3

1930
Züri-Metzgete
Tour de France:

Winner stage 4
