= François Moreels =

Belgian cyclist

Personal information
- Born: 25 August 1903
- Died: 8 August 1980 (aged 76)

Cycling career
- Sport: Cycling
- Discipline: Road
- Role: Rider

François Moreels (25 August 1903 – 8 August 1980) was a Belgian racing cyclist. He rode in the 1929 Tour de France.
