= Louis De Lannoy =

Belgian cyclist (1902–1968)

Personal information
- Full name: Louis De Lannoy
- Born: 16 June 1902 Antwerp, Belgium
- Died: 7 February 1968 (aged 65) Antwerp, Belgium

Cycling career
- Sport: Cycling
- Discipline: Road
- Role: Rider

Major wins
- One stage 1929 Tour de France

Louis De Lannoy (16 June 1902 – 7 February 1968) was a Belgian road bicycle racer. In 1929, he won stage 4 of the Tour de France

== Major results ==
1929
Tour de France:

Winner stage 4
6th place overall classification

1926
3rd in Scheldeprijs Vlaanderen
1927
2nd in Stage 4 Tour Of Belgium
1928
2nd in Tour Of Belgium
3rd in Tour Of Flanders
3 in Wilrijk
1929
1st in Circuit De Champagne
3rd in National Championship Cyclo-Cross Elite Belgium
1930
3rd in National Closing Price
1931
2nd in Tour Of Belgium
3rd in Boom
