= Georges Laloup =

Belgian cyclist

Personal information
- Born: 24 May 1903 Amay, Belgium
- Died: 13 March 1979 (aged 75) Huy, Belgium

Cycling career
- Sport: Cycling
- Role: Rider

Georges Laloup (24 May 1903 – 13 March 1979) was a Belgian racing cyclist. He rode in the Tour de France between 1929 and 1931.
