= 1928 Tour de France, Stage 12 to Stage 22 =

Cycling race stages

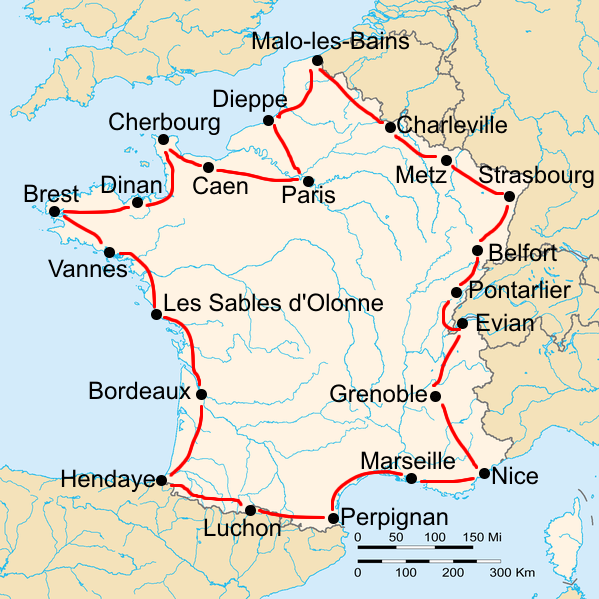
Route of the 1928 Tour de France

The 1928 Tour de France was the 22nd edition of the Tour de France, one of cycling's Grand Tours. The Tour began in Paris with a team time trial on 17 June, and Stage 12 occurred on 2 July with a mountainous stage from Marseille. The race finished in Paris on 15 July.

== Stage 12 ==
2 July 1928 - Marseille to Nice, 330 km (210 mi)

Stage 12 result

Rank	Rider	Team	Time
1	Nicolas Frantz (LUX)	Alcyon-Dunlop	13h 40' 50"
2	André Leducq (FRA)	Alcyon-Dunlop	s.t.
3	Antonin Magne (FRA)	Alleluia-Wolber	s.t.
4	Jan Mertens (BEL)	Thomann-Dunlop	s.t.
5	Camille Van De Casteele (BEL)	JB Louvet-Hutchinson	+ 40"
6	Pierre Magne (FRA)	Alleluia-Wolber	+ 2' 20"
7	Julien Vervaecke (BEL)	Armor-Dunlop	s.t.
8	Jean Bidot (FRA)	Alleluia-Wolber	+ 4' 48"
9	Maurice De Waele (BEL)	Alcyon-Dunlop	s.t.
10	Jean-Baptiste Ampurias (FRA)	Touriste-routier	+ 4' 55"

General classification after stage 12

Rank	Rider	Team	Time
1	Nicolas Frantz (LUX)	Alcyon-Dunlop	
2	Maurice De Waele (BEL)	Alcyon-Dunlop	+ 45' 53"
3	André Leducq (FRA)	Alcyon-Dunlop	+ 1h 01' 59"
4			
5			
6			
7			
8			
9			
10			

== Stage 13 ==
4 July 1928 - Nice to Grenoble, 333 km (207 mi)

Stage 13 result

Rank	Rider	Team	Time
1	Antonin Magne (FRA)	Alleluia-Wolber	14h 00' 36"
2	Nicolas Frantz (LUX)	Alcyon-Dunlop	s.t.
3	Victor Fontan (FRA)	Elvish-Wolber	s.t.
4	André Leducq (FRA)	Alcyon-Dunlop	+ 5' 32"
5	Marcel Bidot (FRA)	Alleluia-Wolber	+ 10' 25"
6	Camille Van De Casteele (BEL)	JB Louvet-Hutchinson	+ 17' 56"
7	Jan Mertens (BEL)	Thomann-Dunlop	s.t.
8	Julien Vervaecke (BEL)	Armor-Dunlop	s.t.
9	Maurice De Waele (BEL)	Alcyon-Dunlop	+ 23' 37"
10	Secondo Martinetto (ITA)	Touriste-routier	s.t.

General classification after stage 13

Rank	Rider	Team	Time
1	Nicolas Frantz (LUX)	Alcyon-Dunlop	
2	André Leducq (FRA)	Alcyon-Dunlop	+ 1h 07' 31"
3	Maurice De Waele (BEL)	Alcyon-Dunlop	+ 1h 09' 30"
4			
5			
6			
7			
8			
9			
10			

== Stage 14 ==
6 July 1928 - Grenoble to Evian, 329 km (204 mi)

Stage 14 result

Rank	Rider	Team	Time
1	Julien Moineau (FRA)	Alleluia-Wolber	12h 35' 32"
2	Camille Van De Casteele (BEL)	JB Louvet-Hutchinson	+ 4' 25"
3	Odile Tailleu (BEL)	JB Louvet-Hutchinson	s.t.
4	Julien Vervaecke (BEL)	Armor-Dunlop	+ 8' 24"
5	Nicolas Frantz (LUX)	Alcyon-Dunlop	s.t.
6	Victor Fontan (FRA)	Elvish-Wolber	s.t.
7	Antonin Magne (FRA)	Alleluia-Wolber	+ 16' 00"
8	André Leducq (FRA)	Alcyon-Dunlop	s.t.
9	Pierre Magne (FRA)	Alleluia-Wolber	s.t.
10	Maurice De Waele (BEL)	Alcyon-Dunlop	+ 26' 17"

General classification after stage 14

Rank	Rider	Team	Time
1	Nicolas Frantz (LUX)	Alcyon-Dunlop	
2	André Leducq (FRA)	Alcyon-Dunlop	+ 1h 15' 07"
3	Maurice De Waele (BEL)	Alcyon-Dunlop	+ 1h 27' 23"
4			
5			
6			
7			
8			
9			
10			

== Stage 15 ==
8 July 1928 - Evian to Pontarlier, 213 km (132 mi) (TTT)

Stage 15 result

Rank	Rider	Team	Time
1	Pierre Magne (FRA)	Alleluia-Wolber	6h 43' 37"
2	Marcel Bidot (FRA)	Alleluia-Wolber	s.t.
3	Julien Moineau (FRA)	Alleluia-Wolber	s.t.
4	Antonin Magne (FRA)	Alleluia-Wolber	s.t.
5	André Leducq (FRA)	Alcyon-Dunlop	+ 5' 51"
6	Nicolas Frantz (LUX)	Alcyon-Dunlop	s.t.
7	Maurice De Waele (BEL)	Alcyon-Dunlop	s.t.
8	Gaston Rebry (BEL)	Alcyon-Dunlop	s.t.
9	Jan Mertens (BEL)	Thomann-Dunlop	s.t.
10	Camille Van De Casteele (BEL)	JB Louvet-Hutchinson	+ 14' 40"

General classification after stage 15

Rank	Rider	Team	Time
1	Nicolas Frantz (LUX)	Alcyon-Dunlop	
2	André Leducq (FRA)	Alcyon-Dunlop	+ 1h 15' 07"
3	Maurice De Waele (BEL)	Alcyon-Dunlop	+ 1h 27' 23"
4			
5			
6			
7			
8			
9			
10			

== Stage 16 ==
9 July 1928 - Pontarlier to Belfort, 119 km (74 mi) (TTT)

Stage 16 result

Rank	Rider	Team	Time
1	André Leducq (FRA)	Alcyon-Dunlop	3h 33' 22"
2	Nicolas Frantz (LUX)	Alcyon-Dunlop	s.t.
3	Jan Mertens (BEL)	Thomann-Dunlop	s.t.
4	Julien Vervaecke (BEL)	Armor-Dunlop	s.t.
5	Maurice De Waele (BEL)	Alcyon-Dunlop	s.t.
6	Joseph Mauclair (FRA)	Armor-Dunlop	+ 46"
7	Gaston Rebry (BEL)	Alcyon-Dunlop	s.t.
8	Louis De Lannoy (BEL)	Armor-Dunlop	s.t.
9	Désiré Louesse (BEL)	Alcyon-Dunlop	+ 1' 03"
10	Antonin Magne (FRA)	Alleluia-Wolber	+ 1' 08"

General classification after stage 16

Rank	Rider	Team	Time
1	Nicolas Frantz (LUX)	Alcyon-Dunlop	
2	André Leducq (FRA)	Alcyon-Dunlop	+ 1h 15' 07"
3	Maurice De Waele (BEL)	Alcyon-Dunlop	+ 1h 27' 23"
4			
5			
6			
7			
8			
9			
10			

== Stage 17 ==
10 July 1928 - Belfort to Strasbourg, 145 km (90 mi) (TTT)

Stage 17 result

Rank	Rider	Team	Time
1	Joseph Mauclair (FRA)	Armor-Dunlop	4h 24' 30"
2	Jan Mertens (BEL)	Thomann-Dunlop	+ 5"
3	Gaston Rebry (BEL)	Alcyon-Dunlop	+ 10"
4	Nicolas Frantz (LUX)	Alcyon-Dunlop	s.t.
5	Maurice De Waele (BEL)	Alcyon-Dunlop	s.t.
6	André Leducq (FRA)	Alcyon-Dunlop	s.t.
7	Julien Vervaecke (BEL)	Armor-Dunlop	s.t.
8	Désiré Louesse (BEL)	Alcyon-Dunlop	s.t.
9	Louis De Lannoy (BEL)	Armor-Dunlop	s.t.
10	Pé Verhaegen (BEL)	JB Louvet-Hutchinson	+ 1' 11"

General classification after stage 17

Rank	Rider	Team	Time
1	Nicolas Frantz (LUX)	Alcyon-Dunlop	
2	André Leducq (FRA)	Alcyon-Dunlop	+ 1h 15' 07"
3	Maurice De Waele (BEL)	Alcyon-Dunlop	+ 1h 27' 23"
4			
5			
6			
7			
8			
9			
10			

== Stage 18 ==
11 July 1928 - Strasbourg to Metz, 165 km (103 mi) (TTT)

Stage 18 result

Rank	Rider	Team	Time
1	Nicolas Frantz (LUX)	Alcyon-Dunlop	4h 59' 19"
2	Jan Mertens (BEL)	Thomann-Dunlop	s.t.
3	Maurice De Waele (BEL)	Alcyon-Dunlop	s.t.
4	André Leducq (FRA)	Alcyon-Dunlop	s.t.
5	Joseph Mauclair (FRA)	Armor-Dunlop	+ 1' 41"
6	Désiré Louesse (BEL)	Alcyon-Dunlop	s.t.
7	Camille Van De Casteele (BEL)	JB Louvet-Hutchinson	+ 4' 48"
8	Julien Vervaecke (BEL)	Armor-Dunlop	+ 7' 52"
9	Pé Verhaegen (BEL)	JB Louvet-Hutchinson	+ 9' 34"
10	Odile Tailleu (BEL)	JB Louvet-Hutchinson	+ 10' 55"

General classification after stage 18

Rank	Rider	Team	Time
1	Nicolas Frantz (LUX)	Alcyon-Dunlop	
2	André Leducq (FRA)	Alcyon-Dunlop	+ 1h 15' 07"
3	Maurice De Waele (BEL)	Alcyon-Dunlop	+ 1h 27' 23"
4			
5			
6			
7			
8			
9			
10			

== Stage 19 ==
12 July 1928 - Metz to Charleville, 159 km (99 mi) (TTT)

Stage 19 result

Rank	Rider	Team	Time
1	Marcel Huot (FRA)	Alleluia-Wolber	4h 36' 15"
2	Julien Moineau (FRA)	Alleluia-Wolber	s.t.
3	Pierre Magne (FRA)	Alleluia-Wolber	s.t.
4	Marcel Bidot (FRA)	Alleluia-Wolber	s.t.
5	Antonin Magne (FRA)	Alleluia-Wolber	s.t.
6	Pé Verhaegen (BEL)	JB Louvet-Hutchinson	+ 9' 38"
7	André Leducq (FRA)	Alcyon-Dunlop	+ 10' 15"
8	Victor Fontan (FRA)	Elvish-Wolber	+ 12' 02"
9	Jean Mouveroux (FRA)	Fontan-Wolber	s.t.
10	Salvador Cardona Balbastre (ESP)	Elvish-Wolber	s.t.

General classification after stage 19

Rank	Rider	Team	Time
1	Nicolas Frantz (LUX)	Alcyon-Dunlop	
2	André Leducq (FRA)	Alcyon-Dunlop	+ 47' 31"
3	Maurice De Waele (BEL)	Alcyon-Dunlop	+ 1h 03' 18"
4			
5			
6			
7			
8			
9			
10			

== Stage 20 ==
13 July 1928 - Charleville to Malo-les-Bains, 271 km (168 mi) (TTT)

Stage 20 result

Rank	Rider	Team	Time
1	Maurice De Waele (BEL)	Alcyon-Dunlop	8h 47' 31"
2	Jan Mertens (BEL)	Thomann-Dunlop	+ 2' 01"
3	Nicolas Frantz (LUX)	Alcyon-Dunlop	+ 9' 38"
4	André Leducq (FRA)	Alcyon-Dunlop	s.t.
5	Louis De Lannoy (BEL)	Armor-Dunlop	+ 30' 01"
6	Gaston Rebry (BEL)	Alcyon-Dunlop	s.t.
7	Antonin Magne (FRA)	Alleluia-Wolber	+ 31' 03"
8	Julien Vervaecke (BEL)	Armor-Dunlop	+ 33' 04"
9	Marcel Huot (FRA)	Alleluia-Wolber	+ 33' 14"
10	Odile Tailleu (BEL)	JB Louvet-Hutchinson	+ 38' 14"

General classification after stage 20

Rank	Rider	Team	Time
1	Nicolas Frantz (LUX)	Alcyon-Dunlop	
2	André Leducq (FRA)	Alcyon-Dunlop	+ 47' 31"
3	Maurice De Waele (BEL)	Alcyon-Dunlop	+ 53' 40"
4			
5			
6			
7			
8			
9			
10			

== Stage 21 ==
14 July 1928 - Malo-les-Bains to Dieppe, 234 km (145 mi) (TTT)

Stage 21 result

Rank	Rider	Team	Time
1	Antonin Magne (FRA)	Alleluia-Wolber	7h 43' 33"
2	Joseph Mauclair (FRA)	Armor-Dunlop	+ 10' 00"
3	Jan Mertens (BEL)	Thomann-Dunlop	s.t.
4	André Leducq (FRA)	Alcyon-Dunlop	s.t.
5	Désiré Louesse (BEL)	Alcyon-Dunlop	s.t.
6	Nicolas Frantz (LUX)	Alcyon-Dunlop	s.t.
7	Maurice De Waele (BEL)	Alcyon-Dunlop	s.t.
8	Julien Vervaecke (BEL)	Armor-Dunlop	+ 10' 18"
9	Gaston Rebry (BEL)	Alcyon-Dunlop	+ 18' 28"
10	Victor Fontan (FRA)	Elvish-Wolber	+ 20' 00"

General classification after stage 21

Rank	Rider	Team	Time
1	Nicolas Frantz (LUX)	Alcyon-Dunlop	
2	André Leducq (FRA)	Alcyon-Dunlop	+ 47' 31"
3	Maurice De Waele (BEL)	Alcyon-Dunlop	+ 53' 40"
4			
5			
6			
7			
8			
9			
10			

== Stage 22 ==
15 July 1928 - Dieppe to Paris, 331 km (206 mi)

Stage 22 result

Rank	Rider	Team	Time
1	Nicolas Frantz (LUX)	Alcyon-Dunlop	13h 35' 02"
2	Jean Bidot (FRA)	Alleluia-Wolber	s.t.
3	Pierre Magne (FRA)	Alleluia-Wolber	s.t.
4	Jan Mertens (BEL)	Thomann-Dunlop	s.t.
5	Antonin Magne (FRA)	Alleluia-Wolber	s.t.
6	Marcel Bidot (FRA)	Alleluia-Wolber	s.t.
7	Louis De Lannoy (BEL)	Armor-Dunlop	s.t.
8	Julien Moineau (FRA)	Alleluia-Wolber	s.t.
9	Hubert Opperman (AUS)	Ravat-Wonder-Dunlop	s.t.
10	Odile Tailleu (BEL)	JB Louvet-Hutchinson	s.t.

General classification after stage 22

Rank	Rider	Team	Time
1	Nicolas Frantz (LUX)	Alcyon-Dunlop	192h 48' 58"
2	André Leducq (FRA)	Alcyon-Dunlop	+ 50' 07"
3	Maurice De Waele (BEL)	Alcyon-Dunlop	+ 56' 16"
4	Jan Mertens (BEL)	Thomann-Dunlop	+ 1h 19' 18"
5	Julien Vervaecke (BEL)	Armor-Dunlop	+ 1h 53' 32"
6	Antonin Magne (FRA)	Alleluia-Wolber	+ 2h 14' 02"
7	Victor Fontan (FRA)	Elvish-Wolber	+ 5h 07' 47"
8	Marcel Bidot (FRA)	Alleluia-Wolber	+ 5h 18' 28"
9	Marcel Huot (FRA)	Alleluia-Wolber	+ 5h 37' 33"
10	Pierre Magne (FRA)	Alleluia-Wolber	+ 5h 41' 20"
