= 1928 Tour de France, Stage 1 to Stage 11 =

Cycling race stages

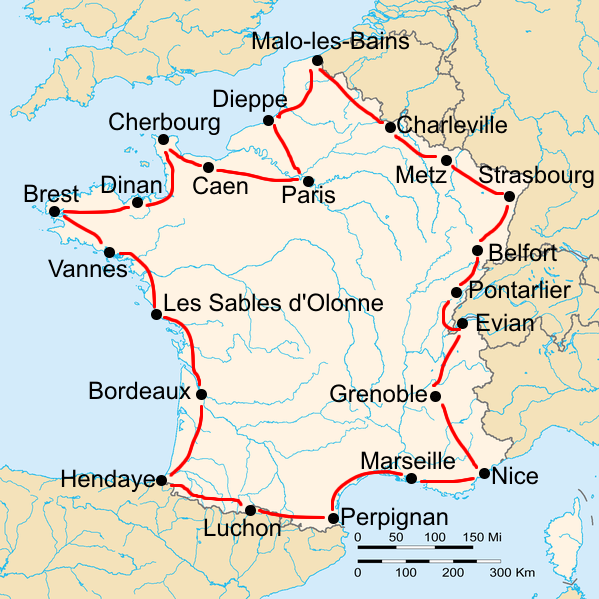
Route of the 1928 Tour de France

The 1928 Tour de France was the 22nd edition of the Tour de France, one of cycling's Grand Tours. The Tour began in Paris with a team time trial on 17 June, and Stage 11 occurred on 30 June with a flat stage to Marseille. The race finished in Paris on 15 July.

== Stage 1 ==
17 June 1928 - Paris to Caen, 207 km (129 mi) (TTT)

Stage 1 result and general classification after stage 1

Rank	Rider	Team	Time
1	Nicolas Frantz (LUX)	Alcyon-Dunlop	6h 29' 03"
2	Jan Mertens (BEL)	Thomann-Dunlop	s.t.
3	Gaston Rebry (BEL)	Alcyon-Dunlop	s.t.
4	Maurice De Waele (BEL)	Alcyon-Dunlop	s.t.
5	Julien Vervaecke (BEL)	Armor-Dunlop	s.t.
6	André Leducq (FRA)	Alcyon-Dunlop	+ 10' 56"
7	Joseph Mauclair (FRA)	Armor-Dunlop	+ 14' 38"
8	Marcel Bidot (FRA)	Alleluia-Wolber	+ 16' 57"
9	Pierre Magne (FRA)	Alleluia-Wolber	s.t.
10	Jean Bidot (FRA)	Alleluia-Wolber	s.t.

== Stage 2 ==
18 June 1928 - Caen to Cherbourg-en-Cotentin, 140 km (87 mi) (TTT)

Stage 2 result

Rank	Rider	Team	Time
1	André Leducq (FRA)	Alcyon-Dunlop	4h 12' 29"
2	Nicolas Frantz (LUX)	Alcyon-Dunlop	s.t.
3	Jan Mertens (BEL)	Thomann-Dunlop	s.t.
4	Gaston Rebry (BEL)	Alcyon-Dunlop	s.t.
5	Julien Vervaecke (BEL)	Armor-Dunlop	s.t.
6	Maurice De Waele (BEL)	Alcyon-Dunlop	s.t.
7	Louis De Lannoy (BEL)	Armor-Dunlop	s.t.
8	Marcel Bidot (FRA)	Alleluia-Wolber	s.t.
9	Arsène Alancourt (FRA)	Alleluia-Wolber	s.t.
10	Marcel Huot (FRA)	Alleluia-Wolber	s.t.

General classification after stage 2

Rank	Rider	Team	Time
=1	Nicolas Frantz (LUX)	Alcyon-Dunlop	
=1	Jan Mertens (BEL)	Thomann-Dunlop	s.t.
=1	Gaston Rebry (BEL)	Alcyon-Dunlop	s.t.
=1	Maurice De Waele (BEL)	Alcyon-Dunlop	s.t.
=1	Julien Vervaecke (BEL)	Armor-Dunlop	s.t.
6			
7			
8			
9			
10			

== Stage 3 ==
19 June 1928 - Cherbourg-en-Cotentin to Dinan, 199 km (124 mi) (TTT)

Stage 3 result

Rank	Rider	Team	Time
1	Gaston Rebry (BEL)	Alcyon-Dunlop	6h 29' 17"
2	Nicolas Frantz (LUX)	Alcyon-Dunlop	s.t.
3	Maurice De Waele (BEL)	Alcyon-Dunlop	+ 1' 14"
4	Julien Vervaecke (BEL)	Armor-Dunlop	+ 2' 15"
5	André Leducq (FRA)	Alcyon-Dunlop	+ 3' 10"
6	Pé Verhaegen (BEL)	JB Louvet-Hutchinson	+ 3' 21"
7	Harry Watson (NZL)	Ravat-Wonder-Dunlop	+ 9' 51"
8	Hubert Opperman (AUS)	Ravat-Wonder-Dunlop	s.t.
9	Percy Osborn (AUS)	Ravat-Wonder-Dunlop	s.t.
10	Camille Van De Casteele (BEL)	JB Louvet-Hutchinson	+ 13' 57"

General classification after stage 3

Rank	Rider	Team	Time
=1	Nicolas Frantz (LUX)	Alcyon-Dunlop	
=1	Gaston Rebry (BEL)	Alcyon-Dunlop	s.t.
3	Maurice De Waele (BEL)	Alcyon-Dunlop	+ 1' 14"
4			
5			
6			
7			
8			
9			
10			

== Stage 4 ==
20 June 1928 - Dinan to Brest, 206 km (128 mi) (TTT)

Stage 4 result

Rank	Rider	Team	Time
1	Pé Verhaegen (BEL)	JB Louvet-Hutchinson	6h 47' 58"
2	Camille Van De Casteele (BEL)	JB Louvet-Hutchinson	s.t.
3	Nicolas Frantz (LUX)	Alcyon-Dunlop	+ 2' 25"
4	Julien Vervaecke (BEL)	Armor-Dunlop	s.t.
5	Jan Mertens (BEL)	Thomann-Dunlop	s.t.
6	André Leducq (FRA)	Alcyon-Dunlop	s.t.
7	Louis De Lannoy (BEL)	Armor-Dunlop	s.t.
8	Désiré Louesse (BEL)	Alcyon-Dunlop	s.t.
9	Maurice De Waele (BEL)	Alcyon-Dunlop	s.t.
10	Gaston Rebry (BEL)	Alcyon-Dunlop	s.t.

General classification after stage 4

Rank	Rider	Team	Time
=1	Nicolas Frantz (LUX)	Alcyon-Dunlop	
=1	Gaston Rebry (BEL)	Alcyon-Dunlop	s.t.
3	Maurice De Waele (BEL)	Alcyon-Dunlop	+ 1' 14"
4			
5			
6			
7			
8			
9			
10			

== Stage 5 ==
21 June 1928 - Brest to Vannes, 208 km (129 mi) (TTT)

Stage 5 result

Rank	Rider	Team	Time
1	Marcel Bidot (FRA)	Alleluia-Wolber	6h 43' 36"
2	Antonin Magne (FRA)	Alleluia-Wolber	s.t.
3	Louis De Lannoy (BEL)	Armor-Dunlop	+ 4' 40"
4	Nicolas Frantz (LUX)	Alcyon-Dunlop	s.t.
5	Maurice De Waele (BEL)	Alcyon-Dunlop	s.t.
6	André Leducq (FRA)	Alcyon-Dunlop	s.t.
7	Julien Vervaecke (BEL)	Armor-Dunlop	s.t.
8	Gaston Rebry (BEL)	Alcyon-Dunlop	s.t.
9	Joseph Mauclair (FRA)	Armor-Dunlop	+ 7' 02"
10	Hubert Opperman (AUS)	Ravat-Wonder-Dunlop	+ 11' 59"

General classification after stage 5

Rank	Rider	Team	Time
=1	Nicolas Frantz (LUX)	Alcyon-Dunlop	
=1	Gaston Rebry (BEL)	Alcyon-Dunlop	s.t.
3	Maurice De Waele (BEL)	Alcyon-Dunlop	+ 1' 14"
4			
5			
6			
7			
8			
9			
10			

== Stage 6 ==
22 June 1928 - Vannes to Les Sables d'Olonne, 204 km (127 mi) (TTT)

Stage 6 result

Rank	Rider	Team	Time
1	Nicolas Frantz (LUX)	Alcyon-Dunlop	6h 23' 44"
2	André Leducq (FRA)	Alcyon-Dunlop	s.t.
3	Jan Mertens (BEL)	Thomann-Dunlop	s.t.
4	Gaston Rebry (BEL)	Alcyon-Dunlop	s.t.
5	Ernest Neuhard (FRA)	Alcyon-Dunlop	s.t.
6	Julien Vervaecke (BEL)	Armor-Dunlop	s.t.
7	Joseph Mauclair (FRA)	Armor-Dunlop	s.t.
8	Maurice De Waele (BEL)	Alcyon-Dunlop	+ 25"
9	Pé Verhaegen (BEL)	JB Louvet-Hutchinson	+ 3' 46"
10	Raymond Decorte (BEL)	JB Louvet-Hutchinson	+ 8' 04"

General classification after stage 6

Rank	Rider	Team	Time
=1	Nicolas Frantz (LUX)	Alcyon-Dunlop	
=1	Gaston Rebry (BEL)	Alcyon-Dunlop	s.t.
3	Maurice De Waele (BEL)	Alcyon-Dunlop	+ 1' 39"
4			
5			
6			
7			
8			
9			
10			

== Stage 7 ==
23 June 1928 - Les Sables d'Olonne to Bordeaux, 285 km (177 mi) (TTT)

Stage 7 result

Rank	Rider	Team	Time
1	Victor Fontan (FRA)	Elvish-Wolber	9h 21' 33"
2	Salvador Cardona Balbastre (ESP)	Elvish-Wolber	s.t.
3	Antonin Magne (FRA)	Alleluia-Wolber	+ 3' 42"
4	Francis Bouillet (FRA)	Alleluia-Wolber	s.t.
5	Marcel Huot (FRA)	Alleluia-Wolber	s.t.
6	Maurice De Waele (BEL)	Alcyon-Dunlop	+ 4' 42"
7	Jan Mertens (BEL)	Thomann-Dunlop	s.t.
8	Nicolas Frantz (LUX)	Alcyon-Dunlop	s.t.
9	André Leducq (FRA)	Alcyon-Dunlop	s.t.
10	Julien Vervaecke (BEL)	Armor-Dunlop	s.t.

General classification after stage 7

Rank	Rider	Team	Time
1	Nicolas Frantz (LUX)	Alcyon-Dunlop	
2	Maurice De Waele (BEL)	Alcyon-Dunlop	+ 1' 39"
3	Julien Vervaecke (BEL)	Armor-Dunlop	+ 2' 15"
4			
5			
6			
7			
8			
9			
10			

== Stage 8 ==
24 June 1928 - Bordeaux to Hendaye, 225 km (140 mi) (TTT)

Stage 8 result

Rank	Rider	Team	Time
1	Maurice De Waele (BEL)	Alcyon-Dunlop	6h 47' 25"
2	André Leducq (FRA)	Alcyon-Dunlop	s.t.
3	Julien Vervaecke (BEL)	Armor-Dunlop	s.t.
4	Nicolas Frantz (LUX)	Alcyon-Dunlop	s.t.
5	Gaston Rebry (BEL)	Alcyon-Dunlop	s.t.
6	Louis De Lannoy (BEL)	Armor-Dunlop	s.t.
7	Jan Mertens (BEL)	Thomann-Dunlop	s.t.
8	Joseph Mauclair (FRA)	Alcyon-Dunlop	+ 3' 45"
9	Hubert Opperman (AUS)	Ravat-Wonder-Dunlop	+ 4' 33"
10	Harry Watson (NZL)	Ravat-Wonder-Dunlop	s.t.

General classification after stage 8

Rank	Rider	Team	Time
1	Nicolas Frantz (LUX)	Alcyon-Dunlop	
2	Maurice De Waele (BEL)	Alcyon-Dunlop	+ 1' 39"
3	Julien Vervaecke (BEL)	Armor-Dunlop	+ 2' 15"
4			
5			
6			
7			
8			
9			
10			

== Stage 9 ==
26 June 1928 - Hendaye to Luchon, 387 km (240 mi)

Stage 9 result

Rank	Rider	Team	Time
1	Victor Fontan (FRA)	Elvish-Wolber	16h 13' 10"
2	Nicolas Frantz (LUX)	Alcyon-Dunlop	+ 7' 44"
3	Camille Van De Casteele (BEL)	JB Louvet-Hutchinson	+ 13' 24"
4	Jan Mertens (BEL)	Thomann-Dunlop	+ 32' 01"
5	Louis De Lannoy (BEL)	Armor-Dunlop	+ 36' 35"
6	Marcel Huot (FRA)	Alleluia-Wolber	+ 46' 26"
7	Maurice De Waele (BEL)	Alcyon-Dunlop	+ 47' 10"
8	Pierre Magne (FRA)	Alleluia-Wolber	+ 48' 23"
9	André Leducq (FRA)	Alcyon-Dunlop	+ 55' 37"
10	Antonin Magne (FRA)	Alleluia-Wolber	+ 56' 20"

General classification after stage 9

Rank	Rider	Team	Time
1	Nicolas Frantz (LUX)	Alcyon-Dunlop	
2	Maurice De Waele (BEL)	Alcyon-Dunlop	+ 41' 05"
3	Jan Mertens (BEL)	Thomann-Dunlop	+ 54' 12"
4			
5			
6			
7			
8			
9			
10			

== Stage 10 ==
28 June 1928 - Luchon to Perpignan, 323 km (201 mi)

Stage 10 result

Rank	Rider	Team	Time
1	André Leducq (FRA)	Alcyon-Dunlop	12h 27' 22"
2	Nicolas Frantz (LUX)	Alcyon-Dunlop	s.t.
3	Maurice De Waele (BEL)	Alcyon-Dunlop	s.t.
4	Antonin Magne (FRA)	Alleluia-Wolber	+ 9' 24"
5	Jan Mertens (BEL)	Thomann-Dunlop	s.t.
6	Julien Vervaecke (BEL)	Armor-Dunlop	s.t.
7	Victor Fontan (FRA)	Elvish-Wolber	s.t.
8	Marcel Bidot (FRA)	Alleluia-Wolber	s.t.
9	Pierre Magne (FRA)	Alleluia-Wolber	+ 17' 57"
10	Pé Verhaegen (BEL)	JB Louvet-Hutchinson	+ 24' 42"

General classification after stage 10

Rank	Rider	Team	Time
1	Nicolas Frantz (LUX)	Alcyon-Dunlop	
2	Maurice De Waele (BEL)	Alcyon-Dunlop	+ 41' 05"
3	André Leducq (FRA)	Alcyon-Dunlop	+ 1h 01' 59"
4			
5			
6			
7			
8			
9			
10			

== Stage 11 ==
30 June 1928 - Perpignan to Marseille, 363 km (226 mi)

Stage 11 result

Rank	Rider	Team	Time
1	André Leducq (FRA)	Alcyon-Dunlop	14h 41' 50"
2	Jean Bidot (FRA)	Alleluia-Wolber	s.t.
3	Jan Mertens (BEL)	Thomann-Dunlop	s.t.
4	Pierre Magne (FRA)	Alleluia-Wolber	s.t.
5	Marcel Bidot (FRA)	Alleluia-Wolber	s.t.
6	Antonin Magne (FRA)	Alleluia-Wolber	s.t.
7	Julien Vervaecke (BEL)	Armor-Dunlop	s.t.
8	Pé Verhaegen (BEL)	JB Louvet-Hutchinson	s.t.
9	Gaston Rebry (BEL)	Alcyon-Dunlop	s.t.
10	Maurice De Waele (BEL)	Alcyon-Dunlop	s.t.

General classification after stage 11

Rank	Rider	Team	Time
1	Nicolas Frantz (LUX)	Alcyon-Dunlop	
2	Maurice De Waele (BEL)	Alcyon-Dunlop	+ 41' 05"
3	André Leducq (FRA)	Alcyon-Dunlop	+ 1h 01' 59"
4			
5			
6			
7			
8			
9			
10			
