= 1928 Tour de France =

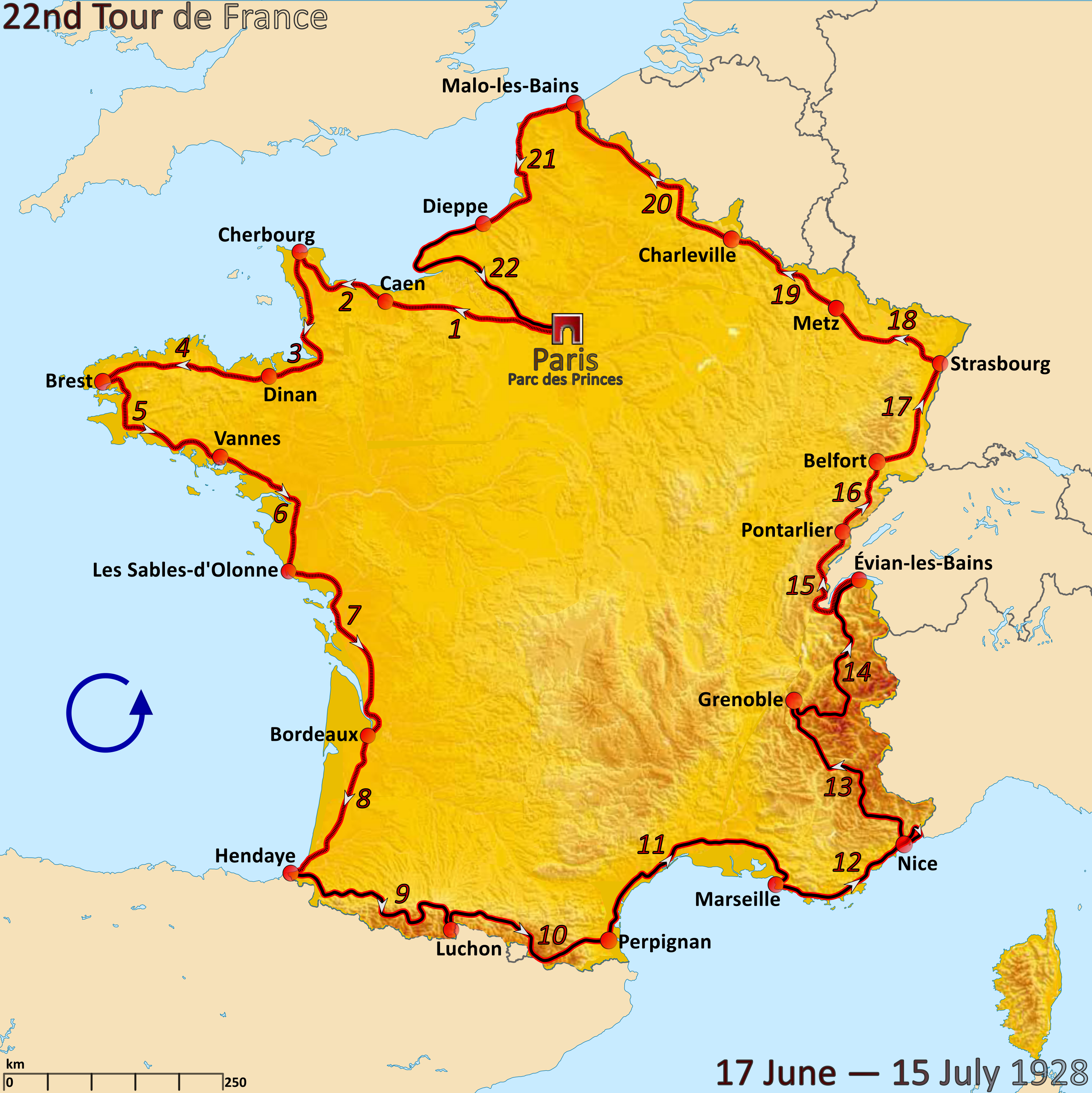
- Route of the 1928 Tour de France followed counterclockwise, starting in Paris

Race details
- Dates: 17 June – 15 July 1928
- Stages: 22
- Distance: 5,376 km (3,340 mi)
- Winning time: 192h 48' 58"

Results
Jersey awarded to the overall winner	Winner	Nicolas Frantz (LUX)	(Alcyon–Dunlop)
	Second	André Leducq (FRA)	(Alcyon–Dunlop)
	Third	Maurice De Waele (BEL)	(Alcyon–Dunlop)

The 1928 Tour de France was the 22nd edition of the Tour de France, taking place from 17 June to 15 July. It consisted of 22 stages over 5,376 km (3,340 mi).

The Tour was won by Nicolas Frantz, his second win. He held the yellow jersey from beginning to end, despite an incident three days before the end of the race. Frantz had a mechanical failure between Metz and Charleville and had to finish 100 km of the stage on an undersized women's bicycle, resulting in a loss of 28 minutes. Regardless, Frantz won the tour, with his Alcyon team winning the team trophy and having riders finish in second and third places.

The 22nd tour featured the first appearance of an Australian/New Zealand team, indicating the beginning of a more international sporting field. Their experience was turned into a film by Phil Keoghan, Le Ride, released in July 2016.

Tour director Henri Desgrange allowed teams to replace exhausted or injured cyclists with new riders, to give the weaker teams a fairer chance. However, the experiment backfired, having the opposite effect, so the concept was quickly abandoned.

== Innovations and changes ==
In the 1927 Tour de France, the team time trial format had been introduced, where teams started 15 minutes apart. This was done to make the flat stages more competitive. Although in 1927 this had not been successful, the formula was repeated in 1928; this time the teams started 10 minutes after each other.

The team time trial format had been an advantage to the strong teams; therefore the tour organisation invented a new rule, intended to help the weak teams: the teams were allowed to replace cyclists in the beginning of stage 12, halfway through the competition. They were not eligible for the general classification.

Another new concept was regional teams. The riders were separated in three groups: there were eight trade teams, nine regional teams of five riders and the touriste-routiers, without teams. Between them, the eight trade teams formed five competing units for the race. Three of them – Alcyon, Armor and Thomann, all of which had sponsorship from Dunlop – combined to compete as a single unit of ten riders. Elvish and Fontan, with Wolber sponsorship, did the same. The formidable Alcyon-Armor-Thomann combination would go on to fill the top five places overall.

In other years, the mountain stages, especially in the Pyrenees, had decided the race. To reduce the importance of these stages, the Tour organisation had changed the route of the first mountain stage, that had been the same since 1913. Two mountains, the Aspin and the Peyresourde, were left out of the stage.

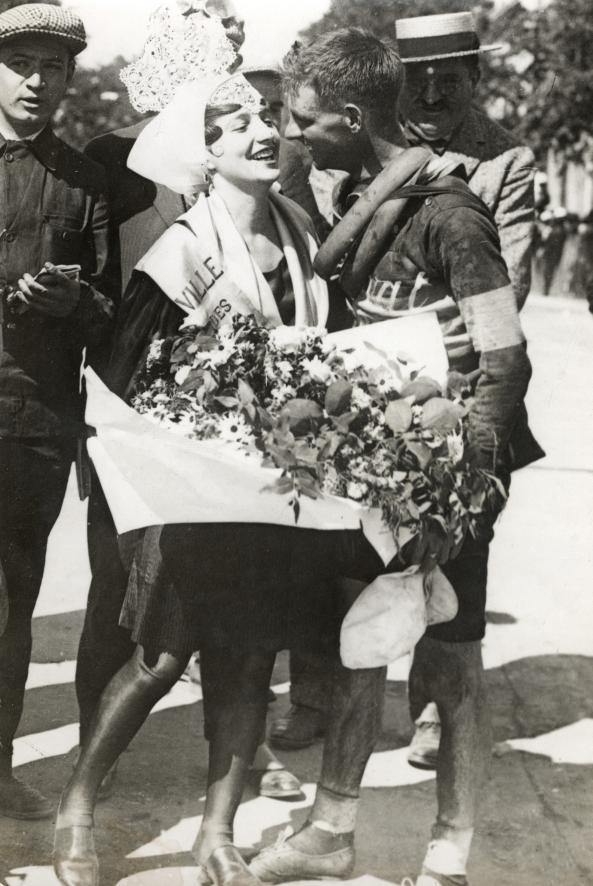
Kisses and flowers from the local beauty for Hubert Opperman after the 6th stage

The tour also saw the introduction of the Australian/New Zealand team, sponsored by Ravat. It was headed by Hubert Opperman, who had been the Australian cycling champion for a few years. After The Melbourne Herald had a campaign to send Opperman to the Tour de France, a team was made. The plan was to add six experienced European cyclists to the team, but this did not happen. Opperman rode some races in Europe and could compete with the European top cyclists, but the rest of his team could not. Because a major part of the race was in the team time trial format, Opperman had no chance to win the Tour. The Kennett Brothers wrote a book about the New Zealander on the team—Harry Watson—that was read by cycling enthusiast and The Amazing Race-host Phil Keoghan, who was surprised that he had never heard of the fellow Cantabrian before. Keoghan decided to celebrate the team's achievement and with a friend, he rode the 1928 stages on period bicycles to the original 26-day schedule. Their experience was turned into a film, Le Ride, which premiered in July 2016 in Watson's home town Christchurch.

== Teams ==
Altogether, 162 cyclists started the race, a new record at that time.

== Race overview ==
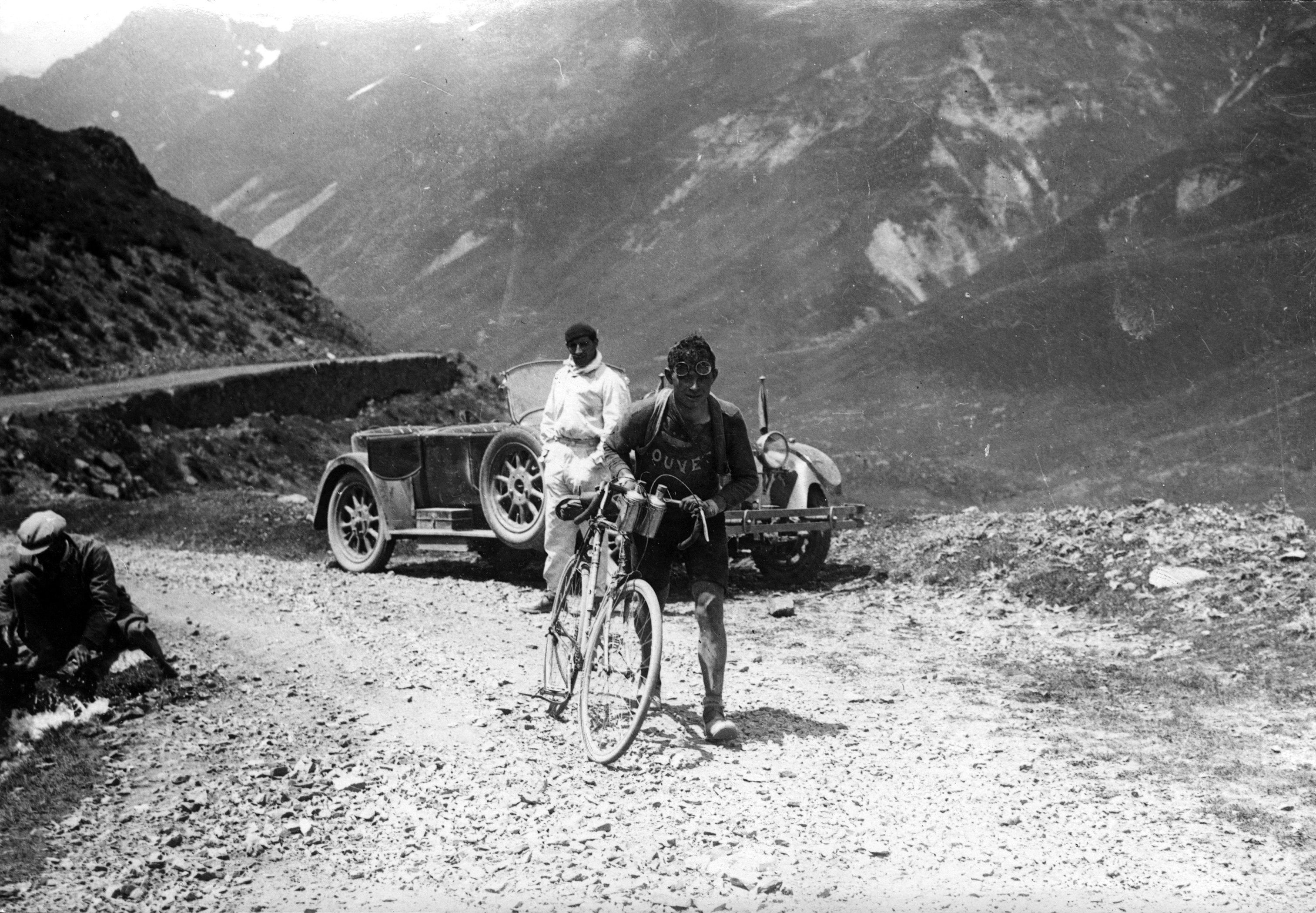
The Belgian Maurice Geldhof is climbing part of the Aubisque on foot.

In the first team-time-trial like stages, the Alcyon team emerged the best. The individual Touriste-routiers could not compete to the professional teams. The Alcyon team finished first in five of the eight stages. Nicolas Frantz, the winner of the previous tour, crossed the finish line first in the first stage, and was leading the classification, and kept the lead during these stages. After the first eight stages, Frantz was leading the race, followed by his teammate Maurice De Waele at 99 seconds. Julien Vervaecke, the Belgian from the Armor team, followed in third place, 135 seconds behind.

In stage 9, the first mountain stage, Frantz did not crush the competition as he had done on previous year. Instead, Victor Fontan, who was more than one and a half hour behind in the general classification, was allowed to escape and win the stage. Frantz still finished second, seven minutes behind, and extended his lead on his direct competitors, and was now leading by more than 40 minutes. In the tenth stage, the Alcyon team-mates Leducq, Frantz and De Waele finished first, and they now had the first three places in the general classification.

Next came the alps. Here, Frantz increased his lead. Behind him, De Waele gained time on Leducq, and was now in second place. After the alps, the three Alcyon cyclists still held the first three places in the general classification, with Frantz comfortably leading by more than 75 minutes. In the 19th stage, Frantz bicycle frame broke, when he rode over a railroad track. His sponsor, Alcyon, did not like the bad publicity, and wanted Frantz to go to an Alcyon dealer and get a replacement bike. The team manager from Alcyon was against this idea, because this would cause a major time loss, and maybe even the loss of the Tour de France. According to some sources, they found a bicycle shop that only had one bicycle left, an undersized women's bicycle, and they decided to take it. Other sources say that when they were thinking what to do, Frantz spotted a woman with a bicycle, and persuaded her to give him her bike. Frantz rode the last 100 km on this undersized women's bicycle, and did this with 27 km/h, whereas the winner of the stage had 34 km/h. His lead dropped with 30 minutes, but he was still leading the race.

In the 21st stage, Antonin Magne and Francis Bouillet had escaped together, and it was Bouillet who won the sprint. This was a problem for the Tour organisation, as Bouillet had already left the race in stage 9, to start again as a replacement in stage 12. Hence, he was no longer eligible for the general classification, and could not be the winner of a stage. The Tour organisation solved the problem by giving Bouillet the best time and proclaiming him the moral winner of the stage, and making Magne the official winner of the stage.

== Results ==
In stages 1 to 8 and 15 to 21, the cyclists started in teams. The cyclist who reached the finish fastest was the winner of the stage. In the other stages, all cyclists started together. The time that each cyclist required to finish the stage was recorded. For the general classification, these times were added up; the cyclist with the least accumulated time was the race leader, identified by the yellow jersey.

=== Stage winners ===
Nicolas Frantz wore the yellow jersey from the start of the race to the end of the race. Since the introduction of the yellow jersey in 1919, this has only happened in 1924, 1928 and 1935. As the winner of the previous year, Frantz also wore the yellow jersey during the first stage; he is the only cyclist to wear the yellow jersey during an entire Tour de France.

Stage characteristics and winners
Stage	Date	Course	Distance	Type (Note: The flat stages, 1 to 8 and 15 to 21, indicated by the clock icon, were run as team time trials. The other stages, indicated by the other icons, were run individually, and the icons show whether the stage included mountains.)	Winner	Race leader
1	17 June	Paris to Caen	207 km (129 mi)	Team time trial	Nicolas Frantz (LUX)	Nicolas Frantz (LUX)
2	18 June	Caen to Cherbourg-en-Cotentin	140 km (87 mi)	Team time trial	André Leducq (FRA)	Nicolas Frantz (LUX)
3	19 June	Cherbourg to Dinan	199 km (124 mi)	Team time trial	Gaston Rebry (BEL)	Nicolas Frantz (LUX)
4	20 June	Dinan to Brest	206 km (128 mi)	Team time trial	Pé Verhaegen (BEL)	Nicolas Frantz (LUX)
5	21 June	Brest to Vannes	208 km (129 mi)	Team time trial	Marcel Bidot (FRA)	Nicolas Frantz (LUX)
6	22 June	Vannes to Les Sables d'Olonne	204 km (127 mi)	Team time trial	Nicolas Frantz (LUX)	Nicolas Frantz (LUX)
7	23 June	Les Sables d'Olonne to Bordeaux	285 km (177 mi)	Team time trial	Victor Fontan (FRA)	Nicolas Frantz (LUX)
8	24 June	Bordeaux to Hendaye	225 km (140 mi)	Team time trial	Maurice Dewaele (BEL)	Nicolas Frantz (LUX)
9	26 June	Hendaye to Luchon	387 km (240 mi)	Stage with mountain(s)	Victor Fontan (FRA)	Nicolas Frantz (LUX)
10	28 June	Luchon to Perpignan	323 km (201 mi)	Stage with mountain(s)	André Leducq (FRA)	Nicolas Frantz (LUX)
11	30 June	Perpignan to Marseille	363 km (226 mi)	Plain stage	André Leducq (FRA)	Nicolas Frantz (LUX)
12	2 July	Marseille to Nice	330 km (210 mi)	Stage with mountain(s)	Nicolas Frantz (LUX)	Nicolas Frantz (LUX)
13	4 July	Nice to Grenoble	333 km (207 mi)	Stage with mountain(s)	Antonin Magne (FRA)	Nicolas Frantz (LUX)
14	6 July	Grenoble to Evian	329 km (204 mi)	Stage with mountain(s)	Julien Moineau (FRA)	Nicolas Frantz (LUX)
15	8 July	Evian to Pontarlier	213 km (132 mi)	Team time trial	Pierre Magne (FRA)	Nicolas Frantz (LUX)
16	9 July	Pontarlier to Belfort	119 km (74 mi)	Team time trial	André Leducq (FRA)	Nicolas Frantz (LUX)
17	10 July	Belfort to Strasbourg	145 km (90 mi)	Team time trial	Joseph Mauclair (FRA)	Nicolas Frantz (LUX)
18	11 July	Strasbourg to Metz	165 km (103 mi)	Team time trial	Nicolas Frantz (LUX)	Nicolas Frantz (LUX)
19	12 July	Metz to Charleville	159 km (99 mi)	Team time trial	Marcel Huot (FRA)	Nicolas Frantz (LUX)
20	13 July	Charleville to Malo-les-Bains	271 km (168 mi)	Team time trial	Maurice Dewaele (BEL)	Nicolas Frantz (LUX)
21	14 July	Malo-les-Bains to Dieppe	234 km (145 mi)	Team time trial	Antonin Magne (FRA)	Nicolas Frantz (LUX)
22	15 July	Dieppe to Paris	331 km (206 mi)	Plain stage	Nicolas Frantz (LUX)	Nicolas Frantz (LUX)
	Total		5,376 km (3,340 mi)			

=== General classification ===
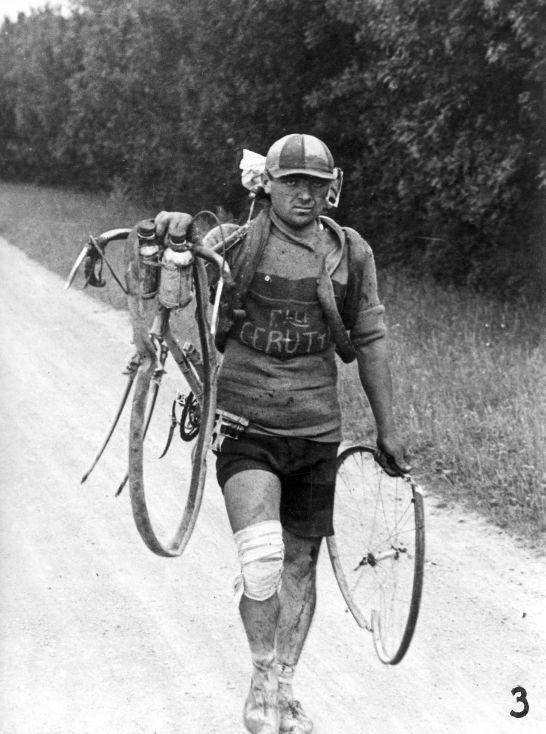
Italian Giusto Cerutti has a broken wheel after a fall. According to the rules he is not allowed to accept help.

The Alcyon team had all the podium positions. Since 1928, it has never happened again that one team had all the podium positions.

Final general classification (1–10)
Rank	Rider	Sponsor	Time
1	Nicolas Frantz (LUX)	Alcyon–Dunlop	192h 48' 58"
2	André Leducq (FRA)	Alcyon–Dunlop	+ 50' 07"
3	Maurice De Waele (BEL)	Alcyon–Dunlop	+ 56' 16"
4	Jan Mertens (BEL)	Thomann–Dunlop	+ 1h 19' 18"
5	Julien Vervaecke (BEL)	Armor–Dunlop	+ 1h 53' 32"
6	Antonin Magne (FRA)	Alleluia–Wolber	+ 2h 14' 02"
7	Victor Fontan (FRA)	Elvish–Wolber	+ 5h 07' 47"
8	Marcel Bidot (FRA)	Alleluia–Wolber	+ 5h 18' 28"
9	Marcel Huot (FRA)	Alleluia–Wolber	+ 5h 37' 33"
10	Pierre Magne (FRA)	Alleluia–Wolber	+ 5h 41' 20"

Final general classification (11–41)
Rank	Rider	Sponsor	Time
11	Joseph Mauclair (FRA)	Armor–Dunlop	+ 5h 44' 01"
12	Gaston Rebry (BEL)	Alcyon–Dunlop	+ 5h 53' 44"
13	Louis Delannoy (BEL)	Armor–Dunlop	+ 6h 11' 35"
14	Camille Van de Casteele (BEL)	J.B. Louvet-Hutchinson	+ 6h 52' 55"
15	Salvador Cardona (ESP)	Elvish–Wolber	+ 7h 33' 47"
16	Pé Verhaegen (BEL)	J.B. Louvet-Hutchinson	+ 7h 39' 56"
17	Julien Moineau (FRA)	Alleluia–Wolber	+ 8h 03' 23"
18	Hubert Opperman (AUS)	Ravat-Wonder-Dunlop	+ 8h 34' 25"
19	Désiré Louesse (BEL)	Alcyon–Dunlop	+ 9h 27' 21"
20	Odiel Taillieu (BEL)	J.B. Louvet-Hutchinson	+ 10h 23' 18"
21	Jean Mouveroux (FRA)	Fontan-Wolber	+ 10h 49' 53"
22	Jean Bidot (FRA)	Alleluia–Wolber	+ 10h 56' 30"
23	Marcel Autaa (FRA)	Fontan-Wolber	+ 11h 42' 40"
24	Raymond Decorte (BEL)	J.B. Louvet-Hutchinson	+ 12h 27' 02"
25	Paul Filliat (FRA)	South-East France	+ 15h 51' 56"
26	Raphael Calmette (FRA)	Fontan-Wolber	+ 15h 55' 08"
27	Maurice Arnoult (FRA)	Normandy	+ 16h 25' 04"
28	Harry Watson (NZL)	Ravat-Wonder-Dunlop	+ 16h 53' 32"
29	Lucien Laval (FRA)	Elvish–Wolber	+ 16h 53' 55"
30	Marcel Colleu (FRA)	Alsace-Lorraine	+ 17h 04' 01"
31	Amand Goubert (FRA)	North France	+ 18h 50' 20"
32	René Hamel (FRA)	J.B. Louvet-Hutchinson	+ 19h 10' 18"
33	Paul Delbart (FRA)	Champagne	+ 19h 51' 17"
34	Henri François (FRA)	Champagne	+ 20h 02' 46"
35	Fernand Moulet (FRA)	Champagne	+ 20h 10' 21"
36	Raphael Dupau (FRA)	Fontan-Wolber	+ 20h 47' 54"
37	François Menta (FRA)	Côte d'Azur	+ 21h 05' 32"
38	Percy Osborn (AUS)	Ravat-Wonder-Dunlop	+ 22h 01' 49"
39	Fernand Fayolle (FRA)	Côte d'Azur	+ 24h 02' 10"
40	Lucien Lange (FRA)	Alsace-Lorraine	+ 25h 30' 57"
41	Edouard Persin (FRA)	Champagne	+ 26h 56' 19"

=== Other classifications ===
The organising newspaper, L'Auto named a meilleur grimpeur (best climber), an unofficial precursor to the modern King of the Mountains competition. This award was won by Victor Fontan.

There was also a team trophy. The team trophy for teams was won by Alcyon, the Champagne-regional team won the team trophy for regional teams. This team trophy was not the same as the team classification that has been run since 1930.

== Aftermath ==
The team time trial method had not given the desired result; in the 1929 Tour de France it was only used if the previous stage had been too slow, and after 1929 it disappeared. The rule with replaced cyclists did not even make it until the next year.

Some riders had been grouped in regional teams; this was considered successful; in 1930 the system would change to the national team system, where riders were grouped in national or regional teams.

== Bibliography ==
- Augendre, Jacques (2016). Guide historique [Historical guide] (PDF) (in French). Paris: Amaury Sport Organisation. Archived (PDF) from the original on 17 August 2016.
- Kennett, Jonathan; Wall, Bronwen (2004). Ride: The Story of Cycling in New Zealand. Kennett Bros. ISBN 978-0-9583490-7-9.
- McGann, Bill; McGann, Carol (2006). The Story of the Tour de France: 1903–1964. Vol. 1. Indianapolis, IN: Dog Ear Publishing. ISBN 978-1-59858-180-5.
