= Paris–Caen =

Race details
- Discipline: Road
- Type: One-day race

History
- First edition: 1902
- Editions: 23
- Final edition: 1946
- First winner: Eugène Bernaud (FRA)
- Final winner: Jean Guéguen (FRA)

Paris–Caen was a single-day professional road cycling race held between Paris and Caen from 1902 to 1909 and 1923 to 1946.

== Winners ==
Year	Winner	Second	Third
1902	(France) Eugène Bernaud	(France) Maurice Mathias	(France) Lorphelin
1903	(France) René Pottier (France) Marcel Cadolle		(France) Maurice Mathias
1904	(France) Gabriel Petit	(France) Paul Armbruster	(France) Jourdain
1905	(France) Marcel Cadolle	(France) Marcel Berthet	(France) Garrigou
1906	(France) Pierre Frère	(France) Philippe Leroux	(France) Marcel Berthet
1907	(France) Auguste Sabatier	(France) Albert Colboc	(France) Marius Chocque
1908	(France) Philippe Leroux	(France) Émile Daliphard	(France) Alphonse Charpiot
1909	(France) Léon Vallotton	(France) Gaston Lorrain	(France) E. Legrand
1910–1922	No race		
1923	(France) Pierre Beffarat	(Switzerland) Charles Parel	(Switzerland) A. Groslimond
1924	(France) Marcel Colleu	(France) Marcel Godard	(France) Marcel Bidot
1925	(Belgium) Camille Van de Casteele	(Belgium) Charles Mondelaers	(France) Marcel Godard
1926	(Belgium) Camille Van de Casteele	(France) Alexis Blanc Garin	Angelo Gremo
1927	(France) Roger Gregoire	(Belgium) Julien Vervaecke	(France) Alexis Blanc Garin
1928	(France) Pierre Beffarat	(France) Arsène Alancourt	(France) Joseph Mauclair
1929	(France) Jules Merviel	(France) Albert Barthélémy	(France) Pierre Magne
1930	(France) André Leducq	(France) Antonin Magne	(France) Jules Merviel
1931	(France) Roger Bisseron	(France) Ferdinand Le Drogo	(France) André Leducq
1932	(France) Benoît Fauré	(France) Julien Moineau	(France) Sylvain Marcaillou
1933	(France) René Le Grevès	(France) Léon Le Calvez	(France) Joseph Mauclair
1934	(France) Jean Noret	(France) Sylvain Marcaillou	(France) Adrien Buttafocchi
1935	(France) Maurice Archambaud	(France) Jean Noret	(France) Léon Level
1936	(France) Émile Ignat	(France) Paul Maye	(France) Louis Thiétard
1937	(France) Raoul Lesueur	(France) André Auville	(France) Guy Lapébie
1938	(France) René Le Grevès	(France) Sauveur Ducazeaux	(France) Pierre Cloarec
1939	(France) Louis Thiétard	(France) Gérard Virol	(France) Lucien Lauk
1941	(France) René Debenne	(France) Louis Thiétard	(France) Robert Oubron
1945	(France) Louis Thiétard	(France) Gabriel Gaudin	(France) Jean Robic
1946	(France) Jean Guéguen	(France) Henri Aubry	(France) René Lauk
