= Trail difficulty rating system =

Degree of difficulty of a walking trail

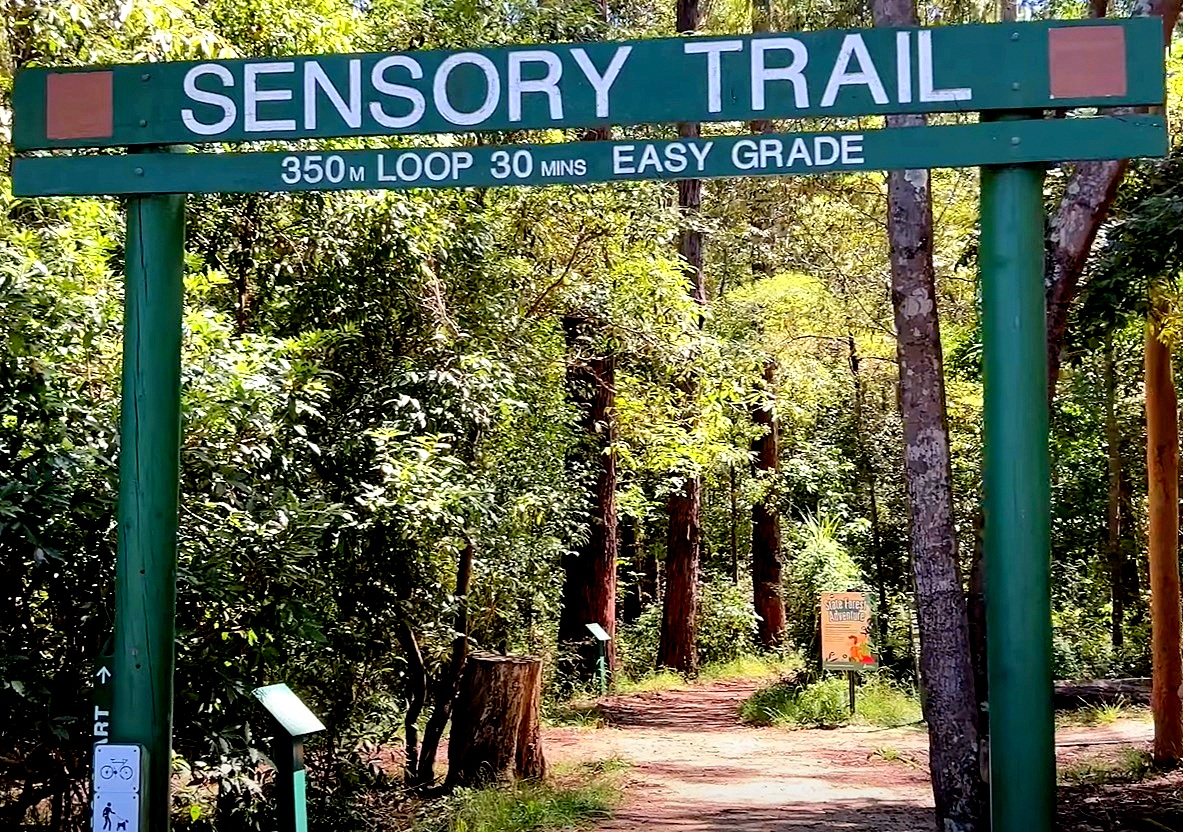
A trailhead signage that shows the grade of a walking path at a park in Sydney, Australia.

A trail difficulty rating system, also known as walking track grading system, walk gradings or trail grades, is a classification system for trails or walking paths based on their relative technical and physical difficulty. A trail difficulty rating system informs visitors about the attributes of walking tracks and helps visitors, particularly those who are not usual bushwalkers, make decisions to walk on trails that suit their skill level, manage their risk, improve their experience and assist in the planning of trails and trail systems.

The grading system features a recognizable criteria for visitors, so they can tell the difficulty of a certain walk, thereby allowing the walkers to determine whether they have the physical ability to attempt the walk. The width, length and surface of the trail are important factors to determine the grading, in addition to natural obstacles such as rocks, ridges, holes, logs and drop-offs. The grading system is based on the physical attributes that are present during the course and the challenges, rather than the effort and fitness that is necessary by the walker. Trail length is not a standard of the system. Rather, trail distance should be posted on signs in addition to the difficulty symbol.

== On foot ==
=== Australia ===
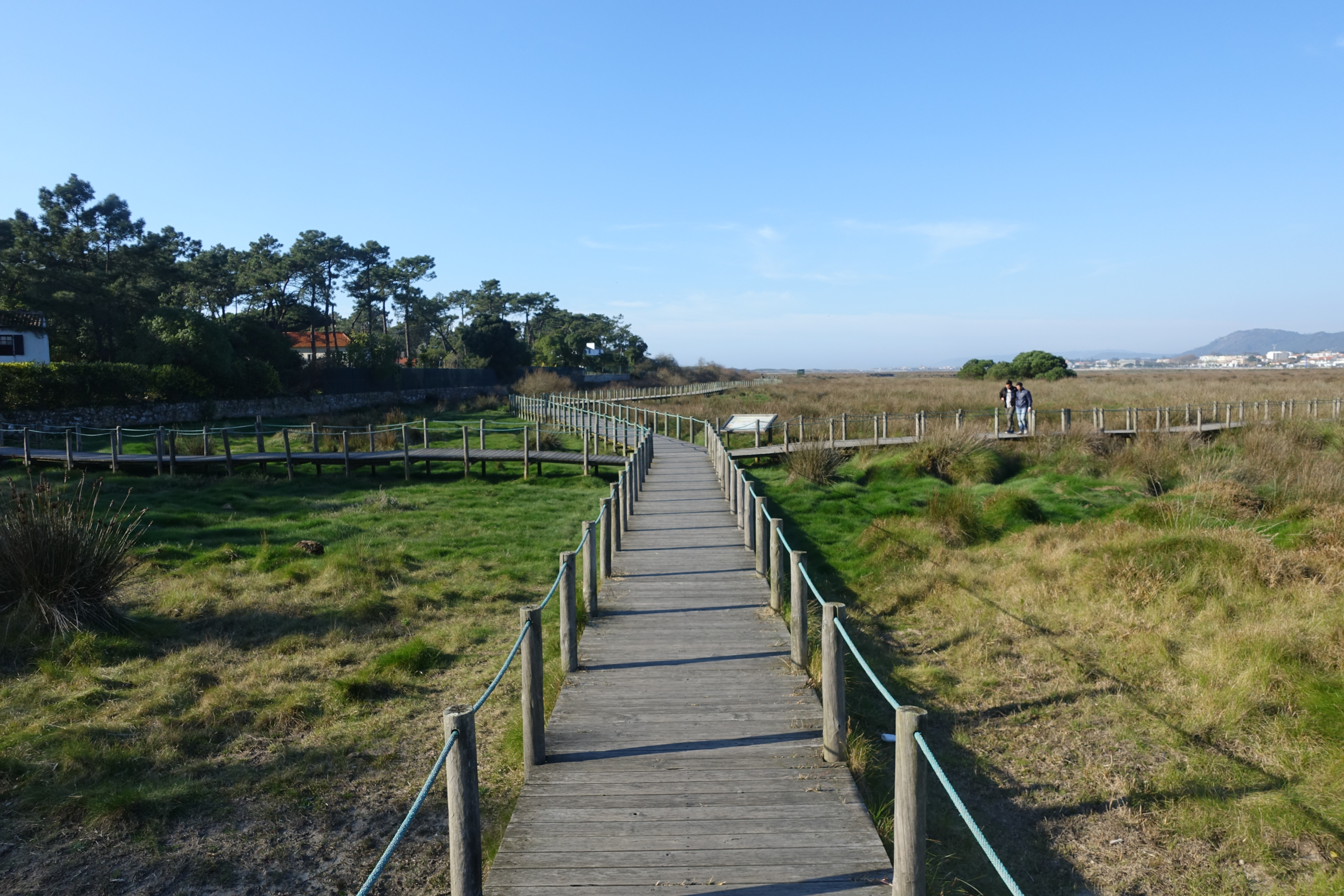
Flat or even walking paths are easy for walkers and would have disability access.

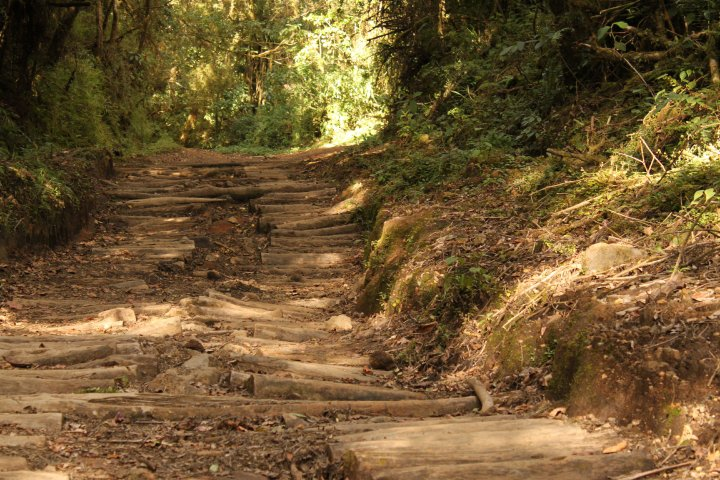
A hilly walking path usually has a moderate grade in the rating systems

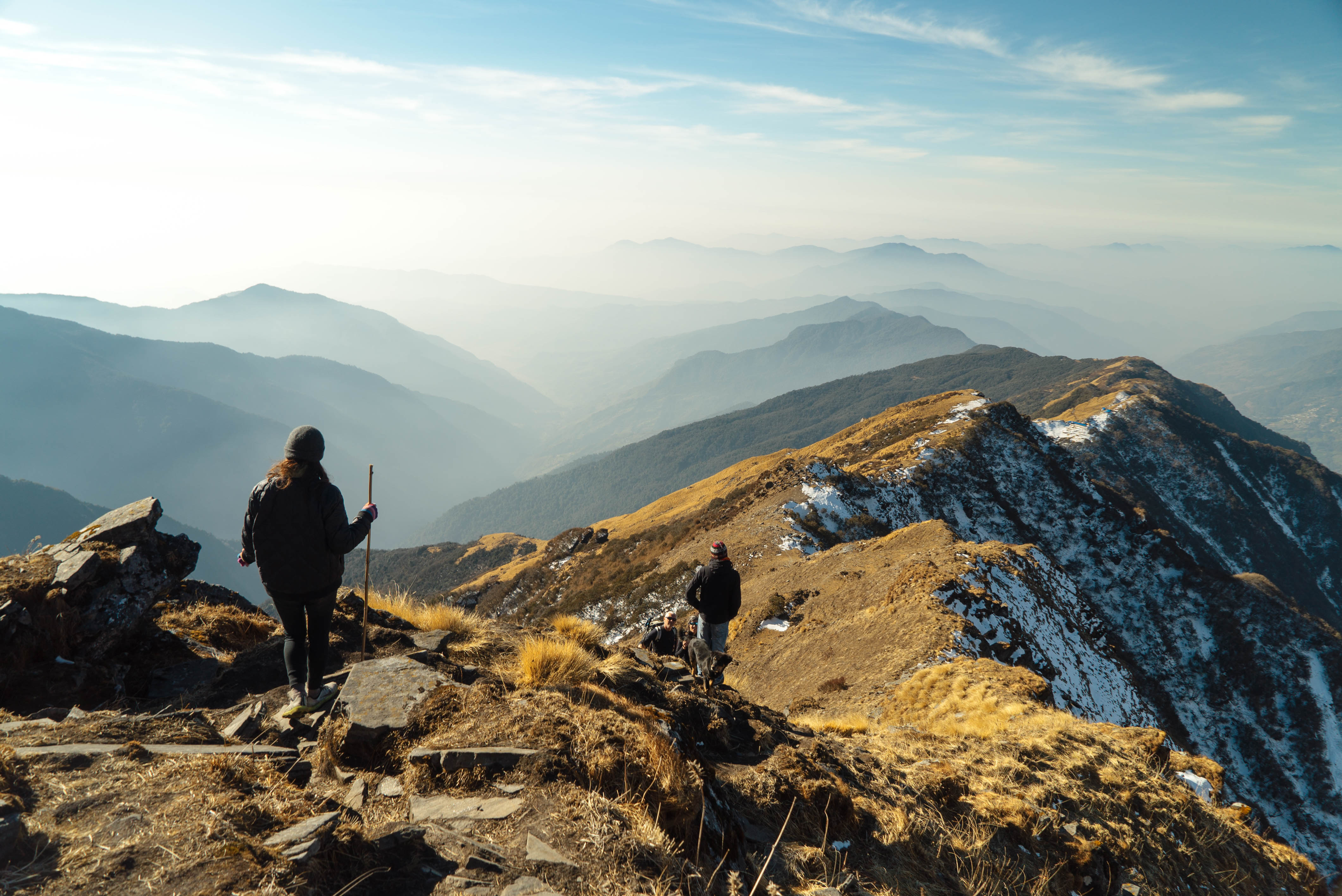
Mountain hiking usually has a difficult rating due to the physical challenges encountered.

The Australian Walking Track Grading System evaluates a path's difficulty level based on various criteria, such as: experience needed, steps, slopes, path quality and signage. The system features five grades, which are usually displayed at national parks or state parks: (Note: Australian urban parks generally do not have a grading system for the walking paths therein. Regional parks tend to have their own grading scheme designated by the local council.)

- Grade 1 (Easy/Disabled Access) – "No bushwalking experience required. Flat even surface with no steps or steep sections."
- Grade 2 (Easy) – "No bushwalking experience required. The track is hardened or compacted surface and may have a gentle hill section or sections and occasional steps."
- Grade 3 (Moderate) – "Suitable for most ages and fitness levels. Some bushwalking experience recommended."
- Grade 4 (Moderate-Difficult) – "Bushwalking experience recommended. Tracks may be long, rough and very steep."
- Grade 5 (Difficult) – "Very experienced bushwalkers with specialised skills, including navigation and emergency first aid."

==== Tasmania ====
Tasmania has its own walking track classification system:

- T1 – Easy to Moderate: "Well defined and wide tracks on easy to moderate terrain, in slightly modified natural environments."
- T2 – Moderate: "Narrower but distinct tracks which can be muddy in some places, in pristine natural environments."
- T3 – Challenging: "You will experience marked but often-indistinct tracks, in very remote and wild areas. These challenging walks need a high level of fitness and some hiking experience."
- T4 – Difficult: "Tracks are often faint or unmarked in remote and craggy natural areas."

=== Canada ===
Canada features four grades for walking trails, although some provinces may have their own system. Here is the standard grading system:

- Easy – "No experience needed. Hard-packed surface, no obstacles, minimal stairs. Little or no change in elevation."
- Moderate – "Some basic trail experience needed. Mostly stable surface with infrequent obstacles, there may be stairs. Moderate changes in elevation, some short steep sections."
- Difficult – "Trail experience needed. Different surface types, including some that are not maintained. Major change in elevation with long steep sections."
- Route – "Exceptional trail and navigational experience needed. A variety of terrain: wet areas, loose rocks, exposure, thick forest."

=== Montreal ===
Montreal features five levels:

- Level 1 – "Relatively even terrain"
- Level 2 – "Uneven terrain"
- Level 3 – "Rough terrain"
- Level 4 – "Rough terrain, some scrambling"
- Level 5 – "Often very rough terrain, more scrambling"

=== Ireland ===
Ireland has a set of five classifications for trails:

- Class 1: Multiaccess – "All users including people with reduced mobility."
- Class 2: Easy – "Family groups including children and the elderly. "
- Class 3: Moderate – "People with a moderate level of fitness."
- Class 4: Strenuous – "People accustomed to walking rough trails and with a high level of fitness."
- Class 5: Very Difficult – "Only suitable for people accustomed to walking in remote areas and with a high level of fitness and navigation skills."

=== New Zealand ===
New Zealand national parks features four grades: (Note: Some regional parks in New Zealand may have their own grading system, usually differing or altering from the official system.)

- Easiest: Easy Access Short Walk – "Even surface, well formed with no steps or steep sections. Stream and rivers are bridged."
- Easiest: Short Walk – "Track is well formed, with an even, well drained surface. There may be steps. Stream and rivers crossings are bridged."
- Intermediate – "Track is generally well formed, some sections may be rough, muddy or steep. Track has signs, poles or markers. Major stream and river crossings are bridged."
- Advanced – "Track is mostly unformed, may be rough and steep. Track has markers, poles or rock cairns. Expect unbridged stream and river crossings."
- Expert – "People with high level backcountry (remote areas) skills and experience, navigation and survival skills required. Complete self sufficiency required."

=== Switzerland ===
Switzerland has two trail difficulty scales (not including mountaineering), maintained by the Swiss Hiking Association (SWW) and the Swiss Alpine Club (SAC). Marked trails (as well as the official trail maps) usually carry the markings from the Swiss Hiking Association. In addition to the hiking difficulty scale, the Swiss Alpine Club also publishes the Alpine Grade Scale, focused on mountaineering routes.

Swiss Hiking Trail Difficulty Classification
SAC Scale	SWW Markings	Description
T1	Yellow	"Well-constructed footpath. Where possible, all exposed areas are made secure with fixed cables, railings, etc. The risk of falling can largely be ruled out with normal behavior."
T2	White-red-white	"Continuous established footpath. Exposed areas made more secure. Partially steep terrain. Risk of falling not ruled out."
T3	White-red-white	"Path not always obvious / visible. The more exposed areas can be secured. You may need your hands for balance. Some exposed areas remain where there is a risk of falling. Pathless sections over scree or talus."
T4	White-blue-white	"Occasionally pathless. In certain places you’ll need to use your hands. Some quite exposed terrain, e.g. steep grass slopes, rock ledges, simple firn fields and minor glacier passages (with little crevasse risk)."
T5	White-blue-white	"Often pathless. Individual easy climbing sections. Exposed, challenging terrain, steep cliffs. Bare glaciers and firn slopes which pose some risk of falling."
T6	Usually unmarked	"Mostly pathless. Grade II scrambling. Often very exposed. Terrain examples: dangerous talus slopes, rock gullies, steeper sections of snow-free glaciers = increased risk of falling."

=== United Kingdom ===
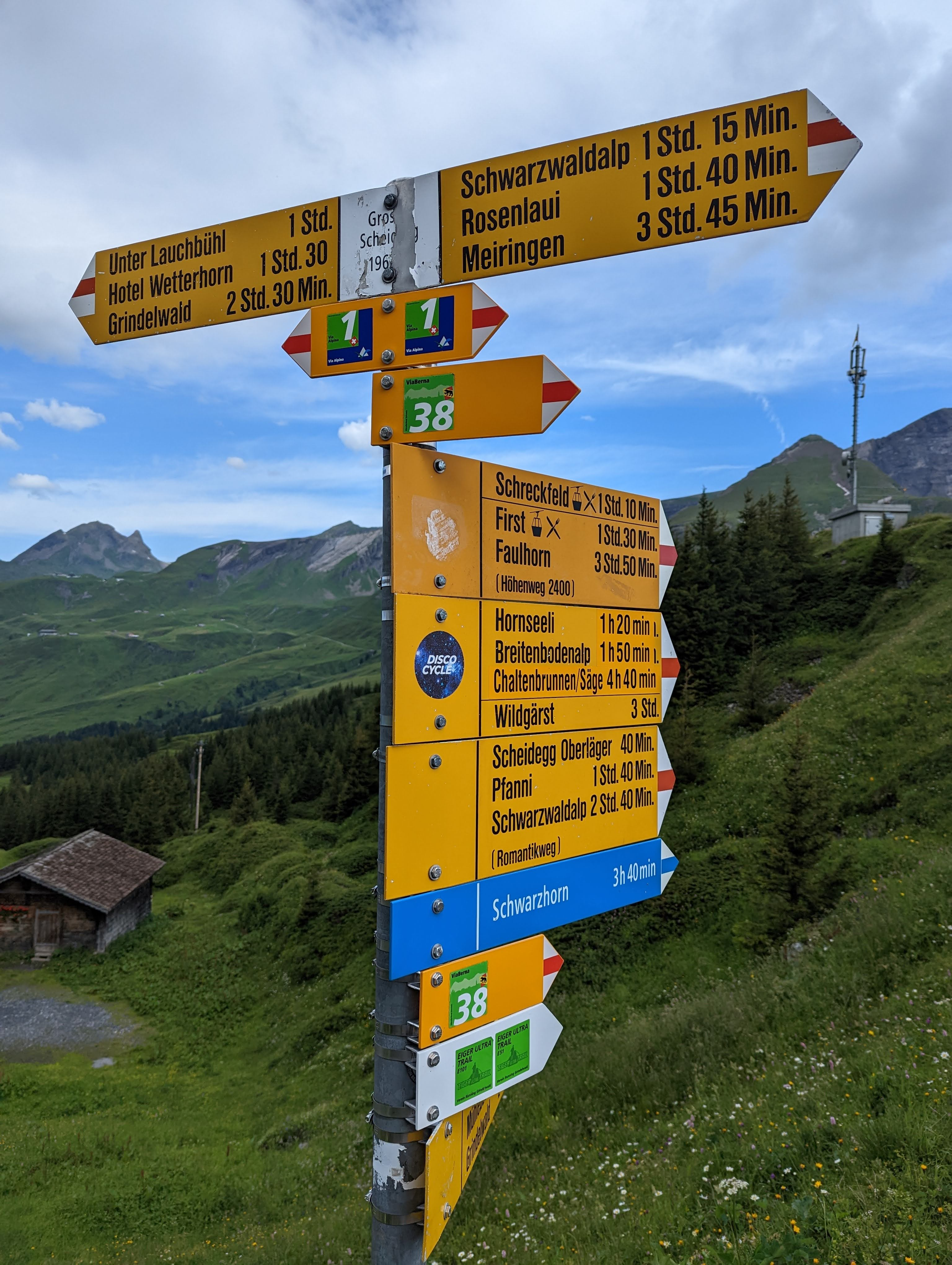
A Swiss hiking trail signpost at Grosse Scheidegg, showing markings for different difficulties

The United Kingdom has three grades in their classification system, which are: (Note: Some areas or regions in the United Kingdom may have a different trailing grading system for their parkland's walking trails.)

- Grade 1 – "An easy walk on pavement or well maintained paths without stiles and only moderate hills."
- Grade 2 – "A moderate walk in any setting with some difficult paths and the possibility of one or more substantial hills."
- Grade 3 – "A more difficult walk, mainly on poorly maintained path or tracks, through rough fields or woods. There may be steep climbs, rough uneven terrain or frequent stiles."

=== United States ===
==== Arizona ====
Arizona's trail ratings are as follows:

- Easiest – "Paved Accessible Trail. Paved or hard and smooth."
- Easy – "Mostly smooth and wide. Dirt with occasional unevenness."
- Moderate – "Mostly smooth, variable width. Dirt with occasional unevenness."
- Moderate Difficult – "Mostly uneven surfaces. Dirt and rock."
- Difficult – "Long rocky segments with possible drops and exposure. Dirt and loose rock with continual unevenness."
- Extremely Difficult – "Long rocky segments with possible drops and exposure. Dirt and loose rock with continual unevenness."

==== California ====
In California, there are three different ratings according to the California Department of Parks & Recreation:

- Easy: "1–2 miles with easy terrain and little elevation gain."
- Moderate: "2–4 miles with moderate terrain and some elevation change."
- Challenging: "4 or more miles OR varying terrain."

== Bicycle ==
=== International ===
IMBA Trail Difficulty Rating System:

- White circle – Easiest
- Green circle – Easy
- Blue square – More difficult
- Black diamond – Very difficult
- Double black diamond – Extremely difficult

Variations on the above system may include:

- Green circle with blue border – Easy with intermediate sections
- Blue square with black border – Intermediate with difficult sections

=== New Zealand ===
In New Zealand, the Department of Conservation (New Zealand) uses six grades in the national parks, which are based upon those created by the Kennett Brothers.

Mountain biking track grades in New Zealand
Grading	Level of difficulty	Description
Grade 1	Easiest	"Fairly flat, wide, smooth track or gravel road."
Grade 2	Easy	"Mostly flat with some gentle climbs on smooth track with easily avoidable obstacles such as rocks and potholes."
Grade 3	Intermediate	"Steep slopes and/or avoidable obstacles possibly on narrow track and/or with poor traction. There may be exposure at the track’s outside edge."
Grade 4	Advanced	"A mixture of long, steep climbs, narrow track, poor traction and obstacles that are difficult to avoid or jump over. Generally exposed at the track’s outside edge. Most riders will find some sections easier to walk."
Grade 5	Expert	"Technically challenging. Giant climbs, narrow track and numerous hazards including dangerous drop-offs, sharp corners and difficult obstacles. Expect walking and possibly bike carrying."
Grade 6	Extreme	"Downhill/free ride specific tracks. Extremely steep sections with large drop-offs and other unavoidable obstacles. May include man made structures and jumps."

=== United Kingdom ===
Trails in the UK are often managed by Forestry England who use an updated version of the CTC off-road trail grades since July 2023.

Mountain biking track grades in the UK
Grading	Level of difficulty	Description
Green	Easy	"Relatively flat, wide and smooth trails. Gentle climbs, descents, rollers and berms, with easy to avoid features such as rocks and potholes. Surface might be loose, uneven or muddy at times."
Blue	Moderate	"A mixture of climbs and descents with moderate gradients, technical features like tree roots and rock steps; jumps and berms. Rollable features at controlled speed. Variable surfaces."
Red	Difficult	"A mixture of steep climbs, descents and / or avoidable features. Larger jumps, berms and rollable features at controlled speed. Technical features such as tree roots, drop-offs and large rocks. Very variable surfaces."
Black	Severe	"Long, steep climbs, descents and jumps. Numerous hazards including drop-offs, sharp corners and difficult features. Rapid rate of surface change. Commitment required."
Double-black	Extreme	"Very fast and steep descents. Large drop-offs, jumps and unavoidable obstacles that require high levels of skill and commitment. Extreme level of exposure or risk. Rapid rate of surface change."

== Car ==
=== Australia ===
Australian National Four-Wheel Drive Council (ANFWDC), supported by Four-Wheel Drive QLD (FWDQLD):

- Green – All wheel drive (AWD), high range (4High), highway tyres
- Blue – Low range (4Low) required, highway tyres
- Black – Low range, standard 4WD ground clearance (210mm or more), all-terrain (AT) tyres
- Red – Low range, high ground clearance (235mm or more), mud-terrain (MT) tyres

== Motorcycle ==
=== Australia ===
DSMRA Grading System:

- Grade 0 – Touring
- Grade 1 – Easy
- Grade 2 – General
- Grade 3 – Hard
- Grade 4 – Hardest

== Equestrian ==
=== Australia ===
South Australia horse trail difficulty rating system:

- Green circle – Easiest
- Blue square – Intermediate
- Black diamond – Advanced

== See also ==
- Grade
- Piste
- Fastpacking
- Trail blazing
