= Mauclair =

Mauclair is a surname of French origin. Notable people with the surname include:

- Camille Mauclair (1872–1945), French poet, novelist, biographer, travel writer, and art critic
- Jacques Mauclair (1919–2001), French actor
- Joseph Mauclair (1906–1990), French road bicycle racer
