= 1929 Paris–Tours =

Race details
- Dates: 5 May 1929
- Stages: 1
- Distance: 253 km (157.2 mi)
- Winning time: 9h 14' 55"

Results
	Winner	Nicolas Frantz (LUX)
	Second	Aimé Déolet (BEL)
	Third	Georges Ronsse (BEL)

The 1929 Paris–Tours was the 24th edition of the Paris–Tours cycle race and was held on 5 May 1929. The race started in Paris and finished in Tours. The race was won by Nicolas Frantz.

== General classification ==
Final general classification

Rank	Rider	Time
1	Nicolas Frantz (LUX)	9h 14' 55"
2	Aimé Déolet (BEL)	+ 0"
3	Georges Ronsse (BEL)	+ 0"
4	Roger Bisseron (FRA)	+ 0"
5	Aimé Dossche (BEL)	+ 0"
6	Jef Demuysere (BEL)	+ 0"
7	Jean Aerts (BEL)	+ 0"
7	Romain Bellenger (FRA)	+ 0"
7	Jean Bidot (FRA)	+ 0"
7	Marcel Bidot (FRA)	+ 0"
