= Édouard Persin =

French cyclist

Personal information
- Full name: Édouard Marie Eugène Persin
- Born: 27 March 1902 Bèze, Côte-d'Or, France
- Died: 14 December 1982 (aged 80) Chaumont-la-Ville, Haute-Marne, France

Cycling career
- Sport: Cycling
- Role: Rider

Édouard Marie Eugène Persin (27 March 1902 – 14 December 1982) was a French racing cyclist. He finished in last place in the 1928 Tour de France.
