= 1928 Tour of Flanders =

Race details
- Dates: March 25, 1928
- Stages: 1
- Distance: 225 km (139.8 mi)
- Winning time: 6h 55' 00"

Results
	Winner	Jan Mertens (BEL)
	Second	August Mortelmans (BEL)
	Third	Louis Delannoy (BEL)

The 13th edition of the Tour of Flanders cycling classic race was held on Sunday, 25 March 1928. Belgian Jan Mertens won the Monument. Of the 40 starting cyclists, 25 reached the finish.

== Route ==
The race had Ghent as both start and finish place and covered 225 km.

The course featured 3 categorized climbs:

- Kwaremont
- Tiegemberg
- Kruisberg

== Race report ==
The final winner was Jan Mertens, who won in Ghent in front of his four breakaway companions. August Mortelmans finished second, while Louis Delannoy took the third place

Mertens completed the race with an average of 32.530 km/h.

== General classification ==
=== Final general classification ===
Rank	Rider	Team	Time
1	Jan Mertens (BEL)	Securitas	6h 55' 00"
2	August Mortelmans (BEL)	Touring-Pirelli	s.t.
3	Louis Delannoy (BEL)	Securitas	s.t.
4	Lucien Buysse (BEL)	Automoto	s.t.
5	Armand Van Bruaene (BEL)	La Nordiste	s.t.
6	Leander Gijssels (BEL)	Automoto	+ 7' 30"
7	Julien Vervaecke (BEL)	Armor-Dunlop	+ 7' 35"
8	Joseph Van Dam (BEL)	Individual	+ 8' 30"
9	Jules Deschepper (BEL)	Van Hauwaert	+ 8' 35"
10	Raoul Degroote (BEL)	Individual	+ 8' 40"
