= Marcel Autaa =

French cyclist

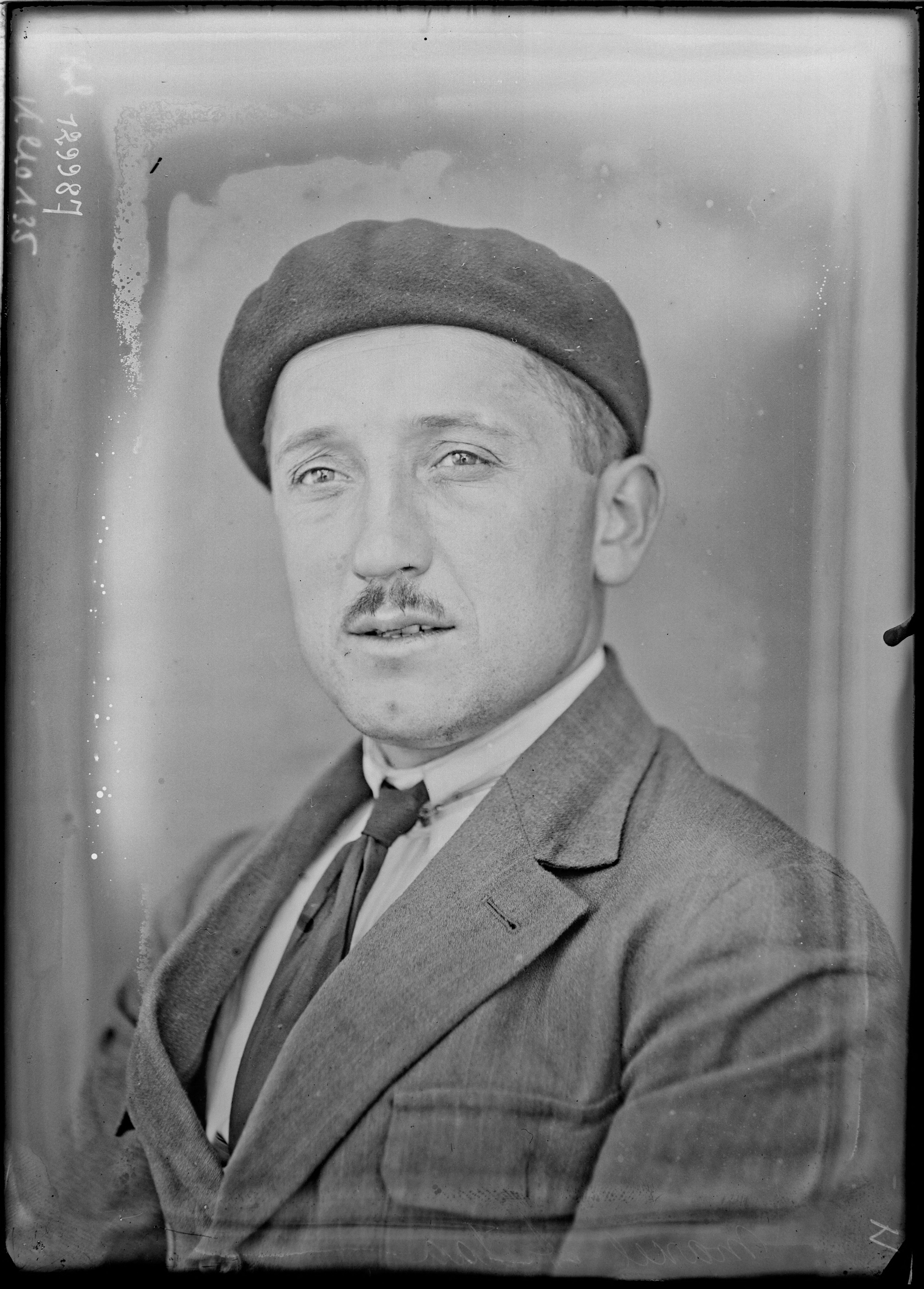

Personal information
- Born: 28 August 1902
- Died: 12 December 1959 (aged 57)

Cycling career
- Sport: Cycling
- Discipline: Road
- Role: Rider

Marcel Autaa (28 August 1902 – 12 December 1959) was a French racing cyclist. He rode in the 1928 Tour de France.
