= Giusto Cerutti =

Italian cyclist

Personal information
- Born: 9 March 1903
- Died: 17 December 1993 (aged 90)

Cycling career
- Sport: Cycling
- Discipline: Road
- Role: Rider

Giusto Cerutti (9 March 1903 – 17 December 1993) was an Italian racing cyclist. He rode in the 1928 Tour de France.
