= Raphaël Calmette =

French cyclist

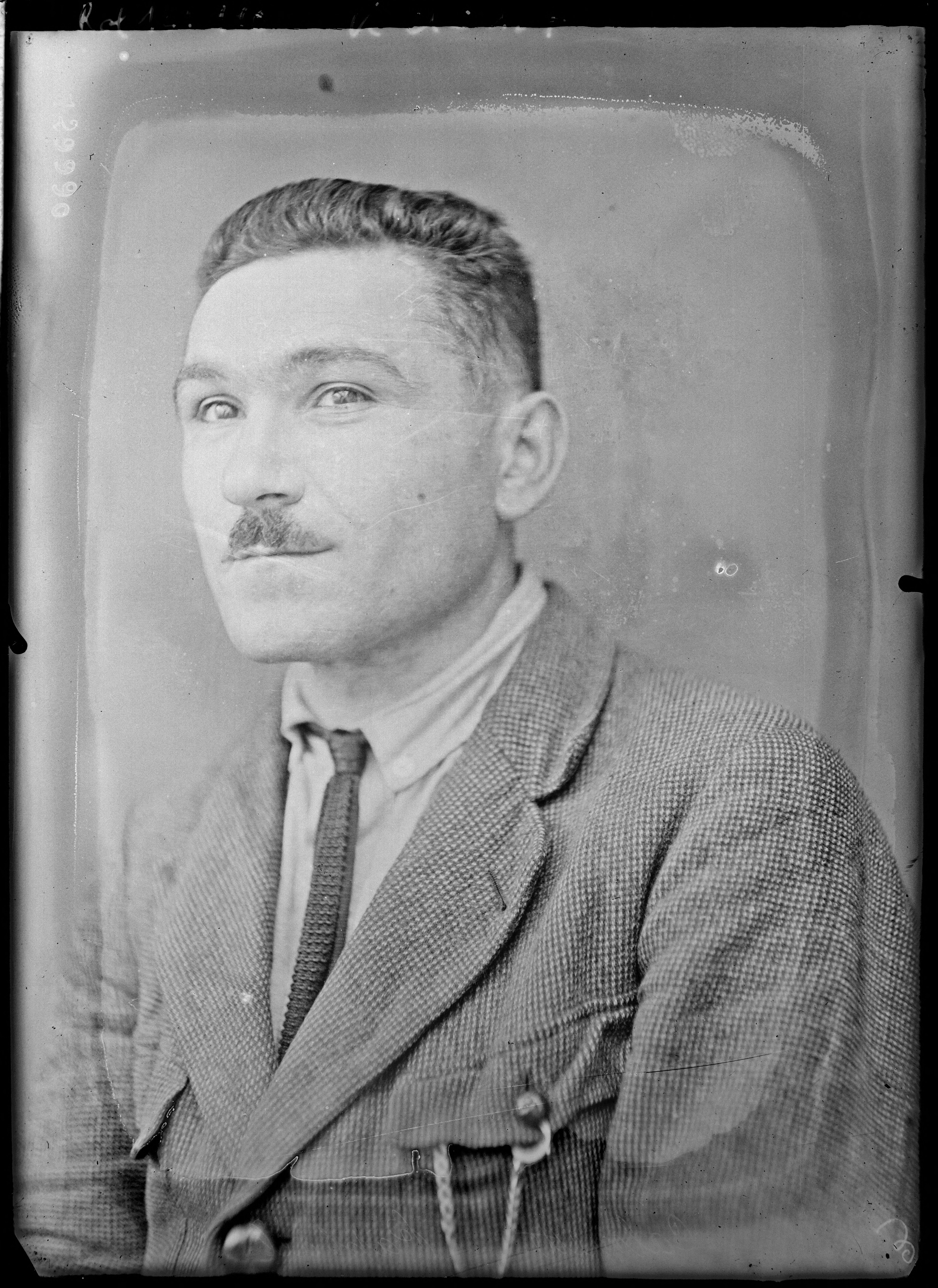
- Calmette in 1928

Personal information
- Born: 7 July 1901
- Died: 17 March 1981 (aged 79)

Cycling career
- Sport: Cycling
- Discipline: Road
- Role: Rider

Raphaël Calmette (7 July 1901 – 17 March 1981) was a French racing cyclist. He rode in the 1928 Tour de France.
