= Marcel Colleu =

French cyclist

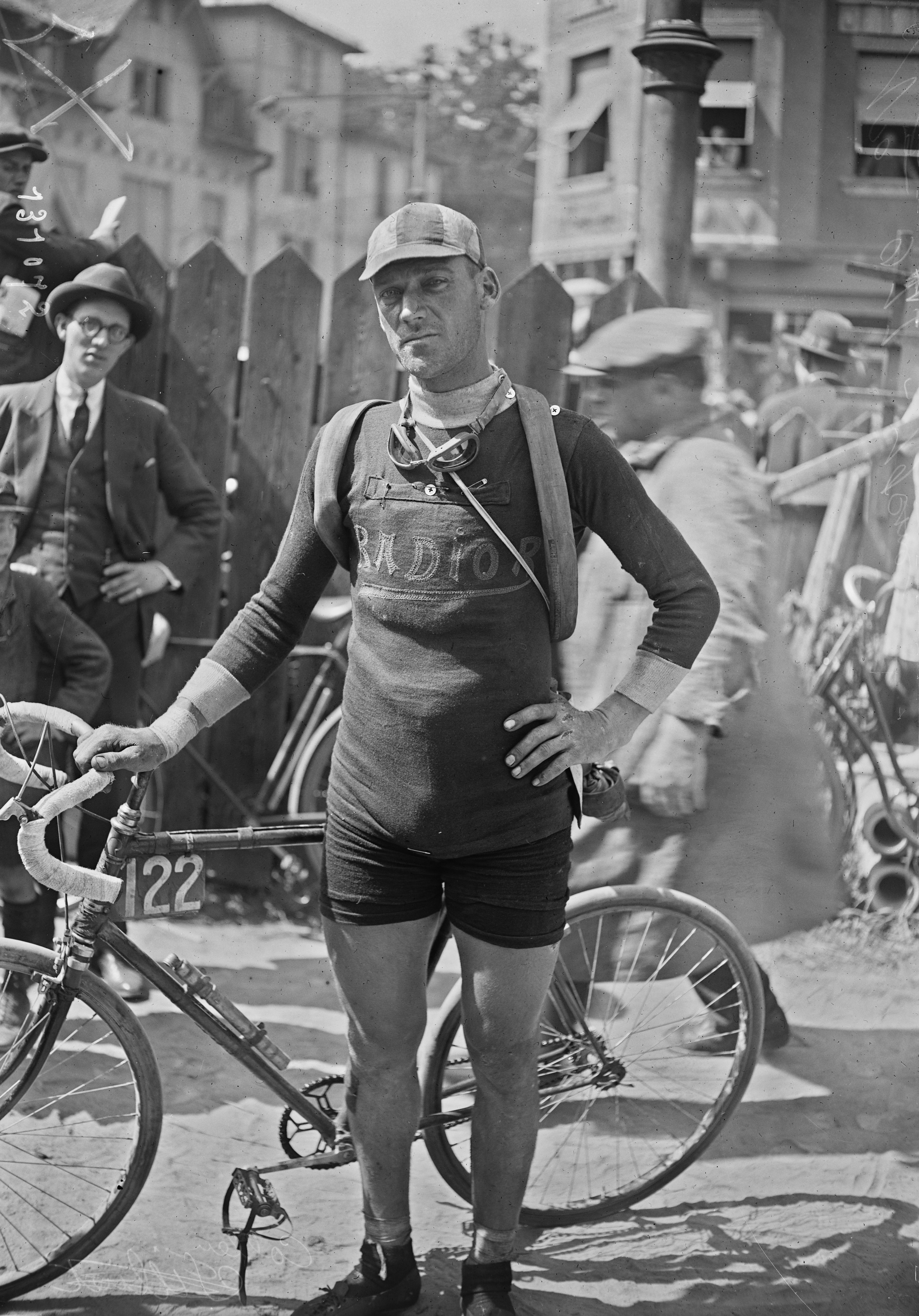
- Colleu at the 1928 Tour de France

Personal information
- Born: 8 February 1897 Évreux, France
- Died: 28 September 1973 (aged 76)
- Height: 1.68 m (5 ft 6 in)
- Weight: 59 kg (130 lb)

Cycling career
- Sport: Cycling
- Discipline: Road
- Role: Rider

Marcel Colleu (8 February 1897 – 28 September 1973) was a French racing cyclist. He rode in the 1925 and 1928 Tour de France.
