= Raphaël Dupau =

French cyclist

Personal information
- Born: 13 September 1900
- Died: 14 June 1971 (aged 70)

Cycling career
- Sport: Cycling
- Discipline: Road
- Role: Rider

Raphaël Dupau (13 September 1900 – 14 June 1971) was a French racing cyclist. He rode in the 1926 Tour de France.
