= Ravat–Wonder–Dunlop =

Ravat–Wonder–Dunlop was a cycling team formed for the 1928 Tour de France.

== Background ==
The Ravat–Wonder–Dunlop cycling team has its origins in the Dunlop Grand Prix that was held in Victoria, Australia, between 14 and 19 November 1927. The plan was to find a team and send it to European races. The Dunlop Grand Prix was decidedly won by Hubert Opperman. He was asked to write an article for The Sporting Globe and he credited New Zealand rider Harry Watson, and fellow Australians Ernest Bainbridge and Percy Osborn in that article for helping make the race what it was. These were the riders selected to travel with him to France. Opperman was made captain—he was chosen by the riders themselves—but the team was more egalitarian than was traditional for European teams with their domestiques clearly in a sub-ordinate role. The Australasian team instead decided that they would help each other so they could ideally all finish the race.

The initiative for sending the team came from The Sporting Globe in conjunction with The Melbourne Herald; the newspapers acted upon a suggestion made by the Victorian manager of the Dunlop Rubber Company, Stan Lough, at a dinner given for Opperman's win of the Dunlop Grand Prix. The moment that Henri Desgrange, the organiser of the Tour de France, cabled the acceptance of the Australasian team, the fund-raising effort began. Whilst the initiative was a national one, all three Australian riders were from Victoria and outside of the state, there was apathy as far as fund-raising was concerned.

In New Zealand, The Sun was driving the effort; the initially Christchurch-based newspaper had just started publishing in Auckland, too. Fund-raising was also undertaken by the Athletic and Cycling Union for Watson. And as soon as Watson returned to New Zealand, races were held with the surplus going towards his expenses. The first such race was at English Park on 24 December 1927. Another fund-raising race was held at English Park on 4 February 1928. And a few days later on 8 February, a race meeting was held at the Caledonian Ground in Dunedin. In all these races, Watson competed—amongst others—against Phil O'Shea. Watson was trained by O'Shea (born 1889), himself a legend on the bike. O'Shea had a long career and competed from 1909 to 1932. If enough funds could be raised, O'Shea was to accompany the team to France, but this was not achieved and he stayed behind in New Zealand. A similar initiative was pursued in Koo Wee Rup in Victoria, where funds were raised to get the 1926 winner of the Melbourne to Warrnambool cycle race and fourth at the Dunlop Grand Prix—Les Einsiedel—to accompany the team; again, this came to nothing.

The committee in charge of organising the team comprised Norman Broomhall (president of the Australasian Federal Cycling Council) as chairman, W. Smith (president of the League of Victorian Wheelmen), A. D. Mc. Heywood (honorary secretary of the League of Victorian Wheelmen), Charles Brown Kellow (as a representative of the sporting public), J. M. Cross (handicapper of the League of Victorian Wheelmen), W. R. Forster (editor of The Sporting Globe and sporting editor of The Herald), and J. J. Maher (cycling editor of The Herald and The Sporting Globe). Kellow nominated businessman Bert Watson as his deputy on the committee.

On 16 February 1928, Watson left by SS Manuka from Lyttelton via Wellington to Melbourne. In Melbourne, there were more races for fund-raising purposes and the four team members were fitted with blazers, caps and jerseys. The jerseys were emblazoned with national symbols of Australia and New Zealand: a wattle leaf and a kiwi. As part of a send-off party, the team was hosted at the Tivoli Theatre, where a movie of the Dunlop Grand Prix was shown.

Osborne left Melbourne on the East-West express for Fremantle on 5 March 1928; the committee had agreed for him to appear in a promotional activity for the opening of their new Fremantle Cyclodrome. The other three riders left Melbourne the following days on the RMS Otranto.
