= Paul Filliat =

French cyclist

Personal information
- Born: 8 November 1899 Viriat, Ain, France
- Died: 12 December 1981 (aged 82)

Cycling career
- Sport: Cycling
- Discipline: Road
- Role: Rider

Paul Filliat (8 November 1899 – 12 December 1981) was a French racing cyclist. He rode in the 1926 Tour de France.
