= Marcel Godard =

French cyclist (1888–1966)

Personal information
- Born: 9 April 1888
- Died: 9 September 1966 (aged 78)

Cycling career
- Sport: Cycling
- Role: Rider

Marcel Godard (9 April 1888 – 9 September 1966) was a French racing cyclist. He rode in the 1920 Tour de France.
