= Jean Mouveroux =

French cyclist (1902–1988)

Personal information
- Born: 5 April 1902
- Died: 15 March 1988 (aged 85)

Cycling career
- Sport: Cycling
- Discipline: Road
- Role: Rider

Jean Mouveroux (5 April 1902 – 15 March 1988) was a French racing cyclist. He rode in the 1928 Tour de France.
