= Désiré Louesse =

Belgian cyclist

Personal information
- Born: 23 January 1898
- Died: 29 April 1960 (aged 62)

Cycling career
- Sport: Cycling
- Discipline: Road
- Role: Rider

Désiré Louesse (23 January 1898 – 29 April 1960) was a Belgian racing cyclist. He rode in the 1928 Tour de France.
