= Kennett Bros =

New Zealand trio of brothers and mountain bikers

The Kennett Bros is the business name for brothers Paul Kennett, Simon Kennett and Jonathan Kennett. They have been heavily involved in mountain biking in New Zealand since 1984, and in publishing books about cycling and cyclists. They were inducted into the Mountain Bike Hall of Fame in 2018.

== Activities ==
Paul organised the first national mountain bike race in New Zealand in 1986 – the Karapoti Classic. The Kennett Bros continued to run this annually until 2002, when they sold the event.

In 1997 they co-organised a round of the UCI Mountain Bike World Cup in Wellington.

In 1998 they started building the Wellington City Council owned Makara Peak Mountain Bike Park, which received a national recreation award in 2002 and a national conservation award in 2003.

From 2001 to 2006 the Kennett Bros coordinated a forest revegetation project at Ōtari-Wilton's Bush, in which 40,000 trees were planted over a five-year period.

The Kennett Bros helped organise the 2006 Rotorua UCI Mountain Bike & Trials World Championships.

From 2010 to 2014 the Kennett Bros were a project manager on the New Zealand Cycle Trail.

== Publishing ==
Paul ran a national mountain bike magazine called Mountain Bike New Zealand Magazine from 1988 to 1990.

In 1991 the Kennett Bros wrote the first edition of Classic New Zealand Mountain Bike Rides, a national guidebook, which became a best seller. They produce new editions every three years (1993, 1996, 1999, 2002, 2005, 2008, 2011, 2014, 2017, 2019). In 2019 they announced that the tenth (2019) edition would be the last in the series.

In 1995 Paul launched the Mountain Bike New Zealand Web, the online home for many New Zealand mountain bikers.

In 2004 they published a history of cycling in New Zealand called RIDE: The Story of Cycling in New Zealand.

From 2005 to 2019 they published a series of seven books on influential New Zealand cyclists called the New Zealand Cycling Legend Series.

== Recognition ==
In 2018, the Kennett Brothers were inducted into the Mountain Bike Hall of Fame.

Survive Aotearoa, co-authored by Bronwen Wall and Jonathan Kennett in 2025, was a finalist for the Elsie Locke Award for Non-Fiction in the 2026 New Zealand Book Awards for Children and Young Adults.

== Publications ==
- Classic New Zealand Mountain Bike Rides (1991 to 2019) – ISBN 978-0-9941454-3-7 (tenth edition)
- RIDE: The Story of Cycling in New Zealand (2004) – ISBN 0-9583490-7-X
- Phil O'Shea: Wizard on Wheels (New Zealand Cycling Legends 01) by Jonathan Kennett & Bronwen Wall (2005) – ISBN 0-9583490-8-8
- Harry Watson: the Mile Eater (New Zealand Cycling Legends 02) by Jonathan Kennett, Bronwen Wall & Ian Gray (2006) – ISBN 0-9582673-1-6
- Bill Pratney: Never say die (New Zealand Cycling Legends 03) by Jim Robinson (2007) – ISBN 978-0-9582673-2-8
- Warwick Dalton: the Lone Eagle (New Zealand Cycling Legends 04) by John Rhodes and Jonathan Kennett (2008) – ISBN 978-0-9582673-4-2
- Tino Tabak: Dreams & Demons of a New Zealand Cycling Legend (New Zealand Cycling Legends 05) by Jonathan Kennett (2009) – ISBN 978-0-9582673-5-9
- Louise Sutherland: Spinning The Globe (New Zealand Cycling Legends 06) by Bronwen Wall (2010) – ISBN 978-0-9864641-0-2
- Classic New Zealand Road Rides Jonathan Kennett and Kieran Turner (2010) – ISBN 978-0-9582673-8-0
- The Muddy Olympians (New Zealand Cycling Legends 07) by Simon and Jonathan Kennett (2012) – ISBN 978-0-9864641-4-0
- Classic New Zealand Cycle Trails by The Kennett Brothers (2012 to 2021) – ISBN 978-0-9951376-9-1 (fifth edition)
- Beginners Guide to Road and Track Cycling by Ian Grey and Jonathan Kennett (2015) – ISBN 978-0-9941189-5-0
- Short Easy Bike Rides by The Kennett Brothers (2015, 2018) – ISBN 978-0-9941454-6-8 (second edition)
- Tour Aotearoa Official Guide by The Kennett Brothers (2016 to 2021) – ISBN 978-0-9951376-5-3 (fourth edition)
- Tour Aotearoa: NZs 3000 km Bikepacking Odyssey by Jonathan Kennett (2016) – ISBN 978-0-9941189-8-1
- Explore! Aotearoa by Bronwen Wall (2017) – ISBN 978-0-9941454-0-6
- The Swart Brothers (New Zealand Cycling Legends 08) by Russell Jones (2019) – ISBN 978-0-9941454-7-5
- Kopiko Aotearoa Official Guide – West to East by Jonathan Kennett and Erik Westra (2020) – ISBN 978-0-9951376-2-2
- Kopiko Aotearoa Official Guide – East to West by Jonathan Kennett and Erik Westra (2020) – ISBN 978-0-9951376-0-8
- Bikepacking Aotearoa by The Kennett Brothers (2020, 2021) – ISBN 978-0-9951376-8-4 (second edition)
- Survive Aotearoa by Bronwen Wall and Jonathan Kennett (2025) - ISBN 978-1-7386253-5-2
