= Jan Mertens (cyclist) =

Belgian cyclist

Personal information
- Born: 2 March 1904 Hoboken, Antwerp
- Died: 21 June 1964 (aged 60)

Cycling career
- Sport: Cycling
- Discipline: Road
- Role: Rider

Professional teams
- 1926-1927: Labor-Dunlop
- 1928: Thomann-Dunlop
- 1928: Securitas
- 1929-1930: Alcyon-Dunlop

Major wins
- One-day races and Classics Tour of Flanders (1928) Schaal Sels (1926)

Jan Mertens (2 March 1904 in Hoboken, Antwerp – 21 June 1964) was a Belgian cyclist. Professional from 1926 to 1931, he won the Tour of Flanders in 1928 and ranked fourth in the Tour de France in 1928.

== Major results ==
1922

3rd of Binche–Chimay–Binche

1924

3rd of the Belgian National Road Race Championships independents

1925

3rd of the Tour of Belgium independents

1926

Schaal Sels-Merksem
2nd of Scheldeprijs

1927

2nd stage of the Tour of Belgium

1928

Tour of Flanders
3rd of Scheldeprijs
4th overall of the Tour de France

== Results in the Tour de France ==
- 1926: 26th
- 1928: 4th
- 1930: 15th
