= Victor Fontan =

French cyclist

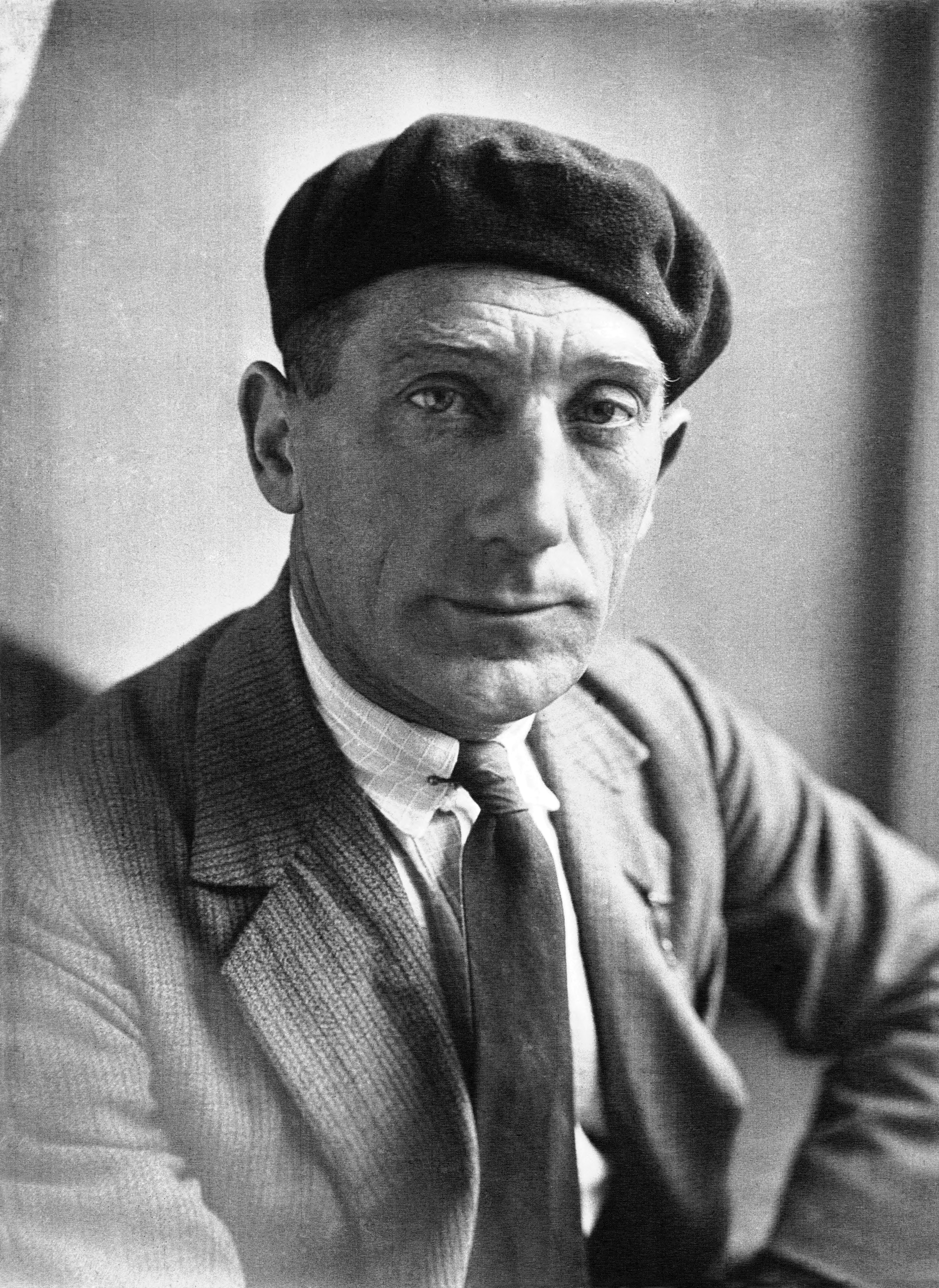

Personal information
- Full name: Victor Fontan
- Born: 18 June 1892 Pau, France
- Died: 2 January 1982 (aged 89)

Cycling career
- Sport: Cycling
- Discipline: Road
- Role: Rider
- Rider type: Climber

Amateur team
- 1910–1912: –

Professional teams
- 1913–1929: –
- 1928–1929: Elvish-Wolber

Victor Fontan (born Pau, France, 18 June 1892, died Saint-Vincent 2 January 1982) was a French cyclist who led the 1929 Tour de France but dropped out after knocking at doors at night to ask for another bicycle. His plight led to a change of rules to prevent its happening again. He was also one of three riders who all wore the yellow jersey of leadership on the same day, the only time it has happened.

== Background ==
Victor Fontan was born in Pau but moved to the neighbouring commune of Nay, Pyrénées-Atlantiques when young. His father was a clog-maker. Fontan married a local girl, Jeanne Larquey, but couldn't go out with her without a chaperone, the mother of Marcel Triep-Capdeville, later mayor of Nay. The couple had a son, Francis, who became a heart surgeon in Bordeaux, and a daughter, Gaby, a teacher in Pau. Fontan spent his early career in local races near the Pyrenees He raced from 1910, became a professional in 1913, then fought in the first world war. He was shot twice in one leg. On demobilisation in 1920 he started racing again and became the best rider in the south-west. He was reluctant to race far from home, which made him unattractive to national sponsors.

== Tour de France ==
=== 1924: an individual entrant ===
Fontan rode the 1924 Tour de France as an individual entrant, but he did not finish. He was assumed to already be too old for such intense competition, plus being handicapped by being less known outside the south-west.

=== 1928: a win in the mountains ===
He rode the 1928 race for a local sponsor, the Elvish bicycle company. His team was so poor that he lost time looking after the others. He could not leave them to themselves because the seven flat stages were run as team time trials, the organiser, Henri Desgrange still trying to find a way to stop riders taking much of each day steadily and racing only as they neared the finish. The American historian Bill McGann wrote:

Desgrange... wanted the Tour de France to be a contest where unrelenting individual effort in the cauldron of intense competition resulted in the supreme test of both the body and will of the athlete. Desgrange was convinced that the teams were combining to fix the outcome of the race. At the very best, even if they were honest, they helped a weaker rider do well. He also felt that on the flat stages the riders did not push themselves, saving their energy for the mountains.

The rule not only separated weak teams from the strong. It favoured weak riders who could be pulled along by stronger team-mates and handicapped strong riders, like Fontan, slowed by having too few good riders to share the pace-making. Only when individual racing was allowed as the Tour approached the mountains could Fontan ride at his own level. He won the stage from Les Sables d'Olonne that took the field within distance of the Pyrenees at Bordeaux. The Pyrenees were his local climbs but he was so far behind the leaders – 1h 45m – that the favourites disregarded him when he raced off alone from Hendaye, on the Spanish border, to Luchon. He took seven minutes on Nicolas Frantz of Luxembourg.

Fontan finished seventh in Paris, 5h 7m 47s behind Frantz, who had led from beginning to end. But deduct the time by which Fontan had been delayed by his team compared to the strength of Frantz's Alcyon team and the positions could have been reversed.

=== 1929: distress of the yellow jersey ===
The 1929 Tour de France had 22 stages, the longest over 366 km, and lasted 5,257 km. (Note: Some accounts state that the 1929 Tour was 29 km longer, at 5,286 km instead of 5,257 km.) Team time-trials were dropped for all but three stages, except as a threat should any stage be ridden at less than 30 km/h. Fontan rode as an individual entrant. Freed of looking after others, he received the yellow jersey as leader of the general classification at Bordeaux, where he had won a stage the previous year. A unique problem faced the organisers because Frantz and André Leducq had been in the same leading group and all three had the same elapsed time. For the only time in the Tour de France, the yellow jersey was given to three riders on the same day. (Note: Three riders sharing the yellow jersey was a situation that Desgrange hadn't imagined, his riders usually being separated by hours rather than seconds. Rules were introduced to establish tie-breaks, precedence for riders with the same time.)

The novelty lasted only a day. Gaston Rebry escaped next day with two others and took the lead, although the three previous leaders were now equal second. A day later, Fontan was back in the lead. He wore the yellow jersey again for a stage of 323 km that started before sunrise. He rode seven kilometres and then fell. Some accounts say he rode into a gutter, others that he was knocked off by a dog. The fall broke his front forks and the rest of the race rode by. Fontan was entitled to ride a replacement bike but only if he could show the irreparable damage to judges.

The judges had passed and Fontan had no second bike. He reached a village and walked from house to house, knocking on doors before dawn to ask for one. When a villager obliged, Fontan set off through the Pyrenees with his broken bicycle on his back. Eventually it became too much and he gave up at 6am. He sat by a village fountain at Saint-Gaudens and sobbed. It was the first Tour to be covered by radio and he was found there by Jean Antoine and Alex Virot of L'Intransigeant, who were broadcasting for Radio Cité. The recording of Fontan's sobbing was broadcast a little less than two hours after it had happened and led Louis Delblat of Les Echos des Sports to write:

How can a man lose the Tour de France because of an accident to his bike? I can't understand it. The rule should be changed so that a rider with no chance of winning can give his bike to his leader, or there should be a car with several spare bicycles. You lose the Tour de France when you find someone better than you are. You don't lose it through a stupid accident to your machine. Next year Desgrange modified the rules. (Note: In 1930 Henri Desgrange changed the rules about spare bicycles, and he revamped almost everything else as well. In 1929 the race was won by Maurice De Waele, even though he was sick. Fellow Alcyon riders had paced him to the end, which was against the rules. Desgrange had fought a long war with team sponsors, who urged their riders to race as a team rather than rivals as the rules insisted. "My race has been won by a corpse", Desgrange protested, and next year he told sponsored teams to stay away and ran the Tour for teams representing their country. In that way he also accepted team racing, which let riders exchange bicycles between themselves.)

== Retirement and memorial ==
Fontan rode the Tour in the French national team in 1930, after Desgrange had done away with sponsored teams (see note below). He was too old to make a difference and he retired to run a transport business. He is commemorated by a plaque on his house in the place de la République, at Nay, close to La Maison Carree. He is buried with his son Francis in the cemetery across the river Gave. The former mayor, Maurice Triep-Capdeville, said the region turned out climbers, like Fontan and Raymond Mastrotto, rather than sprinters.

You have to acknowledge that the sprints are dangerous. You have to have vista, be crafty. But the mountains, they're the big face-to-face. They put the finish at the top of mountains because, up there, there is no pity. Without them, it would be a Flemish kermesse!

== Major results ==
1926
1st, Overall, Volta a Catalunya

1st, Stages 2, 4 and 5

1927
1st, Overall, Volta a Catalunya

1st, Stages 3 and 8

1st, Overall, Tour of the Basque Country

1st, Stage 3

1928
4th, Overall, Giro d'Italia
7th, Overall, Tour de France

1st, Stages 7 & 9

1929
Did not finish, Tour de France
