= Marcel Huot =

French cyclist

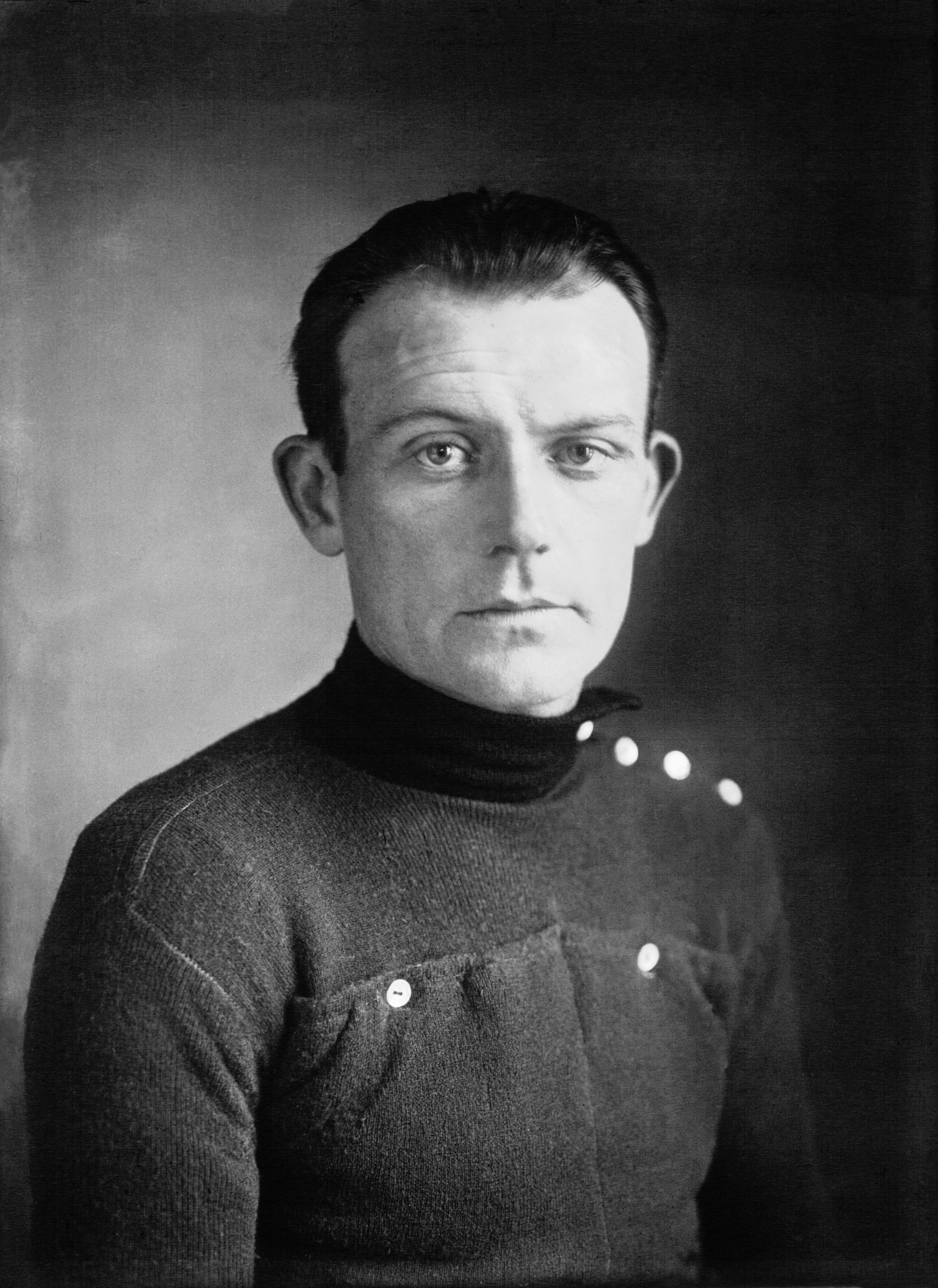

Personal information
- Full name: Marcel Huot
- Born: 9 September 1896 Épernay, France
- Died: 23 April 1954 (aged 57) Pantin, France

Cycling career
- Sport: Cycling
- Discipline: Road
- Role: Rider

Major wins
- One stage 1928 Tour de France

Marcel Huot (Épernay, 9 September 1896 — Pantin, 23 April 1954) was a French professional road bicycle racer, who won one stage in the 1928 Tour de France.

== Major results ==
1923
Tour de France:

10th place overall classification

1928
Tour de France:

Winner stage 19
9th place overall classification
