= Camille Van De Casteele =

Belgian cyclist

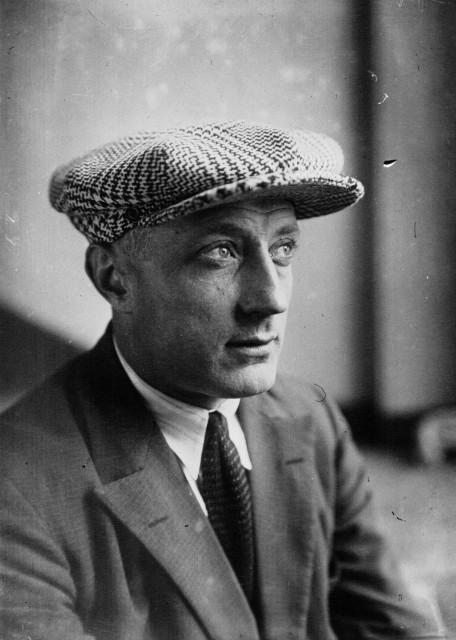

Personal information
- Full name: Camille Van De Casteele
- Born: 27 June 1902 Sint-Andries, Belgium
- Died: 12 February 1961 (aged 58) Bruges, Belgium

Cycling career
- Sport: Cycling
- Discipline: Road
- Role: Rider

Camille Van De Casteele (Sint-Andries, 27 June 1902 – Bruges, 12 February 1961) was a Belgian professional road bicycle racer.

== Major results ==
1925
Paris–Caen
1926
Omloop der Leiestreek
Paris–Caen
Tour de France:

Winner stage 16

1927
Tour de France:

Winner stage 4
