= Jean Bidot =

French cyclist

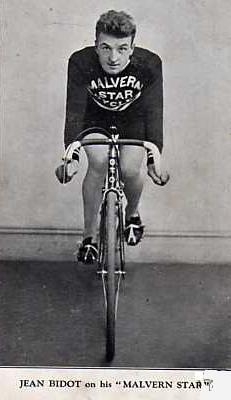
- Jean Bidot in Australia for the Sydney to Melbourne

Personal information
- Full name: Jean Bidot
- Born: 23 January 1905 Saint-Germain-en-Laye, France
- Died: 17 October 1986 (aged 81) Paris

Cycling career
- Sport: Cycling
- Discipline: Road
- Role: Rider

Professional teams
- 1927-1928: Alcyon - Dunlop
- 1928: Alleluia - Wolber
- 1929: La Française-Diamant-Dunlop
- 1930-1933: Alcyon - Dunlop
- 1934-1936: Helyett - Hutchinson
- 1935-1937: Genial Lucifer - Hutchinson
- 1935: Essor - Hutchinson
- 1939: Génial Lucifer - Hutchinson
- 1939; 1946: Terrot - Hutchinson

Managerial team
- 1950-1951: French road cycling team

Jean Bidot (1905 – 1986) was a French professional cyclist from 1926 to 1939 and was nicknamed the "Strategist". Winner of the Criterium des Aiglons in 1926, aged 21, he won the Circuit de Paris in 1928. In 1929 he was second in the French national road championship behind his brother Marcel. In 1930 traveled to Australia, finishing 3rd in the Sydney to Melbourne and the Tour of Tasmania.In 1931 he won Paris-Belfort and Paris-Vichy, a race he won again in 1932, along with Paris-Angers. In 1933, he won the circuit of Deux-Sèvres. Bidot won the Tour de Vaucluse in 1934 and 1935. He managed the French team in 1950 and 1951.

== Racing ==
Jean Bidot professional career commenced in 1926 by winning the Criterium des Aiglons, a race reserved for professional riders under 30 who had not yet won a major race. He finished in 2nd place the following year by winning the first stage of the race. In 1928, he won the Circuit de Paris, was 3rd in the Circuit de Champagne and Paris-Le Havre and participated in his first Tour de France where he finished 22nd overall and in second place in the last stage in Paris.

In 1930 Bidot traveled to Australia with Joseph Mauclair to compete in two stage races, the Sydney to Melbourne covering 700 miles (1,100 km) and the Tour of Tasmania covering 303 miles (488 km). Bidot finished 3rd behind Mauclair and Hubert Opperman in the Sydney to Melbourne and 3rd behind Opperman and Mauclair in the Tour of Tasmania where he won the second stage.

He had two victories in 1931, winning Paris-Belfort and Paris-Vichy. He won Paris-Vichy again the following year, as well as Paris-Angers. In 1933, he won Paris-Troyes and twice won the Tour de Vaucluse in 1934 and 1935.

== Management ==
Jean Bidot managed the French national team in 1950 and 1951. France insisted that the managers of its national teams had no interest in any of the riders' sponsors so when he accepted a job with the Simplex derailleur company, he had to give up managing the team. His brother Marcel took his place in 1952.

== Major results ==
1926
1st Critérium des Aiglons
1927
Critérium des Aiglons

1st stage 1
2nd overall

1928
1st Circuit de Paris
3rd Circuit de Champagne
3rd Paris-Le Havre
22nd Tour de France
1929
2nd French national road championship
10th championnat du monde sur route
1930
3rd Sydney to Melbourne
Tour of Tasmania

1st stage 2
3rd overall

1931
1st Paris-Belfort
1st Paris-Vichy
2nd Paris-Laigle
Tour de France abandoned stage 12
1932
1st Paris-Angers
1st Paris-Vichy
1st Poitiers - Saumur - Poitiers
3rd Paris-Belfort
1933
1st Paris-Troyes
1st Belfort - Strasbourg - Belfort
3rd Critérium national
1934
Tour du Vaucluse
1st Paris-Bourganeuf
3rd Circuit du Morbihan
35th Tour de France
1935
1st Tour du Vaucluse
1936
2nd Paris-Troyes
2nd Paris-Limoges
1937
3rd Paris-Nantes
