= Joseph Mauclair =

French cyclist

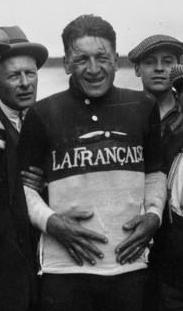

Personal information
- Full name: Joseph Mauclair
- Born: 9 March 1906 Clichy, France
- Died: 5 February 1990 (aged 83) Créteil, France

Cycling career
- Sport: Cycling
- Discipline: Road
- Role: Rider

Professional teams
- 1927-1928: Armor-Dunlop
- 1929: La Française-Diamant
- 1930: Colin-Wolber
- 1931: JB Louvet
- 1931: Lutetia-Wolber
- 1931: Chemineau-Wolber
- 1932: Armor-Dunlop
- 1932: Helyett-Hutchinson
- 1933: Dei
- 1933: France Sport-Wolber
- 1934: Automoto-Hutchinson
- 1935: Essor-Hutchinson
- 1935-1938: Helyett-Hutchinson

Major wins
- One stage 1928 Tour de France

Joseph Mauclair (Clichy, 9 March 1906 — Créteil, 5 February 1990) was a French professional road bicycle racer from 1927 to 1938, who won the 17th stage in the 1928 Tour de France. In 1930 traveled to Australia with Jean Bidot to compete in two stage races, the Sydney to Melbourne covering 700 miles (1,100 km) and the Tour of Tasmania covering 303 miles (488 km). Mauclair won stage 2 of the Sydney to Melbourne and won the general classification ahead of Hubert Opperman and Bidot. He won the first stage of the Tour of Tasmanaia and finished 2nd in the general classification behind Opperman with Bidot finishing 3rd.

== Major results ==
1926
1st final of Etoiles de France cyclistes
4th Paris-Reims
1927
3rd Paris-Arras
1928
Tour de France

1st stage 17
2nd stage 21
11th General classification

1st criterium des Algions
2nd Paris-Bourganeuf
3rd Paris-Caen
1929
2nd Brussels-Paris
2nd Circuit du Jura
10th Tour de Catalogne
1930
Tour de France abandoned stage 9
Sydney-Melbourne

1st stage 2
1st general classification

Tour of Tasmania

1st stage 1
2nd stages 2 & 3
2nd general classification

2nd Paris-Nancy
1931
1st stage 4 Tour d'Allemagne
27th general classification Tour de France
1932
Tour de France abandoned stage 5
1933
Nice-Toulon

1st stages 1 & 2
1st general classification

1st Paris-Belfort
3rd Paris-Caen
1934
3rd stage 3 Paris-Nice
1935
1st Paris-Sedan
Tour de France

3rd stage 12
19th general classification

1936
1st Paris-Belfort
1st Paris-Strasbourg
3rd Circuit du Jura
1937
1st Paris-Nantes
1948
9th Paris-Brest-Paris
