= List of teams and cyclists in the 1927 Tour de France =

List of cyclists

The 1927 Tour de France featured the first win by Nicolas Frantz, a cyclist from Luxembourg. Frantz had come in second in the previous tour, and went on to win the tour in 1928 as well. It also showcased the debuts of André Leducq (4th) and Antonin Magne (6th), two French riders who would win the Tour de France in coming years.

== Cyclists ==
=== By starting number ===
Legend
No.	Starting number worn by the rider during the Tour
Pos.	Position in the general classification
DNF	Denotes a rider who did not finish

No.	Name	Nationality	Team	Pos.	Ref
1	Nicolas Frantz	Luxembourg	Alcyon-Dunlop	1	
2	Marcel Bidot	France	Alcyon-Dunlop	DNF	
3	Adelin Benoît	Belgium	Alcyon-Dunlop	5	
4	Gaston Rebry	Belgium	Alcyon-Dunlop	DNF	
5	Jean Debusschere	Belgium	Alcyon-Dunlop	13	
6	Pierre Bachellerie	France	Alcyon-Dunlop	DNF	
7	André Leducq	France	Thomann-Dunlop	4	
8	René Hamel	France	Thomann-Dunlop	DNF	
9	Julien Vervaecke	Belgium	Armor-Dunlop	3	
10	Louis Muller	Belgium	Armor-Dunlop	12	
11	Maurice De Waele	Belgium	Labor-Dunlop	2	
12	Louis De Lannoy	Belgium	Labor-Dunlop	16	
13	Gustaaf Van Slembrouck	Belgium	JB Louvet	14	
14	Hector Martin	Belgium	JB Louvet	9	
15	Odile Tailleu	Belgium	JB Louvet	DNF	
16	Camille Van De Casteele	Belgium	JB Louvet	DNF	
17	Pé Verhaegen	Belgium	JB Louvet	7	
18	Eugène Greau	France	JB Louvet	DNF	
19	Raymond Decorte	Belgium	JB Louvet	11	
20	Maurice Geldhof	Belgium	JB Louvet	10	
21	Georges Brosteaux	Belgium	JB Louvet	DNF	
22	Raoul Petouille	France	JB Louvet	DNF	
23	Joseph Hemelsoet	Belgium	JB Louvet	17	
25	Julien Moineau	France	Alleluia-Wolber	8	
26	Marius Gallottini	Italy	Alleluia-Wolber	DNF	
27	Antonin Magne	France	Alleluia-Wolber	6	
28	Pierre Magne	France	Alleluia-Wolber	15	
29	André Devauchelle	France	Alleluia-Wolber	26	
30	André Cauet	France	Alleluia-Wolber	DNF	
31	Francis Pélissier	France	Dilecta-Wolber	DNF	
32	Ferdinand Le Drogo	France	Dilecta-Wolber	DNF	
33	Paul Le Drogo	France	Dilecta-Wolber	DNF	
34	Georges Cuvelier	France	Dilecta-Wolber	DNF	
35	Arsène Alancourt	France	Dilecta-Wolber	DNF	
36	Marcel Huot	France	Dilecta-Wolber	DNF	
37	Honoré Barthélémy	France	Dilecta-Wolber	DNF	
38	Louis-André Schaffner	France	Dilecta-Wolber	DNF	
102	Urbain Comitis	France	Touriste-routier	DNF	
103	André Drobecq	France	Touriste-routier	37	
104	Lucien Prudhomme	France	Touriste-routier	DNF	
105	Léopold Gelot	France	Touriste-routier	DNF	
107	Alfred Louchet	France	Touriste-routier	DNF	
110	Baptistin Mousset	France	Touriste-routier	DNF	
112	Albert Courtot	France	Touriste-routier	DNF	
114	Arthur Rechaux	France	Touriste-routier	DNF	
115	Gaston Corbiere	France	Touriste-routier	DNF	
116	André Mazziotta	France	Touriste-routier	DNF	
117	Henri Lintzen	Belgium	Touriste-routier	DNF	
119	Jules Deloffre	France	Touriste-routier	DNF	
122	Théodore Vignes	France	Touriste-routier	DNF	
123	Léon Jacacier	France	Touriste-routier	DNF	
125	Giuseppe Ercolani	Italy	Touriste-routier	DNF	
126	Jules Gillard	Switzerland	Touriste-routier	DNF	
127	Antoine Giacomasso	France	Touriste-routier	DNF	
129	Paul Duboc	France	Touriste-routier	DNF	
131	Jean Berton	France	Touriste-routier	DNF	
132	André Dupont	France	Touriste-routier	DNF	
134	Kisso Kawamuro	Japan	Touriste-routier	DNF	
135	Edouard Delcayre	France	Touriste-routier	DNF	
136	Yvon Pascoli	Italy	Touriste-routier	DNF	
137	Alfredo Francini	Italy	Touriste-routier	DNF	
138	Robert Beaulieu	France	Touriste-routier	DNF	
140	Florimond Guillain	France	Touriste-routier	DNF	
141	Adrien Alpini	France	Touriste-routier	DNF	
142	Jacques Pfister	France	Touriste-routier	38	
143	Luigi Simioni	Italy	Touriste-routier	DNF	
144	André Peton	France	Touriste-routier	DNF	
146	Arthur Claerhout	Belgium	Touriste-routier	DNF	
147	Guilbert Bled	France	Touriste-routier	DNF	
148	Maurice Arnoult	France	Touriste-routier	21	
149	Henri Catelan	France	Touriste-routier	DNF	
150	Henri Touzard	France	Touriste-routier	19	
151	Charles Hennuyer	France	Touriste-routier	DNF	
152	Giuseppe Pusterla	Italy	Touriste-routier	DNF	
153	Léon Martin	Belgium	Touriste-routier	DNF	
154	Henri Parol Gottrand	France	Touriste-routier	DNF	
155	Jean Thilges	France	Touriste-routier	DNF	
156	Simeon Vergnol	France	Touriste-routier	DNF	
157	Jean Marius	France	Touriste-routier	DNF	
158	Valentin Izabal	France	Touriste-routier	DNF	
159	Marcel Gendrin	France	Touriste-routier	30	
160	Battista Ghiano	France	Touriste-routier	DNF	
161	Jules Nempon	France	Touriste-routier	35	
163	Giovanni Rossignoli	Italy	Touriste-routier	32	
164	Giovanni Canova	France	Touriste-routier	25	
165	Émile Druz	France	Touriste-routier	DNF	
167	Norbert Larose	France	Touriste-routier	DNF	
168	Emile Lambiel	Switzerland	Touriste-routier	DNF	
169	Georges De Beurmann	France	Touriste-routier	DNF	
170	Victor Berthy	France	Touriste-routier	DNF	
171	Charles Martinet	Switzerland	Touriste-routier	22	
172	Julien Drougard	France	Touriste-routier	DNF	
174	Jean-Roger Schwenter	France	Touriste-routier	DNF	
175	Ernest Langlais	France	Touriste-routier	DNF	
177	Edouard Teisseire	France	Touriste-routier	34	
178	Louis Gauthier	France	Touriste-routier	DNF	
179	Paul Millet	France	Touriste-routier	DNF	
180	André Léger	France	Touriste-routier	DNF	
182	Jean Zenon	France	Touriste-routier	DNF	
183	Francesco De Gioz	Italy	Touriste-routier	DNF	
184	Igo Colmaghi	Italy	Touriste-routier	DNF	
187	Fernand Moulet	France	Touriste-routier	DNF	
188	Camille Rolion	France	Touriste-routier	DNF	
189	Hector Leroy	Belgium	Touriste-routier	DNF	
190	Robert Asse	France	Touriste-routier	DNF	
191	Eugène Dhers	France	Touriste-routier	DNF	
192	Omer Mahy	Belgium	Touriste-routier	31	
193	Emile Lejeune	France	Touriste-routier	DNF	
194	Armand Goubert	France	Touriste-routier	36	
196	Henri Caron	France	Touriste-routier	DNF	
197	Edouard Petre	France	Touriste-routier	DNF	
199	Charles Krier	Luxembourg	Touriste-routier	27	
201	Camille Bière	France	Touriste-routier	DNF	
202	Maurice Coindeau	France	Touriste-routier	DNF	
203	Louis Andrey	France	Touriste-routier	DNF	
204	Georges Petit	France	Touriste-routier	DNF	
205	Léon Despontin	Belgium	Touriste-routier	28	
206	Auguste Dufour	France	Touriste-routier	DNF	
207	Lorenzo Fortuno	Italy	Touriste-routier	DNF	
208	Marius Rouvier	France	Touriste-routier	DNF	
209	Luigi Vertemati	Italy	Touriste-routier	DNF	
210	Victor Pellier	France	Touriste-routier	DNF	
211	Emile Faillu	France	Touriste-routier	DNF	
212	Guy Bariffi	Switzerland	Touriste-routier	DNF	
213	Alfred Neplaz	France	Touriste-routier	DNF	
214	Alexandre Neplaz	France	Touriste-routier	DNF	
216	Albert Jordens	Belgium	Touriste-routier	23	
217	Emilio Petiva	Italy	Touriste-routier	DNF	
218	Henry Tosseng	Luxembourg	Touriste-routier	DNF	
221	Egide Van Den Broeck	Belgium	Touriste-routier	DNF	
222	Constant Bach	France	Touriste-routier	DNF	
225	Kamiel Segers	Belgium	Touriste-routier	33	
227	Giuseppe Rivella	Italy	Touriste-routier	29	
228	José Pelletier	France	Touriste-routier	20	
230	Azeglio Terreni	Italy	Touriste-routier	DNF	
233	François Faillu	France	Touriste-routier	DNF	
235	Charles Guyot	Switzerland	Touriste-routier	DNF	
237	Ricardo Benasseni	Italy	Touriste-routier	DNF	
238	Pierre Claes	Belgium	Touriste-routier	39	
241	Secondo Martinetto	Italy	Touriste-routier	18	
242	François Menta	France	Touriste-routier	DNF	
244	Michele Gordini	Italy	Touriste-routier	24	
