= List of teams and cyclists in the 1928 Tour de France =

List of cyclists

The 1928 Tour de France was the 22nd tour and featured the first appearance of an Australian-New Zealand team, indicating the beginning of a more international sporting field.

Tour director Henri Desgrange allowed teams to replace exhausted or injured cyclist by new cyclists, to give the weaker teams a fairer chance. However, the effects were opposite, so the concept was quickly abandoned.

== By starting number ==
Legend
No.	Starting number worn by the rider during the Tour
Pos.	Position in the general classification
DNF	Denotes a rider who did not finish

No.	Name	Nationality	Team	Pos.	Ref
1	Nicolas Frantz	Luxembourg	Alcyon-Dunlop	1	
2	André Leducq	France	Alcyon-Dunlop	2	
3	Maurice De Waele	Belgium	Alcyon-Dunlop	3	
4	Gaston Rebry	Belgium	Alcyon-Dunlop	12	
5	Ernest Neuhard	France	Alcyon-Dunlop	DNF	
6	Désiré Louesse	Belgium	Alcyon-Dunlop	19	
7	Julien Vervaecke	Belgium	Armor-Dunlop	5	
8	Louis De Lannoy	Belgium	Armor-Dunlop	13	
9	Joseph Mauclair	France	Armor-Dunlop	11	
10	Jan Mertens	Belgium	Thomann-Dunlop	4	
11	Hector Martin	Belgium	JB Louvet-Hutchinson	DNF	
12	Pé Verhaegen	Belgium	JB Louvet-Hutchinson	16	
13	Maurice Geldhof	Belgium	JB Louvet-Hutchinson	DNF	
14	Raymond Decorte	Belgium	JB Louvet-Hutchinson	24	
15	Odile Tailleu	Belgium	JB Louvet-Hutchinson	20	
16	Denis Verschueren	Belgium	JB Louvet-Hutchinson	DNF	
17	Charles Meunier	Belgium	JB Louvet-Hutchinson	DNF	
18	Camille Van De Casteele	Belgium	JB Louvet-Hutchinson	14	
19	Joseph Hemelsoet	Belgium	JB Louvet-Hutchinson	DNF	
20	René Hamel	France	JB Louvet-Hutchinson	32	
21	Antonin Magne	France	Alleluia-Wolber	6	
22	Julien Moineau	France	Alleluia-Wolber	17	
23	Marcel Bidot	France	Alleluia-Wolber	8	
24	Jean Bidot	France	Alleluia-Wolber	22	
25	Pierre Magne	France	Alleluia-Wolber	10	
26	Arsène Alancourt	France	Alleluia-Wolber	DNF	
27	Marcel Huot	France	Alleluia-Wolber	9	
28	Francis Bouillet	France	Alleluia-Wolber	DNF	
29	André Godinat	France	Alleluia-Wolber	DNF	
31	Hubert Opperman	Australia	Ravat-Wonder-Dunlop	18	
32	Harry Watson	New Zealand	Ravat-Wonder-Dunlop	28	
33	Percy Osborn	Australia	Ravat-Wonder-Dunlop	38	
34	Ernest Bainbridge	Australia	Ravat-Wonder-Dunlop	DNF	
41	Victor Fontan	France	Elvish-Wolber	7	
42	Paul Lerme	France	Elvish-Wolber	DNF	
43	Lucien Laval	France	Elvish-Wolber	29	
44	Salvador Cardona Balbastre	Spain	Elvish-Wolber	15	
45	Jean Mouveroux	France	Fontan-Wolber	21	
46	Raphaël Dupau	France	Fontan-Wolber	36	
47	Marcel Autaa	France	Fontan-Wolber	23	
48	Raphaël Calmette	France	Fontan-Wolber	26	
101	Roger Gregoire	France	France - Alsace-Lorraine	DNF	
102	Marcel Colleu	France	France - Alsace-Lorraine	30	
103	Félix Baud	France	France - Alsace-Lorraine	DNF	
104	Lucien Lange	France	France - Alsace-Lorraine	40	
105	Natale Zaninetti	Italy	France - Alsace-Lorraine	DNF	
106	Édouard Persin	France	France - Champagne	41	
107	Paul Delbart	France	France - Champagne	33	
108	François Henri	France	France - Champagne	34	
109	Hector Denis	France	France - Champagne	DNF	
110	Fernand Moulet	France	France - Champagne	35	
111	Maurice Arnoult	France	France - Normandie	27	
112	Henri Catelan	France	France - Normandie	DNF	
113	Paul Denis	France	France - Normandie	DNF	
114	Elie Guillemer	France	France - Normandie	DNF	
115	Marcel Masson	France	France - Normandie	DNF	
116	Eugène Archambault	France	France - Haute-Bretagne	DNF	
117	Léopold Boisselle	France	France - Haute-Bretagne	DNF	
118	François Favé	France	France - Haute-Bretagne	DNF	
119	Pierre Le Doaré	France	France - Haute-Bretagne	DNF	
120	Yves Ropartz	France	France - Haute-Bretagne	DNF	
121	Auguste Dufour	France	France - South-East	DNF	
122	Paul Filliat	France	France - South-East	25	
123	Henri Miege	France	France - South-East	DNF	
124	Pietro Righetti	Italy	France - South-East	DNF	
126	Henri Touzard	France	France - Île-de-France	DNF	
127	Pierre Gueroult	France	France - Île-de-France	DNF	
128	Roger Lebas	France	France - Île-de-France	DNF	
129	Valentin Halattre	France	France - Île-de-France	DNF	
130	André Dumont	France	France - Île-de-France	DNF	
131	Jules Nempon	France	France - North	DNF	
132	Marcel Gendrin	France	France - North	DNF	
133	Armand Goubert	France	France - North	31	
134	Ernest Lemaire	France	France - North	DNF	
135	Maurice Denamur	France	France - North	DNF	
136	Cipriano Elys	Spain	France - Midi	DNF	
137	Adrien Plautin	France	France - Midi	DNF	
138	Marius Perrier	France	France - Midi	DNF	
139	Gabriël Garcia	France	France - Midi	DNF	
140	Charles Valere	France	France - Midi	DNF	
141	François Menta	France	France - Côte d'Azur	37	
142	Battista Berardi	Italy	France - Côte d'Azur	DNF	
143	Sébastien Piccardo	France	France - Côte d'Azur	DNF	
144	Paulin Lanteri	France	France - Côte d'Azur	DNF	
145	Fernand Fayolle	France	France - Côte d'Azur	39	
151	Edgard Chevillard	France	Touriste-routier	DNF	
154	Alexandre Bontoux	France	Touriste-routier	DNF	
156	Paul Maillet	France	Touriste-routier	DNF	
158	Battista Bertello	Italy	Touriste-routier	DNF	
159	Jean Stellati	France	Touriste-routier	DNF	
160	Charles Roux	France	Touriste-routier	DNF	
161	Robert Beaulieu	France	Touriste-routier	DNF	
163	André Mazziotta	France	Touriste-routier	DNF	
164	Angelo Tintori	Switzerland	Touriste-routier	DNF	
165	Henri Drapel	Switzerland	Touriste-routier	DNF	
167	Pierre Charton	France	Touriste-routier	DNF	
168	René Crepin	France	Touriste-routier	DNF	
170	Simeon Vergnol	France	Touriste-routier	DNF	
174	Battista Ghiano	Italy	Touriste-routier	DNF	
176	Gaston Corbiere	France	Touriste-routier	DNF	
178	Albert Jordens	Belgium	Touriste-routier	DNF	
179	Eugène Hermann	France	Touriste-routier	DNF	
180	Clovis Cros	France	Touriste-routier	DNF	
183	Giosué Cattarossi	Italy	Touriste-routier	DNF	
184	André Léger	France	Touriste-routier	DNF	
185	Giovanni Grespan	Italy	Touriste-routier	DNF	
190	Jules Deloffre	France	Touriste-routier	DNF	
191	Vincent Carrara	France	Touriste-routier	DNF	
192	Emile Faillu	France	Touriste-routier	DNF	
193	Louis Veau	France	Touriste-routier	DNF	
194	Hector Leroy	Belgium	Touriste-routier	DNF	
197	Jean Thilges	France	Touriste-routier	DNF	
198	Julien Grujon	France	Touriste-routier	DNF	
199	René Franc	France	Touriste-routier	DNF	
200	Eugen Werner	Switzerland	Touriste-routier	DNF	
201	Charles Hennuyer	France	Touriste-routier	DNF	
204	Jean Martinet	Switzerland	Touriste-routier	DNF	
205	Guy Bariffi	Switzerland	Touriste-routier	DNF	
206	Jules Gillard	Switzerland	Touriste-routier	DNF	
207	Palmiro Cassonne	Italy	Touriste-routier	DNF	
208	Luigi Bavini	Italy	Touriste-routier	DNF	
210	Jean Guizier	France	Touriste-routier	DNF	
212	Joseph Curtel	France	Touriste-routier	DNF	
213	Alfred Louchet	France	Touriste-routier	DNF	
214	Gino Bartolucci	Italy	Touriste-routier	DNF	
215	Jean Ampurias	France	Touriste-routier	DNF	
216	David Wybon	Belgium	Touriste-routier	DNF	
217	Arthur D'Haene	France	Touriste-routier	DNF	
218	René Wendels	Belgium	Touriste-routier	DNF	
219	Casimir Lombardi	France	Touriste-routier	DNF	
221	Hubert Hennes	France	Touriste-routier	DNF	
222	Charles Loew	France	Touriste-routier	DNF	
223	Georges Petit	France	Touriste-routier	DNF	
224	Alfredo Francini	Italy	Touriste-routier	DNF	
225	Giuseppe Pusterla	Italy	Touriste-routier	DNF	
226	Robert Asse	France	Touriste-routier	DNF	
228	Fernand Lemesle	France	Touriste-routier	DNF	
229	Henri Gottrand	France	Touriste-routier	DNF	
232	Georges De Beurmann	France	Touriste-routier	DNF	
233	Bagio Gavinelli	Italy	Touriste-routier	DNF	
234	Joseph Normand	France	Touriste-routier	DNF	
235	Mario Della-Fina	Italy	Touriste-routier	DNF	
236	Giusto Cerutti	Italy	Touriste-routier	DNF	
238	Marius Rouvier	France	Touriste-routier	DNF	
239	Georges Robert	France	Touriste-routier	DNF	
241	Jules Hendrickx	Belgium	Touriste-routier	DNF	
242	Auguste Baumans	Belgium	Touriste-routier	DNF	
243	Antoine Lox	Belgium	Touriste-routier	DNF	
244	Robert Brugère	France	Touriste-routier	DNF	
248	Henri Colle	Switzerland	Touriste-routier	DNF	
249	Henri Lefevre	France	Touriste-routier	DNF	
250	Henri Thomas	France	Touriste-routier	DNF	
251	Marcel Folliot	France	Touriste-routier	DNF	
252	Charles Cento	France	Touriste-routier	DNF	
253	Bernardo Pesce	Italy	Touriste-routier	DNF	
254	Jean Lucas	France	Touriste-routier	DNF	
255	Edouard Teisseire	France	Touriste-routier	DNF	
256	Baptistin Mousset	France	Touriste-routier	DNF	
257	André Van Vierst	France	Touriste-routier	DNF	
260	René Baudoin	France	Touriste-routier	DNF	
261	Lucien Rich	France	Touriste-routier	DNF	
262	Secondo Martinetto	Italy	Touriste-routier	DNF	
