= 1927 Tour de France, Stage 1 to Stage 12 =

Cycling race stages

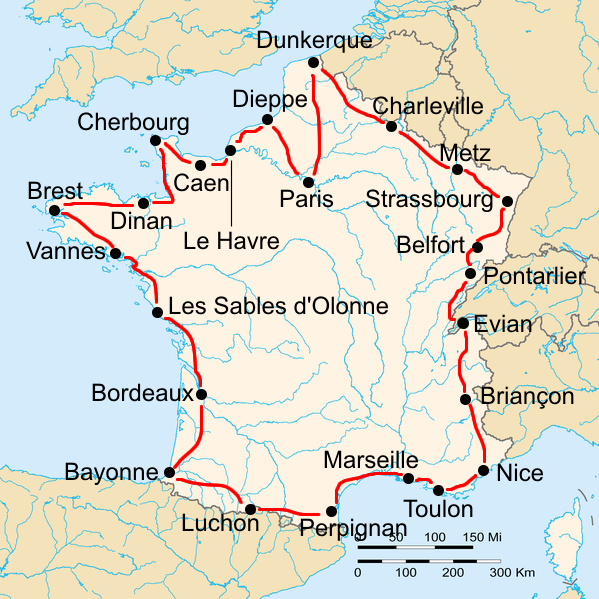
Route of the 1927 Tour de France

The 1927 Tour de France was the 21st edition of the Tour de France, one of cycling's Grand Tours. The Tour began in Paris with a team time trial on 19 June, and Stage 12 occurred on 2 July with a mountainous stage to Perpignan. The race finished in Paris on 17 July.

== Stage 1 ==
19 June 1927 - Paris to Dieppe, 180 km (110 mi) (TTT)

Stage 1 result and general classification after stage 1

Rank	Rider	Team	Time
1	Francis Pélissier (FRA)	Dilecta-Wolber	5h 55' 41"
2	Ferdinand Le Drogo (FRA)	Dilecta-Wolber	s.t.
3	Georges Cuvelier (FRA)	Dilecta-Wolber	s.t.
4	Marcel Huot (FRA)	Dilecta-Wolber	s.t.
5	Gustaaf Van Slembrouck (BEL)	JB Louvet	+ 6' 54"
6	Hector Martin (BEL)	JB Louvet	s.t.
7	Raymond Decorte (BEL)	JB Louvet	+ 10' 23"
8	Pé Verhaegen (BEL)	JB Louvet	s.t.
9	Camille Van De Casteele (BEL)	JB Louvet	s.t.
10	Honoré Barthélémy (FRA)	Dilecta-Wolber	+ 17' 36"

== Stage 2 ==
20 June 1927 - Dieppe to Le Havre, 103 km (64 mi) (TTT)

Stage 2 result

Rank	Rider	Team	Time
1	Maurice De Waele (BEL)	Labor-Dunlop	3h 25' 51"
2	Nicolas Frantz (LUX)	Alcyon-Dunlop	s.t.
3	Julien Vervaecke (BEL)	Armor-Dunlop	s.t.
4	Jean Debusschere (BEL)	Alcyon-Dunlop	+ 15"
5	Gaston Rebry (BEL)	Alcyon-Dunlop	s.t.
6	Louis De Lannoy (BEL)	Labor-Dunlop	s.t.
7	Georges Cuvelier (FRA)	Dilecta-Wolber	+ 2' 13"
8	Francis Pélissier (FRA)	Dilecta-Wolber	s.t.
9	Ferdinand Le Drogo (FRA)	Dilecta-Wolber	s.t.
10	Camille Van De Casteele (BEL)	JB Louvet	+ 7' 06"

General classification after stage 2

Rank	Rider	Team	Time
1	Francis Pélissier (FRA)	Dilecta-Wolber	
2	Ferdinand Le Drogo (FRA)	Dilecta-Wolber	s.t.
3	Georges Cuvelier (FRA)	Dilecta-Wolber	s.t.
4			
5			
6			
7			
8			
9			
10			

== Stage 3 ==
21 June 1927 - Le Havre to Caen, 225 km (140 mi) (TTT)

Stage 3 result

Rank	Rider	Team	Time
1	Hector Martin (BEL)	JB Louvet	7h 21' 05"
2	Gustaaf Van Slembrouck (BEL)	JB Louvet	s.t.
3	Ferdinand Le Drogo (FRA)	Dilecta-Wolber	+ 2' 14"
4	Marcel Huot (FRA)	Dilecta-Wolber	s.t.
5	Francis Pélissier (FRA)	Dilecta-Wolber	s.t.
6	Georges Cuvelier (FRA)	Dilecta-Wolber	s.t.
7	Raymond Decorte (BEL)	JB Louvet	+ 2' 38"
8	Maurice Geldhof (BEL)	JB Louvet	+ 8' 06"
9	Gaston Rebry (BEL)	Alcyon-Dunlop	+ 10' 29"
10	Nicolas Frantz (LUX)	Alcyon-Dunlop	s.t.

General classification after stage 3

Rank	Rider	Team	Time
1	Francis Pélissier (FRA)	Dilecta-Wolber	
2	Ferdinand Le Drogo (FRA)	Dilecta-Wolber	s.t.
3	Georges Cuvelier (FRA)	Dilecta-Wolber	s.t.
4			
5			
6			
7			
8			
9			
10			

== Stage 4 ==
22 June 1927 - Caen to Cherbourg-en-Cotentin, 140 km (87 mi) (TTT)

Stage 4 result

Rank	Rider	Team	Time
1	Camille Van De Casteele (BEL)	JB Louvet	4h 20' 46"
2	Pé Verhaegen (BEL)	JB Louvet	s.t.
3	Joseph Hemelsoet (BEL)	JB Louvet	s.t.
4	Gustaaf Van Slembrouck (BEL)	JB Louvet	s.t.
5	Hector Martin (BEL)	JB Louvet	s.t.
6	Nicolas Frantz (LUX)	Alcyon-Dunlop	+ 2' 47"
7	Adelin Benoît (BEL)	Alcyon-Dunlop	s.t.
8	Julien Vervaecke (BEL)	Armor-Dunlop	s.t.
9	Gaston Rebry (BEL)	Alcyon-Dunlop	s.t.
10	Maurice De Waele (BEL)	Labor-Dunlop	+ 3' 26"

General classification after stage 4

Rank	Rider	Team	Time
1	Francis Pélissier (FRA)	Dilecta-Wolber	
2	Ferdinand Le Drogo (FRA)	Dilecta-Wolber	s.t.
3	Georges Cuvelier (FRA)	Dilecta-Wolber	s.t.
4			
5			
6			
7			
8			
9			
10			

== Stage 5 ==
23 June 1927 - Cherbourg-en-Cotentin to Dinan, 199 km (124 mi) (TTT)

Stage 5 result

Rank	Rider	Team	Time
1	Ferdinand Le Drogo (FRA)	Dilecta-Wolber	6h 34' 57"
2	Francis Pélissier (FRA)	Dilecta-Wolber	s.t.
3	Georges Cuvelier (FRA)	Dilecta-Wolber	s.t.
4	Marcel Huot (FRA)	Dilecta-Wolber	s.t.
5	Arsène Alancourt (FRA)	Dilecta-Wolber	s.t.
6	Honoré Barthélémy (FRA)	Dilecta-Wolber	+ 2' 41"
7	Raymond Decorte (BEL)	JB Louvet	+ 5' 28"
8	Maurice Geldhof (BEL)	JB Louvet	s.t.
9	Hector Martin (BEL)	JB Louvet	s.t.
10	Camille Van De Casteele (BEL)	JB Louvet	+ 7' 38"

General classification after stage 5

Rank	Rider	Team	Time
1	Francis Pélissier (FRA)	Dilecta-Wolber	
2	Ferdinand Le Drogo (FRA)	Dilecta-Wolber	s.t.
3	Georges Cuvelier (FRA)	Dilecta-Wolber	s.t.
4			
5			
6			
7			
8			
9			
10			

== Stage 6 ==
24 June 1927 - Dinan to Brest, 206 km (128 mi) (TTT)

Stage 6 result

Rank	Rider	Team	Time
1	André Leducq (FRA)	Thomann-Dunlop	7h 25' 47"
2	Maurice De Waele (BEL)	Labor-Dunlop	s.t.
3	Louis Muller (BEL)	Armor-Dunlop	s.t.
4	Nicolas Frantz (LUX)	Alcyon-Dunlop	+ 4' 33"
5	Jean Debusschere (BEL)	Alcyon-Dunlop	s.t.
6	Pé Verhaegen (BEL)	JB Louvet	+ 6' 52"
7	Raymond Decorte (BEL)	JB Louvet	s.t.
8	Camille Van De Casteele (BEL)	JB Louvet	s.t.
9	Hector Martin (BEL)	JB Louvet	s.t.
10	Gaston Rebry (BEL)	Alcyon-Dunlop	+ 8' 12"

General classification after stage 6

Rank	Rider	Team	Time
1	Ferdinand Le Drogo (FRA)	Dilecta-Wolber	
2	Hector Martin (BEL)	JB Louvet	+ 4' 31"
3	Georges Cuvelier (FRA)	Dilecta-Wolber	+ 7' 16"
4			
5			
6			
7			
8			
9			
10			

== Stage 7 ==
25 June 1927 - Brest to Vannes, 207 km (129 mi) (TTT)

Stage 7 result

Rank	Rider	Team	Time
1	Gustaaf Van Slembrouck (BEL)	JB Louvet	6h 40' 28"
2	Maurice Geldhof (BEL)	JB Louvet	s.t.
3	Camille Van De Casteele (BEL)	JB Louvet	s.t.
4	Hector Martin (BEL)	JB Louvet	s.t.
5	Georges Brosteaux (BEL)	JB Louvet	+ 2' 32"
6	Pé Verhaegen (BEL)	JB Louvet	+ 3' 02"
7	Gaston Rebry (BEL)	Alcyon-Dunlop	+ 4' 33"
8	Nicolas Frantz (LUX)	Alcyon-Dunlop	+ 6' 22"
9	André Leducq (FRA)	Thomann-Dunlop	+ 6' 49"
10	Maurice De Waele (BEL)	Labor-Dunlop	s.t.

General classification after stage 7

Rank	Rider	Team	Time
1	Hector Martin (BEL)	JB Louvet	
2	Ferdinand Le Drogo (FRA)	Dilecta-Wolber	+ 17' 03"
3	Maurice De Waele (BEL)	Labor-Dunlop	+ 19' 14"
4			
5			
6			
7			
8			
9			
10			

== Stage 8 ==
26 June 1927 - Vannes to Les Sables d'Olonne, 204 km (127 mi) (TTT)

Stage 8 result

Rank	Rider	Team	Time
1	Raymond Decorte (BEL)	JB Louvet	6h 03' 35"
2	Gustaaf Van Slembrouck (BEL)	JB Louvet	s.t.
3	Maurice Geldhof (BEL)	JB Louvet	s.t.
4	Camille Van De Casteele (BEL)	JB Louvet	s.t.
5	Hector Martin (BEL)	JB Louvet	s.t.
6	Pé Verhaegen (BEL)	JB Louvet	+ 1' 43"
7	Georges Brosteaux (BEL)	JB Louvet	+ 6' 33"
8	Nicolas Frantz (LUX)	Alcyon-Dunlop	+ 15' 01"
9	Gaston Rebry (BEL)	Alcyon-Dunlop	s.t.
10	André Leducq (FRA)	Thomann-Dunlop	s.t.

General classification after stage 8

Rank	Rider	Team	Time
1	Hector Martin (BEL)	JB Louvet	
2	Raymond Decorte (BEL)	JB Louvet	+ 34' 08"
3	Maurice De Waele (BEL)	Labor-Dunlop	+ 34' 25"
4			
5			
6			
7			
8			
9			
10			

== Stage 9 ==
27 June 1927 - Les Sables d'Olonne to Bordeaux, 285 km (177 mi) (TTT)

Stage 9 result

Rank	Rider	Team	Time
1	Adelin Benoît (BEL)	Alcyon-Dunlop	8h 56' 34"
2	Gaston Rebry (BEL)	Alcyon-Dunlop	s.t.
3	Nicolas Frantz (LUX)	Alcyon-Dunlop	s.t.
4	André Leducq (FRA)	Thomann-Dunlop	s.t.
5	Julien Vervaecke (BEL)	Armor-Dunlop	s.t.
6	Hector Martin (BEL)	JB Louvet	+ 16' 26"
7	Maurice Geldhof (BEL)	JB Louvet	s.t.
8	Camille Van De Casteele (BEL)	JB Louvet	s.t.
9	Gustaaf Van Slembrouck (BEL)	JB Louvet	s.t.
10	Raymond Decorte (BEL)	JB Louvet	s.t.

General classification after stage 9

Rank	Rider	Team	Time
1	Hector Martin (BEL)	JB Louvet	
2	Nicolas Frantz (LUX)	Alcyon-Dunlop	+ 21' 16"
3	Gaston Rebry (BEL)	Alcyon-Dunlop	+ 30' 59"
4			
5			
6			
7			
8			
9			
10			

== Stage 10 ==
28 June 1927 - Bordeaux to Bayonne, 189 km (117 mi)

Stage 10 result

Rank	Rider	Team	Time
1	Pé Verhaegen (BEL)	JB Louvet	7h 13' 40"
2	André Leducq (FRA)	Thomann-Dunlop	s.t.
3	Raymond Decorte (BEL)	JB Louvet	s.t.
4	Pierre Magne (FRA)	Alleluia-Wolber	s.t.
5	Julien Moineau (FRA)	Alleluia-Wolber	s.t.
6	André Devauchelle (FRA)	Alleluia-Wolber	s.t.
7	Albert Jordens (BEL)	Touriste-routier	s.t.
=8	Gaston Rebry (BEL)	Alcyon-Dunlop	s.t.
=8	Louis Muller (BEL)	Armor-Dunlop	s.t.
=8	Maurice De Waele (BEL)	Labor-Dunlop	s.t.

General classification after stage 10

Rank	Rider	Team	Time
1	Hector Martin (BEL)	JB Louvet	
2	Nicolas Frantz (LUX)	Alcyon-Dunlop	+ 23' 04"
3	Gaston Rebry (BEL)	Alcyon-Dunlop	+ 30' 59"
4			
5			
6			
7			
8			
9			
10			

== Stage 11 ==
30 June 1927 - Bayonne to Luchon, 326 km (203 mi)

Stage 11 result

Rank	Rider	Team	Time
1	Nicolas Frantz (LUX)	Alcyon-Dunlop	16h 25' 10"
2	Adelin Benoît (BEL)	Alcyon-Dunlop	+ 11' 40"
3	André Leducq (FRA)	Thomann-Dunlop	+ 14' 40"
4	Maurice De Waele (BEL)	Labor-Dunlop	+ 22' 13"
5	Michele Gordini (ITA)	Touriste-routier	+ 27' 58"
6	Jean Debusschere (BEL)	Alcyon-Dunlop	+ 31' 48"
7	Henri Touzard (FRA)	Touriste-routier	+ 32' 18"
8	José Pelletier (FRA)	Touriste-routier	+ 36' 10"
9	Louis Muller (BEL)	Armor-Dunlop	+ 38' 57"
10	Secondo Martinetto (ITA)	Touriste-routier	+ 44' 58"

General classification after stage 11

Rank	Rider	Team	Time
1	Nicolas Frantz (LUX)	Alcyon-Dunlop	
2	Maurice De Waele (BEL)	Labor-Dunlop	+ 38' 27"
3	Hector Martin (BEL)	JB Louvet	+ 1h 37' 48"
4			
5			
6			
7			
8			
9			
10			

== Stage 12 ==
2 July 1927 - Luchon to Perpignan, 323 km (201 mi)

Stage 12 result

Rank	Rider	Team	Time
1	Gustaaf Van Slembrouck (BEL)	JB Louvet	12h 10' 14"
2	Nicolas Frantz (LUX)	Alcyon-Dunlop	s.t.
3	Adelin Benoît (BEL)	Alcyon-Dunlop	s.t.
4	André Leducq (FRA)	Thomann-Dunlop	s.t.
5	Maurice De Waele (BEL)	Labor-Dunlop	s.t.
6	Julien Vervaecke (BEL)	Armor-Dunlop	s.t.
7	Antonin Magne (FRA)	Alleluia-Wolber	+ 3' 29"
8	Raymond Decorte (BEL)	JB Louvet	+ 9' 48"
9	Julien Moineau (FRA)	Alleluia-Wolber	+ 16' 01"
10	Albert Jordens (BEL)	Touriste-routier	s.t.

General classification after stage 12

Rank	Rider	Team	Time
1	Nicolas Frantz (LUX)	Alcyon-Dunlop	
2	Maurice De Waele (BEL)	Labor-Dunlop	+ 38' 27"
3	Julien Vervaecke (BEL)	Armor-Dunlop	+ 2h 13' 46"
4			
5			
6			
7			
8			
9			
10			
