= 1927 Tour de France, Stage 13 to Stage 24 =

Cycling race stages

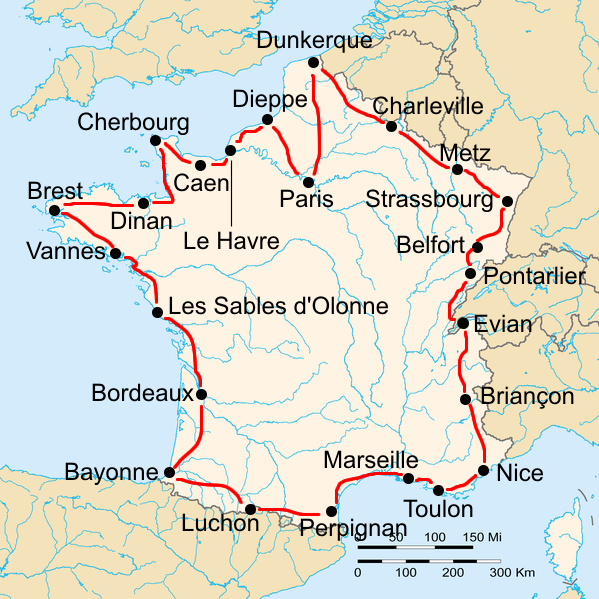
Route of the 1927 Tour de France

The 1927 Tour de France was the 21st edition of the Tour de France, one of cycling's Grand Tours. The Tour began in Paris with a team time trial on 19 June, and Stage 13 occurred on 4 July with a flat stage from Perpignan. The race finished in Paris on 17 July.

== Stage 13 ==
4 July 1927 - Perpignan to Marseille, 360 km (220 mi)

Stage 13 result

Rank	Rider	Team	Time
1	Maurice De Waele (BEL)	Labor-Dunlop	14h 22' 37"
2	Pé Verhaegen (BEL)	JB Louvet	s.t.
3	Nicolas Frantz (LUX)	Alcyon-Dunlop	s.t.
4	André Leducq (FRA)	Thomann-Dunlop	s.t.
5	Julien Vervaecke (BEL)	Armor-Dunlop	s.t.
6	Antonin Magne (FRA)	Alleluia-Wolber	s.t.
7	Louis De Lannoy (BEL)	Labor-Dunlop	s.t.
8	Hector Martin (BEL)	JB Louvet	+ 6' 17"
9	Adelin Benoît (BEL)	Alcyon-Dunlop	s.t.
10	Gustaaf Van Slembrouck (BEL)	JB Louvet	s.t.

General classification after stage 13

Rank	Rider	Team	Time
1	Nicolas Frantz (LUX)	Alcyon-Dunlop	
2	Maurice De Waele (BEL)	Labor-Dunlop	+ 38' 27"
3	Julien Vervaecke (BEL)	Armor-Dunlop	+ 2h 13' 46"
4			
5			
6			
7			
8			
9			
10			

== Stage 14 ==
5 July 1927 - Marseille to Toulon, 120 km (75 mi) (TTT)

Stage 14 result

Rank	Rider	Team	Time
1	Antonin Magne (FRA)	Alleluia-Wolber	3h 51' 44"
2	Maurice Geldhof (BEL)	JB Louvet	+ 19"
3	Hector Martin (BEL)	JB Louvet	s.t.
4	Pé Verhaegen (BEL)	JB Louvet	s.t.
5	Raymond Decorte (BEL)	JB Louvet	+ 3' 28"
6	André Leducq (FRA)	Thomann-Dunlop	+ 6' 54"
7	Adelin Benoît (BEL)	Alcyon-Dunlop	s.t.
8	Louis De Lannoy (BEL)	Labor-Dunlop	s.t.
9	Julien Vervaecke (BEL)	Armor-Dunlop	s.t.
10	Nicolas Frantz (LUX)	Alcyon-Dunlop	s.t.

General classification after stage 14

Rank	Rider	Team	Time
1	Nicolas Frantz (LUX)	Alcyon-Dunlop	
2	Maurice De Waele (BEL)	Labor-Dunlop	+ 38' 27"
3	Julien Vervaecke (BEL)	Armor-Dunlop	+ 2h 13' 46"
4			
5			
6			
7			
8			
9			
10			

== Stage 15 ==
6 July 1927 - Toulon to Nice, 220 km (140 mi)

Stage 15 result

Rank	Rider	Team	Time
1	Nicolas Frantz (LUX)	Alcyon-Dunlop	11h 40' 02"
2	Pé Verhaegen (BEL)	JB Louvet	+ 2' 41"
3	Julien Vervaecke (BEL)	Armor-Dunlop	+ 3' 02"
4	André Leducq (FRA)	Thomann-Dunlop	+ 5' 13"
5	Michele Gordini (ITA)	Touriste-routier	s.t.
6	Julien Moineau (FRA)	Alleluia-Wolber	+ 6' 19"
7	Louis Muller (BEL)	Armor-Dunlop	+ 9' 19"
8	François Menta (FRA)	Touriste-routier	+ 9' 48"
9	Maurice Geldhof (BEL)	JB Louvet	+ 11' 12"
10	Antonin Magne (FRA)	Alleluia-Wolber	+ 11' 25"

General classification after stage 15

Rank	Rider	Team	Time
1	Nicolas Frantz (LUX)	Alcyon-Dunlop	
2	Maurice De Waele (BEL)	Labor-Dunlop	+ 53' 55"
3	Julien Vervaecke (BEL)	Armor-Dunlop	+ 2h 16' 48"
4			
5			
6			
7			
8			
9			
10			

== Stage 16 ==
8 July 1927 - Nice to Briançon, 275 km (171 mi)

Stage 16 result

Rank	Rider	Team	Time
1	Julien Vervaecke (BEL)	Armor-Dunlop	12h 58' 04"
2	Nicolas Frantz (LUX)	Alcyon-Dunlop	+ 4' 31"
3	Maurice Arnoult (FRA)	Touriste-routier	+ 5' 23"
4	Maurice De Waele (BEL)	Labor-Dunlop	+ 11' 41"
5	André Leducq (FRA)	Thomann-Dunlop	+ 12' 15"
6	Antonin Magne (FRA)	Alleluia-Wolber	+ 12' 53"
7	Louis De Lannoy (BEL)	Labor-Dunlop	+ 13' 49"
8	Adelin Benoît (BEL)	Alcyon-Dunlop	+ 18' 42"
9	Secondo Martinetto (ITA)	Touriste-routier	+ 19' 05"
10	Maurice Geldhof (BEL)	JB Louvet	+ 24' 21"

General classification after stage 16

Rank	Rider	Team	Time
1	Nicolas Frantz (LUX)	Alcyon-Dunlop	
2	Maurice De Waele (BEL)	Labor-Dunlop	+ 1h 01' 05"
3	Julien Vervaecke (BEL)	Armor-Dunlop	+ 2h 12' 17"
4			
5			
6			
7			
8			
9			
10			

== Stage 17 ==
9 July 1927 - Briançon to Evian, 283 km (176 mi)

Stage 17 result

Rank	Rider	Team	Time
1	Pé Verhaegen (BEL)	JB Louvet	11h 57' 02"
2	Charles Martinet (SUI)	Touriste-routier	+ 1' 36"
3	Maurice De Waele (BEL)	Labor-Dunlop	+ 6' 46"
4	Antonin Magne (FRA)	Alleluia-Wolber	+ 14' 35"
5	Nicolas Frantz (LUX)	Alcyon-Dunlop	+ 21' 48"
6	Julien Vervaecke (BEL)	Armor-Dunlop	+ 24' 18"
7	Adelin Benoît (BEL)	Alcyon-Dunlop	+ 27' 46"
8	André Leducq (FRA)	Thomann-Dunlop	s.t.
9	José Pelletier (FRA)	Touriste-routier	+ 30' 32"
10	Maurice Geldhof (BEL)	JB Louvet	+ 42' 10"

General classification after stage 17

Rank	Rider	Team	Time
1	Nicolas Frantz (LUX)	Alcyon-Dunlop	
2	Maurice De Waele (BEL)	Labor-Dunlop	+ 46' 03"
3	Julien Vervaecke (BEL)	Armor-Dunlop	+ 2h 14' 47"
4			
5			
6			
7			
8			
9			
10			

== Stage 18 ==
11 July 1927 - Evian to Pontarlier, 213 km (132 mi) (TTT)

Stage 18 result

Rank	Rider	Team	Time
1	Adelin Benoît (BEL)	Alcyon-Dunlop	7h 09' 31"
2	Julien Vervaecke (BEL)	Armor-Dunlop	s.t.
3	André Leducq (FRA)	Thomann-Dunlop	s.t.
4	Maurice De Waele (BEL)	Labor-Dunlop	s.t.
5	Nicolas Frantz (LUX)	Alcyon-Dunlop	s.t.
6	Pé Verhaegen (BEL)	JB Louvet	+ 8' 01"
7	Julien Moineau (FRA)	Alleluia-Wolber	+ 14' 19"
8	Antonin Magne (FRA)	Alleluia-Wolber	s.t.
9	Hector Martin (BEL)	JB Louvet	+ 21' 16"
10	Raymond Decorte (BEL)	JB Louvet	+ 25' 04"

General classification after stage 18

Rank	Rider	Team	Time
1	Nicolas Frantz (LUX)	Alcyon-Dunlop	
2	Maurice De Waele (BEL)	Labor-Dunlop	+ 46' 03"
3	Julien Vervaecke (BEL)	Armor-Dunlop	+ 2h 14' 47"
4			
5			
6			
7			
8			
9			
10			

== Stage 19 ==
12 July 1927 - Pontarlier to Belfort, 119 km (74 mi) (TTT)

Stage 19 result

Rank	Rider	Team	Time
1	Maurice Geldhof (BEL)	JB Louvet	3h 45' 30"
2	Pierre Magne (FRA)	Alleluia-Wolber	+ 2' 05"
3	Antonin Magne (FRA)	Alleluia-Wolber	s.t.
4	Julien Moineau (FRA)	Alleluia-Wolber	s.t.
5	André Devauchelle (FRA)	Alleluia-Wolber	+ 2' 57"
6	Gustaaf Van Slembrouck (BEL)	JB Louvet	+ 3' 00"
7	Joseph Hemelsoet (BEL)	JB Louvet	s.t.
8	Jean Debusschere (BEL)	Alcyon-Dunlop	+ 5' 50"
9	Nicolas Frantz (LUX)	Alcyon-Dunlop	s.t.
10	André Leducq (FRA)	Thomann-Dunlop	s.t.

General classification after stage 19

Rank	Rider	Team	Time
1	Nicolas Frantz (LUX)	Alcyon-Dunlop	
2	Maurice De Waele (BEL)	Labor-Dunlop	+ 46' 03"
3	Julien Vervaecke (BEL)	Armor-Dunlop	+ 2h 18' 37"
4			
5			
6			
7			
8			
9			
10			

== Stage 20 ==
13 July 1927 - Belfort to Strasbourg, 145 km (90 mi) (TTT)

Stage 20 result

Rank	Rider	Team	Time
1	Raymond Decorte (BEL)	JB Louvet	4h 19' 16"
2	Pé Verhaegen (BEL)	JB Louvet	s.t.
3	Gustaaf Van Slembrouck (BEL)	JB Louvet	s.t.
4	Antonin Magne (FRA)	Alleluia-Wolber	+ 4' 08"
5	Julien Moineau (FRA)	Alleluia-Wolber	s.t.
6	Hector Martin (BEL)	JB Louvet	+ 4' 24"
7	Maurice Geldhof (BEL)	JB Louvet	s.t.
8	Nicolas Frantz (LUX)	Alcyon-Dunlop	+ 4' 58"
9	Louis De Lannoy (BEL)	Labor-Dunlop	s.t.
10	Jean Debusschere (BEL)	Alcyon-Dunlop	s.t.

General classification after stage 20

Rank	Rider	Team	Time
1	Nicolas Frantz (LUX)	Alcyon-Dunlop	
2	Maurice De Waele (BEL)	Labor-Dunlop	+ 46' 03"
3	Julien Vervaecke (BEL)	Armor-Dunlop	+ 2h 13' 37"
4			
5			
6			
7			
8			
9			
10			

== Stage 21 ==
14 July 1927 - Strasbourg to Metz, 165 km (103 mi) (TTT)

Stage 21 result

Rank	Rider	Team	Time
1	Nicolas Frantz (LUX)	Alcyon-Dunlop	5h 24' 54"
2	Joseph Hemelsoet (BEL)	JB Louvet	+ 34"
3	Hector Martin (BEL)	JB Louvet	s.t.
4	Maurice Geldhof (BEL)	JB Louvet	s.t.
5	Louis De Lannoy (BEL)	Labor-Dunlop	+ 2' 12"
6	Louis Muller (BEL)	Armor-Dunlop	s.t.
7	Julien Vervaecke (BEL)	Armor-Dunlop	s.t.
8	Maurice De Waele (BEL)	Labor-Dunlop	s.t.
9	Raymond Decorte (BEL)	JB Louvet	+ 4' 24"
10	Antonin Magne (FRA)	Alleluia-Wolber	+ 6' 56"

General classification after stage 21

Rank	Rider	Team	Time
1	Nicolas Frantz (LUX)	Alcyon-Dunlop	
2	Maurice De Waele (BEL)	Labor-Dunlop	+ 48' 15"
3	Julien Vervaecke (BEL)	Armor-Dunlop	+ 2h 15' 49"
4			
5			
6			
7			
8			
9			
10			

== Stage 22 ==
15 July 1927 - Metz to Charleville, 159 km (99 mi) (TTT)

Stage 22 result

Rank	Rider	Team	Time
1	Hector Martin (BEL)	JB Louvet	5h 00' 29"
2	Gustaaf Van Slembrouck (BEL)	JB Louvet	s.t.
3	Pé Verhaegen (BEL)	JB Louvet	s.t.
4	Maurice Geldhof (BEL)	JB Louvet	s.t.
5	Raymond Decorte (BEL)	JB Louvet	s.t.
6	André Leducq (FRA)	Thomann-Dunlop	+ 5' 33"
7	Adelin Benoît (BEL)	Alcyon-Dunlop	s.t.
8	Nicolas Frantz (LUX)	Alcyon-Dunlop	s.t.
9	Maurice De Waele (BEL)	Labor-Dunlop	s.t.
10	Julien Vervaecke (BEL)	Armor-Dunlop	s.t.

General classification after stage 22

Rank	Rider	Team	Time
1	Nicolas Frantz (LUX)	Alcyon-Dunlop	
2	Maurice De Waele (BEL)	Labor-Dunlop	+ 48' 15"
3	Julien Vervaecke (BEL)	Armor-Dunlop	+ 2h 15' 49"
4			
5			
6			
7			
8			
9			
10			

== Stage 23 ==
16 July 1927 - Charleville to Dunkerque, 270 km (170 mi) (TTT)

Stage 23 result

Rank	Rider	Team	Time
1	André Leducq (FRA)	Thomann-Dunlop	9h 09' 38"
2	Julien Vervaecke (BEL)	Armor-Dunlop	s.t.
3	Adelin Benoît (BEL)	Alcyon-Dunlop	s.t.
4	Nicolas Frantz (LUX)	Alcyon-Dunlop	s.t.
5	Pé Verhaegen (BEL)	JB Louvet	+ 2' 57"
6	Gustaaf Van Slembrouck (BEL)	JB Louvet	+ 4' 29"
7	Antonin Magne (FRA)	Alleluia-Wolber	+ 11' 02"
8	Julien Moineau (FRA)	Alleluia-Wolber	s.t.
9	Maurice Geldhof (BEL)	JB Louvet	+ 12' 15"
10	Raymond Decorte (BEL)	JB Louvet	+ 18' 37"

General classification after stage 23

Rank	Rider	Team	Time
1	Nicolas Frantz (LUX)	Alcyon-Dunlop	
2	Maurice De Waele (BEL)	Labor-Dunlop	+ 1h 21' 06"
3	Julien Vervaecke (BEL)	Armor-Dunlop	+ 2h 15' 49"
4			
5			
6			
7			
8			
9			
10			

== Stage 24 ==
17 July 1927 - Dunkerque to Paris, 344 km (214 mi)

Stage 24 result

Rank	Rider	Team	Time
1	André Leducq (FRA)	Thomann-Dunlop	13h 58' 01"
2	Pé Verhaegen (BEL)	JB Louvet	+ 3' 19"
3	Nicolas Frantz (LUX)	Alcyon-Dunlop	+ 3' 54"
4	Antonin Magne (FRA)	Alleluia-Wolber	s.t.
5	Adelin Benoît (BEL)	Alcyon-Dunlop	+ 6' 14"
6	Albert Jordens (BEL)	Touriste-routier	s.t.
7	Pierre Magne (FRA)	Alleluia-Wolber	s.t.
8	Omer Mahy (BEL)	Touriste-routier	s.t.
9	Michele Gordini (ITA)	Touriste-routier	+ 7' 02"
10	Hector Martin (BEL)	JB Louvet	+ 7' 14"

General classification after stage 24

Rank	Rider	Team	Time
1	Nicolas Frantz (LUX)	Alcyon-Dunlop	198h 16' 42"
2	Maurice De Waele (BEL)	Labor-Dunlop	+ 1h 48' 21"
3	Julien Vervaecke (BEL)	Armor-Dunlop	+ 2h 25' 06"
4	André Leducq (FRA)	Thomann-Dunlop	+ 3h 02' 05"
5	Adelin Benoît (BEL)	Alcyon-Dunlop	+ 4h 45' 01"
6	Antonin Magne (FRA)	Alleluia-Wolber	+ 4h 48' 23"
7	Pé Verhaegen (BEL)	JB Louvet	+ 6h 18' 36"
8	Julien Moineau (FRA)	Alleluia-Wolber	+ 6h 36' 17"
9	Hector Martin (BEL)	JB Louvet	+ 7h 07' 34"
10	Maurice Geldhof (BEL)	JB Louvet	+ 7h 16' 02"
