= 1925 Liège–Bastogne–Liège =

Race details
- Dates: 14 June 1925
- Stages: 1
- Distance: 231 km (144 mi)
- Winning time: 7h 52' 00"

Results
	Winner	Georges Ronsse (BEL)
	Second	Gustaaf Van Slembrouck (BEL)
	Third	Louis Eelen (BEL)

The 1925 Liège–Bastogne–Liège was the 15th edition of the Liège–Bastogne–Liège cycle race and was held on 14 June 1925. The race started and finished in Liège. The race was won by Georges Ronsse.

== General classification ==
Final general classification

Rank	Rider	Time
1	Georges Ronsse (BEL)	7h 52' 00"
2	Gustaaf Van Slembrouck (BEL)	+ 0"
3	Louis Eelen (BEL)	+ 8' 00"
4	Armand Van Bruaene (BEL)	+ 8' 00"
5	Henri Dekeyser (BEL)	+ 8' 00"
6	Georges Brosteaux (BEL)	+ 15' 00"
7	Léon Martin (BEL)	+ 15' 00"
8	Julien Vuylsteke (BEL)	+ 15' 00"
9	Omer Mahy (BEL)	+ 16' 00"
10	Omer Taverne (BEL)	+ 18' 00"
