= 1931 Tour of Flanders =

Race details
- Dates: 22 March 1931
- Stages: 1
- Distance: 227 km (141.1 mi)
- Winning time: 6h 52' 00"

Results
	Winner	Romain Gijssels (BEL)
	Second	Cesar Bogaert (NED)
	Third	Jean Aerts (BEL)

The 15th edition of the Tour of Flanders cycling classic race was held on Sunday, 2 March 1931. Belgian Romain Gijssels won the Monument for a first time. Of the 116 starting cyclists, 50 reached the finish.

== Route ==
The race started in Ghent and covered 227 km on the way to the finish in Wetteren.

The course featured 4 categorized climbs:

- Tiegemberg
- Kwaremont
- Kruisberg
- Edelareberg

== Race report ==
The final winner was Romain Gijssels, who won in the sprint ahead of his five breakaway companions in Wetteren. The Dutchman Cesar Bogaert finished second, while the Belgian Jean Aerts took the third place. Gijssels completed the race with an average of 33.058 km/h

== General classification ==
=== Final general classification ===
Rank	Rider	Team	Time
1	Romain Gijssels (BEL)	Dilecta-Wolber	6h 52' 00"
2	Cesar Bogaert (NED)	La Nordiste-Wolber	s.t.
3	Jean Aerts (BEL)	Génial Lucifer	s.t.
4	Hector Martin (BEL)	Alcyon-Dunlop	s.t.
5	Gustaaf Van Slembrouck (BEL)	La Nordiste-Wolber	s.t.
6	Julien Vervaecke (BEL)	La Nordiste-Wolber	s.t.
7	Émile Joly (BEL)	Alcyon-Dunlop	3' 00"
8	Alfons Schepers (BEL)	Alcyon-Dunlop	s.t.
9	Armand van Bruaene (BEL)	Oscar Egg-Dunlop	s.t.
10	François Moreels (FRA)	Individual	s.t.
