= 1926 Tour of Flanders =

Race details
- Dates: March 21, 1926
- Stages: 1
- Distance: 217 km (134.8 mi)
- Winning time: 7h 12' 30"

Results
	Winner	Denis Verschueren (BEL)
	Second	Gustaaf Van Slembrouck (BEL)
	Third	Raymond Decorte (BEL)

The 10th edition of the Tour of Flanders cycling classic race was held on Sunday, 21 March 1926. Belgian Denis Verschueren won the Monument. Of the 76 starting cyclists, 26 reached the finish.

== Route ==
The race had Ghent as both start and finish place and covered 217 km.

The course featured 2 categorized climbs:

- Tiegemberg
- Kwaremont

== Race report ==
The final winner was the Belgian rider Denis Verschueren, who won in the sprint ahead of his breakaway companions. Gustave Van Slembrouck and Raymond Decorte finished second and third. Verschueren completed the race with an average of 30.104 km/h.

== General classification ==
=== Final general classification ===
Rank	Rider	Team	Time
1	Denis Verschueren (BEL)	Wonder–Ravat	7h 12' 30"
2	Gustaaf Van Slembrouck (BEL)	J.B. Louvet–Wolber	s.t.
3	Raymond Decorte (BEL)	J.B. Louvet–Pouchois	s.t.
4	Julien Delbecque (BEL)	Armor-Dunlop	s.t.
5	Leon Parmentier (BEL)	Automoto–Hutchinson	s.t.
6	Omer Vermeulen (BEL)	Meteore–Wolber	s.t.
7	Gaston Rebry (BEL)	Peugeot–Dunlop	s.t.
8	August Verdyck (BEL)	Automoto–Hutchinson	+ 2' 30"
9	Nicolas Frantz (LUX)	Alcyon–Dunlop	+ 6' 00"
10	Jules Huyvaert (BEL)	La Française–Diamant–Dunlop	s.t.
