= 1927 Paris–Tours =

Race details
- Dates: 1 May 1927
- Stages: 1
- Distance: 253 km (157.2 mi)
- Winning time: 7h 09' 44"

Results
	Winner	Heiri Suter (SUI)
	Second	Gustave Van Slembrouck (BEL)
	Third	Georges Ronsse (BEL)

The 1927 Paris–Tours was the 22nd edition of the Paris–Tours cycle race and was held on 1 May 1927. The race started in Paris and finished in Tours. The race was won by Heiri Suter.

== General classification ==
Final general classification

Rank	Rider	Time
1	Heiri Suter (SUI)	7h 09' 44"
2	Gustave Van Slembrouck (BEL)	+ 0"
3	Georges Ronsse (BEL)	+ 0"
4	Achille Souchard (FRA)	+ 27"
5	Julien Delbecque (BEL)	+ 27"
6	Ferdinand Le Drogo (FRA)	+ 27"
7	Julien Vervaecke (BEL)	+ 6' 11"
8	Roger Gregoire (FRA)	+ 8' 44"
9	Louis Gras (FRA)	+ 8' 44"
10	Désiré Louesse (BEL)	+ 8' 44"
