= 1925 Tour of Flanders =

9th Tour of Flanders
Race details
- Dates: 29 March 1925
- Stages: 1
- Distance: 210 km (130.5 mi)
- Winning time: 7h 28' 00" (or 8h 49')

Results
| | Winner | Julien Delbecque (BEL) | (Armor–Dunlop) |
| | Second | Jef Pé (BEL) | |
| | Third | Hector Martin (BEL) | (J.B.Louvet–Pouchois) |

The ninth running of the Tour of Flanders cycling classic was held on Sunday, 29 March 1925. Belgian Julien Delbecque won the race in a two-man sprint with Jef Pé. 25 of 57 riders finished.

== Route ==
The race started and finished in Ghent – totaling 210 km. The course featured two categorized climbs:

- Tiegemberg
- Kwaremont

== Results ==
Result
| Rank | Rider | Team | Time | Time |
|---|---|---|---|---|
| 1 | Julien Delbecque (BEL) | Armor–Dunlop | 7h 28' 00" | 8h 49' |
| 2 | Jef Pé (BEL) | – | s.t. | s.t. |
| 3 | Hector Martin (BEL) | J.B.Louvet–Pouchois | + 3' 30" | + 4' 45" |
| 4 | Charles Juseret (BEL) | – | s.t. | s.t. |
| 5 | Adolf van Bruaene (BEL) | La Française | + 3' 32" | s.t. |
| 6 | Maurice De Waele (BEL) | Wonder | + 9' 15" | + 9' 15" |
| 7 | Aimé Dossche (BEL) | – | s.t. | s.t. |
| 8 | Leon Luites (BEL) | – | + 10' 15" | + 10' 15" |
| 9 | Jean Hardy (BEL) | – | s.t. | s.t. |
| 10 | Marcel Houyoux (BEL) | – | s.t. | s.t. |

Note: Sources differ on the time differences for third to fifth place.
