= Ropars =

Origin
- Origin: Breton
- Meaning: Robert
- Region of origin: Brittany

Other names
- Variant forms: Roparzh, Ropart, Ropartz, Roparz, Roper, Ropers, Ropert, Ropertz, Roperz

Ropars is a Breton-language surname. Notable people with the surname include:

- Loeiz Ropars - Breton traditional singer
- Anne-Marie Ropars - Breton poet
- Erwan Ropars - Piper on l'Héritage des Celtes, penn-soner of the bagad Kemper for 25 years and founder of the bagad Kerne
- Joseph Ropars - Commander of the SS France from September 1963 to July 1966
- Marie-Claire Ropars-Wuilleumier - theorist of literature, cinema and aesthetics
- Guy Ropartz - French composer and conductor
- Marcel Ropars - Penn-soner of the bagad Kevrenn Brest Sant Mark from 1955 to 1958
- Eugénie Ropars - Founder of the Celtic circle Poullaouen in the 1930s
- Yves Ropartz (1903–1983), French racing cyclist
