= Druz =

Druz may refer to

- Druze, a Middle Eastern religious community
- Druz-Iki, a village in Azerbaijan
- Aleksandr Druz (born 1955), Russian television personality
- Émile Druz (1891–?), French racing cyclist
