= Ferdinand Le Drogo =

French cyclist

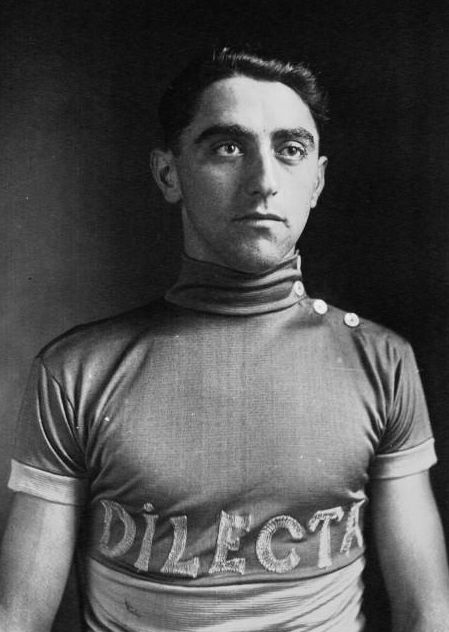

Personal information
- Full name: Ferdinand Le Drogo
- Born: 10 October 1903 Pontivy, France
- Died: 24 April 1976 (aged 72) Saint-Gildas-de-Rhuys, France

Cycling career
- Sport: Cycling
- Discipline: Road
- Role: Rider

Professional team
- 1926–1936: Dilecta–Wolber

Major wins
- 2nd place 1931 Road World Championships
Medal record
Men's road bicycle racing
Representing France
World Championships
Silver medal – second place	1931 Copenhagen	Elite Men's Road Race

Ferdinand Le Drogo (10 October 1903 – 24 April 1976) was a French professional road bicycle racer. He is most known for his silver medal in the Elite race of the 1931 Road World Championships. Ferdinand Le Drogo was the older brother of cyclist Paul Le Drogo.

In the 1927 Tour de France, Le Drogo took part in the Dilecta-Wolber team, which won the first stage, led by Francis Pélissier, who was the first leader of the general classification. Le Drogo won the fifth stage. In the sixth stage, Francis Pélissier abandoned sick. Ferdinand Le Drogo, who was second in the general classification, became the new leader. In the seventh stage, while Le Drogo was in the yellow jersey, the Tour passed in the region where he was born. His supporters cheered for Le Drogo, and he got excited and sped away from his teammates. That cost him too much energy, and he lost 20 minutes in that stage to the J.B. Louvet team, so the lead was transferred to Hector Martin, from the J.B. Louvet team. Le Drogo would never lead the Tour de France again.

== Major results ==
1926
1st, Tour des Cornouaillies
1st, Nantes-Les Sables de l'Olonne
1st, Circuit des As de l'Ouest
3rd, National Road Race Championship
3rd, GP Wolber
1927
France Road Race Champion
1st, Stage 5, Tour de France
1st, Stages 2 & 6, Volta a Catalunya
6th, Paris–Tours
7th, Bordeaux–Paris
1928
France Road Race Champion
8th, World Road Race Championship
1929
7th, World Road Race Championship
7th, Paris–Tours
1930
1st, GP Poitiers
3rd, National Road Race Championship
1931
1st, Rennes-Paris-Rennes
1st, Circuit de l'Aulne
(silver) World Road Race Championship
1932
1st, Circuit de l'Aulne
7th, Bordeaux–Paris
