= Debusschere =

Debusschere (and variants) is a surname. Notable people with such a name include:

- Dave DeBusschere (1940-2003), American basketball player and coach, and baseball player
- Jean De Busschere (1900-1987), Belgian cyclist
- Jens Debusschere (born 1989), Belgian cyclist
