= Hemelsoet =

Hemelsoet is a surname. Notable people with the surname include:

- Joseph Hemelsoet (1905–?), Belgian racing cyclist
- Maurice Hemelsoet (1875–1943), Belgian rower and Olympian
