= Jules Moineau =

Julien Moineau may refer to:

- Jules Moineau (anarchist), anarchist and signatory of the Manifesto of the Sixteen
- Julien Moineau (1903–1980), French road bicycle racer
