= Antoine Giacomasso =

French cyclist

Personal information
- Born: 10 September 1904
- Died: 19 July 1987 (aged 82)

Cycling career
- Sport: Cycling
- Discipline: Road
- Role: Rider

Antoine Giacomasso (10 September 1904 – 19 July 1987) was a French racing cyclist. He rode in the 1927 Tour de France.
