= Victor Berthy =

French cyclist

Personal information
- Born: 31 January 1904
- Died: 27 February 1989 (aged 85)

Cycling career
- Sport: Cycling
- Discipline: Road
- Role: Rider

Victor Berthy (31 January 1904 – 27 February 1989) was a French racing cyclist. He rode in the 1927 Tour de France.
