= Guilbert Bled =

French cyclist

Personal information
- Born: 20 June 1895
- Died: 31 October 1940 (aged 45)

Cycling career
- Sport: Cycling
- Discipline: Road
- Role: Rider

Guilbert Bled (20 June 1895 – 31 October 1940) was a French racing cyclist. He rode in the 1927 Tour de France.
