= 1926 Paris–Roubaix =

Cycling race

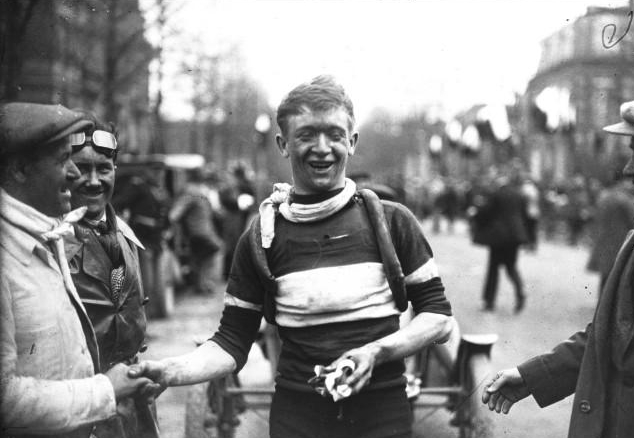
- Race winner Julien Delbecque at the finish line

Race details
- Dates: 4 April 1926
- Stages: 1
- Distance: 270 km (167.8 mi)
- Winning time: 7h 24' 42"

Results
	Winner	Julien Delbecque (BEL)
	Second	Gustaaf Van Slembrouck (BEL)
	Third	Gaston Rebry (BEL)

The 1926 Paris–Roubaix was the 27th edition of the Paris–Roubaix, a classic one-day cycle race in France. The single day event was held on 4 April 1926 and stretched 270 km (168 mi) from Paris to its end in a velodrome in Roubaix. The winner was Julien Delbecque from Belgium.

== Results ==
Final results (1–10)
Rank	Cyclist	Time
1	Julien Delbecque (BEL)	7h 24' 42″
2	Gustaaf Van Slembrouck (BEL)	+0' 00″
3	Gaston Rebry (BEL)	+0' 58″
4	Lode Eelen (BEL)	+0' 00″
5	Kastor Notter (SUI)	+4' 08″
6	Henri Pélissier (FRA)	+4' 18″
7	Félix Sellier (BEL)	+5' 01″
8	Marcel Colleu (FRA)	+7' 50″
9	Camille Van de Casteele (BEL)	+10' 16″
10	Adelin Benoit (BEL)	+10' 16″
