= Henri Lintzen =

Belgian cyclist

Personal information
- Born: 5 December 1896

Cycling career
- Sport: Cycling
- Discipline: Road
- Role: Rider

Henri Lintzen (born 5 December 1896, date of death unknown) was a Belgian racing cyclist. He rode in the 1927 Tour de France.
