= Émile Lambiel =

Swiss cyclist

Emile Lambiel
Personal information
- Born: 21 August 1899

Cycling career
- Sport: Cycling
- Discipline: Road
- Role: Rider

Emile Lambiel (born 21 August 1899, date of death unknown) was a Swiss racing cyclist. He rode in the 1927 Tour de France.
