= 1923 Paris–Roubaix =

Cycling race

Race details
- Dates: 1 April 1923
- Stages: 1
- Distance: 270 km (167.8 mi)
- Winning time: 8h 58' 15"

Results
	Winner	Heiri Suter (SUI)
	Second	René Vermandel (BEL)
	Third	Félix Sellier (BEL)

The 1923 Paris–Roubaix was the 24th edition of the Paris–Roubaix, a classic one-day cycle race in France. The single day event was held on 1 April 1923 and stretched 270 km (168 mi) from Paris to its end in a velodrome in Roubaix. The winner was Heiri Suter from Switzerland.

== Results ==
Final results (1–10)
Rank	Cyclist	Time
1	Heiri Suter (SUI)	8h 58' 15″
2	René Vermandel (BEL)	+0' 00″
3	Félix Sellier (BEL)	+0' 00″
4	Theofiel Beeckman (BEL)	+0' 00″
5	Charles Lacquehay (FRA)	+0' 00″
6	Marcel Huot (FRA)	+0' 00″
