= Albert Courtot =

French cyclist

Personal information
- Born: 4 May 1891
- Died: 7 January 1955 (aged 63)

Cycling career
- Sport: Cycling
- Discipline: Road
- Role: Rider

Albert Courtot (French: [filip kuʁto]; 4 May 1891 – 7 January 1955) was a French racing cyclist. He rode in the 1927 Tour de France.
