= 1923 Tour of Flanders =

7th Tour of Flanders
Race details
- Dates: 18 March 1923
- Stages: 1
- Distance: 243 km (151.0 mi)
- Winning time: 9h 16' 15"

Results
	Winner	Heiri Suter (SUI)	(Gurtner–Hutchinson)
	Second	Charles Deruyter (BEL)	(Gurtner–Hutchinson)
	Third	Albert Dejonghe (BEL)	(La Française)

The seventh running of the Tour of Flanders cycling classic was held on Sunday, 18 March 1923. Swiss rider Heiri Suter won the race in a three-man sprint with Belgians Charles Deruyter and Albert Dejonghe. Suter became the first non-Belgian winner of the Tour of Flanders. 43 of 86 riders finished.

== Route ==
Video summary of the race

The race started and finished in Ghent – totaling 243 km. The course featured two categorized climbs:

- Tiegemberg
- Kwaremont

== Results ==
Result
Rank	Rider	Team	Time
1	Heiri Suter (SUI)	Gurtner–Hutchinson	9h 16' 15"
2	Charles De Ruyter (BEL)	Gurtner–Hutchinson	s.t.
3	Albert Dejonghe (BEL)	La Française	s.t.
4	Jules Van Hevel (BEL)	Buysse–Colonial	+ 1' 25"
5	Théophile Beeckman (BEL)	Griffon–Dunlop	+ 1' 55"
6	Émile Masson (BEL)	Alcyon–Dunlop	s.t.
7	Jean Rossius (BEL)	La Française	+ 2'35"
8	Charles Juseret (BEL)	Peugeot–Wolber	s.t.
9	Nicolas Frantz (LUX)	Thomann–Dunlop	+ 2' 40"
10	Denis Verschueren (BEL)	Wolber–Dunlop	+ 5' 00"
