= Heiri Suter =

Swiss cyclist

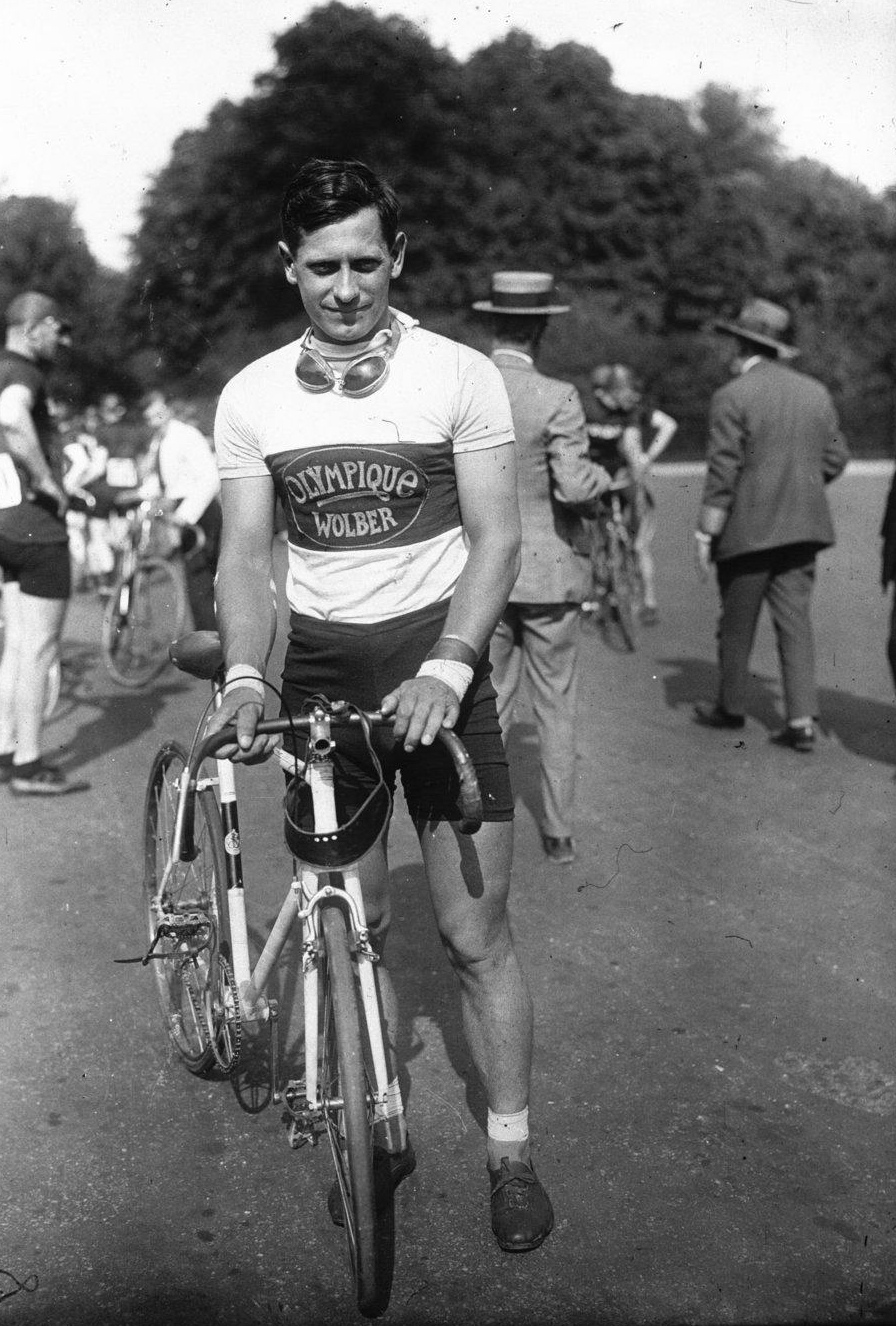
- Heiri Suter in 1926

Personal information
- Born: 10 July 1899 Gränichen, Switzerland
- Died: 6 November 1978 (aged 79) Bülach, Switzerland

Cycling career
- Sport: Cycling
- Role: Rider

Heinrich 'Heiri' Suter (10 July 1899 – 6 November 1978) was a Swiss road racing cyclist. Excelling mainly in the classics, Suter was the first non-Belgian winner of the Tour of Flanders in 1923. Two weeks after his win in the Tour of Flanders, he won Paris–Roubaix, becoming the first cyclist to win both classics in the same year. He also holds a record six victories in Züri-Metzgete, Switzerland's most important one-day race.

Suter won 58 professional races, including:

- Grand Prix Wolber (unofficial world championship): (1922, 1925)
- Road champion of Switzerland: (1920, 1921, 1922, 1926, 1929)
- motor-paced champion of Switzerland: (1932, 1933)
- Züri-Metzgete: (1919, 1920, 1922, 1924, 1928, 1929)
- Paris–Roubaix: (1923)
- Tour of Flanders: (1923)
- Bordeaux–Paris (1925)
- Paris–Tours: (1926, 1927)

== Career ==
1919
1st – Züri-Metzgete
1st — Grand Prix Aurore
1st — Tour de Zürich
1920
Switzerland National road champion
1st – Züri-Metzgete
1st — Tour du Nord-Ouest
1921
Switzerland National road champion
1st — Grand Prix Aurore
1st — Tour de Zürich
1st — Tour du Nord-Ouest
1st — Genève-Zürich
1st — Tour de Suisse Orientale
1st — Prix de Genève
1922
1st – Grand Prix Wolber
Switzerland National road champion
1st – Züri-Metzgete
1st — Tour du Nord-Ouest
1st — Circuit de Neuchâtel
1st — Circuit de Fribourg
1st — Circuit du Vaudois
1st — Munich-Zürich
1st, 2 stages — Paris-Saint-Etienne
1923
1st – Tour of Flanders
1st – Paris–Roubaix
1st — Tour du Nord-Ouest
1st — Zürich-Munich
1st — Prix de Genève
1924
1st – Züri-Metzgete
1st — Circuit de Champagne (1st, 2 Stages)
1st — Tour du Lac Léman
1st — Grand Prix Griffon
1st — Zürich-La Chaux-de-Fonds
1st, 3 stages — Bordeaux-Marseille
1st — Prix de Genève
1925
1st – Grand Prix Wolber
1st – Bordeaux–Paris
1st — Circuit de Champagne
1st — Circuit du Vaudois
1926
Switzerland National road champion
1st – Paris–Tours
1st — Tour de Cologne
1st — Circuit de Cologne
1st — Tour de Francfort
1st — Tour du Württemberg
1st — Circuit de la Montagne
1st — Grand Prix Yverdon
1927
1st – Paris–Tours
1st — Tour du Lac Léman
1st — Grand Prix Yverdon
1st — Tour de Francfort
1928
1st – Züri-Metzgete
1929
Switzerland National road champion
1st – Züri-Metzgete
1st — Tour du Nord-Ouest
1st — Tour du Lac Léman
1st — Circuit Franco-Suisse
1932
Switzerland National motor-paced champion
1933
Switzerland National motor-paced champion
