= Henry Tosseng =

Luxembourgish cyclist

Personal information
- Born: 25 November 1900 Consthum, Luxembourg
- Died: January 1972

Cycling career
- Sport: Cycling
- Discipline: Road
- Role: Rider

Henry Tosseng (25 November 1900 – January 1972) was a Luxembourgish racing cyclist. He rode in the 1927 Tour de France.
