= Giovanni Grespan (cyclist) =

Italian cyclist

Personal information
- Born: 23 May 1899

Cycling career
- Sport: Cycling
- Discipline: Road
- Role: Rider

Giovanni Grespan (born 23 May 1899, date of death unknown) was an Italian racing cyclist. He rode in the 1928 Tour de France.
