= Pierre Le Doaré =

French cyclist

Personal information
- Born: 6 April 1900
- Died: 7 November 1934 (aged 34)

Cycling career
- Sport: Cycling
- Discipline: Road
- Role: Rider

Pierre Le Doaré (6 April 1900 – 7 November 1934) was a French racing cyclist. He rode in the 1928 Tour de France.
