= Giuseppe Rivella =

Italian cyclist

Personal information
- Born: 16 November 1901
- Died: 30 September 1963 (aged 61)

Cycling career
- Sport: Cycling
- Discipline: Road
- Role: Rider

Giuseppe Rivella (16 November 1901 – 30 September 1963) was an Italian racing cyclist. He rode in the 1927 Tour de France.
