= Alfredo Francini =

Italian cyclist

Personal information
- Born: 23 May 1905

Cycling career
- Sport: Cycling
- Discipline: Road
- Role: Rider

Alfredo Francini (born 23 May 1905, date of death unknown) was an Italian racing cyclist. He rode in the 1927 Tour de France.
