= Valentin Halattre =

French cyclist

Personal information
- Born: 6 November 1904 Mantes, France
- Died: 19 February 1961 (aged 56) Saint-Denis, France

Cycling career
- Sport: Cycling
- Discipline: Road
- Role: Rider

Valentin Halattre (6 November 1904 – 19 February 1961) was a French racing cyclist. He rode in the 1928 Tour de France.
