= Félix Baud =

French cyclist (1901–1996)

Personal information
- Born: 21 July 1901
- Died: 4 November 1996 (aged 95)

Cycling career
- Sport: Cycling
- Discipline: Road
- Role: Rider

Félix Baud (21 July 1901 – 4 November 1996) was a French racing cyclist. He rode in the 1928 Tour de France.
