= Eugène Archambault =

French cyclist

Personal information
- Born: 14 May 1898 Juigné-sur-Sarthe, France
- Died: 22 November 1974 (aged 76) Paris, France

Cycling career
- Sport: Cycling
- Discipline: Road
- Role: Rider

Eugène Archambault (14 May 1898 – 22 November 1974) was a French racing cyclist. He rode in the 1928 Tour de France.
