= Émile Druz =

French cyclist

Personal information
- Born: 22 May 1891

Cycling career
- Sport: Cycling
- Discipline: Road
- Role: Rider

Émile Druz (born 22 May 1891, date of death unknown) was a French racing cyclist. He rode in the 1927 Tour de France.
