= Pierre Gueroult =

French cyclist

Personal information
- Born: 1905

Cycling career
- Sport: Cycling
- Discipline: Road
- Role: Rider

Pierre Gueroult (born 1905, date of death unknown) was a French racing cyclist. He rode in the 1928 Tour de France.
