= Pierre Claes =

Belgian cyclist

Personal information
- Born: 23 October 1901
- Died: 24 May 1989 (aged 87)

Cycling career
- Sport: Cycling
- Discipline: Road
- Role: Rider

Pierre Claes (23 October 1901 – 24 May 1989) was a Belgian racing cyclist. He rode in the 1927 Tour de France.
