= David Wybon =

Belgian cyclist

Personal information
- Born: 19 November 1904
- Died: 11 September 1995 (aged 90)

Cycling career
- Sport: Cycling
- Discipline: Road
- Role: Rider

David Wybon (19 November 1904 – 11 September 1995) was a Belgian racing cyclist. He rode in the 1928 Tour de France.
