= Casimir Lombardi =

French cyclist

Personal information
- Born: 9 January 1901
- Died: 18 June 1974 (aged 73)

Cycling career
- Sport: Cycling
- Discipline: Road
- Role: Rider

Casimir Lombardi (9 January 1901 – 18 June 1974) was a French racing cyclist. He rode in the 1928 Tour de France.
