= Kamiel Segers =

Belgian cyclist

Personal information
- Born: 24 December 1900
- Died: 31 December 1964 (aged 64)

Cycling career
- Sport: Cycling
- Discipline: Road
- Role: Rider

Kamiel Segers (24 December 1900 – 31 December 1964) was a Belgian racing cyclist. He rode in the 1927 Tour de France.
