= Gaston Corbiere =

French cyclist

Personal information
- Born: 11 July 1900
- Died: 24 December 1968 (aged 68)

Cycling career
- Sport: Cycling
- Discipline: Road
- Role: Rider

Gaston Corbiere (11 July 1900 – 24 December 1968) was a French racing cyclist. He rode in the 1927 Tour de France.
