= Marius Rouvier =

French cyclist

Personal information
- Born: 31 July 1903
- Died: 30 November 1981 (aged 78)

Cycling career
- Sport: Cycling
- Discipline: Road
- Role: Rider

Marius Rouvier (31 July 1903 – 30 November 1981) was a French racing cyclist. He rode in the 1927 Tour de France.
