= René Crepin =

French cyclist

Personal information
- Born: 2 January 1899 Glageon, France
- Died: 5 November 1976 (aged 77)

Cycling career
- Sport: Cycling
- Discipline: Road
- Role: Rider

René Crepin (3 January 1899 – 5 November 1976) was a French racing cyclist. He rode in the 1928 Tour de France.
