= Jacques Pfister =

French cyclist

Personal information
- Full name: Jacques Pfister
- Born: 30 May 1903
- Died: 21 March 1968 (aged 64)

Cycling career
- Sport: Cycling
- Role: Rider

Jacques Pfister (30 May 1903 – 21 March 1968) was a French racing cyclist. He finished in last place in the 1927 Tour de France.
