= Luigi Bavini =

Italian cyclist

Personal information
- Born: 13 July 1899

Cycling career
- Sport: Cycling
- Discipline: Road
- Role: Rider

Luigi Bavini (born 13 July 1899, date of death unknown) was an Italian racing cyclist. He rode in the 1928 Tour de France.
