= Auguste Baumans =

Belgian cyclist

Personal information
- Born: 26 October 1902

Cycling career
- Sport: Cycling
- Discipline: Road
- Role: Rider

Auguste Baumans (born 26 October 1902, date of death unknown) was a Belgian racing cyclist. He rode in the 1928 Tour de France.
