= Georges Brosteaux =

Belgian cyclist

Personal information
- Born: 2 January 1902
- Died: 13 November 1959 (aged 57)

Cycling career
- Sport: Cycling
- Discipline: Road
- Role: Rider

Georges Brosteaux (2 January 1902 – 13 November 1959) was a Belgian racing cyclist. He rode in the 1927 Tour de France.
