= GP Wolber =

Race details
- Date: Late September/early October (1930 and 1931 in June)
- Region: France
- Type: One-day race

History
- First edition: 1922
- Editions: 10
- Final edition: 1939 or later
- First winner: Heiri Suter (SUI)
- Most wins: Heiri Suter (SUI)
- Final winner: Romain Gijssels (BEL)

The GP Wolber was a French cycling event in the 1920s. It was considered a kind of unofficial World Championship. Only cyclists who finished in the top-3 of the major French, Italian, Belgian and Swiss races were invited. The first GP Wolber was held in 1922. When the World Cycling Championship was introduced in 1927 the race started to lose prestige. The race ran until at least 1939.

== Palmares ==
Year	Rider
1922	Heiri Suter (SUI)
1923	Emile Masson Sr. (BEL)
1924	Costante Girardengo (ITA)
1925	Heiri Suter (SUI)
1926	Francis Pélissier (FRA)
1927	(France) Alleluia Team
1928	Julien Vervaecke (BEL)
1929	Alfred Hamerlinck (BEL)
1930	Georges Ronsse (BEL)
1931	Romain Gijssels (BEL)
1939	Victor Codron (FRA)
