= Julien Delbecque =

Belgian cyclist

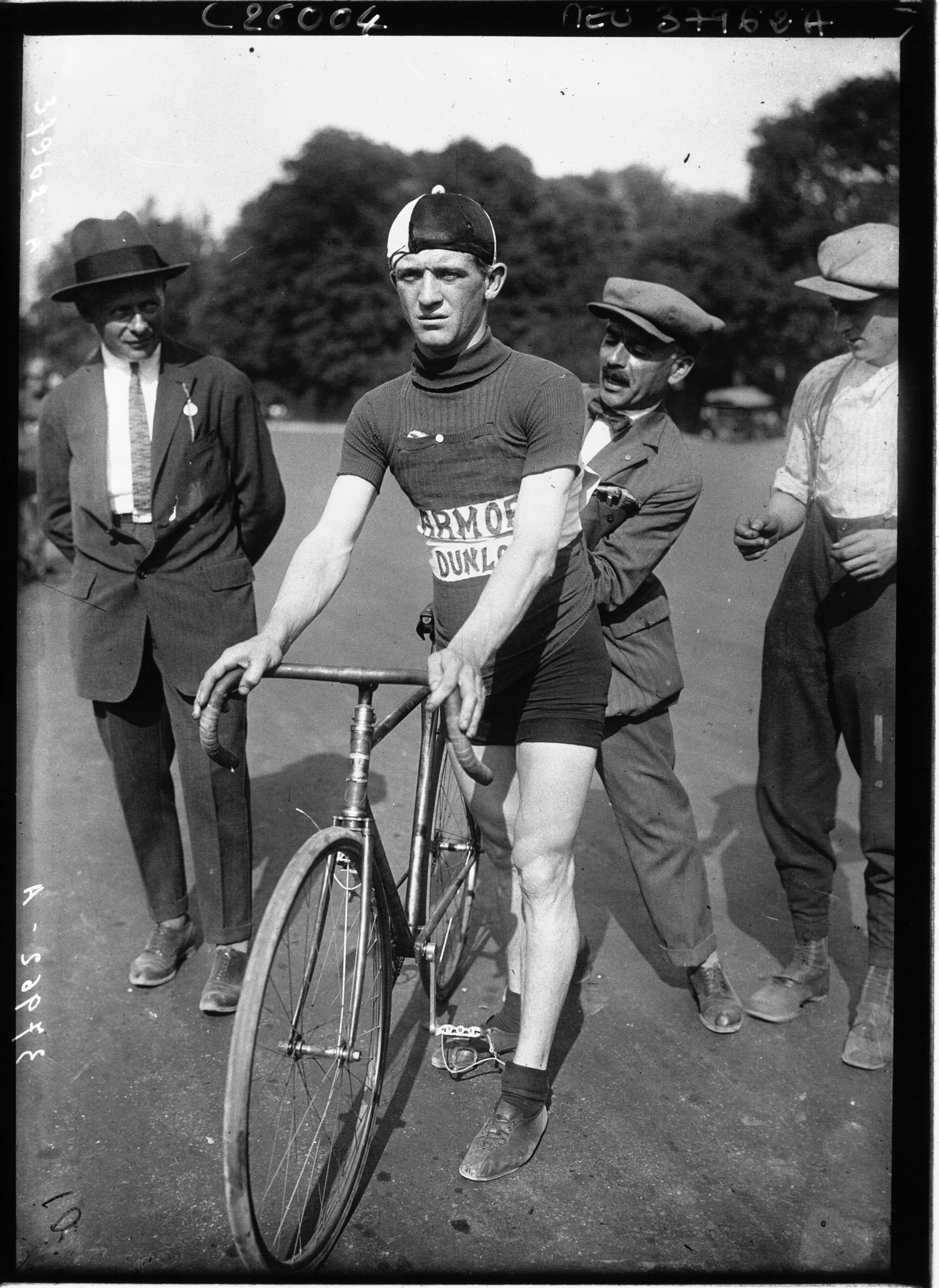
- Delbecque in 1926

Personal information
- Born: 1 September 1903 Harelbeke, Belgium
- Died: 22 October 1977 (aged 74) Kortrijk, Belgium

Cycling career
- Sport: Cycling
- Role: Rider

Julien Delbecque (1 September 1903 – 22 October 1977) was a Belgian racing cyclist. He won the 1925 Tour of Flanders and the 1926 Paris–Roubaix.
