= Yves Ropartz =

French cyclist

Personal information
- Born: 3 June 1903
- Died: 19 December 1983 (aged 80)

Cycling career
- Sport: Cycling
- Discipline: Road
- Role: Rider

Yves Ropartz (3 June 1903 – 19 December 1983) was a French racing cyclist. He rode in the 1928 Tour de France.
