= Marcel Gendrin =

French cyclist

Personal information
- Born: 16 March 1904
- Died: 22 June 1957 (aged 53)

Cycling career
- Sport: Cycling
- Discipline: Road
- Role: Rider

Marcel Gendrin (16 March 1904 – 22 June 1957) was a French racing cyclist. He rode in the 1927 Tour de France.
