= Léon Martin =

Belgian cyclist

Personal information
- Born: 30 April 1897
- Died: 11 October 1956 (aged 59)

Cycling career
- Sport: Cycling
- Discipline: Road
- Role: Rider

Léon Martin (30 April 1897 – 11 October 1956) was a Belgian racing cyclist. He rode in the 1927 Tour de France.
