= François Menta =

French cyclist

Personal information
- Born: 21 November 1903
- Died: 17 July 1981 (aged 77)

Cycling career
- Sport: Cycling
- Discipline: Road
- Role: Rider

François Menta (21 November 1903 – 17 July 1981) was a French racing cyclist. He rode in the 1927 Tour de France.
