= André Devauchelle =

French cyclist (1904–1972)

Personal information
- Born: 17 August 1904 Versailles, France
- Died: 22 December 1972 (aged 68)

Cycling career
- Sport: Cycling
- Discipline: Road
- Role: Rider

André Devauchelle (17 August 1904 – 22 December 1972) was a French racing cyclist. He rode in the 1927 Tour de France.
