= Francis Pélissier =

French cyclist

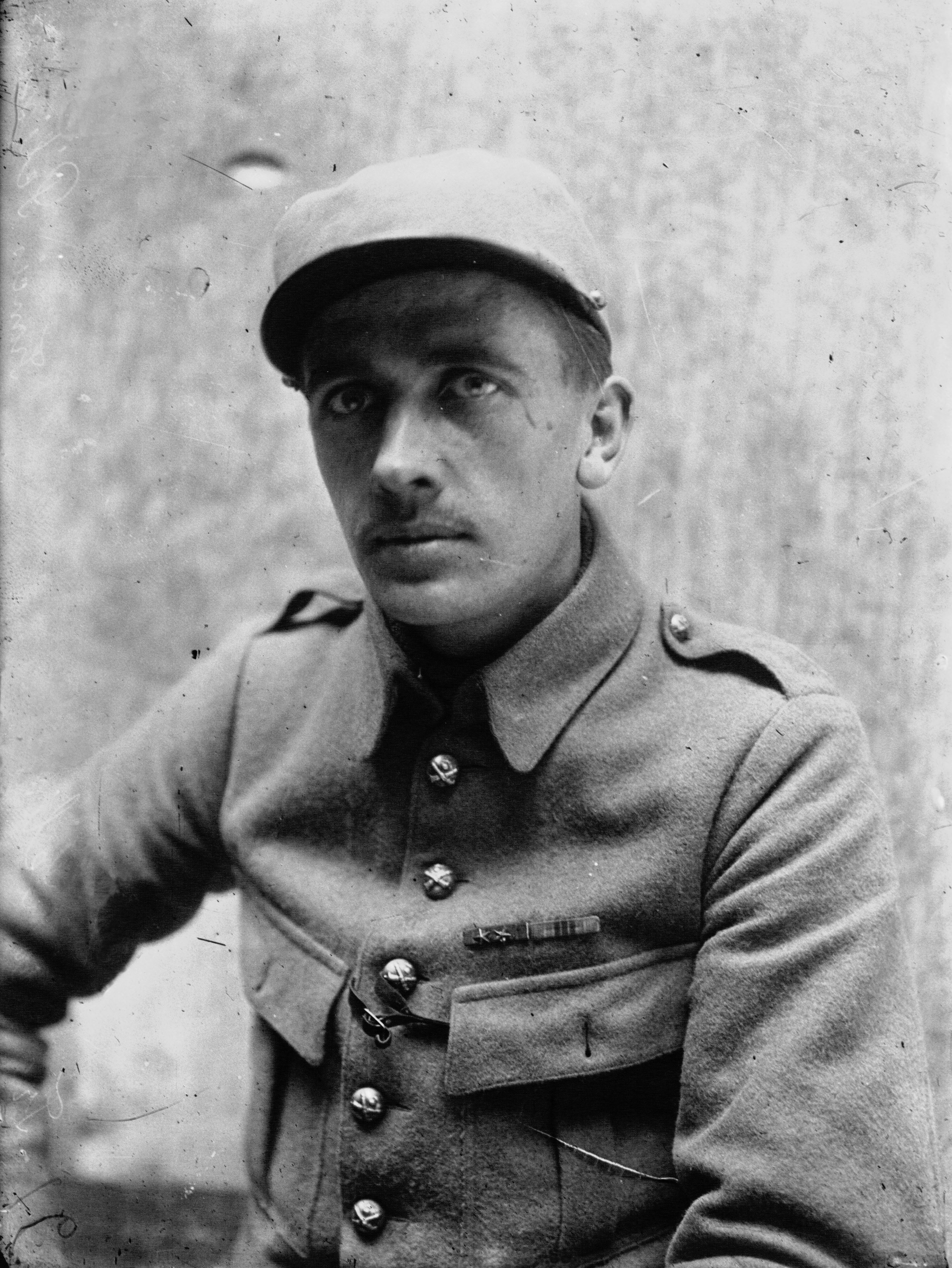

Personal information
- Full name: Francis Pélissier
- Nicknames: Le Grand; Le Sorcier de Bordeaux–Paris (The Bordeaux-Paris Wizard)
- Born: 13 June 1894 Paris, France
- Died: 22 February 1959 (aged 64) Mantes-la-Jolie, France

Cycling career
- Sport: Cycling
- Discipline: Road
- Role: Rider

Professional teams
- 1919–1923: JB Louvet
- 1924–1925: Automoto
- 1926–1928: Dilecta-Wolber
- 1929–1931: JB Louvet
- 1932: Alleluia-Wolber

Major wins
- Grand Tours Tour de France 2 individual stages (1919, 1927) One-day races and Classics National Road Race Championships (1921, 1923, 1924) Grand Prix Wolber (1926) Paris–Tours (1921) Bordeaux–Paris (1922, 1924)

Francis Pélissier (13 June 1894 – 22 February 1959) was a French professional road racing cyclist from Paris. He was the younger brother of Tour de France winner Henri Pélissier, and the older brother of Tour de France stage winner Charles Pélissier. He won several classic cycle races like Paris–Tours, Bordeaux–Paris and Grand Prix Wolber. He also won the French National Road Race Championship three times (1921, 1923 and 1924) as well as two stages at the Tour de France.

== Major results ==
1919
Tour de France:

Winner stage 3

Nancy-Brussels
1920
Tour du Sud-Est
1921
Circuit Aisne-Oise
France national road race champion
Paris–Tours
1922
Bordeaux–Paris
1923
France national road race champion
1924
France national road race champion
Bordeaux–Paris
Tour of the Basque Country
1926
GP Wolber
Critérium des As
Critérium International de Cyclo-cross, Cyclo-cross
1927
Tour de France:

Winner stage 1
Wearing yellow jersey for five days

== See also ==
- List of doping cases in cycling
