= Omer Mahy =

Belgian cyclist

Personal information
- Born: 4 August 1895
- Died: 15 June 1980 (aged 84)

Cycling career
- Sport: Cycling
- Discipline: Road
- Role: Rider

Omer Mahy (4 August 1895 – 15 June 1980) was a Belgian racing cyclist. He rode in the 1927 Tour de France.
