= Julien Moineau =

French cyclist

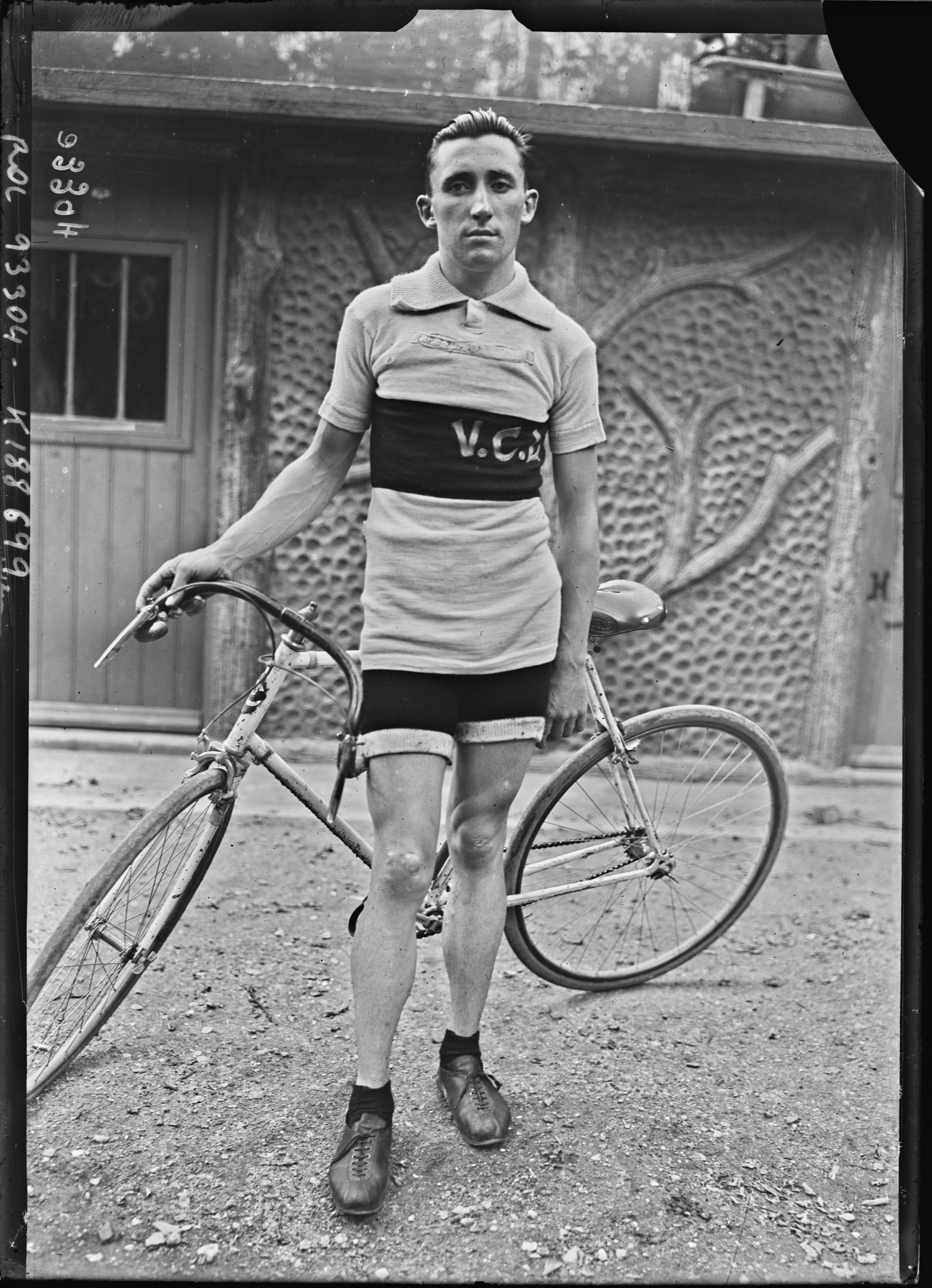
- Julien Moineau, 1924

Personal information
- Full name: Julien Moineau
- Born: 27 November 1903 Clichy, France
- Died: 14 March 1980 (aged 76) La Teste-de-Buch, France

Cycling career
- Sport: Cycling
- Discipline: Road
- Role: Rider

Major wins
- 3 stages Tour de France

Julien Moineau (Clichy, 27 November 1903 — La Teste, 14 March 1980) was a French professional road bicycle racer, who won three stages in the Tour de France. Julien Moineau was the father of cyclist Alain Moineau.

== Major results ==
1927
Circuit de Bourgogne
Paris-Le Havre
Tour de France:

8th place overall classification

GP Wolber
1928
Tour de France:

winner stage 14

1929
Circuit de la Mayenne
Tour de France:

winner stage 8

1930
Circuit du Forez
Paris-Limoges
1932
Paris-Limoges
Paris–Tours
1933
Paris-Limoges
1935
Tour de France:

winner stage 17
