= Pé Verhaegen =

Belgian cyclist

- Verhaegen in 1928

Personal information
- Full name: Petrus Verhaegen
- Born: 20 February 1902 Belgium
- Died: 5 April 1958 (aged 56)

Cycling career
- Sport: Cycling
- Discipline: Road/Cyclo-cross
- Role: Rider

Major wins
- 3 stages Tour de France

Petrus "Pé" Verhaegen (20 February 1902, Tremelo — 5 April 1958, Leuven) was a Belgian professional road bicycle racer.

== Major results ==
1925
Belgium national cyclo-cross championship
1926
Ronde van Vlaanderen for amateurs
1927
Tour de France:

Winner stages 10 and 17
7th place overall classification

1928
Tour de France:

Winner stage 4
16th place overall classification

1929
Paris–Brussels
1932
Zottegem
1933
Ronde van Haspengouw
1934
Vaals
