= Michele Gordini =

Italian cyclist

Personal information
- Born: 23 April 1896
- Died: 22 February 1970 (aged 73)

Cycling career
- Sport: Cycling
- Discipline: Road
- Role: Rider

Michele Gordini (23 April 1896 – 22 February 1970) was an Italian racing cyclist. He rode in the 1925 Tour de France.
