= Gustaaf Van Slembrouck =

Belgian cyclist

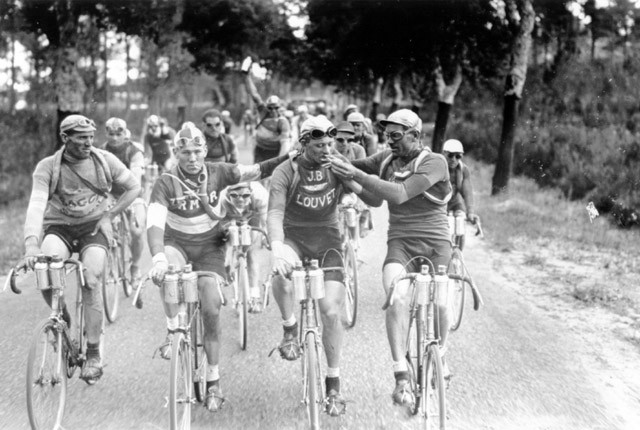

Personal information
- Full name: Gustaaf Van Slembrouck
- Born: 25 March 1902 Ostend, Belgium
- Died: 7 July 1968 (aged 66) Ostend, Belgium

Cycling career
- Sport: Cycling
- Discipline: Road
- Role: Rider

Major wins
- 4 Tour de France stages

Gustaaf Van Slembrouck (25 March 1902, Ostend – 7 July 1968, Ostend) was a Belgian professional cyclist from 1926 to 1934, nicknamed 'Den Staf'. He won 4 Tour de France stages, and wore the yellow jersey for 6 days in 1926. He finished in second place in the 1926 Paris–Roubaix.

== Major results ==
1926
Tour de France:

Winner stage 3

Tour of Flanders:

2nd place

1927
Tour de France:

Winner stages 7 and 12

Tour of Flanders:

2nd place

1929
Tour de France:

Winner stage 5

1932
De Panne
Erembodegem-Terjoden
