= Raymond Decorte =

Belgian cyclist

- Decorte in 1932

Personal information
- Full name: Raymond Decorte
- Born: 17 March 1898 Waarschoot, Belgium
- Died: 30 March 1972 (aged 74)

Cycling career
- Sport: Cycling
- Discipline: Road
- Role: Rider

Major wins
- 2 stages 1927 Tour de France

Raymond Decorte (Waarschoot, 17 March 1898 — Waarschoot, 30 March 1972) was a Belgian professional road bicycle racer. In the 1927 Tour de France, he won two stages and finished 11th in the general classification.

== Major results ==
1927
1927 Tour de France:

Winner stages 8 and 20
11th place overall classification

1931
Kruishoutem
