= Jean De Busschere =

Belgian cyclist

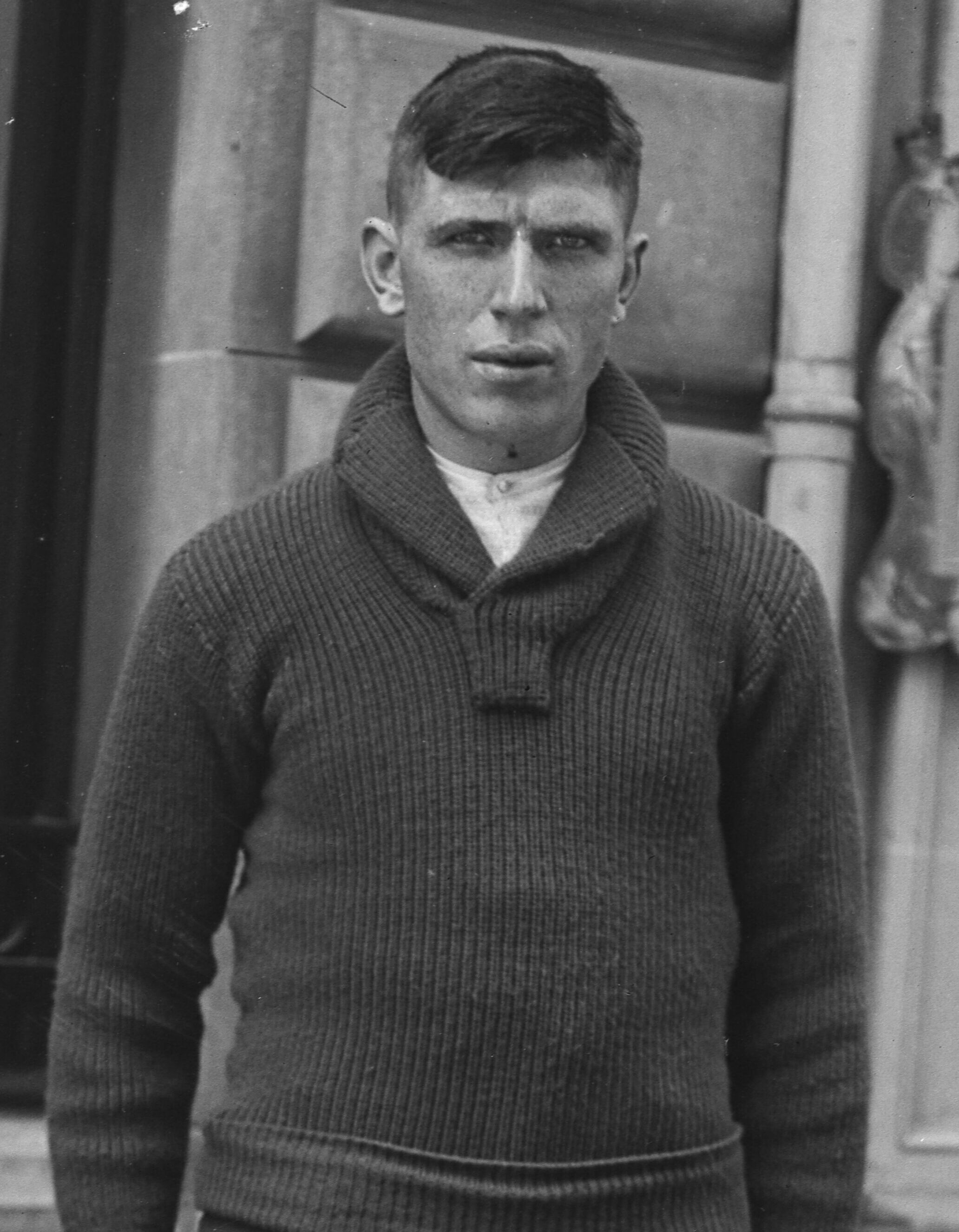
- De Busschere during the 1928 Tour de France

Personal information
- Born: 16 February 1900
- Died: 16 January 1987 (aged 86)

Cycling career
- Sport: Cycling
- Discipline: Road
- Role: Rider

Jean De Busschere (16 February 1900 – 16 January 1987) was a Belgian racing cyclist. He rode in the 1926 Tour de France.
