= Joseph Hemelsoet =

Belgian cyclist

Personal information
- Born: 18 March 1905

Cycling career
- Sport: Cycling
- Discipline: Road
- Role: Rider

Joseph Hemelsoet (born 18 March 1905, date of death unknown) was a Belgian racing cyclist. He rode in the 1927 Tour de France.
