= Albert Jordens =

Belgian cyclist

Personal information
- Born: 24 February 1902
- Died: 23 December 1949 (aged 47)

Cycling career
- Sport: Cycling
- Discipline: Road
- Role: Rider

Albert Jordens (24 February 1902 – 23 December 1949) was a Belgian racing cyclist. He rode in the 1925 Tour de France.
