= Julien Vervaecke =

Belgian cyclist

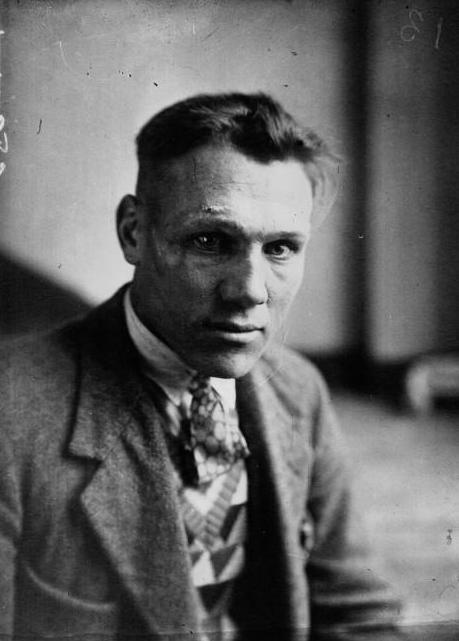

Personal information
- Full name: Julien Vervaecke
- Born: 3 November 1899 Dadizele, Belgium
- Died: May 1940 (aged 40) Roncq, France

Cycling career
- Sport: Cycling
- Discipline: Road
- Role: Rider

Major wins
- Paris–Roubaix; Paris–Brussels

Julien Vervaecke (3 November 1899 – May 1940) was a Belgian professional road bicycle racer. He won Paris–Roubaix, Paris–Brussels, 2 stages in the Tour de France and finished 3rd in the 1927 Tour de France. At the start of the Second World War Battle of Belgium, when a British army detachment withdrawing from the area and in the process of blowing up a bridge at Menen, where Vervaecke owned a restaurant. The British wanted to get furniture from the establishment in order to set up a roadblock, but he refused. The situation heated up because the bad temper of Vervaecke, added to the fact that he speak a poor English. He was arrested by the soldiers, taken to Park Torris in Roncq and shot dead. His body was found weeks later, so the exact date of his death is not known.

The Wehrmacht War Crimes Bureau investigated the case as an allied war crime.

Vervaecke was born in Dadizele, Belgium, and died in Roncq, France.

Julien's younger brother, Félicien Vervaecke, was also a successful cyclist.

== Major results ==
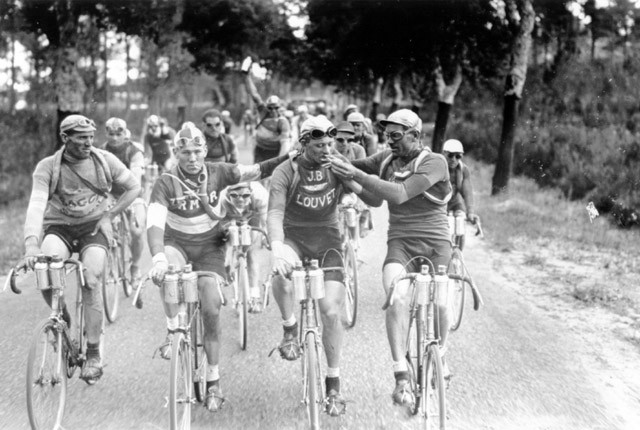
Julien Vervaecke and Maurice Geldhof smoking a cigarette at the 1927 Tour de France.

1927
Tour de France:

Winner stage 16
3rd place overall classification

1928
GP Wolber
Omloop van België
Tour de France:

5th place overall classification

1929
Tour de France:

Winner stage 15
8th place overall classification

1930
Paris–Roubaix
Tour de France:

6th place overall classification

1932
Paris–Brussels
1933
Berchem
Paris–Roubaix

2nd place overall
