= Maurice Geldhof =

Belgian cyclist

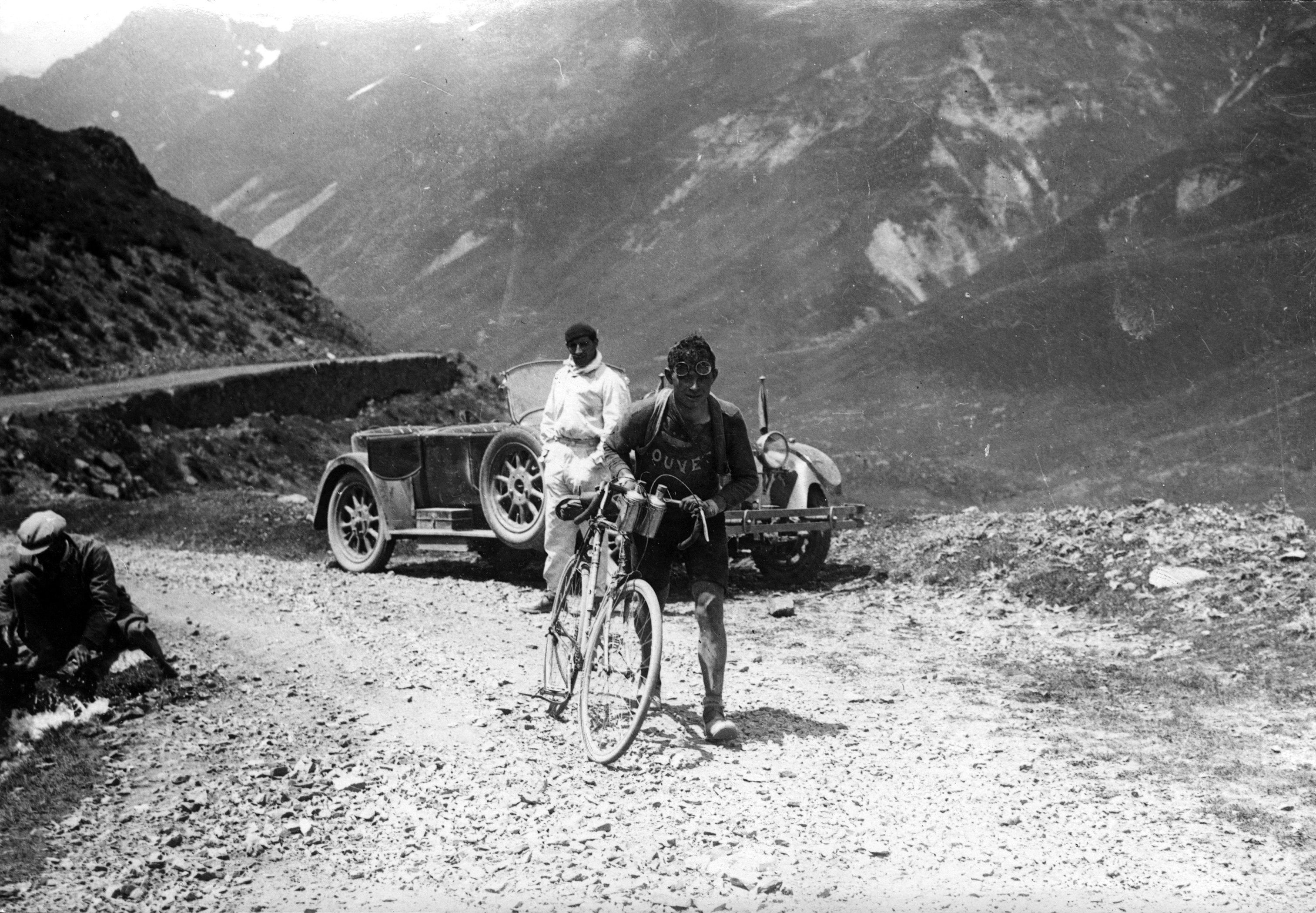
- climbing the Col d'Aubisque by foot

Personal information
- Full name: Maurice Geldhof
- Nickname: Pupe Visch
- Born: 22 October 1905 Moorslede, Belgium
- Died: 26 April 1970 (aged 64) Wevelgem, Belgium

Cycling career
- Sport: Cycling
- Discipline: Road
- Role: Rider

Major wins
- Grand Tours Tour de France 1 individual stage (1927)

Maurice Geldhof (22 October 1905 – 26 April 1970) was a Belgian professional road bicycle racer. In the 1927 Tour de France, he won the 19th stage.

== Major results ==
1927
Bordeaux-Toulouse
Tour de France:

Winner stage 19
10th place overall classification
