= Secondo Martinetto =

Italian cyclist

Personal information
- Born: 28 August 1894
- Died: 4 September 1968 (aged 74)

Cycling career
- Sport: Cycling
- Discipline: Road
- Role: Rider

Secondo Martinetto (28 August 1894 – 4 September 1968) was an Italian racing cyclist. He rode in the 1926 Tour de France.
