= Hector Martin (cyclist) =

Belgian cyclist

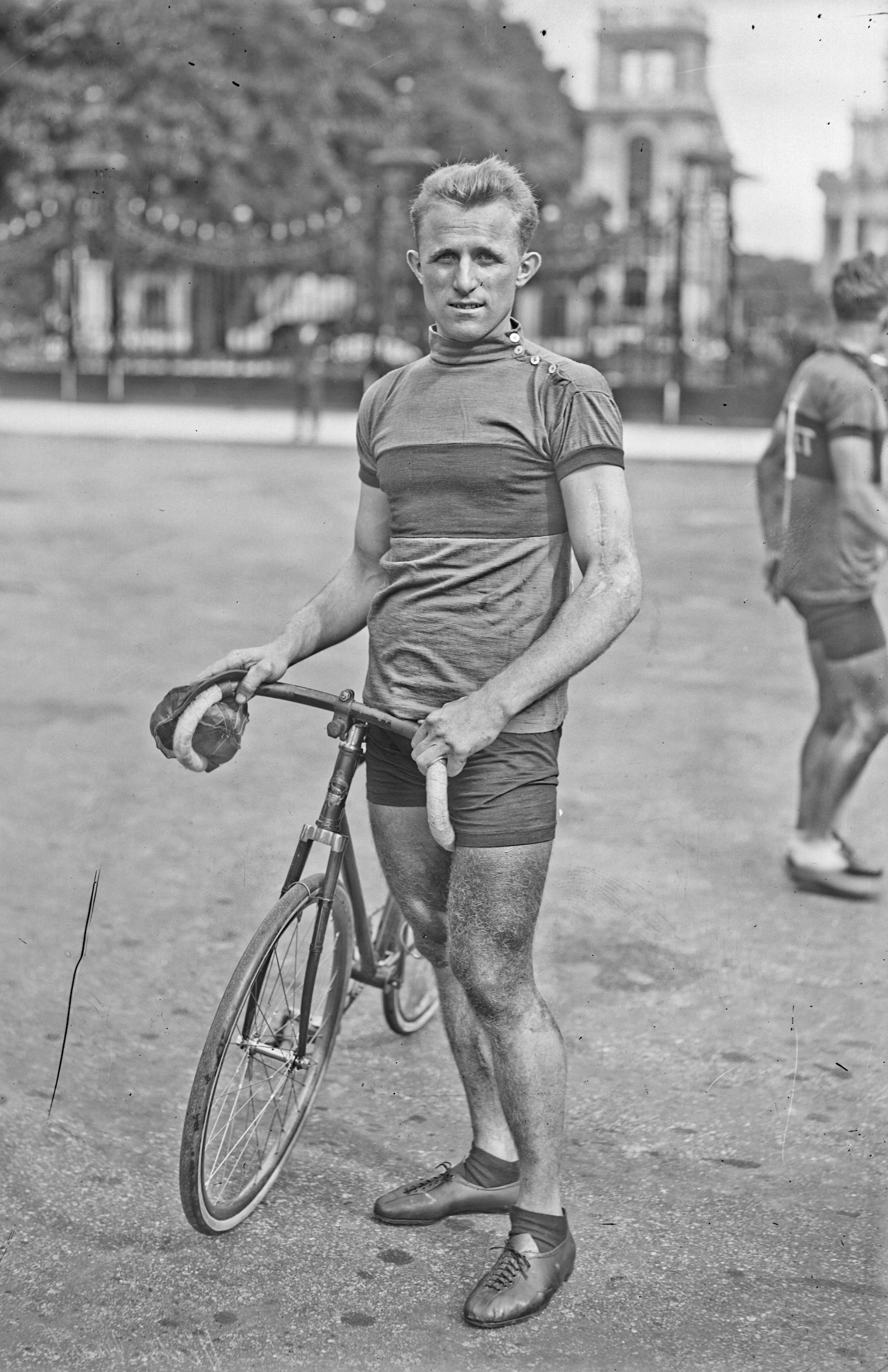

Personal information
- Full name: Hector Martin
- Born: 26 December 1898 Belgium
- Died: 9 August 1972 (aged 73)

Cycling career
- Sport: Cycling
- Discipline: Road
- Role: Rider

Major wins
- Tour de France 5 stages 4 days yellow jersey

Hector Martin (26 December 1898–9 August 1972) was a Belgian road racing cyclist, professional from 1925 to 1935. In 1924 he won the "Tour of Flanders for Independents" and the Belgian championship cycling for independents. From 1925 to 1935 he was a professional cyclist. In the 1927 Tour de France he won the third stage in Caen and the 22nd stage to Charleville and he wore the yellow jersey for 4 days. In 1928 he won Bordeaux-Paris and in 1929 he came second. In 1930 he won the Circuit de Béarn. He was the brother of Léon Martin.

Camiel Thomas fabricated cycling shoes and marketed them under Hector's name in 1939.

== Major results ==
1923
Brussel - Luxemburg - Mondorf
Melsele
1924
Binche - Tournai - Binche
Paris - Menin
Ronde van Vlaanderen for amateurs
Blankenberge
Belgium national road race championship for amateur
1925
Tour de France:

Winner stages 14, 16 and 17

1927
Tour de France:

Winner stages 3 and 22
Wearing yellow jersey for four days

1928
Bordeaux–Paris
1930
Circuit de Béarn
1931
Maldegem
