= 1927 Tour de France =

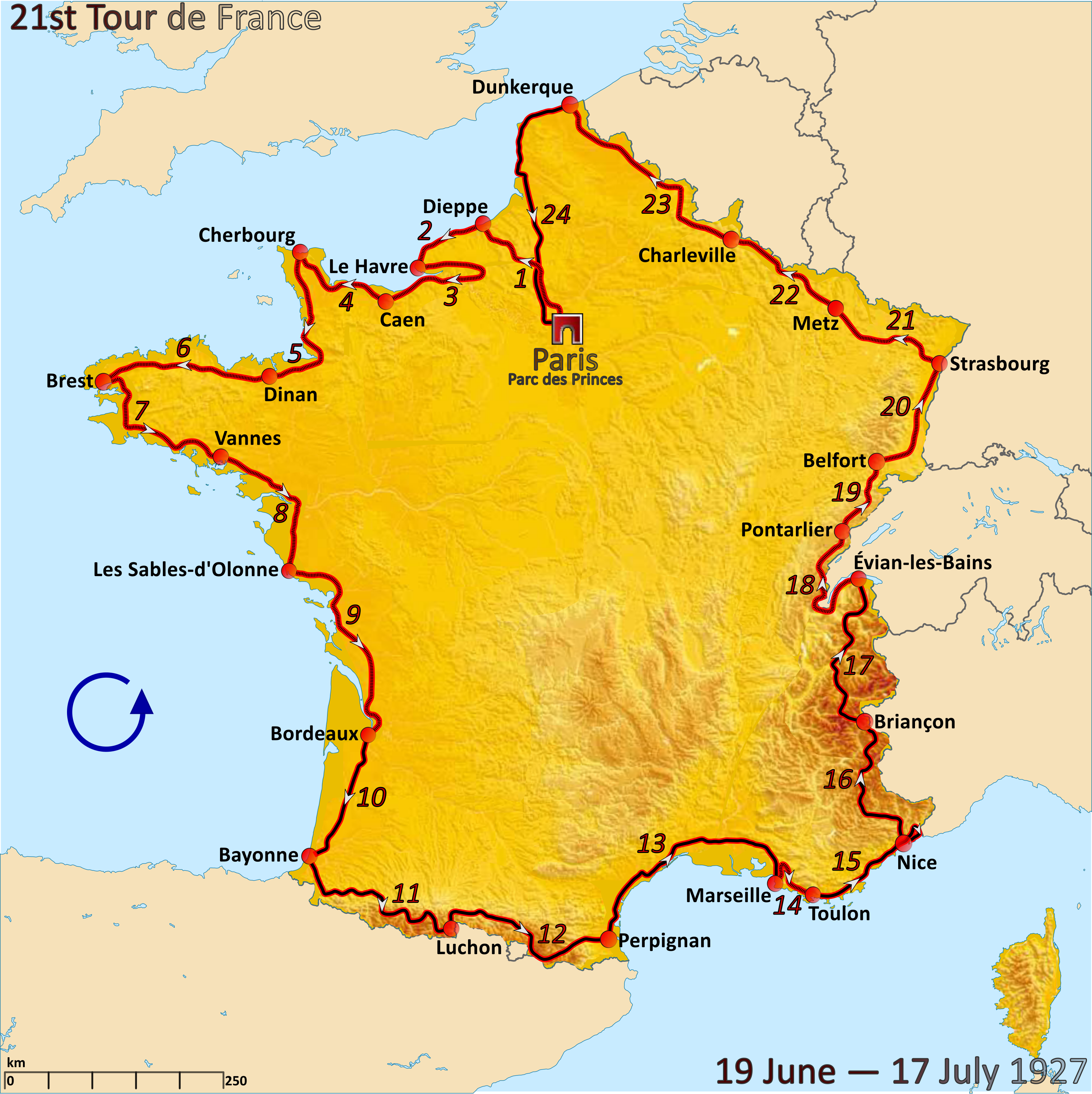
- Route of the 1927 Tour de France followed counterclockwise, starting in Paris

Race details
- Dates: 19 June – 17 July 1927
- Stages: 24
- Distance: 5,398 km (3,354 mi)
- Winning time: 198h 16' 42"

Results
Jersey awarded to the overall winner	Winner	Nicolas Frantz (LUX)	(Alcyon–Dunlop)
	Second	Maurice De Waele (BEL)	(Labor–Dunlop)
	Third	Julien Vervaecke (BEL)	(Armor–Dunlop)

The 1927 Tour de France was the 21st edition of the Tour de France, taking place from 19 June to 17 July. It consisted of 24 stages over 5,398 km (3,354 mi).

This tour featured the first win by Nicolas Frantz, a cyclist from Luxembourg. Frantz had come in second in the previous tour, and went on to win the tour in 1928 as well. It also showcased the debuts of André Leducq (4th) and Antonin Magne (6th), two French riders who would win the Tour de France in coming years.

Because Tour director Henri Desgrange was dissatisfied with the tactics used in the long flat stages in the previous years, the individual team start format was introduced, similar to the later team time trial. In this concept, used in stages 1 to 9, 14 and 18 to 23, teams left fifteen minutes after each other. The concept did not make the race more interesting, so after the 1929 Tour de France, it was removed again.

== Innovations and changes ==
In 1926 and previous years, in the flat stages without mountains most cyclists finished together, and the winner was determined by a bunch sprint. The Tour organisation did not like this, because they wanted the cyclists to ride individually, and have a more spectacular race. For this reason, most of the flat stages in the 1927 Tour de France were started separately, with 15 minutes in between teams, and the touriste-routiers starting last. The idea was that the stars of the race could not see their rivals, and had no choice but to ride as fast as they could on every stage.

In 1926, as an experiment the Tour started outside Paris, in the Alps. In 1927, this decision was reverted, and the Tour started again in Paris. The route of the 1927 Tour de France was similar to other Tours before 1926 that started in Paris, only some stages had been split, making the average stage shorter, from 338 km per stage in 1926 to 221 km per stage in 1927.

== Race overview ==
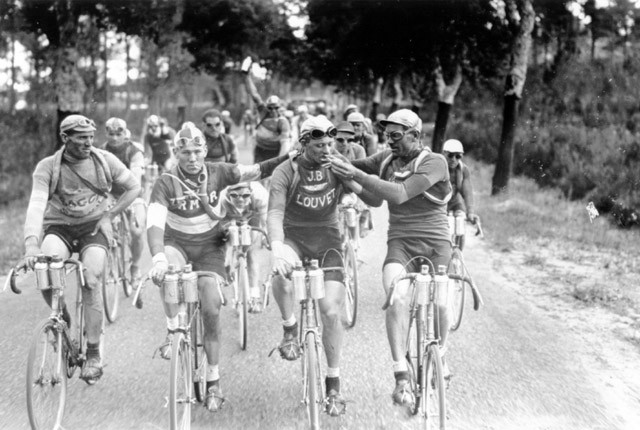
Julien Vervaecke and Maurice Geldhof smoking a cigarette during the race

In the first stage, the Alcyon-team suffered twenty punctures. The Dilecta-Wolber team won the first stage, led by Francis Pélissier, who was the first leader of the general classification.

In the sixth stage, Francis Pélissier abandoned sick. His teammate Ferdinand Le Drogo became the new leader. In the seventh stage, Le Drogo was in the yellow jersey in the region where he was born. His supporters cheered for him, and he got excited and sped away from his teammates. That costed him too much energy, and he lost 20 minutes in that stage to the J.B. Louvet team, so the lead was transferred to Hector Martin, from the J.B. Louvet team. In stage 8, the Dilecta team lost more than one hour, and they saw nothing left to win, and abandoned the race. At the end of stage 9, when the first group of team-time-trials stopped, there were only 57 cyclists left in the race, 35 of which were touriste-routiers, and only 22 had sponsors.

The first mountain stage was stage eleven. In that stage, touriste-routier Michele Gordini escaped secretly from the peloton. When the peloton found out he was away, he had already built a 45-minute advantage, and was the virtual leader of the race. Then he suffered from mechanical problems, and was passed before the end of the stage. Frantz won the stage, and took the yellow jersey.

In stages 12 and 13, Frantz finished in the leading group. Stage 14 was run in the team-time-trial format, and did not cause big changes in the general classification. Frantz then won the fifteenth stage and finished second in the sixteenth stage, and increased his lead to more than one hour. In the seventeenth stage, Frantz lost 15 minutes to second-placed Maurice De Waele, but because this was the last mountain stage, he had practically secured the victory.

The rest of the stages did not cause big changes in the general classification. The only exception was the 23rd stage, where De Waele lost more than half an hour, but his margin to the third-placed rider was large enough.

== Results ==
In stages 1 to 9 and 18 to 23, the cyclists started in teams, each 15 minutes apart; the touriste-routiers started last. The cyclist who reached the finish fastest was the winner of the stage. In stages 10 to 17, all cyclists started together. The time that each cyclist required to finish the stage was recorded. For the general classification, these times were added up; the cyclist with the least accumulated time was the race leader, identified by the yellow jersey.

=== Stage winners ===
Stage characteristics and winners
Stage	Date	Course	Distance	Type (Note: There was no distinction in the rules between plain stages and mountain stages. The flat stages, 1 to 9, 14 and 18 to 23, indicated by the clock icon, were run as team time trials. The other stages, indicated by the other icons, were run individually, and the mountain icon indicates that the stage included one or more mountains.)	Winner	Race leader
1	19 June	Paris to Dieppe	180 km (110 mi)	Team time trial	Francis Pélissier (FRA)	Francis Pélissier (FRA)
2	20 June	Dieppe to Le Havre	103 km (64 mi)	Team time trial	Maurice Dewaele (BEL)	Francis Pélissier (FRA)
3	21 June	Le Havre to Caen	225 km (140 mi)	Team time trial	Hector Martin (BEL)	Francis Pélissier (FRA)
4	22 June	Caen to Cherbourg-en-Cotentin	140 km (87 mi)	Team time trial	Camille van de Casteele (BEL)	Francis Pélissier (FRA)
5	23 June	Cherbourg to Dinan	199 km (124 mi)	Team time trial	Ferdinand Le Drogo (FRA)	Francis Pélissier (FRA)
6	24 June	Dinan to Brest	206 km (128 mi)	Team time trial	André Leducq (FRA)	Ferdinand Le Drogo (FRA)
7	25 June	Brest to Vannes	207 km (129 mi)	Team time trial	Gustaaf van Slembrouck (BEL)	Hector Martin (BEL)
8	26 June	Vannes to Les Sables d'Olonne	204 km (127 mi)	Team time trial	Raymond Decorte (BEL)	Hector Martin (BEL)
9	27 June	Les Sables d'Olonne to Bordeaux	285 km (177 mi)	Team time trial	Adelin Benoit (BEL)	Hector Martin (BEL)
10	28 June	Bordeaux to Bayonne	189 km (117 mi)	Plain stage	Pé Verhaegen (BEL)	Hector Martin (BEL)
11	30 June	Bayonne to Luchon	326 km (203 mi)	Stage with mountain(s)	Nicolas Frantz (LUX)	Nicolas Frantz (LUX)
12	2 July	Luchon to Perpignan	323 km (201 mi)	Stage with mountain(s)	Gustaaf van Slembrouck (BEL)	Nicolas Frantz (LUX)
13	4 July	Perpignan to Marseille	360 km (220 mi)	Plain stage	Maurice Dewaele (BEL)	Nicolas Frantz (LUX)
14	5 July	Marseille to Toulon	120 km (75 mi)	Team time trial	Antonin Magne (FRA)	Nicolas Frantz (LUX)
15	6 July	Toulon to Nice	220 km (140 mi)	Stage with mountain(s)	Nicolas Frantz (LUX)	Nicolas Frantz (LUX)
16	8 July	Nice to Briançon	275 km (171 mi)	Stage with mountain(s)	Julien Vervaecke (BEL)	Nicolas Frantz (LUX)
17	9 July	Briançon to Evian	283 km (176 mi)	Stage with mountain(s)	Pé Verhaegen (BEL)	Nicolas Frantz (LUX)
18	11 July	Evian to Pontarlier	213 km (132 mi)	Team time trial	Adelin Benoit (BEL)	Nicolas Frantz (LUX)
19	12 July	Pontarlier to Belfort	119 km (74 mi)	Team time trial	Maurice Geldhof (BEL)	Nicolas Frantz (LUX)
20	13 July	Belfort to Strasbourg	145 km (90 mi)	Team time trial	Raymond Decorte (BEL)	Nicolas Frantz (LUX)
21	14 July	Strasbourg to Metz	165 km (103 mi)	Team time trial	Nicolas Frantz (LUX)	Nicolas Frantz (LUX)
22	15 July	Metz to Charleville	159 km (99 mi)	Team time trial	Hector Martin (BEL)	Nicolas Frantz (LUX)
23	16 July	Charleville to Dunkerque	270 km (170 mi)	Team time trial	André Leducq (FRA)	Nicolas Frantz (LUX)
24	17 July	Dunkerque to Paris	344 km (214 mi)	Plain stage	André Leducq (FRA)	Nicolas Frantz (LUX)
	Total		5,398 km (3,354 mi)			

=== General classification ===
Final general classification (1–10)
Rank	Rider	Sponsor	Time
1	Nicolas Frantz (LUX)	Alcyon–Dunlop	198h 16' 42"
2	Maurice De Waele (BEL)	Labor–Dunlop	+ 1h 48' 21"
3	Julien Vervaecke (BEL)	Armor–Dunlop	+ 2h 25' 06"
4	André Leducq (FRA)	Thomann–Dunlop	+ 3h 02' 05"
5 (Note: On 20 July 1927 the judges published a correction in general classification.)	Antonin Magne (FRA)	Alleluia–Wolber	+ 4h 38' 23"
6	Adelin Benoit (BEL)	Alcyon–Dunlop	+ 4h 45' 01"
7	Pé Verhaegen (BEL)	J.B. Louvet	+ 6h 18' 36"
8	Julien Moineau (FRA)	Alleluia–Wolber	+ 6h 36' 17"
9	Hector Martin (BEL)	J.B. Louvet	+ 7h 07' 34"
10	Maurice Geldhof (BEL)	J.B. Louvet	+ 7h 16' 02"

Final general classification (11–39)
Rank	Rider	Sponsor	Time
11	Raymond Decorte (BEL)	J.B. Louvet	+ 8h 17' 12"
12	Louis Muller (BEL)	Armor–Dunlop	+ 8h 27' 49"
13	Jan Debusschere (BEL)	Alcyon–Dunlop	+ 10h 51' 56"
14	Gustaaf Van Slembrouck (BEL)	J.B. Louvet	+ 11h 01' 54"
15	Pierre Magne (FRA)	Alleluia–Wolber	+ 12h 12' 37"
16	Louis Delannoy (BEL)	Labor–Dunlop	+ 13h 28' 02"
17	Jos Hemelsoet (BEL)	J.B. Louvet	+ 14h 08' 18"
18	Secondo Martinetto (ITA)	Touriste-Routier	+ 14h 37' 12"
19	Henri Touzard (FRA)	Touriste-Routier	+ 15h 08' 03"
20	José Pelletier (FRA)	Touriste-Routier	+ 15h 52' 28"
21	Maurice Arnoult (FRA)	Touriste-Routier	+ 16h 05' 01"
22	Charles Martinet (SUI)	Touriste-Routier	+ 16h 53' 36"
23	Albert Jordens (BEL)	Touriste-Routier	+ 17h 18' 48"
24	Michele Gordini (ITA)	Touriste-Routier	+ 17h 21' 11"
25	Giovanni Canova (ITA)	Touriste-Routier	+ 17h 52' 52"
26	André Devauchelle (FRA)	Alleluia–Wolber	+ 18h 02' 10"
27	Charles Krier (LUX)	Touriste-Routier	+ 20h 42' 32"
28	Léon Despontin (BEL)	Touriste-Routier	+ 21h 15' 02"
29	Giuseppe Rivella (ITA)	Touriste-Routier	+ 22h 14' 26"
30	Marcel Gendrin (FRA)	Touriste-Routier	+ 22h 20' 35"
31	Omer Mahy (BEL)	Touriste-Routier	+ 22h 27' 49"
32	Giovanni Rossignoli (ITA)	Touriste-Routier	+ 22h 31' 18"
33	Camille Segers (BEL)	Touriste-Routier	+ 22h 52' 35"
34	Edoaurd Teisseire (FRA)	Touriste-Routier	+ 23h 59' 59"
35	Jules Nempon (FRA)	Touriste-Routier	+ 25h 39' 05"
36	Amand Goubert (FRA)	Touriste-Routier	+ 27h 04' 27"
37	André Drobecq (FRA)	Touriste-Routier	+ 27h 10' 20"
38	Pierre Claes (BEL)	Touriste-Routier	+ 29h 12' 19"
39	Jacques Pfister (FRA)	Touriste-Routier	+ 30h 03' 51"

== Notes ==
=== Other classifications ===
The organing newspaper, l'Auto named a meilleur grimpeur (best climber), an unofficial precursor to the modern King of the Mountains competition. This award was won by Michele Gordini.

== Aftermath ==
The experiment with the team-time-trial-like stages was not considered successful; the change did not have the effect that cyclists were riding more individually, but the stronger teams became even stronger. For the 1928 Tour de France, the system was used again, but in 1929 it was reduced to a few stages, and it disappeared completely in the 1930 Tour de France.

The French cyclists had not been successful in the last Tours de France; they had their last overall victory in 1923, and 1926 did not even see a French stage victory. In 1927, the French cyclists had 5 stage victories, and two cyclists in the top ten: André Leducq and Antonin Magne. Leducq would later win the Tour de France in 1930 and 1932, while Magne would win the Tour de France in 1931 and 1934.

== Bibliography ==
- Augendre, Jacques (2016). Guide historique [Historical guide] (PDF) (in French). Paris: Amaury Sport Organisation. Archived (PDF) from the original on 17 August 2016.
- McGann, Bill; McGann, Carol (2006). The Story of the Tour de France: 1903–1964. Vol. 1. Indianapolis, IN: Dog Ear Publishing. ISBN 978-1-59858-180-5.
