= 1929 Tour de France, Stage 1 to Stage 11 =

Cycling race stages

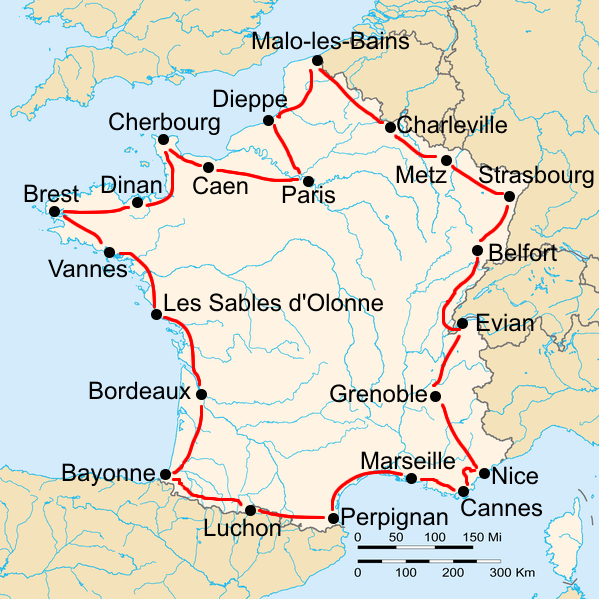
Route of the 1929 Tour de France

The 1929 Tour de France was the 23rd edition of Tour de France, one of cycling's Grand Tours. The Tour began in Paris with a flat stage on 30 June, and Stage 11 occurred on 13 July with a flat stage to Marseille. The race finished in Paris on 28 July.

== Stage 1 ==
30 June 1929 — Paris to Caen, 206 km (128 mi)

Stage 1 result and general classification after stage 1

Rank	Rider	Time
1	Aimé Dossche (BEL)	5h 55' 21"
2	Aimé Deolet (BEL)	s.t.
3	Marcel Bidot (FRA)	s.t.
4	Maurice De Waele (BEL)	s.t.
5	André Leducq (FRA)	+ 47"
6	Raymond Decorte (BEL)	s.t.
7	André Godinat (FRA)	s.t.
8	Nicolas Frantz (LUX)	s.t.
9	Michele Mara (ITA)	s.t.
10	Henri Simonin (FRA)	s.t.

== Stage 2 ==
1 July 1929 — Caen to Cherbourg-en-Cotentin, 140 km (87 mi)

Stage 2 result

Rank	Rider	Time
1	André Leducq (FRA)	4h 20' 51"
2	Aimé Dossche (BEL)	s.t.
3	Charles Pélissier (FRA)	s.t.
4	Hector Martin (BEL)	s.t.
5	Aimé Deolet (BEL)	s.t.
=6	Frans Bonduel (BEL)	s.t.
=6	Julien Vervaecke (BEL)	s.t.
=6	Pé Verhaegen (BEL)	s.t.
=6	Francis Bouillet (FRA)	s.t.
=6	Gustaaf Van Slembrouck (BEL)	s.t.

General classification after stage 2

Rank	Rider	Time
=1	Aimé Dossche (BEL)	
=1	Aimé Deolet (BEL)	s.t.
=1	Marcel Bidot (FRA)	s.t.
=1	Maurice De Waele (BEL)	s.t.
5		
6		
7		
8		
9		
10		

== Stage 3 ==
2 July 1929 — Cherbourg-en-Cotentin to Dinan, 199 km (124 mi)

Stage 3 result

Rank	Rider	Time
1	Omer Taverne (BEL)	6h 21' 03"
2	Charles Pélissier (FRA)	s.t.
3	Jef Demuysere (BEL)	s.t.
4	André Godinat (FRA)	s.t.
=5	Armand Van Bruaene (BEL)	s.t.
=5	Luc Govaerts (BEL)	s.t.
=5	Julien Perrain (FRA)	s.t.
=5	Georges Berton (FRA)	s.t.
=5	Jean Aerts (BEL)	s.t.
=5	Lucien Buysse (BEL)	s.t.

General classification after stage 3

Rank	Rider	Time
=1	Aimé Dossche (BEL)	
=1	Aimé Deolet (BEL)	s.t.
=1	Marcel Bidot (FRA)	s.t.
=1	Maurice De Waele (BEL)	s.t.
5		
6		
7		
8		
9		
10		

== Stage 4 ==
3 July 1929 — Dinan to Brest, 206 km (128 mi)

Stage 4 result

Rank	Rider	Time
1	Louis De Lannoy (BEL)	6h 41' 54"
2	Maurice De Waele (BEL)	s.t.
3	Nicolas Frantz (LUX)	+ 3' 08"
4	Charles Pélissier (FRA)	s.t.
5	Aimé Deolet (BEL)	s.t.
6	Raymond Decorte (BEL)	s.t.
7	Omer Taverne (BEL)	s.t.
8	Jef Demuysere (BEL)	s.t.
=9	Aimé Dossche (BEL)	s.t.
=9	Léon Chene (FRA)	s.t.

General classification after stage 4

Rank	Rider	Time
1	Maurice De Waele (BEL)	
2	Louis De Lannoy (BEL)	+ 47"
3	Aimé Dossche (BEL)	+ 3' 08"
4		
5		
6		
7		
8		
9		
10		

== Stage 5 ==
4 July 1929 — Brest to Vannes, 208 km (129 mi)

Stage 5 result

Rank	Rider	Time
1	Gustaaf Van Slembrouck (BEL)	6h 29' 03"
2	Alfonso Crippa (ITA)	s.t.
3	Jean Aerts (BEL)	s.t.
4	Aimé Dossche (BEL)	s.t.
5	Albert Barthélémy (FRA)	s.t.
=6	Nicolas Frantz (LUX)	s.t.
=6	Antonin Magne (FRA)	s.t.
=6	Victor Fontan (FRA)	s.t.
=6	Ferdinand Le Drogo (FRA)	s.t.
=6	Jef Demuysere (BEL)	s.t.

General classification after stage 5

Rank	Rider	Time
1	Maurice De Waele (BEL)	
=2	Aimé Dossche (BEL)	+ 3' 08"
=2	Marcel Bidot (FRA)	s.t.
=2	Aimé Deolet (BEL)	s.t.
5		
6		
7		
8		
9		
10		

== Stage 6 ==
5 July 1929 — Vannes to Les Sables d'Olonne, 204 km (127 mi)

Stage 6 result

Rank	Rider	Time
1	Paul Le Drogo (FRA)	6h 23' 14"
2	Jules Merviel (FRA)	s.t.
3	André Leducq (FRA)	s.t.
4	Hector Martin (BEL)	s.t.
5	Nicolas Frantz (LUX)	s.t.
6	Charles Pélissier (FRA)	s.t.
7	Jean Aerts (BEL)	s.t.
=8	Marcel Bidot (FRA)	s.t.
=8	Victor Fontan (FRA)	s.t.
=8	Francis Bouillet (FRA)	s.t.

General classification after stage 6

Rank	Rider	Time
1	Maurice De Waele (BEL)	
=2	Aimé Dossche (BEL)	+ 3' 08"
=2	Marcel Bidot (FRA)	s.t.
=2	Aimé Deolet (BEL)	s.t.
5		
6		
7		
8		
9		
10		

== Stage 7 ==
6 July 1929 — Les Sables d'Olonne to Bordeaux, 285 km (177 mi)

Stage 7 result

Rank	Rider	Time
1	Nicolas Frantz (LUX)	9h 13' 07"
2	Antonin Magne (FRA)	s.t.
3	Jef Demuysere (BEL)	s.t.
4	Victor Fontan (FRA)	s.t.
5	André Leducq (FRA)	s.t.
6	Charles Pélissier (FRA)	+ 43"
7	Jules Merviel (FRA)	+ 55"
8	André Godinat (FRA)	s.t.
9	Louis De Lannoy (BEL)	s.t.
10	Salvador Cardona Balbastre (ESP)	s.t.

General classification after stage 7

Rank	Rider	Time
=1	Nicolas Frantz (LUX)	
=1	André Leducq (FRA)	s.t.
=1	Victor Fontan (FRA)	s.t.
4		
5		
6		
7		
8		
9		
10		

== Stage 8 ==
7 July 1929 — Bordeaux to Bayonne, 182 km (113 mi)

Stage 8 result

Rank	Rider	Time
1	Julien Moineau (FRA)	5h 36' 25"
2	Gustaaf Van Slembrouck (BEL)	s.t.
3	Gaston Rebry (BEL)	s.t.
4	Nicolas Frantz (LUX)	+ 3' 21"
5	Charles Pélissier (FRA)	s.t.
6	Francis Bouillet (FRA)	s.t.
7	Jean Aerts (BEL)	s.t.
=8	Marcel Bidot (FRA)	s.t.
=8	André Godinat (FRA)	s.t.
=8	August Verdyck (BEL)	s.t.

General classification after stage 8

Rank	Rider	Time
1	Gaston Rebry (BEL)	
=2	Nicolas Frantz (LUX)	+ 2' 26"
=2	André Leducq (FRA)	s.t.
=2	Victor Fontan (FRA)	s.t.
5		
6		
7		
8		
9		
10		

== Stage 9 ==
9 July 1929 — Bayonne to Luchon, 363 km (226 mi)

Stage 9 result

Rank	Rider	Time
1	Salvador Cardona Balbastre (ESP)	16h 31' 57"
2	Victor Fontan (FRA)	s.t.
3	Maurice De Waele (BEL)	+ 8' 06"
4	Nicolas Frantz (LUX)	+ 11' 04"
5	Romain Bellenger (FRA)	s.t.
6	Giuseppe Pancera (ITA)	s.t.
7	Jef Demuysere (BEL)	+ 16' 23"
8	Antonin Magne (FRA)	s.t.
9	Settimo Innocenti (ITA)	s.t.
10	Benoît Faure (FRA)	s.t.

General classification after stage 9

Rank	Rider	Time
1	Victor Fontan (FRA)	
2	Maurice De Waele (BEL)	+ 9' 54"
3	Nicolas Frantz (LUX)	+ 11' 04"
4		
5		
6		
7		
8		
9		
10		

== Stage 10 ==
10 July 1929 — Luchon to Perpignan, 323 km (201 mi)

Stage 10 result

Rank	Rider	Time
1	Jef Demuysere (BEL)	11h 42' 48"
2	Louis De Lannoy (BEL)	s.t.
3	Maurice De Waele (BEL)	+ 9"
4	Benoît Faure (FRA)	+ 5' 29"
5	André Leducq (FRA)	+ 11' 47"
6	Frans Bonduel (BEL)	s.t.
7	Giuseppe Pancera (ITA)	+ 16' 23"
8	Francis Bouillet (FRA)	+ 13' 13"
9	Bernard Van Rysselberghe (BEL)	+ 25' 25"
10	Salvador Cardona Balbastre (ESP)	s.t.

General classification after stage 10

Rank	Rider	Time
1	Maurice De Waele (BEL)	
2	Jef Demuysere (BEL)	+ 14' 49"
3	Giuseppe Pancera (ITA)	+ 22' 01"
4		
5		
6		
7		
8		
9		
10		

== Stage 11 ==
13 July 1929 — Perpignan to Marseille, 366 km (227 mi)

Stage 11 result

Rank	Rider	Time
1	André Leducq (FRA)	13h 37' 29"
2	Nicolas Frantz (LUX)	s.t.
3	Charles Pélissier (FRA)	s.t.
4	Julien Delbecque (BEL)	s.t.
5	Hector Martin (BEL)	s.t.
6	Antonin Magne (FRA)	s.t.
7	Omer Taverne (BEL)	s.t.
8	Luc Govaerts (BEL)	s.t.
=9	Jef Demuysere (BEL)	s.t.
=9	Giuseppe Pancera (ITA)	s.t.

General classification after stage 11

Rank	Rider	Time
1	Maurice De Waele (BEL)	
2	Jef Demuysere (BEL)	+ 14' 49"
3	Giuseppe Pancera (ITA)	+ 22' 01"
4		
5		
6		
7		
8		
9		
10		
