= 1929 Tour de France, Stage 12 to Stage 22 =

Cycling race stages

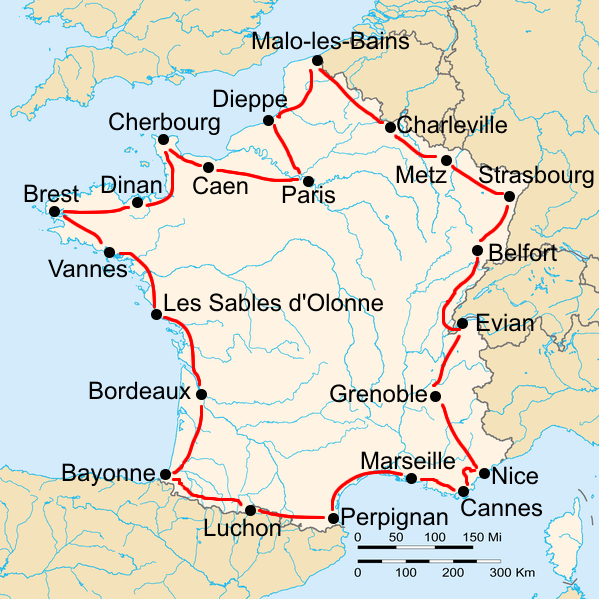
Route of the 1929 Tour de France

The 1929 Tour de France was the 23rd edition of Tour de France, one of cycling's Grand Tours. The Tour began in Paris with a flat stage on 30 June, and Stage 12 occurred on 13 July with a team time trial from Marseille. The race finished in Paris on 28 July.

== Stage 12 ==
15 July 1929 — Marseille to Cannes, 191 km (119 mi) (TTT)

Stage 12 result

Rank	Rider	Time
1	Marcel Bidot (FRA)	5h 57' 45"
2	Nicolas Frantz (LUX)	+ 2' 36"
3	Frans Bonduel (BEL)	s.t.
4	Hector Martin (BEL)	s.t.
5	Antonin Magne (FRA)	s.t.
6	Gaston Rebry (BEL)	s.t.
7	Jef Demuysere (BEL)	s.t.
=8	Louis De Lannoy (BEL)	s.t.
=8	Salvador Cardona Balbastre (ESP)	s.t.
=8	Pierre Magne (FRA)	s.t.

General classification after stage 12

Rank	Rider	Time
1	Maurice De Waele (BEL)	
2	Jef Demuysere (BEL)	+ 13' 08"
3	Louis De Lannoy (BEL)	+ 23' 05"
4		
5		
6		
7		
8		
9		
10		

== Stage 13 ==
16 July 1929 — Cannes to Nice, 133 km (83 mi)

Stage 13 result

Rank	Rider	Time
1	Benoît Faure (FRA)	4h 52' 18"
2	Julien Moineau (FRA)	+ 38"
3	André Leducq (FRA)	+ 3' 52"
4	Pierre Magne (FRA)	+ 4' 43"
5	Giuseppe Pancera (ITA)	s.t.
6	Mario Pomposi (ITA)	s.t.
7	Maurice De Waele (BEL)	+ 7' 39"
8	Julien Vervaecke (BEL)	+ 9' 05"
9	Marcel Bidot (FRA)	+ 10' 50"
10	Louis De Lannoy (BEL)	s.t.

General classification after stage 13

Rank	Rider	Time
1	Maurice De Waele (BEL)	
2	Giuseppe Pancera (ITA)	+ 21' 22"
3	Jef Demuysere (BEL)	+ 25' 02"
4		
5		
6		
7		
8		
9		
10		

== Stage 14 ==
18 July 1929 — Nice to Grenoble, 333 km (207 mi)

Stage 14 result

Rank	Rider	Time
1	Gaston Rebry (BEL)	13h 19' 06"
2	Jef Demuysere (BEL)	s.t.
3	Giuseppe Pancera (ITA)	+ 6' 42"
4	Maurice De Waele (BEL)	s.t.
5	Bernard Van Rysselberghe (BEL)	+ 11' 51"
6	Benoît Faure (FRA)	s.t.
7	Salvador Cardona Balbastre (ESP)	s.t.
8	Frans Bonduel (BEL)	s.t.
9	Charles Pélissier (FRA)	+ 13' 55"
10	André Leducq (FRA)	+ 14' 59"

General classification after stage 14

Rank	Rider	Time
1	Maurice De Waele (BEL)	
2	Jef Demuysere (BEL)	+ 18' 20"
3	Giuseppe Pancera (ITA)	+ 21' 22"
4		
5		
6		
7		
8		
9		
10		

== Stage 15 ==
20 July 1929 — Grenoble to Evian, 329 km (204 mi)

Stage 15 result

Rank	Rider	Time
1	Julien Vervaecke (BEL)	13h 09' 37"
2	Nicolas Frantz (LUX)	s.t.
3	Pierre Magne (FRA)	+ 4' 45"
4	Antonin Magne (FRA)	+ 7' 34"
5	Désiré Louesse (BEL)	s.t.
6	Giuseppe Pancera (ITA)	s.t.
7	Julien Moineau (FRA)	+ 10' 23"
8	Salvador Cardona Balbastre (ESP)	s.t.
9	Benoît Faure (FRA)	s.t.
10	Gaston Rebry (BEL)	+ 13' 25"

General classification after stage 15

Rank	Rider	Time
1	Maurice De Waele (BEL)	
2	Giuseppe Pancera (ITA)	+ 15' 31"
3	Jef Demuysere (BEL)	+ 18' 20"
4		
5		
6		
7		
8		
9		
10		

== Stage 16 ==
22 July 1929 — Evian to Belfort, 283 km (176 mi)

Stage 16 result

Rank	Rider	Time
1	Charles Pélissier (FRA)	9h 34' 05"
2	André Leducq (FRA)	+ 24' 31"
3	Bernard Van Rysselberghe (BEL)	s.t.
4	Antonin Magne (FRA)	s.t.
5	Frans Bonduel (BEL)	s.t.
6	Armand Van Bruaene (BEL)	s.t.
=7	Benoît Faure (FRA)	s.t.
=7	Nicolas Frantz (LUX)	s.t.
=7	Jef Demuysere (BEL)	s.t.
=7	Giuseppe Pancera (ITA)	s.t.

General classification after stage 16

Rank	Rider	Time
1	Maurice De Waele (BEL)	
2	Giuseppe Pancera (ITA)	+ 15' 31"
3	Jef Demuysere (BEL)	+ 18' 20"
4		
5		
6		
7		
8		
9		
10		

== Stage 17 ==
23 July 1929 — Belfort to Strasbourg, 145 km (90 mi)

Stage 17 result

Rank	Rider	Time
1	André Leducq (FRA)	4h 27' 24"
2	Frans Bonduel (BEL)	s.t.
3	Bernard Van Rysselberghe (BEL)	s.t.
4	Antonin Magne (FRA)	s.t.
5	Pierre Magne (FRA)	s.t.
6	Nicolas Frantz (LUX)	s.t.
7	Louis De Lannoy (BEL)	s.t.
8	Francis Bouillet (FRA)	s.t.
9	Georges Laloup (BEL)	s.t.
10	Salvador Cardona Balbastre (ESP)	s.t.

General classification after stage 17

Rank	Rider	Time
1	Maurice De Waele (BEL)	
2	Giuseppe Pancera (ITA)	+ 15' 31"
3	Jef Demuysere (BEL)	+ 18' 20"
4		
5		
6		
7		
8		
9		
10		

== Stage 18 ==
24 July 1929 — Strasbourg to Metz, 165 km (103 mi)

Stage 18 result

Rank	Rider	Time
1	André Leducq (FRA)	5h 47' 10"
2	Charles Pélissier (FRA)	s.t.
3	Nicolas Frantz (LUX)	s.t.
4	Armand Van Bruaene (BEL)	s.t.
5	Antonin Magne (FRA)	s.t.
6	Gaston Rebry (BEL)	s.t.
7	Bernard Van Rysselberghe (BEL)	s.t.
=8	Jef Demuysere (BEL)	s.t.
=8	Marcel Bidot (FRA)	s.t.
=8	Omer Taverne (BEL)	s.t.

General classification after stage 18

Rank	Rider	Time
1	Maurice De Waele (BEL)	
2	Jef Demuysere (BEL)	+ 18' 20"
3	Giuseppe Pancera (ITA)	+ 20' 09"
4		
5		
6		
7		
8		
9		
10		

== Stage 19 ==
25 July 1929 — Metz to Charleville, 159 km (99 mi) (TTT)

Stage 19 result

Rank	Rider	Time
1	Bernard Van Rysselberghe (BEL)	4h 44' 06"
2	Antonin Magne (FRA)	s.t.
3	Frans Bonduel (BEL)	s.t.
4	Armand Van Bruaene (BEL)	s.t.
5	Gaston Rebry (BEL)	s.t.
6	Désiré Louesse (BEL)	s.t.
7	Louis De Lannoy (BEL)	s.t.
8	Pierre Magne (FRA)	s.t.
=9	Jef Demuysere (BEL)	s.t.
=9	Marcel Bidot (FRA)	s.t.

General classification after stage 19

Rank	Rider	Time
1	Maurice De Waele (BEL)	
2	Jef Demuysere (BEL)	+ 18' 20"
3	Giuseppe Pancera (ITA)	+ 24' 02"
4		
5		
6		
7		
8		
9		
10		

== Stage 20 ==
26 July 1929 — Charleville to Malo-les-Bains, 270 km (170 mi) (TTT)

Stage 20 result

Rank	Rider	Time
1	Maurice De Waele (BEL)	9h 16' 16"
2	Julien Vervaecke (BEL)	s.t.
3	Gaston Rebry (BEL)	s.t.
4	Nicolas Frantz (LUX)	+ 10"
5	Antonin Magne (FRA)	s.t.
6	Louis De Lannoy (BEL)	s.t.
7	Jef Demuysere (BEL)	s.t.
8	Salvador Cardona Balbastre (ESP)	s.t.
9	Giuseppe Pancera (ITA)	s.t.
10	Julien Perrain (FRA)	s.t.

General classification after stage 20

Rank	Rider	Time
1	Maurice De Waele (BEL)	
2	Jef Demuysere (BEL)	+ 28' 20"
3	Giuseppe Pancera (ITA)	+ 34' 02"
4		
5		
6		
7		
8		
9		
10		

== Stage 21 ==
27 July 1929 — Malo-les-Bains to Dieppe, 234 km (145 mi)

Stage 21 result

Rank	Rider	Time
1	André Leducq (FRA)	9h 03' 52"
2	Charles Pélissier (FRA)	s.t.
3	Jef Demuysere (BEL)	s.t.
4	Jules Merviel (FRA)	s.t.
5	Louis De Lannoy (BEL)	s.t.
6	Antonin Magne (FRA)	s.t.
7	Nicolas Frantz (LUX)	s.t.
=8	Roger Gregoire (FRA)	s.t.
=8	Giuseppe Pancera (ITA)	s.t.
=8	Marcel Bidot (FRA)	s.t.

General classification after stage 21

Rank	Rider	Time
1	Maurice De Waele (BEL)	
2	Jef Demuysere (BEL)	+ 28' 20"
3	Giuseppe Pancera (ITA)	+ 34' 02"
4		
5		
6		
7		
8		
9		
10		

== Stage 22 ==
28 July 1929 — Dieppe to Paris, 332 km (206 mi)

Stage 22 result

Rank	Rider	Time
1	Nicolas Frantz (LUX)	12h 19' 19"
2	Charles Pélissier (FRA)	s.t.
3	Jules Merviel (FRA)	s.t.
4	Frans Bonduel (BEL)	s.t.
5	Benoît Faure (FRA)	s.t.
=6	Salvador Cardona Balbastre (ESP)	s.t.
=6	Jef Demuysere (BEL)	s.t.
=6	Gaston Rebry (BEL)	s.t.
=6	Marcel Bidot (FRA)	s.t.
=6	Antonin Magne (FRA)	s.t.

General classification after stage 22

Rank	Rider	Time
1	Maurice De Waele (BEL)	186h 39' 16"
2	Giuseppe Pancera (ITA)	+ 44' 23"
3	Jef Demuysere (BEL)	+ 57' 10"
4	Salvador Cardona Balbastre (ESP)	+ 57' 46"
5	Nicolas Frantz (LUX)	+ 58' 00"
6	Louis De Lannoy (BEL)	+ 1h 06' 09"
7	Antonin Magne (FRA)	+ 1h 08' 00"
8	Julien Vervaecke (BEL)	+ 2h 01' 37"
9	Pierre Magne (FRA)	+ 2h 03' 00"
10	Gaston Rebry (BEL)	+ 2h 17' 49"
