= Aimé Dossche =

Belgian cyclist (1902–1985)

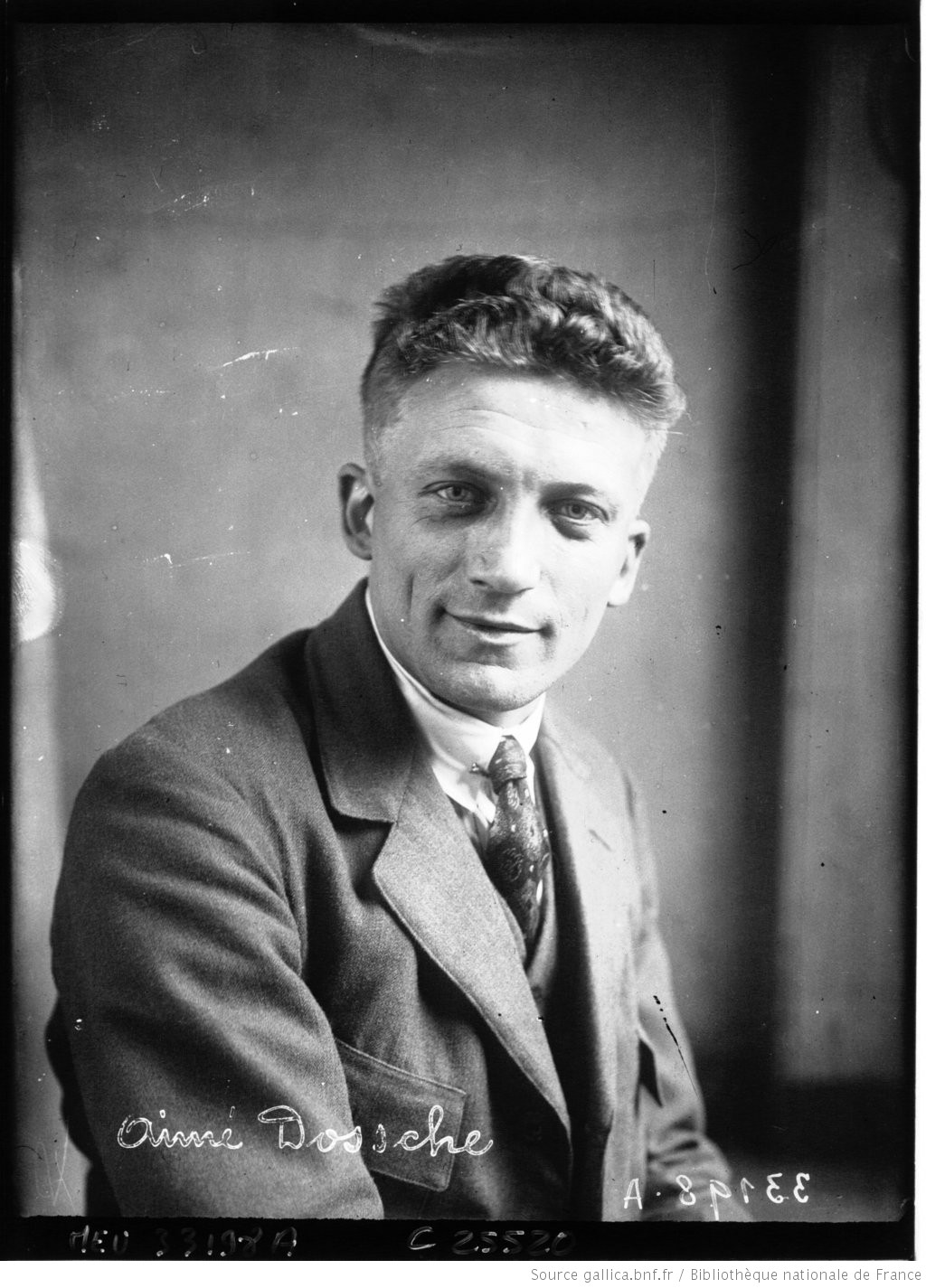

Personal information
- Full name: Aimé Dossche
- Born: 28 March 1902 Landegem, Belgium
- Died: 30 October 1985 (aged 83) Ghent, Belgium

Cycling career
- Sport: Cycling
- Discipline: Road
- Role: Rider

Major wins
- Grand Tours Tour de France 3 individual stages (1936, 1938) One-day races and Classics Championship of Flanders (1925, 1928, 1931)

Aimé Dossche (28 March 1902 – 30 October 1985) was a Belgian racing cyclist who won two stages in the 1926 Tour de France and one stage in the 1929 Tour de France, and as a result wore the yellow jersey for three days., although some sources indicate that two of those days he joined the lead with Aime Déolet, Marcel Bidot and Maurice Dewaele. Dossche was born in Landegem and died in Ghent.

== Major results ==
1922
1st Kampioenschap van Vlaanderen Independents
3rd Overall Tour of Belgium Independents

1st Stage 4

1924
1st Paris-Cambrai
2nd Paris-Nantes
3rd Binche–Chimay–Binche
3rd Bruxelles-Bellaire
1925
1st Kampioenschap van Vlaanderen
3rd Paris-Nantes
7th Tour of Flanders
7th Overall Tour of the Basque Country
9th Paris-Tours
1926
Tour de France

Winner Stages 2 and 17

4th Paris-Brussels
7th Overall Tour of Belgium
9th Giro di Lombardia
1927
1st Mere
2nd Paris-Menin
8th Overall Tour of the Basque Country
1928
1st Kampioenschap van Vlaanderen
1st Circuit de Champagne
1st Erembodegem-Terjoden
2nd Grote 1-MeiPrijs
2nd Brussels-Paris
1929
1st Paris-Cambrai
1st Landegem
Tour de France:

1st Stage 1
Wearing for three days

2nd Kampioenschap van Vlaanderen
5th Paris-Tours
6th Paris–Roubaix
1930
1st Oudenaarde
1st Zelzate
2nd Tour of Flanders
3rd Paris-Lille
6th Paris–Roubaix
7th Paris-Tours
1931
1st Kampioenschap van Vlaanderen
1st Ghent
