= 1929 Tour de France =

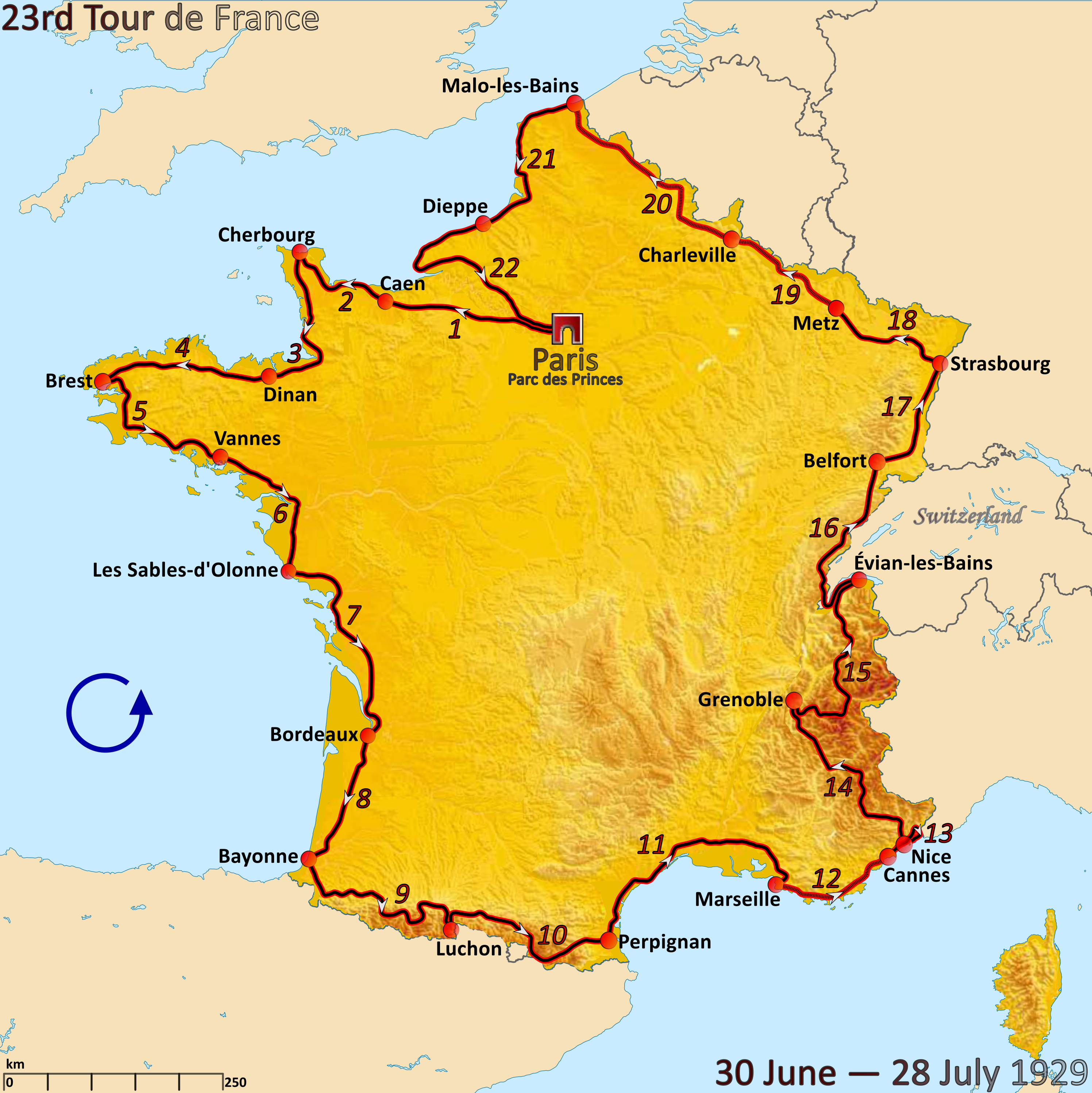
- Route of the 1929 Tour de France followed counterclockwise, starting in Paris

Race details
- Dates: 30 June – 28 July 1929
- Stages: 22
- Distance: 5,286 km (3,285 mi)
- Winning time: 186h 39' 16"

Results
Jersey awarded to the overall winner	Winner	Maurice De Waele (BEL)	(Alcyon)
	Second	Giuseppe Pancera (ITA)	(La Rafale)
	Third	Jef Demuysere (BEL)	(Lucifer)

The 1929 Tour de France was the 23rd edition of the Tour de France, taking place from 30 June to 28 July. It consisted of 22 stages over 5,286 km (3,285 mi).

Nicolas Frantz had won two consecutive Tours, in 1927 and 1928, and was looking for a third. In addition the 1926 Tour winner, Lucien Buysse, was looking for another title.

Victor Fontan, leader of the general classification and therefore wearer of the yellow jersey, crashed in the Pyrenees during stage 10, breaking the forks to his bicycle. At that time, a rule stated that a rider must finish a stage with the bike he started it with. Fontan went house to house, looking for a bike to borrow. He eventually found one and rode 145 km to the finish line, with his broken bike strapped to his back. At the end of the day Fontan quit the race in tears. The rule was removed for the 1930 Tour de France.

The Tour was won by Belgian Maurice De Waele, although he was sick during the race. The Tour organisation was not content with the outcome of the race, because the strongest team Alycon had been able to deliver the winner even though he was sick, so they changed the rules after the 1929 Tour de France, and for the next years there were no sponsored teams but only national or regional teams.

== Innovations and changes ==
In 1928, many stages were in the team-time-trial format, where the teams started separately. The Tour organisation had invented this rule to make the flat stages more competitive, but it had the effect that the public stopped following the race. Therefore, in 1929 the most stages were run in the normal format, except for stages 12, 19 and 20, the stages that were expected to be raced slower than 30 km/h.>

The entire podium in 1928 was occupied by members from the Alcyon cycling team. The tour organisation wanted the Tour to be an individual race, so in 1929 the teams were officially not there, and riders started in the A-category (professional cyclists) or as touriste-routiers (semi-professional or amateur).

In 1928, cyclist could be helped when they had a flat tire; in 1929 this rule was reversed, and cyclists had to fix their flat tires by themselves.

== Race overview ==
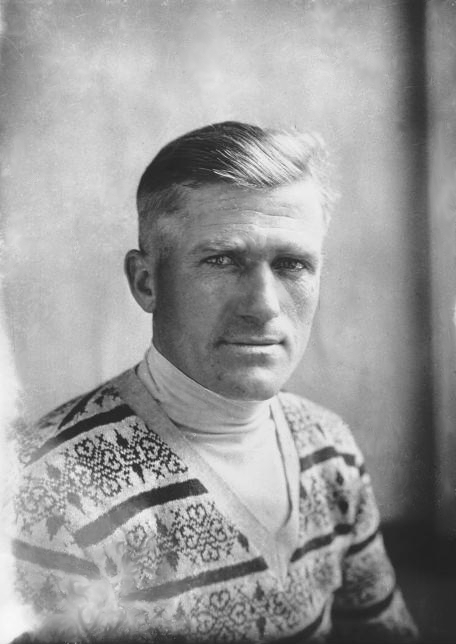
Maurice De Waele, winner of the 1929 Tour de France

In the first stages, the cyclists remained close to each other. Aimé Dossche won the first stage, and kept the lead for the next two stages. In the fourth stage, Maurice De Waele and Louis De Lannoy escaped from the bunch. De Lannoy won the stage, while Dewaele took over the lead in the general classification.

In the seventh stage, De Waele had two flat tires, and was not in the first group. Three man from that first group now shared the lead. There was no rule for this situation, so all three cyclists were given the yellow jersey in the next stage. In stage eight, this situation was solved, as Gaston Rebry took over the lead.

In the ninth stage, the first mountain stage, Lucien Buysse, the winner of the 1926 Tour de France and now racing as a touriste-routier, took the lead early in the race, and mounted the Aubisque first. In the descent, De Waele and Victor Fontan caught him. De Waele then punctured and lost eight minutes. Fontan was caught by the Spaniard Salvador Cardona, but his second place in the stage gave him the lead in the general classification. In the tenth stage, after only seven kilometers Fontan broke his fork. Some sources say he hit a dog, others say he fell in a gutter. He is said to have knocked on every door of a small town before he found a replacement bicycle. According to the rules, he had to finish the race with the bicycle he started with, so he strapped the broken bicycle to his back, and rode for 145 through the Pyrenees with a broken bicycle on his back, before he finally gave up.

After that tenth stage, Maurice De Waele was leading the general classification. One hour before the start of the fifteenth stage, he collapsed. The Alcyon team asked for the stage to be started one hour later, which was granted. De Waele was literally dragged on his bicycle, and his teammates rode shoulder-to-shoulder to prevent opponents from attacking. At the end of the stage, his teammates had helped him so much that he had lost only 13 minutes to the winner, finishing in 11th place. In the sixteenth stage, De Waele became better, and only Charles Pélissier could win time on him.

After the race was over, Jef Demuysere received 25 minutes penalty time in the general classification because he had taken drinks where this was not allowed. This moved him from the second place in the general classification to the third place.

== Results ==
In stages 12, 19 and 20, the cyclists started in teams. The cyclist who reached the finish fastest was the winner of the stage. In the other stages all cyclists started together. The time that each cyclist required to finish the stage was recorded. For the general classification, these times were added up; the cyclist with the least accumulated time was the race leader, identified by the yellow jersey.

=== Stage results ===
Stage characteristics and winners
Stage	Date	Course	Distance	Type (Note: The stages 12, 19 and 20, indicated by the clock icon, were run as team time trials. The other stages, indicated by the other icons, were run individually, and the icons indicate whether the stage included mountains.)	Winner	Race leader
1	30 June	Paris to Caen	206 km (128 mi)	Plain stage	Aimé Dossche (BEL)	Aimé Dossche (BEL)
2	1 July	Caen to Cherbourg-en-Cotentin	140 km (87 mi)	Plain stage	André Leducq (FRA)	Aimé Dossche (BEL)
3	2 July	Cherbourg to Dinan	199 km (124 mi)	Plain stage	Omer Taverne (BEL)	Aimé Dossche (BEL)
4	3 July	Dinan to Brest	206 km (128 mi)	Plain stage	Louis Delannoy (BEL)	Maurice Dewaele (BEL)
5	4 July	Brest to Vannes	208 km (129 mi)	Plain stage	Gustaaf van Slembrouck (BEL)	Maurice Dewaele (BEL)
6	5 July	Vannes to Les Sables d'Olonne	206 km (128 mi)	Plain stage	Paul Le Drogo (FRA)	Maurice Dewaele (BEL)
7	6 July	Les Sables d'Olonne to Bordeaux	285 km (177 mi)	Plain stage	Nicolas Frantz (LUX)	Nicolas Frantz (LUX); André Leducq (FRA); Victor Fontan (FRA) (Note: After the seventh stage, Frantz, Leducq and Fontan led the general classification with exactly the same time. There was no rule in this situation to determine who was the leader, so all three were considered leaders.)
8	7 July	Bordeaux to Bayonne	182 km (113 mi)	Plain stage	Julien Moineau (FRA)	Gaston Rebry (BEL)
9	9 July	Bayonne to Luchon	363 km (226 mi)	Stage with mountain(s)	Salvador Cardona (ESP)	Victor Fontan (FRA)
10	11 July	Luchon to Perpignan	323 km (201 mi)	Stage with mountain(s)	Jef Demuysere (BEL)	Maurice Dewaele (BEL)
11	13 July	Perpignan to Marseille	366 km (227 mi)	Plain stage	André Leducq (FRA)	Maurice Dewaele (BEL)
12	15 July	Marseille to Cannes	191 km (119 mi)	Team time trial	Marcel Bidot (FRA)	Maurice Dewaele (BEL)
13	16 July	Cannes to Nice	133 km (83 mi)	Stage with mountain(s)	Benoît Fauré (FRA)	Maurice Dewaele (BEL)
14	18 July	Nice to Grenoble	333 km (207 mi)	Stage with mountain(s)	Gaston Rebry (BEL)	Maurice Dewaele (BEL)
15	20 July	Grenoble to Evian	329 km (204 mi)	Stage with mountain(s)	Julien Vervaecke (BEL)	Maurice Dewaele (BEL)
16	22 July	Evian to Belfort	283 km (176 mi)	Stage with mountain(s)	Charles Pélissier (FRA)	Maurice Dewaele (BEL)
17	23 July	Belfort to Strasbourg	145 km (90 mi)	Plain stage	André Leducq (FRA)	Maurice Dewaele (BEL)
18	24 July	Strasbourg to Metz	165 km (103 mi)	Plain stage	André Leducq (FRA)	Maurice Dewaele (BEL)
19	25 July	Metz to Charleville	159 km (99 mi)	Team time trial	Bernard van Rysselberghe (BEL)	Maurice Dewaele (BEL)
20	26 July	Charleville to Malo-les-Bains	270 km (170 mi)	Team time trial	Maurice Dewaele (BEL)	Maurice Dewaele (BEL)
21	27 July	Malo-les-Bains to Dieppe	234 km (145 mi)	Plain stage	André Leducq (FRA)	Maurice Dewaele (BEL)
22	28 July	Dieppe to Paris	332 km (206 mi)	Plain stage	Nicolas Frantz (LUX)	Maurice Dewaele (BEL)
	Total		5,286 km (3,285 mi)			

=== General classification ===
During the 1929 Tour de France, the cyclists did not race in trade teams, but still the cyclists of the same team cooperated.

Final general classification (1–10)
Rank	Rider	Sponsor	Time
1	Maurice De Waele (BEL)	Alcyon	186h 39' 15"
2	Giuseppe Pancera (ITA)	La Rafale	44' 23"
3	Joseph Demuysere (BEL)	Lucifer	57' 10"
4	Salvador Cardona (ESP)	Fontan–Wolber	57' 46"
5	Nicolas Frantz (LUX)	Alcyon	58' 00"
6	Louis Delannoy (BEL)	La Française	+1h 06' 09"
7	Antonin Magne (FRA)	Alleluia–Wolber	+1h 08' 00"
8	Julien Vervaecke (BEL)	Alcyon	+2h 01' 37"
9	Pierre Magne (FRA)	Alleluia–Wolber	+2h 03' 00"
10	Gaston Rebry (BEL)	Alcyon	+2h 17' 49"

Final general classification (11–60)
Rank	Rider	Sponsor	Time
11	André Leducq (FRA)	Alcyon	+ 2h 24' 51"
12	Frans Bonduel (BEL)	Dilecta-Wolber	+ 2h 52' 35"
13	Désiré Louesse (BEL)	Fontan–Wolber	+ 2h 52' 57"
14	Bernard Van Rysselberghe (BEL)	Dilecta-Wolber	+ 3h 06' 23"
15	Benoit Faure (FRA)	Touriste-Routier	+ 3h 33' 29"
16	Marcel Bidot (FRA)	La Française	+ 3h 40' 49"
17	Armand Van Bruaene (BEL)	De Dion Bouton-Wolber	+ 4h 11' 54"
18	Charles Govaert (BEL)	Elvish-Wolber	+ 4h 14' 24"
19	Francis Bouillet (FRA)	Lucifer	+ 5h 07' 51"
20	Ernest Neuhard (FRA)	De Dion Bouton-Wolber	+ 5h 45' 12"
21	Omer Taverne (BEL)	Touriste-Routier	+ 5h 49' 39"
22	Léon Chene (FRA)	Alleluia–Wolber	+ 6h 00' 07"
23	Jules Merviel (FRA)	La Rafale	+ 6h 05' 02"
24	Mario Pomposi (ITA)	Dilecta-Wolber	+ 6h 14' 09"
25	Georges Laloup (FRA)	Touriste-Routier	+ 6h 30' 50"
26	Settimo Innocenti (ITA)	La Rafale	+ 6h 43' 53"
27	Julien Perrain (FRA)	Elvish-Wolber	+ 8h 31' 45"
28	Charles Pélissier (FRA)	J.B. Louvet-Wolber	+ 8h 54' 03"
29	Georges Berton (FRA)	Touriste-Routier	+ 8h 55' 50"
30	Roger Gregoire (FRA)	Lucifer	+ 9h 50' 15"
31	Hector Denis (FRA)	Touriste-Routier	+ 10h 26' 25"
32	Charles Martinet (SUI)	Touriste-Routier	+ 10h 33' 00"
33	Auguste Encrine (FRA)	Touriste-Routier	+ 11h 32' 17"
34	Albert Jordens (BEL)	Touriste-Routier	+ 11h 35' 10"
35	Adrien Plautin (FRA)	Touriste-Routier	+ 11h 36' 51"
36	Jean Preuss (FRA)	Touriste-Routier	+ 12h 13' 56"
37	Guerrino Canova (ITA)	Touriste-Routier	+ 12h 22' 38"
38	François Moreels (FRA)	Touriste-Routier	+ 12h 38' 15"
39	Henri Touzard (FRA)	Touriste-Routier	+ 12h 41' 44"
40	Roger Lebas (FRA)	Touriste-Routier	+ 13h 08' 33"
41	Marcel Mazeyrat (FRA)	Touriste-Routier	+ 13h 27' 23"
42	Leopold Boisselle (FRA)	Touriste-Routier	+ 13h 49' 49"
43	Guy Bariffi (SUI)	Touriste-Routier	+ 14h 07' 34"
44	Paul Delbart (FRA)	Touriste-Routier	+ 15h 06' 16"
45	Henri Thomas (FRA)	Touriste-Routier	+ 16h 27' 38"
46	Robert Recordon (SUI)	Touriste-Routier	+ 16h 36' 50"
47	Eugène Greau (FRA)	Touriste-Routier	+ 16h 49' 47"
48	Edouard Teisseire (FRA)	Touriste-Routier	+ 17h 09' 50"
49	Battista Berardi (ITA)	Touriste-Routier	+ 19h 14' 16"
50	Georges Petit (FRA)	Touriste-Routier	+ 19h 57' 59"
51	Eugen Werner (SUI)	Touriste-Routier	+ 21h 20' 17"
52	Marcel Masson (FRA)	Touriste-Routier	+ 21h 52' 55"
53	Henri Prevost (FRA)	Touriste-Routier	+ 22h 14' 52"
54	Marcel Gendrin (FRA)	Touriste-Routier	+ 22h 24' 53"
55	François Ondet (FRA)	Touriste-Routier	+ 22h 30' 00"
56	Charles Cottalorda (FRA)	Touriste-Routier	+ 23h 06' 13"
57	Emile Faillu (FRA)	Touriste-Routier	+ 24h 50' 41"
58	Paul Denis (FRA)	Touriste-Routier	+ 25h 17' 57"
59	Marcel Ilpide (FRA)	Touriste-Routier	+ 26h 08' 50"
60	André Leger (FRA)	Touriste-Routier	+ 31h 37' 55"

=== Other classifications ===
The organisers, from the newspaper l'Auto, named a meilleur grimpeur (best climber), an unofficial precursor to the modern King of the Mountains competition. This award was won by Victor Fontan.

== Aftermath ==
After Victor Fontan had to give up in the tenth stage because of mechanical problems while he was leading the race, journalist Louis Delblat wrote that the rules should be changed, because a Tour should not be lost because of mechanical problems. Eventually the rule changed, but only after Tour director Henri Desgrange retired.

The team-time-trial format, which had been introduced to equalize power between the teams, had completely failed. It was removed for the 1930 Tour de France. Between 1935 and 1937, the concept was seen back, and returned again in 1954.

Henri Desgrange was angry at the outcome of the race. The strongest trade team decided who the winner was, while Desgrange wanted the strongest individual to win. Immediately after the 1929 Tour de France, he announced that he would drastically change the rules for the 1930 Tour de France. He removed the trade teams completely, and replaced them by national teams.

The winner of the race, Dewaele, would never reach his level of 1929 again. In 1931 he ended his Tour de France career with a fifth place.

== Bibliography ==
- Augendre, Jacques (2016). "Guide historique" [Historical guide] (PDF). Tour de France (in French). Paris: Amaury Sport Organisation. Archived (PDF) from the original on 17 August 2016.
- McGann, Bill; McGann, Carol (2006). The Story of the Tour de France: 1903–1964. Vol. 1. Indianapolis, IN: Dog Ear Publishing. ISBN 978-1-59858-180-5.
