= 1929 Tour of the Basque Country =

Race details
- Dates: 7–11 August 1929
- Stages: 4
- Distance: 723 km (449 mi)
- Winning time: 24h 27' 55"

Results
	Winner	Maurice De Waele (BEL)
	Second	Marcel Bidot (FRA)
	Third	Nicolas Frantz (LUX)

The 1929 Tour of the Basque Country was the sixth edition of the Tour of the Basque Country cycle race and was held from 7 August to 11 August 1929. The race started in Bilbao and finished in Las Arenas. The race was won by Maurice De Waele.

== General classification ==
Final general classification

Rank	Rider	Time
1	Maurice De Waele (BEL)	24h 27' 55"
2	Marcel Bidot (FRA)	+ 4' 35"
3	Nicolas Frantz (LUX)	+ 7' 16"
4	André Leducq (FRA)	+ 17' 14"
5	Mariano Cañardo (ESP)	+ 28' 22"
6	Julien Vervaecke (BEL)	+ 29' 11"
7	Victor Fontan (FRA)	+ 36' 53"
8	Benoît Faure (FRA)	+ 44' 18"
9	Aimé Déolet (BEL)	+ 46' 48"
10	Salvador Cardona (ESP)	+ 53' 48"
