= 1930 Paris–Tours =

Race details
- Dates: 4 May 1930
- Stages: 1
- Distance: 253 km (157.2 mi)
- Winning time: 7h 00' 25"

Results
	Winner	Jean Maréchal (FRA)
	Second	Marcel Bidot (FRA)
	Third	Frans Bonduel (BEL)

The 1930 Paris–Tours was the 25th edition of the Paris–Tours cycle race and was held on 4 May 1930. The race started in Paris and finished in Tours. The race was won by Jean Maréchal.

== General classification ==
Final general classification

Rank	Rider	Time
1	Jean Maréchal (FRA)	7h 00' 25"
2	Marcel Bidot (FRA)	+ 0"
3	Frans Bonduel (BEL)	+ 48"
4	Bernard Van Rysselberghe (BEL)	+ 48"
5	Charles Pélissier (FRA)	+ 48"
6	Georges Ronsse (BEL)	+ 48"
7	René Brossy (FRA)	+ 48"
7	Nicolas Frantz (LUX)	+ 48"
7	André Leducq (FRA)	+ 48"
7	Jean Aerts (BEL)	+ 48"
