= 1931 Paris–Tours =

Race details
- Dates: 3 May 1931
- Stages: 1
- Distance: 240 km (149.1 mi)
- Winning time: 7h 40' 00"

Results
	Winner	André Leducq (FRA)
	Second	Roger Parioleau (FRA)
	Third	Alfred Haemerlinck (BEL)

The 1931 Paris–Tours was the 26th edition of the Paris–Tours cycle race and was held on 3 May 1931. The race started in Paris and finished in Tours. The race was won by André Leducq.

== General classification ==
Final general classification

Rank	Rider	Time
1	André Leducq (FRA)	7h 40' 00"
2	Roger Parioleau (FRA)	+ 0"
3	Alfred Haemerlinck (BEL)	+ 0"
4	Louis Peglion (FRA)	+ 0"
5	Jean Maréchal (FRA)	+ 0"
6	Frans Bonduel (BEL)	+ 0"
7	Léon Le Calvez (FRA)	+ 0"
8	Bernard Van Rysselberghe (BEL)	+ 0"
9	Marius Guiramand (FRA)	+ 0"
10	Francis Pélissier (FRA)	+ 0"
