= Georges Robert =

Georges Robert may refer to:

- Georges Robert (admiral)
- Georges Robert (cyclist)
- Robert George (ice hockey), mistakenly identified as Georges Robert
