= 1928 Tour of the Basque Country =

Race details
- Dates: 1–5 August 1928
- Stages: 4
- Distance: 762 km (473 mi)
- Winning time: 27h 18' 41"

Results
	Winner	Maurice De Waele (BEL)
	Second	André Leducq (FRA)
	Third	Mariano Cañardo (ESP)

The 1928 Tour of the Basque Country was the fifth edition of the Tour of the Basque Country cycle race and was held from 1 August to 5 August 1928. The race started in Bilbao and finished in Las Arenas. The race was won by Maurice De Waele.

== General classification ==
Final general classification

Rank	Rider	Time
1	Maurice De Waele (BEL)	27h 18' 41"
2	André Leducq (FRA)	+ 12' 20"
3	Mariano Cañardo (ESP)	+ 12' 32"
4	Julien Vervaecke (BEL)	+ 20' 00"
5	Ricardo Montero (ESP)	+ 20' 22"
6	Nicolas Frantz (LUX)	+ 46' 06"
7	Aimé Déolet (BEL)	+ 51' 28"
8	Segundo Barruetabeña (ESP)	+ 1h 00' 52"
9	Valeriano Riera (ESP)	+ 1h 05' 57"
10	Juan Mateu Ribé (ESP)	+ 1h 11' 08"
