= Hector Denis =

Hector Denis may refer to:

- Hector Denis (economist) (1842–1913), Belgian politician, economist, sociologist and university professor
- Hector Denis (cyclist) (1900–1959), French cyclist
