= Guerrino-Angelo Canova =

Italian cyclist

Personal information
- Born: 4 July 1907
- Died: October 1947

Cycling career
- Sport: Cycling
- Discipline: Road
- Role: Rider

Guerrino-Angelo Canova (4 July 1907 – October 1947) was an Italian racing cyclist. He rode in the 1929 Tour de France.
