= Robert Recordon =

Swiss cyclist

Personal information
- Born: 18 July 1905

Cycling career
- Sport: Cycling
- Discipline: Road
- Role: Rider

Robert Recordon (born 18 July 1905, date of death unknown) was a Swiss racing cyclist. He rode in the 1929 Tour de France.
