= Alfonso Crippa =

Italian cyclist

Personal information
- Born: 2 February 1905
- Died: 4 December 1983 (aged 78)

Cycling career
- Sport: Cycling
- Discipline: Road
- Role: Rider

Alfonso Crippa (2 February 1905 – 4 December 1983) was an Italian racing cyclist. He rode in the 1929 Tour de France.
