= 1928 Paris–Roubaix =

Cycling race

Race details
- Dates: 8 April 1928
- Stages: 1
- Distance: 260 km (161.6 mi)
- Winning time: 7h 44' 20"

Results
	Winner	André Leducq (FRA)
	Second	Georges Ronsse (BEL)
	Third	Charles Meunier (BEL)

The 1928 Paris–Roubaix was the 29th edition of the Paris–Roubaix, a classic one-day cycle race in France. The single day event was held on 8 April 1928 and stretched 260 km (162 mi) from Paris to its end in a velodrome in Roubaix. The winner was André Leducq from France.

== Results ==
Final results (1–10)
Rank	Cyclist	Time
1	André Leducq (FRA)	7h 44' 20″
2	Georges Ronsse (BEL)	+0' 00″
3	Charles Meunier (BEL)	+0' 00″
4	Gaston Rebry (BEL)	+0' 20″
5	Achille Souchard (FRA)	+0' 30″
6	Jules Van Hevel (BEL)	+2' 15″
7	Louis Delannoy (BEL)	+2' 20″
8	Maurice Bonney (FRA)	+2' 30″
9	Hector Martin (BEL)	+4' 29″
10	Georges Cuvelier (FRA)	+4' 31″
