= Jean Maréchal =

French cyclist

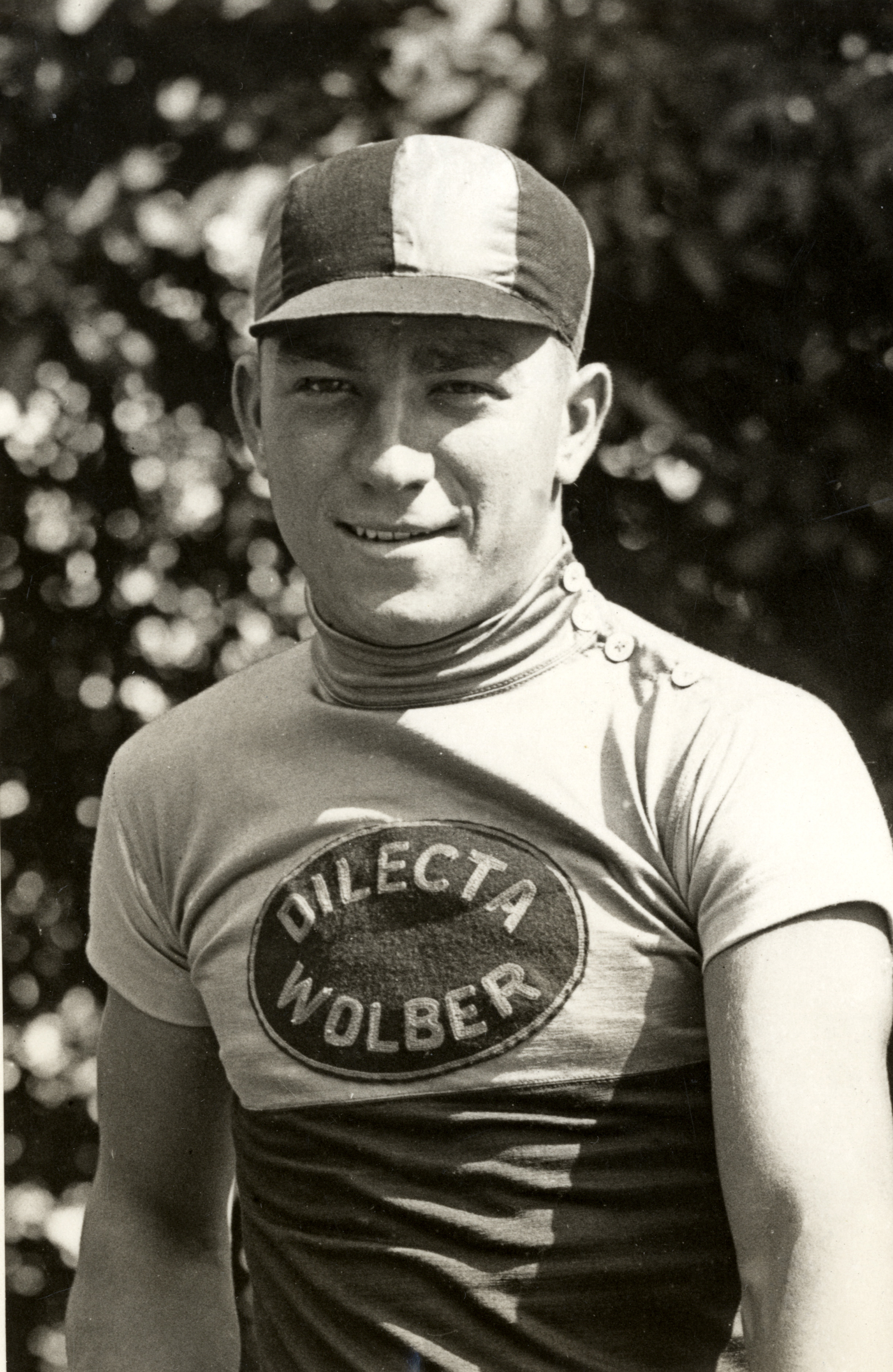

Personal information
- Born: 27 February 1910 Orléans, France
- Died: 23 December 1993 (aged 83) Montigny-le-Bretonneux, France

Cycling career
- Sport: Cycling
- Discipline: Road
- Role: Rider

Jean Maréchal (27 February 1910 – 23 December 1993) was a French racing cyclist, who was professional from 1929 to 1947. He rode in the 1931 Tour de France. He also won the 1930 Paris–Tours.

== Major results ==
1928
1st Paris–Soissons
1929
1st Paris–Soissons
7th Paris–Roubaix
1930
1st Paris–Tours
2nd Paris–Roubaix
1931
1st Critérium des As
1932
3rd Critérium des As
1934
6th Bordeaux–Paris
1940
5th Critérium National
