= Aimé Deolet =

Belgian cyclist

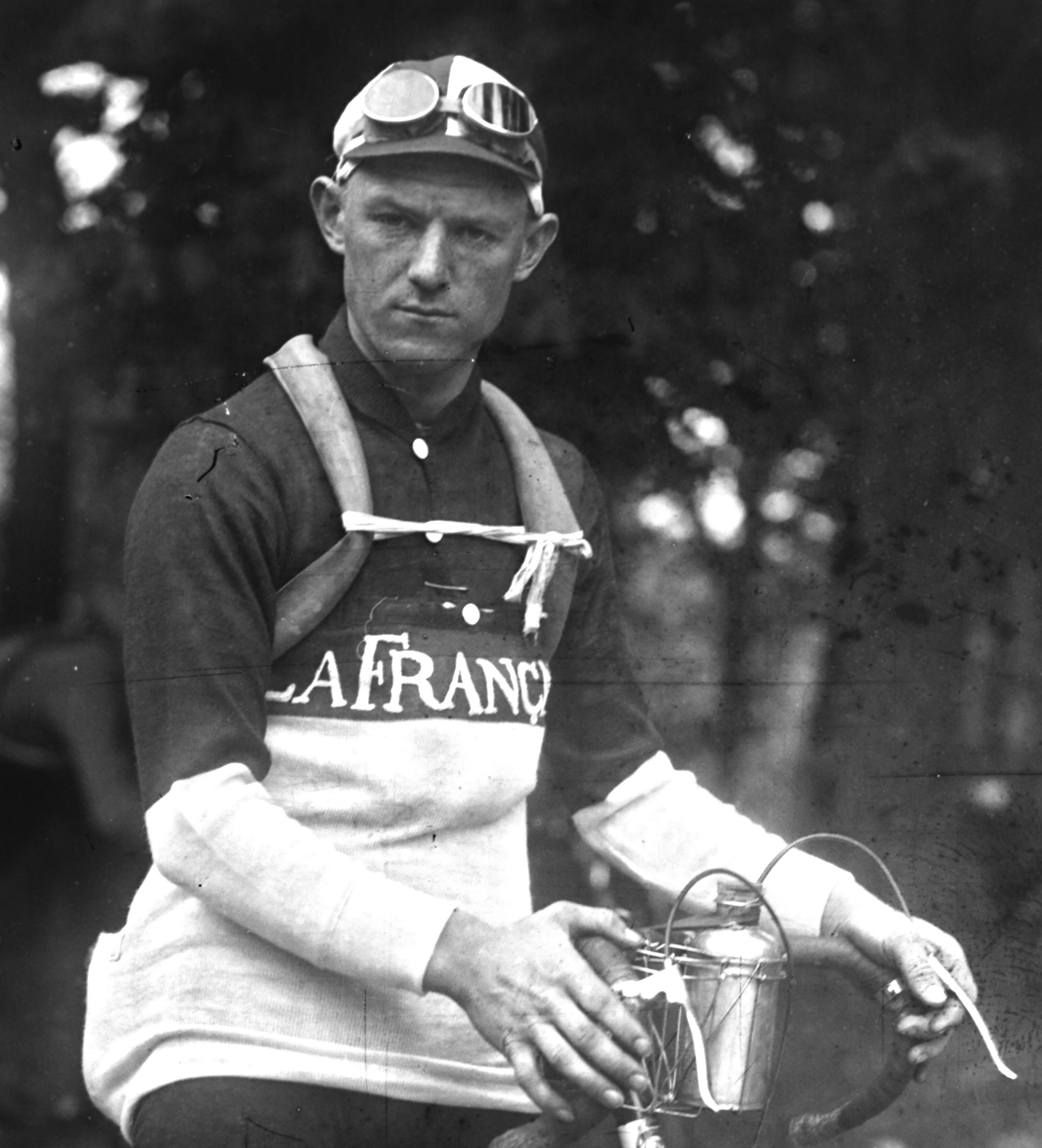
- Aimé Déolet (1929)

Personal information
- Born: 13 March 1906
- Died: 26 June 1986 (aged 80)

Cycling career
- Sport: Cycling
- Discipline: Road
- Role: Rider

Aimé Deolet (13 March 1906 – 26 June 1986) was a Belgian racing cyclist. He rode in the 1929 Tour de France.
