= Charles Meunier =

Belgian cyclist

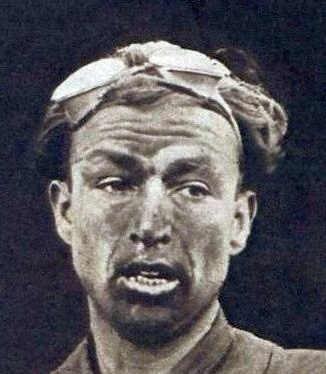
- Charles Meunier, winner of Paris-Roubaix, 31 March 1929

Personal information
- Born: 18 June 1903 Gilly, Belgium
- Died: 17 February 1971 (aged 67) Montignies-sur-Sambre, Belgium

Cycling career
- Sport: Cycling
- Role: Rider

Charles Meunier (18 June 1903 – 17 February 1971) was a Belgian cyclist. He finished third in the 1928 Paris–Roubaix and won the race the following year.
