= André Léger =

French cyclist

Personal information
- Full name: André Léger
- Born: 5 May 1896 Viry-Noureuil, France
- Died: 9 March 1963 (aged 66) Laon, France

Cycling career
- Sport: Cycling
- Role: Rider

André Léger (5 May 1896 – 9 March 1963) was a French racing cyclist. He finished in last place in the 1929 Tour de France.
