= Jean Preuss =

French cyclist

Personal information
- Born: 10 July 1904
- Died: 14 September 1986 (aged 82)

Cycling career
- Sport: Cycling
- Discipline: Road
- Role: Rider

Jean Preuss (10 July 1904 – 14 September 1986) was a French racing cyclist. He rode in the 1929 Tour de France.
