= Léon Chené =

French cyclist (1905–1992)

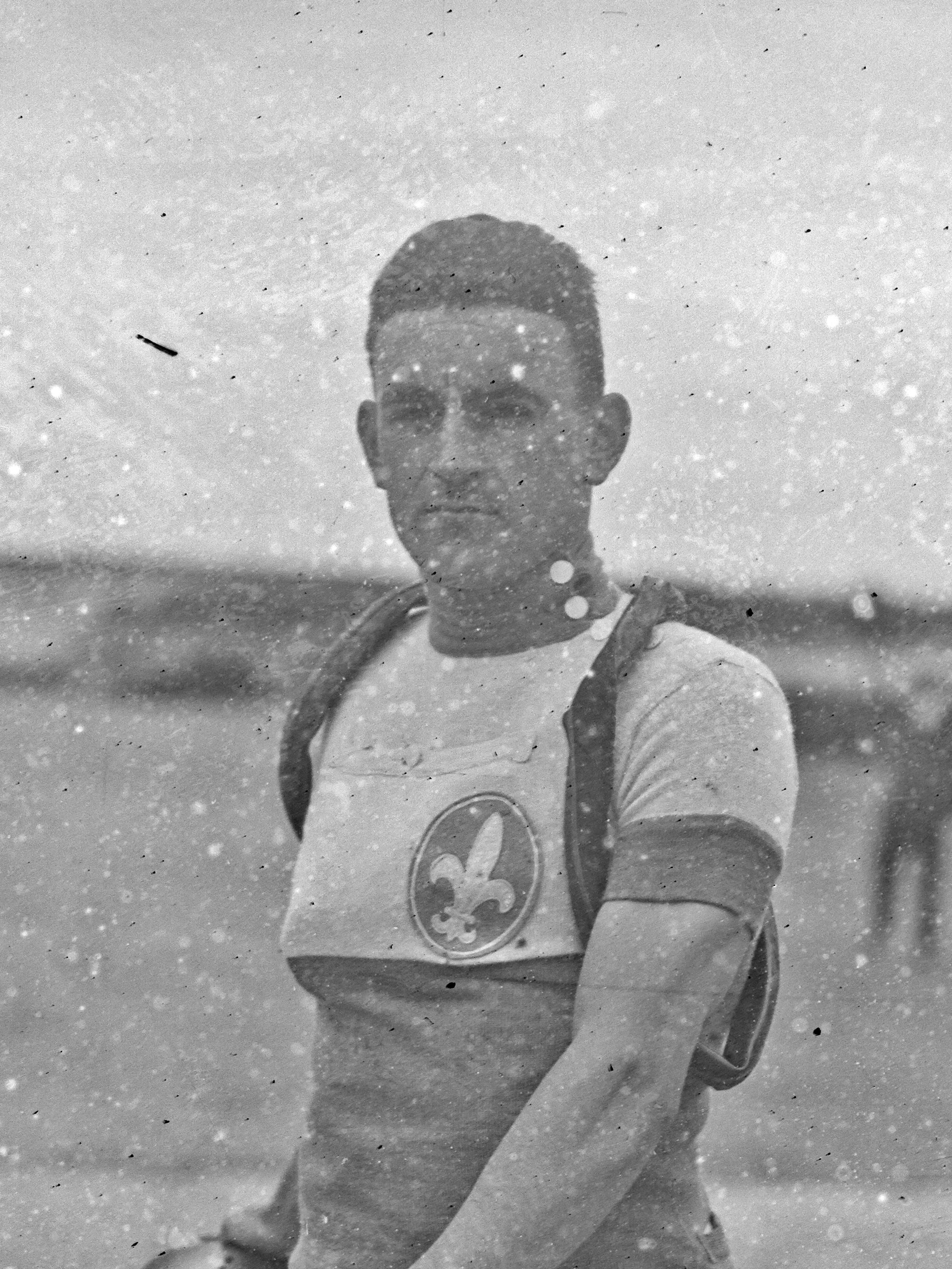

Personal information
- Born: 16 December 1905
- Died: 16 December 1992 (aged 87)

Cycling career
- Sport: Cycling
- Discipline: Road
- Role: Rider

Léon Chené (16 December 1905 – 16 December 1992) was a French racing cyclist. He rode in the 1929 Tour de France.
