= Settimo Innocenti =

Italian cyclist

Personal information
- Born: 10 November 1904
- Died: 29 November 1987 (aged 83)

Cycling career
- Sport: Cycling
- Discipline: Road
- Role: Rider

Settimo Innocenti (10 November 1904 – 29 November 1987) was an Italian racing cyclist. He rode in the 1929 Tour de France.
