= Roger Lebas =

French cyclist

Personal information
- Born: 2 December 1904
- Died: 10 October 1940 (aged 35)

Cycling career
- Sport: Cycling
- Discipline: Road
- Role: Rider

Roger Lebas (2 December 1904 – 10 October 1940) was a French racing cyclist. He rode in the 1928 Tour de France.
