= Paul Le Drogo =

French cyclist

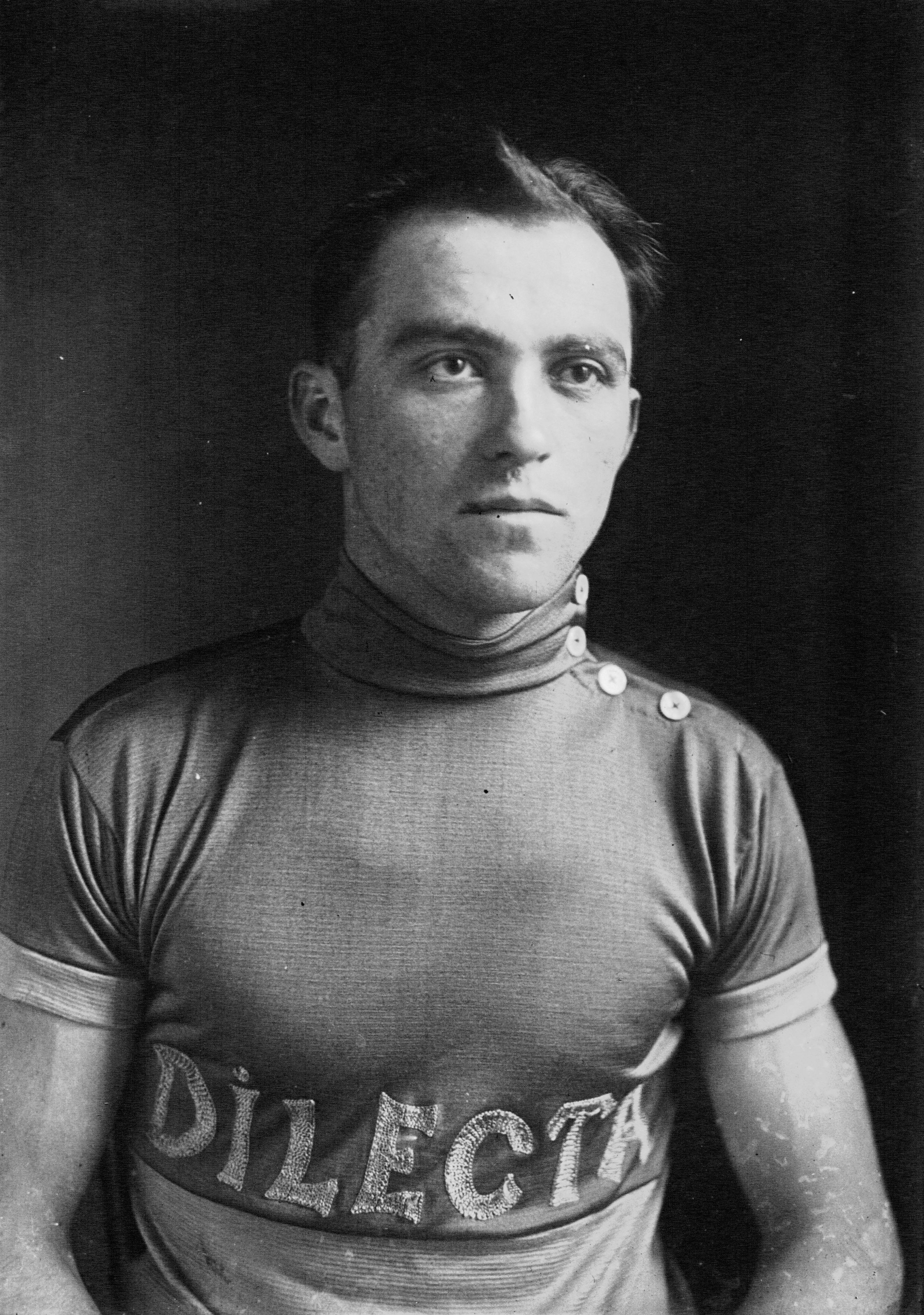
- Paul Le Drogo (1926)

Personal information
- Full name: Paul Le Drogo
- Born: 16 December 1905 Pontivy, France
- Died: 25 July 1966 (aged 60) Sarzeau, France

Cycling career
- Sport: Cycling
- Discipline: Road
- Role: Rider

Major wins
- one stage 1929 Tour de France

Paul Le Drogo (Pontivy, 16 December 1905 — Sarzeau, 25 July 1966) was a French professional road bicycle racer. He was the younger brother of Ferdinand Le Drogo.

== Major results ==
1927
GP Alceida
Lorient
1928
Circuit des As de l'Ouest
GP de la Sarthe
1929
Challenge Lux
Challenge Sigrand
Critérium National de Printemps
Tour de France:

Winner stage 6

1930
Paris - Rennes
1931
GP Cinquantenaire de la Route
1932
Circuit de la Manche
1935
Saint-Brieuc
1936
Saint-Brieuc
