= Henri Thomas (cyclist) =

French cyclist

Personal information
- Born: 27 December 1905
- Died: 18 April 1937 (aged 31)

Cycling career
- Sport: Cycling
- Discipline: Road
- Role: Rider

Henri Thomas (27 December 1905 – 18 April 1937) was a French racing cyclist. He rode in the 1928 Tour de France.
