= Maurice De Waele =

Belgian cyclist

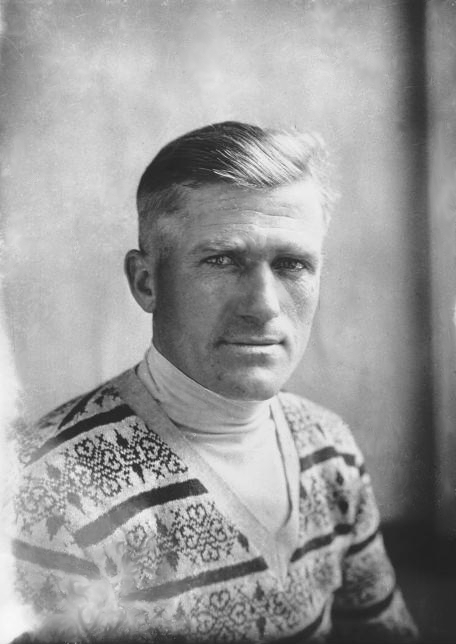
- De Waele at the 1929 Tour de France

Personal information
- Full name: Maurice De Waele
- Born: 27 December 1896 Lovendegem, East Flanders, Belgium
- Died: 14 February 1952 (aged 55) Maldegem, East Flanders, Belgium

Cycling career
- Sport: Cycling
- Discipline: Road
- Role: Rider

Amateur team
- 1921-1922: Individual

Professional teams
- 1923: Wonder-Dunlop
- 1924: Wonder-Russell Cycles
- 1925: Wonder
- 1926: Ravat-Wonder-Dunlop
- 1927: Alcyon-Dunlop, Labor-Dunlop
- 1928-1930: Alcyon-Dunlop
- 1931: Individual

Major wins
- Cyclo-cross National Championships (1922) Road Grand Tours Tour de France General classification (1929) 5 individual stages (1927-1929) Other Stage races Grand Prix Alceida (1924) Criterium du Midi (1926) Tour of the Basque Country (1928, 1929) Tour of Belgium (1931) One-day races and Classics Brussels–Luxembourg–Mondorf (1922) Arlon–Oostende (1923) GP Alceida (1926) Paris–Menen (1926, 1927) Omloop van België (1930)

Maurice De Waele (pronounced [mʌuˈriz də ˈʋaːlə]; 27 December 1896 – 14 February 1952) was a Belgian professional road bicycle racer.

De Waele placed second in the 1927 Tour, an hour and fifty eight minutes behind Nicolas Frantz, and third in 1928, again won by Frantz. However, he is most famous for winning the 1929 Tour de France. He led the Tour until stage seven when two punctures on the way to Bordeaux cost him the yellow jersey to no less than three other riders on the same time in the general classification, Frantz, Andre Leducq and Victor Fontan. Fontan was the sole leader of the race when a broken bike led to his retirement, leaving De Waele in the lead, seventy five seconds ahead of Frantz. However, punctures to De Waele gave the lead to his nearest rival until he too suffered the same problem. With Frantz out of the running for the title, sickness in Grenoble nearly cost him too but with help from his teammates, he was led to victory.

After winning the 1929 Tour, the organiser, Henri Desgrange despaired so much of the trickery that he thought had let such a minor rider succeed that he abandoned commercially sponsored teams and ran the Tour for national teams for two decades. Desgrange had until then insisted that while riders could compete in the name of their sponsors, cooperation or tactics between those riders was not allowed. They were to consider everyone their rival and ride against them whether they had the same sponsor or not.

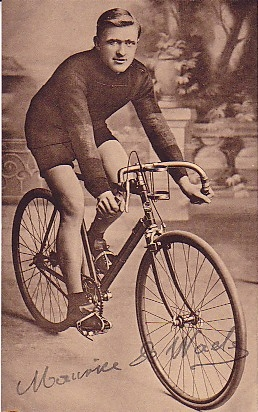
Maurice De Waele publicity picture (before 1932)

De Waele was sponsored by the French bicycle company, Alcyon, whose ability to employ many of the leading riders gave it a dominant place in the sport. Clashes between Alcyon and Desgrange were frequent and came to a head when De Waele won the Tour with the illegal help of other Alcyon riders even though he was ill.

"My Tour has been won by a corpse," Desgrange complained and from the following year denied entries to commercial teams and accepted national teams instead.

De Waele finished 5th in 1931. Other notable wins include the 1928 and 1929 Tour of the Basque Country.

== Career achievements ==
=== Independent ===
1921
1st Overall Tour of Belgium Independents
1922
1st National Cyclo-cross Championships
1st Bruxelles-Luxembourg-Mondorf
1st Bruxelles-Liège (fr)
2nd Belgian National Road Race Championships Independents
2nd Overall Tour of Belgium Independents

1st Stage 3

2nd De Drie Zustersteden
3rd Grand Prix François Faber

=== Professional ===
1923
1st Overall Le Havre-Rouen-Le Havre

1st Stage 2

1st Arlon-Oostende
2nd Belgian National Road Race Championships
2nd Paris–Brussels
2nd Scheldeprijs
3rd National Cyclo-cross Championships
4th Overall Tour of Belgium
5th De Drie Zustersteden
1924
1st Overall Circuit des villes d'eaux d'Auvergne (fr)

1st Stage 1

1st Overall Grand Prix Alceida

1st Stage 1

1st Stage 2 Tour of Belgium
2nd National Cyclo-cross Championships
2nd De Drie Zustersteden
3rd Kampioenschap van Vlaanderen
6th Liège-Bastogne-Liège
6th Paris–Brussels
7th Paris–Roubaix
8th Tour of Flanders
1925
1st Kampioenschap van Oost-Vlaanderen
1st Balgerhoeke
2nd Overall Tour of Belgium
2nd Kampioenschap van Vlaanderen
3rd Circuit du Massif Central
6th Tour of Flanders
7th Paris–Roubaix

1926
1st Paris-Menin (fr)
1st Circuit Vosges-Alsace
1st Saint-Brieuc-Brest-Saint-Brieuc
1st Grand Prix Alceida
2nd Paris-Saint-Étienne (fr)
3rd Paris-Longwy (fr)
5th Scheldeprijs
6th Paris–Brussels

1927
Tour de France

2nd Overall, @ + 1h 48' 21"
1st, Stage 2 (Dieppe - Le Havre), 103km
1st, Stage 13 (Perpignan - Marseille), 360km

1st Paris-Menin (fr)
3rd Tour of Flanders
3rd Paris–Brussels

1928
Tour de France

3rd Overall, @ + 56' 16"
1st, Stage 8 (Bordeaux - Hendaye), 225km
1st, Stage 20 (Charleville - Malo-les-Bains), 271km

1st Overall Tour of the Basque Country

1st Stage 2

2nd Bordeaux–Paris
6th Paris–Brussels

1929
Tour de France

1st Overall, 5254km in 186h 39' 16" (28.319km/h)
1st, Stage 20 (Charleville - Malo-les-Bains), 270km

1st Overall Tour of the Basque Country

1st Stage 3

2nd Paris–Brussels
2nd Overall Tour of Belgium
3rd Kampioenschap van Vlaanderen
7th Paris–Tours

1930
4th Tour of Flanders
6th Paris–Roubaix

1931
1st Overall Tour of Belgium
1st Lebbeke
5th Overall Tour de France
9th Road race, UCI World Championships

=== Grand Tour results timeline ===
	1927	1928	1929	1930	1931
Giro d'Italia	DNE	DNE	DNE	DNE	DNE
Stages won	—	—	—	—	—
Tour de France	2	3	1	DNE	5
Stages won	2	2	1	—	0
Vuelta a España	N/A	N/A	N/A	N/A	N/A
Stages won	N/A	N/A	N/A	N/A	N/A

Legend
1	Winner
2–3	Top three-finish
4–10	Top ten-finish
11–	Other finish
DNE	Did not enter
DNF-x	Did not finish (retired on stage x)
DNS-x	Did not start (not started on stage x)
HD-x	Finished outside time limit (occurred on stage x)
DSQ	Disqualified
N/A	Race/classification not held
NR	Not ranked in this classification
