= Karel Govaert =

Belgian cyclist

Personal information
- Born: 19 July 1900
- Died: 11 August 1972 (aged 72)

Cycling career
- Sport: Cycling
- Role: Rider

Karel Govaert (19 July 1900 – 11 August 1972) was a Belgian racing cyclist. He rode in the 1923 Tour de France.
