= 1929 Paris–Roubaix =

Cycling race

Race details
- Dates: 31 March 1929
- Stages: 1
- Distance: 260 km (161.6 mi)
- Winning time: 8h 54' 50"

Results
| | Winner | Charles Meunier (BEL) |
| | Second | Georges Ronsse (BEL) |
| | Third | Aimé Déolet (BEL) |

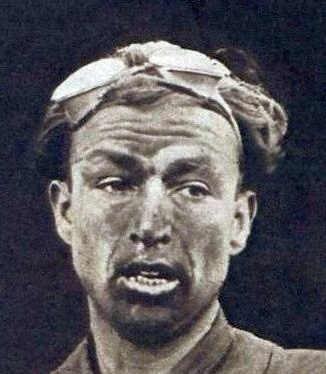
Charles Meunier, Winner of the 1929 Paris-Roubaix

The 1929 Paris–Roubaix was the 30th edition of the Paris–Roubaix, a classic one-day cycle race in France. The single day event was held on 31 March 1929 and stretched 260 km (162 mi) from Paris to its end in a velodrome in Roubaix. The winner was Charles Meunier from Belgium.

== Results ==
Final results (1–5)
| Rank | Cyclist | Time |
|---|---|---|
| 1 | Charles Meunier (BEL) | 8h 54' 50″ |
| 2 | Georges Ronsse (BEL) | +0' 00″ |
| 3 | Aimé Déolet (BEL) | +0' 00″ |
| 4 | Armand Van Bruaene (BEL) | +3' 19″ |
| 5 | Gaston Rebry (BEL) | +3' 19″ |
