= Mario Pomposi =

Italian cyclist

Personal information
- Born: 25 February 1902

Cycling career
- Sport: Cycling
- Discipline: Road
- Role: Rider

Mario Pomposi (born 25 February 1902, date of death unknown) was an Italian racing cyclist. He rode in the 1929 Tour de France.
