= Roger Grégoire =

French cyclist

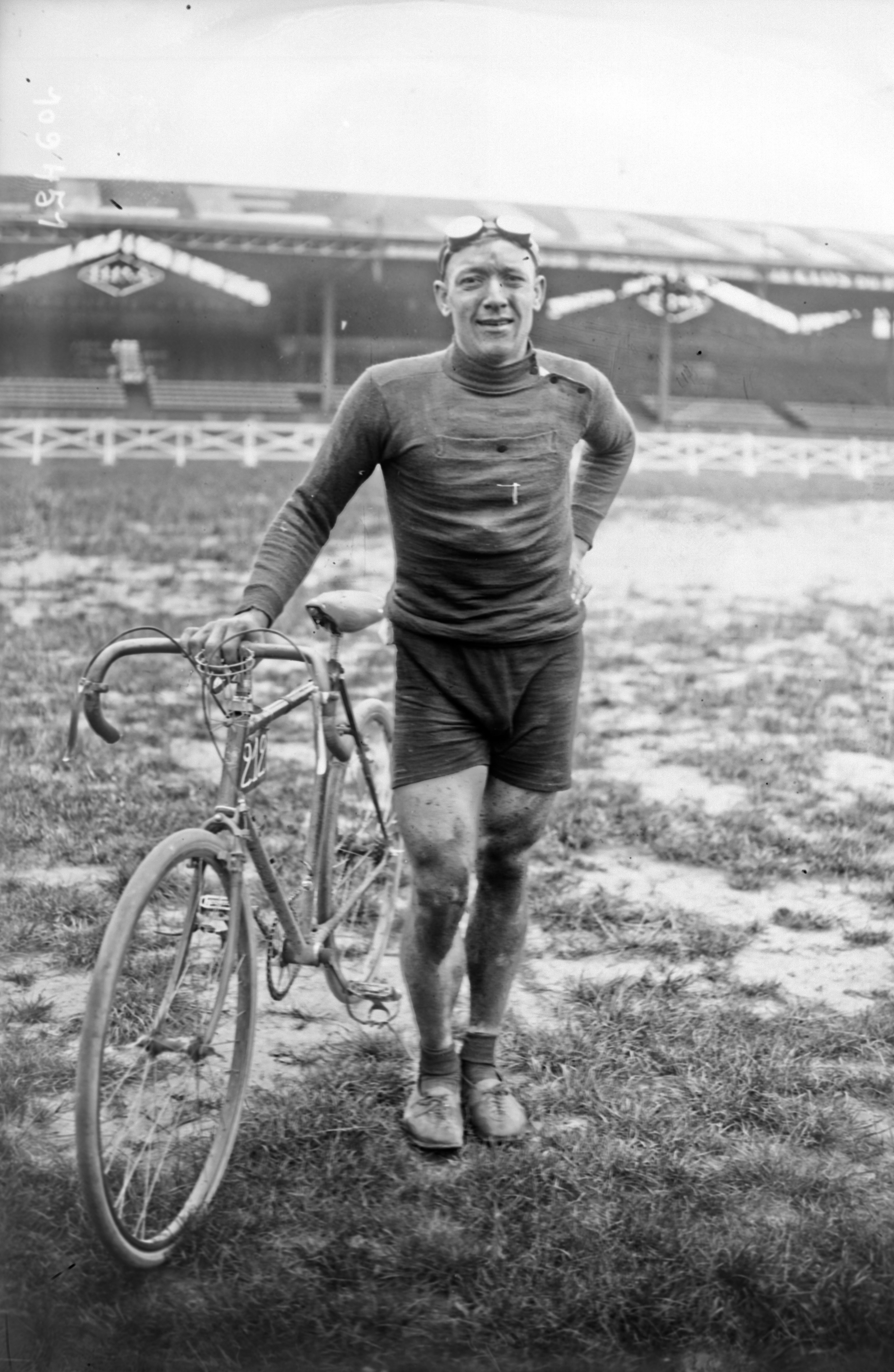
- Gregoire in 1926

Personal information
- Born: 13 December 1903 Nancy, France
- Died: 11 November 1982 (aged 78) Vandœuvre-lès-Nancy, France

Cycling career
- Sport: Cycling
- Discipline: Road
- Role: Rider

Professional teams
- 1927: Peugeot–Dunlop
- 1929: Génial Lucifer–Hutchinson

Roger Grégoire (13 December 1903 – 11 November 1982) was a French racing cyclist. He rode in the 1928 and 1929 Tour de France. He also won the 1927 Paris–Caen.
