= Hector Denis (cyclist) =

French cyclist

Personal information
- Born: 3 November 1900
- Died: 1 May 1959 (aged 58)

Cycling career
- Sport: Cycling
- Discipline: Road
- Role: Rider

Hector Denis (3 November 1900 – 1 May 1959) was a French racing cyclist. He rode in the 1928 Tour de France.
