= Julien Perrain =

French cyclist

Personal information
- Born: 21 June 1902
- Died: 14 April 1950 (aged 47)

Cycling career
- Sport: Cycling
- Discipline: Road
- Role: Rider

Julien Perrain (21 June 1902 – 14 April 1950) was a French racing cyclist. He rode in the 1929 Tour de France.
