= Francis Bouillet =

French cyclist

Personal information
- Born: 7 October 1901
- Died: 10 May 1951 (aged 49)

Cycling career
- Sport: Cycling
- Discipline: Road
- Role: Rider

Francis Bouillet (7 October 1901 – 10 May 1951) was a French racing cyclist. He rode in the 1929 Tour de France.
