= 1930 Paris–Roubaix =

Cycling race

Race details
- Dates: 20 April 1930
- Stages: 1
- Distance: 258 km (160.3 mi)
- Winning time: 8h 11' 14"

Results
	Winner	Julien Vervaecke (BEL)
	Second	Jean Maréchal (FRA)
	Third	Antonin Magne (FRA)

The 1930 Paris–Roubaix was the 31st edition of the Paris–Roubaix, a classic one-day cycle race in France. The single day event was held on 20 April 1930 and stretched 258 km (160 mi) from Paris to its end in a velodrome in Roubaix. The winner was Julien Vervaecke from Belgium.

Jean Maréchal finished 24 seconds ahead of Belgian Julien Vervaecke but was moved to second because, while Maréchal was trying to pass Vervaecke, the Belgian tumbled into a ditch. According to some, Maréchal hit the Belgian's shoulder, causing his fall. Jacques Augendre, historian of the Tour de France, said Maréchal, who was 20, "was riding as an individual for a little bike-maker, Colin, and he got to Roubaix alone. His happiness was short-lived. Arbitrarily accused of having provoked a fall by Julien Vervaecke, with whom he had broken away, he was disqualified without any sort of hearing. Important detail: Vervaecke belonged to the all-powerful Alcyon team, run by the no less powerful Ludovic Feuillet..."

== Results ==
Final results (1–5)
Rank	Cyclist	Time
1	Julien Vervaecke (BEL)	8h 11' 14″
2	Jean Maréchal (FRA)	+0' 00″
3	Antonin Magne (FRA)	+6' 48″
4	Émile Joly (BEL)	+6' 48″
5	Nicolas Frantz (LUX)	+6' 48″
