= Salvador Cardona =

Spanish cyclist (1901–1985)

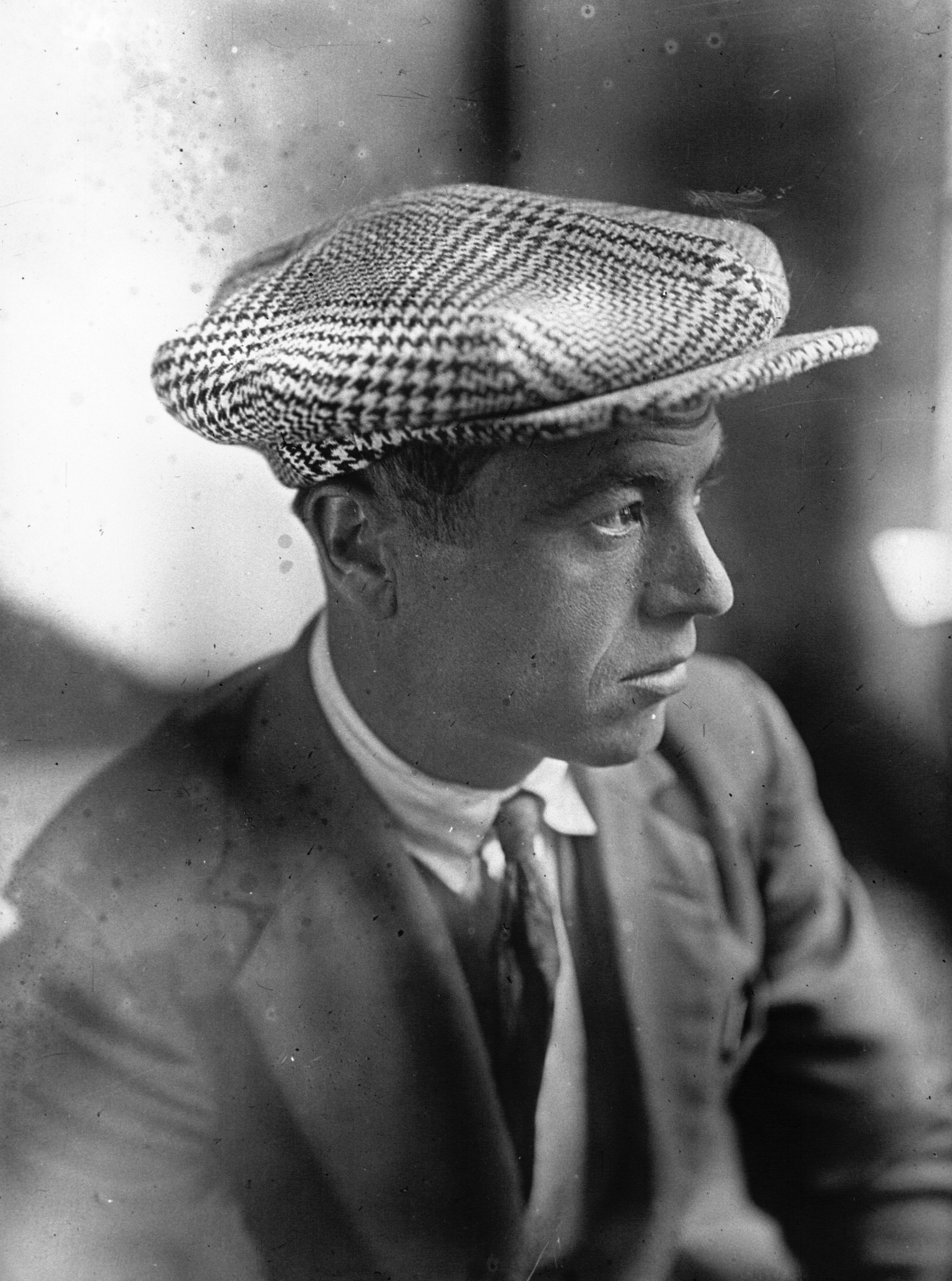

Personal information
- Full name: Salvador Cardona Balbastre
- Born: 12 January 1901 Alfahuir, Valencian Community, Spain
- Died: 15 January 1985 (aged 84) Pau, Pyrénées-Atlantiques, France

Cycling career
- Sport: Cycling
- Discipline: Road
- Role: Rider

Professional teams
- 1928: Elvish
- 1929: Elvish-Fontan
- 1934–1935: Orbea

Major wins
- Spain National Road Cycling Championship (1935); Tour de France, 1 stage Vuelta a España, 2 stages Volta a Catalunya (1931)

Salvador Cardona Balbastre (12 January 1901 - 15 January 1985) was a Spanish professional road racing cyclist from Alfauir. In 1929 he became the first Spanish road bicycle racer to win a stage in Tour de France.

== Major results ==
1929
4th, Overall, Tour de France

1st, Stage 9

1st, Overall, Vuelta a Levante
1931
1st, Overall, Volta a Catalunya
1933
1st, Prueba Villafranca de Ordizia
1st, Overall, Tour of Galicia
1935
Spain National Road Cycling Championship
1st, Stage 6 & 7, Volta a Catalunya
1st, Stage 9, Vuelta a España
1st, Overall, Vuelta a Mallorca
1936
1st, Stage 9, Vuelta a España
