= Adolf Van Bruane =

Belgian cyclist

Personal information
- Born: 17 September 1900
- Died: 10 November 1973 (aged 73)

Cycling career
- Sport: Cycling
- Discipline: Road
- Role: Rider

Adolf Van Bruane (17 September 1900 – 10 November 1973) was a Belgian racing cyclist. He rode in the 1924 Tour de France, where he finished the first three of fifteen stages before dropping out before the end of the fourth stage.
