= Bernard Van Rysselberghe =

Belgian cyclist

- Van Rysselberghe at the 1931 Bordeaux–Paris

Personal information
- Full name: Bernard Van Rysselberghe
- Born: 5 October 1905 Laarne, Belgium
- Died: 25 September 1984 (aged 78) Damme, Belgium

Cycling career
- Sport: Cycling
- Discipline: Road
- Role: Rider

Major wins
- Bordeaux–Paris (1931)

Bernard Van Rysselberghe (5 October 1905 – 25 September 1984) was a Belgian professional road bicycle racer. Van Rysselberghe won one stage in the 1929 Tour de France, and was the winner of the 1931 edition of Bordeaux–Paris.

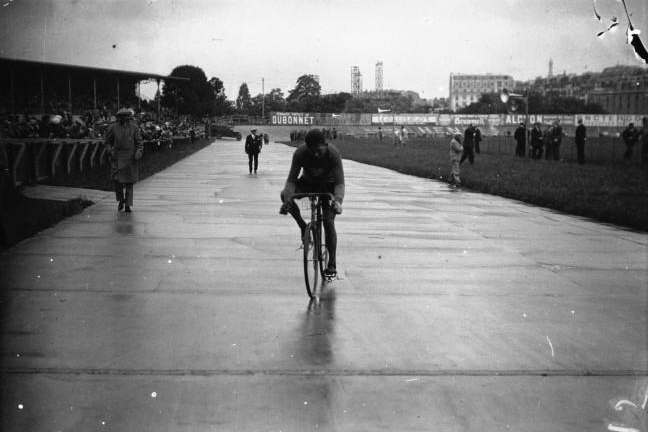
Van Rysselberghe winning 1931 Bordeaux–Paris

Van Rysselberghe was born in Laarne, Belgium and died in Damme, Belgium as the age of 78.

== Major results ==
Van Rysselberghe won the following races during his career.

1929
GP de la Meuse
Tour de France: Stage 18
1931
Bordeaux–Paris
