= Marcel Bidot =

French cyclist

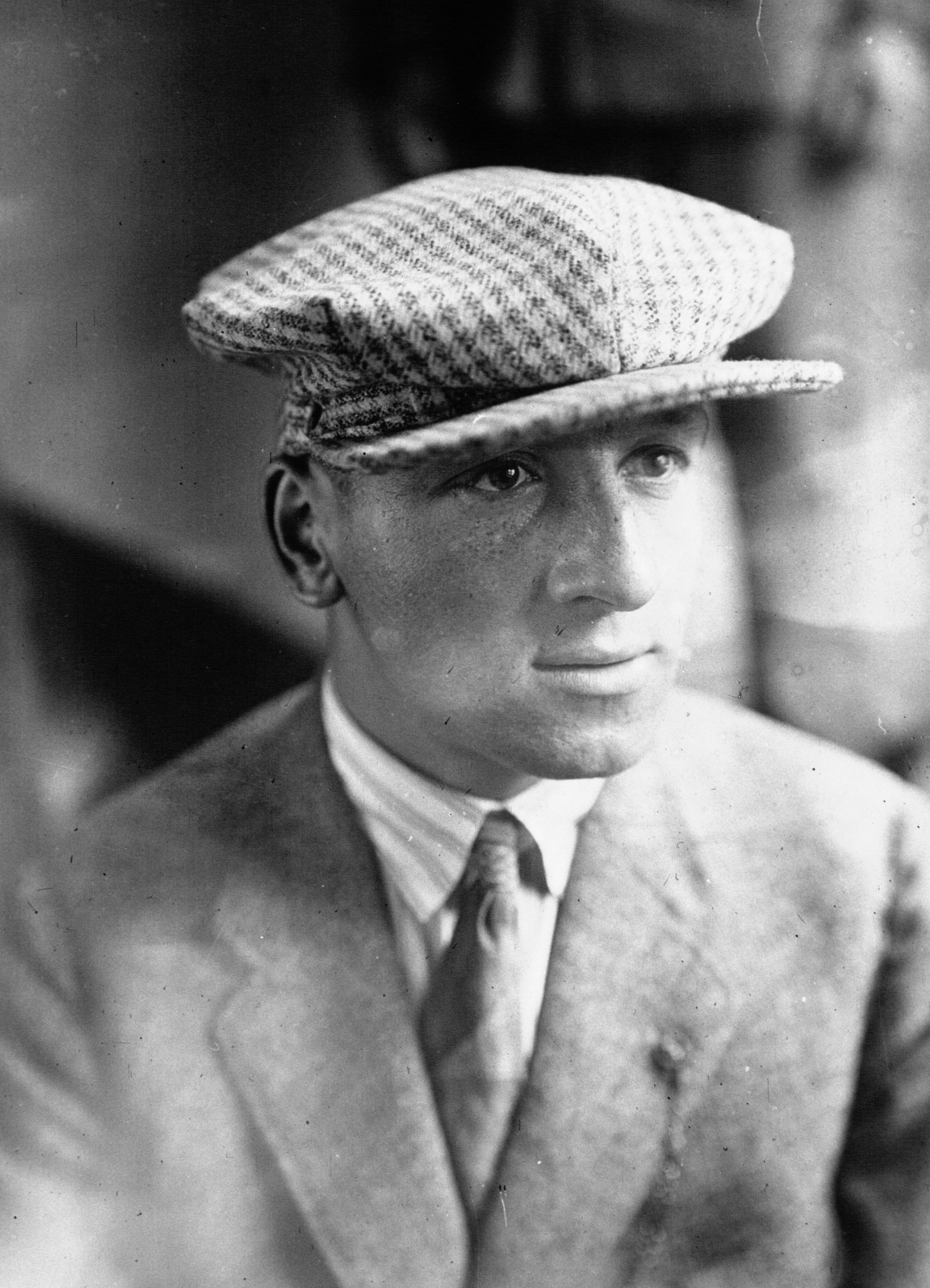

Personal information
- Full name: Marcel Bidot
- Born: 31 December 1902 Paris, France
- Died: 26 January 1995 (aged 92) Saint-Lyé, France

Cycling career
- Sport: Cycling
- Discipline: Road
- Role: Rider

Major wins
- two stages Tour de France

Marcel Bidot (21 December 1902 – 26 January 1995) was a French professional road bicycle racer who won two stages of the Tour de France and became manager of the French national team. He led the team in 12 Tours and won six of them.

== Racing ==
Marcel Bidot was the son of a failed café owner, a former racing cyclist who then ran one of the clubs in his home town of Troyes, in the Champagne region. His son, Marcel, worked for the Crédit Lyonnais bank in the town and rode for his father's club. He went training after work at 7pm. He turned professional in 1923 and at Alcyon earned 2,000 francs a month, ten times his pay at the bank. "At the time you could get a good meal for 20 francs and a newspaper for 25 centimes," he said.

He rode every Tour de France from 1926 to 1930 and then again in 1932. His first was the longest of all Tours, at 5,745 km with a stage of 435 km from Metz to Dunkirk. The organiser, Henri Desgrange, forbade riders from accepting mechanical help after breakdowns and his officials watched him pedalling with one foot after the other pedal broke. He stopped after a while and struggled on with the pedal tied to the crank with a leather strap. The judges finally relented and allowed him to borrow a bike from a spectator, but on condition that he used his own wheels. The bike was too small but Bidot still finished the stage.

That wasn't the end of his troubles. His freewheel broke in the Pyrenees and he could no longer turn the wheel - in the absence of a derailleur, which Desgrange had also banned - to ride a lower gear. He had to ride up the col du Tourmalet and three other passes in the gear in which he had planned to ride down them. The weather was so bad that only half the field reached the end of the stage at Luchon and officials had to search inns and houses along the route to see what had happened to the others.

Bidot punctured on the Izoard and again a judge was there to see he accepted no help. Bidot said:

There I was in the Casse Déserte My fingers were solid with cold and I couldn't unstick the tyre from the rim. I tried to do it with my teeth. Impossible. Several minutes went by and then along came Meunier, the driver of the Alcyon car, and he threw me a penknife. The commissaire made sure I couldn't get to it. 'I forbid you to pick it up,' he said. I had to get the tyre off with a wing-nut.'

Of that 1926 Tour he said:

We used to set off at midnight and finish the following night, with hours between the riders. The racing was in the last 100km. We used to put two or three tubular tyres round our shoulders and even that wasn't enough. In the rain, the mountain roads became bogs. A lot of riders had wired-on tyres and no brakes. There was no tar on the roads, only stones and rocks.

Bidot's best placing in the Tour was fifth, in 1930, the first year of national teams. His prizes, 51,900 francs, bought him his house in St-Lyé. He won stages in 1928 and 1929 and was national champion in 1929.

== Management ==
France insisted that the managers of its national teams had no interest in any of the riders' sponsors. The team was run through the 1950s by Jean Bidot, his brother. He took on a job with the Simplex derailleur company and Marcel took his place in 1952. He continued to work in the wine trade.

He led the national team in 12 Tours and won six of them. His career ended when the Tour returned to sponsored teams in 1961.

== Teams ==
1926: Thomann-Dunlop 1928: Allelulia-Wolber 1929: La Française-Dunlop

== Major results ==
1924
Paris-Bourges
1925
Paris-Montargis
Paris-Reims-Troyes
1928
Marseille-Lyon
Tour de France:

Winner stage 5
8th

1929
France national road championship
Tour de France:

Winner stage 12

1930
Tour de France:

5th

1931
Circuit d'Allier
1932
Poitiers - Saumur - Poitiers
1934
Circuit des Deux-Sèvres
Paris-Troyes
1936
Circuit des Vosges
