= André Leducq =

French cyclist (1904–1980)

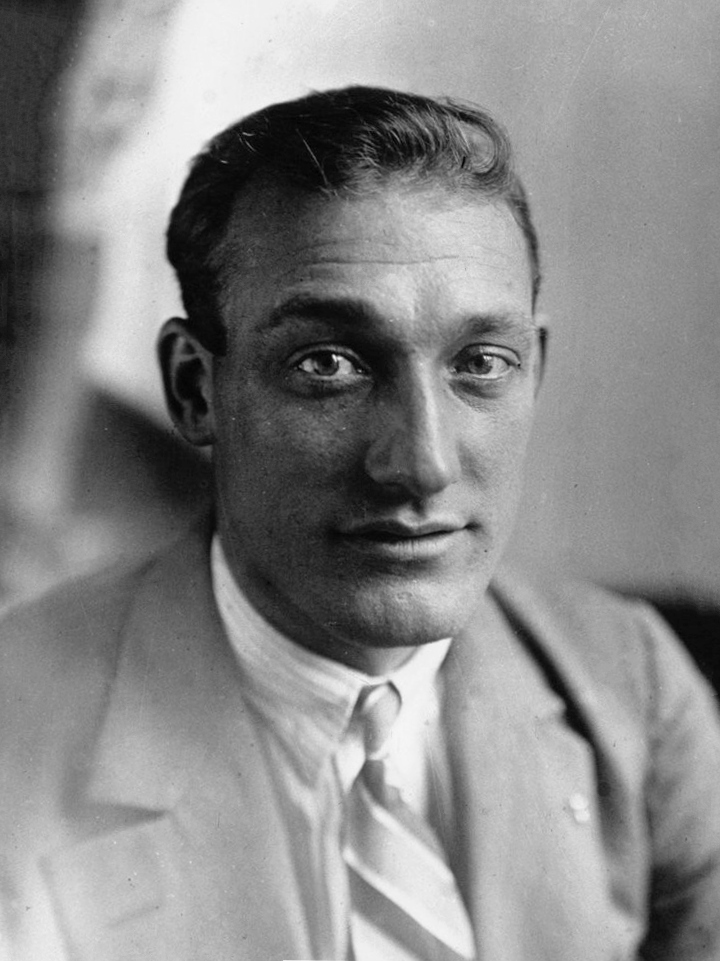
- André Leducq photographed by Agence Meurisse in 1929

Personal information
- Full name: André Leducq
- Nicknames: Le joyeux Dédé (The joyful Dédé); Dédé gueule d'amour et muscles d'acier
- Born: 27 February 1904 Saint-Ouen, France
- Died: 18 June 1980 (aged 76) Marseille, France

Cycling career
- Sport: Cycling
- Discipline: Road
- Role: Rider

Major wins
- Grand Tours Tour de France General classification (1930, 1932) 25 individual stages (1927-1933, 1935, 1938) Stage races Critérium International (1933) One-day races and Classics National Amateur Championships (1925) Paris–Roubaix (1928) Paris–Tours (1931) Paris–Troyes (1923) Paris–Le Havre (1928) Paris–Caen (1930) Critérium des As (1934)
Medal record
Representing France
Men's road bicycle racing
Olympic Games
Gold medal – first place	1924 Paris	team time trial
World Championships
Gold medal – first place	1924 Paris	Amateur's Road Race

André Leducq (pronounced [ɑ̃.dʁe lə.dyk]; 27 February 1904 – 18 June 1980) was a French cyclist who won the 1930 and 1932 Tours de France. He also won a gold medal at the 1924 Summer Olympics in the team road race event and the 1928 Paris–Roubaix.

== Career ==
Leducq was born in Saint-Ouen. He was world champion in 1924 as an amateur before turning professional in 1927. The following year he won Paris–Roubaix and was second in the Tour de France, becoming popular for his humour. His other victories included two Tours de France (he won 25 stages in nine rides) and the 1931 Paris–Tours. He has the fourth-highest number of stage wins in the Tour de France (behind Eddy Merckx, Bernard Hinault, and Mark Cavendish).

After his retirement, he founded a professional cycling team that raced in the 1950s.

== Career achievements ==
=== Major results ===
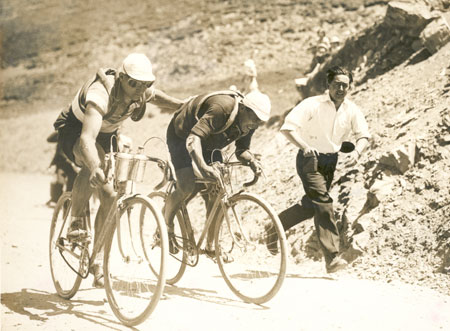
Leducq helped by Georges Speicher in 1933.

1927
Tour de France

4th overall
Stage 6, 23 and 24 wins

1928
Tour de France

2nd overall
Stage 2, 10, 11 and 16 wins

Paris–Roubaix
1929
Tour de France

1 day in yellow jersey
Stage 2, 11, 17, 18 and 21 wins

1930
Tour de France

1st overall
13 days in yellow jersey
Stage 5 and 16 wins

1931
Tour de France

10th overall
Stage 20 win

Paris–Tours
1932
Tour de France

1st overall
19 days in yellow jersey
Stage 3, 11, 13, 15, 20 and 21 wins

1933
Tour de France

31st overall
Stage 13 and 14 wins

Critérium International
1935
Tour de France

17th overall
Stage 18b ITT win

1938
Tour de France

2 days in yellow jersey
Stage 21 win (joint with Antonin Magne)

=== Grand Tour results timeline ===
	1927	1928	1929	1930	1931	1932	1933	1934	1935	1936	1937	1938
Giro d'Italia	DNE	DNE	DNE	DNE	DNE	DNE	DNE	DNE	DNE	DNE	DNE	DNE
Stages won	—	—	—	—	—	—	—	—	—	—	—	—
Mountains classification	N/A	N/A	N/A	N/A	N/A	N/A	—	—	—	—	—	—
Tour de France	4	2	11	1	10	1	31	DNE	17	DNE	DNE	30
Stages won	3	4	5	2	1	6	2	—	1	—	—	1
Mountains classification	N/A	N/A	N/A	N/A	N/A	N/A	NR	—	NR	—	—	NR
Vuelta a España	N/A	N/A	N/A	N/A	N/A	N/A	N/A	N/A	DNE	DNE	N/A	N/A
Stages won	N/A	N/A	N/A	N/A	N/A	N/A	N/A	N/A	—	—	N/A	N/A
Mountains classification	N/A	N/A	N/A	N/A	N/A	N/A	N/A	N/A	—	—	N/A	N/A

Legend
1	Winner
2–3	Top three-finish
4–10	Top ten-finish
11–	Other finish
DNE	Did not enter
DNF-x	Did not finish (retired on stage x)
DNS-x	Did not start (not started on stage x)
HD-x	Finished outside time limit (occurred on stage x)
DSQ	Disqualified
N/A	Race/classification not held
NR	Not ranked in this classification
