= List of cyclists in the 1935 Vuelta a España =

For the 1935 Vuelta a España, the field consisted of 50 riders including 32 Spanish riders; 29 finished the race.

== By rider ==
Legend
No.	Starting number worn by the rider during the Vuelta
Pos.	Position in the general classification
DNF	Denotes a rider who did not finish

No.	Name	Nationality	Pos.	Ref
1	Mariano Cañardo	Spain	2	
2	Francisco Cepeda	Spain	17	
3	Emiliano Alvarez Arana	Spain	DNF	
4	Isidro Figueras	Spain	21	
5	Francisco Mula	Spain	29	
6	Ramón Ruiz Trillo	Spain	26	
7	David Perez	Spain	DNF	
8	Américo Tuero	Spain	19	
9	Francisco De Blas	Spain	DNF	
10	Rafael Pou Sastre	Spain	27	
11	Agustin Gonzalez	Spain	DNF	
12	Antonio Andrés Sancho	Spain	18	
13	Vicente Bachero	Spain	16	
14	Vicente Trueba	Spain	DNF	
15	Manuel Trueba Perez	Spain	DNF	
16	Fermin Trueba Perez	Spain	DNF	
17	Luciano Montero Hernandez	Spain	DNF	
18	Manuel Ruiz Trillo	Spain	DNF	
19	Jaime Pages	Spain	DNF	
20	Salvador Cardona Balbastre	Spain	11	
21	Antonio Escuriet	Spain	DNF	
22	Fédérico Ezquerra	Spain	DNF	
23	Santiago Mostajo Trigo	Spain	DNF	
24	Joaquin Bailon	Spain	23	
25	Juan Gimeno	Spain	13	
26	Antonio Destrieux Lopez	Spain	DNF	
27	Marinus Valentijn	Netherlands	10	
28	Salvador Molina Andrea	Spain	20	
29	Manuel Capella Ros	Spain	DNF	
30	Manuel Gines	Spain	24	
31	Karl Thallinger	Austria	25	
32	Max Bulla	Austria	5	
33	Luigi Barral	Italy	DNF	
34	Edoardo Molinar	Italy	4	
35	Paolo Bianchi	Italy	7	
36	Sébastien Piccardo	Italy	DNF	
37	Antonio Montes	Spain	22	
38	Miguel Carrion Serrano	Spain	DNF	
39	Luis Esteve	Spain	28	
40	Marcel Rocheford	France	DNF	
41	Antoine Dignef	Belgium	3	
42	François Gardier	Belgium	DNF	
43	Alfons Deloor	Belgium	6	
44	Gustaaf Deloor	Belgium	1	
45	Léon Louyet	Belgium	DNF	
46	Walter Blattmann	Switzerland	9	
47	François Adam	Belgium	15	
48	Fernand Fayolle	France	8	
49	Gerrit Vander Ruit	Netherlands	14	
50	Leo Amberg	Switzerland	12	
