= 1935 Vuelta a España, Stage 1 to Stage 7 =

Cycle race

The 1935 Vuelta a España was the 1st edition of the Vuelta a España, one of cycling's Grand Tours. The race began in Madrid on 29 April 1935 and Stage 7 finished in Tortosa on 6 May. The race as a whole finished back in Madrid on 15 May 1935.

The race consisted of 14 stages and 3,425 km (2,128 mi) and the winning average speed was 28.54 km/h (17.73 mph).

== Stage 1 ==
29 April 1935 - Madrid to Valladolid, 185 km (115.0 mi)

Stage 1 result and general classification after Stage 1

Rank	Rider	Time
1	Antoine Dignef (BEL)	5h 58' 12"
2	Mariano Cañardo (ESP)	s.t.
3	Marinus Valentijn (NED)	+ 1' 48"
4	Manuel Capella Ros (ESP)	s.t.
5	Max Bulla (AUT)	+ 1' 58"
6	Fédérico Ezquerra (ESP)	s.t.
7	Gerrit Vander Ruit (NED)	s.t.
8	Luciano Montero Hernandez (ESP)	s.t.
9	Alfons Deloor (BEL)	s.t.
10	Antonio Escuriet (ESP)	s.t.

== Stage 2 ==
30 April 1935 - Valladolid to Santander, 251 km (156.0 mi)

Stage 2 result

Rank	Rider	Time
1	Antonio Escuriet (ESP)	8h 43' 37"
2	Salvador Cardona Balbastre (ESP)	+ 2' 12"
3	Gustaaf Deloor (BEL)	+ 3' 41"
4	Emiliano Alvarez Arana (ESP)	+ 10' 03"
5	Eduardo Molinar (ITA)	+ 14' 08"
6	Marinus Valentijn (NED)	s.t.
7	Sébastien Piccardo (ITA)	s.t.
8	Max Bulla (AUT)	s.t.
9	Walter Blattmann (SUI)	s.t.
10	Gerrit Vander Ruit (NED)	s.t.

General classification after Stage 2

Rank	Rider	Time
1	Antonio Escuriet (ESP)	14h 43' 47"
2	Gustaaf Deloor (BEL)	+ 3' 41"
3	Antoine Dignef (BEL)	+ 12' 11"
4	Mariano Cañardo (ESP)	s.t.
5	Marinus Valentijn (NED)	+ 14' 09"
6	Max Bulla (AUT)	s.t.
7	Fédérico Ezquerra (ESP)	s.t.
8	Gerrit Vander Ruit (NED)	s.t.
9	Luciano Montero Hernandez (ESP)	s.t.
10	Alfons Deloor (BEL)	s.t.

== Stage 3 ==
2 May 1935 - Santander to Bilbao, 199 km (124 mi)

Route:

Stage 3 result

Rank	Rider	Time
1	Gustaaf Deloor (BEL)	6h 43' 09"
2	Eduardo Molinar (ITA)	s.t.
3	Antoine Dignef (BEL)	s.t.
4	Mariano Cañardo (ESP)	s.t.
5	Vicente Trueba (ESP)	s.t.
6	Paolo Bianchi (ITA)	s.t.
7	Luigi Barral (ITA)	+ 8' 43"
8	Alfons Deloor (BEL)	s.t.
9	Max Bulla (AUT)	+ 13' 33"
10	Walter Blattmann (SUI)	s.t.

General classification after stage 3

Rank	Rider	Time
1	Gustaaf Deloor (BEL)	21h 30' 37"
2	Antoine Dignef (BEL)	+ 8' 30"
3	Mariano Cañardo (ESP)	s.t.
4	Vicente Trueba (ESP)	+ 10' 28"
5	Eduardo Molinar (ITA)	+ 10' 33"
6	Luigi Barral (ITA)	+ 19' 03"
7	Alfons Deloor (BEL)	+ 24' 01"
8	Walter Blattmann (SUI)	s.t.
9	Max Bulla (AUT)	s.t.
10	Antonio Escuriet (ESP)	+ 26' 05"

== Stage 4 ==
3 May 1935 - Bilbao to San Sebastián, 235 km (146 mi)

Route:

Stage 4 result

Rank	Rider	Time
1	Antoine Dignef (BEL)	7h 28' 49"
2	Eduardo Molinar (ITA)	s.t.
3	François Adam (BEL)	s.t.
4	Mariano Cañardo (ESP)	s.t.
5	Gustaaf Deloor (BEL)	s.t.
6	Paolo Bianchi (ITA)	s.t.
7	Luigi Barral (ITA)	s.t.
8	Max Bulla (AUT)	+ 1' 52"
9	Léon Louyet (BEL)	s.t.
10	Gerrit Vander Ruit (NED)	s.t.

General classification after Stage 4

Rank	Rider	Time
1	Gustaaf Deloor (BEL)	28h 59' 26"
2	Antoine Dignef (BEL)	+ 8' 30"
3	Mariano Cañardo (ESP)	s.t.
4	Eduardo Molinar (ITA)	+ 10' 33"
5	Luigi Barral (ITA)	+ 19' 11"
6	Vicente Trueba (ESP)	+ 25' 10"
7	Max Bulla (AUT)	+ 25' 53"
8	Walter Blattmann (SUI)	s.t.
9	Alfons Deloor (BEL)	s.t.
10	Paolo Bianchi (ITA)	+ 35' 55"

== Stage 5 ==
4 May 1935 - San Sebastián to Zaragoza, 264 km (164 mi)

Route:

Stage 5 result

Rank	Rider	Time
1	Mariano Cañardo (ESP)	9h 01' 23"
2	Gustaaf Deloor (BEL)	s.t.
3	François Adam (BEL)	s.t.
4	Antoine Dignef (BEL)	s.t.
5	Salvador Cardona Balbastre (ESP)	s.t.
6	Léon Louyet (BEL)	+ 2' 02"
7	Isidro Figueras (ESP)	s.t.
8	Leo Amberg (SUI)	s.t.
9	Marinus Valentijn (NED)	s.t.
10	Luigi Barral (ITA)	s.t.

General classification after Stage 5

Rank	Rider	Time
1	Gustaaf Deloor (BEL)	38h 00' 49"
2	Antoine Dignef (BEL)	+ 8' 30"
3	Mariano Cañardo (ESP)	s.t.
4	Eduardo Molinar (ITA)	+ 12' 35"
5	Luigi Barral (ITA)	+ 21' 13"
6	Walter Blattmann (SUI)	+ 27' 55"
7	Alfons Deloor (BEL)	s.t.
8	Max Bulla (AUT)	+ 28' 44
9	Paolo Bianchi (ITA)	+ 37' 57"
10	Fernand Fayolle (FRA)	+ 39' 01"

== Stage 6 ==
5 May 1935 - Zaragoza to Barcelona, 310 km (190 mi)

Route:

Stage 6 result

Rank	Rider	Time
1	François Adam (BEL)	9h 59' 22"
2	Luigi Barral (ITA)	s.t.
3	Gustaaf Deloor (BEL)	s.t.
4	Antoine Dignef (BEL)	s.t.
5	Max Bulla (AUT)	+ 7"
6	Mariano Cañardo (ESP)	+ 9"
7	Eduardo Molinar (ITA)	s.t.
8	Paolo Bianchi (ITA)	+ 16"
9	Francisco Cepeda (ESP)	+ 17"
10	Juan Gimeno (ESP)	+ 36"

General classification after Stage 6

Rank	Rider	Time
1	Gustaaf Deloor (BEL)	48h 00' 11"
2	Antoine Dignef (BEL)	+ 8' 30"
3	Mariano Cañardo (ESP)	+ 8' 39"
4	Eduardo Molinar (ITA)	+ 12' 44"
5	Luigi Barral (ITA)	+ 21' 13"
6	Alfons Deloor (BEL)	+ 25' 51"
7	Walter Blattmann (SUI)	s.t.
8	Max Bulla (AUT)	+ 28' 51"
9	Paolo Bianchi (ITA)	+ 38' 23"
10	Fernand Fayolle (FRA)	+ 40' 19"

== Stage 7 ==
7 May 1935 - Barcelona to Tortosa, 188 km (117 mi)

Route:

Stage 7 result

Rank	Rider	Time
1	Antonio Montes (ESP)	5h 56' 15"
2	Mariano Cañardo (ESP)	s.t.
3	Max Bulla (AUT)	s.t.
4	Isidro Figueras (ESP)	s.t.
5	Walter Blattmann (SUI)	s.t.
6	Vicente Bachero (ESP)	s.t.
7	Gustaaf Deloor (BEL)	s.t.
8	Marinus Valentijn (NED)	s.t.
9	Salvador Cardona Balbastre (ESP)	s.t.
10	Luigi Barral (ITA)	s.t.

General classification after Stage 7

Rank	Rider	Time
1	Gustaaf Deloor (BEL)	53h 56' 26"
2	Antoine Dignef (BEL)	+ 8' 30"
3	Mariano Cañardo (ESP)	+ 8' 39"
4	Eduardo Molinar (ITA)	+ 12' 44"
5	Luigi Barral (ITA)	+ 21' 13"
6	Max Bulla (AUT)	+ 28' 51"
7	Walter Blattmann (SUI)	+ 25' 51"
8	Alfons Deloor (BEL)	s.t.
9	Paolo Bianchi (ITA)	+ 38' 13"
10	Fernand Fayolle (FRA)	+ 40' 19"
