= 1935 Vuelta a España, Stage 8 to Stage 14 =

Long-distance bicycle race stages

The 1935 Vuelta a España was the 1st edition of Vuelta a España, one of cycling's Grand Tours. The race began in Madrid on 29 April and Stage 8 occurred on 8 May with a stage from Tortosa. The race finished in Madrid on 15 May.

== Stage 8 ==
8 May 1935 - Tortosa to Valencia, 188 km (116.8 mi)

Route:

Stage 8 result

Rank	Rider	Time
1	Max Bulla (AUT)	5h 58' 22"
2	Gerrit Vander Ruit (NED)	s.t.
3	Mariano Cañardo (ESP)	s.t.
4	Gustaaf Deloor (BEL)	s.t.
5	Francisco Cepeda (ESP)	s.t.
6	Isidro Figueras (ESP)	s.t.
7	Ramón Ruiz Trillo (ESP)	s.t.
8	Salvador Cardona Balbastre (ESP)	s.t.
9	Rafael Pou Sastre (ESP)	s.t.
10	Antonio Andrés Sancho (ESP)	s.t.

General classification after stage 8

Rank	Rider	Time
1	Gustaaf Deloor (BEL)	59h 54' 48"
2	Antoine Dignef (BEL)	+ 8' 30"
3	Mariano Cañardo (ESP)	+ 8' 39"
4	Eduardo Molinar (ITA)	+ 12' 54"
5	Luigi Barral (ITA)	+ 22' 10"
6	Max Bulla (AUT)	+ 29' 01"
7	Walter Blattmann (SUI)	+ 29' 13"
8	Alfons Deloor (BEL)	s.t.
9	Paolo Bianchi (ITA)	+ 38' 19"
10	Fernand Fayolle (FRA)	+ 40' 18"

== Stage 9 ==
9 May 1935 - Valencia to Murcia, 265 km (164.7 mi)

Stage 9 result

Rank	Rider	Time
1	Salvador Cardona Balbastre (ESP)	9h 13' 59"
2	Mariano Cañardo (ESP)	s.t.
3	Francisco Cepeda (ESP)	+ 16"
4	Isidro Figueras (ESP)	s.t.
5	Ramón Ruiz Trillo (ESP)	s.t.
6	Américo Tuero (ESP)	s.t.
7	Rafael Pou Sastre (ESP)	s.t.
8	Antonio Andrés Sancho (ESP)	s.t.
9	Vicente Bachero (ESP)	s.t.
10	Manuel Ruiz Trillo (ESP)	s.t.

General classification after stage 9

Rank	Rider	Time
1	Gustaaf Deloor (BEL)	69h 08' 47"
2	Antoine Dignef (BEL)	+ 8' 30"
3	Mariano Cañardo (ESP)	+ 8' 39"
4	Eduardo Molinar (ITA)	+ 12' 54"
5	Luigi Barral (ITA)	+ 22' 10"
6	Max Bulla (AUT)	+ 28' 51"
7	Walter Blattmann (SUI)	+ 29' 13"
8	Alfons Deloor (BEL)	+ 35' 51"
9	Paolo Bianchi (ITA)	+ 39' 13"
10	Fernand Fayolle (FRA)	+ 40' 18"

== Stage 10 ==
10 May 1935 - Murcia to Granada, 285 km (177.1 mi)

Stage 10 result

Rank	Rider	Time
1	Max Bulla (AUT)	11h 15' 55"
2	François Adam (BEL)	s.t.
3	Vicente Bachero (ESP)	s.t.
4	Leo Amberg (SUI)	s.t.
5	Mariano Cañardo (ESP)	s.t.
6	Gustaaf Deloor (BEL)	s.t.
7	Eduardo Molinar (ITA)	+ 14"
8	Joaquin Bailon (ESP)	+ 55"
9	Salvador Cardona Balbastre (ESP)	+ 1' 01"
10	Paolo Bianchi (ITA)	+ 1' 07"

General classification after stage 10

Rank	Rider	Time
1	Gustaaf Deloor (BEL)	80h 24' 43"
2	Mariano Cañardo (ESP)	+ 8' 42"
3	Antoine Dignef (BEL)	+ 9' 40"
4	Eduardo Molinar (ITA)	+ 10' 07"
5	Luigi Barral (ITA)	+ 24' 19"
6	Max Bulla (AUT)	+ 28' 40"
7	Walter Blattmann (SUI)	+ 30' 19"
8	Alfons Deloor (BEL)	+ 36' 57"
9	Paolo Bianchi (ITA)	+ 39' 19"
10	Fernand Fayolle (FRA)	+ 42' 28"

== Stage 11 ==
11 May 1935 - Granada to Sevilla, 260 km (161.6 mi)

Stage 11 result

Rank	Rider	Time
1	Gustaaf Deloor (BEL)	9h 59' 03"
2	Max Bulla (AUT)	s.t.
3	Mariano Cañardo (ESP)	s.t.
4	Salvador Cardona Balbastre (ESP)	s.t.
5	Antoine Dignef (BEL)	s.t.
6	Isidro Figueras (ESP)	s.t.
7	Américo Tuero (ESP)	s.t.
8	Antonio Andrés Sancho (ESP)	s.t.
9	Vicente Bachero (ESP)	s.t.
10	Juan Gimeno (ESP)	s.t.

General classification after stage 11

Rank	Rider	Time
1	Gustaaf Deloor (BEL)	90h 23' 45"
2	Mariano Cañardo (ESP)	+ 8' 39"
3	Antoine Dignef (BEL)	+ 9' 41"
4	Eduardo Molinar (ITA)	+ 13' 13"
5	Luigi Barral (ITA)	+ 24' 20"
6	Max Bulla (AUT)	+ 28' 51"
7	Walter Blattmann (SUI)	+ 30' 20"
8	Alfons Deloor (BEL)	+ 36' 58"
9	Paolo Bianchi (ITA)	+ 39' 20"
10	Fernand Fayolle (FRA)	+ 42' 29"

== Stage 12 ==
13 May 1935 - Sevilla to Cáceres, 270 km (167.8 mi)

Route:

Stage 12 result

Rank	Rider	Time
1	François Adam (BEL)	10h 01' 18"
2	Max Bulla (AUT)	+ 55"
3	Gustaaf Deloor (BEL)	s.t.
4	Isidro Figueras (ESP)	s.t.
5	Eduardo Molinar (ITA)	s.t.
6	Antonio Montes (ESP)	s.t.
7	Karl Thallinger (AUT)	s.t.
8	Mariano Cañardo (ESP)	s.t.
9	Francisco Cepeda (ESP)	s.t.
10	Rafael Pou Sastre (ESP)	s.t.

General classification after stage 12

Rank	Rider	Time
1	Gustaaf Deloor (BEL)	100h 25' 03"
2	Mariano Cañardo (ESP)	+ 8' 09"
3	Antoine Dignef (BEL)	+ 9' 41"
4	Eduardo Molinar (ITA)	+ 13' 08"
5	Luigi Barral (ITA)	+ 24' 20"
6	Max Bulla (AUT)	+ 28' 51"
7	Alfons Deloor (BEL)	+ 36' 58"
8	Paolo Bianchi (ITA)	+ 39' 20"
9	Walter Blattmann (SUI)	+ 40' 26"
10	Fernand Fayolle (FRA)	+ 42' 29"

== Stage 13 ==
14 May 1935 - Cáceres to Zamora, 275 km (171 mi)

Route:

Stage 13 result

Rank	Rider	Time
1	Eduardo Molinar (ITA)	10h 12' 48"
2	Gustaaf Deloor (BEL)	s.t.
3	Max Bulla (AUT)	s.t.
4	Leo Amberg (SUI)	s.t.
5	Karl Thallinger (AUT)	s.t.
6	Salvador Cardona Balbastre (ESP)	s.t.
7	Juan Gimeno (ESP)	s.t.
8	Marinus Valentijn (NED)	s.t.
9	Luis Esteve (ESP)	s.t.
10	Alfons Deloor (BEL)	s.t.

General classification after stage 13

Rank	Rider	Time
1	Gustaaf Deloor (BEL)	110h 37' 51"
2	Antoine Dignef (BEL)	+ 9' 41"
3	Eduardo Molinar (ITA)	+ 13' 08"
4	Mariano Cañardo (ESP)	+ 13' 28"
5	Max Bulla (AUT)	+ 28' 51"
6	Alfons Deloor (BEL)	+ 36' 58"
7	Paolo Bianchi (ITA)	+ 41' 22"
8	Fernand Fayolle (FRA)	+ 42' 29"
9	Walter Blattmann (SUI)	+ 58' 43"
10	Marinus Valentijn (NED)	+ 59' 17"

== Stage 14 ==
15 May 1935 - Zamora to Madrid, 250 km (160 mi)

Route:

Stage 14 result

Rank	Rider	Time
1	Gustaaf Deloor (BEL)	9h 22' 14"
2	Mariano Cañardo (ESP)	s.t.
3	Max Bulla (AUT)	s.t.
4	Leo Amberg (SUI)	+ 10' 15"
5	Vicente Bachero (ESP)	+ 10' 31"
6	Francisco Cepeda (ESP)	s.t.
7	Isidro Figueras (ESP)	s.t.
8	Gerrit Vander Ruit (NED)	s.t.
9	Juan Gimeno (ESP)	s.t.
10	Salvador Cardona Balbastre (ESP)	s.t.

General classification after stage 14

Rank	Rider	Time
1	Gustaaf Deloor (BEL)	120h 00' 07"
2	Mariano Cañardo (ESP)	+ 13' 28"
3	Antoine Dignef (BEL)	+ 20' 10"
4	Max Bulla (AUT)	+ 28' 51"
5	Eduardo Molinar (ITA)	+ 29' 49"
6	Alfons Deloor (BEL)	+ 47' 27"
7	Paolo Bianchi (ITA)	+ 51' 51"
8	Fernand Fayolle (FRA)	+ 52' 58"
9	Walter Blattmann (SUI)	+ 1h 09' 02"
10	Marinus Valentijn (NED)	+ 1h 09' 46"
