= List of cyclists in the 1936 Vuelta a España =

For the 1936 Vuelta a España, the field consisted of 53 riders; 26 finished the race.

== By rider ==
Legend
No.	Starting number worn by the rider during the Vuelta
Pos.	Position in the general classification
DNF	Denotes a rider who did not finish
DNS	Denotes a rider who did not start

No.	Name	Nationality	Pos.
1	Mariano Cañardo	Spain	10
2	Salvador Cardona	Spain	18
3	Antonio Escuriet	Spain	5
4	Antonio Rodriguez	Spain	DNF
5	Emiliano Álvarez	Spain	8
6	Antonio Montes	Spain	DNF
7	Salvador Molina	Spain	14
8	Telmo García	Spain	DNF
9	Francisco Goenaga	Spain	13
10	Vicente Trueba	Spain	DNF
11	Fermín Trueba	Spain	9
12	Julián Berrendero	Spain	4
13	José Riestra	Spain	DNF
14	Cipriano Elys	Spain	12
15	Claudio Leturiaga	Spain	DNF
16	Joaquin Bailon	Spain	16
17	Lisardo Acosta	Spain	DNF
18	Manuel Izquierdo	Spain	DNF
19	Bautista Salom	Spain	17
20	Luis Esteve	Spain	22
21	Andres Martinez	Spain	DNF
22	Enrique López	Spain	DNF
23	Agustin Gonzalez	Spain	20
24	Julian Cabrera	Spain	DNF
25	Delio Rodríguez	Spain	24
26	Miguel Carrion	Spain	19
27	Andres Jaen	Spain	DNS
28	Bartolomé Flaquer	Spain	DNF
29	Antonio Jareno	Spain	DNF
30	Antonio Destrieux	Spain	DNF
31	Ramon Cruz	Spain	15
32	Benito Cabestreros	Spain	25
33	Antonio Andrés Sancho	Spain	DNF
34	Bernardo De Castro	Spain	DNF
35	Miguel Valero	Spain	23
36	Marcelino Sanchez	Spain	DNF
37	Manuel Capella	Spain	DNF
38	Ramon Ruiz Trillo	Spain	26
39	José Arias	Spain	DNF
40	Gregorio Idigoras	Spain	DNF
41	Vicente Carretero	Spain	11
42	Pablo Pantoja	Spain	DNF
43	Antonio Bertola	Italy	3
44	Angel Bertola	Italy	21
45	Edoardo Molinar	Italy	DNS
46	Luigi Barral	Italy	DNF
47	Gustaaf Deloor	Belgium	1
48	Alfons Deloor	Belgium	2
49	Joseph Huts	Belgium	DNF
50	Alphonse Schepers	Belgium	7
51	Camillo Erba	Italy	DNF
52	Antonio Acosta	Spain	DNF
53	Rafael Ramos	Spain	6
