= 1936 Vuelta a España, Stage 12 to Stage 21 =

Long-distance bicycle race stages

The 1936 Vuelta a España was the 2nd edition of Vuelta a España, one of cycling's Grand Tours. The race began in Madrid on 5 May and Stage 12 occurred on 19 May with a stage from Zaragoza. The race finished in Madrid on 31 May.

== Stage 12 ==
19 May 1936 - Zaragoza to San Sebastián, 265 km (164.7 mi)

Stage 12 result

Rank	Rider	Time
1	Alphonse Schepers (BEL)	9h 54' 34"
2	Mariano Cañardo (ESP)	s.t.
3	Vicente Carretero (ESP)	s.t.
4	Emiliano Álvarez (ESP)	s.t.
5	Antonio Bertola (ITA)	+ 13"
6	Salvador Cardona (ESP)	s.t.
7	Antonio Escuriet (ESP)	s.t.
8	Salvador Molina (ESP)	s.t.
9	Francisco Goenaga (ESP)	s.t.
10	Fermín Trueba (ESP)	s.t.

== Stage 13 ==
21 May 1936 - San Sebastián to Bilbao, 160 km (99 mi)

Stage 13 result

Rank	Rider	Time
1	Vicente Carretero (ESP)	5h 34' 14"
2	Rafael Ramos (ESP)	+ 43"
3	Gustaaf Deloor (BEL)	s.t.
4	Alfons Deloor (BEL)	s.t.
5	Antonio Bertola (ITA)	s.t.
6	Angel Bertola (ITA)	s.t.
7	Antonio Escuriet (ESP)	+ 2' 31"
8	Emiliano Álvarez (ESP)	+ 3' 04"
9	Salvador Molina (ESP)	+ 9' 47"
10	Alphonse Schepers (BEL)	s.t.

General classification after Stage 13

Rank	Rider	Time
1	Gustaaf Deloor (BEL)	96h 46' 40"
2	Antonio Escuriet (ESP)	+ 7' 21"
3	Alfons Deloor (BEL)	+ 12' 30"
4	Antonio Bertola (ITA)	+ 15' 27"
5	Vicente Carretero (ESP)	+ 16' 35"
6	Rafael Ramos (ESP)	+ 21' 54"
7	Julián Berrendero (ESP)	+ 23' 17"
8	Alphonse Schepers (BEL)	+ 42' 50"
9	Emiliano Álvarez (ESP)	+ 45' 07"
10	Fermín Trueba (ESP)	+ 52' 48"

== Stage 14 ==
22 May 1936 - Bilbao to Santander, 199 km (124 mi)

Stage 14 result

Rank	Rider	Time
1	Alfons Deloor (BEL)	7h 29' 40"
2	Emiliano Álvarez (ESP)	s.t.
3	Antonio Bertola (ITA)	+ 18"
4	Salvador Molina (ESP)	s.t.
5	Gustaaf Deloor (BEL)	s.t.
6	Miguel Valero (ESP)	s.t.
7	Joaquin Bailon (ESP)	s.t.
8	Antonio Escuriet (ESP)	s.t.
9	Ramon Cruz (ESP)	+ 22"
10	Julián Berrendero (ESP)	+ 1' 29"

General classification after Stage 14

Rank	Rider	Time
1	Gustaaf Deloor (BEL)	104h 16' 38"
2	Antonio Escuriet (ESP)	+ 11' 01"
3	Alfons Deloor (BEL)	+ 12' 12"
4	Antonio Bertola (ITA)	+ 15' 27"
5	Julián Berrendero (ESP)	+ 24' 28"
6	Rafael Ramos (ESP)	+ 26' 24"
7	Vicente Carretero (ESP)	+ 36' 29"
8	Emiliano Álvarez (ESP)	+ 44' 49"
9	Alphonse Schepers (BEL)	+ 46' 05"
10	Fermín Trueba (ESP)	+ 58' 07"

== Stage 15 ==
24 May 1936 - Santander to Gijón, 194 km (121 mi)

Stage 15 result

Rank	Rider	Time
1	Mariano Cañardo (ESP)	6h 54' 19"
2	Antonio Bertola (ITA)	s.t.
3	Fermín Trueba (ESP)	s.t.
4	Salvador Molina (ESP)	s.t.
5	Alphonse Schepers (BEL)	s.t.
6	Salvador Cardona (ESP)	s.t.
7	Antonio Escuriet (ESP)	s.t.
8	Emiliano Álvarez (ESP)	s.t.
9	Francisco Goenaga (ESP)	s.t.
10	Julián Berrendero (ESP)	s.t.

General classification after Stage 15

Rank	Rider	Time
1	Gustaaf Deloor (BEL)	111h 10' 57"
2	Antonio Escuriet (ESP)	+ 10' 53"
3	Alfons Deloor (BEL)	+ 12' 12"
4	Antonio Bertola (ITA)	+ 15' 27"
5	Julián Berrendero (ESP)	+ 24' 28"
6	Rafael Ramos (ESP)	+ 26' 24"
7	Vicente Carretero (ESP)	+ 26' 29"
8	Emiliano Álvarez (ESP)	+ 34' 59"
9	Alphonse Schepers (BEL)	+ 36' 07"
10	Fermín Trueba (ESP)	+ 58' 07"

== Stage 16 ==
25 May 1936 - Gijón to Ribadeo, 155 km (96 mi)

Stage 16 result

Rank	Rider	Time
1	Rafael Ramos (ESP)	4h 45' 37"
2	Vicente Carretero (ESP)	s.t.
3	Alfons Deloor (BEL)	s.t.
4	Julián Berrendero (ESP)	s.t.
5	Mariano Cañardo (ESP)	s.t.
6	Emiliano Álvarez (ESP)	s.t.
7	Fermín Trueba (ESP)	s.t.
8	Salvador Molina (ESP)	s.t.
9	Francisco Goenaga (ESP)	s.t.
10	Edoardo Molinar (ITA)	+ 3' 59"

General classification after Stage 16

Rank	Rider	Time
1	Gustaaf Deloor (BEL)	115h 56' 34"
2	Antonio Escuriet (ESP)	+ 11' 01"
3	Alfons Deloor (BEL)	+ 12' 12"
4	Antonio Bertola (ITA)	+ 18' 01"
5	Julián Berrendero (ESP)	+ 24' 28"
6	Rafael Ramos (ESP)	+ 26' 24"
7	Vicente Carretero (ESP)	+ 36' 31"
8	Emiliano Álvarez (ESP)	+ 44' 49"
9	Alphonse Schepers (BEL)	+ 49' 28"
10	Fermín Trueba (ESP)	+ 58' 07"

== Stage 17 ==
26 May 1936 - Ribadeo to A Coruña, 157 km (98 mi)

Stage 17 result

Rank	Rider	Time
1	Alphonse Schepers (BEL)	5h 36' 19"
2	Vicente Carretero (ESP)	s.t.
3	Miguel Carrion (ESP)	s.t.
4	Julián Berrendero (ESP)	s.t.
5	Mariano Cañardo (ESP)	s.t.
6	Emiliano Álvarez (ESP)	s.t.
7	Agustin Gonzalez (ESP)	s.t.
8	Francisco Goenaga (ESP)	s.t.
9	Rafael Ramos (ESP)	s.t.
10	Delio Rodríguez (ESP)	s.t.

General classification after Stage 17

Rank	Rider	Time
1	Gustaaf Deloor (BEL)	121h 33' 39"
2	Antonio Escuriet (ESP)	+ 10' 28"
3	Alfons Deloor (BEL)	+ 11' 26"
4	Antonio Bertola (ITA)	+ 17' 15"
5	Julián Berrendero (ESP)	+ 23' 42"
6	Rafael Ramos (ESP)	+ 25' 38"
7	Vicente Carretero (ESP)	+ 35' 33"
8	Emiliano Álvarez (ESP)	+ 44' 16"
9	Alphonse Schepers (BEL)	+ 48' 42"
10	Fermín Trueba (ESP)	s.t.

== Stage 18 ==
27 May 1936 - A Coruña to Vigo, 175 km (109 mi)

Stage 18 result

Rank	Rider	Time
1	Vicente Carretero (ESP)	7h 10' 41"
2	Alphonse Schepers (BEL)	s.t.
3	Antonio Bertola (ITA)	s.t.
4	Mariano Cañardo (ESP)	s.t.
5	Delio Rodríguez (ESP)	s.t.
6	Fermín Trueba (ESP)	s.t.
7	Alfons Deloor (BEL)	s.t.
8	Julián Berrendero (ESP)	s.t.
9	Salvador Cardona (ESP)	s.t.
10	Gustaaf Deloor (BEL)	s.t.

General classification after Stage 18

Rank	Rider	Time
1	Gustaaf Deloor (BEL)	128h 44' 07"
2	Antonio Escuriet (ESP)	+ 10' 41"
3	Alfons Deloor (BEL)	+ 11' 39"
4	Antonio Bertola (ITA)	+ 17' 28"
5	Julián Berrendero (ESP)	+ 23' 55"
6	Rafael Ramos (ESP)	+ 25' 51"
7	Vicente Carretero (ESP)	+ 35' 56"
8	Emiliano Álvarez (ESP)	+ 44' 29"
9	Alphonse Schepers (BEL)	+ 48' 55"
10	Fermín Trueba (ESP)	+ 59' 09"

== Stage 19 ==
29 May 1936 - Vigo to Verín, 178 km (111 mi)

Stage 19 result

Rank	Rider	Time
1	Fermín Trueba (ESP)	6h 58' 51"
2	Alfons Deloor (BEL)	s.t.
3	Julián Berrendero (ESP)	s.t.
4	Francisco Goenaga (ESP)	s.t.
5	Miguel Valero (ESP)	s.t.
6	Mariano Cañardo (ESP)	s.t.
7	Antonio Escuriet (ESP)	s.t.
8	Salvador Molina (ESP)	s.t.
9	Gustaaf Deloor (BEL)	s.t.
10	Emiliano Álvarez (ESP)	s.t.

General classification after Stage 19

Rank	Rider	Time
1	Gustaaf Deloor (BEL)	135h 07' 58"
2	Antonio Escuriet (ESP)	+ 5' 12"
3	Alfons Deloor (BEL)	+ 6' 39"
4	Antonio Bertola (ITA)	+ 13' 23"
5	Julián Berrendero (ESP)	+ 18' 57"
6	Rafael Ramos (ESP)	+ 22' 48"
7	Vicente Carretero (ESP)	+ 31' 51"
8	Emiliano Álvarez (ESP)	+ 39' 29"
9	Alphonse Schepers (BEL)	+ 44' 50"
10	Fermín Trueba (ESP)	+ 54' 09"

== Stage 20 ==
30 May 1936 - Verín to Zamora, 207 km (129 mi)

Stage 20 result

Rank	Rider	Time
1	Antonio Bertola (ITA)	6h 28' 50"
2	Julián Berrendero (ESP)	+ 10"
3	Francisco Goenaga (ESP)	s.t.
4	Alfons Deloor (BEL)	+ 1' 14"
5	Gustaaf Deloor (BEL)	s.t.
6	Alphonse Schepers (BEL)	+ 9' 42"
7		
8	Mariano Cañardo (ESP)	+ 17' 40"
9	Antonio Escuriet (ESP)	+ 17' 45"
10	Luis Esteve (ESP)	+ 17' 50"

General classification after Stage 20

Rank	Rider	Time
1	Gustaaf Deloor (BEL)	141h 33' 02"
2	Alfons Deloor (BEL)	+ 12' 39"
3	Antonio Bertola (ITA)	+ 18' 09"
4	Julián Berrendero (ESP)	+ 23' 51"
5	Antonio Escuriet (ESP)	+ 27' 12"
6	Rafael Ramos (ESP)	+ 47' 47"
7	Alphonse Schepers (BEL)	+ 58' 18"
8	Fermín Trueba (ESP)	+ 1h 07' 37"
9	Emiliano Álvarez (ESP)	+ 1h 09' 03"
10	Mariano Cañardo (ESP)	+ 1h 18' 05"

== Stage 21 ==
31 May 1936 - Zamora to Madrid, 250 km (160 mi)

Stage 21 result

Rank	Rider	Time
1	Emiliano Álvarez (ESP)	8h 31' 36"
2	Julián Berrendero (ESP)	+ 2' 54"
3	Fermín Trueba (ESP)	+ 3' 01"
4	Antonio Bertola (ITA)	s.t.
5	Vicente Carretero (ESP)	+ 3' 16"
6	Mariano Cañardo (ESP)	s.t.
7	Alphonse Schepers (BEL)	
8	Gustaaf Deloor (BEL)	s.t.
9	Francisco Goenaga (ESP)	s.t.
10	Alfons Deloor (BEL)	s.t.

General classification after Stage 21

Rank	Rider	Time
1	Gustaaf Deloor (BEL)	150h 07' 54"
2	Alfons Deloor (BEL)	+ 11' 39"
3	Antonio Bertola (ITA)	+ 18' 04"
4	Julián Berrendero (ESP)	+ 23' 29"
5	Antonio Escuriet (ESP)	+ 28' 54"
6	Rafael Ramos (ESP)	+ 49' 29"
7	Alphonse Schepers (BEL)	+ 58' 18"
8	Emiliano Álvarez (ESP)	+ 1h 05' 47"
9	Fermín Trueba (ESP)	+ 1h 07' 22"
10	Mariano Cañardo (ESP)	+ 1h 18' 05"
