= 1936 Vuelta a España, Stage 1 to Stage 11 =

Long-distance bicycle race stages

The 1936 Vuelta a España was the 2nd edition of Vuelta a España, one of cycling's Grand Tours. The race began in Madrid on 5 May and Stage 11 occurred on 18 May with a stage to Zaragoza. The race finished in Madrid on 31 May.

== Stage 1 ==
5 May 1936 - Madrid to Salamanca, 210 km (130.5 mi)

Stage 1 result and General Classification after Stage 1

Rank	Rider	Time
1	Joseph Huts (BEL)	6h 47' 17"
2	Gustaaf Deloor (BEL)	s.t.
3	Manuel Capella (ESP)	s.t.
4	Manuel Izquierdo (ESP)	s.t.
5	Antonio Bertola (ITA)	s.t.
6	Fermín Trueba (ESP)	s.t.
7	Vicente Carretero (ESP)	s.t.
8	Rafael Ramos (ESP)	s.t.
9	Luigi Barral (ITA)	s.t.
10	Angel Bertola (ITA)	s.t.

== Stage 2 ==
6 May 1936 - Salamanca to Cáceres, 214 km (133.0 mi)

Stage 2 result

Rank	Rider	Time
1	Gustaaf Deloor (BEL)	6h 53' 41"
2	Alfons Deloor (BEL)	+ 4' 36"
3	Antonio Bertola (ITA)	s.t.
4	Antonio Escuriet (ESP)	s.t.
5	Julián Berrendero (ESP)	s.t.
6	Ramon Cruz (ESP)	s.t.
7	Rafael Ramos (ESP)	+ 7' 06"
8	Luigi Barral (ITA)	s.t.
9	Vicente Carretero (ESP)	+ 10' 16"
10	Vicente Trueba (ESP)	s.t.

General classification after Stage 2

Rank	Rider	Time
1	Gustaaf Deloor (BEL)	13h 38' 58"
2	Antonio Bertola (ITA)	+ 6' 36"
3	Julián Berrendero (ESP)	+ 7' 19"
4	Alfons Deloor (BEL)	s.t.
5	Antonio Escuriet (ESP)	s.t.
6	Rafael Ramos (ESP)	+ 9' 06"
7	Luigi Barral (ITA)	s.t.
8	Vicente Trueba (ESP)	+ 12' 16"
9	Vicente Carretero (ESP)	s.t.
10	Mariano Cañardo (ESP)	+ 17' 59"

== Stage 3 ==
7 May 1936 - Cáceres to Sevilla, 270 km (170 mi)

Stage 3 result

Rank	Rider	Time
1	Joseph Huts (BEL)	9h 30' 52"
2	Vicente Carretero (ESP)	s.t.
3	Alphonse Schepers (BEL)	s.t.
4	Bartolomé Flaquer (ESP)	s.t.
5	Fermín Trueba (ESP)	s.t.
6	Antonio Bertola (ITA)	s.t.
7	Luigi Barral (ITA)	s.t.
8	Gustaaf Deloor (BEL)	s.t.
9	Antonio Escuriet (ESP)	s.t.
10	Julián Berrendero (ESP)	s.t.

General classification after Stage 3

Rank	Rider	Time
1	Gustaaf Deloor (BEL)	23h 09' 50"
2	Antonio Bertola (ITA)	+ 6' 36"
3	Julián Berrendero (ESP)	+ 7' 19"
4	Antonio Escuriet (ESP)	s.t.
5	Luigi Barral (ITA)	+ 9' 06"
6	Alfons Deloor (BEL)	+ 10' 41"
7	Vicente Trueba (ESP)	+ 12' 16"
8	Vicente Carretero (ESP)	s.t.
9	Rafael Ramos (ESP)	+ 12' 28"
10	Mariano Cañardo (ESP)	+ 21' 21"

== Stage 4 ==
9 May 1936 - Sevilla to Málaga, 212 km (132 mi)

Stage 4 result

Rank	Rider	Time
1	Gustaaf Deloor (BEL)	7h 07' 26"
2	Luigi Barral (ITA)	s.t.
3	Antonio Escuriet (ESP)	+ 19"
4	Antonio Bertola (ITA)	+ 1' 02"
5	Antonio Andrés Sancho (ESP)	+ 1' 18"
6	Bartolomé Flaquer (ESP)	s.t.
7	Alfons Deloor (BEL)	+ 1' 49"
8	Vicente Carretero (ESP)	s.t.
9	Alphonse Schepers (BEL)	s.t.
10	Cipriano Elys (ESP)	s.t.

General classification after Stage 4

Rank	Rider	Time
1	Gustaaf Deloor (BEL)	30h 17' 16"
2	Antonio Escuriet (ESP)	+ 7' 38"
3	Luigi Barral (ITA)	+ 9' 06"
4	Antonio Bertola (ITA)	+ 10' 38"
5	Julián Berrendero (ESP)	+ 12' 02"
6	Alfons Deloor (BEL)	+ 12' 30"
7	Vicente Carretero (ESP)	+ 14' 05"
8	Rafael Ramos (ESP)	+ 17' 11"
9	Bartolomé Flaquer (ESP)	+ 22' 54"
10	Mariano Cañardo (ESP)	+ 24' 34"

== Stage 5 ==
10 May 1936 - Málaga to Granada, 132 km (82 mi)

Stage 5 result

Rank	Rider	Time
1	Vicente Carretero (ESP)	4h 13' 40"
2	Alphonse Schepers (BEL)	s.t.
3	Rafael Ramos (ESP)	s.t.
4	Gustaaf Deloor (BEL)	s.t.
5	Alfons Deloor (BEL)	s.t.
6	Joaquin Bailon (ESP)	s.t.
7	Antonio Bertola (ITA)	s.t.
8	Julián Berrendero (ESP)	s.t.
9	Antonio Escuriet (ESP)	s.t.
10	Emiliano Álvarez (ESP)	s.t.

General classification after Stage 5

Rank	Rider	Time
1	Gustaaf Deloor (BEL)	34h 30' 56"
2	Antonio Escuriet (ESP)	+ 7' 48"
3	Antonio Bertola (ITA)	+ 10' 38"
4	Julián Berrendero (ESP)	+ 11' 02"
5	Luigi Barral (ITA)	+ 12' 28"
6	Alfons Deloor (BEL)	+ 12' 30"
7	Vicente Carretero (ESP)	+ 14' 05"
8	Rafael Ramos (ESP)	+ 17' 11"
9	Alphonse Schepers (BEL)	+ 30' 43"
10	Fermín Trueba (ESP)	+ 41' 04"

== Stage 6 ==
11 May 1936 - Granada to Almería, 185 km (115 mi)

Stage 6 result

Rank	Rider	Time
1	Gustaaf Deloor (BEL)	6h 28' 39"
2	Vicente Carretero (ESP)	s.t.
3	Fermín Trueba (ESP)	s.t.
4	Mariano Cañardo (ESP)	s.t.
5	Bartolomé Flaquer (ESP)	s.t.
6	Salvador Molina (ESP)	s.t.
7	Salvador Cardona (ESP)	s.t.
8	Antonio Escuriet (ESP)	s.t.
9	Emiliano Álvarez (ESP)	s.t.
10	Francisco Goenaga (ESP)	s.t.

General classification after Stage 6

Rank	Rider	Time
1	Gustaaf Deloor (BEL)	40h 59' 35"
2	Antonio Escuriet (ESP)	+ 7' 38"
3	Antonio Bertola (ITA)	+ 10' 38"
4	Julián Berrendero (ESP)	+ 11' 02"
5	Luigi Barral (ITA)	+ 12' 28"
6	Alfons Deloor (BEL)	
7	Vicente Carretero (ESP)	
8	Rafael Ramos (ESP)	
9	Alphonse Schepers (BEL)	
10	Fermín Trueba (ESP)	

== Stage 7 ==
13 May 1936 - Almería to Alicante, 306 km (190 mi)

Stage 7 result

Rank	Rider	Time
1	Mariano Cañardo (ESP)	10h 31' 43"
2	Gustaaf Deloor (BEL)	+ 1' 05"
3	Vicente Carretero (ESP)	s.t.
4	Alfons Deloor (BEL)	s.t.
5	Alphonse Schepers (BEL)	s.t.
6	Antonio Escuriet (ESP)	s.t.
7	Emiliano Álvarez (ESP)	s.t.
8	Salvador Molina (ESP)	s.t.
9	Francisco Goenaga (ESP)	s.t.
10	Fermín Trueba (ESP)	s.t.

General classification after Stage 7

Rank	Rider	Time
1	Gustaaf Deloor (BEL)	51h 32' 23"
2	Antonio Escuriet (ESP)	+ 7' 38"
3	Antonio Bertola (ITA)	+ 10' 38"
4	Julián Berrendero (ESP)	+ 12' 02"
5	Luigi Barral (ITA)	+ 12' 28"
6	Alfons Deloor (BEL)	+ 12' 30"
7	Vicente Carretero (ESP)	+ 14' 05"
8	Rafael Ramos (ESP)	+ 21' 12"
9	Alphonse Schepers (BEL)	+ 30' 43"
10	Fermín Trueba (ESP)	+ 41' 04"

== Stage 8 ==
14 May 1936 - Alicante to Valencia, 184 km (114 mi)

Stage 8 result

Rank	Rider	Time
1	Antonio Bertola (ITA)	6h 15' 59"
2	Vicente Carretero (ESP)	+ 31"
3	Mariano Cañardo (ESP)	+ 45"
4	Bernardo De Castro (ESP)	+ 1' 01"
5	Rafael Ramos (ESP)	s.t.
6	Julián Berrendero (ESP)	s.t.
7	José Arias (ESP)	s.t.
8	Salvador Cardona (ESP)	s.t.
9	Antonio Escuriet (ESP)	s.t.
10	Emiliano Álvarez (ESP)	s.t.

General classification after Stage 8

Rank	Rider	Time
1	Gustaaf Deloor (BEL)	57h 49' 23"
2	Antonio Escuriet (ESP)	+ 7' 38"
3	Antonio Bertola (ITA)	+ 8' 36"
4	Julián Berrendero (ESP)	+ 8' 38"
5	Alfons Deloor (BEL)	+ 12' 00"
6	Vicente Carretero (ESP)	+ 13' 30"
7	Rafael Ramos (ESP)	+ 21' 12"
8	Alphonse Schepers (BEL)	+ 30' 43"
9	Fermín Trueba (ESP)	+ 41' 04"
10	Emiliano Álvarez (ESP)	+ 41' 11"

== Stage 9 ==
15 May 1936 - Valencia to Tarragona, 279 km (173 mi)

Stage 9 result

Rank	Rider	Time
1	Salvador Cardona (ESP)	9h 59' 30"
2	Vicente Carretero (ESP)	+ 1' 23"
3	Gustaaf Deloor (BEL)	s.t.
4	Emiliano Álvarez (ESP)	s.t.
5	Bernardo De Castro (ESP)	s.t.
6	Benito Cabestreros (ESP)	s.t.
7	Julián Berrendero (ESP)	s.t.
8	Rafael Ramos (ESP)	s.t.
9	Miguel Valero (ESP)	s.t.
10	Gregorio Idigoras (ESP)	s.t.

General classification after Stage 9

Rank	Rider	Time
1	Gustaaf Deloor (BEL)	67h 50' 16"
2	Antonio Escuriet (ESP)	+ 7' 38"
3	Antonio Bertola (ITA)	+ 9' 37"
4	Julián Berrendero (ESP)	+ 12' 02"
5	Alfons Deloor (BEL)	+ 12' 30"
6	Vicente Carretero (ESP)	+ 13' 35"
7	Rafael Ramos (ESP)	+ 21' 02"
8	Alphonse Schepers (BEL)	+ 33' 03"
9	Fermín Trueba (ESP)	+ 41' 04"
10	Emiliano Álvarez (ESP)	+ 41' 11"

== Stage 10 ==
17 May 1936 - Tarragona to Barcelona, 129 km (80 mi)

Stage 10 result

Rank	Rider	Time
1	Vicente Carretero (ESP)	4h 13' 47"
2	Gustaaf Deloor (BEL)	s.t.
3	Mariano Cañardo (ESP)	s.t.
4	Alphonse Schepers (BEL)	s.t.
5	José Arias (ESP)	+ 13"
6	Salvador Molina (ESP)	s.t.
7	Fermín Trueba (ESP)	s.t.
8	Julián Berrendero (ESP)	s.t.
9	Cipriano Elys (ESP)	s.t.
10	Joaquin Bailon (ESP)	s.t.

General classification after Stage 10

Rank	Rider	Time
1	Gustaaf Deloor (BEL)	72h 09' 03"
2	Antonio Escuriet (ESP)	+ 8' 30"
3	Julián Berrendero (ESP)	+ 12' 02"
4	Alfons Deloor (BEL)	+ 12' 30"
5	Antonio Bertola (ITA)	+ 13' 27"
6	Vicente Carretero (ESP)	+ 13' 35"
7	Rafael Ramos (ESP)	+ 21' 54"
8	Alphonse Schepers (BEL)	+ 33' 03"
9	Fermín Trueba (ESP)	+ 41' 04"
10	Emiliano Álvarez (ESP)	+ 42' 03"

== Stage 11 ==
18 May 1936 - Barcelona to Zaragoza, 293 km (182 mi)
