= 1932 Volta a Catalunya =

Race details
- Dates: 4–11 September 1932
- Stages: 7
- Distance: 1,190 km (740 mi)
- Winning time: 40h 53' 14"

Results
	Winner	Mariano Cañardo (ESP)
	Second	Domenico Piemontesi (ITA)
	Third	Isidre Figueras (ESP)

The 1932 Volta a Catalunya was the 14th edition of the Volta a Catalunya cycle race and was held from 4 September to 11 September 1932. The race started and finished in Barcelona. The race was won by Mariano Cañardo.

== Route and stages ==
List of stages
Stage	Date	Course	Distance	Winner
1	4 September	Barcelona to Reus	149 km (93 mi)	Louis Hardiquest (BEL)
2	5 September	Reus to Tortosa	142 km (88 mi)	Antoine Dignef (BEL)
3	6 September	Tortosa to Cervera	200 km (124 mi)	Domenico Piemontesi (ITA)
4	7 September	Cervera to La Seu d'Urgell	145 km (90 mi)	Ettore Meini (ITA)
	8 September	La Seu d'Urgell		Rest day
5	9 September	La Seu d'Urgell to Girona	231 km (144 mi)	Domenico Piemontesi (ITA)
6	10 September	Girona to Manresa	209 km (130 mi)	Salvador Cardona (ESP)
7	11 September	Manresa to Barcelona	110 km (68 mi)	Antoine Dignef (BEL)
	Total		1,186 km (737 mi)	

== General classification ==
Final general classification

Rank	Rider	Time
1	Mariano Cañardo (ESP)	40h 53' 14"
2	Domenico Piemontesi (ITA)	+ 4' 02"
3	Isidre Figueras (ESP)	+ 16' 15"
4	Antoine Dignef (BEL)	+ 20' 09"
5	Aristide Cavallini (ITA)	+ 30' 07"
6	Marcel Maurel (FRA)	+ 35' 30"
7	Allegro Grandi (ITA)	+ 39' 10"
8	Juan Mateu Ribé (ESP)	+ 51' 10"
9	Ricardo Montero (ESP)	+ 54' 20"
10	Salvador Cardona (ESP)	+ 59' 21"
