= 1935 UCI Road World Championships – Men's road race =

Men's Individual Road Race
1935 UCI Road World Championships
- Rainbow jersey

Race details
- Dates: 18 August 1935
- Stages: 1
- Distance: 216 km (134.2 mi)
- Winning time: 6h 05' 19"

Results
	Winner	Jean Aerts (BEL)	(Belgium)
	Second	Luciano Montero (ESP)	(Spain)
	Third	Gustave Danneels (BEL)	(Belgium)

The men's road race at the 1935 UCI Road World Championships was the ninth edition of the event. The race took place on Sunday 18 August 1935 in Floreffe, Belgium. The race was won by Jean Aerts of Belgium.

== Final classification ==
General classification (1–10)

Rank	Rider	Time
1st place, gold medalist(s)	Jean Aerts (BEL)	6h 05' 19"
2nd place, silver medalist(s)	Luciano Montero (ESP)	+ 2' 57"
3rd place, bronze medalist(s)	Gustave Danneels (BEL)	+ 9' 08"
4	Aldo Bini (ITA)	+ 11' 03"
5	Leo Amberg (SUI)	+ 11' 08"
6	Arsène Mersch (LUX)	+ 11' 08"
7	Mathias Clemens (LUX)	+ 11' 08"
8	Hubert Opperman (AUS)	+ 11' 08"
9	Erich Bautz (GER)	+ 19' 41"
10	Emil Kijewski (GER)	+ 19' 41"
