= 1930 Tour of the Basque Country =

Race details
- Dates: 18–21 August 1930
- Stages: 4
- Distance: 723 km (449 mi)
- Winning time: 26h 36' 31"

Results
| | Winner | Mariano Cañardo (ESP) |
| | Second | Antonin Magne (FRA) |
| | Third | Jean Aerts (BEL) |

The 1930 Tour of the Basque Country was the seventh edition of the Tour of the Basque Country cycle race and was held from 18 August to 21 August 1930. The race started in Bilbao and finished in Las Arenas. The race was won by Mariano Cañardo. The race was not held again until 1935.

== General classification ==
Final general classification

| Rank | Rider | Time |
|---|---|---|
| 1 | Mariano Cañardo (ESP) | 26h 36' 31" |
| 2 | Antonin Magne (FRA) | + 50" |
| 3 | Jean Aerts (BEL) | + 14' 26" |
| 4 | Fédérico Ezquerra (ESP) | + 15' 54" |
| 5 | Pierre Magne (FRA) | + 16' 35" |
| 6 | Julien Moineau (FRA) | + 17' 21" |
| 7 | Hector Martin (BEL) | + 20' 36" |
| 8 | Eusebio Bastida (ESP) | + 20' 54" |
| 9 | Luciano Montero (ESP) | + 25' 17" |
| 10 | Juan Antonio Golzarri (ESP) | + 30' 36" |
