= 1932 Tour of Flanders =

Race details
- Dates: 13 March 1932
- Stages: 1
- Distance: 227 km (141.1 mi)
- Winning time: 6h 29' 00"

Results
	Winner	Romain Gijssels (BEL)
	Second	Alfons Deloor (BEL)
	Third	Alfred Hamerlinck (BEL)

The 16th edition of the Tour of Flanders cycling classic race was held on Sunday, 13 March 1932. Belgian Romain Gijssels won the Monument for a second time. Of the 120 starting cyclists, 44 reached the finish.

== Route ==
The race started in Ghent and covered 227 km on the way to the finish in Wetteren.

The course featured 3 categorized climbs:

- Kwaremont
- Kruisberg
- Edelareberg

== Race report ==
Last year's winner Romain Gijssels had strong opposition from Jef Demuysere, Georges Ronsse and Frans Bonduel. Although, on the cobblestones of the Flemish hills, he was clearly the better and he won the Tour for the second time in a row. He completed the race with an average of 35.012 km/h.

== General classification ==
=== Final general classification ===
Rank	Rider	Team	Time
1	Romain Gijssels (BEL)	Dilecta–Wolber	6h 29' 00"
2	Alfons Deloor (BEL)	Daemers	3'15"
3	Alfred Hamerlinck (BEL)	Dilecta–Wolber	4'30"
4	Jean Aerts (BEL)	Alcyon–Dunlop	s.t.
5	Félicien Vervaecke (BEL)	Labor	s.t.
6	Jan-Jozef Horemans (BEL)	Dilecta–Wolber	s.t.
7	Cesar Bogaert (NED)	Demol	5'30"
8	Frans Bonduel (BEL)	Dilecta–Wolber	s.t.
9	Léon Tommies (BEL)	Alcyon–Dunlop	s.t.
10	Léopold Roosemont (BEL)	Alcyon–Dunlop	s.t.
