= 1935 Vuelta a España =

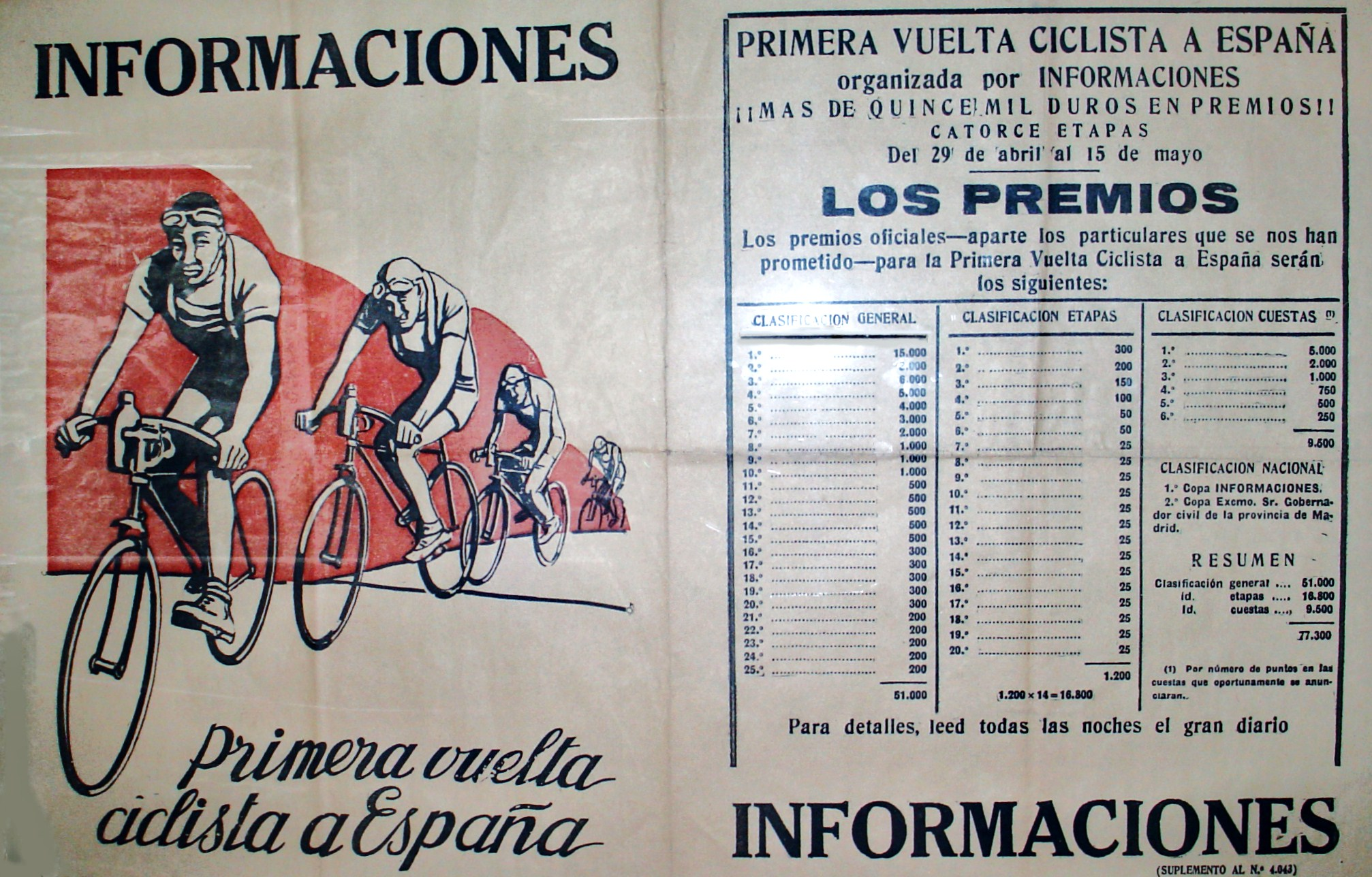
- Spanish Newspaper "Informaciones" (1935) with the prize list of the first "Vuelta a España". Museu de Joguet de Verdú (Lleida, Catalunya, Spain).

Race details
- Dates: 29 April – 15 May
- Stages: 14
- Distance: 3,425 km (2,128 mi)
- Winning time: 120h 00' 07"

Results
Jersey awarded to the overall winner	Winner	Gustaaf Deloor (BEL)	(B.H.)
	Second	Mariano Cañardo (ESP)	(Orbea)
	Third	Antoine Dignef (BEL)	(B.H.)
	Mountains	Edoardo Molinar (ITA)	

The 1st edition of Vuelta a España took place from 29 April to 15 May 1935, and consisted of 14 stages and 3,425 km (2,128 mi), the winning average speed was 28.54 km/h (17.73 mph). The Vuelta began and ended in Madrid, Spain.

The field consisted of 50 riders including 33 Spanish riders; 29 finished the race. The weather conditions (rainy and cold) were said to have been to the advantage of the Belgian riders. Belgian Gustaaf Deloor took the leader's jersey with nine minutes advantage on the third stage. Deloor was challenged by Mariano Cañardo. However, on the thirteenth stage, Canardo crashed and lost five minutes. On the final stage, Deloor displayed panache to attack and win the stage and the General classification into Madrid.

== Participants ==
There were two teams entering the Vuelta: B.H. and Orbea. The other participants, mostly Spanish, entered individually.

== Final standings ==
=== Stage results ===
Stage characteristics and results
Stage	Date	Course	Distance	Type	Winner
1	29 April	Madrid to Valladolid	185 km (115 mi)	Stage with mountain(s)	Antoine Dignef (BEL)
2	30 April	Valladolid to Santander	251 km (156 mi)	Stage with mountain(s)	Antonio Escuriet (ESP)
	1 May	Rest day			
3	2 May	Santander to Bilbao	199 km (124 mi)	Stage with mountain(s)	Gustaaf Deloor (BEL)
4	3 May	Bilbao to San Sebastián	235 km (146 mi)	Stage with mountain(s)	Antoine Dignef (BEL)
5	4 May	San Sebastián to Zaragoza	264 km (164 mi)	Stage with mountain(s)	Mariano Cañardo (ESP)
6	5 May	Zaragoza to Barcelona	310 km (193 mi)	Plain stage	François Adam (BEL)
	6 May	Rest day			
7	7 May	Barcelona to Tortosa	188 km (117 mi)	Plain stage	Antonio Montes (ESP)
8	8 May	Tortosa to Valencia	188 km (117 mi)	Plain stage	Max Bulla (AUT)
9	9 May	Valencia to Murcia	265 km (165 mi)	Plain stage	Salvador Cardona (ESP)
10	10 May	Murcia to Granada	285 km (177 mi)	Plain stage	Max Bulla (AUT)
11	11 May	Granada to Sevilla	260 km (162 mi)	Plain stage	Gustaaf Deloor (BEL)
	12 May	Rest day			
12	13 May	Sevilla to Cáceres	270 km (168 mi)	Stage with mountain(s)	François Adam (BEL)
13	14 May	Cáceres to Zamora	275 km (171 mi)	Stage with mountain(s)	Edoardo Molinar (ITA)
14	15 May	Zamora to Madrid	250 km (155 mi)	Stage with mountain(s)	Gustaaf Deloor (BEL)

=== General classification ===
There were 29 cyclists who had completed all fourteen stages. For these cyclists, the times they had needed in each stage was added up for the general classification. The cyclist with the least accumulated time was the winner.

Final general classification (1–10)
Rank	Name	Team	Time
1	Gustaaf Deloor (BEL)	B.H.	120h 00' 07"
2	Mariano Cañardo (ESP)	Orbea	+ 13' 28"
3	Antoine Dignef (BEL)	B.H.	+ 20' 10"
4	Max Bulla (AUT)	Orbea	+ 28' 51"
5	Edoardo Molinar (ITA)	Orbea	+ 29' 49"
6	Alfons Deloor (BEL)	B.H.	+ 47' 27"
7	Paolo Bianchi (ITA)	Orbea	+ 51' 51"
8	Fernand Fayolle (FRA)	Orbea	+ 52' 58"
9	Walter Blattmann (SUI)	Orbea	+ 1h 09' 02"
10	Marinus Valentijn (NED)	B.H.	+ 1h 09' 46"

=== Mountains classification ===
Final mountains classification (1–10)
Rank	Name	Team	Points
1	Edoardo Molinar (ITA)	Orbea	68
2	Luigi Barral (ITA)	Orbea	68
3	Leo Amberg (SUI)	Orbea	51
4	Antoine Dignef (BEL)	B.H.	41
5	François Adam (BEL)	B.H.	41
6	Salvador Molina (ESP)	Orbea	39
7	Mariano Cañardo (ESP)	Orbea	33
8	Gustaaf Deloor (BEL)	B.H.	30
9	Fermín Trueba (ESP)	B.H.	29
10	Vicente Trueba (ESP)	B.H.	25
