= 1933 Tour of Flanders =

Race details
- Dates: 2 April 1933
- Stages: 1
- Distance: 227 km (141.1 mi)
- Winning time: 6h 51' 00"

Results
	Winner	Alfons Schepers (BEL)
	Second	Léon Tommies (BEL)
	Third	Romain Gijssels (BEL)

The 17th edition of the Tour of Flanders cycling classic race was held on Sunday, 2 April 1933. Belgian Alfons Schepers won the Monument. Of the 164 starting cyclists, 43 reached the finish.

== Route ==
The race started in Ghent and covered 227 km on the way to the finish in Wetteren.

The course featured 3 categorized climbs:

- Kwaremont
- Kruisberg
- Edelareberg

== Race report ==
Alfons Schepers won the bunch sprint in Wetteren. He completed the race with an average of 33.138 km/h.

== General classification ==
=== Final general classification ===
Rank	Rider	Team	Time
1	Alfons Schepers (BEL)	La Française-Dunlop	6h 51' 00"
2	Léon Tommies (BEL)	Alcyon–Dunlop	s.t.
3	Romain Gijssels (BEL)	Dilecta–Wolber	s.t.
4	Alfons Deloor (BEL)	Dilecta–Wolber	s.t.
5	Joseph Lambert (BEL)	Dilecta–Wolber	s.t.
6	Léon Louyet (BEL)	Genial Lucifer-Hutchinson	s.t.
7	Emiel Decroix (BEL)	Cycles Depas	s.t.
8	Georges Lemaire (BEL)	Cycles Depas	s.t.
9	Jozef-Hubert Horemans (BEL)	Dilecta–Wolber	s.t.
10	Sylvère Maes (BEL)	Alcyon–Dunlop	s.t.
