= 1929 Volta a Catalunya =

Race details
- Dates: 8–15 September 1929
- Stages: 7
- Distance: 1,111 km (690.3 mi)
- Winning time: 40h 01' 44"

Results
	Winner	Mariano Cañardo (ESP)
	Second	Jean Aerts (BEL)
	Third	Ardito Bresciani (ITA)

The 1929 Volta a Catalunya was the 11th edition of the Volta a Catalunya cycle race and was held from 8 September to 15 September 1929. The race started and finished in Barcelona. The race was won by Mariano Cañardo.

== Route and stages ==
List of stages
Stage	Date	Course	Distance	Winner
1	8 September	Barcelona to Reus	141 km (88 mi)	Jean Aerts (BEL)
2	9 September	Reus to La Sénia	124 km (77 mi)	José María Sans (ESP)
3	10 September	La Sénia to Tàrrega	214 km (133 mi)	Jean Aerts (BEL)
4	11 September	Tàrrega to Puigcerdà	164 km (102 mi)	Jean Aerts (BEL)
	12 September	Puigcerdà		Rest day
5	13 September	Puigcerdà to Palafrugell	197 km (122 mi)	Jean Aerts (BEL)
6	14 September	Palafrugell to Gironella	172 km (107 mi)	Mariano Cañardo (ESP)
7	15 September	Gironella to Barcelona	105 km (65 mi)	Jean Aerts (BEL)
	Total		1,117 km (694 mi)	

== General classification ==
Final general classification

Rank	Rider	Time
1	Mariano Cañardo (ESP)	40h 01' 44"
2	Jean Aerts (BEL)	+ 1' 51"
3	Ardito Bresciani (ITA)	+ 8' 33"
4	Juan Mateu Ribé (ESP)	+ 16' 01"
5	Vicente Trueba (ESP)	+ 17' 57"
6	José María Sans (ESP)	+ 27' 25"
7	Adrien Buttafocchi (FRA)	+ 30' 26"
8	Lazare Venot (FRA)	+ 31' 30"
9	José María Figueras (ESP)	+ 37' 47"
10	Joseph Mauclair (FRA)	+ 40' 24"
