= 1936 Paris–Nice =

Race details
- Dates: 17–22 March 1936
- Stages: 7
- Distance: 1,220 km (758.1 mi)
- Winning time: 36h 26' 41"

Results
	Winner	Maurice Archambaud (FRA)
	Second	Jean Fontenay (FRA)
	Third	Alfons Deloor (BEL)

The 1936 Paris–Nice was the fourth edition of the Paris–Nice cycle race and was held from 17 March to 22 March 1936. The race started in Paris and finished in Nice. The race was won by Maurice Archambaud.

== General classification ==
Final general classification

Rank	Rider	Time
1	Maurice Archambaud (FRA)	36h 26' 41"
2	Jean Fontenay (FRA)	+ 3' 11"
3	Alfons Deloor (BEL)	+ 10' 26"
4	Marcel Kint (BEL)	+ 10' 45"
5	Félicien Vervaecke (BEL)	+ 14' 01"
6	Raoul Lesueur (FRA)	+ 16' 11"
7	Paul Egli (SUI)	+ 17' 44"
8	Gustaaf Deloor (BEL)	+ 24' 01"
9	Antoine Dignef (BEL)	+ 25' 28"
10	François Gardier (BEL)	+ 27' 28"
