= 1938 Liège–Bastogne–Liège =

Race details
- Dates: 15 May 1938
- Stages: 1
- Distance: 211 km (131 mi)
- Winning time: 5h 41' 41"

Results
	Winner	Alfons Deloor (BEL)
	Second	Marcel Kint (BEL)
	Third	Félicien Vervaecke (BEL)

The 1938 Liège–Bastogne–Liège was the 28th edition of the Liège–Bastogne–Liège cycle race and was held on 11 May 1938. The race started and finished in Liège. The race was won by Alfons Deloor.

== General classification ==
Final general classification

Rank	Rider	Time
1	Alfons Deloor (BEL)	5h 41' 41"
2	Marcel Kint (BEL)	+ 0"
3	Félicien Vervaecke (BEL)	+ 0"
4	François Dedonder (BEL)	+ 0"
5	Sylvère Maes (BEL)	+ 0"
6	Jérôme Dufromont (BEL)	+ 0"
7	Louis Janssens (BEL)	+ 0"
7	Edward Vissers (BEL)	+ 0"
7	Louis Hardiquest (BEL)	+ 0"
7	Frans Demondt (BEL)	+ 0"
