= Roberto Lozano =

Spanish cyclist

Personal information
- Full name: Roberto Lozano Montero
- Born: 4 June 1977 (age 49) Òdena, Spain

Cycling career
- Sport: Cycling
- Current team: Retired
- Discipline: Road
- Role: Rider

Professional team
- 2001–2003: Kelme–Costa Blanca

Roberto Lozano Montero (born 4 June 1977) is a Spanish former professional road cyclist.

== Major results ==
2003
1st Circuito de Getxo
2004
Volta a Tarragona

1st Points classification
1st Stages 3 & 4

2nd Overall Tour of Japan

1st Stages 3 & 5
