= 1933 Paris–Roubaix =

Cycling race

Race details
- Dates: 16 April 1933
- Stages: 1
- Distance: 255 km (158.4 mi)
- Winning time: 5h 59' 00"

Results
	Winner	Sylvère Maes (BEL)
	Second	Julien Vervaecke (BEL)
	Third	Léon Le Calvez (FRA)

The 1933 Paris–Roubaix was the 34th edition of the Paris–Roubaix, a classic one-day cycle race in France. The single day event was held on 16 April 1933 and stretched 255 km (158 mi) from Paris to its end in a velodrome in Roubaix. The winner was Sylvère Maes from Belgium.

== Results ==
Final results (1–10)
Rank	Cyclist	Time
1	Sylvère Maes (BEL)	5h 59' 00″
2	Julien Vervaecke (BEL)	+0' 00″
3	Léon Le Calvez (FRA)	+1' 48″
4	Ludwig Geyer (GER)	+1' 48″
5	Maurice Archambaud (FRA)	+1' 48″
6	Alfons Deloor (BEL)	+1' 58″
7	Gaston Rebry (BEL)	+1' 58″
8	Charles Pélissier (FRA)	+1' 58″
9	Emile Decroix (BEL)	+3' 43″
10	René Bernard (FRA)	+4' 16″
