= 1936 Vuelta a España =

Race details
- Dates: 5–31 May
- Stages: 21
- Distance: 4,354 km (2,705 mi)
- Winning time: 150h 07' 54"

Results
Jersey awarded to the overall winner	Winner	Gustaaf Deloor (BEL)
	Second	Alfons Deloor (BEL)
	Third	Antonio Bertola (ITA)
	Mountains	Salvador Molina (ESP)

The 1936 Vuelta a España was the 2nd Vuelta a España.This cycling race took place from 5 May to 31 May 1936. The race was composed of 21 stages over 4,354 km (2,705 mi) and was ridden at an average of 29 km/h (18 mph). The second edition of the Vuelta began under a volatile political and social situation and several weeks after the race was over, Spain was plunged into its civil war. The race was anticipated to see a battle between the previous winner Belgian Gustaaf Deloor and the second-place finisher of 1935 Spaniard Mariano Canardo. However a crash during the early stages of the race ruled Canardo out of the runnings. While Deloor led the race from the second stage to the finish, his brother Alfons climbed up the classification and when second placed Spaniard Antonio Escuriet suffered exhaustion on the penultimate day, Alfons rode himself into the second place overall. Fifty riders began the race and only twenty four finished the race in Madrid on 31 May. Afterward the Vuelta was suspended during the civil war where riders such as Julian Berrendero had to do military service and were also imprisoned during the war.

The leader of the general classification wore an orange jersey, while the last-placed cyclist wore a red garment. The Spanish other cyclists wore grey jerseys, and the other foreign cyclists wore green jerseys.

== Route and stages ==
Stage characteristics and results
Stage	Date	Course	Distance	Type	Winner
1	5 May	Madrid to Salamanca	210 km (130 mi)		Joseph Huts (BEL)
2	6 May	Salamanca to Cáceres	214 km (133 mi)		Gustaaf Deloor (BEL)
3	7 May	Cáceres to Sevilla	270 km (168 mi)		Vicente Carretero (ESP)
4	9 May	Sevilla to Málaga	212 km (132 mi)		Gustaaf Deloor (BEL)
5	10 May	Málaga to Granada	132 km (82 mi)		Vicente Carretero (ESP)
6	11 May	Granada to Almería	185 km (115 mi)		Gustaaf Deloor (BEL)
7	13 May	Almería to Alicante	306 km (190 mi)		Mariano Cañardo (ESP)
8	14 May	Alicante to Valencia	184 km (114 mi)		Antonio Bertola (ITA)
9	15 May	Valencia to Tarragona	279 km (173 mi)		Salvador Cardona (ESP)
10	17 May	Tarragona to Barcelona	129 km (80 mi)		Vicente Carretero (ESP)
11	18 May	Barcelona to Zaragoza	293 km (182 mi)		Alfons Schepers (BEL)
12	19 May	Zaragoza to San Sebastián	265 km (165 mi)		Alfons Schepers (BEL)
13	21 May	San Sebastián to Bilbao	160 km (99 mi)		Vicente Carretero (ESP)
14	22 May	Bilbao to Santander	199 km (124 mi)		Alfons Deloor (BEL)
15	24 May	Santander to Gijón	194 km (121 mi)		Mariano Cañardo (ESP)
16	25 May	Gijón to Ribadeo	155 km (96 mi)		Rafael Ramos (ESP)
17	26 May	Ribadeo to A Coruña	157 km (98 mi)		Alfons Schepers (BEL)
18	27 May	A Coruña to Vigo	175 km (109 mi)		Vicente Carretero (ESP)
19	29 May	Vigo to Verín	178 km (111 mi)		Fermin Trueba (ESP)
20	30 May	Verín to Zamora	207 km (129 mi)		Antonio Bertola (ITA)
21	31 May	Zamora to Madrid	250 km (155 mi)		Emiliano Álvarez (ESP)

== Classification leadership ==
Classification leadership by stage
Stage	Winner	General classification	Mountains classification	Team classification
1	Joseph Huts	Joseph Huts	Luigi Barral	
2	Gustaaf Deloor	Gustaaf Deloor	Luigi Barral	
3	Vicente Carretero	Gustaaf Deloor	Luigi Barral	
4	Gustaaf Deloor	Gustaaf Deloor	Luigi Barral	
5	Vicente Carretero	Gustaaf Deloor	Fermín Trueba	
6	Gustaaf Deloor	Gustaaf Deloor	Fermín Trueba	
7	Mariano Cañardo	Gustaaf Deloor	Fermín Trueba	
8	Antonio Bertola	Gustaaf Deloor	Fermín Trueba	
9	Salvador Cardona	Gustaaf Deloor	Fermín Trueba	
10	Vicente Carretero	Gustaaf Deloor	Fermín Trueba	
11	Alfons Schepers	Gustaaf Deloor	Fermín Trueba	
12	Alfons Schepers	Gustaaf Deloor	Fermín Trueba	
13	Vicente Carretero	Gustaaf Deloor	Fermín Trueba	
14	Alfons Deloor	Gustaaf Deloor	Salvador Molina	
15	Mariano Cañardo	Gustaaf Deloor	Salvador Molina	
16	Rafael Ramos	Gustaaf Deloor	Salvador Molina	
17	Alfons Schepers	Gustaaf Deloor	Salvador Molina	
18	Vicente Carretero	Gustaaf Deloor	Salvador Molina	
19	Fermin Trueba	Gustaaf Deloor	Salvador Molina	
20	Antonio Bertola	Gustaaf Deloor	Salvador Molina	
21	Emiliano Álvarez	Gustaaf Deloor	Salvador Molina	Belgium
Final		Gustaaf Deloor	Salvador Molina	Belgium

== Final standings ==
=== General classification ===
There were 26 cyclists who had completed all twenty-one stages. For these cyclists, the times they had needed in each stage was added up for the general classification. The cyclist with the least accumulated time was the winner.

Final general classification (1–10)
Rank	Name	Team	Time
1	Gustaaf Deloor (BEL)		150h 07' 54"
2	Alfons Deloor (BEL)		+ 11' 39"
3	Antonio Bertola (ITA)		+ 17' 54"
4	Julian Berrendero (ESP)		+ 23' 39"
5	Antonio Escuriet (ESP)		+ 28' 54"
6	Rafael Ramos (ESP)		+ 49' 29"
7	Alfons Schepers (BEL)		+ 58' 18"
8	Emiliano Álvarez (ESP)		+ 1h 05' 47"
9	Fermin Trueba (ESP)		+ 1h 07' 22"
10	Mariano Cañardo (ESP)		+ 1h 18' 05"

=== Mountains classification ===
Final mountains classification (1–10)
Rank	Name	Team	Points
1	Salvador Molina (ESP)		78
2	Julian Berrendero (ESP)		72
3	Antonio Bertola (ITA)		63
4	Antoine Dignef (BEL)		47
5	Francisco Goenaga (ESP)		40
6	Gustaaf Deloor (BEL)		38.5
7	Vicente Carretero (ESP)		35
8	Emiliano Álvarez (ESP)		28
9	Rafael Ramos (ESP)		20
10	Alfons Deloor (BEL)		19
