= 1934 Liège–Bastogne–Liège =

Race details
- Dates: 13 May 1934
- Stages: 1
- Distance: 213 km (132 mi)
- Winning time: 6h 01' 30"

Results
	Winner	Théo Herckenrath (BEL)
	Second	Mathieu Cardynaels (BEL)
	Third	Joseph Moerenhout (BEL)

The 1934 Liège–Bastogne–Liège was the 24th edition of the Liège–Bastogne–Liège cycle race and was held on 13 May 1934. The race started and finished in Liège. The race was won by Théo Herckenrath.

== General classification ==
Final general classification

Rank	Rider	Time
1	Théo Herckenrath (BEL)	6h 01' 30"
2	Mathieu Cardynaels (BEL)	+ 0"
3	Joseph Moerenhout (BEL)	+ 0"
4	François Gardier (BEL)	+ 0"
5	François Adam (BEL)	+ 0"
6	Joseph Vanderhaegen (BEL)	+ 3' 35"
7	Jan-Jozef Horemans (BEL)	+ 3' 35"
8	Charles Mathieu (BEL)	+ 3' 35"
9	Antoine Dignef (BEL)	+ 3' 35"
10	Camille Schallier (BEL)	+ 3' 38"
