= 1935 Paris–Nice =

Race details
- Dates: 26–31 March 1935
- Stages: 6
- Distance: 1,308 km (812.8 mi)
- Winning time: 35h 23' 14"

Results
	Winner	René Vietto (FRA)
	Second	Antoine Dignef (BEL)
	Third	Raoul Lesueur (FRA)

The 1935 Paris–Nice was the third edition of the Paris–Nice cycle race and was held from 26 March to 31 March 1935. The race started in Paris and finished in Nice. The race was won by René Vietto.

== General classification ==
Final general classification

Rank	Rider	Time
1	René Vietto (FRA)	35h 23' 14"
2	Antoine Dignef (BEL)	+ 1' 17"
3	Raoul Lesueur (FRA)	+ 3' 27"
4	Léon Level (FRA)	+ 7' 33"
5	Adrien Buttafocchi (FRA)	+ 10' 17"
6	René Le Grevès (FRA)	+ 11' 11"
7	Georges Speicher (FRA)	+ 14' 34"
8	Pierre Magne (FRA)	+ 15' 06"
9	Jean Fontenay (FRA)	+ 18' 42"
10	Alfons Deloor (BEL)	+ 23' 00"
