= Jean Aerts =

Belgian cyclist (1907–1992)

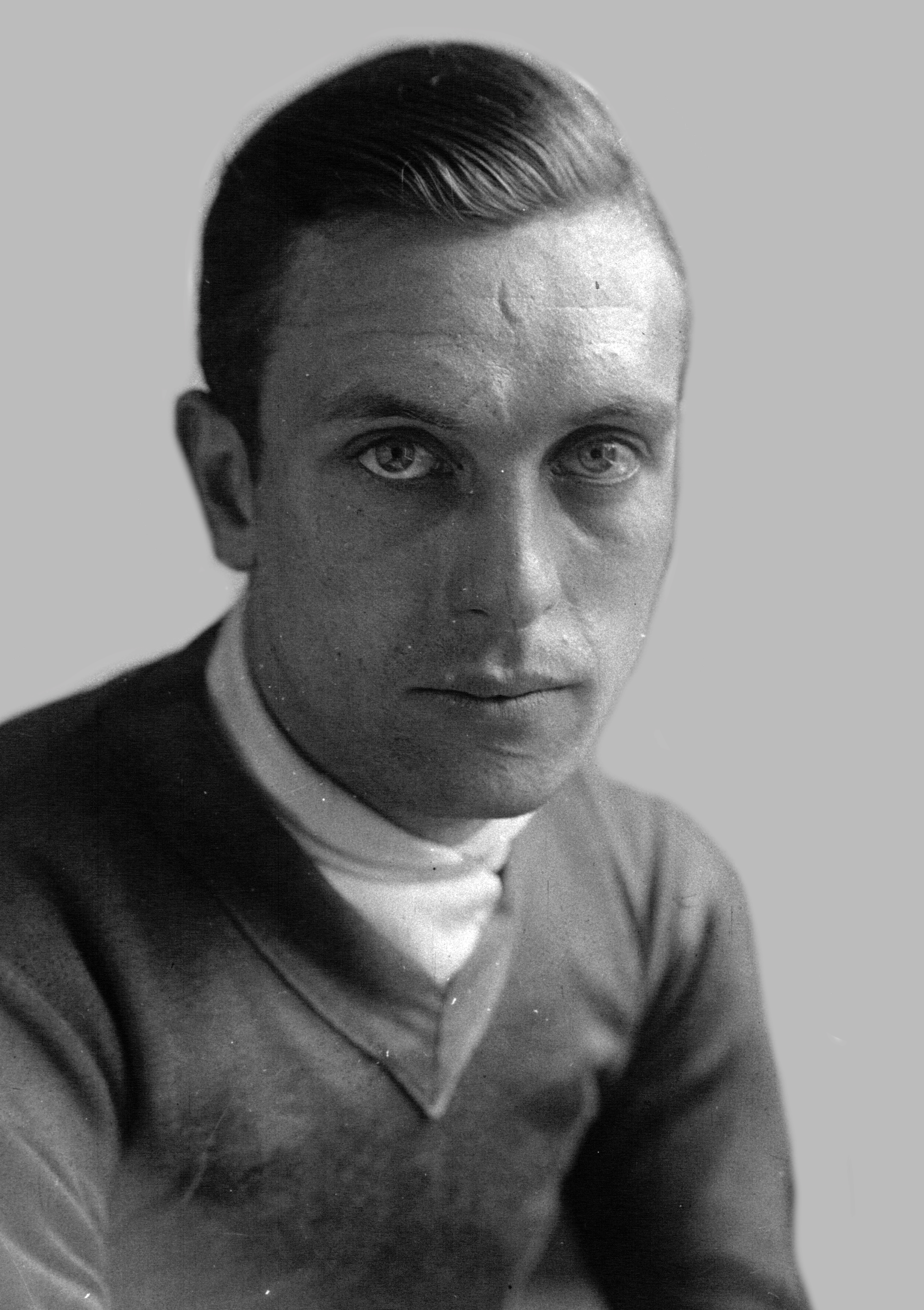
- Aerts during the 1929 Tour de France

Personal information
- Full name: Jean Aerts
- Born: 8 September 1907 Laken, Belgium
- Died: 15 June 1992 (aged 84) Bruges, Belgium

Cycling career
- Sport: Cycling
- Discipline: Road
- Role: Rider

Professional teams
- 1929: Elvish-Fontan
- 1930: Fontan-Wolber
- 1931–1939: Alcyon
- 1940–1943: individual

Major wins
- Grand Tours Tour de France 12 individual stages (1930, 1932, 1933, 1935) One-day races and Classics World Road Race Championships (1935) Paris-Brussels (1931)
Medal record
Representing Belgium
Men's road bicycle racing
World Championships
Gold medal – first place	1935 Floreffe	Elite Men's Road Race
Gold medal – first place	1927 Nürburgring	Amateur's Road Race
Bronze medal – third place	1928 Budapest	Amateur's Road Race

Jean Aerts (8 September 1907 – 15 June 1992) was a Belgian road bicycle racer who specialized as a sprinter. Aerts became the first man to win both the world amateur (1927) and professional (1935) road race championships. In 1935, Aerts captured first place and the gold medal at the professional UCI Road World Championships in Floreffe, Belgium.

In 1927 professional and amateur riders rode concurrently at the Nürburgring in Germany and Aerts finished 5th, the highest ranked amateur. He also competed in three events at the 1928 Summer Olympics.

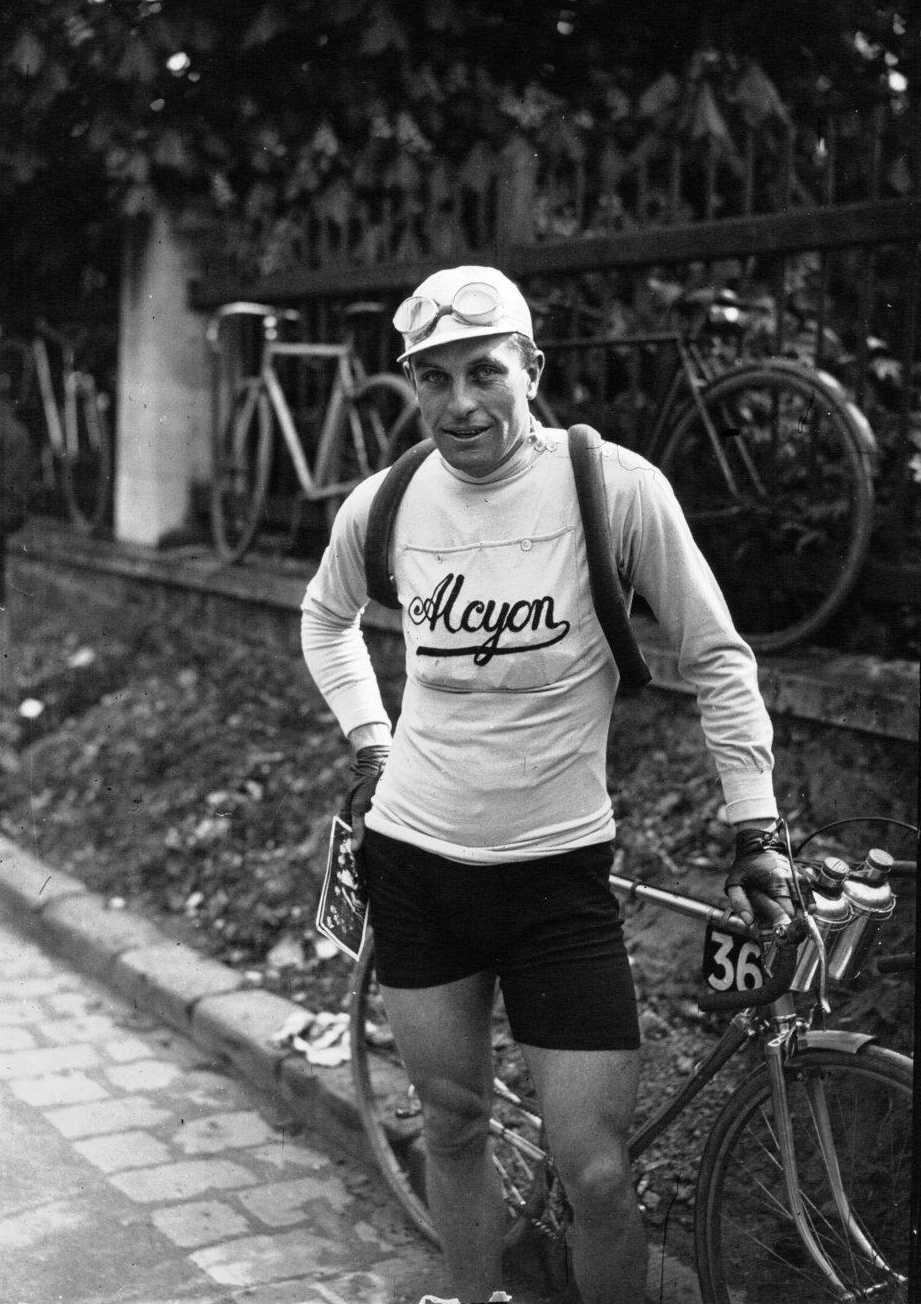
Aerts during 1934 Paris-Tours

Although he lacked climbing ability for major tours, he used his sprinting ability to win 11 stages of the Tour de France, including six in 1933.

== Major results ==
=== Amateur ===
1926
2nd National Road Championships, Amateur Road Race
1927
UCI Road World Championships

1st Amateur Road Race
5th Men's Road Race

1st National Road Championships, Amateur Road Race
1st La Haye-Bruxelles
1st GP Egg-Tiberghien
1928
1st National Road Championships, Amateur Road Race
3rd UCI Road World Championships, Amateur Road Race

=== Professional ===
1929
2nd Overall Volta a Catalunya

Winner stages 1, 3, 4, 5 and 7

1st Tour du Sud-Ouest
1st Villeneuve sur Lot
1st Circuit de la Chalosse
6th Paris–Roubaix
7th Paris–Tours
1930
Tour de France:

Winner stage 6

1st GP du Marthonnais
2nd GP de la Tribune Républicaine
3rd Overall Tour of the Basque Country
6th Paris–Roubaix
7th Paris–Tours
8th Paris–Brussels
8th GP Wolber
1931
1st Paris–Brussels
1st Circuit du Midi
1st Wanze
3rd Tour of Flanders
1932
Tour de France

13th place Overall classification
Winner stage 1

1st Prix Goullet-Fogler (with Omer De Bruycker)
1st Grand Critérium d'Europe
2nd Paris-Belfort
2nd Circuit du Morbihan
4th Paris–Roubaix
4th Tour of Flanders
5th Paris–Brussels
1933
Tour of Belgium:

Overall winner
Winner stages 2, 3 and 5

Tour de France

9th place Overall classification
Winner stages 4, 15, 17, 19, 20 and 21

1 stage Paris–Nice
1934
1 stage Tour de Suisse
1st Paris - Boulogne-sur-Mer
1st Critérium de Bâle
1935
1st Road race, UCI World Championships
Tour de France

Winner stages 4, 8, 10 and 19
29th place overall classification

1st Paris - Vichy
1st Zürich Criterium
3rd Paris–Roubaix
1936
1st National Road Championships, Road Race
1st Critérium de Pau
1937
1st London Criterium

=== Track ===
1936
1st Brussels (Derny)
2nd Six Days of London (with Albert Buysse)
3rd Six Days of Brussels (with Adolf Schön)
1937
1st Six Days of Brussels (with Omer De Bruycker)
1st Six Days of Paris (with Omer De Bruycker)
1941
1st National Championships Stayers
1942
1st National Championships Stayers
1943
3rd National Championships Stayers
