= 1932 Paris–Roubaix =

Cycling race

Race details
- Dates: 27 March 1932
- Stages: 1
- Distance: 255 km (158.4 mi)
- Winning time: 6h 49' 58"

Results
	Winner	Romain Gijssels (BEL)
	Second	Georges Ronsse (BEL)
	Third	Herbert Sieronski (GER)

The 1932 Paris–Roubaix was the 33rd edition of the Paris–Roubaix, a classic one-day cycle race in France. The single day event was held on 27 March 1932 and stretched 255 km (158 mi) from Paris to its end in a velodrome in Roubaix. The winner was Romain Gijssels from Belgium.

== Results ==
Final results (1–10)
Rank	Cyclist	Time
1	Romain Gijssels (BEL)	6h 49' 58″
2	Georges Ronsse (BEL)	+0' 00″
3	Herbert Sieronski (GER)	+0' 00″
4	Jean Aerts (BEL)	+0' 00″
5	Alfons Schepers (BEL)	+0' 32″
6	Jef Demuysere (BEL)	+1' 15″
7	Alfons Ghisquière (BEL)	+1' 47″
8	Emile Decroix (BEL)	+1' 49″
9	Julien Vervaecke (BEL)	+2' 00″
10	Alfons Deloor (BEL)	+2' 00″
