= 1935 UCI Road World Championships =

- Venue: Floreffe, Belgium
- Date: 18 August 1935
- Coordinates: 50°26′N 04°47′E
- Events: 2

The 1935 UCI Road World Championships was the fifteenth edition of the UCI Road World Championships.

The championship took place in Floreffe, Belgium on Sunday 18 August 1935.

The amateurs had to complete twelve laps on the 13.5 kilometer course. There were 38 participants. The professionals started with 39 riders. They had to complete sixteen laps, 216 kilometers in total.

In the same period, the 1935 UCI Track Cycling World Championships was organized in the Heysel Stadium in Brussels.

== Events Summary ==
Event	Gold		Silver		Bronze	
Men's Events
Professional Road Race	Jean Aerts; Belgium	6h 5' 19"; Media 37,994 km/h	Luciano Montero; Spain	+ 2' 59"	Gustave Danneels; Belgium	+ 9' 08"
Amateur Road Race	Ivo Mancini; Italy	-	Robert Charpentier; France	-	Werner Grundahl Hansen; Denmark	-
