= Gemuño =

- Municipality
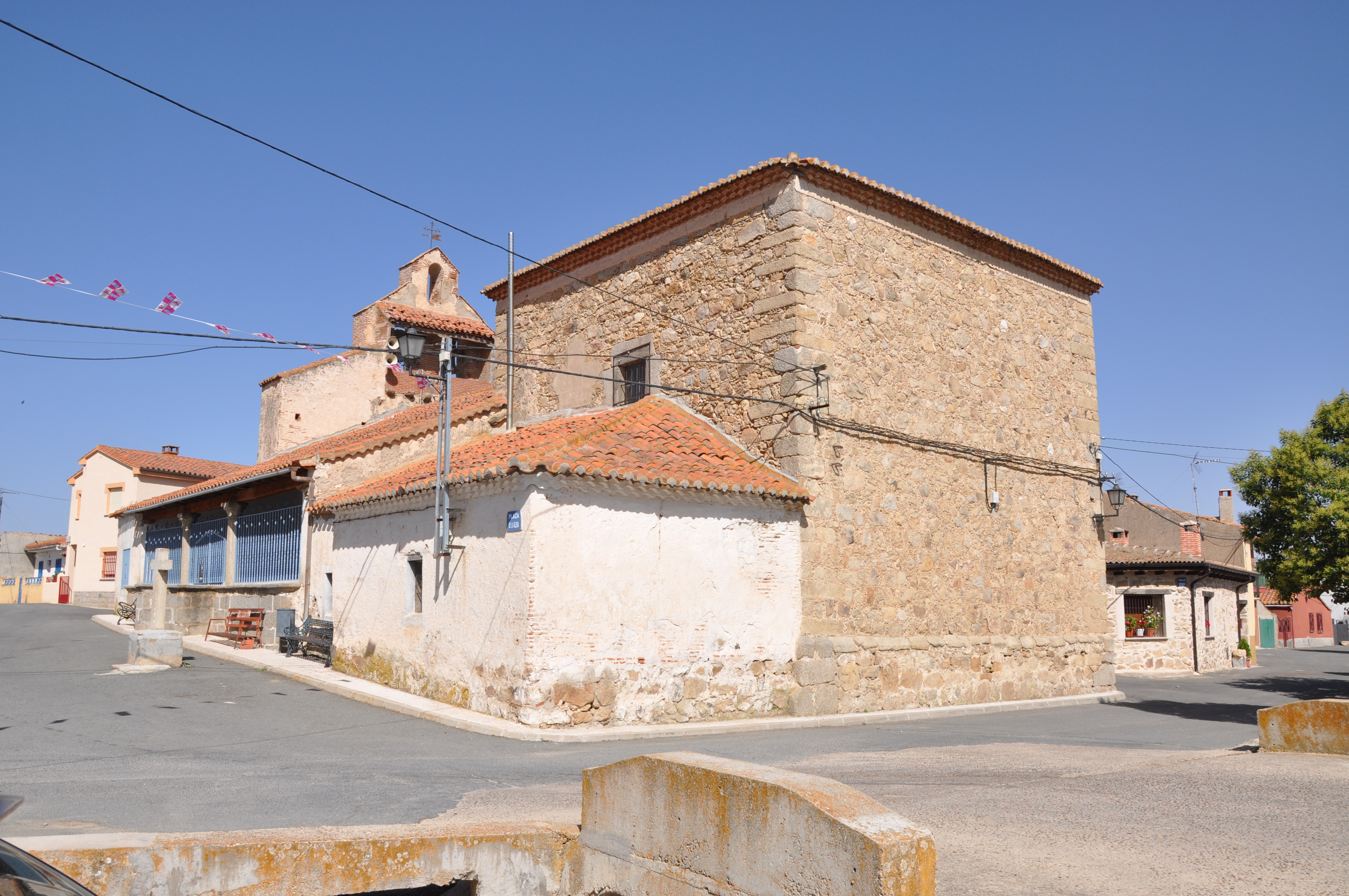
- Parish Church of St. Mary Magdalene, Gemuño

- Location in Spain. Gemuño (Spain)
- Coordinates: 40°35′35″N 4°46′56″W
- Country: Spain
- Autonomous community: Castile and León
- Province: Ávila
- Municipality: Gemuño

Area
  - Total: 17 km^{2} (6.6 sq mi)

Population (2025-01-01)
  - Total: 147
  - Density: 8.6/km^{2} (22/sq mi)
- Time zone: UTC+1 (CET)
  - Summer (DST): UTC+2 (CEST)
- Website: Official website

Gemuño (Spanish pronunciation: [xeˈmuɲo]) is a municipality located in the province of Ávila, Castile and León, Spain.

== Population ==
Historical population
Year	Pop.	±% p.a.
2023	150	—
2024	142	−5.33%
2025	147	+3.52%
Source: INE
