= Circuito de Getxo =

Spanish road bicycle race

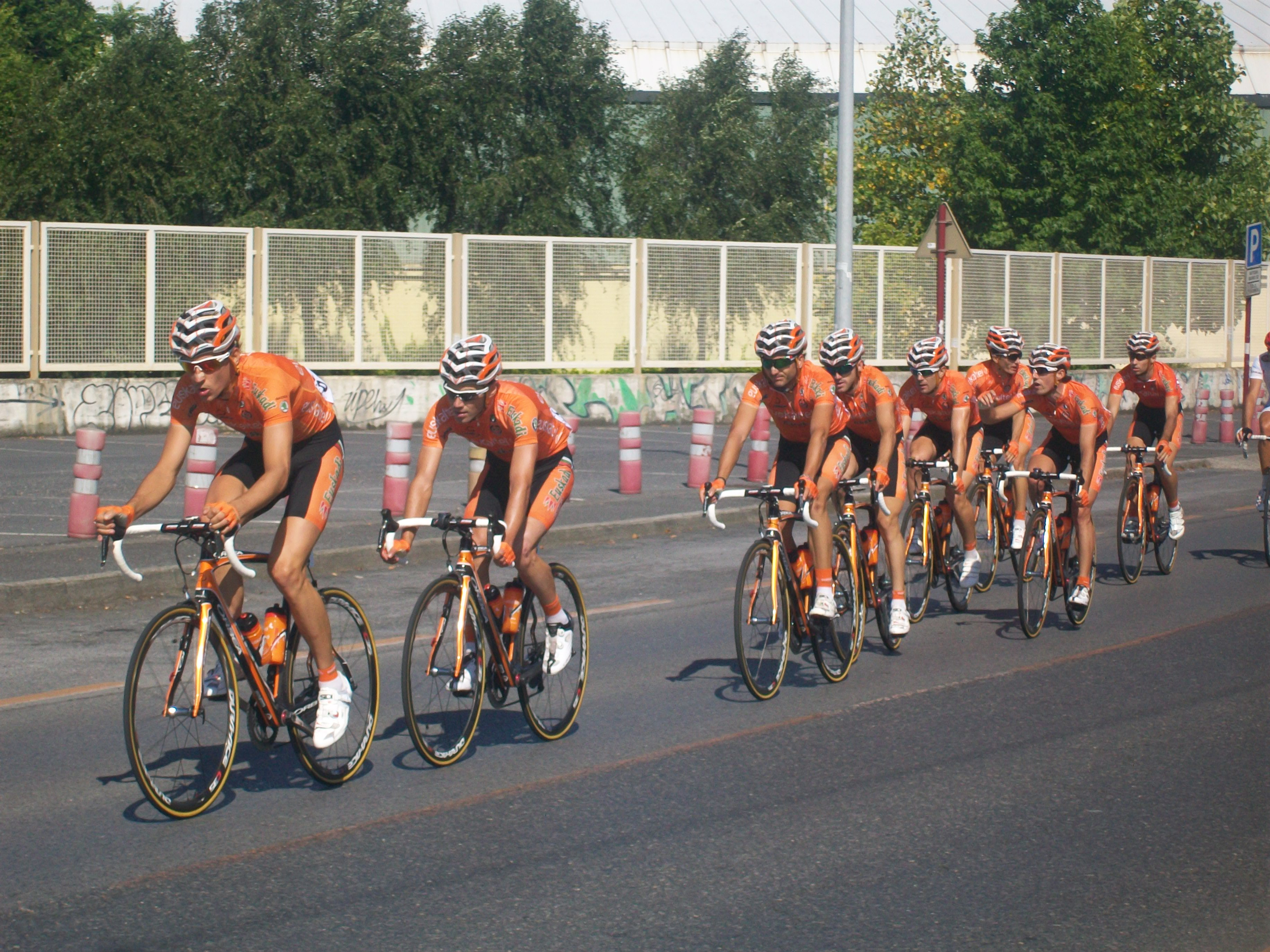

Race details
- Date: Late-July
- Region: Basque Country, Spain
- English name: Circuito de Getxo
- Local name(s): Circuito de Getxo de ciclismo – Memorial Ricardo Otxoa (in Spanish), Getxoko txirrindularitza zirkuitua – Ricardo Otxoa Memoriala
- Discipline: Road race
- Competition: UCI Europe Tour
- Type: Single-day
- Web site: www.circuitodegetxo.com

History
- First edition: 1924
- Editions: 81 (as of 2026)
- First winner: Domingo Gutierrez (ESP)
- Most wins: Fédérico Ezquerra (ESP) (3 wins)
- Most recent: Natnael Tesfatsion (ERI)

The Circuito de Getxo (English: Getxo Circuit) is a single-day road bicycle race held annually in July in Getxo, Spain. Since 2005, the race is organised as a 1.1 event on the UCI Europe Tour.

Established in 1924 as Circuito de Getxo, since 2001 it is also held as Memorial Ricardo Otxoa in memory of former cyclist Ricardo Otxoa, who died after a car hit him and his twin brother, Javier in early 2001.

== Winners ==
Year	Country	Rider	Team
1924	Spain	Domingo Gutiérrez	A.C. Bilbao
1925	Spain	Francisco Cepeda	Sopuertas Sport
1926	Spain	Segundo Barruetabeña	Arenas Club
1927	Spain	Dioscoro Alonso	C.D. Ibarrea
1928	Spain	Manuel López	Real Madrid
1929	Spain	Francisco Cepeda	Dilecta–Wolber
1930	Spain	Mariano Cañardo	Styl
1929– 1933	No race		
1934	Spain	José Urdangarin	Real Unión Irun
1935	Spain	Fédérico Ezquerra	Orbea
1936– 1939	No race		
1940	Spain	Fédérico Ezquerra	individual
1941	Spain	Julián Berrendero	individual
1942	Spain	Fédérico Ezquerra	individual
1943	Spain	Martín Mancisidor	U.D. Sans
1944	Spain	Julián Berrendero	individual
1945	Spain	Cipriano Aguirrezabal	individual
1946	Spain	Cipriano Aguirrezabal	individual
1947	Spain	Miguel Gual	U.D. Sans–Alas Color–Minaco
1948	Spain	Juan Jáuregui	individual
1949	Spain	Jesús Loroño	individual
1950	Spain	Jesús Morales	individual
1951	Spain	Óscar Elguezabal	individual
1952	Spain	Óscar Elguezabal	individual
1953	Spain	Hortensio Vidaurreta	individual
1954	Spain	Antonio Barrutia	Gamma
1955	Spain	Cosme Barrutia	Gamma
1956	Spain	Antonio Ferraz	Minaco–Peugeot
1957	Spain	Hortensio Vidaurreta	Real Unión Irun–Palmera
1958	Spain	Fausto Iza	Boxing Club–KAS
1959	Spain	Roberto Morales	Kas
1960	Spain	Jacinto Urrestarazu	Garsa
1961	Spain	Antonio Barrutia	Catigene
1962	Spain	Roberto Morales	Kas
1963	Spain	Manuel Martín	Kas–Kaskol
1964	Spain	Sebastián Elorza	Kas–Kaskol
1965	Spain	Antonio Gómez del Moral	Kas–Kaskol
1966	Spain	Antonio Gómez del Moral	Kas–Kaskol
1967– 1979	No race		
1980	Spain	Felipe Yáñez	Kelme
1981	Spain	Marino Lejarreta	Teka
1982	Spain	Juan-Carlos Alonso	Teka
1983	Spain	Carlos Hernández	Reynolds
1984	Spain	Jesús Guzmán	Dormilon
1985	Spain	Antonio Esparza	Kelme
1986	No race		
1987	Spain	Federico Echave	B.H. Sport
1988	Spain	José Luis Villanueva	KAS–Canal 10
1989	Netherlands	John Talen	Panasonic – Isostar
1990	Spain	Víctor Gonzalo	Banesto
1991	Netherlands	Adri van der Poel	Tulip Computers
1992	Netherlands	Mathieu Hermans	Lotus–Festina
1993	No race		
1994	Portugal	Orlando Rodrigues	Artiach–Nabisco
1995	Finland	Miika Hietanen	Cédico–Sunjets–Ville de Charleroi
1996	Spain	Arsenio González	Mapei – GB
1997	Great Britain	Jeremy Hunt	Banesto
1998	Germany	Marcel Wüst	Festina–Lotus
1999	Denmark	Jesper Skibby	Home–Jack & Jones
2000	Spain	César Garcia Calvo	Colchon Relax–Fuenlabrada
2001	Italy	Alessandro Bertolini	Alessio
2002	Switzerland	Martin Elmiger	Phonak Hearing Systems
2003	Spain	Roberto Lozano	Kelme–Costa Blanca
2004	Belgium	Gert Vanderaerden	MrBookmaker.com–Palmans
2005	Spain	David Fernández	Andalucía–Paul Versan
2006	Spain	Mikel Gaztañaga	Atom
2007	Spain	Vicente Reynès	Caisse d'Epargne
2008	Netherlands	Reinier Honig	P3 Transfer–Batavus
2009	Spain	Koldo Fernández	Euskaltel–Euskadi
2010	Spain	Francisco José Pacheco	Xacobeo–Galicia
2011	Spain	Juan José Lobato	Andalucía–Caja Granada
2012	Italy	Giovanni Visconti	Movistar Team
2013	Spain	Juan José Lobato	Euskaltel–Euskadi
2014	Spain	Carlos Barbero	Euskadi
2015	France	Nacer Bouhanni	Cofidis
2016	Italy	Diego Ulissi	Lampre–Merida
2017	Spain	Carlos Barbero	Movistar Team
2018	Spain	Alex Aranburu	Caja Rural–Seguros RGA
2019	Spain	Jon Aberasturi	Caja Rural–Seguros RGA
2020	Italy	Damiano Caruso	Bahrain–McLaren
2021	Italy	Giacomo Nizzolo	Team Qhubeka NextHash
2022	Spain	Juan Ayuso	UAE Team Emirates
2023	Kazakhstan	Alexey Lutsenko	Astana Qazaqstan Team
2024	Spain	Jon Barrenetxea	Movistar Team
2025	Mexico	Isaac del Toro	UAE Team Emirates XRG
2026	Eritrea	Natnael Tesfatsion	Movistar Team
