= Luciano Montero =

Spanish cyclist (1908–1993)

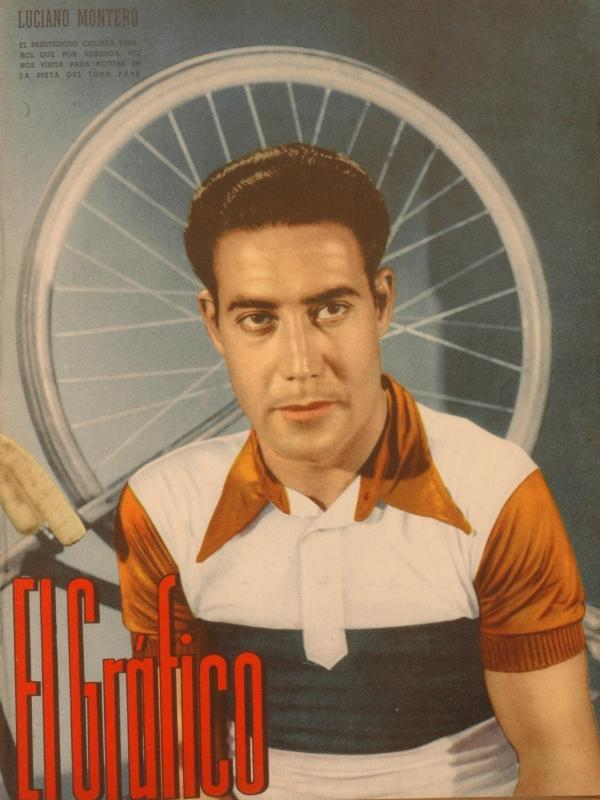
- Luciano Montero in 1940

Personal information
- Full name: Luciano Montero Hernández
- Born: 20 April 1908 Gemuño, Spain
- Died: 1 August 1993 (aged 85) Buenos Aires, Argentina

Cycling career
- Sport: Cycling
- Discipline: Road
- Role: Rider

Professional teams
- 1926–1934: Real Unión de Irún
- 1928–1929: Dilecta–Wolber
- 1930–1931: Styl
- 1932–1933: Orbea
- 1934–1935: BH
- 1936: Colin–Wolber
Medal record
Representing Spain
Men's road bicycle racing
World Championships
| Silver medal – second place | 1935 Floreffe | Elite Men's Road Race |

Luciano Montero Hernández (20 April 1908 – 1 August 1993) was a Spanish professional road bicycle racer. He is most known for his silver medal in the Elite race of the 1935 UCI Road World Championships.

== Major results ==
1926
1st Trophée France-Sport
1927
1st GP Pascuas
1928
1st GP Pascuas
4th Overall Tour de la Sud-Ouest

1st Stage 1

1929
1st National Road Race Championships
1st GP UVE
1930
1st GP de la Bicicleta Eibarresa
1st Vuelta a Alava
1st Trofeo Olimpia
2nd National Road Race Championships
9th Overall Tour of the Basque Country
1931
1st Prueba Loinaz
3rd Prueba Legazpia
1932
1st National Road Race Championships
1st GP República
1st GP Valladolid
1933
1st GP de l'Echo d'Alger
1st GP República
1st Prueba Legazpia
1st Stage 4 Volta a Galicia
2nd National Road Race Championships
7th Grand Prix des Nations
1934
1st National Road Race Championships
1st GP Vizcaya
1st GP República
3rd Grand Prix des Nations
1935
2nd (silver) Road race, World Road Championships
3rd National Road Race Championships
3rd Grand Prix des Nations
1936
2nd National Road Race Championships
3rd Grand Prix des Nations
10th Road race, World Road Championships
1938
1st Bordeaux-Angoulème
1943
11th Rosario - Santa Fe
