= Romain Gijssels =

Belgian cyclist

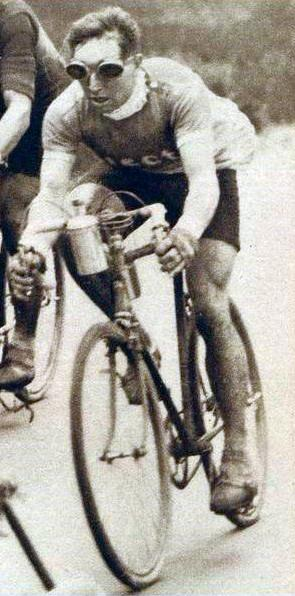

Personal information
- Full name: Romain Gijssels
- Born: 10 March 1907 Belgium
- Died: 31 March 1978 (aged 71)

Cycling career
- Sport: Cycling
- Discipline: Road
- Role: Rider

Professional teams
- 1930–1934: Dilecta
- 1935: Dilecta and JB Louvet
- 1936: Dilecta

Major wins
- Tour of Flanders (2x); Paris–Roubaix

Romain Gijssels (Denderwindeke, 10 March 1907 – Paris, 31 March 1978) was a Belgian professional road bicycle racer between 1930 and 1936.

In 1932, Gijssels won both the Tour of Flanders and Paris–Roubaix in the same season, which (up to 2024) has only been accomplished by eleven riders.

== Major achievements ==
1931
Tour of Flanders
Grand Prix Wolber
2nd, Bordeaux–Paris
3rd, Paris–Brussels
1932
Tour of Flanders
Paris–Roubaix
Bordeaux–Paris
1933
Marseille-Lyon
St Niklaas
2nd, Critérium des As
3rd, Tour of Flanders
3rd, Bordeaux–Paris
1934
Paris-Belfort
2nd, Paris–Tours
32nd, Tour de France
1935
3rd, Critérium des As
