= Sébastien Piccardo =

French cyclist

Personal information
- Born: 22 January 1905
- Died: 26 July 1983 (aged 78)

Cycling career
- Sport: Cycling
- Discipline: Road
- Role: Rider

Sébastien Piccardo (22 January 1905 – 26 July 1983) was a French racing cyclist. He rode in the 1928 Tour de France.
