= Karl Thallinger =

Austrian cyclist

Personal information
- Born: 29 August 1909

Cycling career
- Sport: Cycling
- Discipline: Road
- Role: Rider

Karl Thallinger (born 29 August 1909, date of death unknown) was an Austrian racing cyclist. He rode in the 1933 Tour de France.
