= Emiliano Álvarez =

Spanish cyclist (1912–1987)

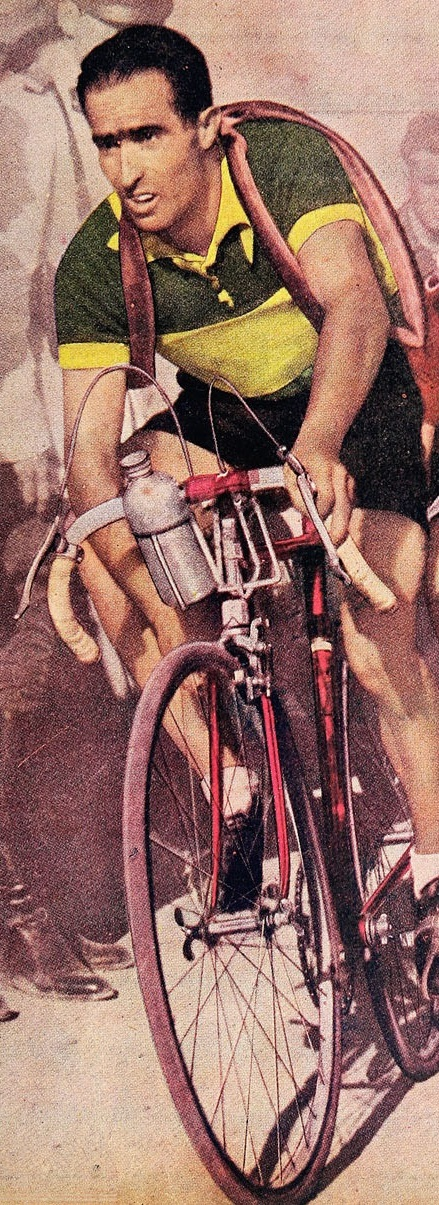

Personal information
- Full name: Emiliano Álvarez Arana
- Born: 25 October 1912 Errenteria, Spain
- Died: 1 June 1987 (aged 74) Viña del Mar, Chile

Cycling career
- Sport: Cycling
- Current team: Retired
- Discipline: Road
- Role: Rider

Professional team
- 1937: Peugeot-Dunlop

Major wins
- 1 stage 1936 Vuelta a España

Emiliano Álvarez Arana (25 October 1912 — 1 June 1987) was a Spanish cyclist. He was professional from 1932 to 1939. He was born in Errenteria.

== Major results ==
1932
1st stage 5 Volta a la Comunitat Valenciana
1933
2nd Volta a la Comunitat Valenciana

1st stage 5

1934
1st Bordeaux-Angoulême
1st Prueba Villafranca de Ordizia
1st Barcelona-Jaca
1st Vuelta a Irun
1935
3rd Bordeaux-Angoulême
1st Vuelta al Valle de Léniz
1936
1st stage 21 Vuelta a España
1st Grand Prix de la Bicicleta Eibarresa
1938
3rd Tour de Corrèze
1939
1st Circuit des cols Pyrenean

1st stage 2
