= Salvador Molina =

Spanish cyclist (1914–1982)

Personal information
- Full name: Salvador Molina Andrea
- Born: 17 June 1914 Castelló, Valencia, Spain
- Died: 20 March 1982 (aged 67)
- Height: 1.65 m (5 ft 5 in)
- Weight: 62 kg (137 lb)

Cycling career
- Sport: Cycling
- Discipline: Road
- Role: Rider

Professional team
- 1935: Orbea

Salvador Molina Andrea (17 June 1914 – 20 March 1982) was a Spanish racing cyclist. Professional from 1935 to 1944, Carretero won the mountains classification of the 1936 Vuelta a España.

== Major results ==
1935
2nd Prueba Villafranca de Ordizia
3rd Circuit de Getxo
4th Clásica a los Puertos
1936
1st Mountains classification, Vuelta a España
1942
1st Stage 2 Vuelta a Levante
1st Stage 6 Circuito del Norte
