= Walter Blattmann (cyclist) =

Swiss cyclist (1910–1965)

Personal information
- Born: 10 June 1910 Zürich, Switzerland
- Died: 1 October 1965 (aged 55) Zürich, Switzerland

Cycling career
- Sport: Cycling
- Discipline: Road
- Role: Rider

Professional teams
- 1932–1933: Colin–Wolber
- 1938: Adler

Walter Blattmann (10 June 1910 – 1 October 1965) was a Swiss racing cyclist. He rode in the 1933 Tour de France and finished 9th overall in the 1935 Vuelta a España. He also won the 1933 Züri-Metzgete.

== Major results ==
1933
1st National Cyclo-cross Championships
1st Züri-Metzgete
2nd Overall Circuit de la Haute-Savoie
9th Overall Tour de Suisse
1934
1st Tour du Nord-Ouest
1st Tour du Lac Léman
1935
9th Overall Vuelta a España
1936
4th Overall Tour de Suisse
1937
3rd Overall Tour de Suisse
