= Rafael Ramos (cyclist) =

Spanish cyclist (1911–1985)

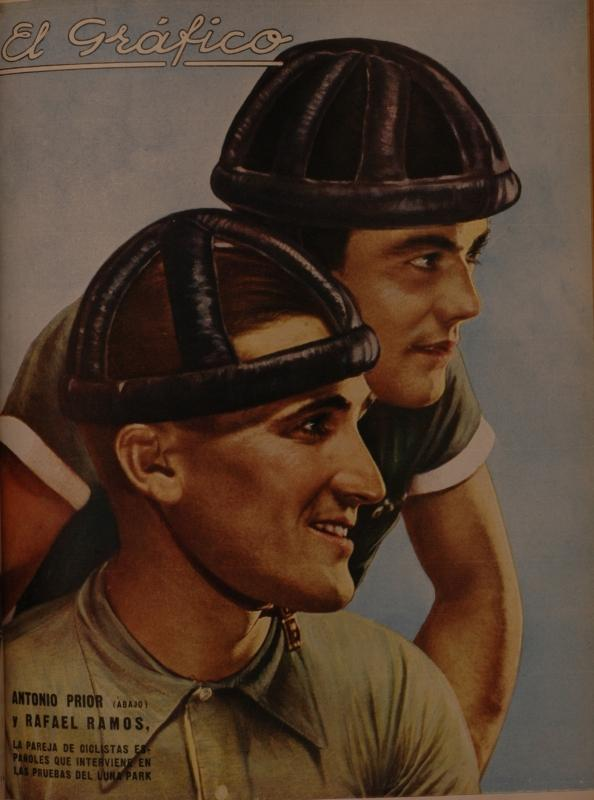
- Painting of Rafael Ramos in 1936

Personal information
- Born: 29 October 1911 Nerva, Spain
- Died: 2 September 1985 (aged 73) Carcassonne, France
- Height: 1.62 m (5 ft 4 in)
- Weight: 64 kg (141 lb)

Cycling career
- Sport: Cycling
- Discipline: Road
- Role: Rider

Rafael Ramos (29 October 1911 – 2 September 1985) was a Spanish racing cyclist. He rode in the 1937 Tour de France and won stage 16 of the 1936 Vuelta a España.
