= Marinus Valentijn =

Dutch cyclist

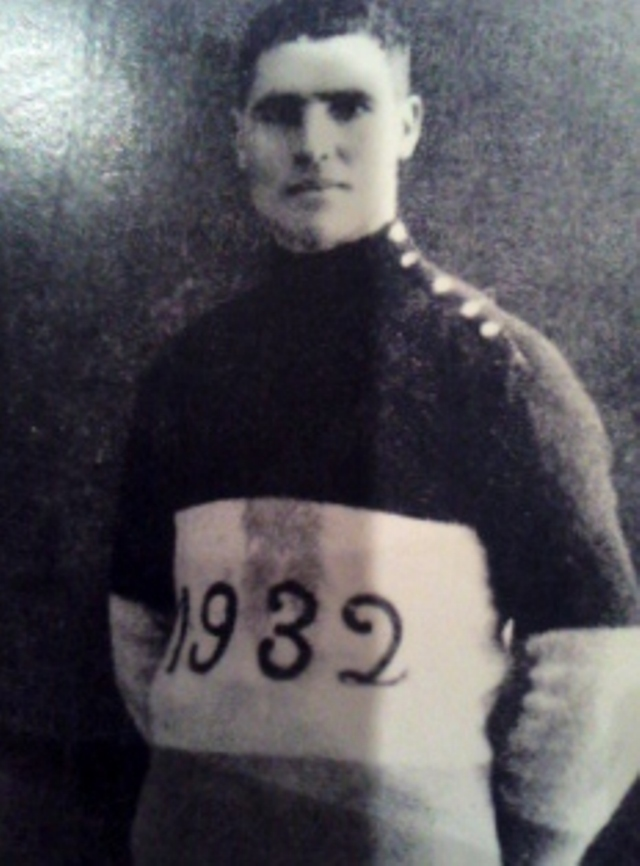
- Marinus Valentijn in 1932

Personal information
- Born: 21 October 1900 Sint Willebrord, Netherlands
- Died: 3 November 1991 (aged 91) Sint Willebrord, Netherlands

Cycling career
- Sport: Cycling
- Discipline: Road racing
- Role: Rider
Medal record
Representing Netherlands
Men's road bicycle racing
World Championships
Bronze medal – third place	1933 Montlhéry	Elite Men's Road Race

Marinus Valentijn (21 October 1900, Sint Willebrord - 3 November 1991, Sint Willebrord) was a Dutch professional road bicycle racer. He is most known for his bronze medal in the Elite race of the 1933 UCI Road World Championships.

== Palmares ==
1929
1st, The Hague-Brussels
1930
1st, The Hague-Brussels
1932 - Demol
(Netherlands) Dutch National Road Race Championship
1st, Ronde van Noordoost-Brabant
6th, World Road Race Championship
1933 - Demol
(bronze) World Road Race Championship
3rd, National Road Race Championship
3rd, Grand Prix des Nations
1934
11th, World Road Race Championship
1935
(Netherlands) Dutch National Road Race Championship
10th, Vuelta a España
