= Max Bulla =

Austrian cyclist

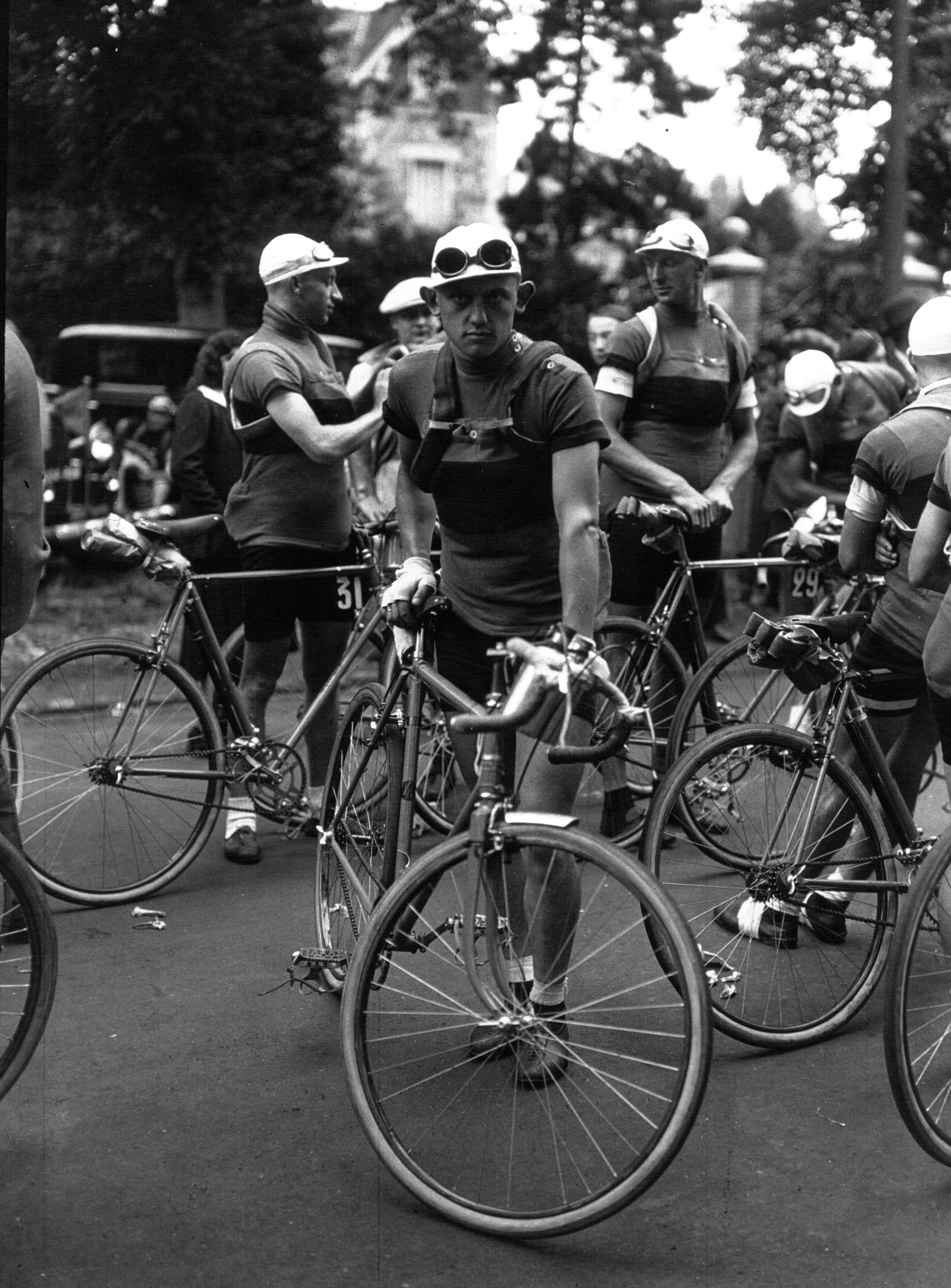

Personal information
- Full name: Max Bulla
- Born: September 26, 1905 Vienna, Austria
- Died: March 1, 1990 (aged 84) Pitten, Austria

Cycling career
- Sport: Cycling
- Discipline: Road
- Role: Rider

Major wins
- Grand Tours Tour de France 3 individual stages (1931) Vuelta a España 2 individual stages (1935) Stage races Tour de Suisse (1933) Circuit Français Peugeot (1931) One-day races and Classics National Road Race Championships (1926, 1927) Züri-Metzgete (1931) Tour du Lac Léman (1931)

Max Bulla (September 26, 1905 – March 1, 1990) was an Austrian professional road bicycle racer. In the 1931 Tour de France, Bulla won three stages and wore the yellow jersey for one day. He eventually finished the Tour in 15th place overall and won the classification for independent riders. Bulla finished fifth overall and won two stages at the 1935 Vuelta a España. He was born in Vienna and died in Pitten.

When Bulla won the second stage of the 1931 Tour de France and took the yellow jersey, the cyclists in the Tour de France were divided into national teams and touriste-routiers. The best cyclists were in the national teams, and the semi-amateurs were touriste-routiers. Bulla was a touriste-routier. In that second stage, the touriste-routiers started 10 minutes later than the national teams. Still, Bulla overtook the national teams, won the stage and took the lead, the only time in history that a touriste-routier was leading the Tour de France.

== Major results ==
1926
1st, National Road Championships
1927
1st, National Road Championships
1931
1st, Stage 15, Deutschland Tour, Trier
1st, Züri-Metzgete
15th Overall, Tour de France

1st, Overall Independents
1st, Stage 2, Caen—Dinan
3rd, Stage 4, Brest—Vannes
3rd, Stage 5, Vannes—Les Sables d'Olonne
2nd, Stage 7, Bordeaux—Bayonne
2nd, Stage 10, Luchon—Perpignan
1st, Stage 12, Perpignan—Marseille
1st, Stage 17, Montpellier—Aix-les-Bains

1931
1st, Tour du Lac Léman
1933
1st, Overall, Tour de Suisse
1st, Stage 2, Lucerne
1st, Stage 3, Geneva
1934
1st, Stage 5, Tour de Suisse, Berne
1935
5th Overall, Vuelta a España

1st, Stage 8, Valencia
1st, Stage 10, Granada

1936
1st, Stage 7, Tour de Suisse, Zürich
