= Vicente Carretero =

Spanish cyclist (1915–1962)

Personal information
- Born: 19 April 1915 Madrid, Spain
- Died: 27 September 1962 (aged 47) Madrid, Spain

Cycling career
- Sport: Cycling
- Discipline: Road
- Role: Rider

Professional team
- 1943: UD Sans

Vicente Carretero (19 April 1915 – 27 September 1962) was a Spanish racing cyclist. Professional from 1932 to 1947, Carretero won six stages of the Vuelta a España.

== Major results ==
1934
1st Clásica a los Puertos de Guadarrama
3rd Prueba Villafranca de Ordizia
1936
1st Tarragona–Madrid
1st Stages 3, 5, 10, 13 & 18 Vuelta a España
1940
1st Madrid–Valencia
1st Stage 2 Vuelta a Levante
1941
8th Overall Vuelta a España

1st Stage 21

1942
1st Circuito de la Ribera de Jalón
1st Stage 7 Circuito del Norte
1943
1st GP Álava
1st Stage 4 Vuelta a Levante
1944
1st Stages 1 & 4 (ITT) GP Ayuntamiento de Bilbao
2nd GP Pascuas
3rd GP Viscaya
3rd Road race, National Road Championships
1945
4th Overall Volta a Catalunya

1st Stages 3, 4, 8, 11, 12b & 13
