= Francisco Cepeda (cyclist) =

Spanish cyclist (1906–1935)

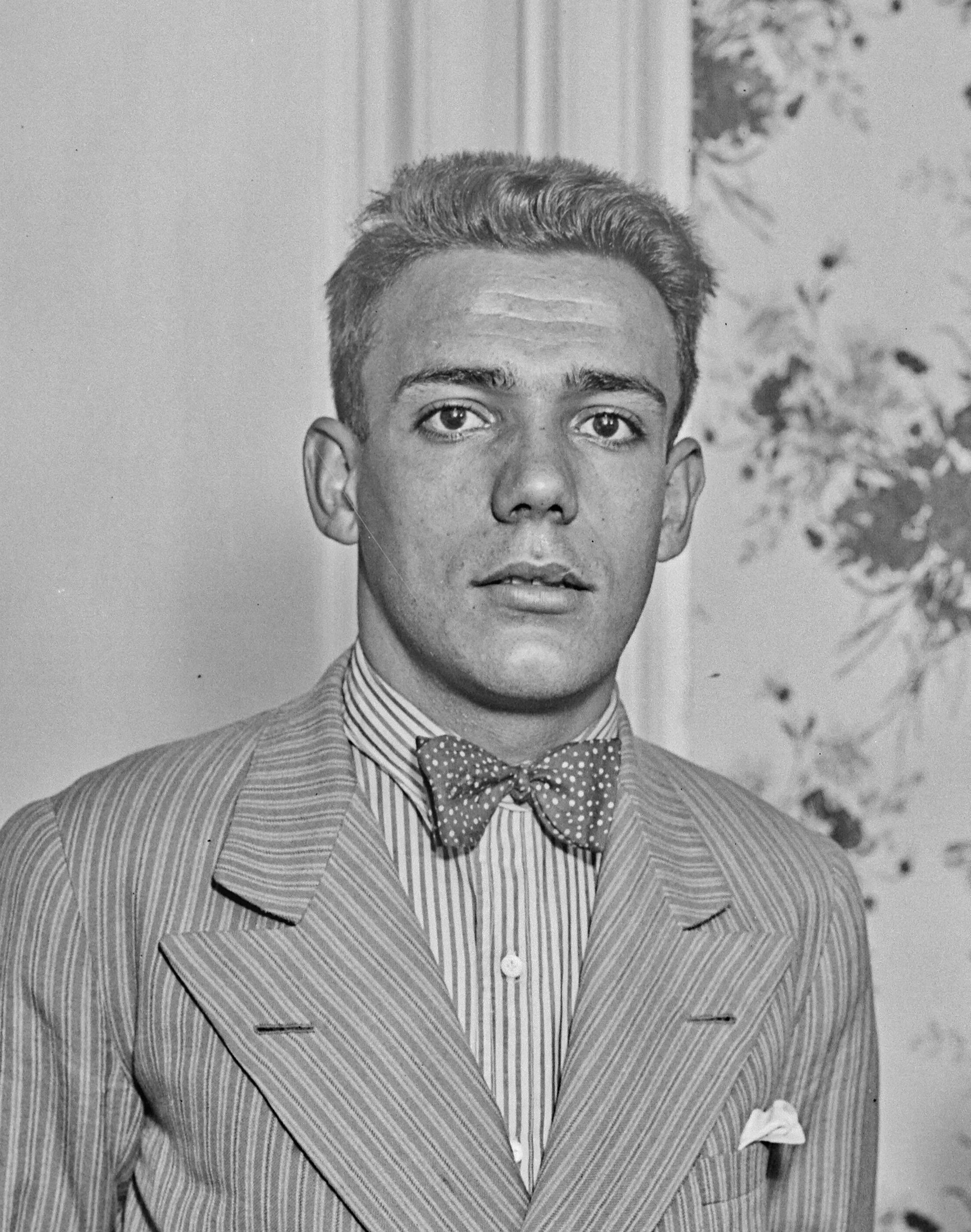

Personal information
- Born: 8 March 1906 Sopuerta, Spain
- Died: 14 July 1935 (aged 29) Grenoble, France

Cycling career
- Sport: Cycling
- Discipline: Road
- Role: Rider

Professional teams
- 1925: Sopuerta Sport
- 1926: Vitoria
- 1927: Athletic Club Bilbao
- 1928: Arenas Club Morales
- 1929: Dilecta-Wolber
- 1930: Soriano
- 1931-1933: Sociedad Ciclista Bilbaina
- 1934-1935: Orbea

Francisco Cepeda (8 March 1906 – 14 July 1935) was a Spanish cyclist.

On July 11, 1935 Cepeda crashed on the outskirts of Rioupéroux during the seventh stage of the Tour de France, 60 kilometres after crossing the summit of the Col du Galibier. His unconscious body was rushed to a hospital in Grenoble where he died three days later, on July 14, becoming the Tour’s first racing fatality, and only the second rider to die during the race, after Adolphe Hélière’s rest-day death in 1910 while swimming.

== Major results ==
1925
1st Circuito de Getxo
1926
2nd Prueba Villafranca de Ordizia
2nd Circuito de Getxo
1927
3rd Spanish National Road Race Championships
1929
1st Circuito de Getxo
1st GP Pascuas
1st Vuelta a Alava
2nd GP Vizcaya
1931
2nd Prueba Villafranca de Ordizia
3rd GP Vizcaya
1932
3rd Vuelta a Alava
