= Isidro Figueras =

Spanish cyclist (1913–1998)

Personal information
- Born: 1 January 1913
- Died: 1 March 1998 (aged 85)

Cycling career
- Sport: Cycling
- Discipline: Road
- Role: Rider

Isidro Figueras (1 January 1913 – 1 March 1998) was a Spanish racing cyclist. He rode in the 1935 Tour de France.
