= Fernand Fayolle =

French cyclist

Personal information
- Born: 21 July 1904
- Died: 18 September 1997 (aged 93)

Cycling career
- Sport: Cycling
- Discipline: Road
- Role: Rider

Fernand Fayolle (21 July 1904 – 18 September 1997) was a French racing cyclist. He rode in the 1928 Tour de France.
