= Antoine Dignef =

Belgian cyclist

Personal information
- Born: 3 October 1910 Velm, Belgium
- Died: 9 April 1991 (aged 80) Sint-Truiden, Belgium

Cycling career
- Sport: Cycling
- Discipline: Road
- Role: Rider

Professional teams
- 1932: Individual
- 1933–1934: Génial Lucifer–Hutchinson
- 1934: Depas
- 1935–1937: Colin–Wolber
- 1938: Victoria
- 1938–1940: Helyett–Hutchinson

Antoine Dignef (3 October 1910 – 9 April 1991) was a Belgian cyclist. He is best known for finishing 3rd overall and winning two stages of the Vuelta a España, making him the first ever winner of a stage in the Vuelta. He also won Scheldeprijs in 1938 and finished second in the 1935 Paris–Nice.

== Major results ==
1932
4th Overall Volta a Catalunya

1st Stages 2 & 7

1933
3rd Overall Volta a Catalunya

1st Stage 7

1934
2nd Overall Tour of Belgium
5th Overall Volta a Catalunya
9th Liège–Bastogne–Liège
1935
2nd Overall Paris–Nice

1st Stage 2

3rd Overall Vuelta a España

1st Stages 1 & 4

9th Paris–Roubaix
1936
9th La Flèche Wallonne
9th Overall Paris–Nice
1938
1st Scheldeprijs
1939
2nd Overall Tour of Belgium

1st Stage 3

4th Overall Tour de Luxembourg
