= Alfons Deloor =

Belgian cyclist

- Deloor in 1933

Personal information
- Born: 3 June 1910 Manage, Belgium
- Died: 23 March 1995 (aged 84) Mechelen, Belgium

Cycling career
- Sport: Cycling
- Role: Rider

Professional teams
- 1929: Individual
- 1930: Securitas
- 1931–1933: Dilecta–Wolber
- 1934: Cycles Catalunya
- 1935–1937: Colin–Wolber
- 1938: Helyett–Hutchinson
- 1939: Colin

Major wins
- Grand Tours Vuelta a España 1 individual stage1 (1936) One-day races and Classics Liège–Bastogne–Liège (1938)

Alfons Deloor (his name is also given as "De Loor") (3 June 1910 - 23 March 1995) was a Belgian racing cyclist. He reached second place at the 1936 Vuelta a España behind his brother Gustaaf, and won the 1938 Liège–Bastogne–Liège.

== Biography ==
Alfons Deloor was the fourth of five sons. Their father worked as a farmhand during the season, and in the coal mines of Hainaut otherwise. The family lived in De Klinge, a small Flemish town near the border with the Netherlands. Alfons and his younger brother Gustaaf were taught to ride a bike by their elder brother Edward.

His first cycling success came in 1931, finishing ninth in Liège–Bastogne–Liège. He went on to finish second in the 1932 Tour of Flanders. The same year, he was tenth in Paris–Roubaix, which he improved upon in the 1933 edition by finishing sixth. In the 1933 Tour de France, he finished 27th, and he was fourth in the 1933 Tour of Flanders and second in the Tour of Belgium.

In 1934, he ended in second place in the Volta a Catalunya, where he won the second stage, and third in the Tour of Belgium. He finished 6th in the 1935 Vuelta a España, which was won by his brother Gustaaf. That same year he finished 7th in Liège–Bastogne–Liège and tenth in Paris–Nice. The next year, he finished second behind his brother, and won the 14th stage. It is the only time that two brothers ended first and second in any of the three Grand Tours. That same year he ended sixth in the Tour de Suisse and third in Paris–Nice.

His most major win came in 1938, bringing home Liège–Bastogne–Liège. His career was ended by the Second World War, and afterwards he became a crane driver, mainly working on building and maintaining dykes.

== Major results ==
1929
8th Scheldeprijs
1931
2nd GP Dr. Eugeen Roggeman
3rd Omloop van België
9th Liège–Bastogne–Liège
1932
1st Omloop der Vlaamse Gewesten
2nd Tour of Flanders
5th Paris–Brussels
10th Paris–Roubaix
1933
2nd Ronde van Limburg
2nd Overall Tour of Belgium
2nd Tour de Corrèze
4th Overall Paris–Nice
4th Tour of Flanders
6th Paris–Roubaix
8th Paris–Brussels
1934
2nd Overall Volta a Catalunya

1st Stage 2

2nd Paris–Brussels
3rd Overall Tour of Belgium
1935
1st Omloop van België
6th Overall Vuelta a España
7th Liège–Bastogne–Liège
9th Scheldeprijs
10th Overall Paris–Nice
1936
2nd Overall Vuelta a España

1st Stage 14

3rd Overall Paris–Nice
6th Overall Tour de Suisse
7th Paris–Brussels
1937
7th Omloop der Vlaamse Gewesten
1938
1st Liège–Bastogne–Liège
1st Grand Prix de Brasschaat
2nd GP Dr. Eugeen Roggeman
3rd De Drie Zustersteden
