= Mariano Cañardo =

Spanish cyclist (1906–1987)

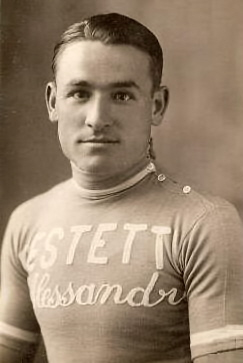

Personal information
- Full name: Mariano Cañardo Lacasta
- Nickname: The Catalan of Olite
- Born: 5 February 1906 Olite, Spain
- Died: 20 May 1987 (aged 81) Barcelona, Spain

Cycling career
- Sport: Cycling
- Discipline: Road
- Role: Rider

Professional teams
- 1927: FC Barcelona
- 1928: Elvish-Wolber
- 1929: FC Barcelona
- 1930: Styl
- 1931-1933: individual
- 1934-1935: Orbea
- 1936: Colin-Wolber
- 1937: France Sport-Dunlop
- 1938-1940: individual
- 1941-1942: FC Barcelona

Major wins
- Grand Tours Tour de France 1 individual stage (1937) Vuelta a España 3 individual stages (1935, 1936) Stage races Volta a Catalunya (1928, 1929, 1930, 1932, 1935, 1936, 1939) Tour of the Basque Country (1930) Tour du Maroc (1937, 1938) One-day races and Classics National Road Race Championships (1930, 1931, 1933, 1936)

Mariano Cañardo Lacasta (5 February 1906 – 21 June 1987) was a Spanish professional road racing cyclist. He won a record seven editions of the Volta a Catalunya in the 1920s and 1930s, as well as four Spanish national championship titles and one Tour de France stage win. Born in Olite, Navarra, his nickname was the Catalan of Olite.

== Biography ==
Cañardo grew up in Navarra, but, orphaned since 1919, he moved with his sister to Barcelona, Catalonia, where he discovered the bike. He was professional from 1926 until 1943, excelling mainly in the early Spanish stage races. An excellent climber and time triallist, Cañardo was next to invincible in the Volta a Catalunya, which he won seven times in addition to two second and two third places. In 1928 he won the Volta a la Comunitat Valenciana and in 1930 he became the first Spaniard to win the Tour of the Basque Country.

In 1935 he finished second overall to Belgian Gustaaf Deloor and won stage 5 in the first Vuelta a España. He won two stages at the 1936 Vuelta a España and one stage in the 1937 Tour de France. He won the first two runnings of the Tour of Morocco in 1937 and 1938. His career was hampered by the Spanish Civil War from 1936 to 1939 when all racing in Spain was suspended, and World War II, which disrupted racing in the rest of Europe. He ended his career in 1943.

After retiring, he started a successful career as a sports director and race organizer. He was sports director of several cycling teams, among which the Spanish national cycling team, which entered the Tour de France from 1951 to 1953. Later he became race director of various Catalan races, including the Setmana Catalana and the Circuit Català. He was a member of the board of directors of the Spanish Cycling Federation and was president of the Catalan Cycling Federation from 1969 to 1974. He received the Medalla Forjadors for his merit in the sports history of Catalonia in 1987.

== Major results ==
1928
Volta a Catalunya
1929
Volta a Catalunya
Volta a la Comunitat Valenciana
1930
Circuito de Getxo
(Spain) Spanish National Road Race Championship
Vuelta a Santander
Volta a Catalunya
Tour of the Basque Country
Vuelta a Levante
Barcelona
1931
(Spain) Spanish National Road Race Championship
Madrid
1932
Trofeo Masferrer
Volta a Catalunya
1933
(Spain) Spanish National Road Race Championship
Trofeo Masferrer
Barcelona
1934
Tour de France:

9th place overall classification

1935
Vuelta a España:

Winner stage 5
2nd place overall classification

Volta a Catalunya
1936
Stage 1 GP Republica
(Spain) Spanish National Road Race Championship
Volta a Catalunya
Vuelta a España:

10th place overall classification
Winner stages 7 and 15

Palma de Mallorca
Tour de France:

6th place overall classification

1937
Tour du Maroc
Tour de France:

Winner stage 14B

1938
Tour du Maroc
1939
Circuito del Norte (incl. 4 stages)
Volta a Catalunya
Madrid - Lisboa
1940
Clasica a los Puertos de Guadarrama

=== Grand Tour general classification results timeline ===
Grand Tour	1934	1935	1936	1937	1938
Vuelta a España	No race	2	10	No race	
Giro d'Italia	Did not contest during career				
Tour de France	9	—	6	30	16
