= Gustaaf Deloor =

Belgian cyclist

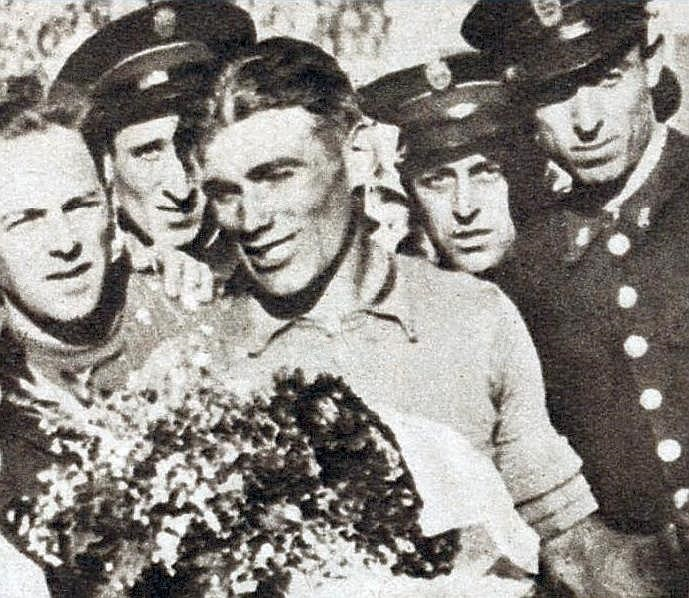
- Deloor after winning the 1936 Vuelta a España

Personal information
- Full name: Gustaaf Deloor
- Born: 24 June 1913 De Klinge, Belgium
- Died: 28 January 2002 (aged 88) Mechelen, Belgium

Cycling career
- Sport: Cycling
- Discipline: Road
- Role: Rider

Professional teams
- 1933: Dilecta – Wolber
- 1934: De Dion – Bouton
- 1934: Catalunya Cycles
- 1935–1937: Colin – Wolber
- 1938: De Dion – Bouton
- 1939: Colin

Major wins
- Grand Tours Tour de France 1 individual stage (1937) Vuelta a España General classification (1935, 1936) 6 individual stages (1935, 1936)

Gustaaf Deloor (24 June 1913 – 28 January 2002) was a Belgian road racing cyclist and the winner of the first two editions of the Vuelta a España in 1935 and 1936. The 1936 edition remains the slowest winning finish time of the Vuelta in 150:07:54, the race consisted of 22 stages with a total length of 4,407 km. Gustaaf finished first and his older brother Alfons finished second overall.

== Biography ==
Deloor was professional from 1932 until 1939 when World War II caused the end of his career. Deloor was serving in the Belgian army at Fort Eben-Emael near Maastricht when the German army invaded the fort on 10 May 1940, but Deloor together with some 1,200 Belgians were taken prisoner. In Stalag II-B or the prisoner-of-war camp II-B, Deloor was able to work in the kitchen due to a German officer that was interested in sports. When Deloor returned from the war, he came back to a plundered house and decided to start a new life in the United States of America in 1949. After ten years in New York he moved to Los Angeles. He worked as a mechanic until, in 1956, an affluent client helped him find a job at Cape Canaveral aerospace centre. Here he worked for the Marquardt Corporation, the aeronautical engineering firm, in the development and design of the ramjet engine for NASA that was used on the Apollo 11 Saturn V rocket. He lost his first wife in 1966 but remarried. In 1980, Deloor returned to Belgium.

== Major results ==
1931
3rd GP Dr. Eugeen Roggeman
1932
1st Tour of Flanders amateurs
1934
1st Heistse Pijl
1st GP Dr. Eugeen Roggeman
4th Overall Tour of Belgium
1935
1st Overall Vuelta a España

1st Stages 3, 11 & 14

3rd Scheldeprijs
3rd Circuit de Paris
1936
1st Overall Vuelta a España

1st Stages 2, 4 & 6

2nd Overall Tour de Suisse
1937
1st Stage 6 Tour de France
2nd Liège–Bastogne–Liège
3rd De Drie Zustersteden
1939
1st GP Stad Sint-Niklaas
1st Grote 1-MeiPrijs
