= List of teams and cyclists in the 1931 Tour de France =

List of cyclists

In the 1931 Tour de France, for the second year, the race was run in the national team format, with six different teams. Belgium, Italy, Germany and France each sent a team with eight cyclists. Australia and Switzerland sent a combined team, each with four cyclists. The last team was the Spanish team, with only one cyclist. In addition, 40 cyclists joined as touriste-routiers.

The French team was favourite, because they had dominated the 1930 Tour. The most competition was expected from the Belgian team, followed by the Italian team.

== By rider ==
Legend
No.	Starting number worn by the rider during the Tour
Pos.	Position in the general classification
DNF	Denotes a rider who did not finish

No.	Name	Nationality	Team	Pos.	Ref
1	Alfred Haemerlinck	Belgium	Belgium	DNF	
2	Gaston Rebry	Belgium	Belgium	4	
3	Romain Gijssels	Belgium	Belgium	DNF	
4	Jef Demuysere	Belgium	Belgium	2	
5	Julien Vervaecke	Belgium	Belgium	6	
6	Alphonse Schepers	Belgium	Belgium	18	
7	Bernard Van Rysselberghe	Belgium	Belgium	DNF	
8	Maurice De Waele	Belgium	Belgium	5	
9	Luigi Giacobbe	Italy	Italy	DNF	
10	Raffaele di Paco	Italy	Italy	17	
11	Fabio Battesini	Italy	Italy	30	
12	Francesco Camusso	Italy	Italy	DNF	
13	Eugenio Gestri	Italy	Italy	DNF	
14	Felice Gremo	Italy	Italy	DNF	
15	Michele Orecchia	Italy	Italy	25	
16	Antonio Pesenti	Italy	Italy	3	
17	Hubert Opperman	Australia	Australia/Switzerland	12	
18	Richard Lamb	Australia	Australia/Switzerland	35	
19	Ossie Nicholson	Australia	Australia/Switzerland	DNF	
20	Frankie Thomas	Australia	Australia/Switzerland	DNF	
21	Jules Gillard	Switzerland	Australia/Switzerland	DNF	
22	Roger Pipoz	Switzerland	Australia/Switzerland	21	
23	Georges Antenen	Switzerland	Australia/Switzerland	DNF	
24	Albert Büchi	Switzerland	Australia/Switzerland	9	
25	Oskar Thierbach	Germany	Germany	11	
26	Alfred Siegel	Germany	Germany	23	
27	Erich Metze	Germany	Germany	8	
28	Ludwig Geyer	Germany	Germany	19	
29	Kurt Stöpel	Germany	Germany	16	
30	Hermann Buse	Germany	Germany	22	
31	Herbert Sieronski	Germany	Germany	20	
32	Karl Altenburger	Germany	Germany	DNF	
33	Antonin Magne	France	France	1	
34	Benoît Faure	France	France	12	
35	André Leducq	France	France	10	
36	Jean Maréchal	France	France	32	
37	Charles Pélissier	France	France	14	
38	Joseph Mauclair	France	France	27	
39	Léon Le Calvez	France	France	DNF	
40	Louis Peglion	France	France	7	
41	Francisco Cepeda	Spain	Spain	DNF	
101	Jules Goedhuys	Belgium	Touriste-routier	33	
102	Achiel Viaene	Belgium	Touriste-routier	DNF	
103	Gérard Loncke	Belgium	Touriste-routier	DNF	
104	Auguste Van Tricht	Belgium	Touriste-routier	DNF	
105	Robert Van Grootenbruele	Belgium	Touriste-routier	DNF	
106	Jean Naert	Belgium	Touriste-routier	DNF	
107	Georges Laloup	Belgium	Touriste-routier	DNF	
108	Giuseppe Pancera	Italy	Touriste-routier	DNF	
109	Alessandro Catalani	Italy	Touriste-routier	DNF	
110	Amulio Viarengo	Italy	Touriste-routier	DNF	
111	Aristide Cavallini	Italy	Touriste-routier	DNF	
112	Pietro Mori	Italy	Touriste-routier	DNF	
113	Pierino Ferioli	Italy	Touriste-routier	DNF	
114	Salvador Cardona Balbastre	Spain	Touriste-routier	DNF	
115	Max Bulla	Austria	Touriste-routier	15	
116	Erich Ussat	Germany	Touriste-routier	DNF	
117	Kurt Nitzschke	Germany	Touriste-routier	DNF	
118	Karl Olböter	Germany	Touriste-routier	DNF	
119	Lucien Laval	France	Touriste-routier	DNF	
120	René Bernard	France	Touriste-routier	DNF	
121	Jean Bidot	France	Touriste-routier	DNF	
122	Louis Bajard	France	Touriste-routier	28	
123	Georges Berton	France	Touriste-routier	DNF	
124	Francis Bouillet	France	Touriste-routier	DNF	
125	Robert Brugère	France	Touriste-routier	DNF	
126	Adrien Buttafocchi	France	Touriste-routier	DNF	
127	Fernand Fayolle	France	Touriste-routier	29	
128	François Favé	France	Touriste-routier	DNF	
129	André Godinat	France	Touriste-routier	DNF	
130	Marius Guiramand	France	Touriste-routier	24	
131	Gabriel Hargues	France	Touriste-routier	DNF	
132	François Henri	France	Touriste-routier	34	
133	Jean Fontenay	France	Touriste-routier	DNF	
134	Marcel Mazeyrat	France	Touriste-routier	DNF	
135	François Moreels	France	Touriste-routier	DNF	
136	Julien Perrain	France	Touriste-routier	DNF	
137	Jean Riondet	France	Touriste-routier	DNF	
138	Fernand Robache	France	Touriste-routier	DNF	
139	André Van Vierst	France	Touriste-routier	26	
140	Lazare Venot	France	Touriste-routier	31	
