= 1931 Tour de France, Stage 1 to Stage 12 =

Cycling race stages

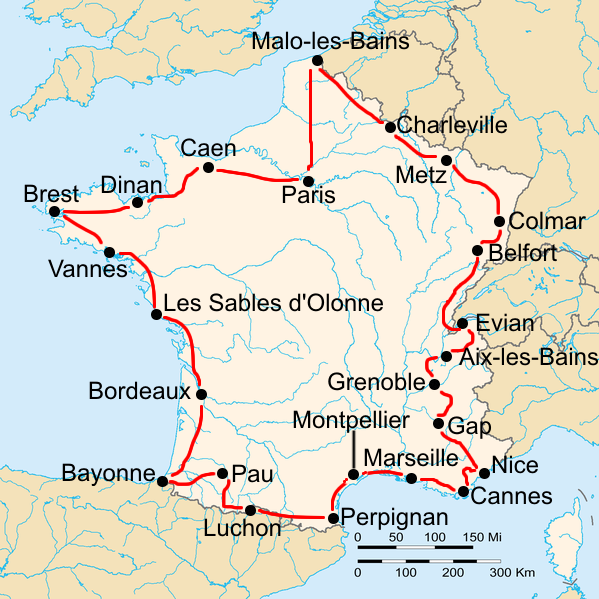
Route of the 1931 Tour de France

The 1931 Tour de France was the 25th edition of the Tour de France, one of cycling's Grand Tours. The Tour began in Paris with a flat stage on 30 June, and Stage 12 occurred on 13 July with a flat stage to Marseille. The race finished in Paris on 26 July.

== Stage 1 ==
30 June 1931 - Paris to Caen, 208 km (129 mi)

Stage 1 result and general classification after stage 1

Rank	Rider	Team	Time
1	Alfred Haemerlinck (BEL)	Belgium	6h 17' 12"
2	Charles Pélissier (FRA)	France	s.t.
3	Raffaele di Paco (ITA)	Italy	s.t.
4	Léon Le Calvez (FRA)	France	s.t.
5	Maurice De Waele (BEL)	Belgium	s.t.
6	Max Bulla (AUT)	Touriste-routier	s.t.
=7	Gaston Rebry (BEL)	Belgium	s.t.
=7	André Leducq (FRA)	France	s.t.
=7	Romain Gijssels (BEL)	Belgium	s.t.
=7	Jef Demuysere (BEL)	Belgium	s.t.

== Stage 2 ==
1 July 1931 - Caen to Dinan, 212 km (132 mi)

Stage 2 result

Rank	Rider	Team	Time
1	Max Bulla (AUT)	Touriste-routier	6h 37' 14"
2	René Bernard (FRA)	Touriste-routier	s.t.
3	André Van Vierst (FRA)	Touriste-routier	s.t.
4	Charles Pélissier (FRA)	France	+ 2' 46"
5	Raffaele di Paco (ITA)	Italy	s.t.
6	Alfred Haemerlinck (BEL)	Belgium	s.t.
7	Erich Metze (GER)	Germany	s.t.
8	Jef Demuysere (BEL)	Belgium	s.t.
9	Léon Le Calvez (FRA)	France	s.t.
10	Hubert Opperman (AUS)	Australia/Switzerland	s.t.

General classification after stage 2

Rank	Rider	Team	Time
1	Max Bulla (AUT)	Touriste-routier	
2	André Van Vierst (FRA)	Touriste-routier	+ 1' 47"
3	Alfred Haemerlinck (BEL)	Belgium	+ 2' 46"
4			
5			
6			
7			
8			
9			
10			

== Stage 3 ==
2 July 1931 - Dinan to Brest, 206 km (128 mi)

Stage 3 result

Rank	Rider	Team	Time
1	Fabio Battesini (ITA)	Italy	6h 17' 29"
2	Léon Le Calvez (FRA)	France	s.t.
3	Kurt Stöpel (GER)	Germany	s.t.
4	Erich Metze (GER)	Germany	s.t.
5	Karl Altenburger (GER)	Germany	s.t.
6	Romain Gijssels (BEL)	Belgium	s.t.
7	Alphonse Schepers (BEL)	Belgium	s.t.
8	Georges Antenen (SUI)	Australia/Switzerland	s.t.
9	Maurice De Waele (BEL)	Belgium	s.t.
10	Alfred Haemerlinck (BEL)	Belgium	s.t.

General classification after stage 3

Rank	Rider	Team	Time
1	Léon Le Calvez (FRA)	France	
2			
3			
4			
5			
6			
7			
8			
9			
10			

== Stage 4 ==
3 July 1931 - Brest to Vannes, 211 km (131 mi)

Stage 4 result

Rank	Rider	Team	Time
1	André Godinat (FRA)	Touriste-routier	6h 08' 16"
2	Jean Naert (BEL)	Touriste-routier	+ 6' 15"
3	Max Bulla (AUT)	Touriste-routier	+ 7' 21"
4	Raffaele di Paco (ITA)	Italy	+ 8' 31"
5	Fabio Battesini (ITA)	Italy	s.t.
6	Kurt Stöpel (GER)	Germany	s.t.
7	Karl Altenburger (GER)	Germany	s.t.
8	Charles Pélissier (FRA)	France	s.t.
9	Léon Le Calvez (FRA)	France	s.t.
10	Georges Antenen (SUI)	Australia/Switzerland	s.t.

General classification after stage 4

Rank	Rider	Team	Time
1	Raffaele di Paco (ITA)	Italy	
2			
3			
4			
5			
6			
7			
8			
9			
10			

== Stage 5 ==
4 July 1931 - Vannes to Les Sables d'Olonne, 202 km (126 mi)

Stage 5 result

Rank	Rider	Team	Time
1	Charles Pélissier (FRA)	France	6h 36' 49"
2	Antonin Magne (FRA)	France	s.t.
3	Max Bulla (AUT)	Touriste-routier	s.t.
4	Raffaele di Paco (ITA)	Italy	s.t.
5	Jef Demuysere (BEL)	Belgium	s.t.
6	Alfred Haemerlinck (BEL)	Belgium	s.t.
7	Gaston Rebry (BEL)	Belgium	s.t.
8	Romain Gijssels (BEL)	Belgium	s.t.
9	Julien Vervaecke (BEL)	Belgium	s.t.
10	Bernard Van Rysselberghe (BEL)	Belgium	s.t.

General classification after stage 5

Rank	Rider	Team	Time
=1	Charles Pélissier (FRA)	France	
=1	Raffaele di Paco (ITA)	Italy	
3			
4			
5			
6			
7			
8			
9			
10			

== Stage 6 ==
5 July 1931 - Les Sables d'Olonne to Bordeaux, 338 km (210 mi)

Stage 6 result

Rank	Rider	Team	Time
1	Alfred Haemerlinck (BEL)	Belgium	10h 46' 20"
2	André Leducq (FRA)	France	s.t.
3	Fabio Battesini (ITA)	Italy	s.t.
4	Raffaele di Paco (ITA)	Italy	s.t.
5	Alfred Siegel (GER)	Germany	s.t.
6	Léon Le Calvez (FRA)	France	s.t.
7	Julien Vervaecke (BEL)	Belgium	s.t.
=8	Gaston Rebry (BEL)	Belgium	s.t.
=8	Romain Gijssels (BEL)	Belgium	s.t.
=8	Jef Demuysere (BEL)	Belgium	s.t.

General classification after stage 6

Rank	Rider	Team	Time
1	Raffaele di Paco (ITA)	Italy	
2			
3			
4			
5			
6			
7			
8			
9			
10			

== Stage 7 ==
6 July 1931 - Bordeaux to Bayonne, 180 km (110 mi)

Stage 7 result

Rank	Rider	Team	Time
1	Gérard Loncke (BEL)	Touriste-routier	5h 37' 45"
2	Max Bulla (AUT)	Touriste-routier	s.t.
3	André Godinat (FRA)	Touriste-routier	s.t.
4	Jean Bidot (FRA)	Touriste-routier	s.t.
5	Giuseppe Pancera (ITA)	Touriste-routier	s.t.
6	Francis Bouillet (FRA)	Touriste-routier	s.t.
7	Amulio Viarengo (ITA)	Touriste-routier	s.t.
8	Robert Van Grootenbruele (BEL)	Touriste-routier	s.t.
=9	Robert Brugère (FRA)	Touriste-routier	s.t.
=9	Jean Naert (BEL)	Touriste-routier	s.t.

General classification after stage 7

Rank	Rider	Team	Time
1	Raffaele di Paco (ITA)	Italy	
2			
3			
4			
5			
6			
7			
8			
9			
10			

== Stage 8 ==
7 July 1931 - Bayonne to Pau, 106 km (66 mi)

Stage 8 result

Rank	Rider	Team	Time
1	Charles Pélissier (FRA)	France	3h 24' 20"
2	Erich Metze (GER)	Germany	s.t.
3	André Leducq (FRA)	France	s.t.
4	Achiel Viaene (BEL)	Touriste-routier	s.t.
5	Oskar Thierbach (GER)	Germany	s.t.
6	Fabio Battesini (ITA)	Italy	+ 1' 25"
7	Raffaele di Paco (ITA)	Italy	s.t.
8	Bernard Van Rysselberghe (BEL)	Belgium	s.t.
9	Gaston Rebry (BEL)	Belgium	s.t.
10	Louis Peglion (FRA)	France	s.t.

General classification after stage 8

Rank	Rider	Team	Time
1	Charles Pélissier (FRA)	France	
2	Erich Metze (GER)	Germany	s.t.
3	Oskar Thierbach (GER)	Germany	+ 50"
4			
5			
6			
7			
8			
9			
10			

== Stage 9 ==
8 July 1931 - Pau to Luchon, 231 km (144 mi)

Stage 9 result

Rank	Rider	Team	Time
1	Antonin Magne (FRA)	France	8h 56' 03"
2	Antonio Pesenti (ITA)	Italy	+ 4' 42"
3	Jef Demuysere (BEL)	Belgium	+ 7' 44"
4	Maurice De Waele (BEL)	Belgium	s.t.
5	Albert Büchi (SUI)	Australia/Switzerland	s.t.
6	Louis Peglion (FRA)	France	+ 13' 59"
7	Léon Le Calvez (FRA)	France	s.t.
8	Alphonse Schepers (BEL)	Belgium	+ 20' 47"
9	Joseph Mauclair (FRA)	France	s.t.
10	Gaston Rebry (BEL)	Belgium	s.t.

General classification after stage 9

Rank	Rider	Team	Time
1	Antonin Magne (FRA)	France	
2	Antonio Pesenti (ITA)	Italy	+ 9' 32"
3	Jef Demuysere (BEL)	Belgium	+ 10' 44"
4			
5			
6			
7			
8			
9			
10			

== Stage 10 ==
10 July 1931 - Luchon to Perpignan, 322 km (200 mi)

Stage 10 result

Rank	Rider	Team	Time
1	Raffaele di Paco (ITA)	Italy	12h 33' 57"
2	Max Bulla (AUT)	Touriste-routier	s.t.
3	André Leducq (FRA)	France	s.t.
4	Charles Pélissier (FRA)	France	s.t.
5	Amulio Viarengo (ITA)	Touriste-routier	s.t.
6	Léon Le Calvez (FRA)	France	s.t.
=7	Alfred Haemerlinck (BEL)	Belgium	s.t.
=7	Gaston Rebry (BEL)	Belgium	s.t.
=7	Jef Demuysere (BEL)	Belgium	s.t.
=7	Julien Vervaecke (BEL)	Belgium	s.t.

General classification after stage 10

Rank	Rider	Team	Time
1	Antonin Magne (FRA)	France	
2	Antonio Pesenti (ITA)	Italy	+ 9' 32"
3	Jef Demuysere (BEL)	Belgium	+ 10' 44"
4			
5			
6			
7			
8			
9			
10			

== Stage 11 ==
12 July 1931 - Perpignan to Montpellier, 164 km (102 mi)

Stage 11 result

Rank	Rider	Team	Time
1	Raffaele di Paco (ITA)	Italy	5h 50' 36"
2	Charles Pélissier (FRA)	France	s.t.
3	André Leducq (FRA)	France	+ 31"
4	Fabio Battesini (ITA)	Italy	s.t.
5	Léon Le Calvez (FRA)	France	s.t.
6	Kurt Stöpel (GER)	Germany	s.t.
7	Max Bulla (AUT)	Touriste-routier	s.t.
8	Oskar Thierbach (GER)	Germany	s.t.
=9	Gaston Rebry (BEL)	Belgium	s.t.
=9	Jef Demuysere (BEL)	Belgium	s.t.

General classification after stage 11

Rank	Rider	Team	Time
1	Antonin Magne (FRA)	France	
2	Antonio Pesenti (ITA)	Italy	+ 9' 32"
3	Jef Demuysere (BEL)	Belgium	+ 10' 44"
4			
5			
6			
7			
8			
9			
10			

== Stage 12 ==
13 July 1931 - Montpellier to Marseille, 207 km (129 mi)

Stage 12 result

Rank	Rider	Team	Time
1	Max Bulla (AUT)	Touriste-routier	6h 22' 07"
2	Alessandro Catalani (ITA)	Touriste-routier	s.t.
3	Giuseppe Pancera (ITA)	Touriste-routier	+ 2' 07"
4	André Van Vierst (FRA)	Touriste-routier	+ 5' 38"
5	René Bernard (FRA)	Touriste-routier	s.t.
6	Kurt Nitzschke (GER)	Touriste-routier	s.t.
7	François Henri (FRA)	Touriste-routier	+ 6' 37"
8	Marius Guiramand (FRA)	Touriste-routier	s.t.
9	Fernand Fayolle (FRA)	Touriste-routier	s.t.
10	Erich Ussat (GER)	Touriste-routier	+ 12' 08"

General classification after stage 12

Rank	Rider	Team	Time
1	Antonin Magne (FRA)	France	
2	Antonio Pesenti (ITA)	Italy	+ 9' 32"
3	Jef Demuysere (BEL)	Belgium	+ 10' 44"
4			
5			
6			
7			
8			
9			
10			
