= 1931 Tour de France, Stage 13 to Stage 24 =

Cycling race stages

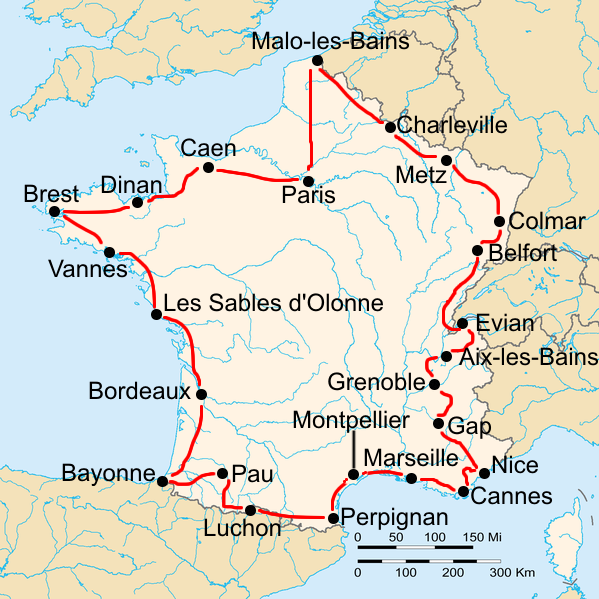
Route of the 1931 Tour de France

The 1931 Tour de France was the 25th edition of the Tour de France, one of cycling's Grand Tours. The Tour began in Paris with a flat stage on 30 June, and Stage 13 occurred on 13 July with a flat stage from Marseille. The race finished in Paris on 26 July.

== Stage 13 ==
14 July 1931 - Marseille to Cannes, 181 km (112 mi)

Stage 13 result

Rank	Rider	Team	Time
1	Charles Pélissier (FRA)	France	6h 41' 20"
2	Raffaele di Paco (ITA)	Italy	s.t.
3	René Bernard (FRA)	Touriste-routier	s.t.
4	Hermann Buse (GER)	Germany	s.t.
5	André Van Vierst (FRA)	Touriste-routier	s.t.
6	Léon Le Calvez (FRA)	France	s.t.
7	Marius Guiramand (FRA)	Touriste-routier	s.t.
=8	Gaston Rebry (BEL)	Belgium	s.t.
=8	Jef Demuysere (BEL)	Belgium	s.t.
=8	Felice Gremo (ITA)	Italy	s.t.

General classification after stage 13

Rank	Rider	Team	Time
1	Antonin Magne (FRA)	France	
2	Antonio Pesenti (ITA)	Italy	+ 9' 32"
3	Jef Demuysere (BEL)	Belgium	+ 10' 44"
4			
5			
6			
7			
8			
9			
10			

== Stage 14 ==
15 July 1931 - Cannes to Nice, 132 km (82 mi)

Stage 14 result

Rank	Rider	Team	Time
1	Eugenio Gestri (ITA)	Italy	4h 47' 01"
2	Antonio Pesenti (ITA)	Italy	+ 17"
3	Felice Gremo (ITA)	Italy	+ 4' 09"
4	Antonin Magne (FRA)	France	+ 4' 48"
5	Louis Peglion (FRA)	France	+ 5' 26"
6	Benoît Faure (FRA)	France	+ 6' 46"
7	Raffaele di Paco (ITA)	Italy	+ 8' 49"
8	Fernand Fayolle (FRA)	Touriste-routier	s.t.
9	Michele Orecchia (ITA)	Italy	s.t.
10	Hubert Opperman (AUS)	Australia/Switzerland	+ 10' 10"

General classification after stage 14

Rank	Rider	Team	Time
1	Antonin Magne (FRA)	France	
2	Antonio Pesenti (ITA)	Italy	+ 5' 01"
3	Jef Demuysere (BEL)	Belgium	+ 16' 06"
4			
5			
6			
7			
8			
9			
10			

== Stage 15 ==
17 July 1931 - Nice to Gap, 233 km (145 mi)

Stage 15 result

Rank	Rider	Team	Time
1	Jef Demuysere (BEL)	Belgium	8h 43' 01"
2	Antonio Pesenti (ITA)	Italy	+ 2' 19"
3	Raffaele di Paco (ITA)	Italy	+ 2' 22"
4	Antonin Magne (FRA)	France	s.t.
5	Charles Pélissier (FRA)	France	+ 2' 29"
6	Alphonse Schepers (BEL)	Belgium	+ 8' 27"
7	Maurice De Waele (BEL)	Belgium	s.t.
8	Max Bulla (AUT)	Touriste-routier	s.t.
9	Marius Guiramand (FRA)	Touriste-routier	s.t.
10	Giuseppe Pancera (ITA)	Touriste-routier	s.t.

General classification after stage 15

Rank	Rider	Team	Time
1	Antonin Magne (FRA)	France	
2	Antonio Pesenti (ITA)	Italy	+ 4' 58"
3	Jef Demuysere (BEL)	Belgium	+ 13' 44"
4			
5			
6			
7			
8			
9			
10			

== Stage 16 ==
18 July 1931 - Gap to Grenoble, 102 km (63 mi)

Stage 16 result

Rank	Rider	Team	Time
1	Charles Pélissier (FRA)	France	3h 31' 43"
2	Kurt Stöpel (GER)	Germany	s.t.
3	Raffaele di Paco (ITA)	Italy	s.t.
4	Alphonse Schepers (BEL)	Belgium	s.t.
5	Maurice De Waele (BEL)	Belgium	s.t.
6	Oskar Thierbach (GER)	Germany	s.t.
7	Max Bulla (AUT)	Touriste-routier	s.t.
=8	Gaston Rebry (BEL)	Belgium	s.t.
=8	Jef Demuysere (BEL)	Belgium	s.t.
=8	Julien Vervaecke (BEL)	Belgium	s.t.

General classification after stage 16

Rank	Rider	Team	Time
1	Antonin Magne (FRA)	France	
2	Antonio Pesenti (ITA)	Italy	+ 4' 58"
3	Jef Demuysere (BEL)	Belgium	+ 13' 44"
4			
5			
6			
7			
8			
9			
10			

== Stage 17 ==
19 July 1931 - Grenoble to Aix-les-Bains, 230 km (140 mi)

Stage 17 result

Rank	Rider	Team	Time
1	Max Bulla (AUT)	Touriste-routier	8h 37' 02"
2	Gaston Rebry (BEL)	Belgium	s.t.
3	Antonin Magne (FRA)	France	s.t.
4	Michele Orecchia (ITA)	Italy	s.t.
5	Julien Vervaecke (BEL)	Belgium	s.t.
6	Jef Demuysere (BEL)	Belgium	s.t.
=7	Felice Gremo (ITA)	Italy	s.t.
=7	Antonio Pesenti (ITA)	Italy	s.t.
=7	Albert Büchi (SUI)	Australia/Switzerland	s.t.
10	Benoît Faure (FRA)	France	+ 1' 27"

General classification after stage 17

Rank	Rider	Team	Time
1	Antonin Magne (FRA)	France	
2	Antonio Pesenti (ITA)	Italy	+ 4' 58"
3	Jef Demuysere (BEL)	Belgium	+ 13' 44"
4			
5			
6			
7			
8			
9			
10			

== Stage 18 ==
20 July 1931 - Aix-les-Bains to Evian, 204 km (127 mi)

Stage 18 result

Rank	Rider	Team	Time
1	Jef Demuysere (BEL)	Belgium	7h 57' 13"
2	André Leducq (FRA)	France	+ 48"
3	Kurt Stöpel (GER)	Germany	s.t.
4	Max Bulla (AUT)	Touriste-routier	s.t.
5	Jules Goedhuys (BEL)	Touriste-routier	s.t.
6	Charles Pélissier (FRA)	France	s.t.
=7	Gaston Rebry (BEL)	Belgium	s.t.
=7	Julien Vervaecke (BEL)	Belgium	s.t.
=7	Alphonse Schepers (BEL)	Belgium	s.t.
=7	Maurice De Waele (BEL)	Belgium	s.t.

General classification after stage 18

Rank	Rider	Team	Time
1	Antonin Magne (FRA)	France	
2	Antonio Pesenti (ITA)	Italy	+ 4' 58"
3	Jef Demuysere (BEL)	Belgium	+ 12' 56"
4			
5			
6			
7			
8			
9			
10			

== Stage 19 ==
21 July 1931 - Evian to Belfort, 282 km (175 mi)

Stage 19 result

Rank	Rider	Team	Time
1	Raffaele di Paco (ITA)	Italy	10h 33' 48"
2	Ludwig Geyer (GER)	Germany	s.t.
3	Gaston Rebry (BEL)	Belgium	+ 6' 24"
4	Oskar Thierbach (GER)	Germany	+ 7' 31"
5	Maurice De Waele (BEL)	Belgium	s.t.
6	Charles Pélissier (FRA)	France	+ 9' 20"
7	Max Bulla (AUT)	Touriste-routier	s.t.
8	Jef Demuysere (BEL)	Belgium	s.t.
9	Antonio Pesenti (ITA)	Italy	s.t.
10	René Bernard (FRA)	Touriste-routier	s.t.

General classification after stage 19

Rank	Rider	Team	Time
1	Antonin Magne (FRA)	France	
2	Antonio Pesenti (ITA)	Italy	+ 4' 58"
3	Jef Demuysere (BEL)	Belgium	+ 12' 56"
4			
5			
6			
7			
8			
9			
10			

== Stage 20 ==
22 July 1931 - Belfort to Colmar, 209 km (130 mi)

Stage 20 result

Rank	Rider	Team	Time
1	André Leducq (FRA)	France	7h 05' 53"
2	Charles Pélissier (FRA)	France	s.t.
3	Erich Metze (GER)	Germany	s.t.
4	Hubert Opperman (AUS)	Australia/Switzerland	s.t.
=5	Roger Pipoz (SUI)	Australia/Switzerland	s.t.
=5	Gaston Rebry (BEL)	Belgium	s.t.
=5	Julien Vervaecke (BEL)	Belgium	s.t.
=5	Jef Demuysere (BEL)	Belgium	s.t.
=5	Maurice De Waele (BEL)	Belgium	s.t.
=5	Antonio Pesenti (ITA)	Italy	s.t.

General classification after stage 20

Rank	Rider	Team	Time
1	Antonin Magne (FRA)	France	
2	Antonio Pesenti (ITA)	Italy	+ 4' 58"
3	Jef Demuysere (BEL)	Belgium	+ 12' 56"
4			
5			
6			
7			
8			
9			
10			

== Stage 21 ==
23 July 1931 - Colmar to Metz, 192 km (119 mi)

Stage 21 result

Rank	Rider	Team	Time
1	Raffaele di Paco (ITA)	Italy	6h 20' 00"
2	Kurt Stöpel (GER)	Germany	s.t.
3	Charles Pélissier (FRA)	France	s.t.
4	Max Bulla (AUT)	Touriste-routier	s.t.
5	Maurice De Waele (BEL)	Belgium	s.t.
6	René Bernard (FRA)	Touriste-routier	s.t.
=7	Jef Demuysere (BEL)	Belgium	s.t.
=7	Julien Vervaecke (BEL)	Belgium	s.t.
=7	Alphonse Schepers (BEL)	Belgium	s.t.
=7	Fabio Battesini (ITA)	Italy	s.t.

General classification after stage 21

Rank	Rider	Team	Time
1	Antonin Magne (FRA)	France	
2	Antonio Pesenti (ITA)	Italy	+ 4' 58"
3	Jef Demuysere (BEL)	Belgium	+ 12' 56"
4			
5			
6			
7			
8			
9			
10			

== Stage 22 ==
24 July 1931 - Metz to Charleville, 159 km (99 mi)

Stage 22 result

Rank	Rider	Team	Time
1	Raffaele di Paco (ITA)	Italy	5h 01' 44"
2	Charles Pélissier (FRA)	France	s.t.
3	Kurt Stöpel (GER)	Germany	s.t.
4	Maurice De Waele (BEL)	Belgium	s.t.
5	André Leducq (FRA)	France	s.t.
6	Oskar Thierbach (GER)	Germany	s.t.
=7	Gaston Rebry (BEL)	Belgium	s.t.
=7	Jef Demuysere (BEL)	Belgium	s.t.
=7	Julien Vervaecke (BEL)	Belgium	s.t.
=7	Alphonse Schepers (BEL)	Belgium	s.t.

General classification after stage 22

Rank	Rider	Team	Time
1	Antonin Magne (FRA)	France	
2	Antonio Pesenti (ITA)	Italy	+ 4' 58"
3	Jef Demuysere (BEL)	Belgium	+ 12' 56"
4			
5			
6			
7			
8			
9			
10			

== Stage 23 ==
25 July 1931 - Charleville to Malo-les-Bains, 271 km (168 mi)

Stage 23 result

Rank	Rider	Team	Time
1	Gaston Rebry (BEL)	Belgium	8h 08' 16"
2	Antonin Magne (FRA)	France	+ 11"
3	Jef Demuysere (BEL)	Belgium	s.t.
4	André Leducq (FRA)	France	+ 17' 34"
5	Maurice De Waele (BEL)	Belgium	s.t.
6	Erich Metze (GER)	Germany	s.t.
7	Antonio Pesenti (ITA)	Italy	s.t.
8	Hubert Opperman (AUS)	Australia/Switzerland	s.t.
9	Kurt Stöpel (GER)	Germany	+ 18' 24"
10	Julien Vervaecke (BEL)	Belgium	+ 23' 37"

General classification after stage 23

Rank	Rider	Team	Time
1	Antonin Magne (FRA)	France	
2	Jef Demuysere (BEL)	Belgium	+ 12' 56"
3	Antonio Pesenti (ITA)	Italy	+ 22' 21"
4			
5			
6			
7			
8			
9			
10			

== Stage 24 ==
26 July 1931 - Malo-les-Bains to Paris, 313 km (194 mi)

Stage 24 result

Rank	Rider	Team	Time
1	Charles Pélissier (FRA)	France	13h 15' 38"
2	André Leducq (FRA)	France	s.t.
3	Raffaele di Paco (ITA)	Italy	s.t.
4	Kurt Stöpel (GER)	Germany	s.t.
5	Max Bulla (AUT)	Touriste-routier	s.t.
6	Jules Goedhuys (BEL)	Touriste-routier	s.t.
7	Oskar Thierbach (GER)	Germany	s.t.
=8	Erich Metze (GER)	Germany	s.t.
=8	Jean Maréchal (FRA)	France	s.t.
=8	Antonio Pesenti (ITA)	Italy	s.t.

General classification after stage 24

Rank	Rider	Team	Time
1	Antonin Magne (FRA)	France	177h 10' 03"
2	Jef Demuysere (BEL)	Belgium	+ 12' 56"
3	Antonio Pesenti (ITA)	Italy	+ 22' 51"
4	Gaston Rebry (BEL)	Belgium	+ 46' 40"
5	Maurice De Waele (BEL)	Belgium	+ 49' 46"
6	Julien Vervaecke (BEL)	Belgium	+ 1h 10' 11"
7	Louis Peglion (FRA)	France	+ 1h 18' 33"
8	Erich Metze (GER)	Germany	+ 1h 20' 59"
9	Albert Büchi (SUI)	Australia/Switzerland	+ 1h 29' 29"
10	André Leducq (FRA)	France	+ 1h 30' 08"
