= 1932 Paris–Tours =

Race details
- Dates: 24 April 1932
- Stages: 1
- Distance: 253 km (157.2 mi)
- Winning time: 6h 47' 30"

Results
	Winner	Julien Moineau (FRA)
	Second	Herbert Sieronski (GER)
	Third	Amulio Viarengo (ITA)

The 1932 Paris–Tours was the 27th edition of the Paris–Tours cycle race and was held on 24 April 1932. The race started in Paris and finished in Tours. The race was won by Julien Moineau.

== General classification ==
Final general classification

Rank	Rider	Time
1	Julien Moineau (FRA)	6h 47' 30"
2	Herbert Sieronski (GER)	+ 0"
3	Amulio Viarengo (ITA)	+ 5' 25"
4	Léon Le Calvez (FRA)	+ 5' 25"
5	Jules Merviel (FRA)	+ 5' 36"
6	Yves Le Goff (FRA)	+ 5' 36"
7	Jean Naert (BEL)	+ 6' 48"
8	Gabriel Hargues (FRA)	+ 9' 20"
9	Narcisse Mattuizzi (FRA)	+ 9' 20"
10	Raymond Louviot (FRA)	+ 9' 20"
