= Tour de France records and statistics =

The Tour de France is road cycling's premier competitive event. Since the first event in 1903, one rider has been King of the Mountains, won the combination classification, combativity award, the points competition, and the Tour in the same year - Eddy Merckx in 1969, which was also the first year he participated. The white jersey for the best young (under 25) rider did not exist in 1969; if it had, Merckx would have won that jersey as well.

Only two other riders have approached the feat of winning the green, polka dot and yellow jerseys in the same Tour. Bernard Hinault won the race and the points classification in 1979, but finished second in the mountains competition, while Tadej Pogačar won the race and the mountains competition in 2025, but finished second in the points classification. After Merckx in 1972, no other rider won three separate jerseys in a single Tour, until Tadej Pogačar won the yellow, polka-dot and white jerseys in 2020, a feat he repeated the following year. The white jersey signifies the best young rider and was introduced in 1975.

The Tour has been won on two occasions by a racer who never wore the yellow jersey until the race was over. In 1947, Jean Robic overturned a three-minute deficit on a 257 km final stage into Paris. In 1968, Jan Janssen of the Netherlands secured his win in the individual time trial on the last day.

In addition to 1947 and 1968, in 1989 Greg LeMond overcame a +:50 deficit to Laurent Fignon on the last day of the race in Paris to win the race on the final day, however Lemond had worn the yellow jersey earlier in the race. This was the final time the last stage in Paris was held as an individual time trial.

The Tour has been won four times by a racer who led the general classification on the first stage and held the lead all the way to Paris. Maurice Garin did it during the Tour's first edition, 1903; he repeated the feat the next year, but the results were nullified in response to widespread cheating. Ottavio Bottecchia completed a GC start-to-finish sweep in 1924. In 1928, Nicolas Frantz also led the GC for the entire race, and the final podium was made up of three riders from his Alcyon–Dunlop team. Lastly, Belgian Romain Maes took the lead in the first stage of the 1935 tour, and never gave it away. Similarly, there have been four tours in which a racer has taken over the GC lead on the second stage and held the lead all the way to Paris. After dominating the ITT during Stage 1B of the 1961 Tour de France Jacques Anquetil held the Maillot Jaune from the first day all the way to Paris.

René Pottier, Roger Lapébie, Sylvère Maes, Fausto Coppi and Bradley Wiggins all won the Tour de France the last time they appeared in the race. Of these, only Coppi also won the yellow jersey on their Tour debut.

Mark Cavendish is the all-time leader in individual stage wins with 35.

== Length of stages and Tour ==
- Longest stage: Les Sables-d'Olonne – Bayonne from 1919 to 1924: 482 km (300 mi)
- Longest tour: 1926 – 5,745 km (3,570 mi)
- Shortest tour: 1903 and 1904 – 2,428 km (1,509 mi)

== Participating riders ==
- Largest number of starters: 210 in 1986 (132 classified at the finish)
- Smallest number of starters: 59 in 1903 (21 classified at the finish).
- Highest number of finishers: 174 in 2016 (198 starters).
- Smallest number of finishers: 10 in 1919 (67 starters).
- Largest number of riders leaving the race: 93 in 1998 (96 classified at the finish out of 189 starters)

== Appearances ==
Between 1920 and 1985, Jules Deloffre (1885 – 1963) was the record holder for the highest number of Tour de France participations, with 14, and was sole holder of this record until 1966 with the fourteenth and last participation of André Darrigade. The record for most appearances is now held by Sylvain Chavanel, with 18. George Hincapie had held the mark for the most consecutive finishes with sixteen, having completed every Tour de France that he participated in except his first one, but was disqualified in October 2012 from the 2004, 2005 and 2006 editions of the race for his use of performance-enhancing drugs. Joop Zoetemelk and Chavanel jointly hold the record for the most finishes with sixteen each, with the former having completed all 16 of the Tours that he started. Zoetemelk also held the record for the most Tour de France stages completed with 365, a tally that was surpassed when Chavanel finished Stage 18 of the 2018 edition of the Tour. Chavanel's record now stands at 369. Zoetemelk currently holds the record for most kilometers ridden in Tour de France history at 62,885, a record which will be difficult to break considering the shorter stage lengths in modern Tours. Of the riders on this list only Van Impe (1976), Zoetemelk (1980) and Geraint Thomas (2018) have won the race. Riders who are still active are indicated in bold.

Most appearances
Participations	Finishes	Name	Nationality
18 (2001–2018)	16 (2001–2006, 2008–2011, 2013–2018)	Sylvain Chavanel	France
17 (1997–2013)	15 (1997–1999, 2001–2006, 2008–2013)	Stuart O'Grady	Australia
17 (1998–2014)	14 (1998–2002, 2004, 2006–2008, 2010–2014)	Jens Voigt	Germany
17 (1996–2012)	13 (1997–2003, 2007–2012) (Note: All appearances from 2004 to 2006 have been disqualified due to Hincapie's suspension for performance-enhancing drug use)	George Hincapie	United States
16 (1970–1973, 1975–1986)	16 (1970–1973, 1975–1986)	Joop Zoetemelk	Netherlands
16 (2001–2009, 2011–2017)	15 (2001–2003, 2005–2009, 2011–2017)	Haimar Zubeldia	Spain
15 (2007–2018, 2021, 2023–2024)	8 (2009–2013, 2015, 2021, 2024)	Mark Cavendish	United Kingdom
15 (1969–1981, 1983, 1985)	15 (1969–1981, 1983, 1985)	Lucien Van Impe	Belgium
15 (1990–1998, 2000–2004, 2006)	15 (1990–1998, 2000–2004, 2006)	Viatcheslav Ekimov	Russia
15 (2003–2017)	15 (2003–2017)	Thomas Voeckler	France
15 (1980–1994)	13 (1981–1982, 1984–1994)	Guy Nulens	Belgium
15 (1996–2010)	11 (1996–1997, 1999–2000, 2003–2007, 2009–2010)	Christophe Moreau	France
14 (1953–1966)	13 (1953–1962, 1964–1966)	André Darrigade	France
14 (1994–2004, 2006–2008)	13 (1995–2004, 2006–2008)	Erik Zabel	Germany
14 (2007, 2010–2011, 2013–2019, 2021–2022, 2024–2025)	13 (2007, 2010–2011, 2013–2016, 2018–2019, 2021–2022, 2024–2025)	Geraint Thomas	United Kingdom
14 (1978–1985, 1987–1992)	12 (1978–1985, 1988–1990, 1992)	Sean Kelly	Ireland
14 (1962–1976)	11 (1962–1965, 1967, 1969–1972, 1974–1976)	Raymond Poulidor	France
14 (2005–2008, 2012–2021)	10 (2007–2008, 2012–2016, 2018–2020)	Alejandro Valverde	Spain
14 (1908–1914, 1920–1928)	7 (1909–1914, 1921)	Jules Deloffre	France
13 (1981–1988, 1989–1994)	13 (1981–1988, 1989–1994)	Phil Anderson	Australia
13 (1969–1975, 1977–1981, 1983)	12 (1969–1975, 1977–1980, 1983)	Joaquim Agostinho	Portugal
13 (1974–1982, 1984, 1986–1988)	11 (1974–1975, 1977–1982, 1984, 1986–1987)	Gerrie Knetemann	Netherlands
13 (1977–1989)	11 (1977–1985, 1987, 1989)	Henk Lubberding	Netherlands
13 (1951–1963)	10 (1951–1952, 1954, 1956–1957, 1959–1963)	Jean Dotto	France
13 (1964–1976)	10 (1964–1965, 1967–1971, 1973–1974, 1976)	Jean-Pierre Genet	France
13 (1953–1965)	9 (1953–1955, 1957, 1959–1960, 1962–1963, 1965)	François Mahé	France
13 (1979–1983, 1985–1988, 1990–1993)	9 (1979, 1981–1983, 1985, 1987–1988, 1990–1991)	Gilbert Duclos-Lassalle	France
13 (2002–2014)	13 (2002–2014)	Jérôme Pineau	France
13 (1992–1997, 1999–2005)	8 (1993–1994, 1996, 2000, 2002–2005)	Marc Wauters	Belgium
13 (1994–2006)	7 (1995, 1997, 2000–2001, 2003, 2005–2006)	Didier Rous	France
13 (1993–1996, 1999–2005, 2009–2010)	1 (1995) (Note: All appearances since August 1, 1998 have been disqualified due to Armstrong's suspension for performance-enhancing drug use)	Lance Armstrong	United States
13 (2009–2021)	7 (2009–2011, 2013–2014, 2017, 2020)	Tony Martin	Germany
13 (2010–2022)	11 (2010–2011, 2013–2021)	Imanol Erviti	Spain
13 (2009–2018, 2020–2022)	13 (2009–2018, 2020–2022)	Pierre Rolland	France
13 (2010–2013, 2015–2023)	11 (2010–2012, 2015–2020, 2022–2023)	Edvald Boasson Hagen	Norway

== Smallest winning margin ==
In the early years of the Tour, cyclists rode individually, and were sometimes forbidden from riding together. This led to large gaps between the winner and the runner-up. Since the cyclists now tend to stay together in a peloton, the margins of the winner have become smaller, as the difference usually originates from time trials, breakaways or on mountain top finishes, or from being dropped by the peloton. In the table below, the ten smallest margins between the winner and the second placed cyclists at the end of the Tour are listed, all of them under one minute. The largest margin, by comparison, remains that of the first Tour in 1903: 2h 49m 45s between Maurice Garin and Lucien Pothier.

Cadel Evans is on this list twice, losing the 2007 and 2008 races by less than a minute; and he is just off this list for the 2011 edition, which he won by overturning a deficit during the final time trial claiming the victory by just 1:34 over Andy Schleck. The smallest margins between first and second placed riders are as follows.

Smallest winning margin
Rank	Margin	Year	Winner	Runner-up
1	8"	1989	(United States) Greg LeMond	(France) Laurent Fignon
2	23"	2007	(Spain) Alberto Contador	(Australia) Cadel Evans
3	32"	2006	(Spain) Óscar Pereiro	(Germany) Andreas Klöden
4	38"	1968	(Netherlands) Jan Janssen	(Belgium) Herman Van Springel
5	40"	1987	(Republic of Ireland) Stephen Roche	(Spain) Pedro Delgado
6	48"	1977	(France) Bernard Thévenet	(Netherlands) Hennie Kuiper
7	54"	2017	(United Kingdom) Chris Froome	(Colombia) Rigoberto Urán
8	55"	1964	(France) Jacques Anquetil	(France) Raymond Poulidor
9	58"	2008	(Spain) Carlos Sastre	(Australia) Cadel Evans
10	59"	2020	(Slovenia) Tadej Pogačar	(Slovenia) Primož Roglič

== Successful breakaways ==
The longest successful post-war breakaway by a single rider was by Albert Bourlon in the 1947 Tour de France. In the stage Carcassonne-Luchon, he stayed away for 253 kilometres (157 mi). It was one of seven breakaways longer than 200 km, the last being Thierry Marie's 234 km escape in 1991. Bourlon finished 16:30 ahead. This is one of the biggest time gaps but not the greatest. That record belongs to José Luis Viejo, who beat the peloton by 22:50 in the 1976 stage Montgenèvre-Manosque. He was the fourth and most recent rider to win a stage by more than 20 minutes. Another major solo effort was Fons de Wolf during stage 14 of the 1984 Tour de France. He won the stage by 17:40 and came within a minute and a half of Tour favorite Laurent Fignon in the overall standings. He paid for his solo effort in the following stages, however, and fell back in the standings thereafter.

== Overall speed ==
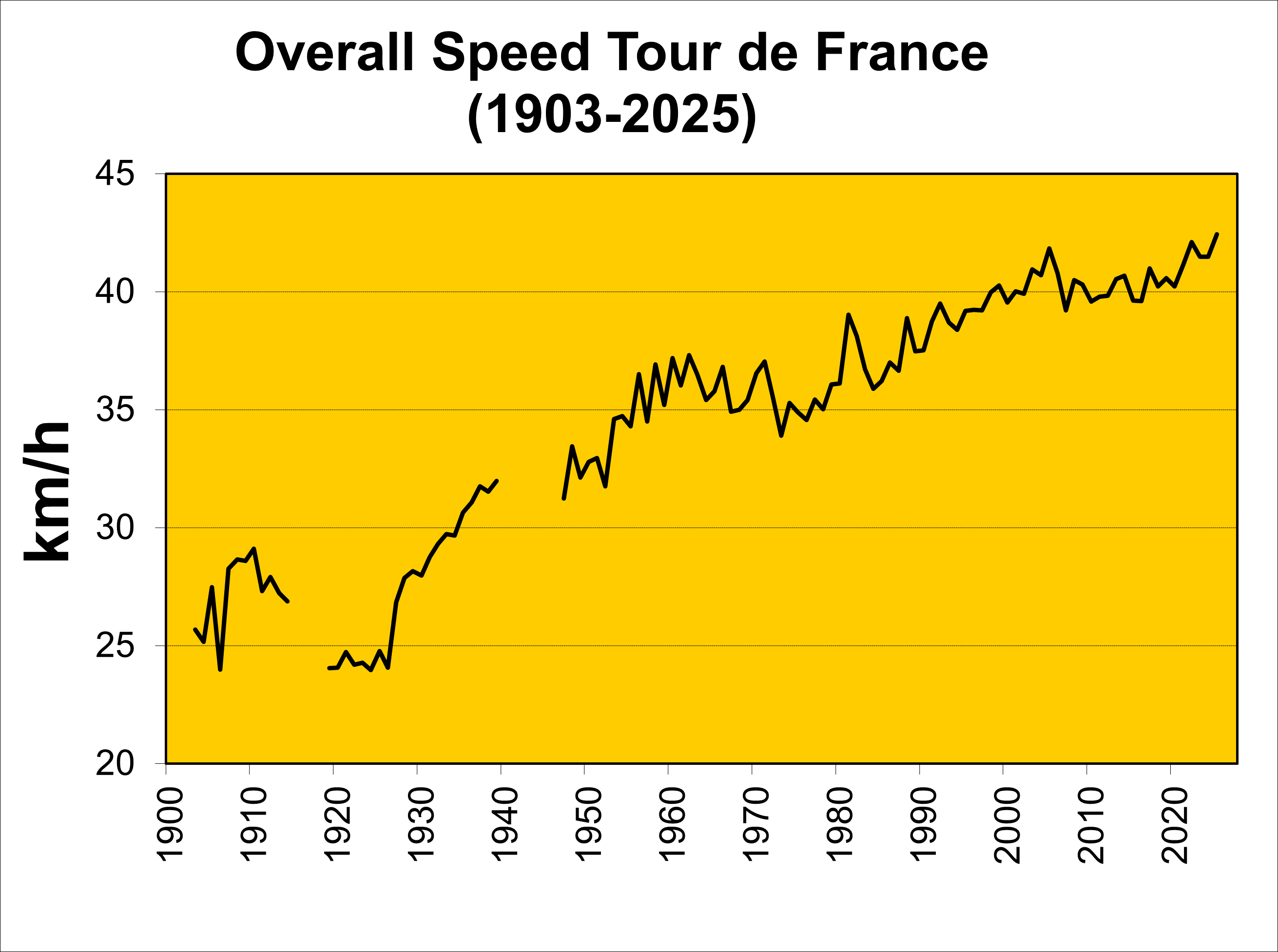
Overall Speed of the Tour de France

The 2025 edition was the fastest Tour de France in history. Tadej Pogačar rode 3,302 km in 76h 00m 32s, thus realising an overall speed of 43.4 km/h or 27.0 mph.

Every year we say 'it is the hardest Tour ever, the hardest thing we have ever done'. It is all so crazy but, honestly, I know that this year was something on another level.

— Tadej Pogacar, on Tour de France 2025

The slowest Tour de France was the edition of 1919, when Firmin Lambot's average speed was 24.1 km/h.

=== Recent overall speeds ===
Overall Speed
Year	Winners' Average Speed
2016	39.616 km/h
2017	40.997 km/h
2018	40.210 km/h
2019	40.576 km/h
2020	39.872 km/h
2021	41.165 km/h
2022	42.031 km/h
2023	41.431 km/h
2024	41.818 km/h
2025	43.440 km/h
2026	43.326 km/h

== Stage speeds ==
The fastest massed-start stage was stage 11 of the 2026 Tour de France from Vichy to Nevers (161.3 km (100.2 mi)), which was won by Søren Wærenskjold at an average of 50.9 km/h (31.6 mph). A four man break away was established after 11 kilometres, though the gap never extended beyond 1 minute 40 seconds. The break was caught 6.7km from the finish with Wærenskjold's victory coming from a bunch sprint, with 119 riders being awarded the same time. Søren Wærenskjold has the rare honour of coming in last position then first position in consecutive tour stages, having suffered a crash on stage 10.

The previous fastest massed-start stage was the flat stage 4 of the 1999 Tour de France from Laval to Blois (194.5 km (120.9 mi)), which was won by Mario Cipollini at an average of 50.4 km/h (31.3 mph).

The fastest individual time-trial is Rohan Dennis's stage 1 of the 2015 Tour de France in Utrecht, won at an average pace of 55.446 km/h (34.5 mph).

The fastest team time-trial stage and fastest stage win was by the Orica GreenEDGE team in Stage 4 of the 2013 Tour de France. They completed the 25 km time-trial at 57.7 km/h (35.85 mph).

The fastest climb of Alpe d'Huez was by Tadej Pogacar at the 2026 Tour de France with a time of 35 minutes and 27 seconds.

== Stage wins per rider ==
The table below shows the top 26 riders who have won the most stages (including half-stages, excluding Team Time Trials). Riders who are still active are indicated in bold. Riders with the same number of stage wins are listed alphabetically.

Rank	Name	Country (Note: Country Represented (Not necessarily country of birth or nationality))	Wins	First win	Last win
1	Mark Cavendish	Great Britain	35	2008	2024
2	Eddy Merckx	Belgium	34	1969	1975
3	Bernard Hinault	France	28	1978	1986
4	**Tadej Pogačar**	Slovenia	26	2020	2026
5	André Leducq	France	25	1927	1938
6	André Darrigade	France	22	1953	1964
7	Nicolas Frantz	Luxembourg	20	1924	1929
8	François Faber	Luxembourg	19	1908	1914
9	Jean Alavoine	France	17	1909	1923
10	Jacques Anquetil	France	16	1957	1964
10	René Le Grevès	France	16	1933	1939
10	Charles Pélissier	France	16	1929	1935
13	Freddy Maertens	Belgium	15	1976	1981
14	Marcel Kittel	Germany	14	2013	2017
15	Philippe Thys	Belgium	13	1913	1924
15	Louis Trousselier	France	13	1905	1910
17	Jean Aerts	Belgium	12	1930	1935
17	Gino Bartali	Italy	12	1937	1950
17	Mario Cipollini	Italy	12	1993	1999
17	Miguel Indurain	Spain	12	1989	1995
17	Robbie McEwen	Australia	12	1999	2007
17	Peter Sagan	Slovakia	12	2012	2019
17	Erik Zabel	Germany	12	1995	2002
24	Louison Bobet	France	11	1948	1955
24	Raffaele Di Paco	Italy	11	1931	1935
24	André Greipel	Germany	11	2011	2016
24	**Jasper Philipsen**	Belgium	11	2022	2026

Three riders have won 8 stages in a single year:

- Charles Pélissier (FRA) (1930, in addition to seven 2nd and three 3rd places)
- Eddy Merckx (BEL) (1970, 1974)
- Freddy Maertens (BEL) (1976, in addition to four 2nd and two 3rd places)

Mark Cavendish has the most mass finish stage wins with 35 ahead of André Darrigade and André Leducq with 22, François Faber with 19 and Eddy Merckx with 18.

The youngest Tour de France stage winner is Fabio Battesini, who was 19 when he won stage 3 in the 1931 Tour de France. The oldest Tour de France stage winner is Pino Cerami, who won stage 9 of the 1963 edition at 41 years old.

== Riders who have won stages in all three specialties ==
These riders have won mountain, sprint, and individual time trial stages in a single Tour.

Rider	Country	Year
Eddy Merckx	Belgium	1974
Bernard Hinault	France	1979
Wout van Aert	Belgium	2021

== Stage wins per country ==
Riders representing 35 countries have won at least one stage in the Tour de France. Apart from 1926, 1999 and 2026, every edition of the Tour de France has had at least one stage won by a French rider (updated: 25 July 2026).

Country	#
France	717
Belgium	509
Italy	273
Netherlands	190
Spain	131
Germany	90
Great Britain	79
Luxembourg	71
Switzerland	62

Country	#
Australia	40
Slovenia	32
Denmark	30
Colombia	22
Norway	21
United States	19
Ireland	15
Slovakia	13
Portugal	12

Country	#
Russia	11
Uzbekistan	9
Poland	7
Kazakhstan	6
Austria	6
Estonia	4
Ukraine	4
Czech Republic	3
Canada	3

Country	#
Eritrea	3
Mexico	3
Ecuador	3
Latvia	2
South Africa	2
Brazil	1
Lithuania	1
Sweden	1

=== Detailed table ===
Year	(France)	(Belgium)	(Italy)	(Netherlands)	(Spain)	(Germany)	(United Kingdom)	(Luxembourg)	(Switzerland)	(Australia)	(Slovenia)	(Denmark)	(Colombia)	(Norway)	(United States)	(Republic of Ireland)	(Slovakia)	(Portugal)	(Russia)	(Uzbekistan)	(Kazakhstan)	(Poland)	(Austria)	(Estonia)	(Ukraine)	(Czech Republic)	(Canada)	(Mexico)	(Ecuador)	(Eritrea)	(Latvia)	(South Africa)	(Brazil)	(Lithuania)	(Sweden)
1903	5	-	-	-	-	-	-	-	1	-	-	-	-	-	-	-	-	-	-	-	-	-	-	-	-	-	-	-	-	-	-	-	-	-	-
1904	5	-	-	-	-	-	-	-	1	-	-	-	-	-	-	-	-	-	-	-	-	-	-	-	-	-	-	-	-	-	-	-	-	-	-
1905	11	-	-	-	-	-	-	-	-	-	-	-	-	-	-	-	-	-	-	-	-	-	-	-	-	-	-	-	-	-	-	-	-	-	-
1906	13	-	-	-	-	-	-	-	-	-	-	-	-	-	-	-	-	-	-	-	-	-	-	-	-	-	-	-	-	-	-	-	-	-	-
1907	14	-	-	-	-	-	-	-	-	-	-	-	-	-	-	-	-	-	-	-	-	-	-	-	-	-	-	-	-	-	-	-	-	-	-
1908	10	-	-	-	-	-	-	4	-	-	-	-	-	-	-	-	-	-	-	-	-	-	-	-	-	-	-	-	-	-	-	-	-	-	-
1909	7	1	-	-	-	-	-	6	-	-	-	-	-	-	-	-	-	-	-	-	-	-	-	-	-	-	-	-	-	-	-	-	-	-	-
1910	11	-	1	-	-	-	-	3	-	-	-	-	-	-	-	-	-	-	-	-	-	-	-	-	-	-	-	-	-	-	-	-	-	-	-
1911	12	1	-	-	-	-	-	2	-	-	-	-	-	-	-	-	-	-	-	-	-	-	-	-	-	-	-	-	-	-	-	-	-	-	-
1912	8	5	2	-	-	-	-	-	-	-	-	-	-	-	-	-	-	-	-	-	-	-	-	-	-	-	-	-	-	-	-	-	-	-	-
1913	2	10	1	-	-	-	-	2	-	-	-	-	-	-	-	-	-	-	-	-	-	-	-	-	-	-	-	-	-	-	-	-	-	-	-
1914	7	4	-	-	-	-	-	2	2	-	-	-	-	-	-	-	-	-	-	-	-	-	-	-	-	-	-	-	-	-	-	-	-	-	-
1919	11	2	2	-	-	-	-	-	-	-	-	-	-	-	-	-	-	-	-	-	-	-	-	-	-	-	-	-	-	-	-	-	-	-	-
1920	3	12	-	-	-	-	-	-	-	-	-	-	-	-	-	-	-	-	-	-	-	-	-	-	-	-	-	-	-	-	-	-	-	-	-
1921	5	9	1	-	-	-	-	-	-	-	-	-	-	-	-	-	-	-	-	-	-	-	-	-	-	-	-	-	-	-	-	-	-	-	-
1922	6	8	1	-	-	-	-	-	-	-	-	-	-	-	-	-	-	-	-	-	-	-	-	-	-	-	-	-	-	-	-	-	-	-	-
1923	12	2	1	-	-	-	-	-	-	-	-	-	-	-	-	-	-	-	-	-	-	-	-	-	-	-	-	-	-	-	-	-	-	-	-
1924	4	4	5	-	-	-	-	2	-	-	-	-	-	-	-	-	-	-	-	-	-	-	-	-	-	-	-	-	-	-	-	-	-	-	-
1925	1	8	5	-	-	-	-	4	-	-	-	-	-	-	-	-	-	-	-	-	-	-	-	-	-	-	-	-	-	-	-	-	-	-	-
1926	-	12	1	-	-	-	-	4	-	-	-	-	-	-	-	-	-	-	-	-	-	-	-	-	-	-	-	-	-	-	-	-	-	-	-
1927	6	15	-	-	-	-	-	3	-	-	-	-	-	-	-	-	-	-	-	-	-	-	-	-	-	-	-	-	-	-	-	-	-	-	-
1928	13	4	-	-	-	-	-	5	-	-	-	-	-	-	-	-	-	-	-	-	-	-	-	-	-	-	-	-	-	-	-	-	-	-	-
1929	10	9	-	-	1	-	-	2	-	-	-	-	-	-	-	-	-	-	-	-	-	-	-	-	-	-	-	-	-	-	-	-	-	-	-
1930	13	3	5	-	-	-	-	-	-	-	-	-	-	-	-	-	-	-	-	-	-	-	-	-	-	-	-	-	-	-	-	-	-	-	-
1931	8	6	7	-	-	-	-	-	-	-	-	-	-	-	-	-	-	-	-	-	-	-	3	-	-	-	-	-	-	-	-	-	-	-	-
1932	7	6	7	-	-	1	-	-	-	-	-	-	-	-	-	-	-	-	-	-	-	-	-	-	-	-	-	-	-	-	-	-	-	-	-
1933	9	9	5	-	-	-	-	-	-	-	-	-	-	-	-	-	-	-	-	-	-	-	-	-	-	-	-	-	-	-	-	-	-	-	-
1934	20	1	3	-	-	-	-	-	-	-	-	-	-	-	-	-	-	-	-	-	-	-	-	-	-	-	-	-	-	-	-	-	-	-	-
1935	13	8	6	-	-	-	-	-	-	-	-	-	-	-	-	-	-	-	-	-	-	-	-	-	-	-	-	-	-	-	-	-	-	-	-
1936	13	9	-	1	1	-	-	2	1	-	-	-	-	-	-	-	-	-	-	-	-	-	-	-	-	-	-	-	-	-	-	-	-	-	-
1937	9	10	3	-	2	4	-	1	3	-	-	-	-	-	-	-	-	-	-	-	-	-	-	-	-	-	-	-	-	-	-	-	-	-	-
1938	8	11	5	3	-	1	-	1	-	-	-	-	-	-	-	-	-	-	-	-	-	-	-	-	-	-	-	-	-	-	-	-	-	-	-
1939	17	7	-	1	-	-	-	2	1	-	-	-	-	-	-	-	-	-	-	-	-	-	-	-	-	-	-	-	-	-	-	-	-	-	-
1947	12	2	4	-	-	-	-	-	3	-	-	-	-	-	-	-	-	-	-	-	-	-	-	-	-	-	-	-	-	-	-	-	-	-	-
1948	6	4	11	-	-	-	-	-	-	-	-	-	-	-	-	-	-	-	-	-	-	-	-	-	-	-	-	-	-	-	-	-	-	-	-
1949	8	5	6	-	-	-	-	1	1	-	-	-	-	-	-	-	-	-	-	-	-	-	-	-	-	-	-	-	-	-	-	-	-	-	-
1950	9	2	6	-	-	-	-	2	3	-	-	-	-	-	-	-	-	-	-	-	-	-	-	-	-	-	-	-	-	-	-	-	-	-	-
1951	6	4	5	1	2	-	-	1	6	-	-	-	-	-	-	-	-	-	-	-	-	-	-	-	-	-	-	-	-	-	-	-	-	-	-
1952	9	3	7	2	-	-	-	1	1	-	-	-	-	-	-	-	-	-	-	-	-	-	-	-	-	-	-	-	-	-	-	-	-	-	-
1953	10	1	3	5	1	-	-	-	2	-	-	-	-	-	-	-	-	-	-	-	-	-	-	-	-	-	-	-	-	-	-	-	-	-	-
1954	15	4	-	3	-	-	-	-	3	-	-	-	-	-	-	-	-	-	-	-	-	-	-	-	-	-	-	-	-	-	-	-	-	-	-
1955	9	3	2	4	2	-	-	3	-	-	-	-	-	-	-	-	-	-	-	-	-	-	-	-	-	-	-	-	-	-	-	-	-	-	-
1956	8	4	6	-	2	-	-	3	-	-	-	-	-	-	-	-	-	-	-	-	-	-	-	-	-	-	-	-	-	-	-	-	-	-	-
1957	17	1	6	-	-	-	-	-	-	-	-	-	-	-	-	-	-	-	-	-	-	-	-	-	-	-	-	-	-	-	-	-	-	-	-
1958	9	2	5	1	2	-	1	4	-	-	-	-	-	-	-	-	-	-	-	-	-	-	-	-	-	-	-	-	-	-	-	-	-	-	-
1959	12	1	4	-	1	-	1	1	2	-	-	-	-	-	-	-	-	-	-	-	-	-	-	-	-	-	-	-	-	-	-	-	-	-	-
1960	10	5	4	-	-	-	-	-	2	-	-	-	-	-	-	-	-	-	-	-	-	-	-	-	-	-	-	-	-	-	-	-	-	-	-
1961	12	6	3	-	-	-	-	1	-	-	-	-	-	-	-	-	-	-	-	-	-	-	-	-	-	-	-	-	-	-	-	-	-	-	-
1962	7	8	4	1	1	3	-	-	-	-	-	-	-	-	-	-	-	-	-	-	-	-	-	-	-	-	-	-	-	-	-	-	-	-	-
1963	8	10	1	1	2	-	-	-	-	-	-	-	-	-	-	1	-	-	-	-	-	-	-	-	-	-	-	-	-	-	-	-	-	-	-
1964	8	7	-	4	5	1	-	-	-	-	-	-	-	-	-	-	-	-	-	-	-	-	-	-	-	-	-	-	-	-	-	-	-	-	-
1965	3	7	5	4	4	-	1	-	-	-	-	-	-	-	-	-	-	-	-	-	-	-	-	-	-	-	-	-	-	-	-	-	-	-	-
1966	2	8	4	5	2	3	-	1	-	-	-	-	-	-	-	-	-	-	-	-	-	-	-	-	-	-	-	-	-	-	-	-	-	-	-
1967	8	6	4	1	2	1	2	-	1	-	-	-	-	-	-	-	-	-	-	-	-	-	-	-	-	-	-	-	-	-	-	-	-	-	-
1968	10	10	2	2	1	-	1	-	-	-	-	-	-	-	-	-	-	-	-	-	-	-	-	-	-	-	-	-	-	-	-	-	-	-	-
1969	3	14	3	-	1	1	2	-	-	-	-	-	-	-	-	-	-	2	-	-	-	-	-	-	-	-	-	-	-	-	-	-	-	-	-
1970	5	14	5	1	2	1	-	-	-	-	-	1	-	-	-	-	-	-	-	-	-	-	-	-	-	-	-	-	-	-	-	-	-	-	-
1971	4	11	3	3	4	-	-	-	-	-	-	-	-	-	-	-	-	-	-	-	-	-	-	-	-	-	-	-	-	-	-	-	-	-	-
1972	7	15	1	2	-	-	-	-	-	-	-	-	-	-	-	-	-	-	-	-	-	-	-	-	-	-	-	-	-	-	-	-	-	-	-
1973	6	7	-	2	8	-	3	-	-	-	-	-	-	-	-	-	-	1	-	-	-	-	-	-	-	-	-	-	-	-	-	-	-	-	-
1974	7	15	1	2	1	-	1	-	-	-	-	-	-	-	-	-	-	-	-	-	-	-	-	-	-	-	-	-	-	-	-	-	-	-	-
1975	3	11	4	5	1	-	1	-	-	-	-	-	-	-	-	-	-	-	-	-	-	-	-	-	-	-	-	-	-	-	-	-	-	-	-
1976	3	12	3	7	2	-	-	-	-	-	-	-	-	-	-	-	-	-	-	-	-	-	-	-	-	-	-	-	-	-	-	-	-	-	-
1977	8	6	1	5	1	6	-	-	-	-	-	-	-	-	-	-	-	-	-	-	-	-	-	-	-	-	-	-	-	-	-	-	-	-	-
1978	7	5	-	9	1	1	-	-	-	-	-	-	-	-	-	1	-	-	-	-	-	-	-	-	-	-	-	-	-	-	-	-	-	-	-
1979	10	4	1	8	-	1	-	-	-	-	-	-	-	-	-	-	-	1	-	-	-	-	-	-	-	-	-	-	-	-	-	-	-	-	-
1980	7	4	-	11	-	-	-	-	-	-	-	-	-	-	-	2	-	-	-	-	-	-	-	-	-	-	-	-	-	-	-	-	-	-	-
1981	6	10	-	7	-	-	-	-	1	-	-	-	-	-	-	1	-	-	-	-	-	-	-	-	-	-	-	-	-	-	-	-	-	-	-
1982	6	5	-	6	-	-	-	-	3	1	-	-	-	-	-	1	-	-	-	-	-	-	-	-	-	-	-	-	-	-	-	-	-	-	-
1983	9	3	1	5	1	-	1	-	2	-	-	1	-	-	-	-	-	-	-	-	-	-	-	-	-	-	-	-	-	-	-	-	-	-	-
1984	12	7	-	1	1	-	1	-	-	-	-	-	1	-	-	-	-	1	-	-	-	-	-	-	-	-	-	-	-	-	-	-	-	-	-
1985	6	6	-	4	2	-	-	-	-	-	-	1	3	-	1	1	-	-	-	-	-	-	-	-	-	-	-	-	-	-	-	-	-	-	-
1986	6	5	3	1	5	-	-	-	2	-	-	-	1	-	2	-	-	-	-	-	-	-	-	-	-	-	-	-	-	-	-	-	-	-	-
1987	7	2	1	6	4	1	-	-	-	-	-	-	-	1	2	1	-	1	-	-	-	-	-	-	-	-	-	-	-	-	-	-	-	-	-
1988	2	-	4	8	3	1	1	-	1	-	-	1	1	-	-	-	-	1	-	-	-	-	-	-	-	-	1	-	-	-	-	-	-	-	-
1989	4	1	2	6	1	-	1	-	1	-	-	-	-	-	3	1	-	1	-	-	-	-	-	-	-	-	-	1	-	-	-	-	-	-	-
1990	3	2	5	6	3	1	-	-	-	-	-	-	-	-	-	-	-	-	1	-	-	-	-	-	-	-	-	1	-	-	-	-	-	-	-
1991	5	1	6	2	2	-	-	-	-	1	-	-	-	-	-	-	-	-	3	2	-	-	-	-	-	-	-	-	-	-	-	-	1	-	-
1992	6	2	3	3	4	1	-	-	1	-	-	-	-	-	1	1	-	-	-	-	-	-	-	-	-	-	-	-	-	-	-	-	-	-	-
1993	1	2	4	-	2	1	-	-	3	-	-	2	1	-	1	-	-	-	-	3	-	1	-	-	-	-	-	-	-	-	-	-	-	-	-
1994	4	-	5	1	2	-	1	-	-	-	-	3	-	-	-	-	1	-	-	2	-	-	-	-	-	-	-	-	-	-	2	-	-	-	-
1995	3	1	6	1	2	2	1	-	1	-	-	-	-	-	1	-	-	-	-	1	-	-	-	-	1	-	-	-	-	-	-	-	-	-	-
1996	4	-	3	3	-	3	-	-	3	-	-	3	1	-	-	-	-	-	1	1	-	-	-	-	-	-	-	-	-	-	-	-	-	-	-
1997	6	-	7	1	1	5	1	-	-	1	-	-	-	-	-	-	-	-	-	-	-	-	-	-	-	-	-	-	-	-	-	-	-	-	-
1998	1	4	6	2	-	4	1	-	-	1	-	-	-	-	-	-	-	-	-	-	-	-	-	-	-	1	-	-	-	-	-	-	-	-	1
1999	-	4	7	-	3	-	-	-	-	1	-	-	-	-	-	-	-	-	1	-	-	-	-	1	-	-	-	-	-	-	-	-	-	-	-
2000	2	2	5	4	3	2	1	-	-	-	-	-	1	-	-	-	-	-	-	-	-	-	-	-	-	-	-	-	-	-	-	-	-	-	-
2001	4	3	-	1	1	4	-	-	-	-	-	-	1	-	-	-	-	-	1	-	-	-	-	1	-	1	-	-	-	-	-	-	-	-	-
2002	2	-	1	2	2	1	1	-	1	3	-	-	2	1	-	-	-	-	-	-	-	-	-	1	-	-	-	-	-	-	-	-	-	-	-
2003	2	-	5	1	4	1	1	-	-	2	-	1	-	-	2	-	-	-	-	-	1	-	-	-	-	-	-	-	-	-	-	-	-	-	-
2004	3	2	2	-	2	-	-	-	1	3	-	-	-	1	1	-	-	-	-	-	-	-	-	1	-	-	-	-	-	-	-	-	-	-	-
2005	1	2	3	1	3	-	-	-	-	3	-	1	-	-	1	-	-	-	-	-	2	-	1	-	-	-	-	-	-	-	-	-	-	-	-
2006	3	-	1	-	4	2	-	1	-	3	-	1	-	2	-	-	-	-	1	-	-	-	-	-	3	-	-	-	-	-	-	-	-	-	-
2007	2	3	3	-	1	1	-	1	2	2	-	2	1	1	-	-	-	-	-	-	-	-	-	-	-	-	-	-	-	-	-	1	-	-	-
2008	3	1	-	-	6	1	4	1	1	1	-	-	-	2	-	-	-	-	1	-	-	-	-	-	-	-	-	-	-	-	-	-	-	-	-
2009	4	-	-	-	4	1	6	1	1	-	-	1	-	1	-	-	-	-	1	-	1	-	-	-	-	-	-	-	-	-	-	-	-	-	-
2010	6	-	2	-	1	-	5	2	2	-	-	-	-	1	-	-	-	1	-	-	1	-	-	-	-	-	-	-	-	-	-	-	-	-	-
2011	1	2	-	-	2	2	5	1	-	1	-	-	-	4	2	-	-	1	-	-	-	-	-	-	-	-	-	-	-	-	-	-	-	-	-
2012	5	-	-	-	2	3	7	-	1	-	-	-	-	-	-	-	3	-	-	-	-	-	-	-	-	-	-	-	-	-	-	-	-	-	-
2013	1	1	1	-	-	6	5	-	-	1	-	-	1	-	-	1	1	2	-	-	-	-	-	-	-	-	-	-	-	-	-	-	-	-	-
2014	2	-	5	1	-	7	-	-	-	1	-	-	-	2	-	-	-	-	-	-	-	2	-	-	-	-	-	-	-	-	-	-	-	1	-
2015	3	1	1	-	3	6	3	-	-	1	-	-	-	-	1	-	-	-	-	-	-	1	-	-	-	1	-	-	-	-	-	-	-	-	-
2016	1	2	-	2	1	2	7	-	-	1	-	-	1	-	-	-	3	-	1	-	-	-	-	-	-	-	-	-	-	-	-	-	-	-	-
2017	5	-	1	2	-	5	1	-	-	2	1	-	1	1	-	-	1	-	-	-	-	1	-	-	-	-	-	-	-	-	-	-	-	-	-
2018	3	-	-	3	1	1	2	-	-	-	1	1	3	1	-	1	3	-	-	-	-	-	-	-	-	-	-	-	-	-	-	-	-	-	-
2019	3	3	3	3	-	-	2	-	-	3	-	-	1	-	-	-	1	-	-	-	-	-	-	-	-	-	-	-	-	-	-	1	-	-	-
2020	2	2	-	-	-	1	-	-	1	2	4	2	2	1	-	2	-	-	-	-	1	1	-	-	-	-	-	-	-	-	-	-	-	-	-
2021	1	5	-	2	-	1	4	-	-	1	5	-	-	-	1	-	-	-	-	-	-	-	1	-	-	-	-	-	-	-	-	-	-	-	-
2022	1	6	-	2	-	-	1	1	-	2	3	4	-	-	-	-	-	-	-	-	-	-	-	-	-	-	1	-	-	-	-	-	-	-	-
2023	1	5	-	1	3	-	1	-	-	1	3	3	-	-	-	-	-	-	-	-	-	1	1	-	-	-	1	-	-	-	-	-	-	-	-
2024	3	5	-	1	-	-	1	-	-	-	6	1	-	-	-	-	-	-	-	-	-	-	-	-	-	-	-	-	1	3	-	-	-	-	-
2025	1	6	2	3	-	-	1	-	-	2	4	-	-	1	-	1	-	-	-	-	-	-	-	-	-	-	-	-	-	-	-	-	-	-	-
2026	-	6	-	4	-	-	-	-	1	-	5	1	-	1	-	-	-	-	-	-	-	-	-	-	-	-	-	1	2	-	-	-	-	-	-
TOTAL	717	509	273	190	131	90	79	71	62	40	32	30	22	21	19	15	13	12	11	9	6	7	6	4	4	3	3	3	3	3	2	2	1	1	1
	(France)	(Belgium)	(Italy)	(Netherlands)	(Spain)	(Germany)	(United Kingdom)	(Luxembourg)	(Switzerland)	(Australia)	(Slovenia)	(Denmark)	(Colombia)	(Norway)	(United States)	(Republic of Ireland)	(Slovakia)	(Portugal)	(Russia)	(Uzbekistan)	(Kazakhstan)	(Poland)	(Austria)	(Estonia)	(Ukraine)	(Czech Republic)	(Canada)	(Mexico)	(Ecuador)	(Eritrea)	(Latvia)	(South Africa)	(Brazil)	(Lithuania)	(Sweden)

== Stage podiums per rider ==
The table below shows the top 26 riders with the most podium finishes (including half-stages, excluding Team Time Trials). Riders who are still active are indicated in bold.

Rank	Name	Country (Note: Country Represented (Not necessarily country of birth or nationality))	Podiums	1st-2nd-3rd	First podium	Last podium
1	Eddy Merckx	Belgium	63	34-18-11	1969	1977
2	André Leducq	France	57	25-13-19	1927	1938
3	Erik Zabel	Germany	53	12-**22**-19	1995	2008
4	Nicolas Frantz	Luxembourg	50	20-18-12	1924	1929
5	**Tadej Pogačar**	Slovenia	49	26-14-9	2020	2026
6	Peter Sagan	Slovakia	47	12-**22**-13	2012	2020
7	Bernard Hinault	France	46	28-12-6	1978	1986
8	Mark Cavendish	Great Britain	44	**35**-4-5	2008	2024
9	Sean Kelly	Ireland	43	5-21-17	1978	1991
10	Charles Pélissier	France	42	16-16-10	1929	1935
10	Gustave Garrigou	France	42	8-13-**21**	1907	1914
12	François Faber	Luxembourg	40	19-10-11	1907	1914
13	André Darrigade	France	39	22-12-5	1953	1964
14	Philippe Thys	Belgium	37	13-11-13	1913	1924
14	Jan Janssen	Netherlands	37	7-15-15	1963	1970
14	Stan Ockers	Belgium	37	3-16-18	1948	1956
17	Jean Alavoine	France	35	17-10-8	1909	1924
18	Miguel Indurain	Spain	33	12-13-8	1986	1996
18	Antonin Magne	France	33	10-12-11	1927	1938
18	Lucien Van Impe	Belgium	33	9-9-15	1969	1983
18	Lucien Petit-Breton	France	33	7-17-9	1905	1913
18	Raymond Poulidor	France	33	7-11-15	1962	1976
23	Freddy Maertens	Belgium	31	15-9-7	1976	1981
23	Joop Zoetemelk	Netherlands	31	10-12-9	1971	1980
25	Gerrie Knetemann	Netherlands	30	10-12-8	1974	1982
25	Walter Godefroot	Belgium	30	10-11-9	1967	1975

Five riders have reached more than 11 stage podiums in a single year:

- Charles Pélissier (FRA) - **18** (1930: eight 1st, seven 2nd and three 3rd places)
- Freddy Maertens (BEL) - **14** (1976: eight 1st, four 2nd and two 3rd places)
- Nicolas Frantz (LUX) - **13** (1928: five 1st, six 2nd and two 3rd places)
- Philippe Thys (BEL) - **13** (1920: four 1st, seven 2nd and two 3rd places)
- Lucien Petit-Breton (FRA) - **12** (1908: five 1st, three 2nd and four 3rd places)

Three riders with highest percentage of podium finishes in a single year:

- Philippe Thys (BEL) - **.867** [13/15] (1920)
- Charles Pélissier (FRA) - **.857** [18/21] (1930)
- Lucien Petit-Breton (FRA) - **.857** [12/14] (1908)

== Stage towns ==
Some cities and towns have hosted 25 or more stage starts and finishes:

- Paris – 149 (most recent finish: 2026)
- Bordeaux – 82 (most recent: 2026)
- Pau – 78 (most recent: 2026)
- Bagnères-de-Luchon – 61 (most recent: 2025)
- Nice – 43 (most recent: 2024)
- Metz – 40 (most recent: 2012)
- Grenoble – 40 (most recent: 2020)
- Caen – 37 (most recent: 2025)
- Briançon – 36 (most recent: 2022)
- Marseille – 36 (most recent: 2017)
- Perpignan – 36 (most recent: 2009)
- Bayonne – 33 (most recent: 2023)
- Belfort – 32 (most recent: 2026)
- L'Alpe d'Huez – 32 (most recent: 2026)
- Montpellier – 32 (most recent: 2025)
- Nantes – 30 (most recent: 2008)
- Brest – 30 (most recent: 2021)
- Toulouse – 29 (most recent: 2025)
- Saint-Étienne – 28 (most recent: 2022)
- Roubaix – 26 (most recent: 2018)

== See also ==
- Multiple winners of the Tour de France
