= Ussat (disambiguation) =

Ussat is a commune in France.

Ussat may also refer to:

== People ==
- Dutch Ussat (1904–1959), American baseball player
- Erich Ussat, German racing cyclist

== Other uses ==
- Ornolac-Ussat-les-Bains, commune in France
