= Auguste Van Tricht =

Belgian cyclist

Personal information
- Born: 24 June 1908 Westmeerbeek, Belgium
- Died: 19 July 1982 (aged 74) Leuven, Belgium

Cycling career
- Sport: Cycling
- Discipline: Road
- Role: Rider

Auguste Van Tricht (24 June 1908 – 19 July 1982) was a Belgian racing cyclist. He rode in the 1931 Tour de France.
