= Milano–Mantova =

Italian cycling race

Milano-Mantova
Race details
- Date: March to September
- Region: Lombardy, Italy
- English name: Milan-Mantua
- Local name(s): Milano-Mantova (in Italian)
- Discipline: Road
- Competition: Cat. 1.1
- Type: One-day race

History
- First edition: 1906
- Editions: 16
- Final edition: 1962
- First winner: Giovanni Rossignoli (ITA)
- Most wins: Leoni Adolfo (ITA); Pieroni Baffi (ITA); (2 wins)
- Final winner: Pieroni Baffi (ITA)

Milano-Mantova was an Italian men's cycling race organized for the last time in 1962. The course, variating from 144 to 274 km, was situated in Lombardy.

Organised by La Gazzetta dello Sport, it was held for the first time on 20 May 1906. After the first three experimental editions from 1906 to 1908, the race returned to the calendar in 1932. From 1936 until the 1943 edition, the name became Trofeo Moschini. After World War II, from 1946, it was organized again under the name Milano-Mantova, until the last edition in 1962.

== Winners ==
| Year | Winner | Second | Third |
|---|---|---|---|
| 1906 | (Italy) Giovanni Rossignoli | (Italy) Giovanni Cuniolo | (Italy) Giulio Tagliavini |
| 1907 | (Italy) Giovanni Cuniolo | (Italy) Giovanni Rossignoli | (Italy) Cezare Zanzottera |
| 1908 | (Italy) Battista Danesi | (Italy) Cezare Zanzottera | (Italy) Giovanni Cuniolo |
| 1909-1931 | No race | | |
| 1932 | (Italy) Carlo Bonfati | (Italy) Adamo Dabini | (Italy) Ezio Migliorini |
| 1933 | (Italy) Fabio Battesini | (Italy) Vasco Bergamaschi | (Italy) Giacomo Gaioni |
| 1934 | (Italy) Enrico Bovet | (Italy) Mario Lusiani | (Italy) Isidoro Piubellini |
| 1935 | (Italy) Vasco Reggianini | (Italy) Edgardo Scapini | (Italy) Franco Maggioni |
| 1936-1945 | No race | | |
| 1946 | (Italy) Mario Ricci | (Italy) Adolfo Leoni | (Italy) Antonio Bevilacqua |
| 1947 | (Italy) Quirino Toccacelli | (Italy) Antonio Covolo | (Italy) Olimpio Bizzi |
| 1948-1953 | No race | | |
| 1954 | (Italy) Giuseppe Calvi | (Italy) Germano Marinoni | (Italy) Mirko Ciapparelli |
| 1955-1956 | No race | | |
| 1957 | (Belgium) Léon Van Daele | (Italy) Gino Guerrini | (Italy) Alfredo Sabbadini |
| 1958 | (Belgium) Rik Van Looy | (Belgium) Jozef Schils | (Italy) Armando Pelligrini |
| 1959 | (Italy) Pierino Baffi | (Belgium) Willy Vannitsen | (Italy) Angelo Conterno |
| 1960 | (Italy) Giuseppe Vanzella | (Italy) Pierino Baffi | (Belgium) Yvo Molenaers |
| 1961 | (Italy) Ercole Baldini | (Italy) Pierino Baffi | (Italy) Renato Giusti |
| 1962 | (Italy) Pierino Baffi | (Italy) Marino Vigna | (Italy) Renato Giusti |
