= Robert Van Grootenbruele =

Belgian cyclist

Personal information
- Born: 5 March 1907 Strijpen, East Flanders, Belgium
- Died: 16 June 1998 (aged 91) Zottegem, East Flanders, Belgium

Cycling career
- Sport: Cycling
- Discipline: Road
- Role: Rider

Robert Van Grootenbruele (5 March 1907 – 16 June 1998) was a Belgian racing cyclist. He rode in the 1931 Tour de France.
