= Gabriel Hargues =

French cyclist

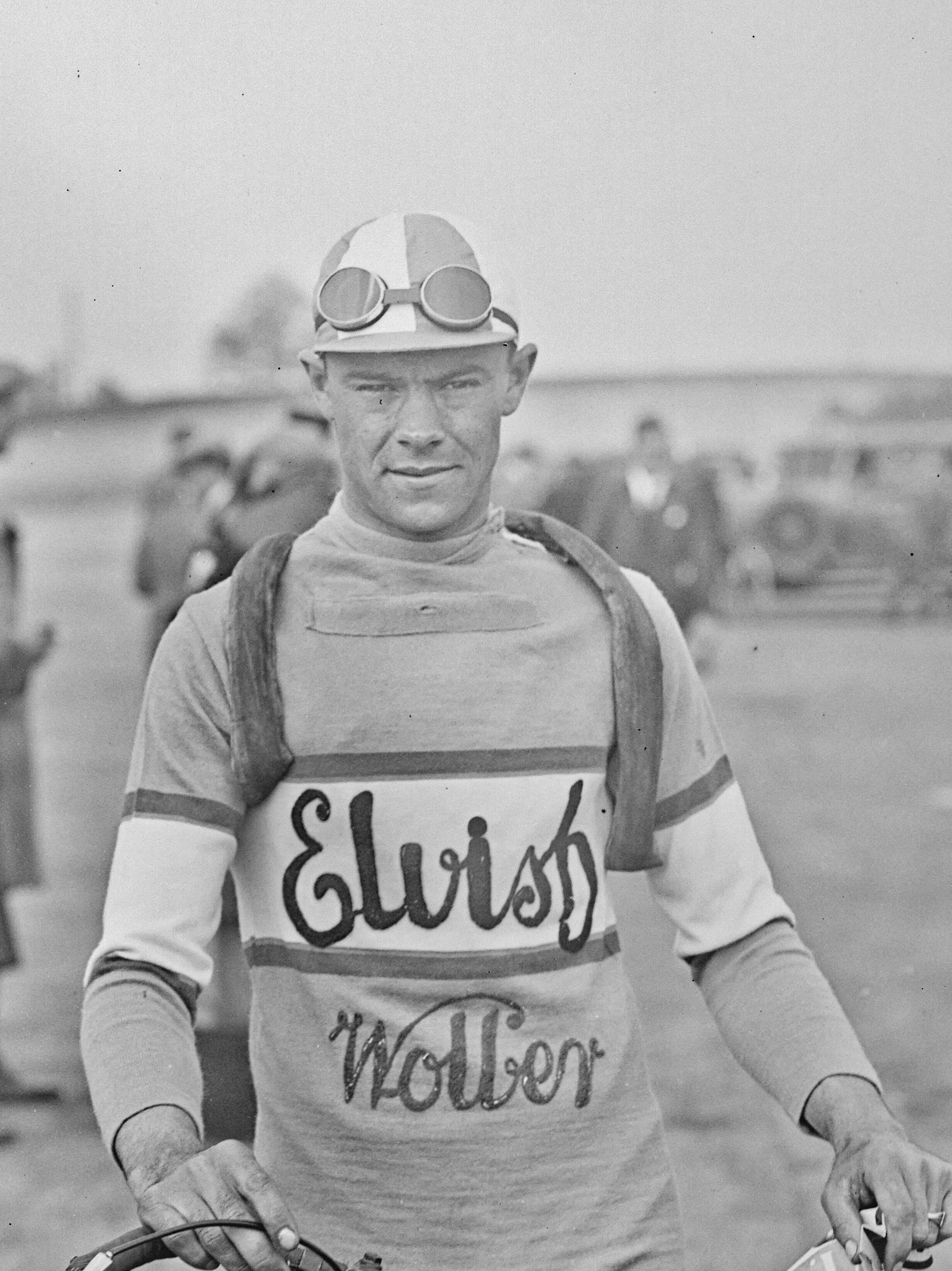

Personal information
- Born: 20 April 1904
- Died: 7 July 1982 (aged 78)

Cycling career
- Sport: Cycling
- Discipline: Road
- Role: Rider

Gabriel Hargues (20 April 1904 – 7 July 1982) was a French racing cyclist. He rode in the 1931 Tour de France.
