= Lazare Venot =

French cyclist

Personal information
- Born: 16 August 1902 Blanzy-sur-Bourbince, France
- Died: 12 March 1977 (aged 74) Montchanin-les-Mines, France

Cycling career
- Sport: Cycling
- Discipline: Road
- Role: Rider

Lazare Venot (16 August 1902 – 12 March 1977) was a French racing cyclist. He rode in the 1931 Tour de France.
