= Achille Viaene =

Belgian cyclist

Personal information
- Born: 21 September 1905

Cycling career
- Sport: Cycling
- Discipline: Road
- Role: Rider

Achille Viaene (born 21 September 1905, date of death unknown) was a Belgian racing cyclist. He rode in the 1931 Tour de France.
