= Kurt Nitschke =

German cyclist

Personal information
- Born: 25 April 1908
- Died: 6 December 1970 (aged 62)

Cycling career
- Sport: Cycling
- Discipline: Road
- Role: Rider

Kurt Nitschke (25 April 1908 – 6 December 1970) was a German racing cyclist. He rode in the 1931 Tour de France.
