= Herbert Sieronski =

German cyclist

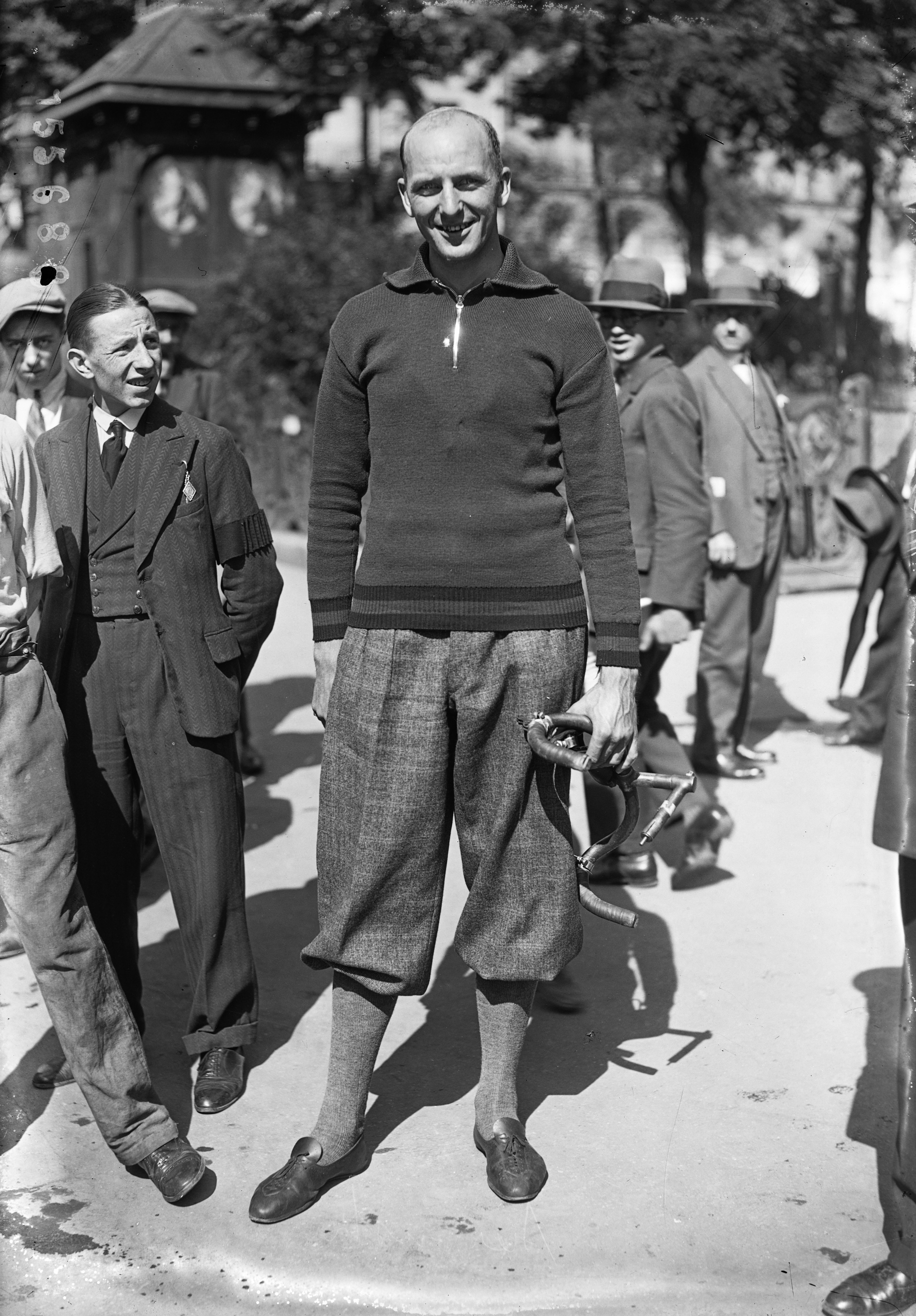
- Sieronski in 1931

Personal information
- Born: 8 November 1906 Berlin, Germany
- Died: 1 January 1945 (aged 38) Soviet Union

Cycling career
- Sport: Cycling
- Discipline: Road
- Role: Rider

Herbert Sieronski (8 November 1906 – 1 January 1945) was a German racing cyclist. He rode in the 1931 Tour de France.
