= André Godinat =

French cyclist

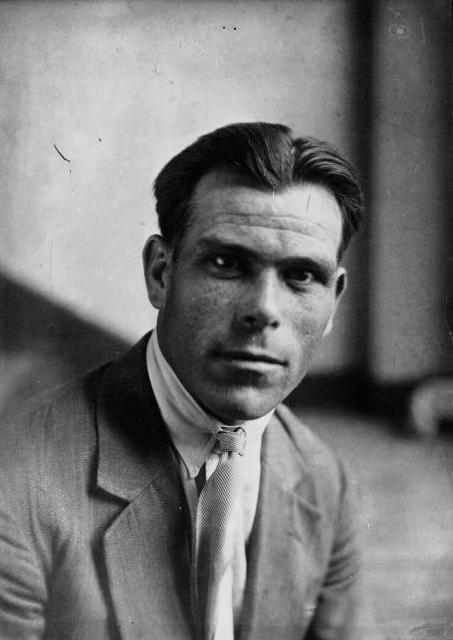

Personal information
- Full name: André Godinat
- Born: 9 March 1903 Reuil, France
- Died: 3 October 1979 (aged 76) Épernay, France

Cycling career
- Sport: Cycling
- Discipline: Road
- Role: Rider

Major wins
- French national road race champion (1932); One stage 1931 Tour de France

André Godinat (9 March 1903 in Reuil – 3 October 1979 in Épernay) was a French professional road bicycle racer. He became French national road race champion in 1931. In 1932, he won a stage in the 1932 Tour de France.

== Major results ==
1928
Nancy-Colmar
1931
Epernay - Chaumont - Épernay
Tour de France:

Winner stage 4

1932
France national road race championships
1934
GP de Thizy
1935
GP de Thizy
Chauffailles
