= Jules Goedhuys =

Belgian cyclist

Personal information
- Born: 8 July 1905
- Died: 7 August 1997 (aged 92)

Cycling career
- Sport: Cycling
- Discipline: Road
- Role: Rider

Jules Goedhuys (8 July 1905 – 7 August 1997) was a Belgian racing cyclist. He rode in the 1931 Tour de France.
