= Erich Ussat =

German cyclist

Personal information
- Born: 31 May 1907 Berlin, German Empire

Cycling career
- Sport: Cycling
- Discipline: Road
- Role: Rider

Erich Ussat (born 31 May 1907, date of death unknown) was a German racing cyclist. He rode in the 1931 Tour de France.
