= Roger Pipoz =

Swiss cyclist (1905–1956)

Personal information
- Born: 1 January 1905
- Died: 26 May 1956 (aged 51)

Cycling career
- Sport: Cycling
- Discipline: Road
- Role: Rider

Roger Pipoz (1 January 1905 – 26 May 1956) was a Swiss racing cyclist. He rode in the 1931 Tour de France.
