= Jean Naert =

Belgian cyclist

Personal information
- Born: 28 May 1904
- Died: 28 December 1962 (aged 58)

Cycling career
- Sport: Cycling
- Discipline: Road
- Role: Rider

Jean Naert (28 May 1904 – 28 December 1962) was a Belgian racing cyclist. He rode in the 1931 Tour de France.
