= Erich Metze =

German cyclist (1909–1952)

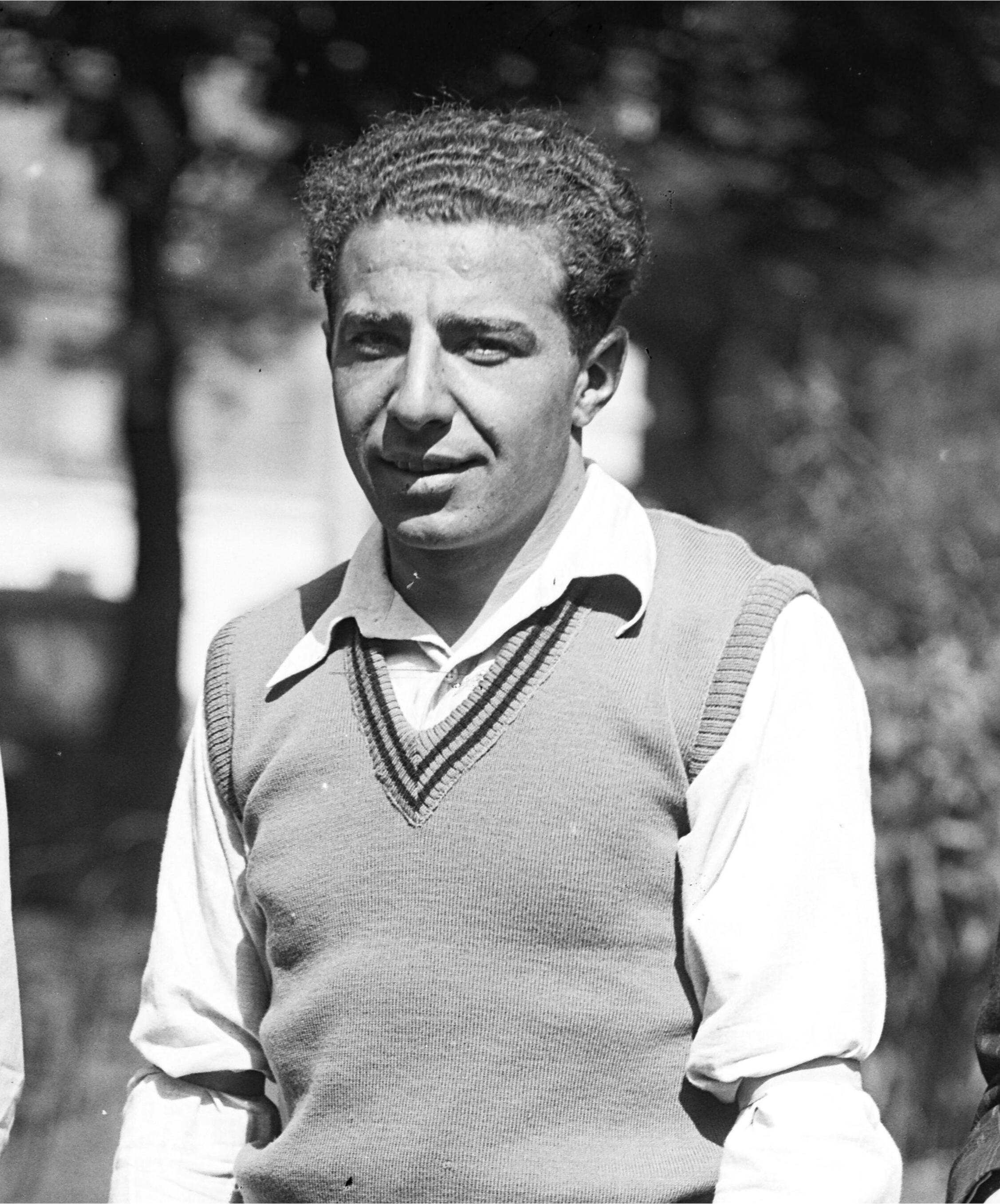
- Metze before the start of the 1931 Tour de France

Personal information
- Born: 7 May 1909 Dortmund, Germany
- Died: 28 May 1952 (aged 43) Erfurt, Germany

Sport
- Sport: Cycling
Medal record
Representing Germany
UCI Motor-paced World Championships
Bronze medal – third place	1933 Paris	Professionals
Gold medal – first place	1934 Leipzig	Professionals
Silver medal – second place	1935 Brussels	Professionals
Gold medal – first place	1938 Amsterdam	Professionals

Erich Metze (7 May 1909 – 28 May 1952) was a German professional cyclist.

He began his career as a road racer, and in 1931 won the Deutschland Tour and finished eights in the Tour de France. He then changed to motor-paced racing. In this discipline, he won four medals at the UCI Motor-paced World Championships between 1933 and 1938, including two gold medals in 1934 and 1938. He also won five national titles in 1933–1936 and 1939.

The long breaks in his career were caused by severe crashes, which caused two fractures of the skull. He had further injuries during World War II while fighting as a soldier. After the war he returned to competitions, but had another serious crash, which resulted in a third skull fracture and death in a hospital in 1952.
