= François Henri =

French cyclist

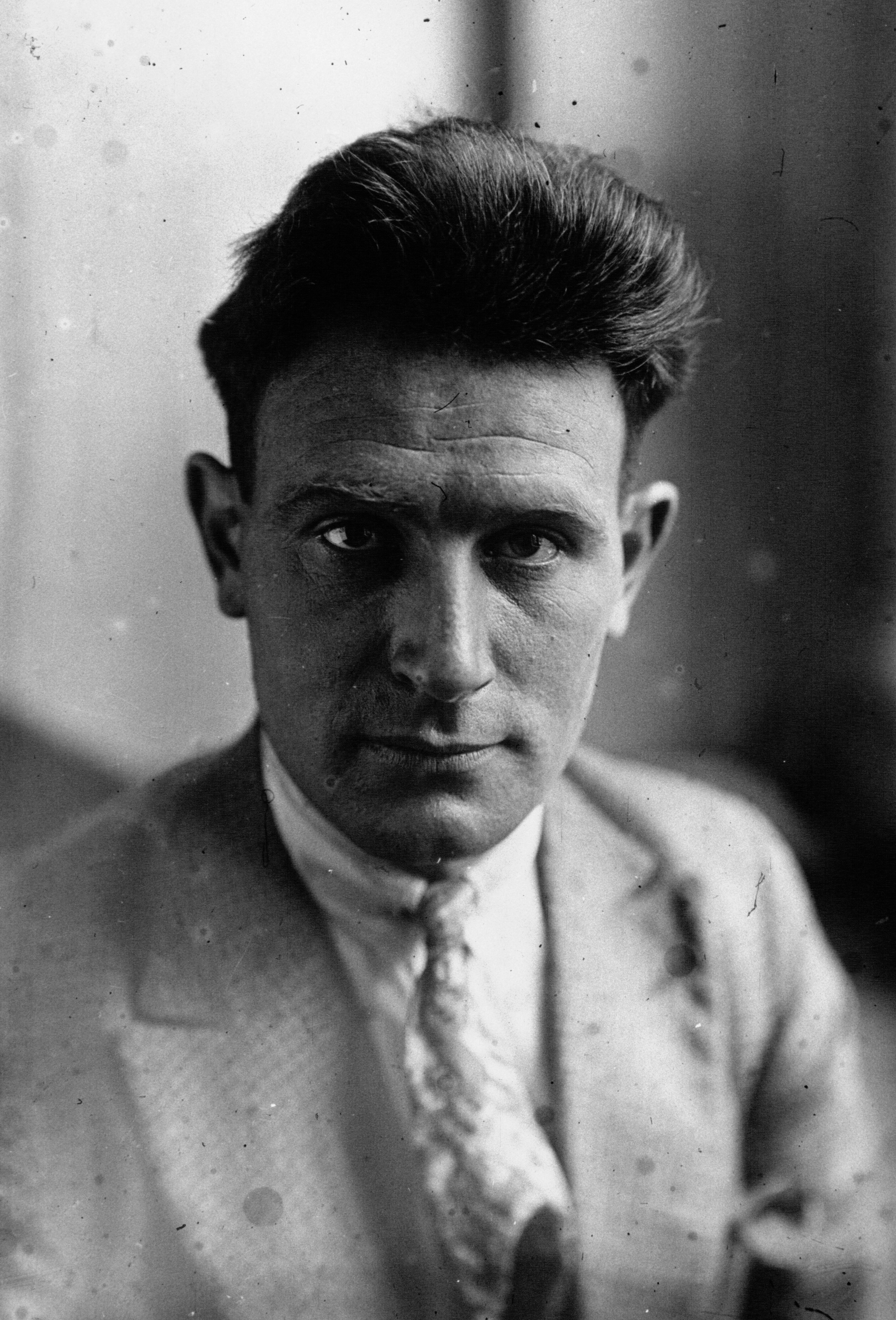

Personal information
- Born: 14 April 1903
- Died: 23 October 1980 (aged 77)

Cycling career
- Sport: Cycling
- Discipline: Road
- Role: Rider

François Henri (14 April 1903 – 23 October 1980) was a French racing cyclist. He rode in the 1928 Tour de France.
