= Marius Guiramand =

French cyclist

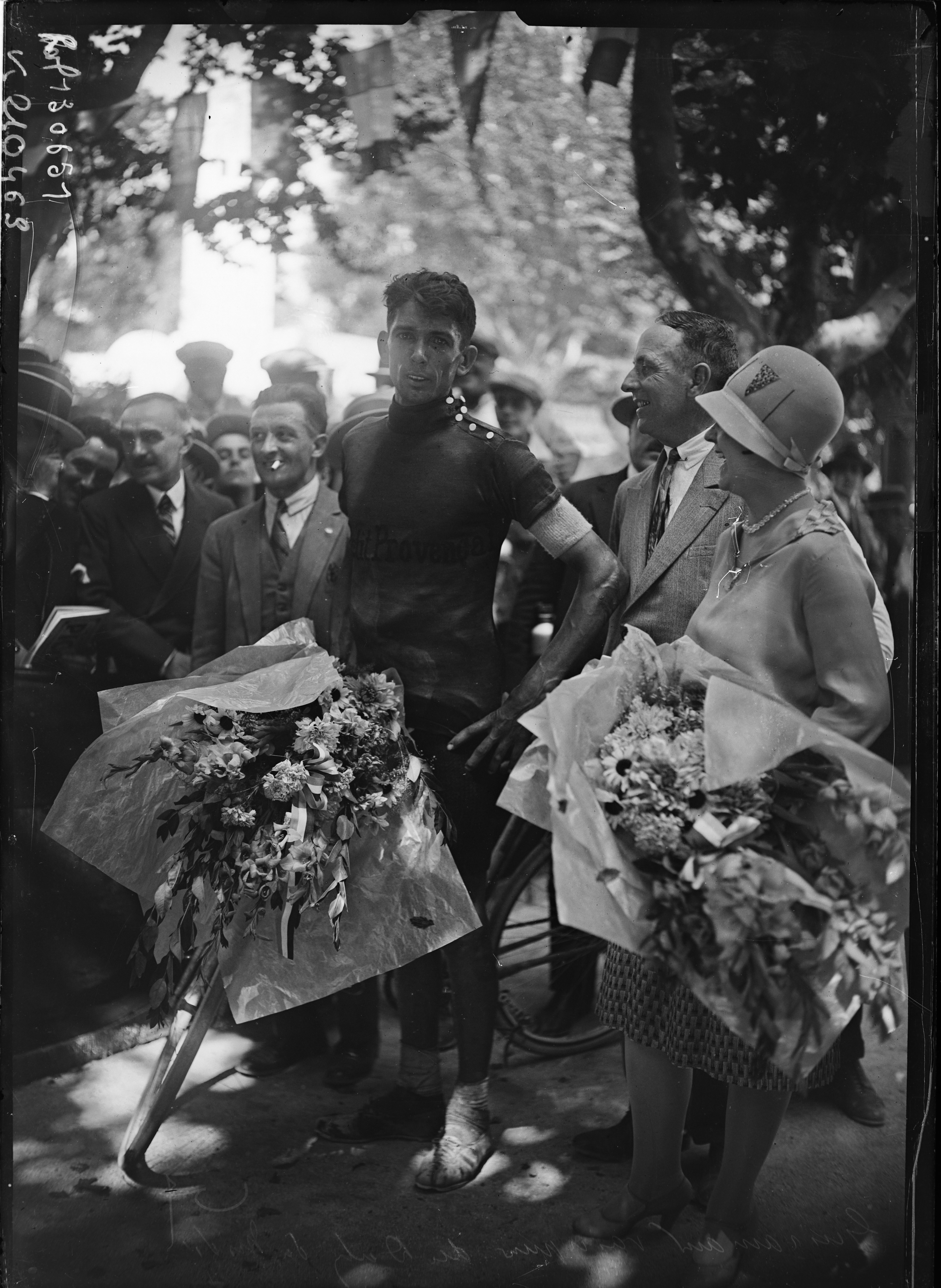

Personal information
- Born: 12 December 1905
- Died: 26 February 1964 (aged 58)

Cycling career
- Sport: Cycling
- Discipline: Road
- Role: Rider

Marius Guiramand (12 December 1905 – 26 February 1964) was a French racing cyclist. He rode in the 1931 Tour de France.
