= Léon Le Calvez =

French cyclist

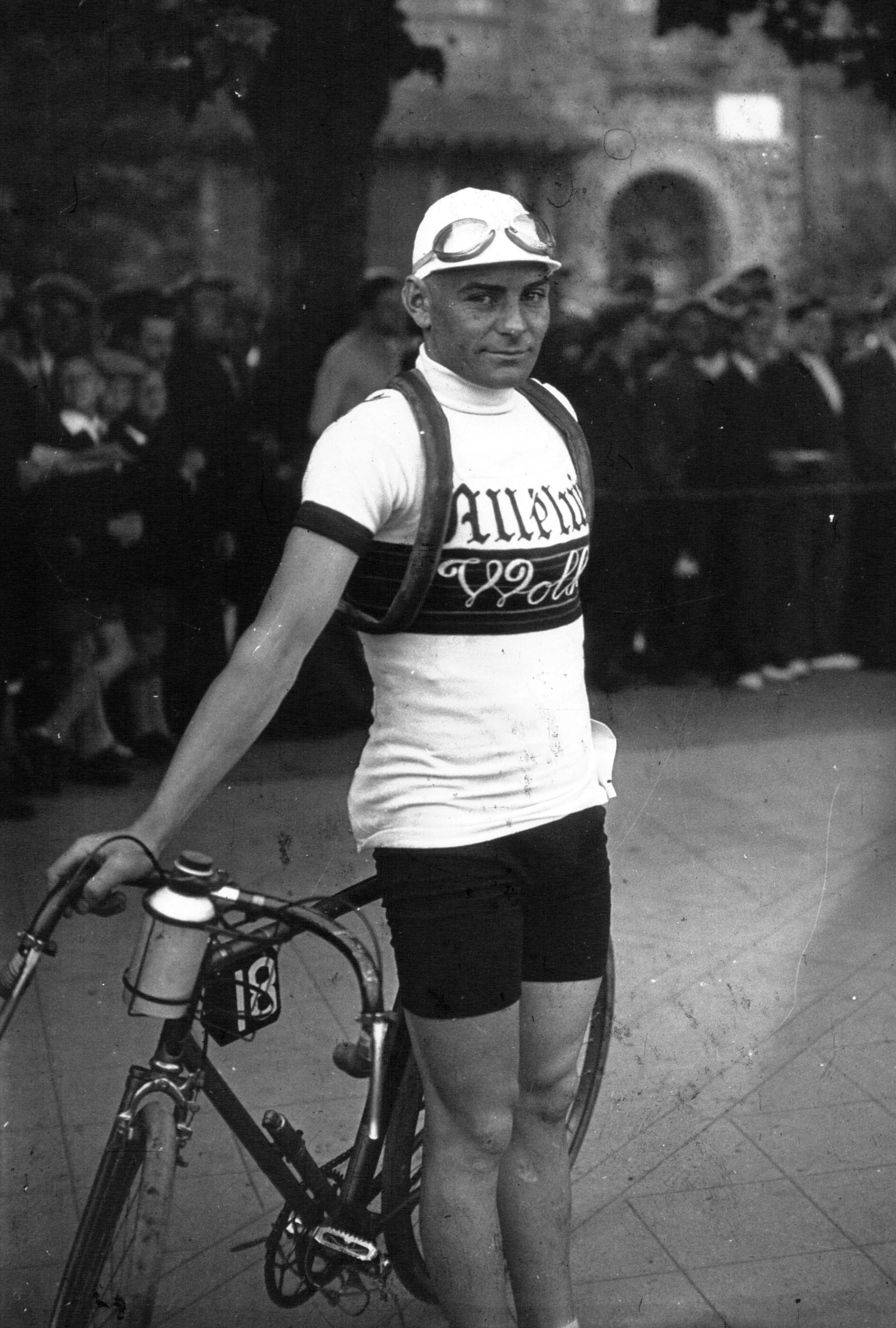

Personal information
- Full name: Léon Le Calvez
- Born: 14 March 1909 Moëlan-sur-Mer, France
- Died: 7 July 1995 (aged 86) Créteil, France

Cycling career
- Sport: Cycling
- Discipline: Road
- Role: Rider

Major wins
- Critérium International

Léon Le Calvez (14 March 1909, in Moëlan-sur-Mer – 7 July 1995, in Créteil) was a French professional road bicycle racer. In the 1931 Tour de France, Le Calvez was wearing the yellow jersey for one day.

== Palmarès ==
1932
Critérium International
1933
Paris–Roubaix

3rd place overall

1935
Stage Paris–Nice
