= André Van Vierst =

French cyclist

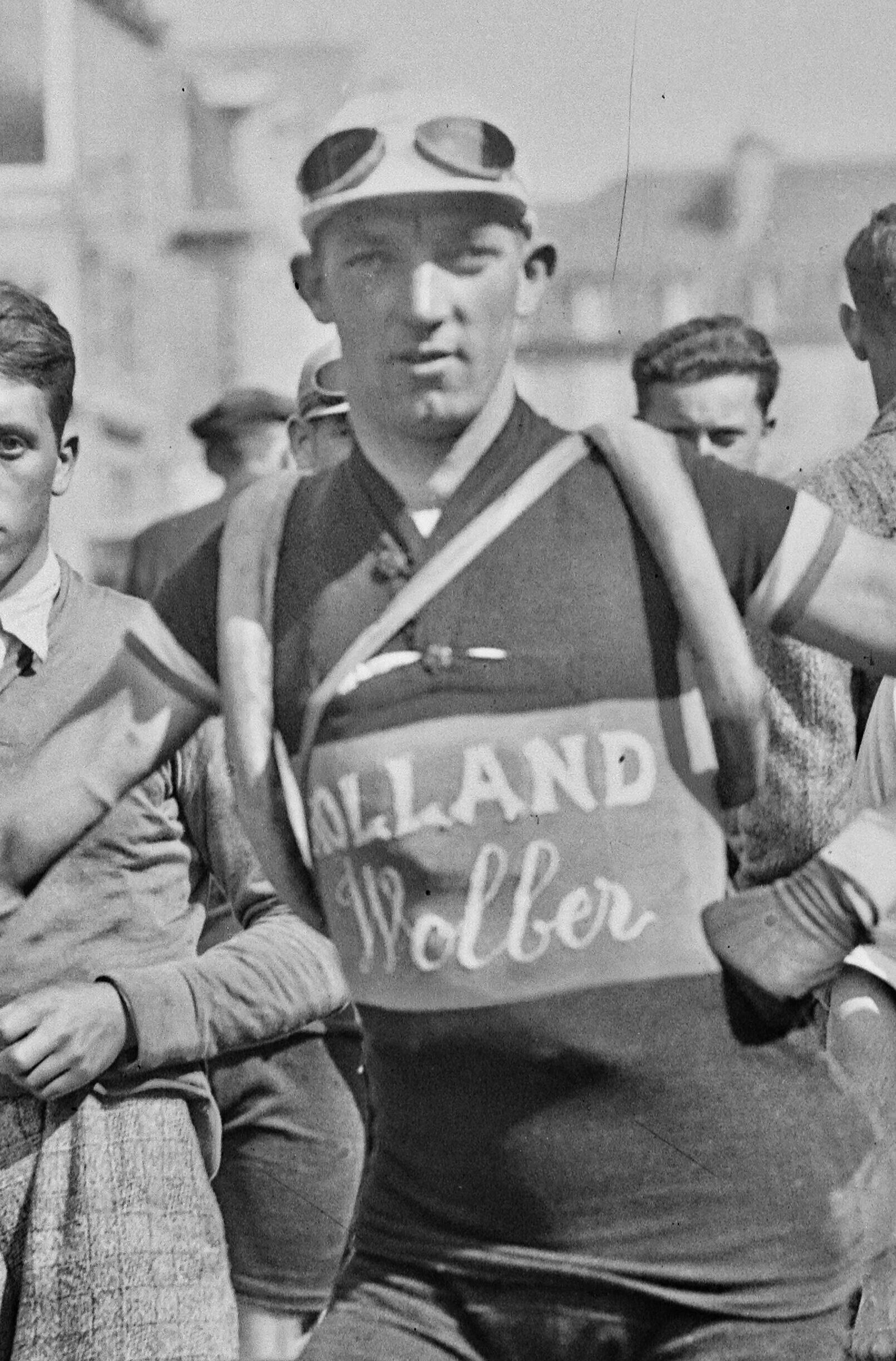

Personal information
- Born: 25 May 1904
- Died: 13 October 1991 (aged 87)

Cycling career
- Sport: Cycling
- Discipline: Road
- Role: Rider

André Van Vierst (25 May 1904 – 13 October 1991) was a French racing cyclist. He rode in the 1928 Tour de France.
