= Fabio Battesini =

Italian cyclist (1912–1987)

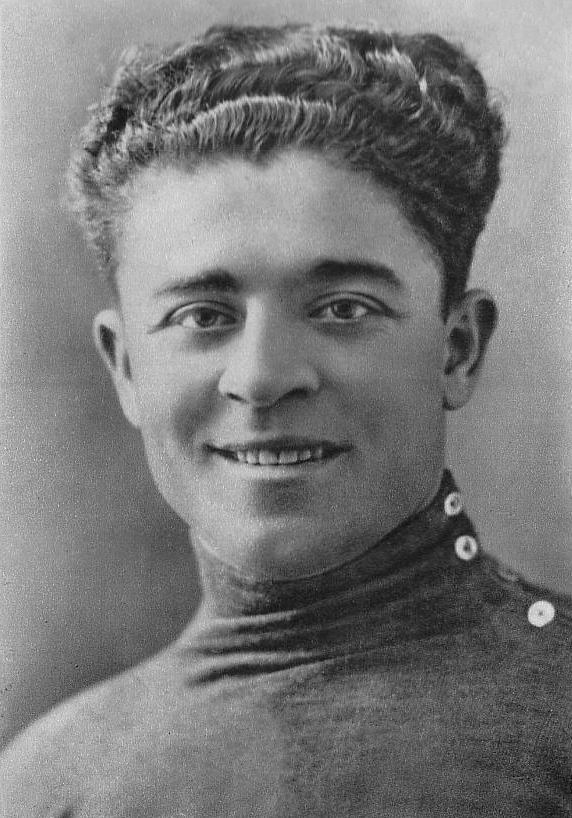
- Fabio Battesini c. 1937

Personal information
- Full name: Fabio Battesini
- Born: 19 February 1912 Virgilio, Italy
- Died: 17 June 1987 (aged 75) Rome, Italy

Cycling career
- Sport: Cycling
- Discipline: Road
- Role: Rider

Major wins
- Grand Tours Tour de France 1 individual stage (1931) Giro d'Italia 3 individual stages (1932, 1934, 1936) One-day races and Classics Milano-Mantova (1933)

Fabio Battesini (19 February 1912 – 17 June 1987) was an Italian professional road bicycle racer. He won one stage in the 1931 Tour de France and three stages of the Giro d'Italia in 1932–1936.

== Teams ==
- 1930-1931: Maino-Clement
- 1932: Gloria-Hutchison
- 1933: Maino-Ckement
- 1934: Legnano
- 1935: Wolsit
- 1936-1938: Legano
- 1938: La Volce Di Mantova
- 1941: Dei
- 1946: Viscontea

== Major results ==
1931
Tour de France:

Winner stage 3

1932
Giro d'Italia:

Winner stage 3

1933
Milano–Mantova
1934
Giro d'Italia:

Winner stage 15

1935
Cremone
Giro della provincia Milano (with Learco Guerra)
1936
Giro d'Italia:

Winner stage 4
