= 1931 Tour de France =

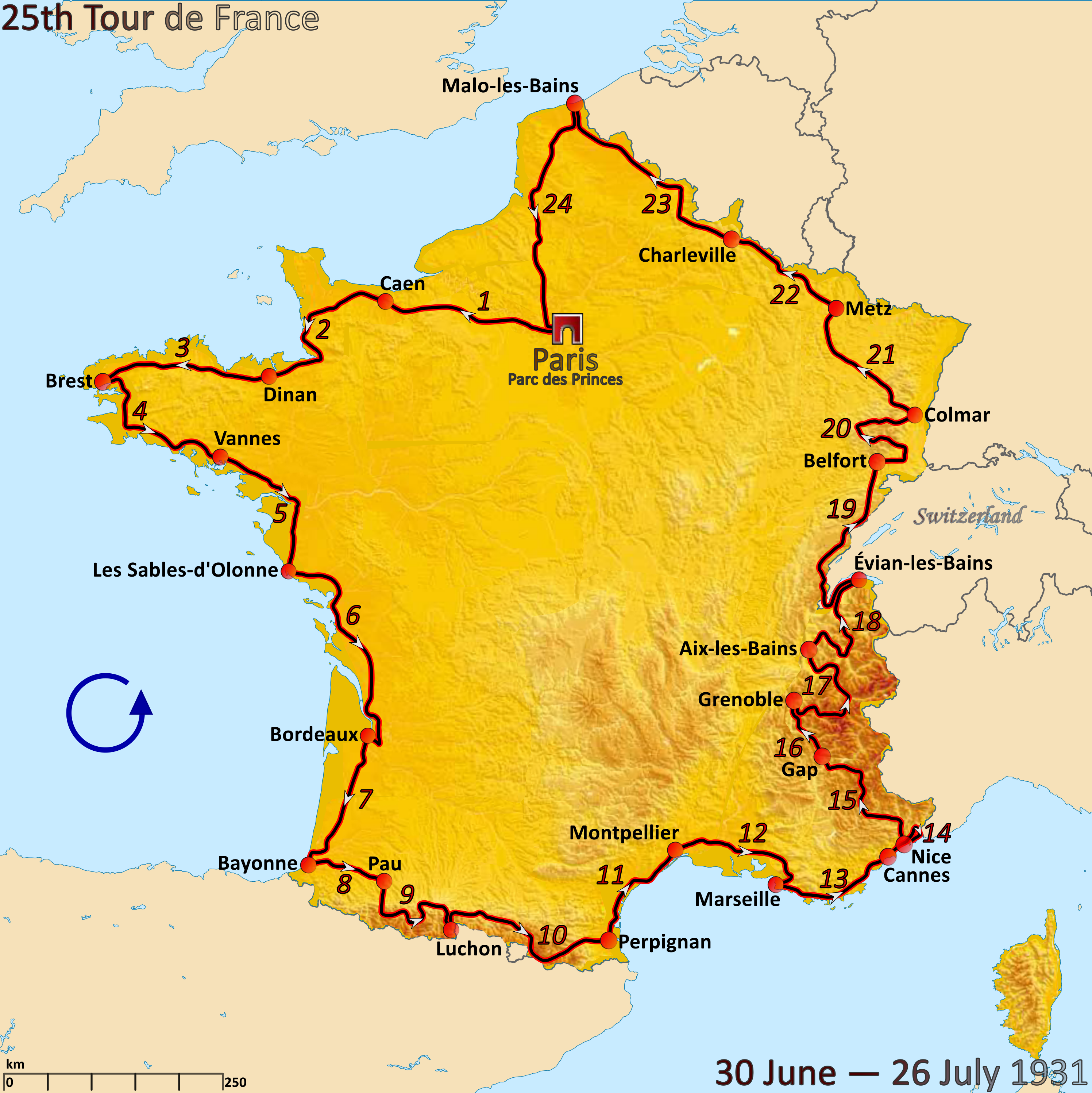
- Route of the 1931 Tour de France followed counterclockwise, starting in Paris

Race details
- Dates: 30 June – 26 July 1931
- Stages: 24
- Distance: 5,091 km (3,163 mi)
- Winning time: 177h 10' 03"

Results
Jersey awarded to the overall winner	Winner	Antonin Magne (FRA)	(France)
	Second	Jef Demuysere (BEL)	(Belgium)
	Third	Antonio Pesenti (ITA)	(Italy)
	Team	Belgium	

The 1931 Tour de France was the 25th edition of the Tour de France, which took place from 30 June to 26 July. It consisted of 24 stages over 5,091 km (3,163 mi).

The race was won by French cyclist Antonin Magne. The sprinters Charles Pélissier and Rafaele di Paco both won five stages.

The cyclists were separated into national teams and touriste-routiers, who were grouped into regional teams. In some stages (2, 3, 4, 6, 7 and 12), the national teams started 10 minutes before the touriste-routiers.

One of these touriste-routiers was Max Bulla. In the second stage, when the touriste-routiers started 10 minutes later than the national teams, Bulla overtook the national teams, won the stage and took the lead, the only time in history that a touriste-routier was leading the Tour de France.

== Innovations and changes ==
In 1931, the touriste-routiers started 10 minutes later than the national teams in some stages (2, 3, 4, 6, and 12). The number of rest days in the Tour de France was reduced to three.

The time bonus for the winner, which had been used before in the 1924 Tour de France, was reintroduced.

== Teams ==
For the second year, the race was run in the national team format, with six different teams. Belgium, Italy, Germany and France each sent a team with eight cyclists. Australia and Switzerland sent a combined team, each with four cyclists. The last team was the Spanish team, with only one cyclist. In addition, 40 cyclists joined as touriste-routiers.

The French team was favourite, because they had dominated the 1930 Tour. The most competition was expected from the Belgian team, followed by the Italian team.

== Race overview ==
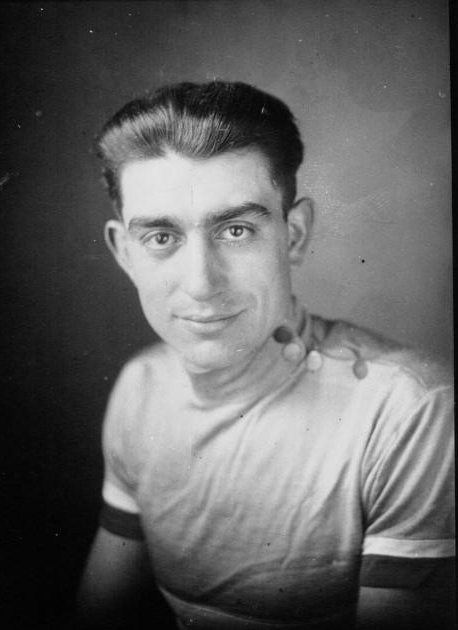
Antonin Magne, the winner of the 1931 Tour de France

In the early flat stages, the sprinters dominated. In the second stage, Austrian Max Bulla won the stage. He was a touriste-routier, and had started ten minutes later than the A-class cyclists. He became the first, and only, touriste-routier to lead the Tour de France, and as of 2011 is the only Austrian to have led the race. Max Bulla was the only Austrian cyclist to win a stage in the Tour de France until 2005, when Georg Totschnig won the 14th stage.

After the fifth stage, Charles Pélissier and Rafaele di Paco shared the lead, thanks to the time bonus. After the seventh stage, the race was still completely open: the first 30 cyclists in the general classification were within 10 minutes of each other.

The defending champion, André Leducq, was not in good shape. His teammate Antonin Magne took over the leading role in the French team. In the first mountain stage, Belgian Jef Demuysere was away, with Antonin Magne trying to get him back. After a while, Jef Demuysere flatted, and at that moment Magne passed him. Magne had not seen Demuysere, and still thought he was chasing him. He kept racing as fast as he could, and finished four minutes ahead of Antonio Pesenti. In the next stage, a large group finished together, and Magne was still leading the race with Pesenti as his closest competitor.

In the fourteenth stage, Pesenti was away with two teammates. The French team tried to get them back, but didn't succeed. In the end, Magne chased them by himself, but he could not get back to the Italians. His lead decreased to five minutes. In the fifteenth stage, the Italians tried it again, but they were reeled back in by Charles Pélissier. Then Jef Demuysere got away, and won the stage with a margin of two minutes on Magne.

Before the penultimate stage, Magne was still leading the race, closely followed by Pesenti. Magne was not sure if he would win the race, because that stage would be over cobbles, on which the Belgian cyclists were considered experts. The night before the stage, Magne could not sleep, and his roommate Leducq suggested that he could read some fan mail. Magne considered reading fan mail before the race was over as giving bad luck, but one oversized letter made him curious. Magne opened it, and read a letter from a fan who claimed that Belgian cyclist Gaston Rebry (who had won the 1931 Paris–Roubaix race over the same cobbles) had written to his mother that he was planning to attack on the penultimate stage, together with Jef Demuysere. Leducq thought the letter was a joke, but Magne did not take the risk and told his teammates to stay close to Rebry and Demuysere. After 60 km, Rebry and Demuysere took off, and Magne followed them. The Belgians took turns to attack Magne, but they could not get away from him. They finished more than seventeen minutes ahead of Pesenti, which secured the victory for Magne and had Demuysere overtake Pesenti for the second place.

== Results ==
In stages 2, 3, 4, 6, 7 and 12, the national teams started 10 minutes before the touriste-routiers; in all other stages all cyclists started together. The cyclist to reach the finish in the least time was the winner of the stage. The time that each cyclist required to finish the stage was recorded. For the general classification, these times were added together. If a cyclist had received a time bonus, it was subtracted from this total; all time penalties were added to this total. The cyclist with the least accumulated time was the race leader, identified by the yellow jersey.

The team classification was calculated by adding up the times in the general classification of the three highest ranking cyclists per team; the team with the least time was the winner.

=== Stage winners ===
Five stages were won by touriste-routiers: Stages 2, 4, 7, 12 and 17, the highest number of stages ever won by touriste-routiers.

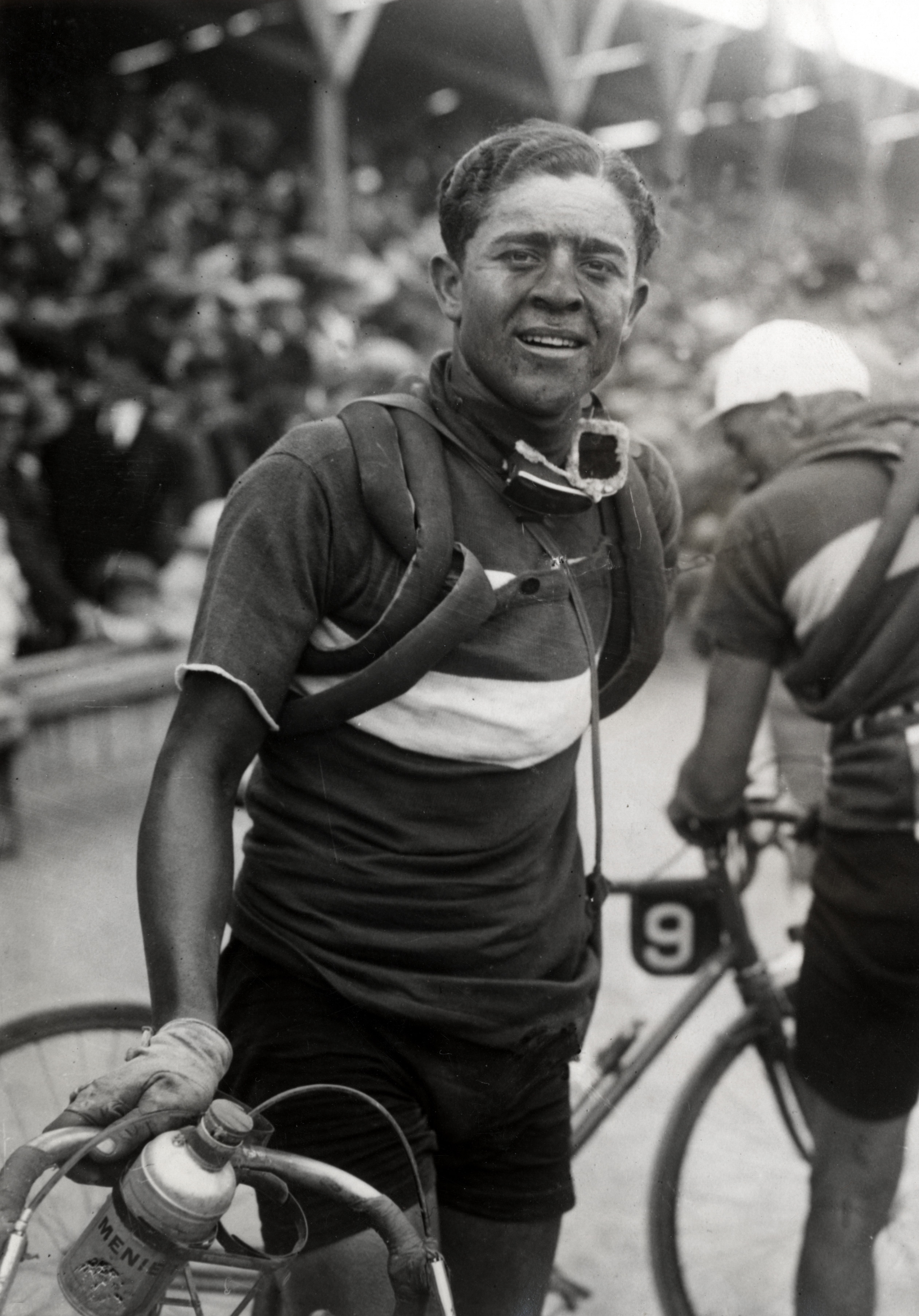
Fabio Battesini, the winner of the third stage

Stage characteristics and winners
Stage	Date	Course	Distance	Type (Note: There was no distinction in the rules between plain stages and mountain stages; the icons shown here indicate which stages included mountains.)	Winner	Race leader
1	30 June	Paris to Caen	208 km (129 mi)	Plain stage	Alfred Haemerlinck (BEL)	Alfred Haemerlinck (BEL)
2	1 July	Caen to Dinan	212 km (132 mi)	Plain stage	Max Bulla (AUT)	Max Bulla (AUT)
3	2 July	Dinan to Brest	206 km (128 mi)	Plain stage	Fabio Battesini (ITA)	Léon Le Calvez (FRA)
4	3 July	Brest to Vannes	211 km (131 mi)	Plain stage	André Godinat (FRA)	Rafaele di Paco (ITA)
5	4 July	Vannes to Les Sables d'Olonne	202 km (126 mi)	Plain stage	Charles Pélissier (FRA)	Charles Pélissier (FRA); Rafaele di Paco (ITA) (Note: After the 5th stage, Pélissier and di Paco had the same time in the general classification. There was no rule for this, so both received the yellow jersey.)
6	5 July	Les Sables d'Olonne to Bordeaux	338 km (210 mi)	Plain stage	Alfred Haemerlinck (BEL)	Rafaele di Paco (ITA)
7	6 July	Bordeaux to Bayonne	180 km (110 mi)	Plain stage	Gérard Loncke (BEL)	Rafaele di Paco (ITA)
8	7 July	Bayonne to Pau	106 km (66 mi)	Plain stage	Charles Pélissier (FRA)	Charles Pélissier (FRA)
9	8 July	Pau to Luchon	231 km (144 mi)	Stage with mountain(s)	Antonin Magne (FRA)	Antonin Magne (FRA)
10	10 July	Luchon to Perpignan	322 km (200 mi)	Stage with mountain(s)	Rafaele di Paco (ITA)	Antonin Magne (FRA)
11	12 July	Perpignan to Montpellier	164 km (102 mi)	Plain stage	Rafaele di Paco (ITA)	Antonin Magne (FRA)
12	13 July	Montpellier to Marseille	207 km (129 mi)	Plain stage	Max Bulla (AUT)	Antonin Magne (FRA)
13	14 July	Marseille to Cannes	181 km (112 mi)	Plain stage	Charles Pélissier (FRA)	Antonin Magne (FRA)
14	15 July	Cannes to Nice	132 km (82 mi)	Stage with mountain(s)	Eugenio Gestri (ITA)	Antonin Magne (FRA)
15	17 July	Nice to Gap	233 km (145 mi)	Stage with mountain(s)	Jef Demuysere (BEL)	Antonin Magne (FRA)
16	18 July	Gap to Grenoble	102 km (63 mi)	Stage with mountain(s)	Charles Pélissier (FRA)	Antonin Magne (FRA)
17	19 July	Grenoble to Aix-les-Bains	230 km (140 mi)	Stage with mountain(s)	Max Bulla (AUT)	Antonin Magne (FRA)
18	20 July	Aix-les-Bains to Evian	204 km (127 mi)	Stage with mountain(s)	Jef Demuysere (BEL)	Antonin Magne (FRA)
19	21 July	Evian to Belfort	282 km (175 mi)	Stage with mountain(s)	Rafaele di Paco (ITA)	Antonin Magne (FRA)
20	22 July	Belfort to Colmar	209 km (130 mi)	Stage with mountain(s)	André Leducq (FRA)	Antonin Magne (FRA)
21	23 July	Colmar to Metz	192 km (119 mi)	Plain stage	Rafaele di Paco (ITA)	Antonin Magne (FRA)
22	24 July	Metz to Charleville	159 km (99 mi)	Plain stage	Raffaele di Paco (ITA)	Antonin Magne (FRA)
23	25 July	Charleville to Malo-les-Bains	271 km (168 mi)	Plain stage	Gaston Rebry (BEL)	Antonin Magne (FRA)
24	26 July	Malo-les-Bains to Paris	313 km (194 mi)	Plain stage	Charles Pélissier (FRA)	Antonin Magne (FRA)
	Total		5,091 km (3,163 mi)			

=== General classification ===
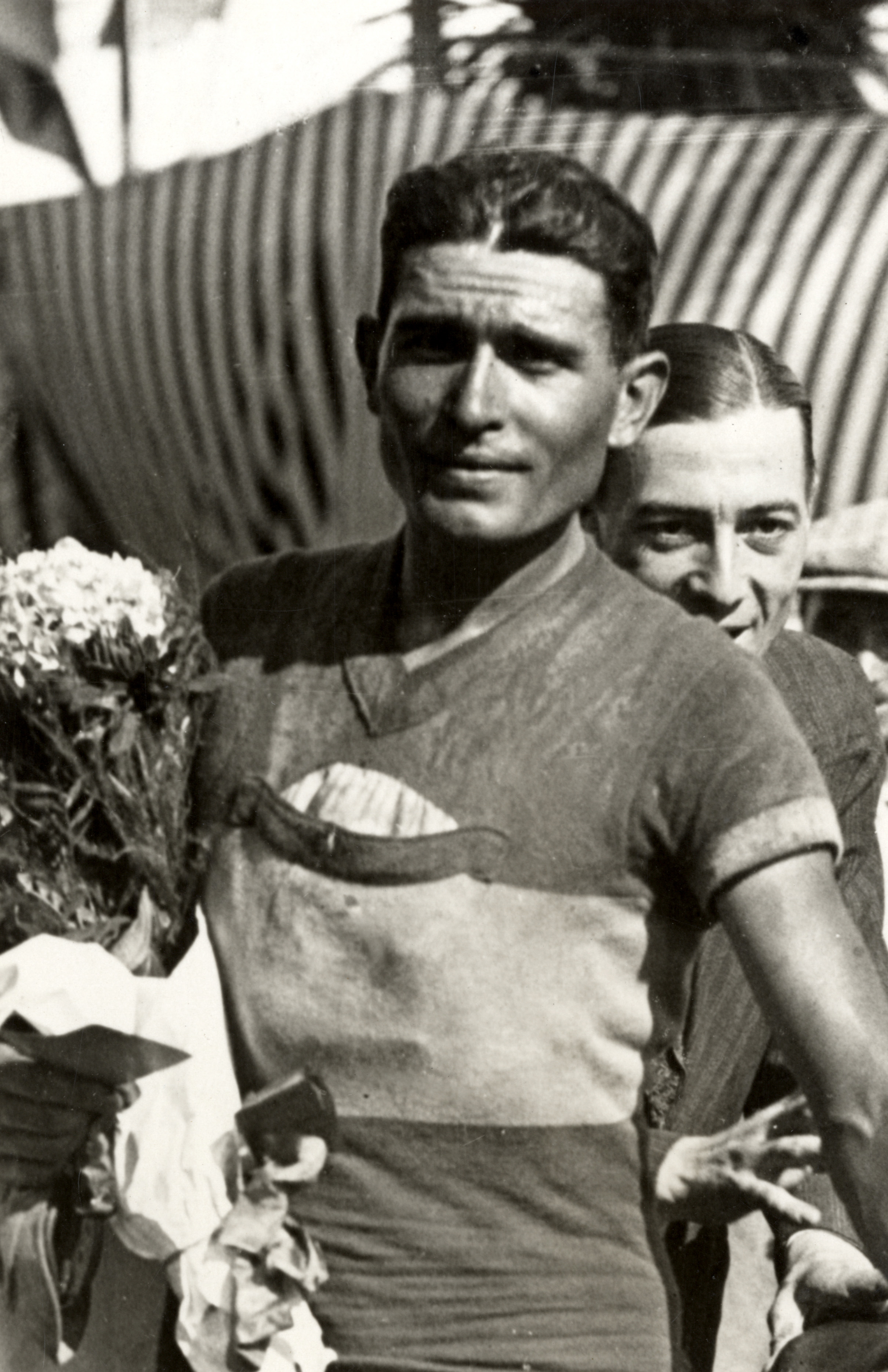
Louis Peglion, seventh place in the general classification

Final general classification (1–10)
Rank	Rider	Team	Time
1	Antonin Magne (FRA)	France	177h 10' 03"
2	Jef Demuysere (BEL)	Belgium	+ 12' 56"
3	Antonio Pesenti (ITA)	Italy	+ 22' 51"
4	Gaston Rebry (BEL)	Belgium	+ 46' 40"
5	Maurice De Waele (BEL)	Belgium	+ 49' 46"
6	Julien Vervaecke (BEL)	Belgium	+ 1h 10' 11"
7	Louis Peglion (FRA)	France	+ 1h 18' 33"
8	Erich Metze (GER)	Germany	+ 1h 20' 59"
9	Albert Büchi (SUI)	Australia/Switzerland	+ 1h 29' 29"
10	André Leducq (FRA)	France	+ 1h 30' 08"

Final general classification (11–35)
Rank	Rider	Team	Time
11	Oskar Thierbach (GER)	Germany	+ 1h 34' 03"
12	Hubert Opperman (AUS)	Australia/Switzerland	+ 1h 36' 43"
13	Benoît Fauré (FRA)	France	+ 1h 40' 38"
14	Charles Pélissier (FRA)	France	+ 1h 45' 11"
15	Max Bulla (AUT)	Touriste-routier	+ 1h 51' 32"
16	Kurt Stöpel (GER)	Germany	+ 2h 05' 58"
17	Rafaele Di Paco (ITA)	Italy	+ 2h 11' 11"
18	Alfons Schepers (BEL)	Belgium	+ 2h 15' 27"
19	Ludwig Geyer (GER)	Germany	+ 2h 16' 22"
20	Herbert Sieronski (GER)	Germany	+ 2h 23' 40"
21	Roger Pipoz (SUI)	Australia/Switzerland	+ 2h 25' 19"
22	Hermann Buse (GER)	Germany	+ 2h 28' 22"
23	Alfred Siegel (GER)	Germany	+ 2h 36' 06"
24	Marius Guiramand (FRA)	Touriste-routier	+ 3h 05' 39"
25	Michele Orecchia (ITA)	Italy	+ 3h 09' 26"
26	André Van Vierst (FRA)	Touriste-routier	+ 3h 33' 44"
27	Joseph Mauclair (FRA)	France	+ 3h 41' 22"
28	Louis Bajard (FRA)	Touriste-routier	+ 4h 06' 02"
29	Fernand Fayolle (FRA)	Touriste-routier	+ 4h 20' 58"
30	Fabio Battesini (ITA)	Italy	+ 4h 39' 43"
31	Lazare Venot (FRA)	Touriste-routier	+ 4h 42' 04"
32	Jean Maréchal (FRA)	France	+ 4h 43' 15"
33	Julius Goedhuys (BEL)	Touriste-routier	+ 4h 47' 09"
34	François Henri (FRA)	Touriste-routier	+ 5h 13' 00"
35	Richard Lamb (AUS)	Australia/Switzerland	+ 6h 27' 06"

=== Team classification ===
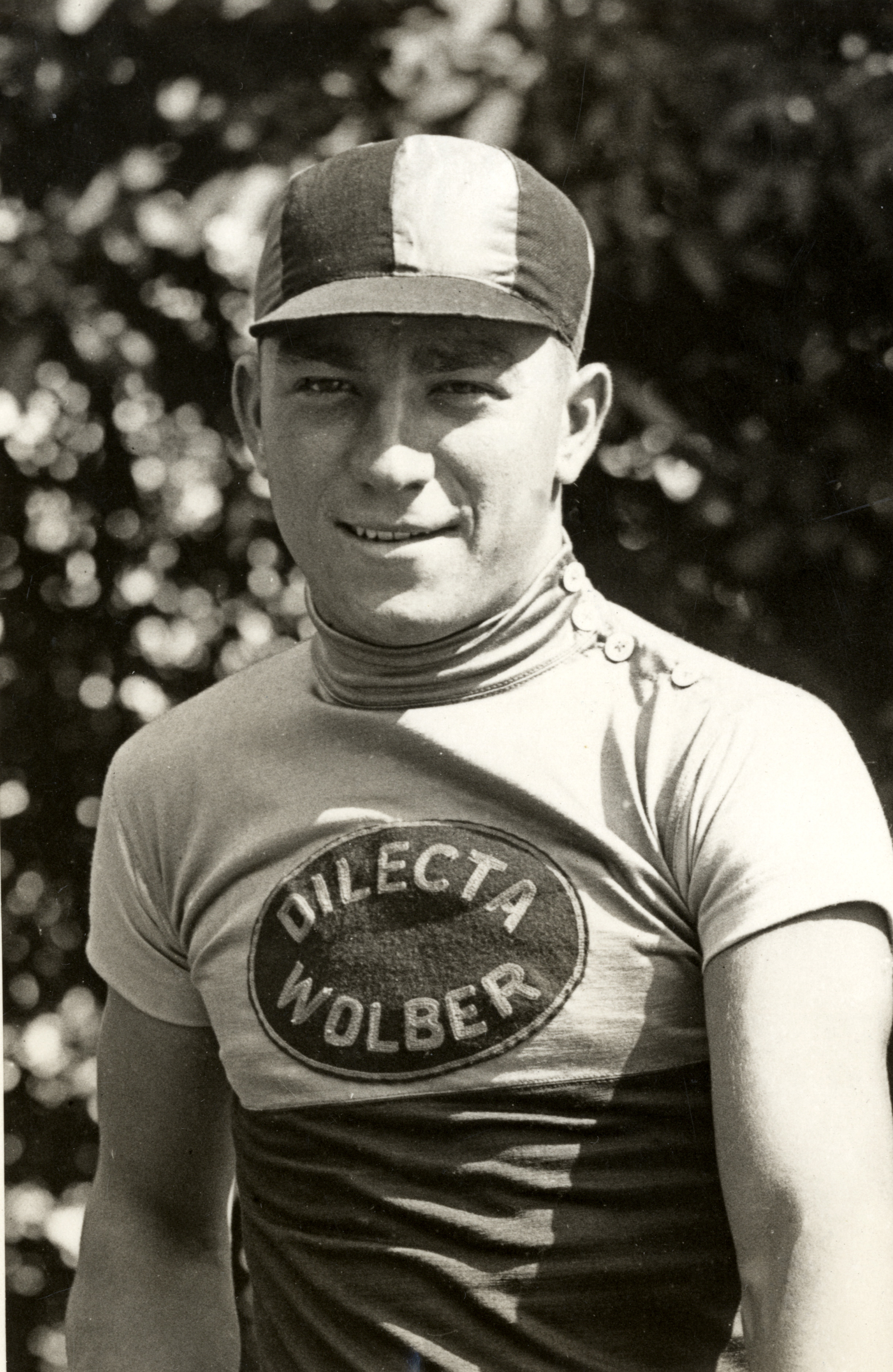
Jean Maréchal, member of the French team that became second in the team classification

Final team classification
Rank	Team	Time
1	Belgium	533h 19' 31"
2	France	+ 57' 19"
3	Germany	+ 3h 11' 38"
4	Australia/Switzerland	+ 3h 53' 54"
5	Italy	+ 4h 00' 06"

=== Other classifications ===
The organisers, from the newspaper l'Auto, named a meilleur grimpeur (best climber), an unofficial precursor to the modern King of the Mountains competition. This award was won by Jef Demuysere.

== Aftermath ==
After the Tour de France was over, the winner Antonin Magne was so tired that he had to rest for several weeks.

== Bibliography ==
- Augendre, Jacques (2016). Guide historique [Historical guide] (PDF) (in French). Paris: Amaury Sport Organisation. Archived (PDF) from the original on 17 August 2016.
- McGann, Bill; McGann, Carol (2006). The Story of the Tour de France: 1903–1964. Vol. 1. Indianapolis, IN: Dog Ear Publishing. ISBN 978-1-59858-180-5.
