= Spanish National Road Race Championships =

Spanish cycling championship

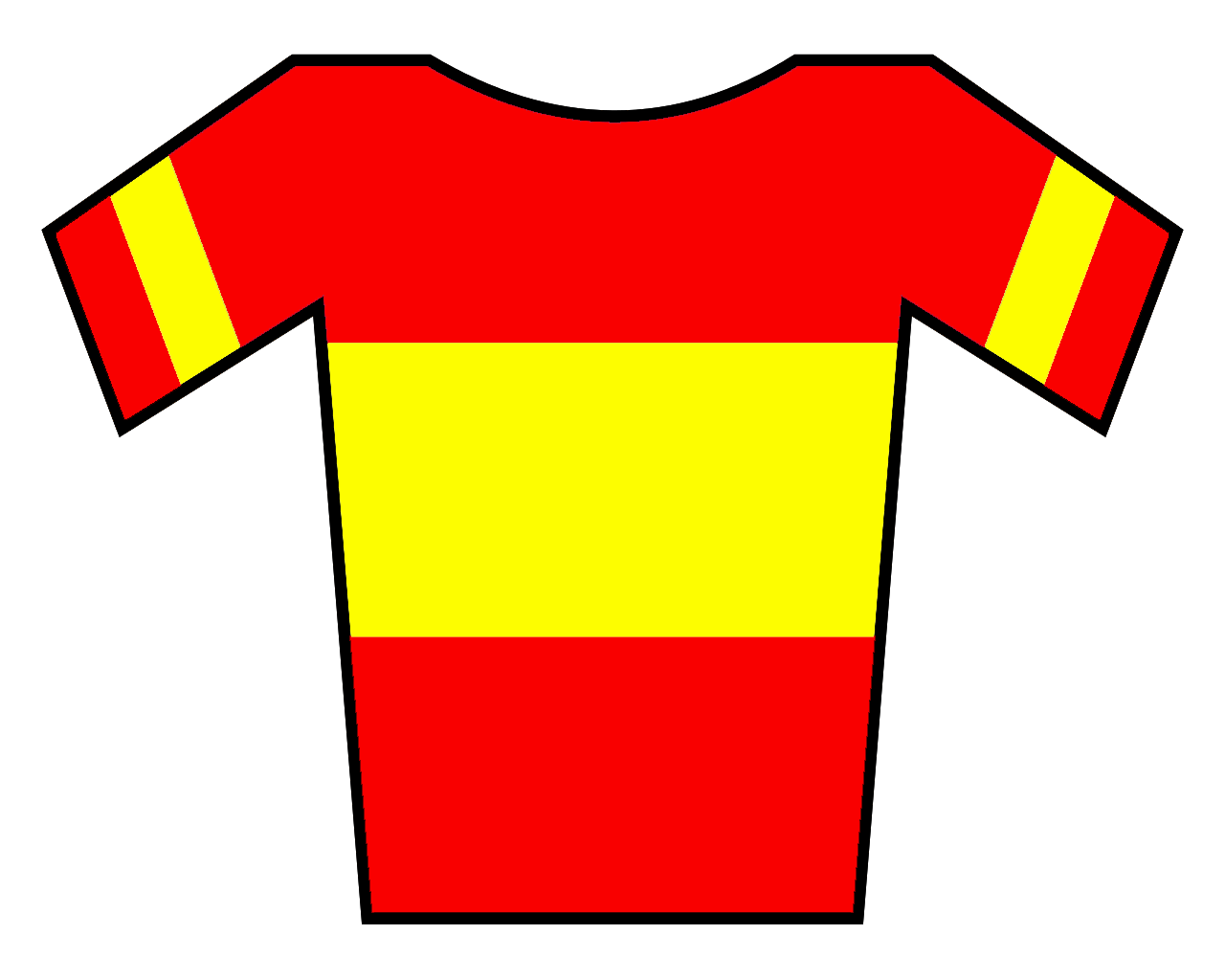
The champions jersey

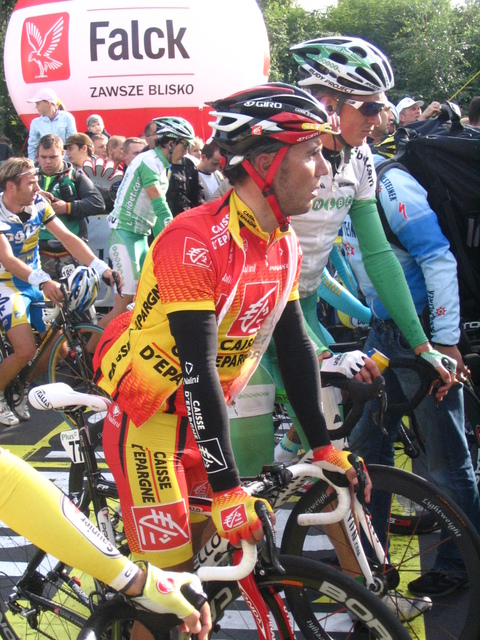
Joaquim Rodríguez, who won the men's title in 2007

The Spanish National Road Race Championships are held annually to decide the Spanish cycling champions in the road race discipline, across various categories. The event was first held in 1897 and was won by a Portuguese rider, José Bento Pessoa.

== Multiple winners ==
=== Men ===
Wins	Rider	Years
4	Mariano Cañardo	1930, 1931, 1933, 1936
3	Luciano Montero	1929, 1932, 1934
3	Julián Berrendero	1942, 1943, 1944
3	Bernardo Ruiz	1946, 1948, 1951
3	Antonio Suárez	1959, 1960, 1961
3	Alejandro Valverde	2008, 2015, 2019

=== Women ===
Wins	Rider	Years
5	Mavi García	2016, 2020, 2021, 2022, 2023
3	Mercedes Ateca	1979, 1980, 1981
3	María Isabel Moreno	2005, 2006, 2007
3	Rosa María Bravo	1998, 2000, 2011

== Men ==
=== Elite ===
Year	Gold	Silver	Bronze
1897	José Bento Pessoa	Juan Sugranes	Clemente Fabian
1898– 1901	Not held		
1902	Tomás Peñalva	Salvador Seguí	José Manuel Pekín and Miguel Bayona
1903	Ricardo Peris	Tomás Peñalva	Julio Álvarez
1904	Tomás Peñalva	Ricardo Peris	Julio Álvarez
1905	Pablo Pujol	José Pérez	Tomás Peñalva
1906	Luis Amuñategui	Juan Andrés Campesinos	Domingo Álvarez
1907	Luis Amuñategui	Tomás San Salvador	Marcelino Cuesta
1908	Vicente Blanco	Esteban Espinosa	Marcelino Cuesta
1909	Vicente Blanco	José Pérez	Otillo Borras
1910	José Magdalena	Otillo Borras	Jaime Durán
1911	Jaime Durán	Lázaro Villada	Sebastián Masdeu
1912	José Magdalena	Joaquín Martí	Antonio Crespo
1913	Juan Martí	Lorenzo Oca	Joaquín Larrañaga
1914	Óscar Leblanc	Antonio Crespo	José Magdalena
1915	Simón Febrer	Juan Zumalde	José Magdalena
1916	José Manchón	Óscar Leblanc	Bartolomé Roig
1917	Lázaro Villada	Óscar Leblanc	José Manchón
1918	Simón Febrer	Juan Martínez	Manuel Colchón
1919	Jaime Janer	Juan Martínez	Guillermo Antón
1920	Miguel Bover	Jaime Janer	José Saura
1921	Ramón Valentín	Miguel García	Guillermo Antón
1922	José Saura	José María Sanz	Miguel García
1923	Jaime Janer	Telmo García	Mució Miquel
1924	Juan Bautista Llorens	Telmo García	Teodoro Monteys
1925	Ricardo Montero	Jaime Janer	Telmo García
1926	José Saura	Juan Bautista Llorens	Ricardo Montero
1927	Mució Miquel	Telmo García	Francisco Cepeda
1928	Telmo García	Eduardo Fernández	José María Sanz
1929	Luciano Montero	José María Sanz	Sebastián Aguilar
1930	Mariano Cañardo	Luciano Montero	Vicente Bachero
1931	Mariano Cañardo	Antonio Escuriet	Josep Nicolau
1932	Luciano Montero	Mariano Cañardo	Salvador Cardona
1933	Mariano Cañardo	Luciano Montero	Vicente Bachero
1934	Luciano Montero	Mariano Cañardo	Salvador Cardona
1935	Salvador Cardona	Mariano Cañardo	Luciano Montero
1936	Mariano Cañardo	Luciano Montero	Mariano Gascón
1937	Not held		
1938	Fermín Trueba	Francisco Goenaga	Francisco Aresti
1939	Antonio Andrés Sancho	Mariano Cañardo	Vicente Trueba
1940	Fédérico Ezquerra	Diego Cháfer	Mariano Cañardo
1941	Antonio Andrés Sancho	Antonio Martín	Julián Berrendero
1942	Julián Berrendero	Antonio Andrés Sancho	Diego Cháfer
1943	Julián Berrendero	José Bejarano	Antonio Martín
1944	Julián Berrendero	Antonio Martín	Vicente Carretero
1945	Juan Gimeno	Joaquín Olmos	Delio Rodríguez
1946	Bernardo Ruiz	Antonio Andrés Sancho	Bernardo Capó
1947	Bernardo Capó	Bernardo Ruiz	Miguel Gual
1948	Bernardo Ruiz	Antonio Gelabert	Julián Berrendero
1949	José Serra Gil	Bernardo Capó	Julián Berrendero
1950	Antonio Gelabert	Bernardo Ruiz	José Vidal
1951	Bernardo Ruiz	Andrés Trobat	Victorio Ruiz García
1952	Andrés Trobat	José Mateo	Antonio Barrutia
1953	Francisco Masip	Andrés Trobat	Francisco Alomar
1954	Emilio Rodríguez	Bernardo Ruiz	Francisco Alomar
1955	Antonio Gelabert	José Escolano	José Serra
1956	Antonio Ferraz	Bernardo Ruiz	Francisco Masip
1957	Antonio Ferraz	René Marigil	Antonio Jiménez Quiles
1958	Federico Bahamontes	Salvador Botella	Jesús Loroño
1959	Antonio Suárez	Federico Bahamontes	Jesús Galdeano
1960	Antonio Suárez	Jesús Loroño	Fernando Manzaneque
1961	Antonio Suárez	Jesús Loroño	Federico Bahamontes
1962	Luis Otaño	José Pérez Francés	Manuel Martín Piñera
1963	José Pérez Francés	Miguel Pacheco	Fernando Manzaneque
1964	Julio Jiménez	José Luis Talamillo	Luis Otaño
1965	Antonio Gómez del Moral	José Antonio Momeñe	Gabriel Mas
1966	Luis Otaño	Carlos Echeverría	Ginés García
1967	Luis Santamarina	Carlos Echeverría	Ginés García
1968	Luis Ocaña	Antonio Gómez del Moral	Jesús Aranzábal
1969	Ramón Sáez	José Pérez Francés	José Antonio Momeñe
1970	José Antonio González Linares	Jesús Aranzábal	Nemesio Jiménez
1971	Eduardo Castelló	Andrés Gandarias	Domingo Perurena
1972	Luis Ocaña	Domingo Perurena	Agustín Tamames
1973	Domingo Perurena	José Luis Abilleira	Juan Zurano
1974	Vicente López Carril	Manuel Esparza	Antonio Menéndez
1975	Domingo Perurena	Francisco Elorriaga	Jaime Huélamo
1976	Agustín Tamames	Miguel María Lasa	José Viejo
1977	Manuel Esparza	José Nazabal	Jordi Fortià
1978	Enrique Martínez Heredia	Luis Alberto Ordiales	Antonio Menéndez
1979	~~Isidro Juárez~~	Faustino Rupérez	Miguel María Lasa
1980	Juan Fernández	Miguel María Lasa	Francisco Elorriaga
1981	Eulalio García	Enrique Martínez Heredia	Juan Fernández
1982	José Luis Laguía	Eulalio García	Federico Echave
1983	Carlos Hernández	Alfonso Gutiérrez	Antonio Coll
1984	Jesús Ignacio Ibáñez Loyo	Celestino Prieto	Eduardo Chozas
1985	José Luis Navarro	Pello Ruiz Cabestany	Javier Castellar
1986	Alfonso Gutiérrez	Ricardo Martínez	Manuel Jorge Domínguez
1987	Juan Carlos González Salvador	Alfonso Gutiérrez	Manuel Jorge Domínguez
1988	Juan Fernández	Manuel Jorge Domínguez	Jokin Mújika
1989	Carlos Hernández	Jesús Suárez Cueva	Casimiro Moreda
1990	Laudelino Cubino	Francisco Javier Mauleón	Miguel Induráin
1991	Juan Carlos González Salvador	José Luis Rodriguez Garcia	Manuel Jorge Domínguez
1992	Miguel Induráin	Jon Unzaga Bombín	Carlos Hernández
1993	Ignacio García Camacho	Miguel Induráin	Fernando Escartín
1994	Abraham Olano	Ángel Edo Alsina	Melcior Mauri Prat
1995	Jesús Montoya	José María Jiménez	Vicente Aparicio Vila
1996	Manuel Fernández Ginés	Abraham Olano	Fernando Escartín
1997	José María Jiménez	César Solaun	David Etxebarria
1998	Ángel Casero	Juan Carlos Domínguez	Óscar Freire
1999	Ángel Casero	Roberto Heras	Joseba Beloki
2000	Álvaro González de Galdeano	Francisco Cerezo	Ángel Edo
2001	Iván Gutiérrez	Santiago Blanco	Aitor Garmendia
2002	Juan Carlos Guillamón	Abraham Olano	Miguel Ángel Martín Perdiguero
2003	Rubén Plaza	Rafael Casero	Benjamín Noval
2004	Francisco Mancebo	Alejandro Valverde	Francisco José Lara
2005	Juan Manuel Gárate	Francisco Mancebo	Jordi Berenguer
2006	Race cancelled		
2007	Joaquim Rodríguez	Alejandro Valverde	Eladio Jiménez
2008	Alejandro Valverde	Óscar Sevilla	Óscar Pereiro
2009	Rubén Plaza	Constantino Zaballa	Alejandro Valverde
2010	Iván Gutiérrez	Francisco Ventoso	Koldo Fernández
2011	José Joaquín Rojas	Koldo Fernández	Jesús Herrada
2012	Francisco Ventoso	Koldo Fernández	Francisco José Pacheco
2013	Jesús Herrada	Ion Izagirre	Luis León Sánchez
2014	Ion Izagirre	Alejandro Valverde	Carlos Barbero
2015	Alejandro Valverde	Carlos Barbero	Jesús Herrada
2016	José Joaquín Rojas	Ángel Vicioso	Jordi Simón
2017	Jesús Herrada	Alejandro Valverde	Ion Izagirre
2018	Gorka Izagirre	Alejandro Valverde	Omar Fraile
2019	Alejandro Valverde	Luis León Sánchez	Jesús Herrada
2020	Luis León Sánchez	Gorka Izagirre	Vicente García de Mateos
2021	Omar Fraile	Jesús Herrada	Alex Aranburu
2022	Carlos Rodríguez	Jesús Herrada	Alex Aranburu
2023	Oier Lazkano	Juan Ayuso	Alex Aranburu
2024	Alex Aranburu	Oier Lazkano	Jesús Herrada
2025	Iván Romeo	Fernando Barceló	Roger Adrià
2026	Marcel Camprubí	Joel Nicolau	Urko Berrade

=== U23 ===
Year	Gold	Silver	Bronze
1999	Patxi Ugarte	Jesús Manzano	Samuel Sánchez
2000	David Arroyo	Xavier Tondo	Miguel Martínez
2001	Alejandro Valverde	Israel Nuñez	Javier Lindez
2002	Unai Elorriaga	Francisco Gutiérrez	Francisco Ventoso
2003	Isaac Escola	Pedro Castillo	Silvestre Callau
2004	Joseba Agirrezabala	José Luis Carrasco	Igor Antón
2005	Javier Moreno	Francisco González	Juan Carlos Fernández
2006	José David Aguilera	Luis Enrique Puertas	Serafín Martínez
2007	Carlos Delgado	Esteban Plaza	José Carlos López
2008	David Gutiérrez	Andrés Vigil	Ion Izagirre
2009	Pedro Merino	Airán Fernández	Higinio Fernández
2010	Albert Torres	Francisco García	David Serrano
2011	Román Osuna	Victor Martín	Haritz Orbe
2012	Ramón Domene	Cristobal Sánchez	Ibai Salas
2013	Mario González	Beñat Txoperena	Oscar Hernández
2014	Gonzalo Andrés	Francisco García	Carlos Jiménez
2015	Jaime Rosón	Xavier Pastallé	Óscar Pelegrí
2016	Óscar Pelegrí	Jon Irisarri	Juanjo Agüero
2017	Isaac Cantón	Álvaro Cuadros	Diego Pablo Sevilla
2018	Iñigo Elosegui	Carmelo Urbano	Gabriel Pons
2019	Carmelo Urbano	Arturo Gravalos	Oier Ibarguren
2020	Javier Romo	Jokin Murguialday	Eduardo Perez-Landaluce
2021	Iván Cobo	Marcel Camprubí	Unai Iribar
2022	Joseba López	José Marín	Abel Balderstone
2023	Unai Aznar	Josep Tomas	Francisco Muñoz
2024	Hugo de la Calle	César Pérez López	Martín Rey
2025	Yago Agirre	Iván Loaisa	Samuel Fernández

== Women ==
Year	Gold	Silver	Bronze
1979	Mercedes Ateca	Blanca Gil	María Victoria Fustero
1980	Mercedes Ateca	Antonia Quintanal	Ana Fernández
1981	Mercedes Ateca	Milagros Tugores	Margarita Gormals
1982	Carolina Sagarmendi	Margarita Gormals	Margarita Rico
1983	Carolina Sagarmendi	Immaculada de Carlos	María Quintanal
1984	María Luisa Izquierdo	Mercedes Ateca	Carolina Sagarmendi
1985	María Mora	Magdalena Rigo	María Luisa Izquierdo
1986	Magdalena Rigo	María Mora	María José Prada
1987	María Luisa Izquierdo	María Mora	Raquel Aberasturi
1988	Immaculada de Carlos	Consuelo Álvarez	Josune Gorostidi
1989	Consuelo Álvarez	Josune Gorostidi	Teodora Ruano
1990	Conchita Carbayeda	Raquel Aberasturi	Belén Cuevas
1991	Josune Gorostidi	Ainhoa Artolazábal	Conchita Carbayeda
1992	Ainhoa Artolazábal	Conchita Carbayeda	Belén Cuevas
1993	Alicia Amezgaray	Margarita Fullana	Joane Somarriba
1994	Joane Somarriba	Fátima Blázquez	Berta Fernández
1995	María José López	Rosario Corral	Izaskun Bengoa
1996	Izaskun Bengoa	Teodora Ruano	Joane Somarriba
1997	Izaskun Bengoa	Rosa María Bravo	Joane Somarriba
1998	Rosa María Bravo	Izaskun Bengoa	Teodora Ruano
1999	Margarita Fullana	Rosa María Bravo	Teodora Ruano
2000	Rosa María Bravo	Marta Vila Josana	Teodora Ruano
2001	Teodora Ruano	Anna Ramírez	María Isabel Moreno
2002	Arantzazu Azpiroz	Anna Ramírez	Maria Cagigas
2003	Eneritz Iturriaga	Rosa María Bravo	Joane Somarriba
2004	Anna Ramírez	Fátima Blázquez	Arantzazu Azpiroz
2005	María Isabel Moreno	Leticia Gil	Débora Gálves
2006	María Isabel Moreno	Eneritz Iturriaga	Cristina Alcalde
2007	María Isabel Moreno	Marta Vila Josana	Arantzazu Azpiroz
2008	Itsaso Leunda	Fátima Blázquez	Judit Masdeu
2009	Marta Vila Josana	Belén López	Leticia Gil
2010	Leire Olaberria	Débora Gálves	Rosa María Bravo
2011	Rosa María Bravo	Ana Ramírez	Silvia Tirado
2012	Anna Sanchis	Anna Ramírez	Ane Santesteban
2013	Ane Santesteban	Mayalen Noriega	Lucía González
2014	Anna Ramírez	Irene San Sebastián	Sheyla Gutiérrez
2015	Anna Sanchis	Ane Santesteban	Alicia González
2016	Mavi García	Anna Sanchis	Sheyla Gutiérrez
2017	Sheyla Gutiérrez	Mavi García	Ane Santesteban
2018	Eider Merino	Gloria Rodríguez	Mavi García
2019	Lourdes Oyarbide	Irene Méndez	Mireia Benito
2020	Mavi García	Ane Santesteban	Eider Merino
2021	Mavi García	Ane Santesteban	Sara Martín
2022	Mavi García	Sandra Alonso	Iurani Blanco
2023	Mavi García	Sara Martín	Mireia Benito
2024	Usoa Ostolaza	Yurani Blanco	Mavi García
2025	Sara Martín	Mavi García	Usoa Ostolaza
2026	Mireia Benito	Sara Martín	Paula Ostiz

== See also ==
- Spanish National Time Trial Championships
- National road cycling championships
