= Spanish National Time Trial Championships =

National road cycling championship in Spain

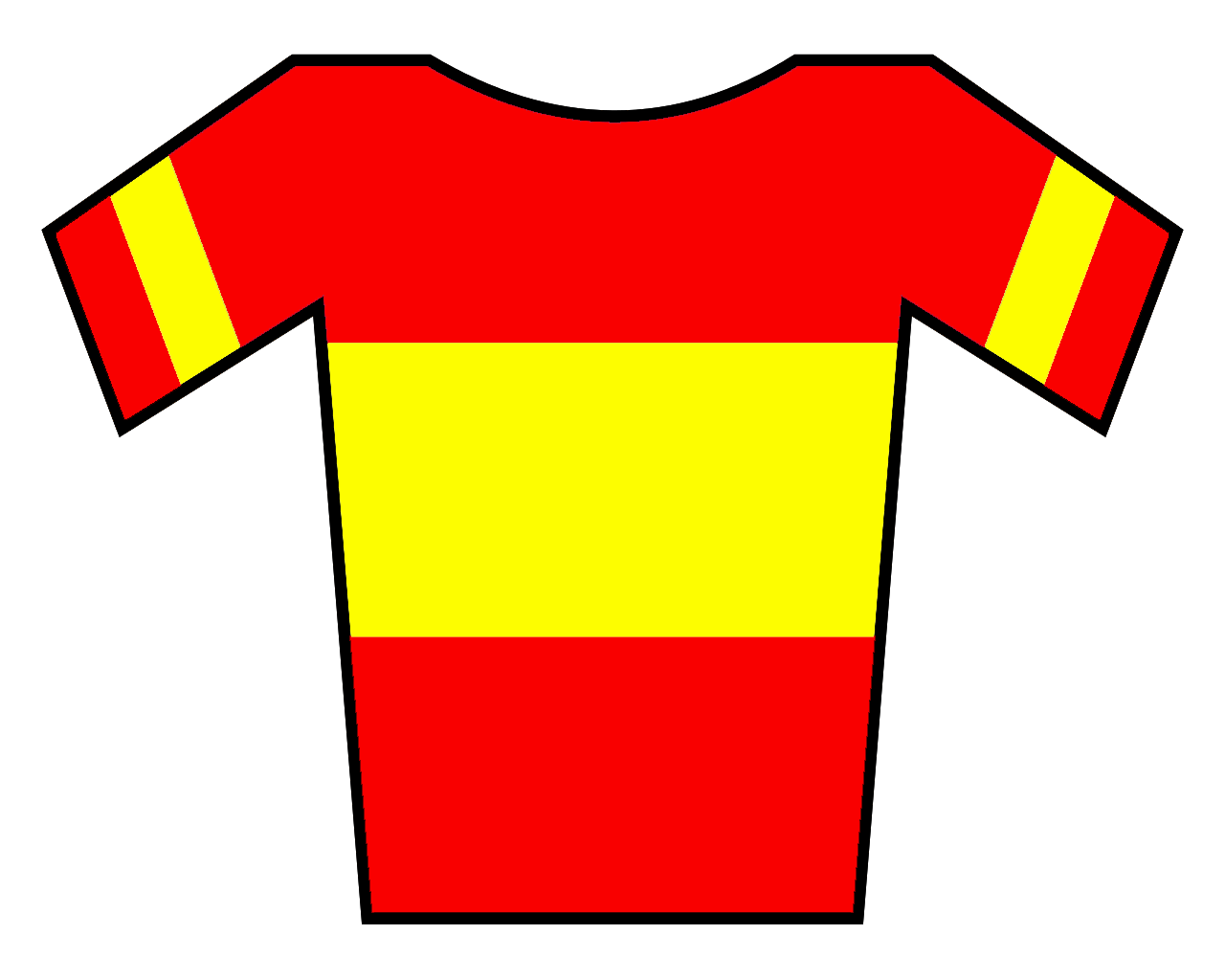

The Spanish National Time Trial Championship (Spanish: Campeonato de España de Ciclismo Contrarreloj) is a time trial race that takes place inside the Spanish National Cycling Championship, and decides the best cyclist in this type of race. The time trial championships in Spain have not been held for as long as the Spanish National Road Race Championships, which first took place in 1897. The first race winner of the time trial championship was Abraham Olano in 1994. Jonathan Castroviejo holds the record for the most wins in the men's championship with five titles, followed by Iván Gutiérrez and Luis León Sánchez, with both riders winning four titles. The women's record is held by Teodora Ruano with 7 wins. The current champions are Raúl García Pierna and Margarita Victoria García.

== Multiple winners ==
=== Men ===
Wins	Rider	Years
6	Jonathan Castroviejo	2013, 2015, 2017, 2018, 2019, 2023
4	Iván Gutiérrez	2000, 2004, 2005, 2007
4	Luis León Sánchez	2008, 2010, 2011, 2012
2	Abraham Olano	1994, 1998
2	Santos González	1999, 2001
2	Ion Izagirre	2016, 2021

=== Women ===
Wins	Rider	Years
6	Teodora Ruano	1995, 1998, 1999, 2001, 2003, 2004
4	Eneritz Iturriaga	2002, 2005, 2006, 2011
4	Anna Sanchis	2012, 2013, 2015, 2016
4	Margarita Victoria García	2018, 2020, 2021, 2022

== Men ==
=== Elite ===
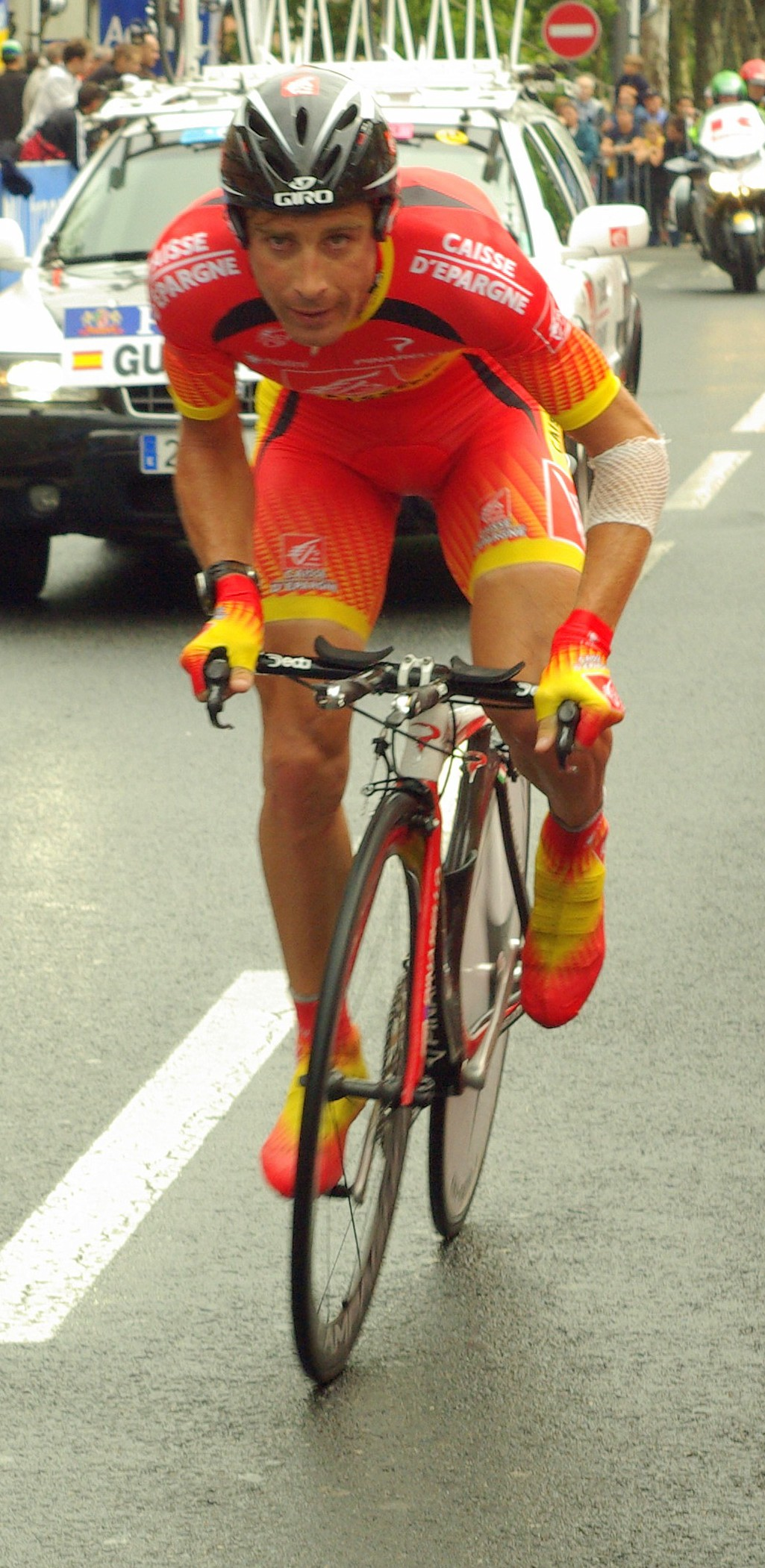
Iván Gutiérrez won the title four times between 2000 and 2007

Year	Gold	Silver	Bronze
1994	Abraham Olano	Marino Alonso	Aitor Garmendia
1995	Melcior Mauri	Ángel Casero	Aitor Garmendia
1996	Iñigo González de Heredia	Álvaro González de Galdeano	Jaime Hernández
1997	José Enrique Gutiérrez	Joseba Beloki	Juan Carlos Taboas
1998	Abraham Olano	Melcior Mauri	Ángel Casero
1999	Santos González	Ángel Casero	Álvaro González de Galdeano
2000	Iván Gutiérrez	David Plaza	Álvaro González de Galdeano
2001	Santos González	Toni Tauler	Sergio Escobar
2002	Igor González de Galdeano	Toni Tauler	Álvaro González de Galdeano
2003	Íñigo Chaurreau	Toni Tauler	Mikel Astarloza
2004	Iván Gutiérrez	Luis León Sánchez	Igor González de Galdeano
2005	Iván Gutiérrez	Santos González	Rubén Plaza
2006	Toni Tauler	Rubén Plaza	David Herrero
2007	Iván Gutiérrez	Luis León Sánchez	Manuel Lloret
2008	Luis León Sánchez	Rubén Plaza	Iván Gutiérrez
2009	Alberto Contador	Luis León Sánchez	Rubén Plaza
2010	Luis León Sánchez	Iván Gutiérrez	Rubén Plaza
2011	Luis León Sánchez	Jonathan Castroviejo	Iván Gutiérrez
2012	Luis León Sánchez	Jonathan Castroviejo	Alejandro Marque
2013	Jonathan Castroviejo	Luis León Sánchez	Rubén Plaza
2014	Alejandro Valverde	Ion Izagirre	Jonathan Castroviejo
2015	Jonathan Castroviejo	Gorka Izagirre	Jesús Herrada
2016	Ion Izagirre	Jonathan Castroviejo	Alejandro Valverde
2017	Jonathan Castroviejo	Mikel Landa	Jesús Herrada
2018	Jonathan Castroviejo	Gorka Izagirre	Ion Izagirre
2019	Jonathan Castroviejo	Pello Bilbao	Gorka Izagirre
2020	Pello Bilbao	Luis León Sánchez	Gorka Izagirre
2021	Ion Izagirre	David de la Cruz	Carlos Rodríguez
2022	Raúl García Pierna	Oier Lazkano	Xabier Azparren
2023	Jonathan Castroviejo	Oier Lazkano	Lluís Mas
2024	David de la Cruz	Markel Beloki	Raúl García Pierna
2025	Abel Balderstone	David de la Cruz	Raúl García Pierna
2026	Pablo Castrillo	Xabier Azparren	Pablo Torres

=== U23 ===
Year	Gold	Silver	Bronze
2003	Juan José Cobo	Victor Gómez	Manuel Lloret
2004	Eladio Sánchez	Hernán Ponce	Carlos Abellán
2005	José Luis Ruiz	Unai Uribarri	José Antonio Redondo
2006	Javier Chacón	José Maria Alcaraz	Luis Enrique Puertas
2007	Rafael Serrano	Sergio Domínguez	Héctor González
2008			
2009	Aser Estevez	Garikoitz Bravo	Arturo Mora
2010	Jesús Herrada	Andres Vigil	Albert Torres
2011	Mario González	Igor Merino	Omar Fraile
2012	Marcos Jurado	Albert Torres	Alberto Just
2013	Alberto Just	Marcos Jurado	Mario González
2014	Óscar González	Juan Camacho	Marc Soler
2015	Diego Tirilonte	Cristián Rodríguez	Álvaro Trueba
2016	Martín Bouzas	Gonzalo Serrano	Óscar González
2017	Jaime Castrillo	Sergio Samitier	Martín Bouzas
2018	Martín Bouzas	Roger Adrià	Joan Bennassar
2019	Mikel Azparren	Martín Bouzas	Joan Bennassar
2020	Raúl García Pierna	Jokin Murguialday	Iván Cobo
2021	Igor Arrieta	Pablo García	Enekoitz Azparren
2022	Pablo Castrillo	Pablo García	Fernando Tercero
2023	Unai Aznar	Hugo Aznar	Javier Ibáñez
2024	Aitor Agirre Egaña	Alberto Fernández Reviejo	Luis García
2025	Adrian Fajardo Toledo	Unai Ramos	Iker Soriano

== Women ==
=== Elite ===
Year	Gold	Silver	Bronze
1995	Teodora Ruano	Nuria Florencio	Izaskun Bengoa
1996	Joane Somarriba	Teodora Ruano	Izaskun Bengoa
1997	Izaskun Bengoa	Joane Somarriba	Teodora Ruano
1998	Teodora Ruano	Izaskun Bengoa	Marta Vila Josana
1999	Teodora Ruano	Gema Pascual	Marta Vila Josana
2000			
2001	Teodora Ruano	Gema Pascual	Ruth Martinez
2002	Eneritz Iturriaga	Teodora Ruano	Marta Vila Josana
2003	Teodora Ruano	Eneritz Iturriaga	María Isabel Moreno
2004	Teodora Ruano	Eneritz Iturriaga	Maria Cagigas
2005	Eneritz Iturriaga	Teodora Ruano	María Isabel Moreno
2006	Eneritz Iturriaga	María Isabel Moreno	Marta Vila Josana
2007	María Isabel Moreno	Marta Vila Josana	Gema Pascual
2008			
2009	Débora Gálves Lopez	Gema Pascual	Leire Olaberria
2010	Leire Olaberria	Rosa María Bravo	Débora Gálves Lopez
2011	Eneritz Iturriaga	Anna Sanchis	Belen López
2012	Anna Sanchis	Mayalen Noriega	Belen López
2013	Anna Sanchis	Leire Olaberria	Belen López
2014	Leire Olaberria	Belén López	Anna Ramírez
2015	Anna Sanchis	Sheyla Gutiérrez	Leire Olaberria
2016	Anna Sanchis	Gloria Rodríguez	Margarita Victoria García
2017	Lourdes Oyarbide	Mavi García	Sheyla Gutiérrez
2018	Margarita Victoria García	Eider Merino	Alicia González
2019	Sheyla Gutiérrez	Lourdes Oyarbide	Gloria Rodríguez
2020	Margarita Victoria García	Sara Martín	Sheyla Gutiérrez
2021	Margarita Victoria García	Sara Martín	Lourdes Oyarbide
2022	Margarita Victoria García	Sheyla Gutiérrez	Sandra Alonso
2023	Mireia Benito	Margarita Victoria García	Sandra Alonso
2024	Mireia Benito	Sandra Alonso	Margarita Victoria García
2025	Mireia Benito	Usoa Ostolaza	Ariana Gilabert
2026	Mireia Benito	Sara Martín	Sandra Alonso

== See also ==
- Spanish National Road Race Championships
- National road cycling championships
