= Eneritz Iturriaga =

Spanish cyclist (born 1980)

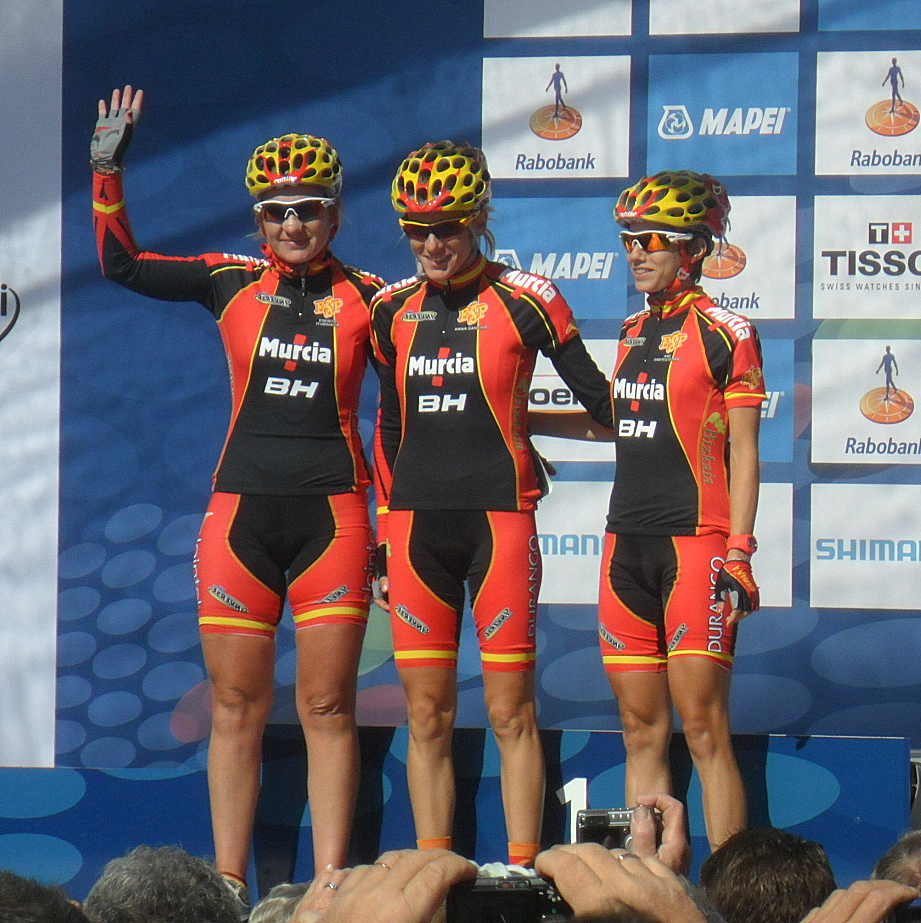
- At the 2012 UCI Road World Championships

Personal information
- Full name: Eneritz Iturriagaetxebarria Mazaga
- Born: 16 September 1980 (age 46) Abadiño, Basque Country
- Height: 168 cm (5 ft 6 in)

Cycling career
- Sport: Cycling
- Current team: Eneicat–CMTeam
- Discipline: Road
- Role: Rider (retired); Directeur sportif

Amateur teams
- 1997: Cafés Baqué
- 1998–2000: Ciclos Iturriaga
- 2005: Orbea
- 2009: Cespa–Euskadi

Professional teams
- 2001: Bik–Toscany Sport
- 2002: Pragma–Deia–Colnago
- 2003: Team 2002 Aurora–RSM
- 2004: Team Let's Go Finland
- 2006: Top Girls Fassa Bortolo Raxy Line
- 2007: Menikini–Selle Italia–Gysko
- 2008–2010: Safi–Pasta Zara–Manhattan
- 2011–2012: Lointek

Managerial teams
- 2015: BZK Emakumeen Bira
- 2019–: Eneicat

Major wins
- National Time Trial Championships (2002, 2005, 2006 & 2011); National Road Race Championships (2003)

Eneritz Iturriagaetxebarria Mazaga (sometimes translated as Iturriagaechevarria or Iturriaga Echevarri; born 16 September 1980 in Abadiño, Basque Country) is a Spanish former racing cyclist. She now works as a directeur sportif for UCI Women's Continental Team Eneicat–CMTeam.

She participated in the 2012 UCI Road World Championships.

== Major results ==
2002
1st National Time Trial Championships
2003
1st National Road Race Championships
1st Stage 1 Emakumeen Euskal Bira
2004
1st Stage 5 Holland Ladies Tour
2005
1st National Time Trial Championships
2006
1st National Time Trial Championships
2008
1st Stage 6 Trophée d'Or Féminin
2009
3rd Overall La Route de France
2011
1st National Time Trial Championships
