= José Bento Pessoa =

Portuguese cyclist

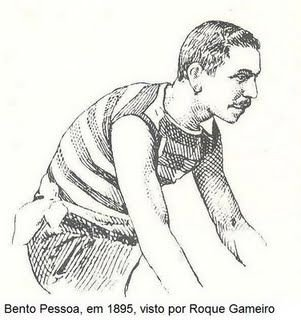
- Bento Pessoa in 1895 by Roque Gameiro

Personal information
- Born: 7 March 1874 Figueira da Foz, Portugal
- Died: 7 July 1954 (aged 80) Lisbon, Portugal

Cycling career
- Sport: Cycling
- Disciplines: cycling (track and road)
- Role: rider
- Rider type: track specialist

Amateur teams
- 1895: Brennabor
- 1896: Brennabor

Professional teams
- 1897: Raleigh
- 1898: Raleigh
- 1899: Raleigh
- 1900: Raleigh
- 1901: Raleigh
- 1905: Clement

Major wins
- 500m Track Cycling World Record (1897); 68 victories in 68 cycling races in Spain (1897); Spanish National Road Championships (1897); Portugal National Speed Championship (1897); Portugal National Speed Championship (1901); Portugal National Speed Championship (1905)

José Bento Pessoa (7 March 1874 – 7 July 1954) was a Portuguese cyclist. He was the holder of the 500m world record, that in 1897 won the Spanish National Road Race Championships. José was also a founding partner of the Ginásio Club Figueirense. The official name of Estádio Municipal José Bento Pessoa was given in his honor.

== Career ==
From 1892 to 1905, with a break from 1902 to 1905, Pessoa raced in Spain; Paris; Ghent, Belgium; Geneva, Switzerland; Turin, Italy; Berlin; and Pará, Brazil. In Spain he raced in Vigo, A Coruña, Seville, Bilbao, Salamanca, Ávila, and Madrid. He lived in Madrid for eight months and in Paris for two years.

In May 1897, at the inauguration of the Chamartín velodrome in Madrid, he won the international competition and beat the world record of the 500 meters, which belonged to Edmond Jacquelin, lowering the time from 34.6 to 33.2 seconds. In Spain, he became an idol, having won all 68 races he entered. On April 10, 1898, at the Velodrome of Geneva, before 20,000 people, he beat the Swiss champion Théodore Champion. He would win other races in Paris, Berlin and perhaps the highest point of his career, the Zimmerman Grand Prix – at the time the most important cycling race in Europe, created in honor of Arthur Augustus Zimmerman – beating the world champion Willy Arend.

He won a large number of medals and art objects, and among the pecuniary prizes he obtained was what he won in Pará - 10.000 strong escudos (43.75£). When the news of the victories came to his land, the enthusiasm of the figueirenses spread in noisy and festive manifestations: the philharmonic came out, the facade of the Prince Theater illuminated, there were marches, au flambeaux - a madness. And when the champion came to rest - half Figueira was going to party him. He even went from the train station to home into the shoulders of the most enthusiastic. This happened, for example, when, shortly after the defeat of Bento Pessoa, at the feasts of St. John of 1901, he returned from Oporto, where he had twice overthrown José Dionísio at the Velodrome Maria Amélia. (...) On September 1, 1901, the country's cycling clubs paid tribute to the great champion. In order to receive a message and a toast, the cyclist-bureau "Lisboa-Figueira" was organized. José Bento Pessoa was not only a world champion, the greatest speed cyclist of his time, but also a competent coach.

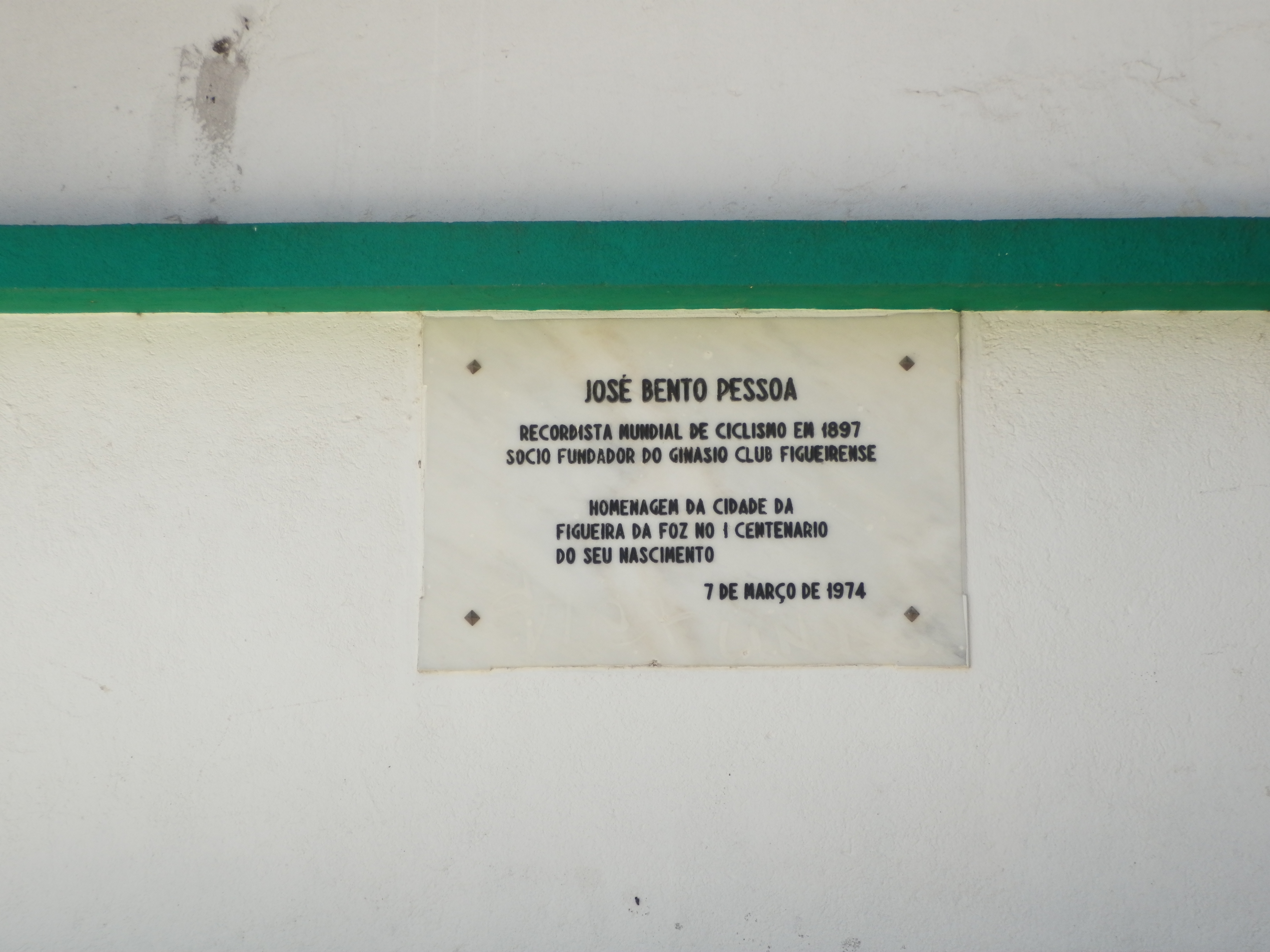
Plaque honoring Bento Pessoa
