= Unai Uribarri =

Spanish cyclist

Personal information
- Full name: Unai Uribarri Artabe
- Born: 28 February 1984 (age 42) Mañaria, Spain

Cycling career
- Sport: Cycling
- Current team: Retired
- Discipline: Road
- Role: Rider

Professional teams
- 2006–2007: Euskaltel–Euskadi
- 2008: Orbea–Oreka SDA

Unai Uribarri Artabe (born 28 February 1984 in Mañaria, Basque Country) is a Spanish former professional road bicycle racer, who rode professionally between 2006 and 2008 for the Euskaltel–Euskadi and Orbea–Oreka SDA teams.

== Major results ==
2005
2nd Time trial, National Under-23 Road Championships
