= Anna Sanchis =

Spanish cyclist

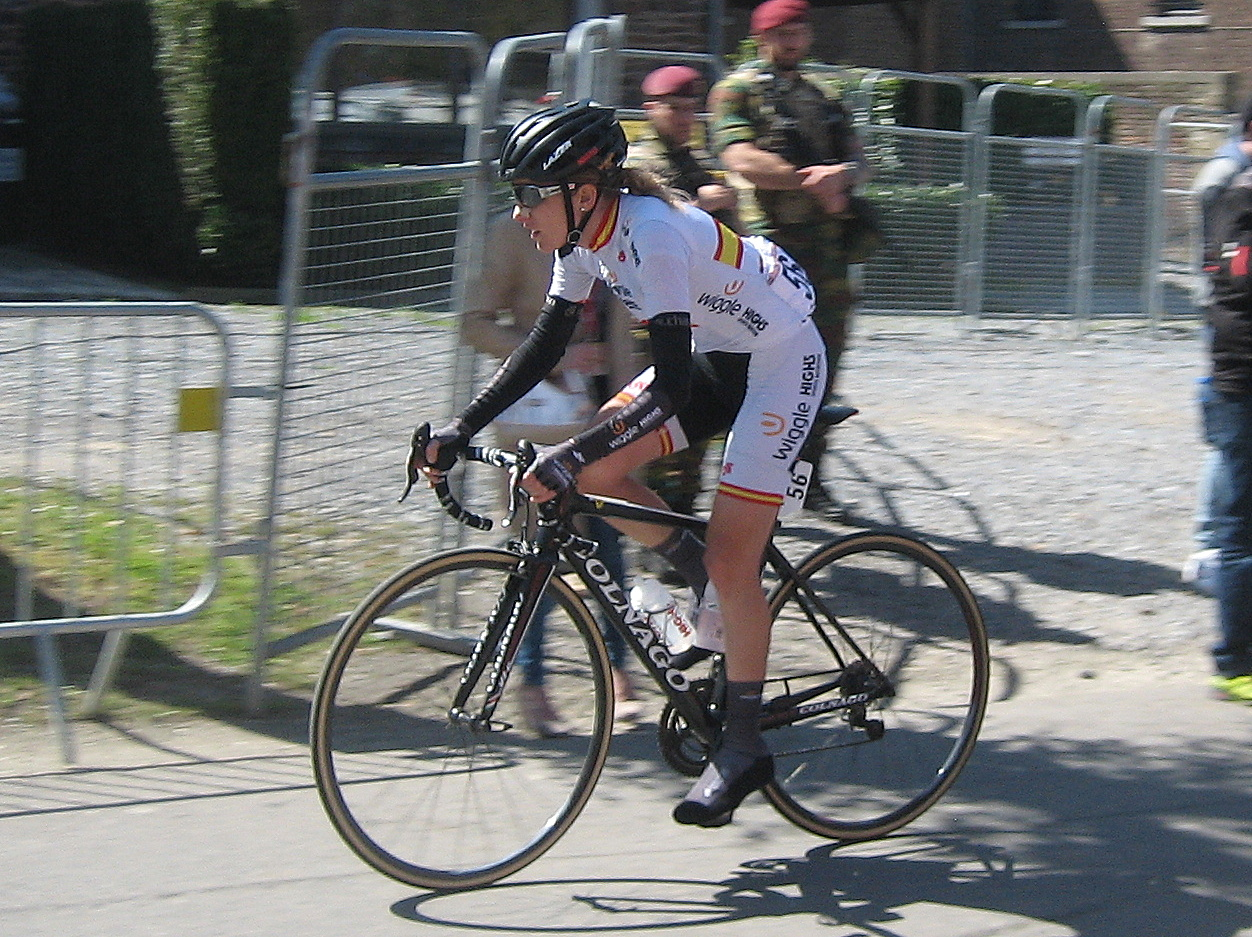
- Sanchis at the 2016 La Flèche Wallonne Féminine

Personal information
- Born: 18 October 1987 (age 38) Genovés, Valencia, Spain

Cycling career
- Sport: Cycling
- Current team: Retired
- Discipline: Road
- Role: Rider

Professional teams
- 2007–2008: Comunidad Valenciana
- 2009: Safi–Pasta Zara–Titanedi
- 2010–2013: Bizkaia–Durango
- 2014–2017: Wiggle–Honda

Major wins
- One day races National Road Race Championships (2012, 2015) National Time Trial Championships (2012–2013, 2015–2016)

Anna Sanchis (born 18 October 1987) is a Spanish former racing cyclist. She competed in the women's road race at the 2008 Summer Olympics.

== Major results ==
2005
National Junior Road Championships

1st Time trial
2nd Road race

2008
1st Estella
2nd Time trial, National Road Championships
7th Overall Giro d'Italia Femminile
8th Road race, UEC European Under-23 Road Championships
2011
2nd Time trial, National Road Championships
2012
National Road Championships

1st Time trial
1st Road race

9th Overall Emakumeen Euskal Bira
2013
National Road Championships

1st Time trial
9th Road race

2015
National Road Championships

1st Time trial
1st Road race

8th Giro dell'Emilia Internazionale Donne Elite
2016
National Road Championships

1st Time trial
2nd Road race

7th Grand Prix de Plumelec-Morbihan Dames
8th La Classique Morbihan
