= Sara Martín =

Spanish cyclist

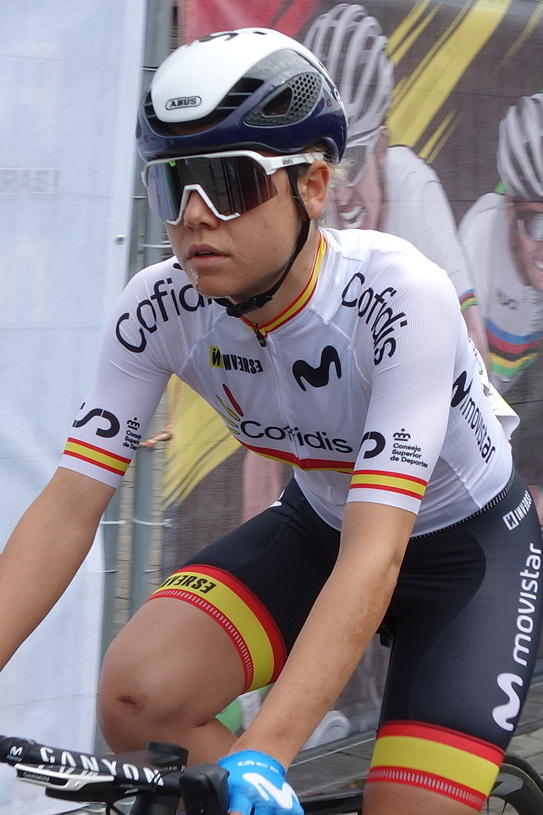
- Martín at the 2021 World Championships

Personal information
- Full name: Sara Martín Martín
- Born: 22 March 1999 (age 27) Aranda de Duero, Spain
- Height: 1.69 m (5 ft 6 1/2 in)
- Weight: 57 kg (126 lb; 9 st 0 lb)

Cycling career
- Sport: Cycling
- Current team: Movistar Team
- Discipline: Road
- Role: Rider
- Rider type: All-rounder

Professional teams
- 2018–2020: Sopela Women's Team
- 2021–: Movistar Team

Sara Martín Martín (born 22 March 1999) is a Spanish professional racing cyclist, who currently rides for UCI Women's WorldTeam Movistar Team.

== Major results ==
2017
National Junior Road Championships

1st Road race
1st Time trial

2018
6th Time trial, Mediterranean Games
10th Road race, National Road Championships
2019
2nd Time trial, National Under–23 Road Championships
8th La Périgord Ladies
9th Time trial, National Road Championships
2020
National Road Championships

2nd Time trial
5th Road race

2021
National Road Championships

2nd Time trial
3rd Road race

7th Ronde de Mouscron
2022
National Road Championships

4th Time trial
4th Road race

7th Overall Vuelta Ciclista Andalucia Ruta Del Sol
