= Manuel Lloret =

Spanish cyclist

Personal information
- Full name: Manuel Lloret Zaragoza
- Born: August 4, 1981 (age 45) Muro de Alcoy, Spain

Cycling career
- Sport: Cycling
- Current team: Retired
- Discipline: Road
- Role: Rider

Amateur team
- 2009: Valencia Tierra y Mar

Professional teams
- 2005–2006: Comunidad Valenciana
- 2007: Fuerteventura–Canarias
- 2008: Barbot–Siper

Manuel Lloret Zaragoza (born August 4, 1981, in Muro de Alcoy) is a Spanish cyclist.

== Palmarès ==
2006
1st stage 2 Vuelta a Andalucía
3rd Volta ao Distrito de Santarém
2007
1st Vuelta a la Comunidad de Madrid

1st stage 2

3rd Vuelta a Murcia
3rd Volta ao Alentejo
3rd Spanish National Time Trial Championships
2008
2nd Vuelta a Extremadura

1st stage 4

2009
1st stage 1 Cinturón a Mallorca
1st prologue Vuelta a Zamora
