= María Isabel Moreno =

Spanish cyclist

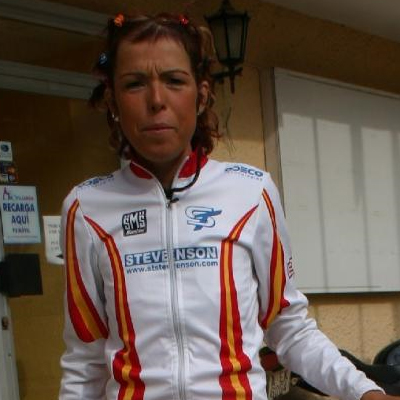

Personal information
- Full name: Maria Isabel Moreno Allue
- Nickname: Maribel
- Born: 2 January 1981 (age 45)
- Height: 1.60 m (5 ft 3 in)
- Weight: 52 kg (115 lb)

Cycling career
- Sport: Cycling
- Discipline: Road
- Role: Rider

Professional teams
- 2002: Pragma - Deia - Colnago
- 2007: Comunidad Valenciana
- 2008: MultiCaja CC Sabiñánigo

María Isabel Moreno Allue (Maribel Moreno) (born 2 January 1981) is a Spanish road bicycle racer from Ribes de Freser, Girona.

== Doping ==
Moreno was due to compete in the Women's road race at the 2008 Summer Olympics in Beijing on 10 August, but did not start having been tested positive for EPO. Moreno arrived in Beijing on 31 July and was immediately tested. She fled the country for Spain that same day, having suffered a panic attack. The positive test results were announced on 11 August, making Moreno the first athlete to test positive for a banned substance at the 2008 Olympic Games.

== Palmarès ==
2001
1st GP Tolosa

2001
3rd Spanish National Road Race Championships

2002
1st GP Pavie

2003
3rd Spanish National Time Trial Championships
3rd European Time Trial Championships, U23
3rd European Road Race Championships, U23

2005
1st (Spain) Spanish National Road Race Championships
3rd Spanish National Time Trial Championships
2nd Stage 3a, Tour Féminin en Limousin, Chaptelat
3rd GP International Féminin 'Les Forges'

2006
1st (Spain) Spanish National Road Race Championships
2nd Spanish National Time Trial Championships

2007
1st (Spain) Spanish National Road Race Championships
1st (Spain) Spanish National Time Trial Championships
3rd Giro d'Italia Femminile

2nd Stage 3, Giro d'Italia Femminile, Prato a Calc

1st Tour de l'Ardèche

1st Stage 2, Tour de l'Ardèche, de Vals les Bains
2nd Stage 4, Tour de l'Ardèche, Privas
2nd Stage 5, Tour de l'Ardèche, Villeneuve de Berg

2008
2nd Trofeo Cantimpalos

== See also ==
- List of doping cases in cycling
