= Cycling at the 2008 Summer Olympics – Women's individual road race =

Women's cycling road race at the Games of the XXIX Olympiad
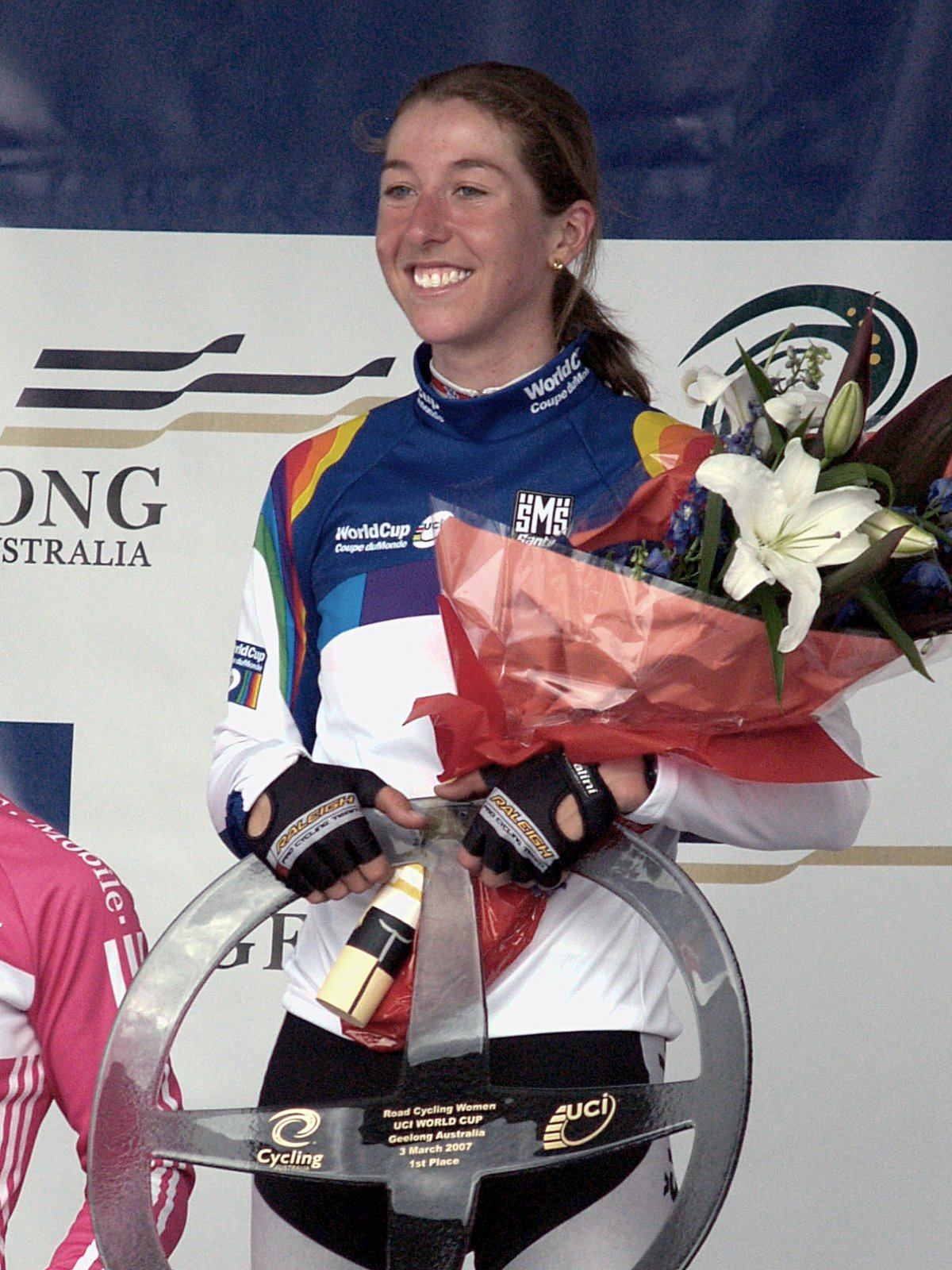
- Nicole Cooke, gold medalist
- Venue: Urban Road Cycling Course; 102.6 km (63.8 mi)
- Date: 10 August 2008
- Competitors: 66 from 33 nations
- Winning time: 3:32:24; 35.71 km/h (22.19 mph)

Medalists
| 1st place, gold medalist(s) | | Nicole Cooke; Great Britain |
| 2nd place, silver medalist(s) | | Emma Johansson; Sweden |
| 3rd place, bronze medalist(s) | | Tatiana Guderzo; Italy |

The women's road race was one of the cycling events at the 2008 Summer Olympics in Beijing, China. It took place on 10 August 2008, featuring 66 women from 33 countries. It was the seventh appearance of an Olympic women's road race event and featured a longer course than any of the previous six races. The race was run on the Urban Road Cycling Course (one of Beijing's nine temporary venues), which is 102.6 kilometres (63.8 mi) total. Including a second lap around the 23.8 km (14.8 mi) final circuit, the total distance of the women's race was 126.4 km (78.5 mi), less than half the length of the men's race.

Heavy rain during most of the race made conditions difficult for the competitors. A group of five broke away during the final lap and worked together until the final sprint, where Nicole Cooke won the race. Cooke earned Great Britain's first medal at these Games and 200th Olympic gold medal overall. Emma Johansson of Sweden and Tatiana Guderzo of Italy, finishing second and third place with the same time as Cooke, received silver and bronze medals respectively.

The race marked the first positive drug test of the 2008 Olympic Games, by María Isabel Moreno of Spain. She was scheduled to compete in this event and the time trial to follow, but left Beijing on 31 July, before the race. The International Olympic Committee said on 11 August that she had tested positive for EPO. This left 66 cyclists to compete, one fewer than in 2004.

== Qualification ==
The 2008 Summer Olympics marked the seventh appearance of an Olympic women's road race event. Qualification for the race was restricted to three athletes per National Olympic Committee (NOC) for the 16 top-ranked countries in overall Union Cycliste Internationale (UCI) standings at 1 June 2008, and a maximum of two athletes each for the countries ranking 17–24. An NOC with an athlete in the top 100 at 31 May 2008 received a place, which was taken from the countries ranked 17–24 in reversed order, provided that these athletes qualified through the UCI World Tour rankings. Additionally, three places were available at the B World Championship for NOCs that did not qualify through the UCI standing; Gu Sun-Geun, Hae Ok-Jeong and Thatsani Wichana secured Olympic qualification for their NOCs in this way, but only the first was chosen by her national committee to compete. The maximum quota of the event was set at 67 cyclists, and as of 5 June, 66 cyclists were qualified in this way. Although the Chinese and Austrian NOCs were allowed to enter three cyclists, they only entered two. This left three open positions: two were allotted to South Africa and New Zealand, based on their World Tour rankings, and the third was given to Mauritius by direct invitation. Only 66 of the 67 entrants began the race, as María Isabel Moreno of Spain left the country days earlier after failing a drug test.

== Preview ==
Judith Arndt, the German rider who finished second at the 2004 Summer Olympics, was a strong favourite. Arndt had recently finished first at the 2008 Coupe du Monde Cycliste Féminine de Montréal, and her form in the months that preceded the race was excellent. Among other contenders were UCI Women's Road standings leader, Marianne Vos of the Netherlands; Briton Nicole Cooke, who said she had greater confidence in her team on this occasion than in 2004, when she finished fifth; and Noemi Cantele of Italy. The Australian team was considered strong: it included Sara Carrigan (the defending champion), Oenone Wood (winner of the 2008 Australian Road Race), and Katherine Bates, all of whom could work on each other's behalf. Because the final leg of the course involved steep ramps, riders considered to be climbing experts (including Cooke, Vos, and Susanne Ljungskog) were favoured. Although not seen as a strong medal contender, one former champion participating in the race was 49-year-old Jeannie Longo from France, who won the road race in 1996 and had competed in the inaugural event in 1984, making this her seventh appearance.

Many cyclists expected tropical conditions during the race and adjusted their training to compensate. For example, Marianne Vos prepared in El Salvador. Cyclists had also anticipated a problem with high levels of pollution in Beijing, but these did not appear to affect the results of the men's road race. Although the pollution levels in Beijing on 10 August far exceeded the World Health Organization's safety level, the rain during the women's race decreased the smog level.

In the men's race, conducted the previous day, humidity and heat had taken the greatest toll on the athletes. To compensate for the expected warm weather, some female cyclists chose not to wear undershirts. This proved to be a misjudgment, as conditions were cooler in the Great Wall section than on the previous day—19 °C (66 °F) compared to 26 °C (79 °F). Thunderstorms, bringing persistently heavy rain and strong winds, resulted in actual race conditions far different from expected. Other riders, such as Katherine Bates (who did not finish), prepared by wearing cooling vests before the race and stocked up on ice packs during it.

== Course ==
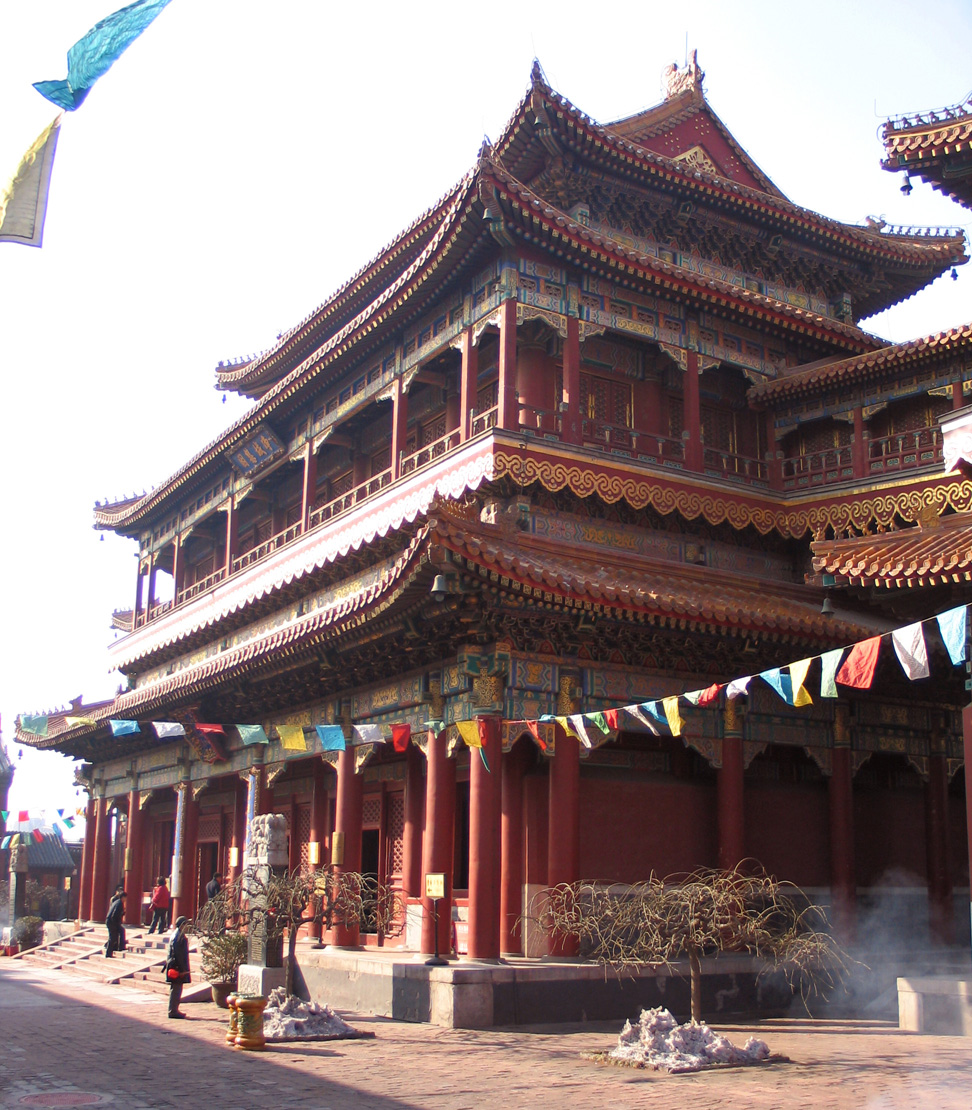
The Yonghe Temple

The race was run on the Urban Road Cycling Course (one of Beijing's nine temporary venues), which was 102.6 km (63.8 mi) in its entirety. Unlike the previous Olympic races, the start and finish were not at the same location. The early section of the race took place within central Beijing; the gradient of this part of the race was relatively flat. After approximately 78.8 km (49.0 mi), the riders reached the Badaling section of the Great Wall and began two loops of 23.8 km (14.8 mi) between the Badaling and Juyong Passes. The gradient increased at this point, as the Badaling Pass gained 338.2 m (1,110 ft) in elevation 12.4 km (7.7 mi) from the start of the circuit to the highest point, including ramps as steep as a 10 percent gradient. From there the cyclists rode over a false flat before descending a highway towards the Juyong Pass. The final 350.0 m (1,148.3 ft) were a moderately steep climb, designed to ensure an exciting finale should several riders be grouped together at the end of the race. In total, the distance of the women's race was 126.4 km (78.5 mi), less than half the length of the men's race.

The race's starting line was at the Yongdingmen Gate, a remnant of Beijing's old city wall, which is a part of the Chongwen District of northern Beijing. The route passed through eight districts: Chongwen, Xuanwu, Dongcheng, Xicheng, Chaoyang, Haidian, Changping, and Yanqing. Landmarks such as the Temple of Heaven, the Great Hall of the People, Tiananmen Square, the Yonghe Temple, and sections of the Great Wall of China were passed as the course journeyed from urban Beijing into the countryside. It passed the architectural features of the 2008 Olympics, including the Beijing National Stadium and Beijing National Aquatics Center (known colloquially as the Bird's Nest and the Water Cube). The course ended at the Juyong Pass in the Changping District. The course's scenery was described by The Guardian as "visually sumptuous".

Due to security regulations put in place by the Olympic organisers, spectators were not permitted to stand roadside along the course. Several prominent figures in cycling protested against this decision, including UCI president Pat McQuaid and two Australian riders, Stuart O'Grady and Cadel Evans, who competed in the men's race. McQuaid and O'Grady felt that the absence of people along the course deprived the race of the atmosphere present at other cycling events, and said that it failed to take supporters' wishes into consideration. Cycling Australia's reaction to the cyclists' complaints was to request that security restrictions be eased for the time trial to follow, but this plea was ignored.

== Race ==
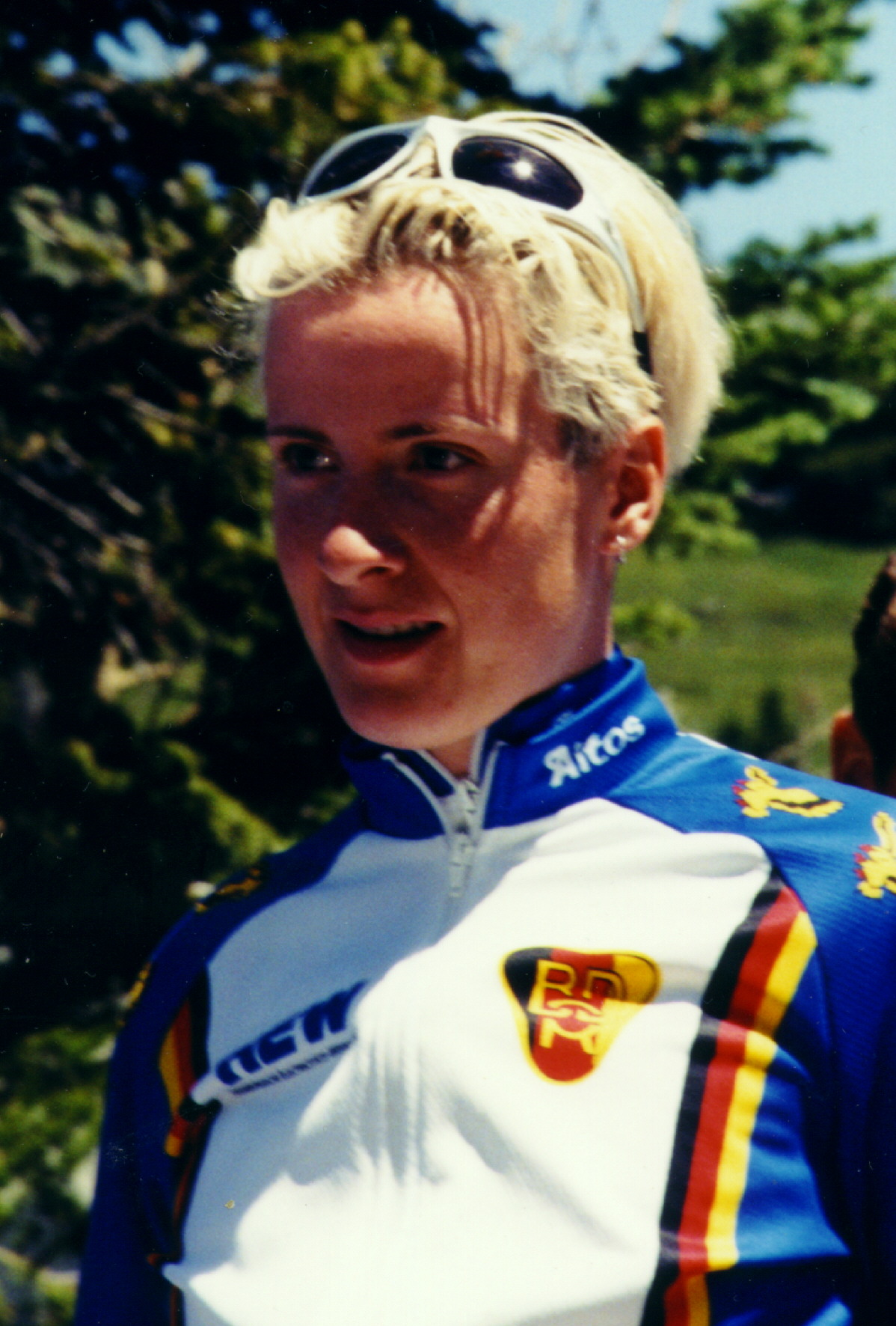
Judith Arndt, one of the pre-race favourites

The race started at 14:00 China Standard Time (UTC+8), and was scheduled to last until 17:30. The weather was unseasonably cool. It was cloudy and the roads were dry at the start of the race. The clouds brought steady rainfall midway through the race, making conditions challenging.

The race saw some incidents which caused riders to lose valuable time. Gu Sun-Geun (South Korea) lost control of her bike, bringing others down with her. She eventually fell into a concrete ditch on the side of the highway. Natalia Boyarskaya (Russia), who had built a lead of 59 seconds over the top of Badaling, had to stop to see which way to choose at a poorly marked intersection.

The chase for Boyarskaya was led by Christine Thorburn (United States), who brought the lead down to 34 seconds prior to the final loop of 23.8 km (14.8 mi). Emma Pooley (Great Britain) and Tatiana Guderzo (Italy) rode away from the bunch on the climb and caught Boyarskaya with 22 km (14 mi) to go, forming a three rider breakaway. The German team, with a steady pace, caught them soon after. Guderzo attacked with about 13 km (8.1 mi) to go over the final summit. She was soon joined by Christiane Soeder (Austria), Emma Johansson (Sweden), Nicole Cooke (Great Britain) and Linda Villumsen (Denmark). With 7 km (4.3 mi) remaining, the group had gained 16 seconds on the main peloton. Marianne Vos (Netherlands), one of the pre-race favourites who was not in the leading group, hesitated before leading the chase together with other pre-race favourite Judith Arndt. Cooke looked out of contention as the five came round the final bend, but she came around the other riders with 200 metres (660 ft) to go, claiming the gold medal with a clear margin. Johansson came in second and Guderzo won the bronze. Vos eventually led the bunch over the finish line, 21 seconds after the winner.

It was later revealed that Cooke had held back intentionally, as she was using lightweight tyres not suited to rainy conditions. The British women's road team manager Julian Winn said "We were afraid someone might come down in front of her, so we told her to keep to the left. We knew she would chew them up after that." Cooke's victory was the result of meticulous planning, as the team had ridden the course before the race and formulated the winning plan.

== Doping incident ==
The day after the race, an International Olympic Committee (IOC) spokesperson announced that Spanish rider María Isabel Moreno had become the first athlete of the 2008 Olympics to test positive for a banned substance. Moreno had provided a urine sample the day she arrived in Beijing (31 July), but flew back to Madrid on the same day, after suffering a panic attack, and did not return to take part in the race. The urine sample tested positive for erythropoietin (EPO). The IOC stripped Moreno of her Games accreditation, later referring the matter to the UCI which confirmed the positive result. A statement on Moreno's website read that "she does not feel ready to justify or explain her reasons for leaving the [Olympic] village".

== Final classification ==
A total of 66 cyclists have been qualified in the event at these Games. Most of them are not expected to finish one-day races, having worked in support for their teams (in this case, nations) to place riders with better climbing skills in good positions once the mountainous part of a course begins. Additionally, any rider lapped by the race leader on the Badaling circuit would be forced to stop, although this situation did not occur. The notation "s.t." indicates that the rider crossed the finish line in the same group as the cyclist before her, and was therefore credited with the same finishing time.

| Rank | Rider | Country | Time |
|---|---|---|---|
| 1st place, gold medalist(s) | Nicole Cooke | Great Britain | 3:32:24 |
| 2nd place, silver medalist(s) | Emma Johansson | Sweden | s.t. |
| 3rd place, bronze medalist(s) | Tatiana Guderzo | Italy | s.t. |
| 4 | Christiane Soeder | Austria | 3:32:28 |
| 5 | Linda Villumsen | Denmark | 3:32:32 |
| 6 | Marianne Vos | Netherlands | 3:32:45 |
| 7 | Priska Doppmann | Switzerland | s.t. |
| 8 | Paulina Brzeźna | Poland | s.t. |
| 9 | Edita Pučinskaitė | Lithuania | s.t. |
| 10 | Zulfiya Zabirova | Kazakhstan | s.t. |
| 11 | Jolanta Polikevičiūtė | Lithuania | s.t. |
| 12 | Yuliya Martisova | Russia | s.t. |
| 13 | Christel Ferrier-Bruneau | France | s.t. |
| 14 | Maryline Salvetat | France | s.t. |
| 15 | Noemi Cantele | Italy | s.t. |
| 16 | Gao Min | China | 3:32:52 |
| 17 | Leigh Hobson | Canada | s.t. |
| 18 | Nicole Brändli | Switzerland | s.t. |
| 19 | Anna Sanchis | Spain | s.t. |
| 20 | Trixi Worrack | Germany | s.t. |
| 21 | Susanne Ljungskog | Sweden | s.t. |
| 22 | Yevheniya Vysotska | Ukraine | 3:32:55 |
| 23 | Emma Pooley | Great Britain | s.t. |
| 24 | Jeannie Longo | France | 3:32:57 |
| 25 | Kristin Armstrong | United States | 3:33:07 |
| 26 | Anita Valen de Vries | Norway | 3:33:17 |
| 27 | Modesta Vžesniauskaitė | Lithuania | s.t. |
| 28 | Joanne Kiesanowski | New Zealand | s.t. |
| 29 | Oenone Wood | Australia | s.t. |
| 30 | Grete Treier | Estonia | s.t. |
| 31 | Miho Oki | Japan | s.t. |
| 32 | Tetyana Styazhkina | Ukraine | s.t. |
| 33 | Amber Neben | United States | s.t. |

| Rank | Rider | Country | Time |
|---|---|---|---|
| 34 | Marissa van der Merwe | South Africa | s.t. |
| 35 | Sharon Laws | Great Britain | s.t. |
| 36 | Mirjam Melchers | Netherlands | s.t. |
| 37 | Erinne Willock | Canada | 3:33:23 |
| 38 | Sara Carrigan | Australia | 3:33:25 |
| 39 | Hanka Kupfernagel | Germany | s.t. |
| 40 | Natalia Boyarskaya | Russia | 3:33:45 |
| 41 | Judith Arndt | Germany | 3:33:51 |
| 42 | Oksana Kashchyshyna | Ukraine | 3:34:13 |
| 43 | Alexandra Burchenkova | Russia | 3:36:32 |
| 44 | Lieselot Decroix | Belgium | 3:36:35 |
| 45 | Alessandra Grassi | Mexico | s.t. |
| 46 | Monika Schachl | Austria | 3:36:37 |
| 47 | Chantal Beltman | Netherlands | 3:37:02 |
| 48 | Meng Lang | China | 3:37:42 |
| 49 | Sigrid Corneo | Slovenia | 3:39:29 |
| 50 | Alexandra Wrubleski | Canada | 3:39:36 |
| 51 | Clemilda Fernandes | Brazil | 3:41:01 |
| 52 | Christine Thorburn | United States | 3:41:08 |
| 53 | Catherine Cheatley | New Zealand | s.t. |
| 54 | Danielys García | Venezuela | 3:43:25 |
| 55 | Marta Vilajosana | Spain | s.t. |
| 56 | Sara Mustonen | Sweden | s.t. |
| 57 | Angie González | Venezuela | s.t. |
| 58 | Gu Sun-Geun | South Korea | 3:45:59 |
| 59 | Cherise Taylor | South Africa | 3:48:33 |
| 60 | Yumari González | Cuba | 3:51:39 |
| 61 | Chanpeng Nontasin | Thailand | 3:51:51 |
| 62 | Aurelie Halbwachs | Mauritius | 3:52:11 |
| − | Jennifer Hohl | Switzerland (Note: Crashed.) | DNF |
| − | Katherine Bates | Australia (Note: Retired at 3:03 after teamwork in opening phase.) | DNF |
| − | Vera Carrara | Italy (Note: Retired at 3:03 after teamwork in opening phase.) | DNF |
| − | Son Hee-Jung | South Korea (Note: Crashed.) | DNF |

=== Notes ===
- Source: Official results
