= Marta Vila Josana =

Spanish cyclist

Marta Vilajosana Andreu
Personal information
- Full name: Marta Vilajosana Andreu
- Born: March 13, 1975 (age 51)
- Height: 1.70 m (5 ft 7 in)
- Weight: 57 kg (126 lb)

Cycling career
- Sport: Cycling
- Discipline: Road
- Role: Rider

Professional teams
- 2001: Alkon - Groupbike
- 2002: Aliverti Immobilione Kookai Luca
- 2003: Catalunya Aliverti Kookai
- 2005: SS Lazio Ciclismo Team Ladispoli
- 2006: Nobili Rubinetterie Menikini Cogeas
- 2007–: Cmax - Dila

Marta Vilajosana Andreu (born 13 March 1975) is a Spanish road bicycle racer. She competed in the Women's road race at the 2008 Summer Olympics in Beijing where she finished 55th.

== Palmarès ==
1998
3rd Spanish National Time Trial Championships

1999
3rd Spanish National Time Trial Championships

2001
1st Stage 3, Vuelta a Castilla y León

2002
3rd Spanish National Time Trial Championships

2005
4th Vuelta a Castilla y León
1st Stage 5, Giro del Trentino Alto Adige - Südtirol

2006
3rd Spanish National Time Trial Championships
2nd Vuelta a El Salvador

3rd Stage 1, Vuelta a El Salvador, Santa Ana
3rd Stage 4, Vuelta a El Salvador, Multiplaza
2nd Stage 6, Vuelta a El Salvador, El Boqueron

1st Stage 5, Giro d'Italia Femminile, Pescia

2007
2nd Spanish National Road Race Championships
2nd Spanish National Time Trial Championships
3rd Stage 1, Tour Féminin en Limousin, Landouge
1st Stage 3, Tour Féminin en Limousin, Saint-Yrieix-La-Perche
1st Prologue, Vuelta Ciclista Femenina a el Salvador, Calle Nueva A Huizucar
3rd Stage 1, Vuelta Ciclista Femenina a el Salvador, Nahuizalco
2nd Stage 3a, Vuelta Ciclista Femenina a el Salvador, Multiplaza

2008
4th GP de Santa Ana

2009
1st Spanish National Road Race Championships
