= Carmelo Urbano =

Spanish cyclist

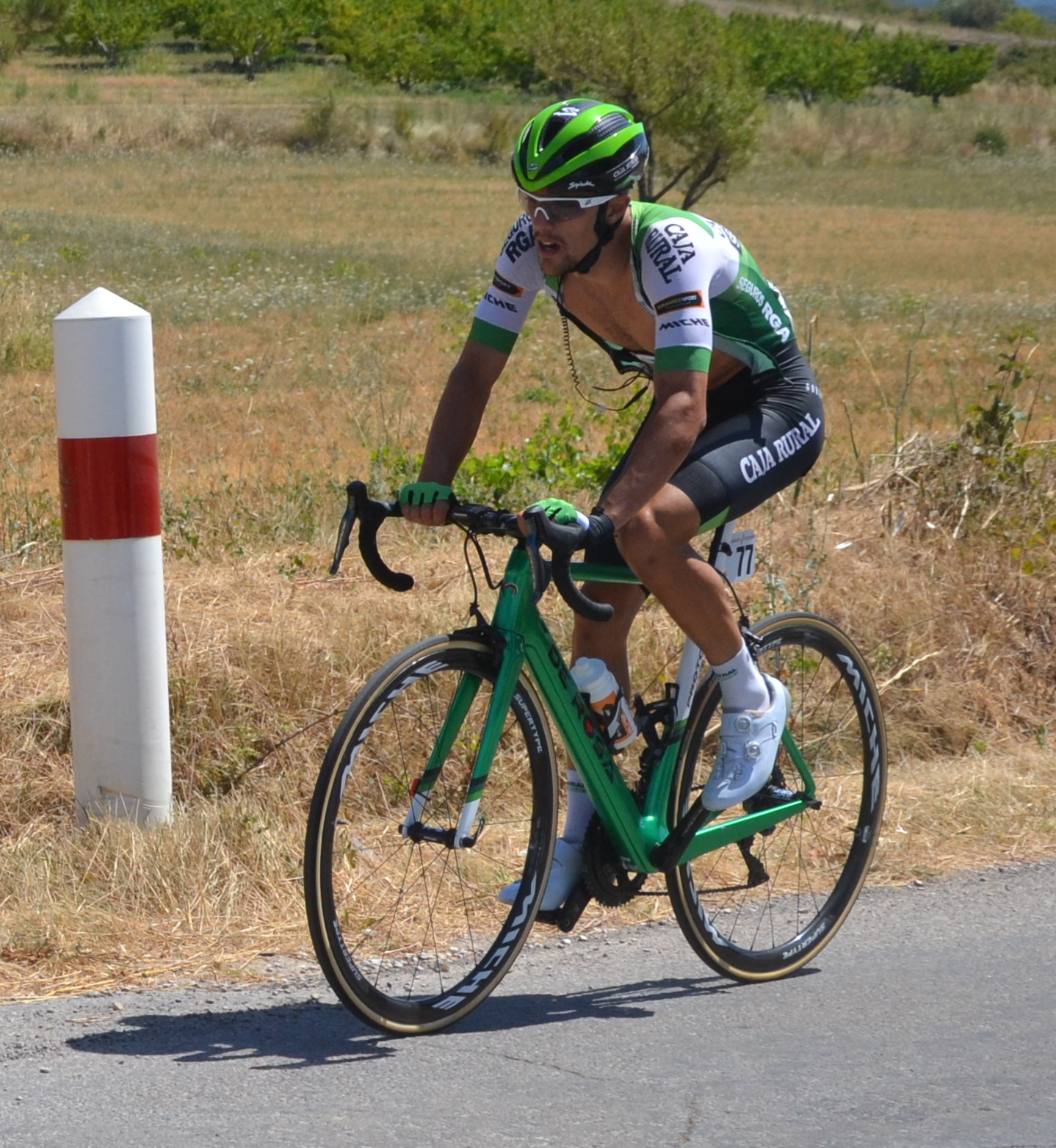
- Urbano at the 2020 Mont Ventoux Dénivelé Challenge

Personal information
- Full name: Carmelo Urbano Fontiveros
- Born: 3 February 1997 (age 29) Coín, Spain
- Height: 1.78 m (5 ft 10 in)
- Weight: 62 kg (137 lb)

Cycling career
- Sport: Cycling
- Current team: Caja Rural–Seguros RGA
- Discipline: Road
- Role: Rider

Amateur teams
- 2017–2018: Bicicletas Rodríguez–Extremadura
- 2019: Caja Rural–Seguros RGA Amateur

Professional team
- 2020–: Caja Rural–Seguros RGA

Carmelo Urbano Fontiveros (born 3 February 1997 in Coín) is a Spanish cyclist, who currently rides for the UCI ProTeam Caja Rural–Seguros RGA.

== Major results ==
2018
2nd Road race, National Under–23 Road Championships.
2019
1st Road race, National Under–23 Road Championships.
