= Carlos Abellán =

Spanish cyclist

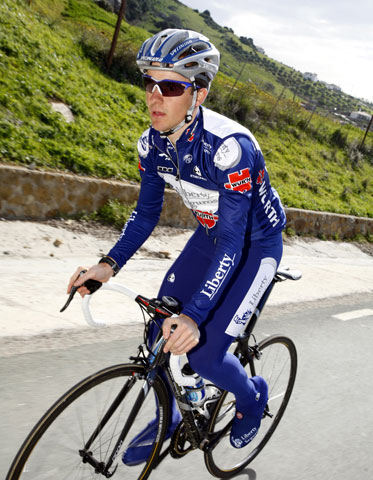
- Abellán in 2006

Personal information
- Full name: Carlos Abellán Ossenbach
- Born: 1 March 1983 (age 43) Madrid, Spain

Cycling career
- Sport: Cycling
- Current team: Retired
- Discipline: Road
- Role: Rider

Amateur team
- 2004–2005: Liberty Seguros–Würth U23

Professional team
- 2006: Liberty Seguros–Würth

Carlos Abellán Ossenbach (born 1 March 1983) is a former Spanish cyclist.

== Career ==
Abellán joined the development team of Liberty Seguros in 2004. In his second year with the team, he won the Clasica San Rokillo, a one-day race. In 2006, he turned professional with Liberty Seguros–Würth, a UCI ProTour team, spending only one season with the team. In 2007 he returned to the amateur ranks, and won the national amateur time trial championships. Abellán then ended his career.

== Major results ==
2005
1st Clasica San Rokillo
2007
1st National Amateur Time trial Championships
