= Gloria Rodríguez =

Spanish cyclist

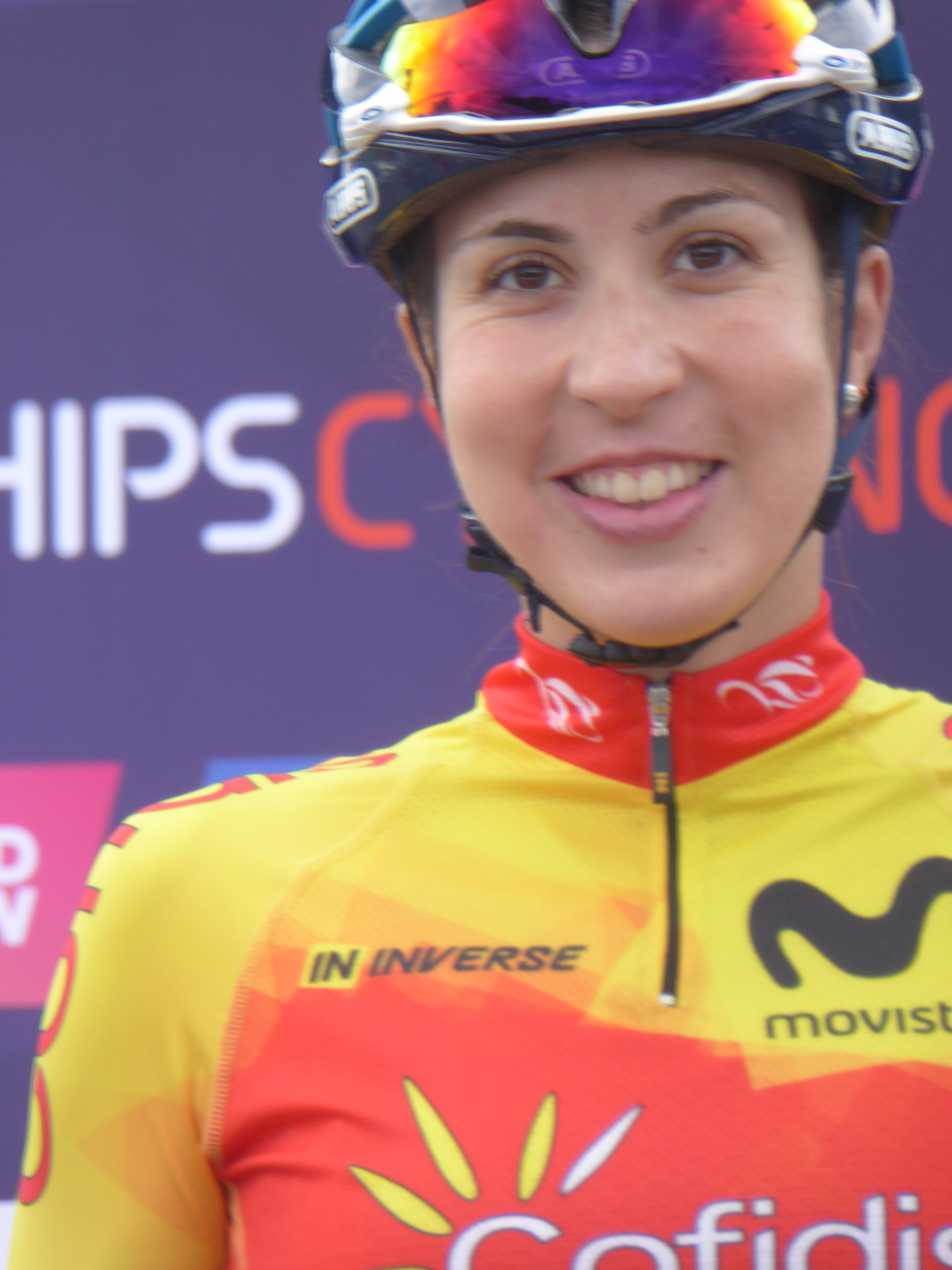
- Rodríguez at the 2018 European Road Cycling Championships.

Personal information
- Full name: Gloria Rodríguez Sánchez
- Born: 6 March 1992 (age 34) Torre-Pacheco, Spain

Cycling career
- Sport: Cycling
- Current team: Movistar Team
- Disciplines: Road; Track
- Role: Rider
- Rider type: Domestique (road); Endurance (track)

Professional teams
- 2012–2013: Bizkaia–Durango
- 2015: BZK Emakumeen Bira
- 2016–2017: Lointek
- 2018–: Movistar Team

Gloria Rodríguez Sánchez (born 6 March 1992) is a Spanish road and track cyclist, who currently rides for UCI Women's WorldTeam Movistar Team. She represented her nation at the 2015 UCI Track Cycling World Championships.

== Major results ==
2012
2nd Meruelo
8th Time trial, National Road Championships
2013
7th Time trial, National Road Championships
2014
National Road Championships

4th Time trial
8th Road race

4th Bembibre
4th Balmaseda
8th Trofeu Fira d'Agost Xativa
2015
1st Overall Gipuzkoako Emakumeen Itzulia

1st Stage 1 (ITT)

2nd Overall Vuelta a Burgos Feminas
2nd Trofeo Roldan
3rd Larrabasterra
4th Matiena-Abadiño
4th Elorrio Time Trial
6th Trofeo Ria de Marin
6th Balmaseda
7th Road race, National Road Championships
8th Iurreta
8th Zalla
9th Trofeo Zamora
2016
1st Trofeo Roldan
National Road Championships

2nd Time trial
4th Road race

2017
1st Time trial, Murcian Road Championships
1st Larrabasterra
3rd Overall Volta a Valencia
National Road Championships

4th Time trial
9th Road race

4th Berriatua
10th Bergara Time Trial
2018
1st Vuelta a Murcia
1st Trofeo Roldan
National Road Championships

2nd Road race
4th Time trial

2019
3rd Time trial, National Road Championships
2020
8th Time trial, National Road Championships
2022
8th Time trial, National Road Championships
