= Estádio Municipal José Bento Pessoa =

Stadium in Figueira da Foz, Portugal

Coordinates: 40°09′45.63″N 8°51′33.73″W

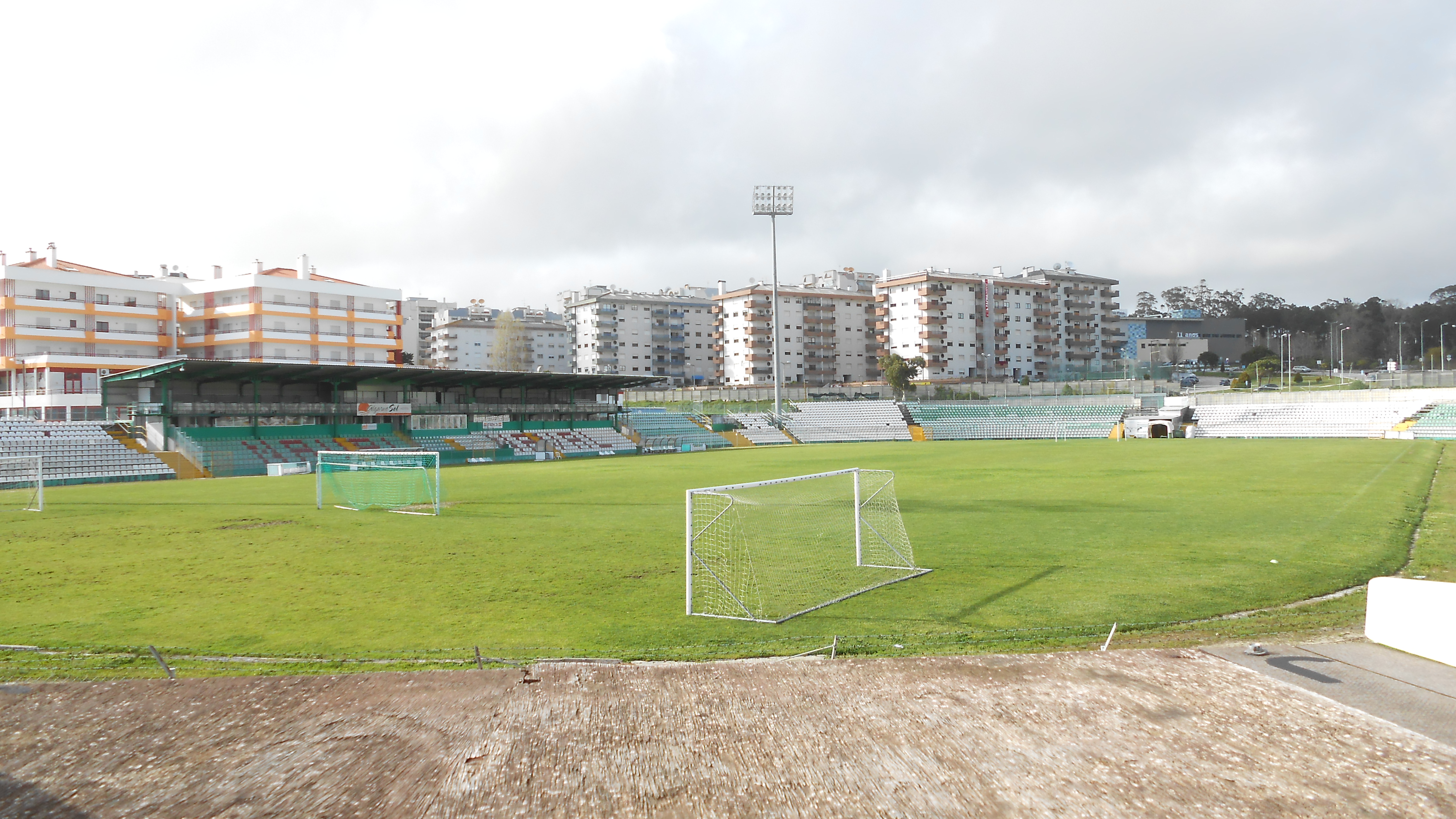
- Interactive map of Estádio Municipal José Bento Pessoa
- Full name: Estádio José Bento Pessoa
- Location: Figueira da Foz, Portugal
- Owner: City of Figueira da Foz
- Capacity: 9,000
- Surface: Grass
- Field size: 105 x 68 m

Construction
- Built: 1953
- Opened: 1953

Tenant
- Naval 1º de Maio

Estadio Municipal Jose Bento Pessoa is a multi-use stadium in Figueira da Foz, Portugal. It is currently used mostly for football matches and is home of the Naval 1º de Maio. The stadium is able to hold 9,000 people. The stadium was named for Portuguese cyclist José Bento Pessoa.
