= Lourdes Oyarbide =

Spanish cyclist

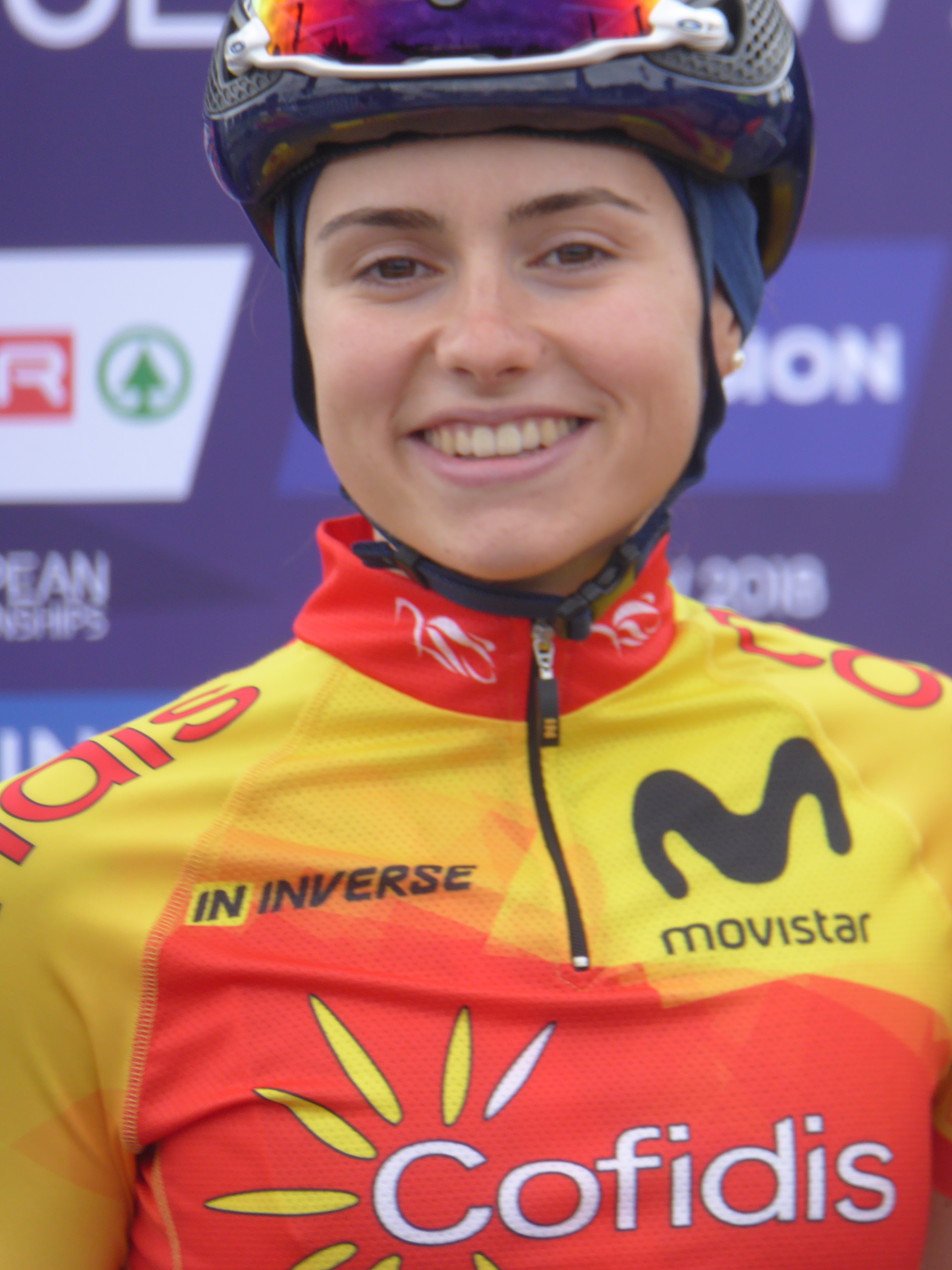
- Oyarbide at the 2018 European Road Cycling Championships.

Personal information
- Full name: Lourdes Oyarbide Jiménez
- Born: 8 April 1994 (age 32): Eguino, Basque Country, Spain

Cycling career
- Sport: Cycling
- Current team: Laboral Kutxa–Fundación Euskadi
- Discipline: Road
- Role: Rider
- Rider type: Rouleur

Amateur team
- 2012: Beste Alde–La Tostadora

Professional teams
- 2013–2017: Bizkaia–Durango
- 2018–2023: Movistar Team
- 2024–: Laboral Kutxa–Fundación Euskadi

Lourdes Oyarbide Jiménez (born 8 April 1994) is a Spanish racing cyclist, who currently rides for UCI Women's Continental Team Laboral Kutxa–Fundación Euskadi. She represented Spain at the 2014 UCI Road World Championships in the women's time trial.

== Major results ==
2012
10th Time trial, UCI Junior Road World Championships
2017
1st Time trial, National Road Championships
2018
5th Time trial, National Road Championships
2019
National Road Championships

1st Road race
2nd Time trial

1st Stage 4 Vuelta a Burgos Feminas
3rd Overall Thüringen Ladies Tour
6th Donostia San Sebastian Klasikoa
2020
4th Time trial, National Road Championships
2021
3rd Time trial, National Road Championships
4th Overall Belgium Tour
