= Maria del Mar Bonnin Palou =

Spanish cyclist

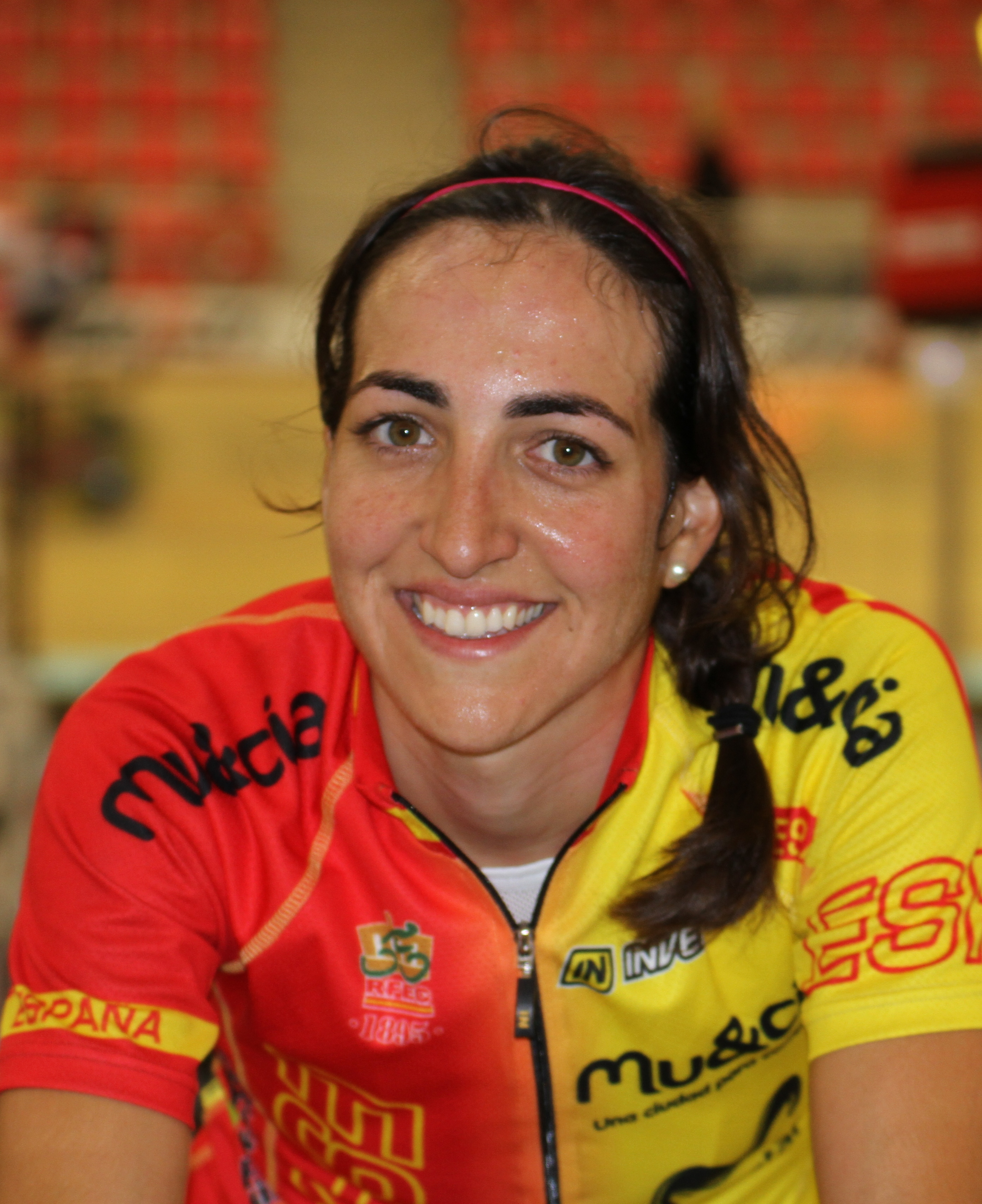
- María del Mar Bonnin Palou in 2015

Personal information
- Born: 12 May 1990 (age 36) Palma de Mallorca (Islas Baleares), Spain

Cycling career
- Sport: Cycling
- Disciplines: Road & Track racing cyclist
- Role: Rider

Professional teams
- 2012: Lointek
- 2015: BZK Emakumeen Bira
- 2016: Lointek

Maria del Mar Bonnin Palou (born 12 May 1990 in Palma de Mallorca, Spain) is a Spanish professional road and track racing cyclist who rides for Lointek. Her last result is the 75th place for the general classification during the Festival Elsy Jacobs in 2016.

== Teams ==
- 2012 - Lointek
- 2015 - BZK - Emakumeem Bira
- 2016 - Lointek

== See also ==
- List of 2016 UCI Women's Teams and riders
