= Ziortza Isasi =

Spanish cyclist

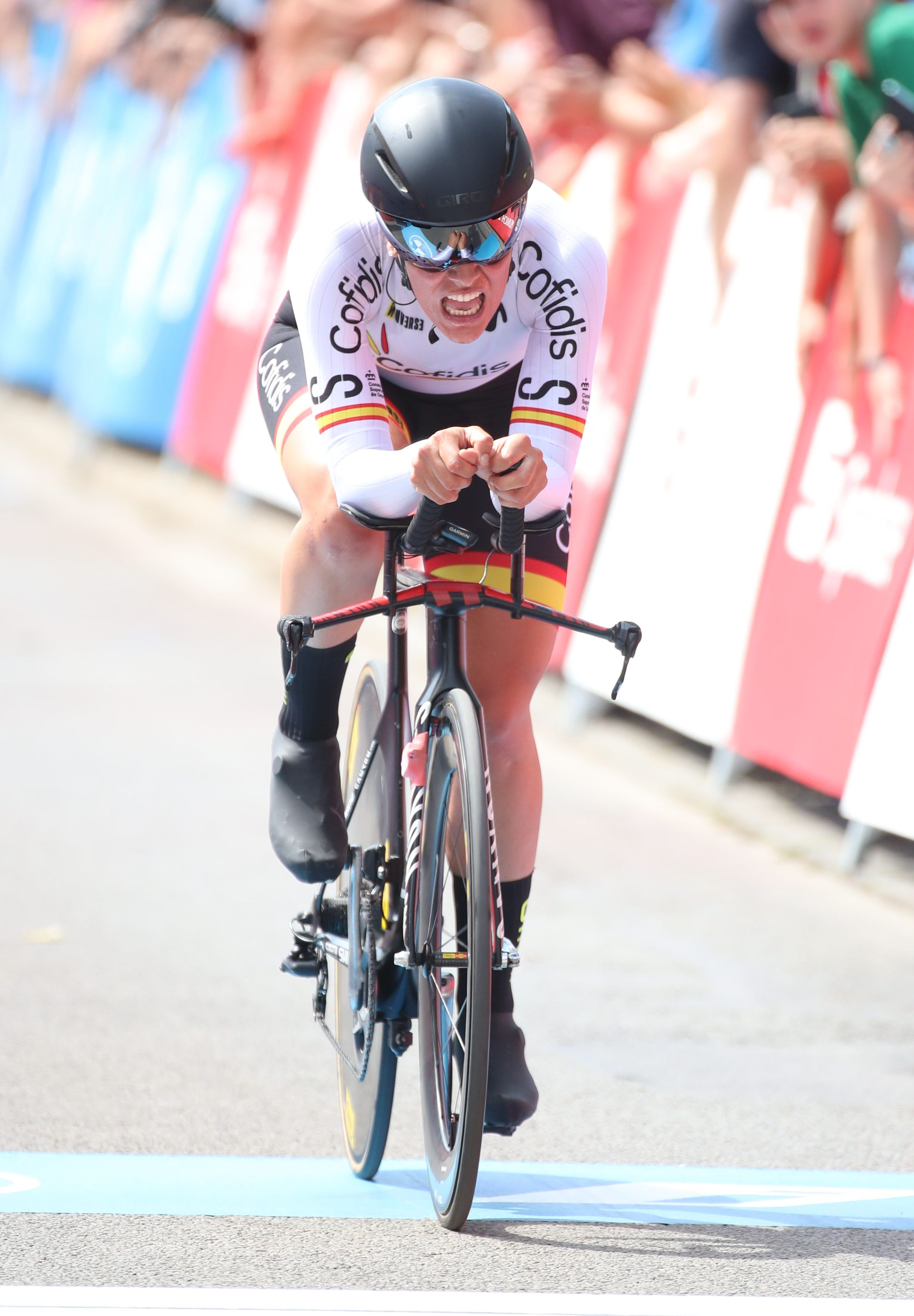
- Ziortza Isasi in 2022

Personal information
- Full name: Ziortza Isasi Cristobal
- Born: 5 August 1995 (age 31) Elorrio, Spain

Cycling career
- Sport: Cycling
- Current team: Eneicat–CMTeam
- Discipline: Road
- Role: Rider

Professional teams
- 2015: BZK Emakumeen Bira
- 2017–2018: Lointek
- 2019–: Eneicat

Ziortza Isasi Cristobal (born 5 August 1995) is a Spanish professional racing cyclist, who currently rides for UCI Women's Continental Team Eneicat–CMTeam.
