= Higinio Fernández =

Spanish cyclist

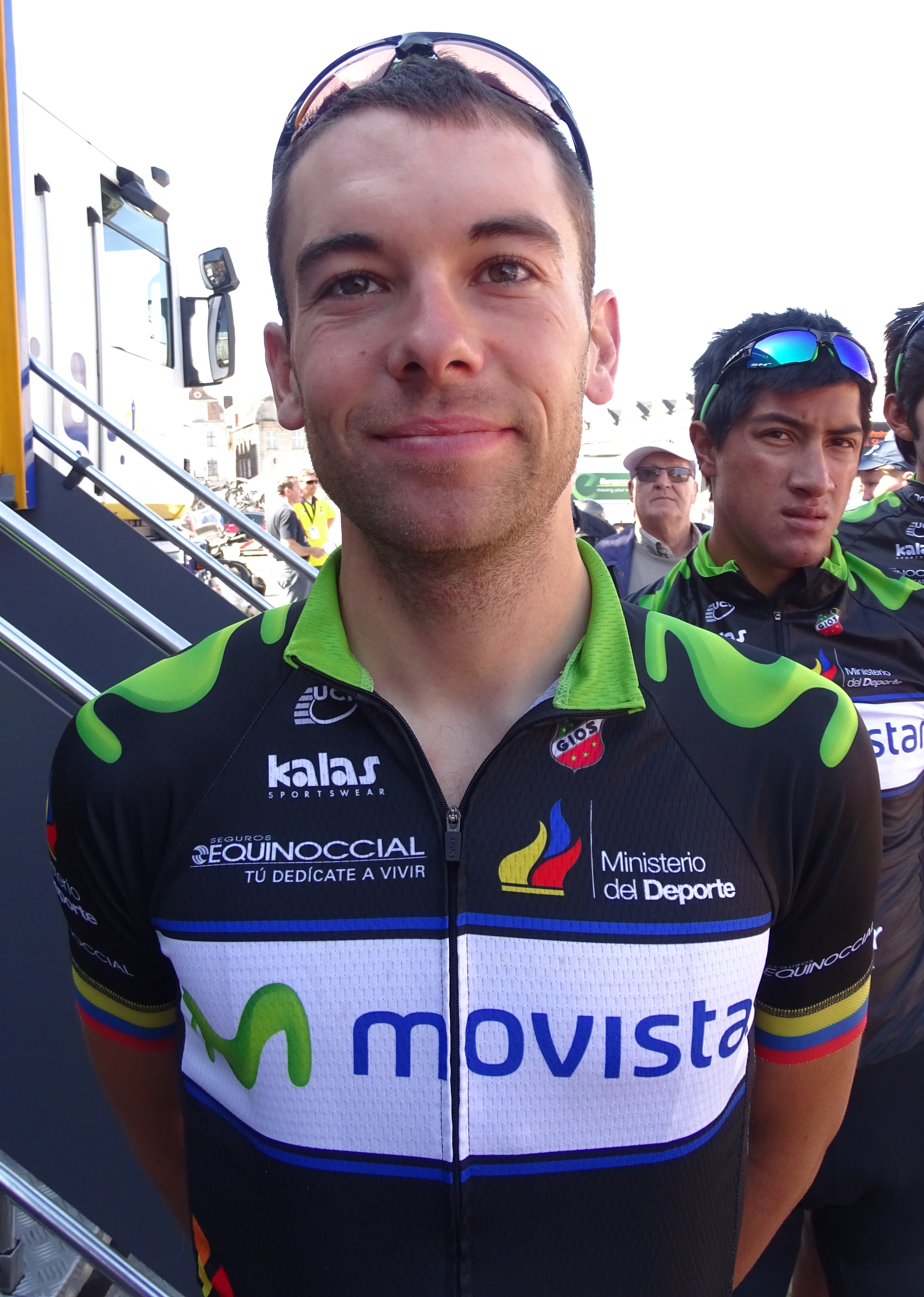
- Fernández in 2015.

Personal information
- Full name: Higinio Fernández Suárez
- Born: 6 October 1988 (age 38) Valdés, Asturias, Spain

Cycling career
- Sport: Cycling
- Current team: Retired
- Discipline: Road
- Role: Rider

Amateur teams
- 2006: Ciudad De Ovido
- 2007: Würth
- 2008–2009: Cueva El Soplao
- 2012–2013: Lizarte

Professional teams
- 2010–2011: Caja Rural
- 2014–2015: Team Ecuador

Higinio Fernández Suárez (born 6 October 1988) is a Spanish former professional racing cyclist. He rode at the 2014 UCI Road World Championships.

== Major results ==
2007
3rd Road race, National Under-23 Road Championships
2009
3rd Road race, National Under-23 Road Championships
2010
3rd Overall Circuito Montañés
10th Overall Vuelta Ciclista a León
2014
10th Overall Troféu Joaquim Agostinho
