= Itsaso Leunda =

Spanish cyclist

Personal information
- Full name: Itsaso Leunda Goñi
- Born: 3 March 1984 (age 42) Hernialde, Spain

Cycling career
- Sport: Cycling
- Current team: Debabarrena - Kirolgi
- Discipline: Road
- Role: Rider

Professional team
- 2008–: Debabarrena - Kirolgi

Itsaso Leunda Goñi (born 3 March 1984) is a Spanish racing cyclist. She is the 2008 Spanish National Road Race Champion.
