= Anna Ramírez (cyclist) =

Spanish cyclist

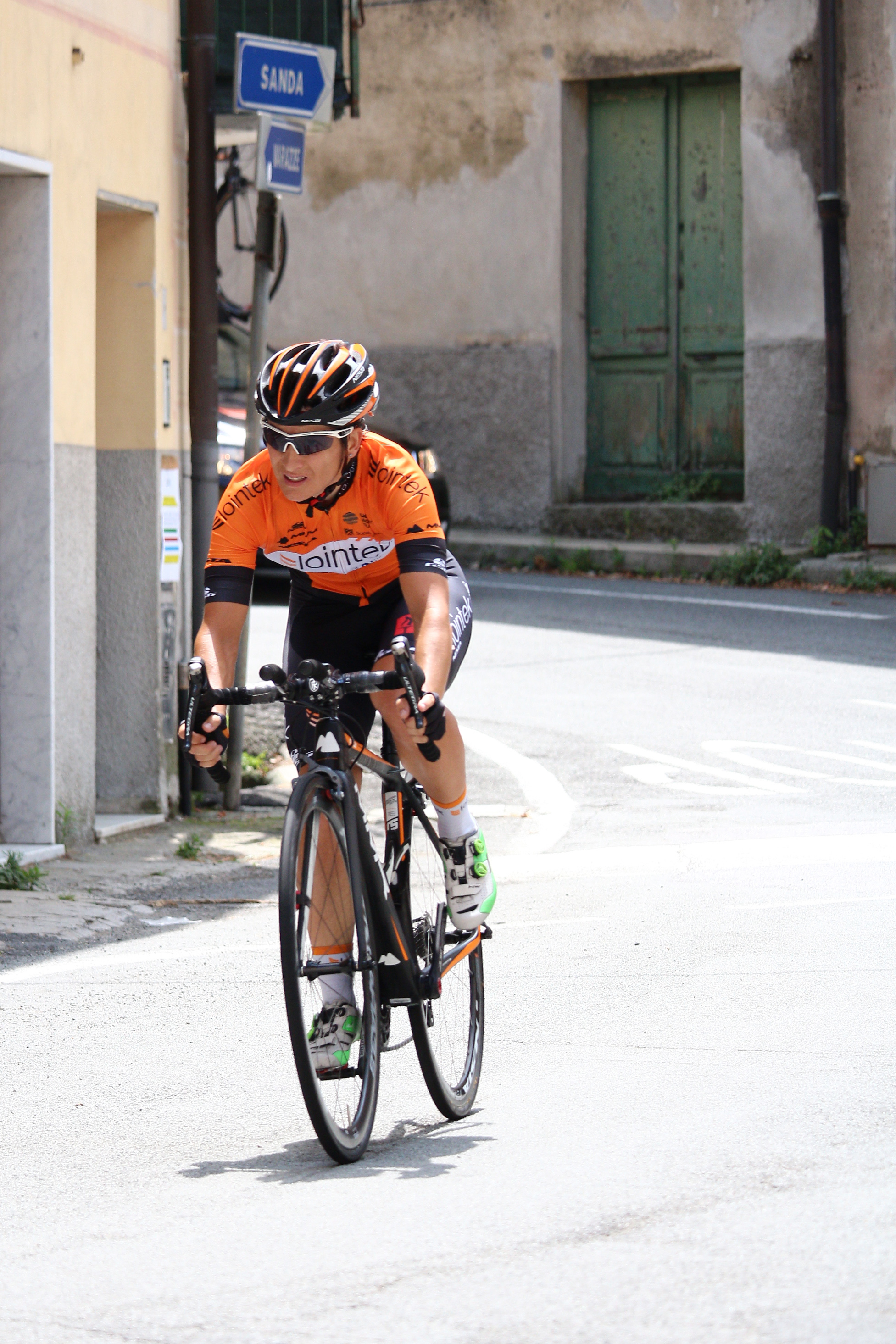
- Ramírez during the 2016 Giro d'Italia Femminile

Personal information
- Full name: Anna Ramírez Bauxell
- Born: 14 March 1981 (age 45) Vic, Spain

Cycling career
- Sport: Cycling
- Disciplines: Road; Mountain biking
- Role: Rider

Amateur teams
- 2008: MultiCaja–CC Sabiñánigo
- 2011: Ono
- 2011: Ouribike / CC Ouriquense (guest)
- 2012: Ouribike / CC Ouriquense

Professional teams
- 2014–2015: Bizkaia–Durango
- 2016–2017: Lointek

Anna Ramírez Bauxell (born 14 March 1981) is a Spanish racing cyclist, who rode professionally in road racing between 2014 and 2017. She won the Spanish National Road Race Championships in 2004 and 2014, and finished second on four other occasions.

== Personal life ==
Ramírez and her sisters were raised vegetarian. For health reasons, she follows a vegan diet in her home and most of the time outside of it.

== See also ==
- List of 2015 UCI Women's Teams and riders
