= Fátima Blázquez =

Spanish cyclist

Personal information
- Full name: María Fátima Blázquez Lozano
- Born: 14 May 1975 (age 51) Salamanca, Spain
- Height: 168 cm (5 ft 6 in)
- Weight: 52 kg (115 lb)

Cycling career
- Sport: Cycling
- Discipline: Road cycling

María Fátima Blázquez Lozano (born 14 May 1975) is a road cyclist from Spain. She represented her nation at the 1996 Summer Olympics in the women's road race and at the 2000 Summer Olympics in the women's road race.
