= Arantzazu Azpiroz =

Spanish cyclist

Personal information
- Born: 1 September 1981 (age 45) Spain

Cycling career
- Sport: Cycling
- Discipline: Road cycling

Professional team
- 2008: Bizkaia–Durango

Arantzazu Azpiroz (born 1 September 1981) is a road cyclist from Spain. She represented her nation at the 2002 and 2007 UCI Road World Championships.
