= Leticia Gil =

Spanish cyclist (born 1982)

Leticia Gil Parra
Personal information
- Born: 1 August 1982 (age 44) Madrid, Spain

Cycling career
- Sport: Cycling
- Discipline: Road cycling

Professional team
- 2010–2011: Lointek

Leticia Gil Parra (born 1 August 1982) is a road cyclist from Spain. She represented her nation at the 2008 UCI Road World Championships.
