= Glas–Smurfit Kappa =

Team information
- Registered: Spain
- Founded: 2015
- Discipline: Road
- Status: UCI Women's Team (2015); National (2016– )

Key personnel
- General manager: Eneritz Iturriagaechevarria

Team name history
- 2015 2015 2016–2017 2018–: BZK Pro Basic; BZK Emakumeen Bira; BZK Emakumeen Bira–Smurfit Kappa; Glas–Smurfit Kappa

Glas–Smurfit Kappa is a professional cycling team, based in Spain, which competes in elite road bicycle racing events such as the UCI Women's Road World Cup in 2015. BZK Emakumeen Bira was the third UCI Women's team competing in 2015 from Spain, for the 2016 season onwards the team stepped down to National level.

== Major results ==
2015
Overall Gipuzkoako Emakumeen Itzulia, Gloria Rodriguez

Prologue, Gloria Rodriguez

2018
Stage 2 Vuelta a Burgos, Isabel Martin

== National champions ==
2015
Spain Track (Scratch race), María Bonnin
Spain Track (Team pursuit), Ziortza Isasi

== Team history ==
On September 30, 2014, Olatz Agorria, Aiala Amesti, Maria del Mar Bonnin, Ziortza Isasi, Gloria Rodriguez, Maria San Jose and Eider Unanue. On November 20 the team signed Naia Alzola.
