= Belén Cuevas =

Spanish cyclist (born 1967)

Personal information
- Full name: Belén Cuevas López
- Born: 14 August 1967 (age 59) Reinosa, Spain

Cycling career
- Sport: Cycling
- Discipline: Road cycling
- Role: Rider

Belén Cuevas López (born 14 August 1967) is a road cyclist from Spain. She represented her nation at the 1992 Summer Olympics in the women's road race.
