= Rosa María Bravo =

Spanish cyclist

Personal information
- Full name: Rosa María Bravo Soba
- Born: 25 August 1976 (age 50) Spain

Cycling career
- Sport: Cycling
- Discipline: Road cycling

Rosa María Bravo Soba (born 25 August 1976) is a road cyclist from Spain. She represented her nation at the 2000, 2001, 2002 and 2010 UCI Road World Championships.
