= Izaskun Bengoa =

Spanish cyclist

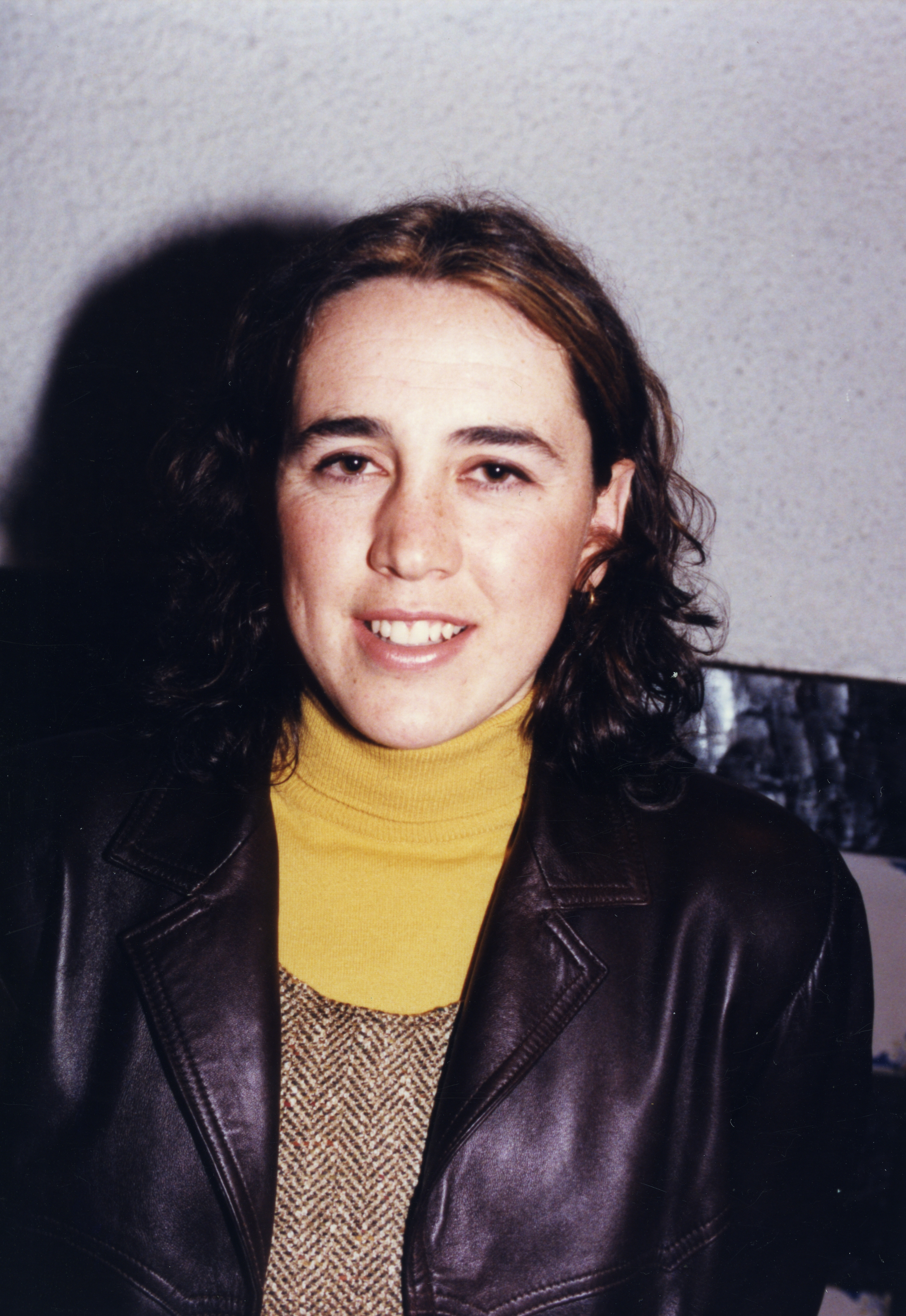
- road cyclist

Personal information
- Full name: Izaskun Bengoa Pérez
- Born: 14 March 1975 (age 51) Bilbao, Spain
- Height: 172 cm (5 ft 8 in)
- Weight: 63 kg (139 lb)

Cycling career
- Sport: Cycling
- Disciplines: Road cycling, Track cycling
- Role: Rider

Izaskun Bengoa Pérez (born 14 March 1975) is a road cyclist from Spain. She represented her nation at the 1996 Summer Olympics on the road in the women's road race and on the track in the women's points race.
