= Volta a Catalunya =

Spanish multi-day road cycling race

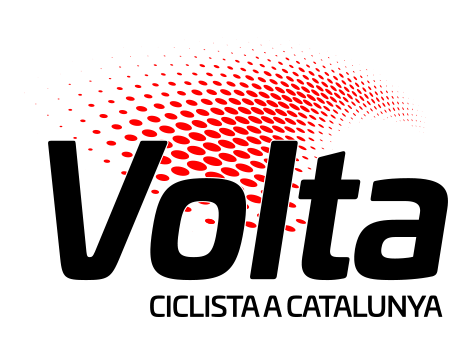

Race details
- Date: Late March
- Region: Catalonia, Spain
- English name: Tour of Catalonia
- Local name(s): Volta a Catalunya (in Catalan); Vuelta a Cataluña (in Spanish)
- Discipline: Road
- Competition: UCI World Tour
- Type: Major one week stage race
- Organiser: "Volta" Ciclista a Catalunya Associació Esportiva (Unió Esportiva de Sants)
- Race director: Rubèn Peris
- Web site: www.voltacatalunya.cat

History
- First edition: 1911
- Editions: 105 (as of 2026)
- First winner: Sebastià Masdeu (ESP)
- Most wins: Mariano Cañardo (ESP) (7 wins)
- Most recent: Jonas Vingegaard (DEN)

The Volta a Catalunya (Catalan pronunciation: [ˈvɔltə ə kətəˈluɲə]; Tour of Catalonia, Spanish: Vuelta a Cataluña) is a road bicycle race held annually in Catalonia, Spain.

It is one of three World Tour stage races in Spain, together with the Vuelta a España and the Tour of the Basque Country. The race has had several different calendar dates, having been previously run in September, June and May. Since 2010 it has been on the calendar in late March as part of the UCI World Tour.

Raced over seven days, it covers the autonomous community of Catalonia in Northeast Spain and contains one or more stages in the mountain region of the Pyrenees. The race traditionally finishes with a stage in Barcelona, Catalonia's capital, on a circuit with the famous Montjuïc climb and park.

First held in 1911, the Volta a Catalunya is the fourth-oldest still-existing cycling stage race in the world. Only the Tour de France (1903), the Tour of Belgium (1908) and the Giro d'Italia (1909) are older. It was the second cycling event organized on the Iberian Peninsula, after the amateur and sub-23 race Volta a Tarragona (1908), also held in Catalonia but no longer on the calendar. Catalan cycling icon Mariano Cañardo won the race seven times in the 1920s and 1930s, setting an unsurpassed record.

In 2018, the one-day women's competition reVolta was organised on the same day of the last men's stage. In 2024, the reVolta was replaced by a women's stage race, which is currently a category 2.1 UCI event.

== History ==
=== The pioneering days ===
The traditional white jersey with the three green stripes of the leader of the Volta, tea the origen in the equipment of the Unió Esportiva Sants.

The Volta a Catalunya was created in 1911 by cycling journalist Miquel Arteman, editor of Barcelona-based sports newspaper El Mundo Deportivo. Arteman partnered with Narcisse Masferrer, president of Spanish Cycling Union, and Jaume Grau, founder and owner of El Mundo Deportivo.

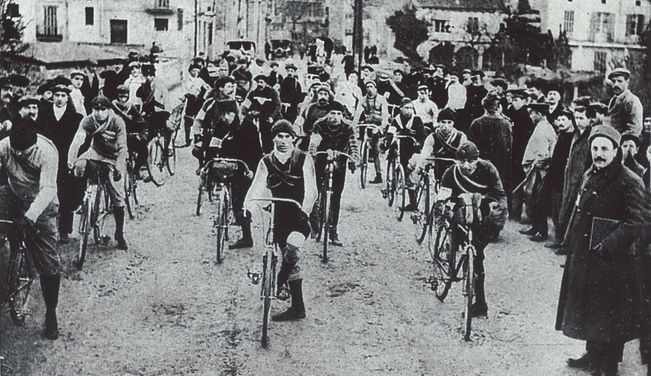
Start of the first Volta a Catalunya in Barcelona, on 6 January 1911.

The first edition was held from 6 to 8 January 1911. 43 riders signed up but only 34 started on Barcelona's Plaça de Sarrià. The first stage was run from Barcelona to Tarragona at 97 km, the second from Tarragona to Lleida at 111 km and the final 157 km stage from Lleida back to Barcelona, totaling 363 km. 22 riders finished the race on the Velodrome di Sants. Catalan rider Seabastià Masdeu won the first and third stages and became the first overall winner. The winner's average speed was 23 km/h.

The Club Deportivo Barcelona, presided by Miquel Arteman, took on the race organization in 1912 and 1913. The event was still organized on a three-stage format and amassed large numbers of spectators along the largely unpaved roads. Local Catalan riders Josép Magdalena and Juan Martí won the second and third editions, respectively. After 1913, the Volta a Catalunya was suspended because of World War I; it was reprised in 1920, but was discontinued again over the next two years because of the chaotic return of the race.

=== Revival and Spanish Civil War ===
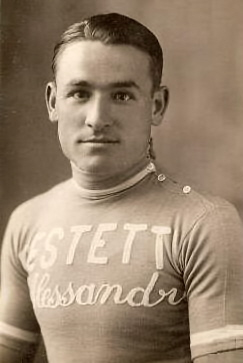
Mariano Cañardo won the race a record seven times in the 1920s and 1930s.

The race was revived in 1923 for its fifth edition. The organization was taken over by the Unión Deportiva de Sants, which also supported Barcelona football teams. The race grew to a one-week event and gained prestige fast. It became a fixture on the calendar, attracting more foreign participants, mainly from France and Italy. The 1920s and 1930s became the era of Catalan cycling icon Mariano Cañardo, who became the leading figure of the Volta a Catalunya with seven victories.

During the Spanish Civil War, the race had its last interruptions in 1937 and 1938, hampering Cañardo's winning streak. After the civil war, World War II broke out in the rest of Europe and, while Catalonia was war-ridden and despite lacking foreign participants, the race was at the peak of its popularity and considered a symbol of Catalan sports culture. In 1945, marking the event's 25th edition, the Volta a Catalunya was exceptionally run over two weeks, before returning to its seven-day format the next year.

=== Modern era ===
Over the years, some of cycling's greatest riders have won the race. Miguel Poblet won the Volta twice in the 1950s, Jacques Anquetil in 1967, Eddy Merckx in 1968, Luis Ocaña in 1971, Felice Gimondi in 1972, Francesco Moser in 1978, and Sean Kelly in 1984 and 1986. Miguel Induráin, Spanish cycling icon of the modern era, won the race three times in the early 1990s. Colombian Álvaro Mejía became the first non-European winner in 1993.

From 1941 until 1994, the race was held in September. When UCI revolutionized the international cycling calendar in 1995, the Vuelta a España was awarded the September date and the Volta a Catalunya moved to June on the calendar. The race finished two weeks before the start of the Tour de France and the Volta became the principal preparation race for general classification protagonists. Frenchman Laurent Jalabert won the 1995 edition, preceding his fourth place in that year's Tour de France.

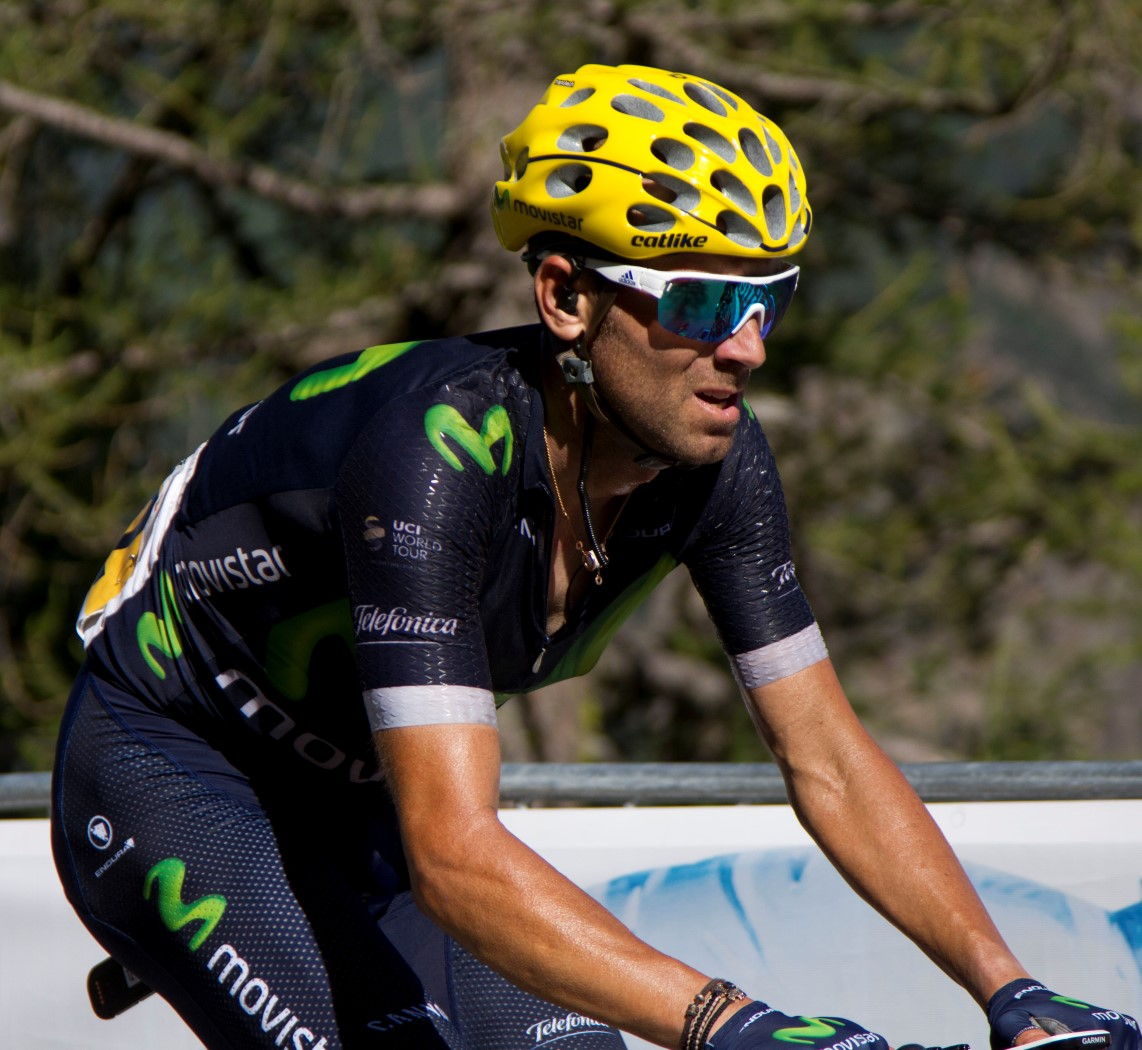
Spanish allround specialist Alejandro Valverde was the first rider since Miguel Induráin to win the Volta a Catalunya three times.

In 1999, 22-year old Spanish rider Manuel Sanroma died as a result of a crash during the second stage of the race. Sanroma, a promising sprinter, was the favourite to win the stage, but fell head-first onto a sidewalk at one kilometre from the finish in Vilanova i la Geltrú. Despite wearing a helmet, he succumbed to his injuries in hospital. The next day, riders decided to neutralize the stage to Barcelona.

=== World Tour Race ===
In 2005, the Volta a Catalunya was included in the inaugural UCI Pro Tour and the date was shifted to May to avoid the Tour de Suisse date. The edition was won by Ukrainian Yaroslav Popovych but the move did not prove successful because the new date coincided with the Giro d'Italia.

In 2010 the race moved to late March on the calendar, the slot formerly held by another Catalan stage race, the Setmana Catalana. Joaquim Rodríguez, the foremost Catalan rider of his generation, won the race twice after the date shift. Alberto Contador, winner of the 2011 edition, was later stripped of his win after his positive doping test in the 2010 Tour de France. Italian runner-up Michele Scarponi was retroactively awarded the victory. The 2020 edition was cancelled due to the COVID-19 pandemic.

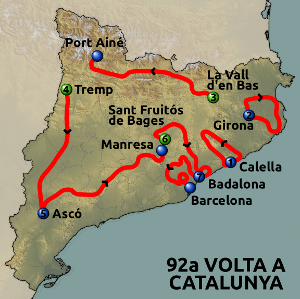
Route of the 2012 Volta a Catalunya.

== Route ==
Since the race's earlier date on the calendar in late March, the Volta a Catalunya has started in one of the coastal resorts on the Costa Brava with a stage through rolling terrain inland, usually suited for sprinters.

The race reaches the Pyrenees mountains in the middle part of the race, although the mountains are usually less high than before the date shift, due to frequent snowy and cold conditions at high altitude in March. One of the regular climbs in the race is the summit finish to La Molina, an 11.6 km climb with a 4.8% average gradient. The ski resort in Alp takes the peloton deep into the Pyrenees to 1694 m altitude, with the weather often a decisive factor.

The race traditionally finishes with a hilly stage in Barcelona on a circuit, featuring eight trips over the Montjuïc climb and park.

== Winners ==
Year	Country	Rider	Team
1911	Spain	Sebastià Masdeu	
1912	Spain	Josép Magdalena	
1913	Spain	Juan Martí	
1914– 1919	No race due to World War I		
1920	France	José Pelletier	
1921	No race		
1922	No race		
1923	France	Maurice Ville	Automoto-Hutchinson
1924	Spain	Miquel Mucio	U.D. Sans
1925	Spain	Miquel Mucio	U.D. Sans
1926	France	Víctor Fontan	individual
1927	France	Víctor Fontan	individual
1928	Spain	Mariano Cañardo	Elvish-Wolber
1929	Spain	Mariano Cañardo	F.C. Barcelona
1930	Spain	Mariano Cañardo	Styl
1931	Spain	Salvador Cardona	individual
1932	Spain	Mariano Cañardo	individual
1933	Italy	Alfredo Bovet	Bianchi
1934	Italy	Bernardo Rogora	Gloria
1935	Spain	Mariano Cañardo	Orbea
1936	Spain	Mariano Cañardo	Colin–Wolber
1937	No race due to Civil War		
1938	No race due to Civil War		
1939	Spain	Mariano Cañardo	individual
1940	Luxembourg	Christophe Didier	Alcyon–Dunlop
1941	Spain	Antonio Andrés Sancho	individual
1942	Spain	Fédérico Ezquerra	individual
1943	Spain	Julián Berrendero	F.C. Barcelona
1944	Spain	Miguel Casas	individual
1945	Spain	Bernardo Ruiz	individual
1946	Spain	Julián Berrendero	Chiclès-Tabay
1947	Spain	Emilio Rodríguez	U.D. Sans–Alas Color–Minaco
1948	Spain	Emilio Rodríguez	U.D. Sans-Alas Color
1949	France	Émile Rol	La Perle–Hutchinson
1950	Spain	Antonio Gelabert	individual
1951	Italy	Primo Volpi	Arbos-Talbot
1952	Spain	Miguel Poblet	Canals & Nubiola
1953	Spain	Salvador Botella	individual
1954	Italy	Walter Serena	Bottecchia-Ursus
1955	Spain	José Gómez del Moral	Minaco
1956	Spain	Aniceto Utset	Mobylette–Coabania
1957	Spain	Jesús Loroño	
1958	Belgium	Richard Van Genechten	
1959	Spain	Salvador Botella	
1960	Spain	Miguel Poblet	
1961	France	Henri Duez	
1962	Spain	Antonio Karmany	
1963	France	Joseph Novales	
1964	France	Joseph Carrara	
1965	Spain	Antonio Gómez del Moral	
1966	Netherlands	Arie den Hartog	
1967	France	Jacques Anquetil	
1968	Belgium	Eddy Merckx	
1969	Spain	Mariano Díaz	
1970	Italy	Franco Bitossi	
1971	Spain	Luis Ocaña	
1972	Italy	Felice Gimondi	
1973	Spain	Domingo Perurena	
1974	France	Bernard Thévenet	
1975	Italy	Fausto Bertoglio	
1976	Spain	Enrique Martínez	
1977	Belgium	Freddy Maertens	
1978	Italy	Francesco Moser	
1979	Spain	Vicente Belda	
1980	Spain	Marino Lejarreta	Teka
1981	Spain	Faustino Rupérez	Zor
1982	Spain	Alberto Fernández	Teka
1983	Spain	Josep Recio	Kelme
1984	Ireland	Sean Kelly	Skil–Sem
1985	Great Britain	Robert Millar	Peugeot
1986	Ireland	Sean Kelly	KAS
1987	Spain	Álvaro Pino	BH
1988	Spain	Miguel Induráin	Reynolds
1989	Spain	Marino Lejarreta	Caja Rural
1990	Spain	Laudelino Cubino	BH
1991	Spain	Miguel Induráin	Banesto
1992	Spain	Miguel Induráin	Banesto
1993	Colombia	Álvaro Mejía	Motorola
1994	Italy	Claudio Chiappucci	Carrera Jeans–Tassoni
1995	France	Laurent Jalabert	ONCE
1996	Switzerland	Alex Zülle	ONCE
1997	Spain	Fernando Escartín	Kelme–Costa Blanca
1998	Colombia	Hernán Buenahora	Vitalicio Seguros
1999	Spain	Manuel Beltrán	Banesto
2000	Spain	José María Jiménez	Banesto
2001	Spain	Joseba Beloki	ONCE–Eroski
2002	Spain	Roberto Heras	U.S. Postal Service
2003	Spain	José Antonio Pecharromán	Costa de Almería-Paternina
2004	Spain	Miguel Ángel Martín Perdiguero	Phonak
2005	Ukraine	Yaroslav Popovych	Discovery Channel
2006	Spain	David Cañada	Saunier Duval–Prodir
2007	Russia	Vladimir Karpets	Caisse d'Epargne
2008	Spain	Gustavo César	Karpin–Galicia
2009	Spain	Alejandro Valverde	Caisse d'Epargne
2010	Spain	Joaquim Rodríguez	Team Katusha
2011	Italy	Michele Scarponi (Note: Alberto Contador (Saxo Bank–SunGard) won the 2011 edition but was later disqualified.)	Lampre–ISD
2012	Switzerland	Michael Albasini	GreenEDGE
2013	Ireland	Dan Martin	Garmin–Sharp
2014	Spain	Joaquim Rodríguez	Team Katusha
2015	Australia	Richie Porte	Team Sky
2016	Colombia	Nairo Quintana	Movistar Team
2017	Spain	Alejandro Valverde	Movistar Team
2018	Spain	Alejandro Valverde	Movistar Team
2019	Colombia	Miguel Ángel López	Astana
2020	No race due to COVID-19 pandemic		
2021	Great Britain	Adam Yates	INEOS Grenadiers
2022	Colombia	Sergio Higuita	Bora–Hansgrohe
2023	Slovenia	Primož Roglič	Team Jumbo–Visma
2024	Slovenia	Tadej Pogačar	UAE Team Emirates
2025	Slovenia	Primož Roglič	Red Bull–Bora–Hansgrohe
2026	Denmark	Jonas Vingegaard	Visma–Lease a Bike

=== Multiple winners ===
Wins	Rider	Editions
7	Mariano Cañardo (ESP)	1928, 1929, 1930, 1932, 1935, 1936, 1939
3	Miguel Induráin (ESP)	1988, 1991, 1992
3	Alejandro Valverde (ESP)	2009, 2017, 2018
2	Miguel Mucio (ESP)	1924, 1925
2	Victor Fontan (FRA)	1926, 1927
2	Emilio Rodríguez (ESP)	1947, 1948
2	Miguel Poblet (ESP)	1952, 1960
2	Salvador Botella (ESP)	1953, 1959
2	Marino Lejarreta (ESP)	1980, 1989
2	Sean Kelly (IRL)	1984, 1986
2	Joaquim Rodríguez (ESP)	2010, 2014
2	Primož Roglič (SLO)	2023, 2025

=== Wins per country ===
Wins	Country
60	Spain
11	France
10	Italy
5	Colombia
3	Belgium; Ireland; Slovenia
2	Great Britain; Switzerland
1	Australia; Denmark; Luxembourg; Netherlands; Russia; Ukraine

=== Most stage wins ===
#	Rider	Stage wins
1	Miguel Poblet (ESP)	33
2	Mariano Cañardo (ESP)	22
3	Domingo Perurena (ESP)	14
4	Emilio Rodríguez (ESP)	12
5	Mario Cipollini (ITA)	11
6	Miguel Gual (ESP)	10
7	Alejandro Valverde (ESP)	9
8	Laurent Jalabert (FRA)	8
8	Seán Kelly (IRL)	8
8	Johan van der Velde (NED)	8
8	Julián Berrendero (ESP)	8

=== Medals (1911–2023) ===
Only general classification results; excludes stages results.

Rank	Nation	Gold	Silver	Bronze	Total
1	Spain	60	64	62	186
2	France	11	6	11	28
3	Italy	10	9	10	29
4	Colombia	5	3	2	10
5	Belgium	3	6	3	12
6	Ireland	3	3	1	7
7	Switzerland	2	3	5	10
8	Great Britain	2	1	1	4
9	Slovenia	2	0	0	2
10	Australia	1	3	0	4
11	Netherlands	1	1	1	3
11	Russia	1	1	1	3
13	Luxembourg	1	1	0	2
14	Ukraine	1	0	0	1
15	Austria	0	1	0	1
15	Ecuador	0	1	0	1
17	Portugal	0	0	3	3
18	United States	0	0	2	2
19	Estonia	0	0	1	1
Totals (19 entries)		103	103	103	309

== Jerseys ==
The leader of the overall general classification receives a white-and-green striped jersey. There are also three other classifications. The winner of the points classification (sprints) wears a white-and-orange striped jersey, a white-and-red striped jersey for the winner of the mountain classification and the jersey of the Catalonia regional cycling team is for the best classified Catalan. There is also a team classification.

== See also ==
- Setmana Catalana de Ciclisme – men's race held in Catalunya between 1963 and 2005
- Tour of the Basque Country
- Vuelta a España
- UCI ProTour
