= 1920 Volta a Catalunya =

Race details
- Dates: 24–26 September 1920
- Stages: 3
- Distance: 630 km (391.5 mi)
- Winning time: 23h 55' 16"

Results
	Winner	José Pelletier (FRA)
	Second	José Nat (FRA)
	Third	Jaume Janer (ESP)

The 1920 Volta a Catalunya was the fourth edition of the Volta a Catalunya cycle race and was held from 24 September to 26 September 1920. The race started and finished in Barcelona. The race was won by José Pelletier.

== Route and stages ==
List of stages
Stage	Date	Course	Distance	Winner
1 (A)	24 September	Barcelona to Olot	157 km (98 mi)	José Pelletier (FRA)
1 (A)	24 September	Olot to Tona	83 km (52 mi)	José Pelletier (FRA)
2	25 September	Tona to Lleida	181 km (112 mi)	José Pelletier (FRA)
3 (A)	26 September	Lleida to Tarragona	91 km (57 mi)	José Pelletier (FRA)
3 (B)	26 September	Tarragona to Barcelona	95 km (59 mi)	José Nat (FRA)
	Total		607 km (377 mi)	

== General classification ==
Final general classification

Rank	Rider	Time
1	José Pelletier (FRA)	23h 55' 16"
2	José Nat (FRA)	+ 20' 12"
3	Jaime Janer (ESP)	+ 1h 09' 14"
4	Marcelo Llopis (ESP)	+ 1h 45' 11"
5	Guillermo Antón (ESP)	+ 2h 30' 51"
6	Bienvenido Torres (ESP)	+ 3h 12' 12"
7	Jaime Martí (ESP)	+ 3h 13' 06"
8	Luis Torres (ESP)	+ 5h 01' 05"
9	Conrado Escardó (ESP)	+ 5h 19' 08"
10	Manuel Alegre (ESP)	+ 5h 27' 25"
