= 1924 Tour of the Basque Country =

Race details
- Dates: 7–10 August 1924
- Stages: 3
- Distance: 623 km (387 mi)
- Winning time: 22h 46' 36"

Results
	Winner	Francis Pélissier (FRA)
	Second	Henri Pélissier (FRA)
	Third	Charles Lacquehay (FRA)

The 1924 Tour of the Basque Country was the inaugural edition of the Tour of the Basque Country cycle race and was held from 7 August to 10 August 1924. The race started and finished in Bilbao. The race was won by Francis Pélissier.

== General classification ==
Final general classification

Rank	Rider	Time
1	Francis Pélissier (FRA)	22h 46' 36"
2	Henri Pélissier (FRA)	+ 14' 54"
3	Charles Lacquehay (FRA)	+ 14' 54"
4	Victor Fontan (FRA)	+ 14' 54"
5	Simon Tequi (FRA)	+ 19' 11"
6	Jean Brunier (FRA)	+ 21' 43"
7	Teodoro Monteys (ESP)	+ 22' 02"
8	Henri Colle (SUI)	+ 24' 54"
9	Miguel Mucio (ESP)	+ 26' 41"
10	Jaime Janer (ESP)	+ 41' 15"
