= 1925 Volta a Catalunya =

Race details
- Dates: 21–24 May 1925
- Stages: 4
- Distance: 716 km (444.9 mi)
- Winning time: 28h 36' 12"

Results
	Winner	Miguel Mucio (ESP)
	Second	Jaime Janer (ESP)
	Third	Teodoro Monteys (ESP)

The 1925 Volta a Catalunya was the seventh edition of the Volta a Catalunya cycle race and was held from 21 May to 24 May 1925. The race started and finished in Barcelona. The race was won by Miguel Mucio.

== Route and stages ==
List of stages
Stage	Date	Course	Distance	Winner
1	21 May	Barcelona to Figueres	196 km (122 mi)	Miguel Mucio (ESP)
2 (A)	22 May	Figueres to Vic	120 km (75 mi)	Jaime Janer (ESP)
2 (B)	22 May	Vic to Igualada	88 km (55 mi)	Teodoro Monteys (ESP)
3	23 May	Igualada to Reus	196 km (122 mi)	Jaime Janer (ESP)
4	24 May	Reus to Barcelona	116 km (72 mi)	Jaime Janer (ESP)
	Total		716 km (445 mi)	

== General classification ==
Final general classification

Rank	Rider	Time
1	Miguel Mucio (ESP)	28h 36' 12"
2	Jaime Janer (ESP)	+ 5' 10"
3	Teodoro Monteys (ESP)	+ 10' 09"
4	José Busqué (ESP)	+ 13' 15"
5	Joan Juan Cañellas (ESP)	+ 17' 54"
6	Salvador Codorniu (ESP)	+ 24' 01"
7	José María Sans (ESP)	+ 24' 45"
8	Antonio Torres (ESP)	+ 35' 44"
9	Gabriel Cruz (ESP)	+ 39' 27"
10	Guillermo Antón (ESP)	+ 39' 27"
