= 1926 Volta a Catalunya =

Race details
- Dates: 22–29 August 1926
- Stages: 6
- Distance: 1,099 km (682.9 mi)
- Winning time: 44h 04' 40"

Results
	Winner	Victor Fontan (FRA)
	Second	Miguel Mucio (ESP)
	Third	Mariano Cañardo (ESP)

The 1926 Volta a Catalunya was the eighth edition of the Volta a Catalunya cycle race and was held from 22 August to 29 August 1926. The race started and finished in Barcelona. The race was won by Victor Fontan.

== Route and stages ==
List of stages
Stage	Date	Course	Distance	Winner
1	22 August	Barcelona to Amposta	185 km (115 mi)	Simon Tequi (FRA)
2	23 August	Amposta to Reus	181 km (112 mi)	Victor Fontan (FRA)
	24 August	Reus		Rest day
3	25 August	Reus to Igualada	200 km (124 mi)	Simon Tequi (FRA)
4	26 August	Igualada to Vic	102 km (63 mi)	Victor Fontan (FRA)
	27 August	Vic		Rest day
5	28 August	Vic to Sant Feliu de Guíxols	234 km (145 mi)	Victor Fontan (FRA)
6	29 August	Sant Feliu de Guíxols to Barcelona	197 km (122 mi)	Secondo Martinetto (ITA)
	Total		1,099 km (683 mi)	

== General classification ==
Final general classification

Rank	Rider	Time
1	Victor Fontan (FRA)	44h 04' 40"
2	Miguel Mucio (ESP)	+ 7' 46"
3	Mariano Cañardo (ESP)	+ 9' 49"
4	Secondo Martinetto (ITA)	+ 17' 29"
5	Joan Juan Cañellas (ESP)	+ 30' 54"
6	Teodoro Monteys (ESP)	+ 1h 02' 19"
7	Arturo Tallada (ESP)	+ 1h 38' 08"
8	José Pons (ESP)	+ 2h 02' 39"
9	Angelo Gremo (ITA)	+ 2h 22' 37"
10	Gabriel Cruz (ESP)	+ 2h 25' 37"
