= Sebastián Masdeu =

Spanish cyclist (1889–1964)

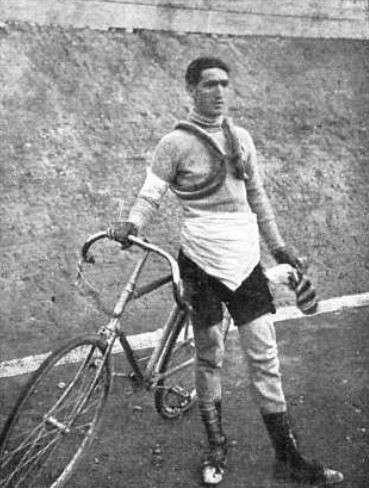

Personal information
- Full name: Sebastián Masdeu Menasanch
- Born: 1889 Tarragona, Spain
- Died: 5 January 1964 (aged 74-75) Barcelona, Spain

Cycling career
- Sport: Cycling
- Discipline: Road
- Role: Rider

Sebastián Masdeu Menasanch (1889 – 5 January 1964) was a Spanish cyclist, who won the first edition of the Volta a Catalunya in 1911.

== Major results ==
1908
6th Overall Volta a Tarragona
1911
1st Overall Volta a Catalunya

1st Stages 1 & 3

3rd Road race, National Road Championships
