= 1924 Volta a Catalunya =

Race details
- Dates: 29 May–1 June 1924
- Stages: 4
- Distance: 660 km (410.1 mi)
- Winning time: 25h 01' 30"

Results
	Winner	Miguel Mucio (ESP)
	Second	Teodoro Monteys (ESP)
	Third	Victorino Otero (ESP)

The 1924 Volta a Catalunya was the sixth edition of the Volta a Catalunya cycle race and was held from 29 May to 1 June 1924. The race started and finished in Barcelona. The race was won by Miguel Mucio.

== Route and stages ==
List of stages
Stage	Date	Course	Distance	Winner
1	29 May	Barcelona to Figueres	184 km (114 mi)	Miguel Mucio (ESP)
2	30 May	Figueres to Vic	178 km (111 mi)	Teodoro Monteys (ESP)
3	31 May	Vic to Reus	188 km (117 mi)	Miguel Mucio (ESP)
4	1 June	Reus to Barcelona	110 km (68 mi)	Jaime Janer (ESP)
	Total		660 km (410 mi)	

== General classification ==
Final general classification

Rank	Rider	Time
1	Miguel Mucio (ESP)	25h 01' 30"
2	Teodoro Monteys (ESP)	+ 10' 13"
3	Victorino Otero (ESP)	+ 15' 10"
4	Joan Juan Cañellas (ESP)	+ 34' 40"
5	Jaime Janer (ESP)	+ 38' 40"
6	Antonio Torrell (ESP)	+ 58' 49"
7	Pedro Sant (ESP)	+ 1h 06' 13"
8	Manuel Alegre (ESP)	+ 1h 08' 02"
9	José María Sans (ESP)	+ 1h 30' 36"
10	Miguel García (ESP)	+ 1h 32' 14"
