= 1923 Volta a Catalunya =

Race details
- Dates: 31 May–3 June 1923
- Stages: 4
- Distance: 642 km (398.9 mi)
- Winning time: 26h 30' 00"

Results
| | Winner | Maurice Ville (FRA) |
| | Second | José Pelletier (FRA) |
| | Third | José Nat (FRA) |

The 1923 Volta a Catalunya was the fifth edition of the Volta a Catalunya cycle race and was held from 31 May to 3 June 1923. The race started and finished in Barcelona. The race was won by Maurice Ville.

== Route and stages ==
List of stages
| Stage | Date | Course | Distance | Winner |
|---|---|---|---|---|
| 1 | 31 May | Barcelona to Reus | 168 km (104 mi) | Maurice Ville (FRA) |
| 2 | 1 June | Reus to Manresa | 160 km (99 mi) | Maurice Ville (FRA) |
| 3 | 2 June | Manresa to Figueres | 172 km (107 mi) | José Pelletier (FRA) |
| 4 | 3 June | Figueres to Barcelona | 142 km (88 mi) | Maurice Ville (FRA) |
| | Total | | 642 km (399 mi) | |

== General classification ==
Final general classification

| Rank | Rider | Time |
|---|---|---|
| 1 | Maurice Ville (FRA) | 26h 30' 00" |
| 2 | José Pelletier (FRA) | + 11' 10" |
| 3 | José Nat (FRA) | + 26' 47" |
| 4 | Victorino Otero (ESP) | + 30' 35" |
| 5 | Miguel Mucio (ESP) | + 37' 40" |
| 6 | Étienne Dorfeuille (FRA) | + 38' 12" |
| 7 | Miguel García (ESP) | + 1h 33' 12" |
| 8 | Francisco Tresseras (ESP) | + 1h 33' 30" |
| 9 | Juan Solanas (ESP) | + 1h 34' 02" |
| 10 | José María Sans (ESP) | + 1h 45' 40" |
