= 1924 Paris–Tours =

Race details
- Dates: 4 May 1924
- Stages: 1
- Distance: 342 km (212.5 mi)
- Winning time: 12h 01' 57"

Results
	Winner	Louis Mottiat (BEL)
	Second	Nicolas Frantz (LUX)
	Third	Jules Huyvaert (BEL)

The 1924 Paris–Tours was the 19th edition of the Paris–Tours cycle race and was held on 4 May 1924. The race started in Paris and finished in Tours. The race was won by Louis Mottiat.

== General classification ==
Final general classification

Rank	Rider	Time
1	Louis Mottiat (BEL)	12h 01' 57"
2	Nicolas Frantz (LUX)	+ 1' 38"
3	Jules Huyvaert (BEL)	+ 1' 38"
4	Bartolomeo Aimo (ITA)	+ 1' 38"
5	Maurice Ville (FRA)	+ 5' 30"
6	Albert Dejonghe (BEL)	+ 8' 03"
7	Francis Pélissier (FRA)	+ 10' 03"
8	Ottavio Bottecchia (ITA)	+ 15' 00"
9	Jean Brunier (FRA)	+ 15' 00"
10	Georges Cuvelier (FRA)	+ 15' 00"
