= Tour du Vaucluse =

Cycling race

Race details
- Date: early April
- Region: Vaucluse, France
- Discipline: Road race

History
- First edition: 1923
- Editions: 54
- Final edition: 1998
- First winner: Romain Bellenger (FRA)
- Most wins: Michel Laurent (FRA) (3 wins)
- Final winner: Benoît Salmon (FRA)

The Tour du Vaucluse (Tour of the Vaucluse) is a former cycling race, held in the Vaucluse department in the Provence-Alpes-Côte d'Azur region of France. From 1923 until 1960 it was organized as a one-day race finishing in Cavaillon. Subsequently, it was held as a stage race, run over two and later three days, until the event was discontinued in 1998.

== Palmarès ==
Edition	Winner	Second	Third
One-day race
1923	(France) Romain Bellenger	(France) José Pelletier	(France) Joseph Curtel
1924	(France) Maurice Ville	(France) Jean Hillarion	(France) Gaston Ducerisier
1930	(France) Louis Gras	(France) Maxime Calamel	(France) Ernest Neuhard
1931	(France) Maxime Calamel	(France) Henri Bergerioux	(France) Marius Guiramand
1932	(France) Maxime Calamel	(France) Giuseppe Cassin	(France) Georges Speicher
1933	(France) Georges Speicher	(France) Max Bulla	(Belgium) Louis Hardiquest
1934	(France) Jean Bidot	(France) Maurice Archambaud	(Italy) Edoardo Molinar
1935	(France) Jean Bidot	(France) Léon Level	(France) Maxime Calamel
1936	(Italy) Ettore Molinaro	(France) Fabien Galateau	(France) Luigi Barral
1937	(Italy) Giuseppe Cassin	(France) Henri Puppo	(France) Adrien Buttafocchi
1938	(Italy) Nello Troggi	(France) Amédée Rolland	(France) Georges Naisse
1939	(Italy) Dante Gianello	(Italy) Fermo Camellini	(France) Pierre Lorino
1941	(Italy) Domenico Zanti	(France) Pierre Canavese	(France) Paul Néri
1951	(France) Raoul Rémy	(France) Antonin Rolland	(France) Robert Chapatte
1952	(Spain) Jose Perez De Las Heras	(Italy) Siro Bianchi	(France) Antonin Rolland
1953	(France) Antonin Canavese	(France) Antonin Rolland	(France) Francis Anastasi
1954	(France) Raymond Elena	(France) André Payan	(Italy) Siro Bianchi
1955	(Australia) Russell Mockridge	(France) Raoul Rémy	(France) Antonin Canavese
1956	(France) Lucien Fliffel	(France) Guy Carle	(France) Marcel Ferri
1957	(France) Jean Dotto	(France) Gérard Bousquet	(France) Henry Anglade
1959	(France) Max Cohen	(Switzerland) Alcide Vaucher	(France) Fernand Lamy
1960	(France) René Fournier	(France) Anatole Novak	(Italy) Siro Bianchi
Stage race
1965	(France) Marcel Ferri	(France) Escudier	(France) Cenari
1966	(France) Francis Ducreux	(France) Serge Bolley	(France) Marcel Ferri
1967	(France) Paul Gutty	(France) Joseph Carrara	(France) Giorgetti
1968	(France) Pierre Martelozzo	(France) Combes	(France) Rault
1969	(France) Pierre Martelozzo	(Italy) Vittorio Cumino	(France) Francis Rigon
1970	(Italy) Mario Corti	(Italy) Giuseppe Maffeis	(Italy) Franco Baroni
1971	(Italy) Giuseppe Maffeis	(France) Claude Mazeaud	(Italy) Mario Corti
1972	no race		
1973	(Poland) Stanisław Szozda	(Spain) Fernando Plaza	(Poland) Ryszard Szurkowski
1974	(Poland) Jan Brzezny	(Poland) Tadeusz Mytnik	(Poland) B. Kieczynski
1975	(France) Patrick Marette	(France) Henri Berthillot	(France) Fr. Indalecio
1976	(East Germany) Hans-Joachim Hartnick	(Poland) Tadeusz Mytnik	(Bulgaria) Nentcho Staykov
1977	(East Germany) Bernd Drogan	(Italy) G. Fedrigo	(Poland) Tadeusz Mytnik
1978	(France) Michel Laurent	(Spain) Mariano Martínez	(France) Pierre-Raymond Villemiane
1979	(Poland) Czesław Lang	(Czechoslovakia) Zdenek Benacek	(France) Alain De Carvalho
1980	(France) Michel Laurent	(United Kingdom) Robert Millar	(France) Jean-François Rodriguez
1981	(France) Michel Laurent	(France) Bernard Thévenet	(France) Alain De Carvalho
1982	(France) Éric Caritoux	(France) Laurent Fignon	(Switzerland) Urs Zimmermann
1983	(France) Denis Roux	(France) André Chappuis	(France) Gilles Mas
1984	(France) Philippe Chevalier	(Italy) Davide Cassani	(France) Éric Salomon
1985	(France) Jean-Jacques Philippe	(France) Philippe Casado	(France) Hervé Doueil
1986	(France) Jérôme Simon	(France) Laurent Fignon	(East Germany) Uwe Ampler
1987	(France) Pascal Simon	(East Germany) Uwe Ampler	(France) Laurent Fignon
1988	(France) Charly Mottet	(Belgium) Claude Criquielion	(East Germany) Jan Schur
1989	(Netherlands) Steven Rooks	(France) Pascal Lance	(France) Éric Caritoux
1990	(Norway) Atle Kvålsvoll	(France) Thierry Bourguignon	(France) Luc Leblanc
1991	(Spain) Miguel Indurain	(France) Fabrice Philipot	(Belgium) Luc Roosen
1992	(France) Robert Forest	(Portugal) Orlando Rodrigues	(Russia) Dimitri Zhdanov
1993	(France) Thierry Bourguignon	(France) Pascal Hervé	(France) Jean-Christophe Currit
1994	(France) Blaise Chauviere	(Czech Republic) František Trkal	(Germany) Jens Zemke
1995	(Italy) Fabrizio Guidi	(France) Jean-Christophe Bloy	(France) Claude Lamour
1996	(Italy) Fabrizio Guidi	(Italy) Marco Vergnani	(Italy) Maurizio De Pasquale
1998	(France) Benoît Salmon	(Lithuania) Artūras Kasputis	(Switzerland) Daniel Schnider
