= José Magdalena =

Spanish cyclist (1889–1977)

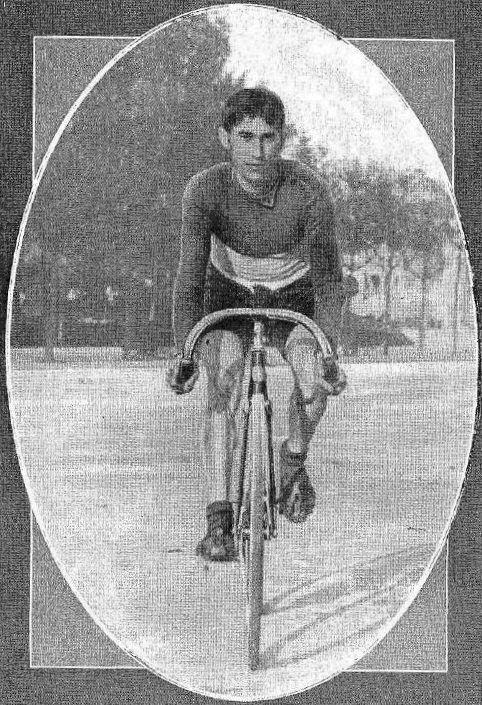
- Magdalena in 1913

Personal information
- Full name: José Magdalena Lafuente
- Born: 1889 Barcelona, Spain
- Died: 19 July 1977 (aged 87-88) Barcelona, Spain

Cycling career
- Sport: Cycling
- Discipline: Road
- Role: Rider

José Magdalena Lafuente (1889 – 19 July 1977) was a Spanish cyclist. He won the second edition of the Volta a Catalunya in 1912, as well as the Spanish National Road Race Championships in 1910 and 1912.

== Major results ==
1910
1st Road race, National Road Championships
1911
2nd Overall Volta a Catalunya
1912
1st Overall Volta a Catalunya

1st Stages 1, 2 & 3

1st Road race, National Road Championships
1914
3rd Road race, National Road Championships
1915
3rd Road race, National Road Championships
1916
3rd Road race, National Road Championships
