= 1911 Volta a Catalunya =

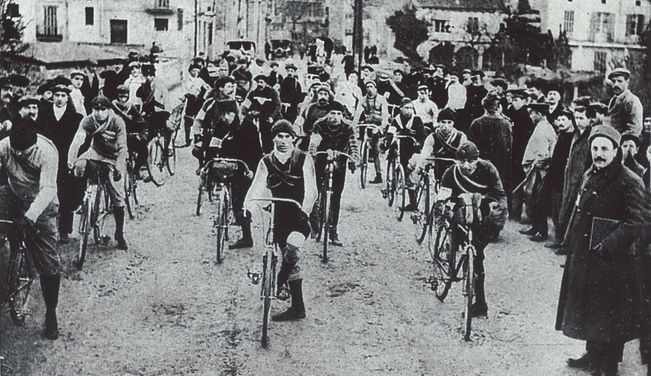
- The first departure of the Volta a Catalunya, in Barcelona

Race details
- Dates: 6–8 January 1911
- Stages: 3
- Distance: 365 km (226.8 mi)
- Winning time: 15h 30' 40"

Results
	Winner	Sebastián Masdeu (ESP)
	Second	José Magdalena (ESP)
	Third	Vicente Blanco (ESP)

The 1911 Volta a Catalunya was the inaugural edition of the Volta a Catalunya cycle race and was held from 6 January to 8 January 1911. The race started and finished in Barcelona. The race was won by Sebastián Masdeu.

== Starting cyclists ==
Of the 33 starting cyclists, 22 finished. The winner, Sebastián Masdeu, received 500 pesetas for his victory.

No.	Name	City	Bicycle	Category	Pos.
1	Guillermo Tarín	Tarragona	–	Senior	DNF
3	José Magdalena	Barcelona	Montpeó	Pro	2
4	José Bonet	Barcelona	Montpeó	Amateur	12
5	Juan Duarte	Barcelona	Montpeó	Amateur	16
9	Otilio Borrás	Barcelona	Santin	Pro	5
11	Jesús Roche	Barcelona	Montpeó	Amateur	8
12	Manuel Cascarosa	Barcelona	Montpeó	Amateur	13
13	Juan Matas	Barcelona	Montpeó	Amateur	18
15	Jesús Cuesta	Gijón	Cuesta	Pro	9
16	Marceliano Cuesta	Gijón	Cuesta	Pro	14
17	Manuel Garreta	Barcelona	Montpeó	Amateur	17
18	Vicente Linares	Barcelona	Carbonell-Vilardell	Amateur	4
19	Rafael Escoda	Barcelona	Montpeó	Senior	22
20	Vicente Blanco	Bilbao	Alcyon	Pro	3
21	Lorenzo Oca	Bilbao	Alcyon	Pro	11
22	Sebastián Masdeu	Tarragona	Sanromá	Pro	1
23	Jaime Durán	Tortosa	Casanovas	Pro	DNF
25	Carlos Gracia	Barcelona	Montpeó	Senior	DNF
26	Buenaventura Durán	Premià de Mar	Casanovas	Amateur	DNF
27	Cesáreo Ruiz	Logroño	Casanovas	Pro	6
29	José Pérez	Madrid	–	Pro	15
30	Antonio García	Madrid	Peugeot	Pro	DNF
31	Antonio Ruiz	Madrid	Peugeot	Pro	DNF
32	José Valcárcel	Madrid	Peugeot	Pro	21
34	Manuel Planell	Barcelona	Carbonell	Amateur	10
35	Pedro Giró	Barcelona	Sanromá	Amateur	7
36	Luis Amunategui	Madrid	Triumph	Pro	DNF
37	Lázaro Villada	Madrid	Peugeot	Pro	19
38	Cristóbal Raventós	La Granada	Montpeó	Amateur	DNF
39	Casto Coll	Manresa	Cantarell	Pro	DNF
40	Juan Pallarés	Barcelona	Coll	Amateur	20
41	José Cerrudo	Barcelona	Coll	Amateur	DNF
42	Ernesto Fondevila	Barcelona	Dürkopp	Amateur	DNF

== Route and stages ==
List of stages
Stage	Date	Course	Distance	Winner
1	6 January	Barcelona to Tarragona	97 km (60 mi)	Sebastián Masdeu (ESP)
2	7 January	Tarragona to Lleida	111 km (69 mi)	Cesáreo Ruiz (ESP)
3	8 January	Lleida to Barcelona	157 km (98 mi)	Sebastián Masdeu (ESP)
	Total		365 km (227 mi)	

== General classification ==
Final general classification

Final general classification (1–10)
Rank	Rider	Bicycle	Time
1	Sebastián Masdeu (ESP)	Sanromá	15h 30' 40"
2	José Magdalena (ESP)	Montpeó	+ 2' 46"
3	Vicente Blanco (ESP)	Alcyon	+ 17' 55"
4	Vicente Linares (ESP)	Carbonell-Vilardell	+ 46' 20"
5	Otilio Borrás (ESP)	Santin	+ 1h 12' 23"
6	Cesáreo Ruiz (ESP)	Casanovas	+ 1h 19' 49"
7	Pedro Giró (ESP)	Sanromá	+ 1h 42' 54"
8	Jesús Roche (ESP)	Montpeó	+ 1h 47' 49"
9	Jesús Cuesta (ESP)	Cuesta	+ 2h 01' 14"
10	Manuel Planell (ESP)	Carbonell	+ 2h 21' 48"

Final general classification (11–22)
Rank	Rider	Bicycle	Time
11	Lorenzo Oca (ESP)	Alcyon	+ 2h 26' 26"
12	José Bonet (ESP)	Montpeó	+ 2h 26' 40"
13	Manuel Cascarosa (ESP)	Montpeó	+ 2h 33' 49"
14	Marceliano Cuesta (ESP)	Cuesta	+ 2h 41' 14"
15	José Pérez (ESP)	–	+ 3h 10' 47"
16	Juan Duarte (ESP)	Montpeó	+ 3h 48' 10"
17	Manuel Garreta (ESP)	Montpeó	+ 3h 48' 28"
18	Juan Matas (ESP)	Montpeó	+ 4h 15' 52"
19	Lázaro Villada (ESP)	Peugeot	+ 4h 30' 34"
20	Juan Pallarés (ESP)	Coll	+ 4h 33' 56"
21	José Valcárcel (ESP)	Peugeot	+ 6h 15' 04"
22	Rafael Escoda (ESP)	Montpeó	+ 9h 22' 09"
