= 1930 Volta a Catalunya =

Race details
- Dates: 7–14 September 1930
- Stages: 8
- Distance: 1,428 km (887.3 mi)
- Winning time: 53h 17' 37"

Results
	Winner	Mariano Cañardo (ESP)
	Second	Marcel Maurel (FRA)
	Third	Ricardo Montero (ESP)

The 1930 Volta a Catalunya was the 12th edition of the Volta a Catalunya cycle race and was held from 7 September to 14 September 1930. The race started and finished in Barcelona. The race was won by Mariano Cañardo.

== Route and stages ==
List of stages
Stage	Date	Course	Distance	Winner
1	7 September	Barcelona to La Sénia	226 km (140 mi)	Mariano Cañardo (ESP)
2	8 September	La Sénia to Tarragona	155 km (96 mi)	Giuseppe Pancera (ITA)
3	9 September	Tarragona to Lleida	159 km (99 mi)	Giuseppe Pancera (ITA)
4	10 September	Lleida to Tremp	183 km (114 mi)	Mariano Cañardo (ESP)
5	11 September	Tremp to La Seu d'Urgell	234 km (145 mi)	Mariano Cañardo (ESP)
6	12 September	La Seu d'Urgell to Girona	172 km (107 mi)	Ricardo Montero (ESP)
7	13 September	Girona to Terrassa	199 km (124 mi)	Giuseppe Pancera (ITA)
8	14 September	Terrassa to Barcelona	131 km (81 mi)	Mariano Cañardo (ESP)
	Total		1,459 km (907 mi)	

== General classification ==
Final general classification

Rank	Rider	Time
1	Mariano Cañardo (ESP)	53h 17' 37"
2	Marcel Maurel (FRA)	+ 22' 05"
3	Ricardo Montero (ESP)	+ 30' 01"
4	Juan Mateu Ribé (ESP)	+ 35' 56"
5	Giuseppe Pancera (ITA)	+ 37' 39"
6	Pedro Albiñana (ESP)	+ 1h 10' 00"
7	Nicolás Tubau (ESP)	+ 1h 16' 39"
8	Julio Borrás (ESP)	+ 1h 21' 48"
9	Vicente Carrión (ESP)	+ 1h 42' 29"
10	Isaac Cano (ESP)	+ 2h 14' 39"
