= 1927 Tour of the Basque Country =

Race details
- Dates: 10–14 August 1927
- Stages: 4
- Distance: 747 km (464 mi)
- Winning time: 26h 33' 16"

Results
	Winner	Victor Fontan (FRA)
	Second	André Leducq (FRA)
	Third	Lucien Buysse (BEL)

The 1927 Tour of the Basque Country was the fourth edition of the Tour of the Basque Country cycle race and was held from 10 August to 14 August 1927. The race started in Bilbao and finished in Las Arenas. The race was won by Victor Fontan.

== General classification ==
Final general classification

Rank	Rider	Time
1	Victor Fontan (FRA)	26h 33' 16"
2	André Leducq (FRA)	+ 6' 24"
3	Lucien Buysse (BEL)	+ 15' 27"
4	Nicolas Frantz (LUX)	+ 24' 13"
5	Adelin Benoît (BEL)	+ 24' 13"
6	Georges Ronsse (BEL)	+ 25' 28"
7	Ricardo Montero (ESP)	+ 25' 48"
8	Aimé Dossche (BEL)	+ 37' 03"
9	Alfred Haemerlinck (BEL)	+ 37' 49"
10	Mariano Cañardo (ESP)	+ 43' 31"
