= 1926 Tour of the Basque Country =

Race details
- Dates: 4–8 August 1926
- Stages: 4
- Distance: 746 km (464 mi)
- Winning time: 26h 14' 09"

Results
	Winner	Nicolas Frantz (LUX)
	Second	Ottavio Bottecchia (ITA)
	Third	Victor Fontan (FRA)

The 1926 Tour of the Basque Country was the third edition of the Tour of the Basque Country cycle race and was held from 4 August to 8 August 1926. The race started in Bilbao and finished in Las Arenas. The race was won by Nicolas Frantz.

== General classification ==
Final general classification

Rank	Rider	Time
1	Nicolas Frantz (LUX)	26h 14' 09"
2	Ottavio Bottecchia (ITA)	+ 5' 39"
3	Victor Fontan (FRA)	+ 8' 39"
4	Julien Delbecque (BEL)	+ 8' 58"
5	Omer Huyse (BEL)	+ 11' 50"
6	Jean Debusschere (BEL)	+ 12' 20"
7	Alfonso Piccin (ITA)	+ 12' 58"
8	Gérard Debaets (BEL)	+ 19' 51"
9	Miguel Mucio (ESP)	+ 19' 54"
10	Théophile Beeckman (BEL)	+ 21' 14"
