= Victorino Otero =

Spanish cyclist (1896–1982)

Personal information
- Full name: Victorino Otero Alonso
- Born: 1896 San Andrés de las Puentes, Léon
- Died: 30 November 1982 (aged 85–86) Torrelavega, Cantabria

Cycling career
- Sport: Cycling
- Discipline: Road
- Role: Rider

Professional teams
- 1918–1924: Individual
- 1925: Gimnástica de Torrelavega
- 1926: Victoria
- 1927: Individual
- 1928: SC Cantabra

Victorino Otero Alonso (1896 – 30 November 1982) was a Spanish racing cyclist. He rode in the 1923 and 1924 editions of the Tour de France.

== Major results ==
1923
4th Overall Volta a Catalunya
1924
3rd Overall Volta a Catalunya
1925
2nd Overall Vuelta a Andalucía

1st Stage 2

1926
3rd Overall Vuelta a Cantabria

1st Stage 2

4th Overall Vuelta a Asturias
