= Juan Martí =

Spanish cyclist (1887–1978)

Joan Martí
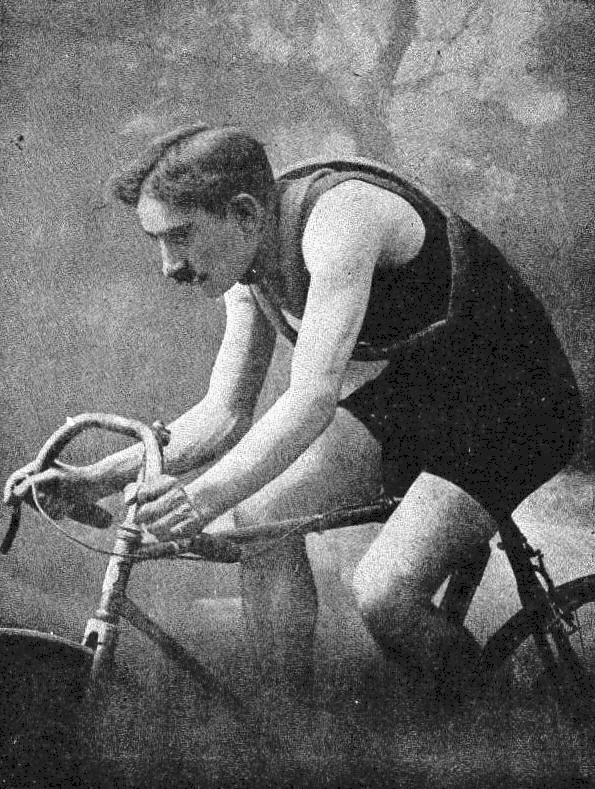
- Martí in 1913

Personal information
- Full name: Joan Martí Viñolas
- Nickname: Martí de la Garriga
- Born: 9 January 1887 La Garriga, Catalonia
- Died: 17 September 1978 (aged 91)

Cycling career
- Sport: Cycling
- Discipline: Road
- Role: Rider

Joan Martí Viñolas (9 January 1887 – 17 September 1978) was a Catalan cyclist. He won the third edition of the Volta a Catalunya in 1913 and the Spanish National Road Race Championships the same year. However, his career was cut short not long after due to the start of World War I.

== Major results ==
1913
1st Overall Volta a Catalunya

1st Stage 1

1st Road race, National Road Championships
1st Overall Vuelta al País Vasco y Navarra

1st Stage 4
