= 1912 Volta a Catalunya =

Race details
- Dates: 6–8 April 1912
- Stages: 3
- Distance: 427 km (265 mi)
- Winning time: 18h 32' 08"

Results
	Winner	José Magdalena (ESP)
	Second	Joaquín Martí (ESP)
	Third	Antonio Crespo (ESP)

Departure of the Cycling Tour of Catalonia (14/04/1912)

The 1912 Volta a Catalunya was the second edition of the Volta a Catalunya cycle race and was held from 6 April to 8 April 1912. The race started and finished in Barcelona. The race was won by José Magdalena.

== Route and stages ==
List of stages
Stage	Date	Course	Distance	Winner
1	6 April	Barcelona to Manresa	127 km (79 mi)	José Magdalena (ESP)
2	7 April	Manresa to Lleida	128 km (80 mi)	José Magdalena (ESP)
3	8 April	Lleida to Barcelona	172 km (107 mi)	José Magdalena (ESP)
	Total		427 km (265 mi)	

== General classification ==
Final general classification

Rank	Rider	Time
1	José Magdalena (ESP)	18h 32' 08"
2	Joaquín Martí (ESP)	+ 44' 16"
3	Antonio Crespo (ESP)	+ 56' 21"
4	Lázaro Villada (ESP)	+ 59' 40"
5	Joaquín Rubio (ESP)	+ 1h 17' 21"
6	Vicente Blanco (ESP)	+ 1h 37' 18"
7	Francisco Túnica (ESP)	+ 1h 43' 39"
8	Miguel Tusquella (ESP)	+ 2h 27' 00"
9	Manuel Planell (ESP)	+ 2h 28' 49"
10	José Pérez (ESP)	+ 2h 35' 28"
