= Prueba Villafranca de Ordizia =

Professional cycling race in Spain

Race details
- Date: Late July
- Region: Basque Country, Spain
- English name: Classic of Ordizia
- Local name(s): Clásica de Ordizia (in Spanish); Ordiziako Klasika (in Basque)
- Discipline: Road
- Competition: UCI Europe Tour
- Type: Single-day
- Web site: www.ordizia-pruebavillafranca.com/index.php

History
- First edition: 1922
- Editions: 103 (as of 2026)
- First winner: Francisco Sarasola (ESP)
- Most wins: Ricardo Montero (ESP) (5 wins)
- Most recent: Guillermo Thomas Silva (URU)

Prueba Villafranca de Ordizia – Clásica de Ordizia is a Spanish professional cycle road race held in Ordizia, Basque Country. The first edition was held in 1922. Since 2005, the race has been organized as a 1.1 event on the UCI Europe Tour.

== Winners ==
Year	Country	Rider	Team
1922	Spain	Francisco Sarasola	Etorri Alaiz
1923	Spain	Joaquim Lete	individual
1924	Spain	Cesareo Sarduy	Guernica Club
1925	Spain	Esteban Zubiaurre	C.D. Elgoibarres
1926	Spain	Lucas Jauregui	Etorri Alaiz
1927	Spain	Ricardo Montero	Real Unión Irun
1928	Spain	Miguel Mucio	Dilecta–Wolber
1929	Spain	Miguel Mucio	Dilecta–Wolber
1930	Spain	Ricardo Montero	Real Unión Irun
1931	Spain	Ricardo Montero	Real Unión Irun
1932	Spain	Ricardo Montero	Orbea
1933	Spain	Salvador Cardona	individual
1934	Spain	Emiliano Álvarez	individual
1935	Spain	Ricardo Montero	BH
1938	Spain	Fédérico Ezquerra	Sociedad Ciclista Bilbaina
1939	Spain	José Félix Escauriaza	individual
1940	Spain	Fédérico Ezquerra	individual
1941	Spain	Martin Mancisidor	individual
1942	Spain	Félix Vidaurreta	individual
1943	Spain	Martín Mancisidor	individual
1944	Spain	Ignacio Esnaola	individual
1945	Spain	Ignacio Esnaola	individual
1946	Spain	Juan Cruz Ganzarain	individual
1947	Spain	Juan Cruz Ganzarain	individual
1948	Spain	Francisco Exposito	individual
1949	Spain	Vicente Aramburu	individual
1950	Spain	José Orbegozo	individual
1951	Spain	Antonio Mendiburu	individual
1952	Spain	Manuel Aizpuru	individual
1953	Spain	Hortensio Vidaurreta	individual
1954	Spain	Hortensio Vidaurreta	Ideor
1955	Spain	José Urrestarazu	individual
1956	Spain	José Michelena	Boxing Club
1957	Spain	José Michelena	Real Unión Irun–Palmera
1958	Spain	Facundo Zabaleta	Mobylette–GAC
1959	Spain	José Luis Talamillo	Boxing Club
1960	Spain	Luis Goya	Karpy
1961	Spain	Roberto Morales	Licor 43
1962	Spain	Sebastián Elorza	Funcor–Munguia
1963	Spain	Antonio Barrutia	Kas–Kaskol
1964	Spain	José Pérez Francés	Ferrys
1965	Spain	Roberto Morales	Olsa
1966	Spain	Antonio Gómez del Moral	Kas–Kaskol
1967	Spain	Francisco Otaola	Kas–Kaskol
1968	Spain	Gregorio San Miguel	Kas–Kaskol
1969	Spain	Miguel María Lasa	Pepsi Cola
1970	Spain	Francisco Gabica	Kas–Kaskol
1971	Spain	Domingo Perurena	Kas–Kaskol
1972	Spain	Domingo Perurena	Kas–Kaskol
1973	Spain	Santiago Lazcano	Kas–Kaskol
1974	Spain	José Pesarrodona	Kas–Kaskol
1975	France	Pierre-Raymond Villemiane	amateur
1976	Spain	Domingo Perurena	Kas–Campagnolo
1977	Spain	Vicente López Carril	Kas–Campagnolo
1978	Spain	Miguel María Lasa	Teka
1979	Spain	Faustino Rupérez	Moliner–Vereco
1980	Spain	Ismael Lejarreta	Teka
1981	Spain	Marino Lejarreta	Teka–Campagnolo
1982	Spain	Faustino Rupérez	Zor–Helios
1983	Spain	José Recio	Kelme
1984	Spain	Pedro Muñoz	Teka
1985	Spain	Iñaki Gastón	Reynolds
1986	Germany	Peter Hilse	Teka
1987	France	Claude Séguy	Fagor–MBK
1988	Spain	Marino Lejarreta	Caja Rural–Orbea
1989	Spain	Marino Lejarreta	Paternina
1990	Spain	Miguel Ángel Martínez Torres	ONCE
1991	Australia	Neil Stephens	ONCE
1992	Spain	Abraham Olano	Lotus–Festina
1993	Australia	Neil Stephens	ONCE
1994	Australia	Neil Stephens	ONCE
1995	Australia	Neil Stephens	ONCE
1996	Spain	Aitor Garmendia	ONCE
1997	France	Laurent Lefèvre	Festina–Lotus
1998	Belgium	Frank Vandenbroucke	Mapei–Bricobi
1999	France	Laurent Jalabert	ONCE–Deutsche Bank
2000	Spain	Javier Otxoa	Kelme–Costa Blanca
2001	United States	David Clinger	Festina
2002	Spain	Mikel Zarrabeitia	ONCE–Eroski
2003	Spain	Alejandro Valverde	Kelme–Costa Blanca
2004	Spain	David Herrero Llorente	Costa de Almería–Paternina
2005	Spain	Carlos García Quesada	Comunidad Valenciana
2006	Colombia	Félix Cardenas	Barloworld
2007	Spain	Joaquim Rodríguez	Caisse d'Epargne
2008	Russia	Vladimir Karpets	Caisse d'Epargne
2009	Spain	Jaume Rovira	Andorra–Grandvalira
2010	Spain	Gorka Izagirre	Euskaltel–Euskadi
2011	France	Julien Simon	Saur–Sojasun
2012	Spain	Gorka Izagirre	Euskaltel–Euskadi
2013	Eritrea	Daniel Teklehaymanot	Orica–GreenEDGE
2014	Spain	Gorka Izagirre	Movistar Team
2015	Spain	Ángel Madrazo	Caja Rural–Seguros RGA
2016	Great Britain	Simon Yates	Orica–BikeExchange
2017	Russia	Sergey Shilov	Lokosphinx
2018	Australia	Robert Power	Mitchelton–Scott
2019	Spain	Rafael Valls	Movistar Team
2020	Great Britain	Simon Carr	Nippo–Delko–One Provence
2021	Spain	Luis León Sánchez	Astana–Premier Tech
2022	Great Britain	Simon Yates	Team BikeExchange–Jayco
2023	Switzerland	Marc Hirschi	UAE Team Emirates
2024	Switzerland	Jan Christen	UAE Team Emirates
2025	Spain	Igor Arrieta	UAE Team Emirates XRG
2026	Uruguay	Guillermo Thomas Silva	XDS Astana Team
