= 1924 Paris–Roubaix =

Cycling race

Race details
- Dates: 6 April 1924
- Stages: 1
- Distance: 270 km (167.8 mi)
- Winning time: 10h 34' 00"

Results
	Winner	Jules Van Hevel (BEL)
	Second	Maurice Ville (FRA)
	Third	Félix Sellier (BEL)

The 1924 Paris–Roubaix was the 25th edition of the Paris–Roubaix, a classic one-day cycle race in France. The single day event was held on 6 April 1924 and stretched 270 km (168 mi) from Paris to its end in a velodrome in Roubaix. The winner was Jules Van Hevel from Belgium.

== Results ==
Final results (1–10)
Rank	Cyclist	Time
1	Jules Van Hevel (BEL)	10h 34' 00″
2	Maurice Ville (FRA)	+0' 00″
3	Félix Sellier (BEL)	+0' 00″
4	Nicolas Frantz (LUX)	+0' 00″
5	Henri Pélissier (FRA)	+0' 00″
6	Robert Gerbaud (FRA)	+0' 00″
7	Theofiel Beeckman (BEL)	+0' 00″
8	Romain Bellenger (FRA)	+0' 00″
9	Adelin Benoit (BEL)	+0' 00″
10	Gérard Debaets (BEL)	+0' 00″
