= 1927 Volta a Catalunya =

Race details
- Dates: 28 August–4 September 1927
- Stages: 8
- Distance: 1,342 km (833.9 mi)
- Winning time: 51h 03' 34"

Results
	Winner	Victor Fontan (FRA)
	Second	Mariano Cañardo (ESP)
	Third	Georges Cuvelier (FRA)

The 1927 Volta a Catalunya was the ninth edition of the Volta a Catalunya cycle race and was held from 28 August to 4 September 1927. The race started and finished in Barcelona. The race was won by Victor Fontan.

== Route and stages ==
List of stages
Stage	Date	Course	Distance	Winner
1	28 August	Barcelona to Tortosa	213 km (132 mi)	Maurice Ville (FRA)
2	29 August	Tortosa to Reus	204 km (127 mi)	Ferdinand Le Drogo (FRA)
3	30 August	Reus to Igualada	189 km (117 mi)	Victor Fontan (FRA)
4	31 August	Igualada to Vic	191 km (119 mi)	Georges Cuvelier (FRA)
5	1 September	Vic to Banyoles	122 km (76 mi)	Georges Cuvelier (FRA)
6	2 September	Banyoles to Sant Feliu de Guíxols	163 km (101 mi)	Ferdinand Le Drogo (FRA)
7	3 September	Sant Feliu de Guíxols to Caldes d'Estrac	121 km (75 mi)	Georges Cuvelier (FRA)
8	4 September	Caldes d'Estrac to Barcelona	130 km (81 mi)	Victor Fontan (FRA)
	Total		1,333 km (828 mi)	

== General classification ==
Final general classification

Rank	Rider	Time
1	Victor Fontan (FRA)	51h 03' 34"
2	Mariano Cañardo (ESP)	+ 3' 01"
3	Georges Cuvelier (FRA)	+ 12' 02"
4	Giuseppe Pancera (ITA)	+ 23' 51"
5	Juan Mateu Ribé (ESP)	+ 1h 02' 33"
6	Julio Borràs (ESP)	+ 1h 05' 14"
7	Joan Juan Cañellas (ESP)	+ 1h 25' 25"
8	Ferdinand Le Drogo (FRA)	+ 1h 48' 46"
9	José Pons (ESP)	+ 1h 59' 18"
10	José María Murcia (ESP)	+ 1h 59' 46"
