= 1935 Volta a Catalunya =

Race details
- Dates: 1–9 June 1935
- Stages: 9
- Distance: 1,358 km (843.8 mi)
- Winning time: 44h 55' 55"

Results
	Winner	Mariano Cañardo (ESP)
	Second	Fédérico Ezquerra (ESP)
	Third	Joseph Huts (BEL)

The 1935 Volta a Catalunya was the 17th edition of the Volta a Catalunya cycle race and was held from 1 June to 9 June 1935. The race started and finished in Barcelona. The race was won by Mariano Cañardo.

== Route and stages ==
List of stages
Stage	Date	Course	Distance	Winner
1	1 June	Barcelona to Manresa	87 km (54 mi)	Joseph Huts (BEL)
2	2 June	Manresa to Tarragona	150 km (93 mi)	Arsène Mersch (LUX)
3	3 June	Tarragona to Gandesa	189 km (117 mi)	Mariano Cañardo (ESP)
4	4 June	Gandesa to Valls	137 km (85 mi)	Mariano Cañardo (ESP)
5	5 June	Valls to Puigcerdà	223 km (139 mi)	Joseph Huts (BEL)
6	6 June	Puigcerdà to Girona	150 km (93 mi)	Salvador Cardona (ESP)
7	7 June	Girona to La Bisbal d'Empordà	170 km (106 mi)	Salvador Cardona (ESP)
8	8 June	La Bisbal d'Empordà to Terrassa	149 km (93 mi)	Federico Ezquerra (ESP)
9	9 June	Terrassa to Barcelona	84 km (52 mi)	Mariano Cañardo (ESP)
	Total		1,339 km (832 mi)	

== General classification ==
Final general classification

Rank	Rider	Time
1	Mariano Cañardo (ESP)	44h 55' 55"
2	Fédérico Ezquerra (ESP)	+ 10' 48"
3	Joseph Huts (BEL)	+ 14' 42"
4	Antonio Andrés Sancho (ESP)	+ 14' 55"
5	Antonio Destrieux (ESP)	+ 18' 24"
6	Salvador Cardona (ESP)	+ 20' 17"
7	Diego Cháfer (ESP)	+ 20' 25"
8	Cipriano Elys (ESP)	+ 30' 01"
9	Rafael Pou (ESP)	+ 31' 38"
10	Isidre Figueras (ESP)	+ 32' 03"
