= Mució Miquel =

Spanish cyclist (1902–1945)

Muç Miquel
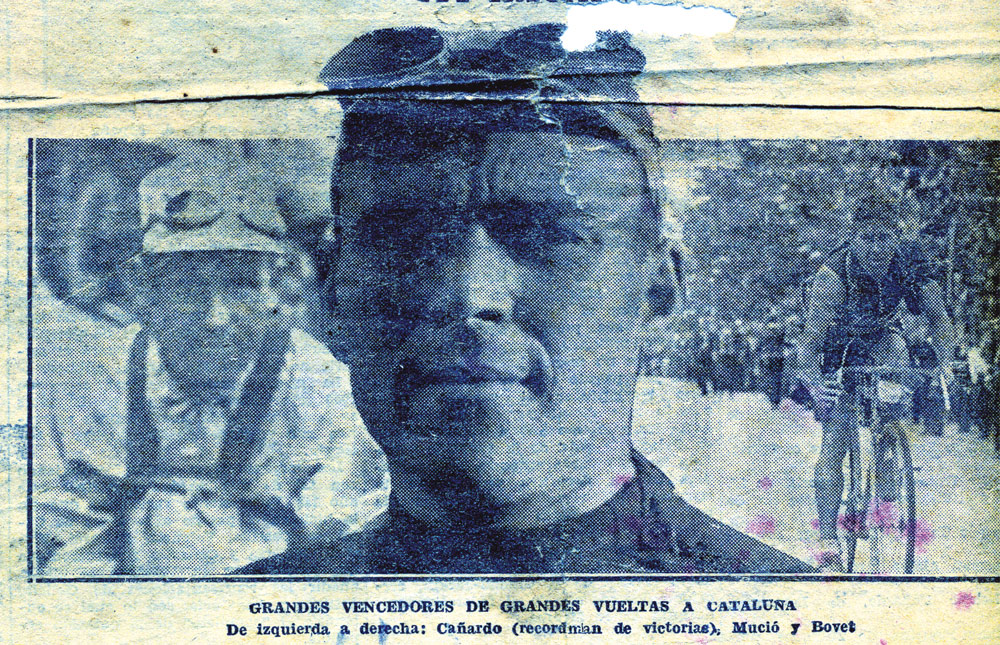
- A newspaper clipping from after Miquel won the Volta a Catalunya.

Personal information
- Full name: Mució Joseph Emmanuel Miquel
- Born: 12 March 1902 Barcelona, Spain
- Died: 27 May 1945 (aged 43) Lübtheen, Germany

Cycling career
- Sport: Cycling
- Discipline: Road
- Role: Rider

Professional teams
- 1923: Individual
- 1924–1925: UE Sants
- 1926: UE Sant Andreu
- 1927: FC Barcelona
- 1928–1929: Dilecta–Wolber

Mució Joseph Emmanuel Miquel (12 March 1902 – 27 May 1945), also known as Muç Miquel and Miguel Mucio, was a Catalan cyclist who most notably won the Volta a Catalunya in 1924 and 1925 as well as the Spanish National Road Race Championships in 1927.

A member of the Unified Socialist Party of Catalonia and Communist Party of Spain, Miquel fled his homeland following the end of the Spanish Civil War. During World War II, he served as a member of the Francs-Tireurs et Partisans. He was imprisoned by the Gestapo in 1944 and imprisoned in Neuengamme concentration camp. Following the liberation of the camp in 1945, German workers murdered Miquel and many other prisoners by poisoning their food.

== Major results ==
1923
3rd Road race, National Road Championships
5th Overall Volta a Catalunya
1924
1st Overall Volta a Catalunya

1st Stages 1 & 3

9th Overall Tour of the Basque Country
1925
1st Overall Volta a Catalunya

1st Stage 1

1926
2nd Overall Volta a Catalunya
2nd Overall Vuelta a Asturias
9th Overall Tour of the Basque Country
1927
1st Road race, National Road Championships
1st Overall Vuelta a Asturias

1st Stage 1

3rd GP Viscaya
1928
1st Prueba Villafranca de Ordizia
2nd Overall Volta a Catalunya
