= Andorra–Grandvalira =

Team information
- UCI code: ANG
- Registered: Andorra
- Founded: 2009
- Disbanded: 2009
- Discipline: Road
- Status: UCI Continental
- Bicycles: Massi

Key personnel
- General manager: Melcior Mauri
- Team manager: Domènec Carbonell

Team name history
- 2009: Andorra–Grandvalira

Andorra–Grandvalira was an Andorran UCI Continental cycling team that existed only for the 2009 season. The team was run by Melcior Mauri who created the team and chose the riders.

== Team roster ==
As of 31 December 2009.

Rider	Date of birth
Luis Felipe Alves De Oliveira (AND)	1 May 1982 (aged 27)
Aitor Aznar (ESP)	23 April 1986 (aged 23)
Sergio Brito Da Costa Sousa (AND)	25 November 1983 (aged 26)
Dmytro Chuzhda (UKR)	24 August 1987 (aged 22)
Sergi Escobar (ESP)	22 September 1974 (aged 35)
Egoitz García (ESP)	31 March 1986 (aged 23)
Raúl García de Mateos (ESP)	5 July 1982 (aged 27)
Vicente García de Mateos (ESP)	19 September 1988 (aged 21)
Xavier Lopez Calero (AND)	16 June 1981 (aged 28)
Helder Lopez Ribeiro (AND)	11 December 1986 (aged 23)

Rider	Date of birth
Julio Moa Sanchez (AND)	4 April 1986 (aged 23)
Indaleci Perez Tapies (AND)	27 January 1990 (aged 19)
Eduard Prades (ESP)	9 August 1987 (aged 22)
Aitor Punzano Martinez (AND)	3 December 1987 (aged 22)
Dmitry Puzanov (RUS)	23 October 1982 (aged 27)
José Luis Ramos (ESP)	11 March 1983 (aged 26)
Julio Sanchez (VEN)	5 January 1987 (aged 22)
Jaume Rovira (ESP)	3 November 1979 (aged 30)
Carlos Torrent (ESP)	26 August 1974 (aged 35)
Ángel Vallejo (ESP)	1 April 1981 (aged 28)

== Major wins ==
2009
Prueba Villafranca de Ordizia, Jaume Rovira
