= Jaume Rovira (cyclist) =

Spanish cyclist

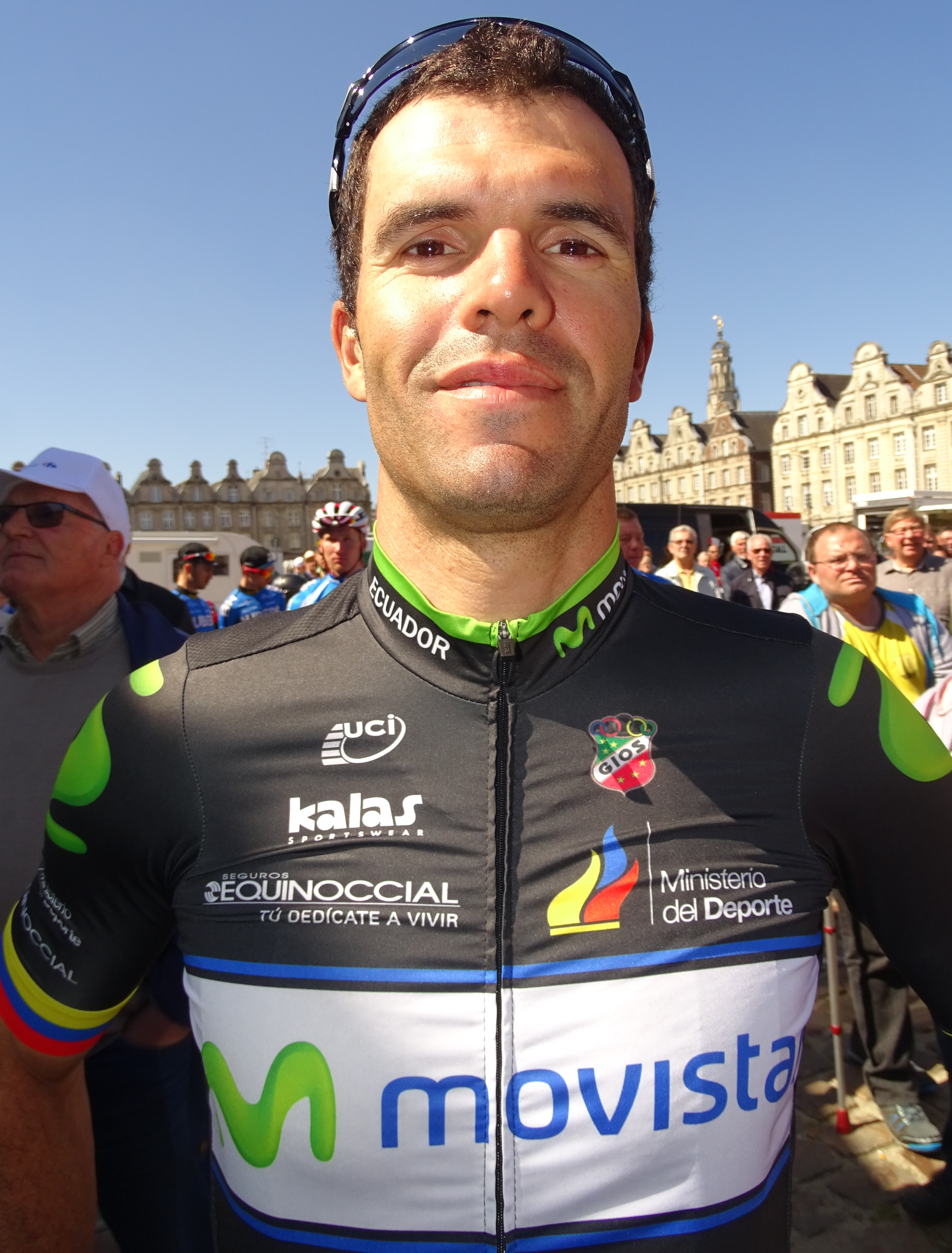

Personal information
- Born: 3 November 1979 (age 46) Villablino, Spain

Cycling career
- Sport: Cycling
- Current team: Retired
- Discipline: Road
- Role: Rider

Professional teams
- 2005–2006: Andalucía–Paul Versan
- 2007: Viña Magna–Cropu
- 2008: Extremadura
- 2009: Andorra–Grandvalira
- 2010–2012: Heraklion Kastro–Murcia
- 2014–2015: Team Ecuador

Jaume Rovira (born 3 November 1979) is a Spanish former racing cyclist. He rode at the 2014 UCI Road World Championships.

== Major results ==
2003
2nd Overall Vuelta Ciclista a León

1st Points classification
1st Stage 5

5th Clásica Memorial Txuma
2004
1st Stage 3 Vuelta a Palencia
1st Stage 1 Giro Ciclistico della Provincia di Cosenza
2nd Overall Copa de España
6th Overall Vuelta a la Comunidad de Madrid
2005
3rd Overall Vuelta a La Rioja
10th Subida al Naranco
2006
1st GP Llodio
4th Overall Vuelta a la Rioja
7th Klasika Primavera
2007
3rd Overall Circuito Montañés
5th GP Villafranca de Ordizia
7th Overall Vuelta a la Comunidad de Madrid
7th Subida al Naranco
10th Overall Vuelta a Asturias
2008
4th Road race, National Road Championships
5th Overall Euskal Bizikleta
5th Subida al Naranco
10th Overall Vuelta a Asturias
2009
1st Prueba Villafranca de Ordizia
5th Overall Vuelta a Murcia
9th Subida al Naranco
9th Overall Cinturó de l'Empordà
10th Overall Troféu Joaquim Agostinho
2011
7th Overall International Tour of Hellas
2012
7th Overall Vuelta Ciclista a León
2014
1st Stages 6 & 8 Vuelta al Ecuador
