= 1913 Volta a Catalunya =

Race details
- Dates: 6–8 September 1913
- Stages: 3
- Distance: 448 km (278.4 mi)
- Winning time: 18h 56' 23"

Results
	Winner	Juan Martí (ESP)
	Second	Antonio Crespo (ESP)
	Third	Guillermo Antón (ESP)

The 1913 Volta a Catalunya was the third edition of the Volta a Catalunya cycle race and was held from 6 September to 8 September 1913. The race started and finished in Barcelona. The race was won by Juan Martí.

== Route and stages ==
List of stages
Stage	Date	Course	Distance	Winner
1	6 September	Barcelona to Lleida	190 km (118 mi)	Juan Martí (ESP)
2	7 September	Lleida to Manresa	128 km (80 mi)	Antonio Crespo (ESP)
3	8 September	Manresa to Barcelona	130 km (81 mi)	Antonio Crespo (ESP)
	Total		448 km (278 mi)	

== General classification ==
Final general classification

Rank	Rider	Time
1	Juan Martí (ESP)	18h 56' 23"
2	Antonio Crespo (ESP)	+ 18' 13"
3	Guillermo Antón (ESP)	+ 50' 23"
4	Francisco Tunica (ESP)	+ 1h 25' 28"
5	Joaquín Anson (ESP)	+ 1h 27' 19"
6	Pascual Service (ESP)	+ 1h 34' 39"
7	Tomás Fuentes (ESP)	+ 1h 40' 49"
8	Salvador Marqués (ESP)	+ 1h 58' 21"
9	Pascual Mezquita (ESP)	+ 3h 01' 07"
10	Víctor Sammarini (ESP)	+ 3h 18' 52"
