= Ricardo Montero (cyclist) =

Spanish cyclist (1902–1974)

Personal information
- Born: 9 July 1902 Gemuño, Spain
- Died: 19 December 1974 (aged 72) Valladolid, Spain

Cycling career
- Sport: Cycling
- Discipline: Road
- Role: Rider

Professional teams
- 1924–1931: Real Union Irun
- 1932–1933: Orbea
- 1934–1935: BH

Ricardo Montero (9 July 1902 – 19 December 1974) was a Spanish racing cyclist. In 1925 he won the Vuelta a Andalucía.

== Major results ==
1925
1st Road race, National Road Championships
1st Overall Vuelta a Andalucía

1st Stage 1

1926
1st Overall Vuelta Asturias

1st Stages 1, 2 & 3

1st GP Vizcaya
1st Prueba Loinaz
3rd Road race, National Road Championships
3rd GP Villafranca de Ordizia
1927
1st GP Villafranca de Ordizia
1st GP Pascuas
1st GP Vizcaya
2nd Overall Vuelta Asturias
7th Overall Tour of the Basque Country
1928
1st Overall Vuelta Asturias
3rd Clásica a los Puertos de Guadarrama
4th Road race, National Road Championships
5th Overall Tour of the Basque Country

1st Stage 1

1929
1st Prueba Legazpia
1930
1st GP Villafranca de Ordizia
1st Stage 2 Tour of the Basque Country
1st Prueba Legazpia
3rd Overall Volta a Catalunya

1st Stage 6

6th Road race, UCI Road World Championships
1931
1st GP Villafranca de Ordizia
1st Subida a Urkiola
1st GP Vizcaya
1932
1st Overall Vuelta a la Comunidad Valenciana

1st Stages 1 & 3

1st Clásica a los Puertos de Guadarrama
1st GP Villafranca de Ordizia
1st Prueba Legazpia
2nd GP Vizcaya
4th Road race, UCI Road World Championships
9th Overall Volta a Catalunya
1933
1st Stage 2 Vuelta a Pontevedra
1935
1st GP Villafranca de Ordizia
3rd Clásica a los Puertos de Guadarrama
