= 1928 Volta a Catalunya =

Race details
- Dates: 8–16 September 1928
- Stages: 9
- Distance: 1,421 km (883.0 mi)
- Winning time: 51h 03' 36"

Results
	Winner	Mariano Cañardo (ESP)
	Second	Miguel Mucio (ESP)
	Third	Julio Borrás (ESP)

The 1928 Volta a Catalunya was the tenth edition of the Volta a Catalunya cycle race and was held from 8 September to 16 September 1928. The race started and finished in Barcelona. The race was won by Mariano Cañardo.

== Route and stages ==
List of stages
Stage	Date	Course	Distance	Winner
1	8 September	Barcelona to Tortosa	213 km (132 mi)	Mariano Cañardo (ESP)
2	9 September	Tortosa to Reus	204 km (127 mi)	Mariano Cañardo (ESP)
3	10 September	Reus to Tàrrega	141 km (88 mi)	Giuseppe Pancera (ITA)
4	11 September	Tàrrega to Puigcerdà	170 km (106 mi)	Carlo Porzio (ITA)
5	12 September	Puigcerdà to Figueres	180 km (112 mi)	Julio Borrás (ESP)
6	13 September	Figueres to Palafrugell	161 km (100 mi)	Mariano Cañardo (ESP)
7	14 September	Palafrugell to Banyoles	90 km (56 mi)	Manuel Martínez (ESP)
8	15 September	Banyoles to Gironella	150 km (93 mi)	Valeriano Riera (ESP)
9	16 September	Gironella to Barcelona	112 km (70 mi)	Marcel Autaa (FRA)
	Total		1,421 km (883 mi)	

== General classification ==
Final general classification

Rank	Rider	Time
1	Mariano Cañardo (ESP)	51h 03' 36"
2	Miguel Mucio (ESP)	+ 5' 04"
3	Julio Borrás (ESP)	+ 18' 33"
4	Valeriano Riera (ESP)	+ 55' 58"
5	José María Figueras (ESP)	+ 57' 19"
6	Manuel Martínez (ESP)	+ 1h 03' 08"
7	Juan Segarra (ESP)	+ 1h 09' 49"
8	Ricard Ferrando (ESP)	+ 1h 25' 39"
9	Juan Bibiloni (ESP)	+ 1h 28' 28"
10	José María Palleras (ESP)	+ 1h 34' 32"
