= John Devine (cyclist) =

American cyclist

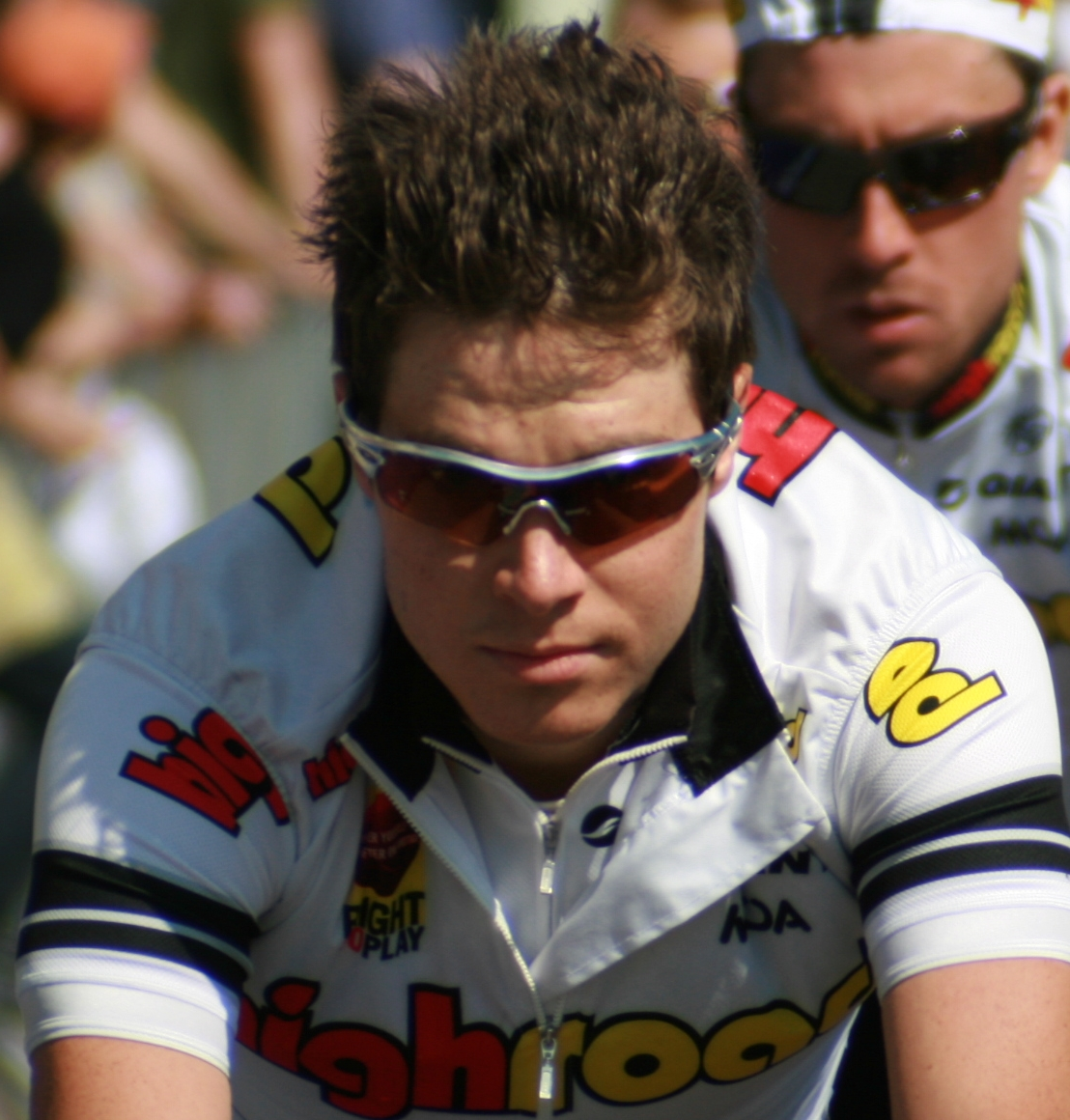

Personal information
- Full name: John Devine
- Born: November 2, 1985 (age 40) United States
- Height: 1.78 m (5 ft 10 in)
- Weight: 64 kg (141 lb)

Cycling career
- Sport: Cycling
- Current team: Retired
- Discipline: Road
- Role: Rider

Professional teams
- 2007: Discovery Channel
- 2008: Team High Road

John Devine (born November 2, 1985, in Dixon, Illinois) is an American former professional road bicycle racer.

== Major results ==
2005
10th Overall Triptyque des Monts et Châteaux
2006
3rd Overall Volta a Tarragona
2007
1st Overall Ronde de l'Isard d'Ariège

1st Stage 2

1st Overall Volta a Tarragona

1st Stage 5a

7th Overall Grand Prix du Portugal
