= Maurice Ville =

French cyclist

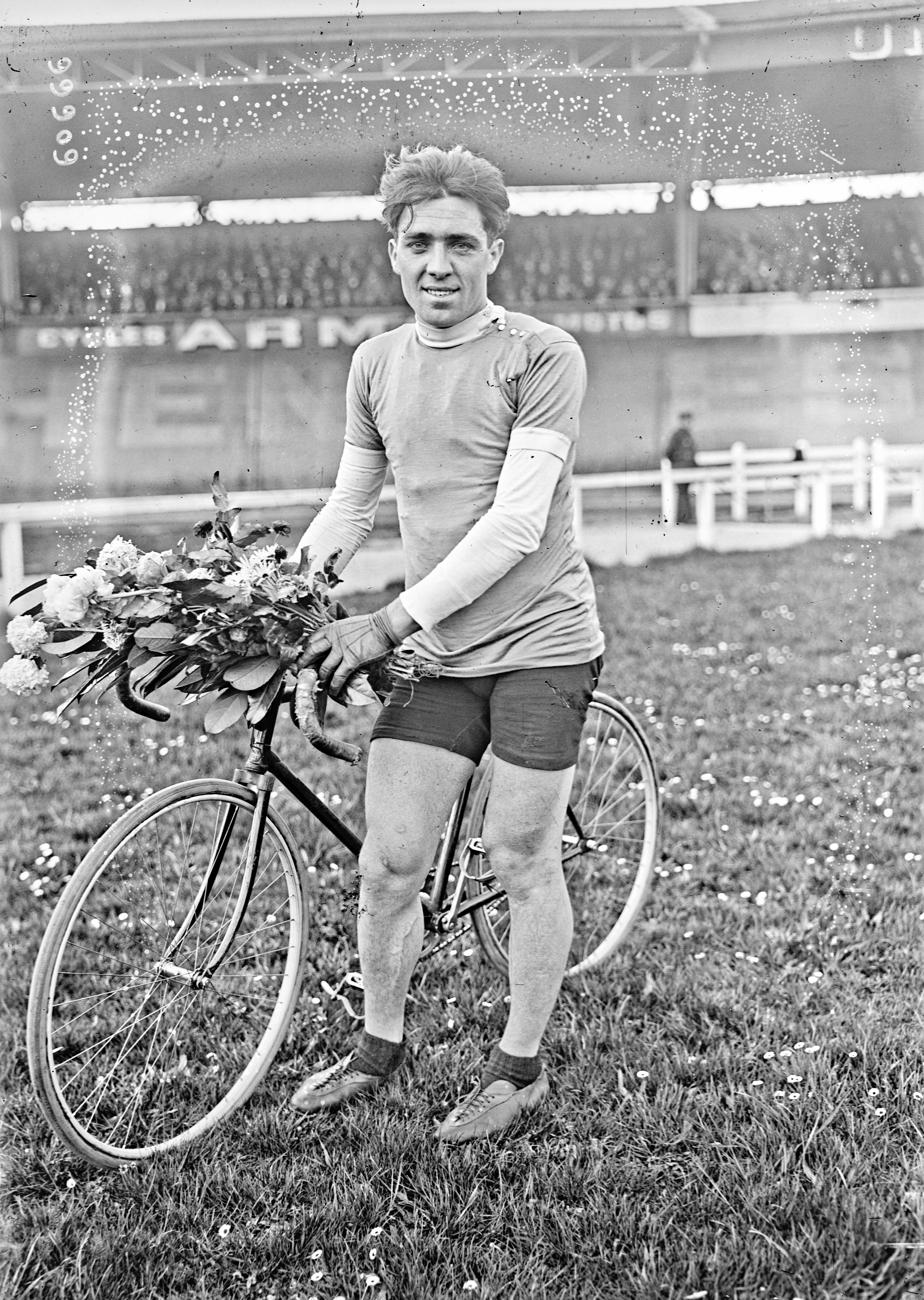

Personal information
- Born: 30 October 1900 Saint-Denis, Seine-Saint-Denis, France
- Died: 12 April 1982 (aged 81) Bobigny, France

Cycling career
- Sport: Cycling
- Discipline: Road
- Role: Rider

Professional teams
- 1923: Automoto–Hutchinson
- 1924–1926: Individual
- 1927: Opel-ZR III
- 1928: Individual

Maurice Ville (30 October 1900 – 12 April 1982) was a French racing cyclist. He was born on October 30, 1901 in Clichy, France. He rode in the 1924 Tour de France, where he finished 2nd in stages 1 and 2, but dropped out on the 3rd stage. He also won the 1923 Volta a Catalunya and finished 2nd in the 1924 Paris–Roubaix.

== Major results ==
1923
1st Overall Volta a Catalunya

1st Stages 1, 2 & 4

1st Stage 1 Critérium du Midi
1st Stage 2 Paris–Saint-Étienne
2nd Circuit des villes d'eaux d'Auvergne
1924
1st Tour du Vaucluse
2nd Paris–Roubaix
2nd Overall Criterium des Aiglons
5th Paris–Tours
1927
1st Stage 1 Volta a Catalunya
1928
1st Paris–Contres
