= Jules Huyvaert =

Belgian cyclist

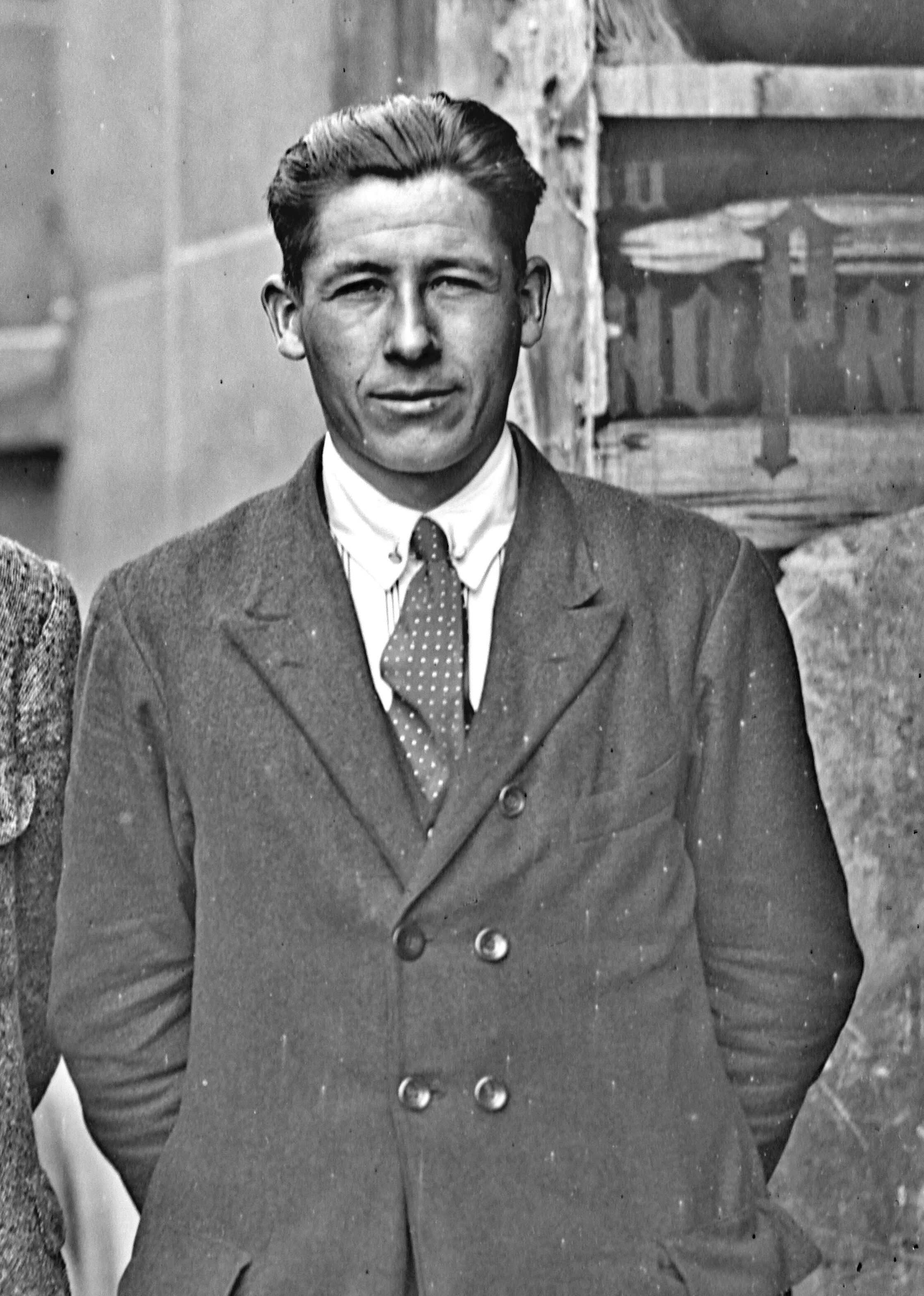
- Jules Huyvaert in 1924

Personal information
- Born: 3 January 1896
- Died: 27 January 1960 (aged 64)

Cycling career
- Sport: Cycling
- Discipline: Road
- Role: Rider

Jules Huyvaert (3 January 1896 – 27 January 1960) was a Belgian racing cyclist. He rode in the 1924 Tour de France.
