= José Pelletier =

French cyclist

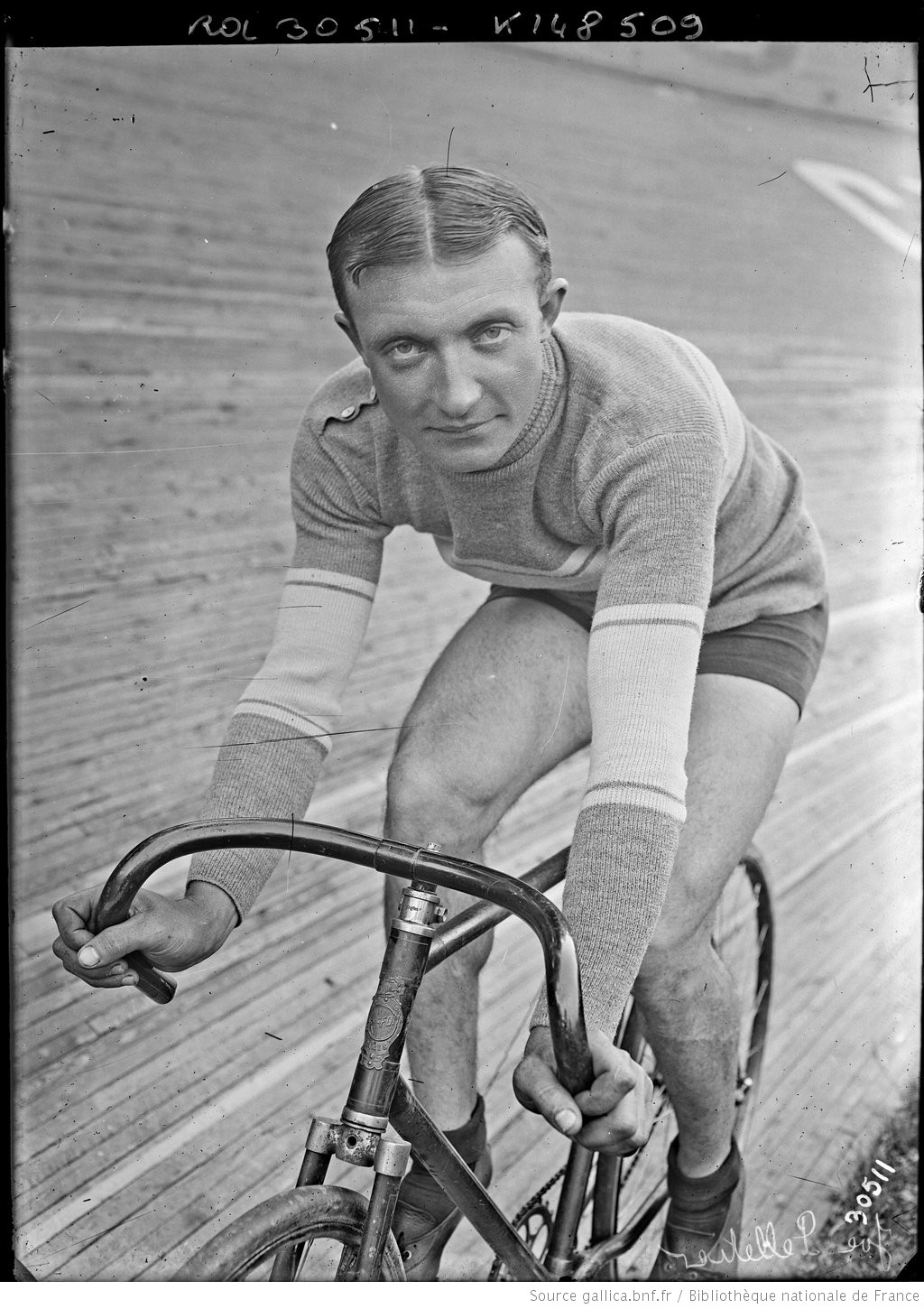

Personal information
- Born: 30 August 1888 Artaix, France
- Died: 14 February 1970 (aged 81) Artaix, France

Cycling career
- Sport: Cycling
- Discipline: Road
- Role: Rider

José Pelletier (30 August 1888 – 14 February 1970) was a French racing cyclist. He rode in four editions of the Tour de France and won the 1920 Volta a Catalunya.

== Major results ==
1913
5th Paris–Bourges
1919
1st Overall Volta a Tarragona

1st Stages 3 & 4

1920
1st Overall Volta a Catalunya

1st Stages 1a, 1b, 2 & 3

1921
1st Overall Marseille–Lyon
1922
1st Overall Marseille–Lyon

1st Stages 1a, 1b, 2 & 3

1923
1st Tour du Vaucluse
1st Paris–Chauny
2nd Overall Volta a Catalunya

1st Stage 3

1924
1st Circuit des Monts du Roannais
2nd Paris-Nancy
1926
1st Overall Tour du Sud-Est

1st Stage 4
