= Joseph Cassin =

Italian cyclist

Personal information
- Born: 1 November 1906
- Died: 24 April 1940 (aged 33)

Cycling career
- Sport: Cycling
- Discipline: Road
- Role: Rider

Joseph Cassin (1 November 1906 – 24 April 1940) was an Italian racing cyclist. He rode in the 1925 Tour de France.
