= Volta a Tarragona =

Annual road cycling race

Race details
- Date: May-June
- Region: Province of Tarragona, Spain
- English name: Tour of Tarragona
- Discipline: Road
- Type: Stage race
- Organiser: Reus Ploms

History
- First edition: 1908
- Editions: 51
- Final edition: 2010
- First winner: Paul Mazan (FRA)
- Final winner: Aurelien Ribet (FRA)

The Volta a Tarragona was a multi-day road cycling race held annually in the Province of Tarragona, Spain. The race took place from 1908 until 2010.

== Winners ==
Year	Winner	Second	Third
1908	(France) Paul Mazan	(Germany) Johann Hohe	(France) Henri-André Carrère
1909-1918	No race		
1919	(France) José Pelletier	(Tunisia) Ali Neffati	(Spain) Guillermo Antón
1920-1947	No race		
1948	(Spain) Bernardo Capó	(Spain) José Serra	(Spain) Manuel Costa
1949-1953	No race		
1954	(Spain) Bernardo Ruiz	(Spain) Francisco Massip	(Spain) Francisco Alomar
1955-1963	No race		
1964			
1965			
1966			
1967			
1968			
1969	(Spain) José Manuel Fuente		
1970			
1971	(France) Jean-Michel Richeux		
1972			
1973			
1974			
1975			
1976			
1977			
1978			
1979	(Spain) Jesús Guzmán Delgado	(Spain) José Luis Laguía	
1980	(Spain) Pedro Delgado		(France) Pierre Le Bigaut
1981	(Spain) José Recio		
1982			
1983	(Spain) Xavier Castellar	(Spain) Pello Ruiz Cabestany	(Spain) Antoni Girabent Montoya
1984	(France) Loïc Le Flohic		
1985			(Spain) Josep Pedrero Serrano
1986	(France) Thierry Quiviger		
1987			
1988	(France) Philippe Dalibard	(France) Pierre-Henri Menthéour	(Spain) José Mario Genesca
1989	(Spain) Antonio Sánchez	(Spain) Ramón Antonio Rota	(Spain) Fernando Pinero
1990			
1991	(Spain) Antonio Martín	(France) Émile Julia	
1992			
1993			
1994	(Russia) Nicolai Koudriavtchev	(Russia) Sergei Ivanov	(Spain) Josep Jacob Viladoms
1995	(Russia) Sergei Ivanov	(Russia) Dmitri Parfimovitch	(France) Philippe Le Peurien
1996	(Russia) Sergei Gritchenko	(Spain) Manuel Rodríguez	(Russia) Edouard Gritsoun
1997	(Russia) Edouard Gritsoun	(Netherlands) Martin Van Steen	(Spain) Marc Prat
1998	(Russia) Denis Menchov	(Spain) Eloy Coca	(Spain) Carlos Torrent
1999	(Netherlands) Wim Van Den Meulenhof	(Spain) Gonzalo Bayarri	(Spain) Tomàs Valls
2000	(Spain) Rafael Fernandez	(Russia) Faat Zakirov	(Spain) Xavier Tondo
2001	(Ukraine) Alexander Rotar	(Spain) Rafael Vilá	(Spain) Vicente Elvira
2002	(Spain) Héctor Guerra	(Spain) José Alfredo Medina	(Spain) Javier Ramírez Abeja
2003	(Spain) Fernando Serrano	(Spain) Miquel Alandete	(Spain) Sergi Escobar
2004	(Spain) Joaquín Jorge Soler	(Spain) Didac Cuadros	(Spain) Antonio López
2005	(Costa Rica) Paulo Vargas	(Spain) Isidro Cerrato	(Spain) Óscar Vicente Garau
2006	(Spain) Juan Carlos Cariñena	(Spain) Alberto Fernández	(United States) John Devine
2007	(United States) John Devine	(Spain) Luis Ángel Maté	(Spain) Francisco José Villalgordo
2008	(Spain) Sergi Escobar	(Spain) Javier Ramírez Abeja	(Spain) Raúl García de Mateos
2009	(France) Colin Menc	(Russia) Arkimedes Arguelyes	(France) Jonathan Brunel
2010	(France) Aurelien Ribet	(United States) Andrew Talansky	(France) Thomas Lebas
