= José Nat =

French cyclist

Personal information
- Born: 12 September 1887 Montauban, France
- Died: 15 June 1962 (aged 74) Montauban, France

Cycling career
- Sport: Cycling
- Role: Rider

José Nat (12 September 1887 – 15 June 1962) was a French racing cyclist. He rode in the 1920 Tour de France.
