= Samuel Tequi =

French cyclist

Personal information
- Born: 10 November 1898 Saint-Juéry, France
- Died: 8 November 1979 (aged 80) Toulouse, France

Cycling career
- Sport: Cycling
- Discipline: Road
- Role: Rider

Samuel Tequi (10 November 1898 – 8 November 1979) was a French racing cyclist. He rode in the 1926 Tour de France.
