= Jaime Janer =

Spanish cyclist (1900–1941)

Personal information
- Born: 20 May 1900
- Died: 3 October 1941 (aged 41)

Cycling career
- Sport: Cycling
- Role: Rider

Jaime Janer (20 May 1900 – 3 October 1941) was a Spanish racing cyclist. He rode in the 1920 Tour de France.
