= List of teams and cyclists in the 1939 Tour de France =

List of cyclists

Italy, Germany and Spain did not send teams to the 1939 Tour de France. The Tour organisation were short on participating cyclists, because of this. To solve the problem, they allowed Belgium to send two teams, and France to send four additional regional teams.

The French cyclists had been successful in the 1930s, but their Tour winners were absent in 1939: 1930 and 1932 winner André Leducq had retired in 1938, as had 1931 and 1934 winner Antonin Magne; 1933 winner Georges Speicher did not ride, and 1937 winner Roger Lapébie was injured. This all made the Belgian team favourite.

== By rider ==
Legend
No.	Starting number worn by the rider during the Tour
Pos.	Position in the general classification
DNF	Denotes a rider who did not finish

No.	Name	Nationality	Team	Pos.	Ref
1	Sylvère Maes	Belgium	Belgium	1	
2	Félicien Vervaecke	Belgium	Belgium	DNF	
3	Edward Vissers	Belgium	Belgium	5	
4	Marcel Kint	Belgium	Belgium	34	
5	Lucien Storme	Belgium	Belgium	DNF	
6	Albert Hendrickx	Belgium	Belgium	26	
7	François Neuville	Belgium	Belgium	27	
8	Romain Maes	Belgium	Belgium	DNF	
9	Karl Litschi	Switzerland	Switzerland	DNF	
10	Werner Jaisli	Switzerland	Switzerland	DNF	
11	Josef Wagner	Switzerland	Switzerland	30	
12	Walter Gross	Switzerland	Switzerland	DNF	
13	Théo Perret	Switzerland	Switzerland	41	
14	Karl Wyss	Switzerland	Switzerland	DNF	
15	Ettore Maestranzi	Switzerland	Switzerland	DNF	
16	René Pedroli	Switzerland	Switzerland	44	
17	Jean Majerus	Luxembourg	Luxembourg	DNF	
18	Pierre Clemens	Luxembourg	Luxembourg	20	
19	Mathias Clemens	Luxembourg	Luxembourg	4	
20	François Neuens	Luxembourg	Luxembourg	42	
21	Arsène Mersch	Luxembourg	Luxembourg	DNF	
22	Grégoire Leisen	Luxembourg	Luxembourg	DNF	
23	Christophe Didier	Luxembourg	Luxembourg	18	
24	Lucien Bidinger	Luxembourg	Luxembourg	DNF	
25	Albert van Schendel	Netherlands	Netherlands	15	
26	Antoon van Schendel	Netherlands	Netherlands	38	
27	Janus Hellemons	Netherlands	Netherlands	46	
28	Jan Lambrichs	Netherlands	Netherlands	8	
29	Jozef Dominicus	Netherlands	Netherlands	39	
30	Jan Gommers	Netherlands	Netherlands	DNF	
31	André de Korver	Netherlands	Netherlands	28	
32	Hubert Sijen	Netherlands	Netherlands	DNF	
33	Auguste Mallet	France	France	13	
34	Georges Naisse	France	France	19	
35	Lucien Le Guével	France	France	35	
36	Victor Cosson	France	France	25	
37	Sylvain Marcaillou	France	France	6	
38	Pierre Jaminet	France	France	DNF	
39	Dante Gianello	France	France	11	
40	Raymond Louviot	France	France	29	
41	Albertin Disseaux	Belgium	Belgium B	7	
42	Jules Lowie	Belgium	Belgium B	DNF	
43	Lucien Vlaemynck	Belgium	Belgium B	3	
44	Albert Ritserveldt	Belgium	Belgium B	9	
45	Éloi Meulenberg	Belgium	Belgium B	DNF	
46	Cyriel Vanoverberghe	Belgium	Belgium B	10	
47	Albert Perikel	Belgium	Belgium B	21	
48	Edmond Delathouwer	Belgium	Belgium B	DNF	
49	Maurice Archambaud	France	France – North-East/Île de France	14	
50	Fernand Mithouard	France	France – North-East/Île de France	DNF	
51	Louis Thiétard	France	France – North-East/Île de France	17	
52	Pierre Gallien	France	France – North-East/Île de France	16	
53	Gabriel Dubois	France	France – North-East/Île de France	DNF	
54	Amédée Fournier	France	France – North-East/Île de France	47	
55	Roger Bailleux	France	France – North-East/Île de France	DNF	
56	Victor Codron	France	France – North-East/Île de France	40	
57	René Le Grevès	France	France – West	45	
58	Pierre Cloarec	France	France – West	31	
59	Christophe Taëron	France	France – West	DNF	
60	Jean Fontenay	France	France – West	43	
61	Armand Le Moal	France	France – West	49	
62	Yvan Marie	France	France – West	DNF	
63	Albert Goutal	France	France – West	DNF	
64	Eloi Tassin	France	France – West	32	
65	Paul Maye	France	France – South-West	DNF	
66	Jean Fréchaut	France	France – South-West	DNF	
67	Gérard Virol	France	France – South-West	DNF	
68	Edmond Pagès	France	France – South-West	23	
69	André Bramard	France	France – South-West	DNF	
70	Joffre Daran	France	France – South-West	DNF	
71	François Garcia	France	France – South-West	DNF	
72	Raymond Passat	France	France – South-West	12	
73	Oreste Bernardoni	France	France – South-East	24	
74	René Vietto	France	France – South-East	2	
75	Charles Berty	France	France – South-East	33	
76	Joseph Soffietti	France	France – South-East	48	
77	Gabriel Bouffier	France	France – South-East	DNF	
78	Trino Yelamos	France	France – South-East	36	
79	Fabien Galateau	France	France – South-East	22	
80	Joseph Aureille	France	France – South-East	37	
