= 1939 Tour de France, Stage 1 to Stage 10c =

Cycling race stages

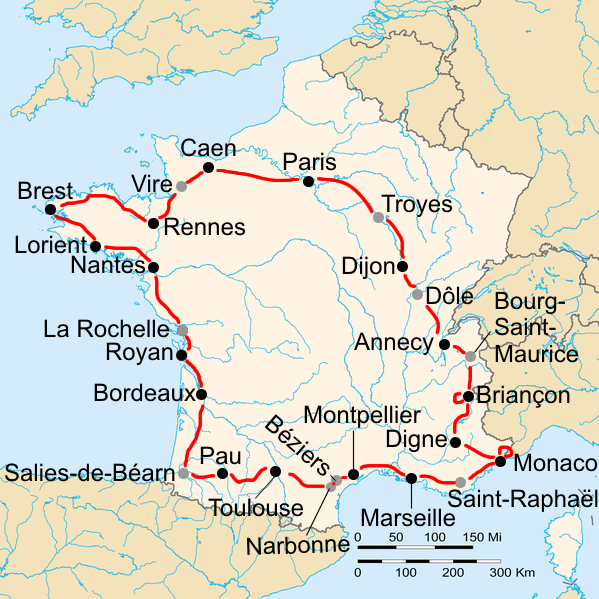
Route of the 1939 Tour de France

The 1939 Tour de France was the 33rd edition of Tour de France, one of cycling's Grand Tours. The Tour began in Paris with a flat stage on 10 July, and Stage 10c occurred on 21 July with a flat stage to Montpellier. The race finished in Paris on 30 July.

== Stage 1 ==
10 July 1939 — Paris to Caen, 215 km (134 mi)

Stage 1 result and general classification after stage 1

| Rank | Rider | Team | Time |
|---|---|---|---|
| 1 | Amédée Fournier (FRA) | France – North-East/Île de France | 6h 21' 27" |
| 2 | Romain Maes (BEL) | Belgium | s.t. |
| 3 | Marcel Kint (BEL) | Belgium | s.t. |
| 4 | Edmond Delathouwer (BEL) | Belgium B | s.t. |
| 5 | Eloi Tassin (FRA) | France – West | s.t. |
| 6 | Jan Lambrichs (NED) | Netherlands | s.t. |
| 7 | Fabien Galateau (FRA) | France – South-East | s.t. |
| 8 | Lucien Storme (BEL) | Belgium | s.t. |
| 9 | Raymond Passat (FRA) | France – South-West | s.t. |
| 10 | Auguste Mallet (FRA) | France | + 46" |

== Stage 2a ==
11 July 1939 — Caen to Vire, 63.5 km (39.5 mi) (ITT)

Stage 2a result

| Rank | Rider | Team | Time |
|---|---|---|---|
| 1 | Romain Maes (BEL) | Belgium | 1h 40' 13" |
| 2 | Jan Lambrichs (NED) | Netherlands | + 24" |
| 3 | Karl Litschi (SUI) | Switzerland | + 1' 18" |
| 4 | Félicien Vervaecke (BEL) | Belgium | + 1' 24" |
| =5 | Jean Fontenay (FRA) | France – West | + 1' 53" |
| =5 | Yvan Marie (FRA) | France – West | s.t. |
| 7 | Sylvère Maes (BEL) | Belgium | + 2' 11" |
| 8 | Louis Thiétard (FRA) | France – North-East/Île de France | + 2' 13" |
| 9 | Lucien Vlaemynck (BEL) | Belgium B | + 2' 32" |
| 10 | Lucien Storme (BEL) | Belgium | + 2' 37" |

General classification after stage 2a

| Rank | Rider | Team | Time |
|---|---|---|---|
| 1 | Romain Maes (BEL) | Belgium | |
| 2 | Jan Lambrichs (NED) | Netherlands | + 1' 24" |
| 3 | Félicien Vervaecke (BEL) | Belgium | + 2' 42" |
| 4 | | | |
| 5 | | | |
| 6 | | | |
| 7 | | | |
| 8 | | | |
| 9 | | | |
| 10 | | | |

== Stage 2b ==
21 July 1939 — Vire to Rennes, 119.5 km (74.3 mi)

Stage 2b result

| Rank | Rider | Team | Time |
|---|---|---|---|
| 1 | Eloi Tassin (FRA) | France – West | 3h 10' 45" |
| 2 | Jean Fontenay (FRA) | France – West | + 9" |
| 3 | Albertin Disseaux (BEL) | Belgium B | s.t. |
| 4 | Victor Cosson (FRA) | France | s.t. |
| 5 | René Vietto (FRA) | France – South-East | s.t. |
| 6 | Oreste Bernardoni (FRA) | France – South-East | s.t. |
| 7 | Fabien Galateau (FRA) | France – South-East | + 27" |
| 8 | Mathias Clemens (LUX) | Luxembourg | + 32" |
| 9 | Georges Naisse (FRA) | France | s.t. |
| 10 | Armand Le Moal (FRA) | France – West | s.t. |

General classification after stage 2b

| Rank | Rider | Team | Time |
|---|---|---|---|
| 1 | Jean Fontenay (FRA) | France – West | |
| 2 | René Vietto (FRA) | France – South-East | + 2' 10" |
| 3 | Eloi Tassin (FRA) | France – West | + 2' 11" |
| 4 | | | |
| 5 | | | |
| 6 | | | |
| 7 | | | |
| 8 | | | |
| 9 | | | |
| 10 | | | |

== Stage 3 ==
12 July 1939 — Rennes to Brest, 244 km (152 mi)

Stage 3 result

| Rank | Rider | Team | Time |
|---|---|---|---|
| 1 | Pierre Cloarec (FRA) | France – West | 6h 52' 30" |
| 2 | Antoon van Schendel (NED) | Netherlands | + 13" |
| 3 | Edmond Delathouwer (BEL) | Belgium B | + 24" |
| 4 | Dante Gianello (FRA) | France | + 44" |
| 5 | René Le Grevès (FRA) | France – West | + 50" |
| 6 | Paul Maye (FRA) | France – South-West | s.t. |
| 7 | Éloi Meulenberg (BEL) | Belgium B | s.t. |
| 8 | Jean Fréchaut (FRA) | France – South-West | s.t. |
| =9 | Sylvère Maes (BEL) | Belgium | s.t. |
| =9 | Félicien Vervaecke (BEL) | Belgium | s.t. |

General classification after stage 3

| Rank | Rider | Team | Time |
|---|---|---|---|
| 1 | Jean Fontenay (FRA) | France – West | |
| 2 | René Vietto (FRA) | France – South-East | + 2' 10" |
| 3 | Eloi Tassin (FRA) | France – West | + 2' 11" |
| 4 | | | |
| 5 | | | |
| 6 | | | |
| 7 | | | |
| 8 | | | |
| 9 | | | |
| 10 | | | |

== Stage 4 ==
13 July 1939 — Brest to Lorient, 174 km (108 mi)

Stage 4 result

| Rank | Rider | Team | Time |
|---|---|---|---|
| 1 | Raymond Louviot (FRA) | France | 4h 38' 56" |
| 2 | Albert van Schendel (NED) | Netherlands | s.t. |
| 3 | Karl Litschi (SUI) | Switzerland | s.t. |
| 4 | Albertin Disseaux (BEL) | Belgium B | s.t. |
| 5 | Lucien Bidinger (LUX) | Luxembourg | s.t. |
| 6 | Pierre Clemens (LUX) | Luxembourg | s.t. |
| 7 | René Vietto (FRA) | France – South-East | s.t. |
| 8 | Mathias Clemens (LUX) | Luxembourg | s.t. |
| 9 | André de Korver (NED) | Netherlands | + 2' 43" |
| 10 | Armand Le Moal (FRA) | France – West | s.t. |

General classification after stage 4

| Rank | Rider | Team | Time |
|---|---|---|---|
| 1 | René Vietto (FRA) | France – South-East | |
| 2 | Mathias Clemens (LUX) | Luxembourg | + 6" |
| 3 | Albertin Disseaux (BEL) | Belgium B | + 1' 06" |
| 4 | | | |
| 5 | | | |
| 6 | | | |
| 7 | | | |
| 8 | | | |
| 9 | | | |
| 10 | | | |

== Stage 5 ==
14 July 1939 — Lorient to Nantes, 207 km (129 mi)

Stage 5 result

| Rank | Rider | Team | Time |
|---|---|---|---|
| 1 | Amédée Fournier (FRA) | France – North-East/Île de France | 5h 40' 13" |
| 2 | Jean Fréchaut (FRA) | France – South-West | s.t. |
| 3 | Éloi Meulenberg (BEL) | Belgium B | s.t. |
| 4 | Maurice Archambaud (FRA) | France – North-East/Île de France | s.t. |
| 5 | Sylvère Maes (BEL) | Belgium | s.t. |
| =6 | Lucien Vlaemynck (BEL) | Belgium B | s.t. |
| =6 | Albert van Schendel (NED) | Netherlands | s.t. |
| =6 | Albert Ritserveldt (BEL) | Belgium B | s.t. |
| =6 | Romain Maes (BEL) | Belgium | s.t. |
| =6 | Sylvain Marcaillou (FRA) | France | s.t. |

General classification after stage 5

| Rank | Rider | Team | Time |
|---|---|---|---|
| 1 | René Vietto (FRA) | France – South-East | |
| 2 | Mathias Clemens (LUX) | Luxembourg | + 6" |
| 3 | Albertin Disseaux (BEL) | Belgium B | + 1' 06" |
| 4 | | | |
| 5 | | | |
| 6 | | | |
| 7 | | | |
| 8 | | | |
| 9 | | | |
| 10 | | | |

== Stage 6a ==
15 July 1939 — Nantes to La Rochelle, 144 km (89 mi)

Stage 6a result

| Rank | Rider | Team | Time |
|---|---|---|---|
| 1 | Lucien Storme (BEL) | Belgium | 4h 23' 05" |
| 2 | Maurice Archambaud (FRA) | France – North-East/Île de France | s.t. |
| 3 | Félicien Vervaecke (BEL) | Belgium | s.t. |
| 4 | Romain Maes (BEL) | Belgium | + 45" |
| 5 | André de Korver (NED) | Netherlands | s.t. |
| 6 | Arsène Mersch (LUX) | Luxembourg | s.t. |
| 7 | Albert Ritserveldt (BEL) | Belgium B | s.t. |
| =8 | Sylvère Maes (BEL) | Belgium | s.t. |
| =8 | Edward Vissers (BEL) | Belgium | s.t. |
| =8 | Marcel Kint (BEL) | Belgium | s.t. |

General classification after stage 6a

| Rank | Rider | Team | Time |
|---|---|---|---|
| 1 | René Vietto (FRA) | France – South-East | |
| 2 | Mathias Clemens (LUX) | Luxembourg | + 6" |
| 3 | Albertin Disseaux (BEL) | Belgium B | + 1' 06" |
| 4 | | | |
| 5 | | | |
| 6 | | | |
| 7 | | | |
| 8 | | | |
| 9 | | | |
| 10 | | | |

== Stage 6b ==
15 July 1939 — La Rochelle to Royan, 107 km (66 mi)

Stage 6b result

| Rank | Rider | Team | Time |
|---|---|---|---|
| 1 | Edmond Pagès (FRA) | France – South-West | 3h 00' 23" |
| 2 | Roger Bailleux (FRA) | France – North-East/Île de France | + 10" |
| 3 | René Le Grevès (FRA) | France – West | + 28" |
| 4 | Louis Thiétard (FRA) | France – North-East/Île de France | s.t. |
| 5 | Pierre Jaminet (FRA) | France | s.t. |
| 6 | Jean Fréchaut (FRA) | France – South-West | s.t. |
| 7 | Fabien Galateau (FRA) | France – South-East | s.t. |
| =8 | Sylvère Maes (BEL) | Belgium | s.t. |
| =8 | Félicien Vervaecke (BEL) | Belgium | s.t. |
| =8 | Edward Vissers (BEL) | Belgium | s.t. |

General classification after stage 6b

| Rank | Rider | Team | Time |
|---|---|---|---|
| 1 | René Vietto (FRA) | France – South-East | |
| 2 | Mathias Clemens (LUX) | Luxembourg | + 6" |
| 3 | Albertin Disseaux (BEL) | Belgium B | + 1' 06" |
| 4 | | | |
| 5 | | | |
| 6 | | | |
| 7 | | | |
| 8 | | | |
| 9 | | | |
| 10 | | | |

== Stage 7 ==
17 July 1939 — Royan to Bordeaux, 198 km (123 mi)

Stage 7 result

| Rank | Rider | Team | Time |
|---|---|---|---|
| 1 | Raymond Passat (FRA) | France – South-West | 5h 47' 16" |
| 2 | André de Korver (NED) | Netherlands | s.t. |
| 3 | Cyriel Vanoverberghe (BEL) | Belgium B | s.t. |
| 4 | Jules Lowie (BEL) | Belgium B | s.t. |
| 5 | Paul Maye (FRA) | France – South-West | + 1' 31" |
| 6 | Pierre Jaminet (FRA) | France | s.t. |
| 7 | Louis Thiétard (FRA) | France – North-East/Île de France | s.t. |
| 8 | Romain Maes (BEL) | Belgium | s.t. |
| 9 | Théo Perret (SUI) | Switzerland | s.t. |
| 10 | Albert Ritserveldt (BEL) | Belgium B | s.t. |

General classification after stage 7

| Rank | Rider | Team | Time |
|---|---|---|---|
| 1 | René Vietto (FRA) | France – South-East | |
| 2 | Mathias Clemens (LUX) | Luxembourg | + 6" |
| 3 | Albertin Disseaux (BEL) | Belgium B | + 1' 06" |
| 4 | | | |
| 5 | | | |
| 6 | | | |
| 7 | | | |
| 8 | | | |
| 9 | | | |
| 10 | | | |

== Stage 8a ==
18 July 1939 — Bordeaux to Salies-de-Béarn, 210.5 km (130.8 mi)

Stage 8a result

| Rank | Rider | Team | Time |
|---|---|---|---|
| 1 | Marcel Kint (BEL) | Belgium | 6h 35' 43" |
| 2 | Fabien Galateau (FRA) | France – South-East | s.t. |
| 3 | Jean Fréchaut (FRA) | France – South-West | s.t. |
| 4 | Antoon van Schendel (NED) | Netherlands | + 28" |
| 5 | Lucien Storme (BEL) | Belgium | + 52" |
| 6 | Charles Berty (FRA) | France – South-East | s.t. |
| 7 | Raymond Louviot (FRA) | France | s.t. |
| 8 | Cyriel Vanoverberghe (BEL) | Belgium B | s.t. |
| 9 | Auguste Mallet (FRA) | France | s.t. |
| 10 | Edmond Pagès (FRA) | France – South-West | s.t. |

General classification after stage 8a

| Rank | Rider | Team | Time |
|---|---|---|---|
| 1 | René Vietto (FRA) | France – South-East | |
| 2 | Mathias Clemens (LUX) | Luxembourg | + 6" |
| 3 | Albertin Disseaux (BEL) | Belgium B | + 1' 06" |
| 4 | | | |
| 5 | | | |
| 6 | | | |
| 7 | | | |
| 8 | | | |
| 9 | | | |
| 10 | | | |

== Stage 8b ==
18 July 1939 — Salies-de-Béarn to Pau, 68.5 km (42.6 mi) (ITT)

Stage 8b result

| Rank | Rider | Team | Time |
|---|---|---|---|
| 1 | Karl Litschi (SUI) | Switzerland | 1h 52' 05" |
| 2 | Maurice Archambaud (FRA) | France – North-East/Île de France | + 14" |
| 3 | Lucien Vlaemynck (BEL) | Belgium B | + 1' 22" |
| 4 | Sylvère Maes (BEL) | Belgium | + 2' 03" |
| 5 | Jan Lambrichs (NED) | Netherlands | + 2' 11" |
| 6 | Félicien Vervaecke (BEL) | Belgium | + 2' 53" |
| 7 | Eloi Tassin (FRA) | France – West | + 3' 09" |
| 8 | Edward Vissers (BEL) | Belgium | + 4' 08" |
| =9 | Albert Hendrickx (BEL) | Belgium | + 4' 15" |
| =9 | François Neuville (BEL) | Belgium | s.t. |

General classification after stage 8b

| Rank | Rider | Team | Time |
|---|---|---|---|
| 1 | René Vietto (FRA) | France – South-East | |
| 2 | Albertin Disseaux (BEL) | Belgium B | + 58" |
| 3 | Lucien Vlaemynck (BEL) | Belgium B | + 2' 37" |
| 4 | | | |
| 5 | | | |
| 6 | | | |
| 7 | | | |
| 8 | | | |
| 9 | | | |
| 10 | | | |

== Stage 9 ==
19 July 1939 — Pau to Toulouse, 311 km (193 mi)

Stage 9 result

| Rank | Rider | Team | Time |
|---|---|---|---|
| 1 | Edward Vissers (BEL) | Belgium | 10h 23' 27" |
| 2 | Sylvère Maes (BEL) | Belgium | + 4' 04" |
| 3 | Albert Ritserveldt (BEL) | Belgium B | s.t. |
| 4 | Dante Gianello (FRA) | France | s.t. |
| 5 | René Vietto (FRA) | France – South-East | s.t. |
| 6 | Sylvain Marcaillou (FRA) | France | + 7' 42" |
| 7 | Jan Lambrichs (NED) | Netherlands | s.t. |
| 8 | Christophe Didier (LUX) | Luxembourg | s.t. |
| 9 | Auguste Mallet (FRA) | France | s.t. |
| 10 | Lucien Vlaemynck (BEL) | Belgium B | s.t. |

General classification after stage 9

| Rank | Rider | Team | Time |
|---|---|---|---|
| 1 | René Vietto (FRA) | France – South-East | |
| 2 | Sylvère Maes (BEL) | Belgium | + 2' 57" |
| 3 | Lucien Vlaemynck (BEL) | Belgium B | + 6' 15" |
| 4 | | | |
| 5 | | | |
| 6 | | | |
| 7 | | | |
| 8 | | | |
| 9 | | | |
| 10 | | | |

== Stage 10a ==
21 July 1939 — Toulouse to Narbonne, 148.5 km (92.3 mi)

Stage 10a result

| Rank | Rider | Team | Time |
|---|---|---|---|
| 1 | Pierre Jaminet (FRA) | France | 4h 07' 35" |
| 2 | Antoon van Schendel (NED) | Netherlands | + 49" |
| 3 | Oreste Bernardoni (FRA) | France – South-East | s.t. |
| 4 | Amédée Fournier (FRA) | France – North-East/Île de France | + 59" |
| 5 | René Le Grevès (FRA) | France – West | s.t. |
| 6 | Jean Fontenay (FRA) | France – West | s.t. |
| 7 | Sylvain Marcaillou (FRA) | France | + 1' 31" |
| =8 | Sylvère Maes (BEL) | Belgium | s.t. |
| =8 | Edward Vissers (BEL) | Belgium | s.t. |
| =8 | Marcel Kint (BEL) | Belgium | s.t. |

General classification after stage 10a

| Rank | Rider | Team | Time |
|---|---|---|---|
| 1 | René Vietto (FRA) | France – South-East | |
| 2 | Sylvère Maes (BEL) | Belgium | + 2' 57" |
| 3 | Lucien Vlaemynck (BEL) | Belgium B | + 6' 15" |
| 4 | | | |
| 5 | | | |
| 6 | | | |
| 7 | | | |
| 8 | | | |
| 9 | | | |
| 10 | | | |

== Stage 10b ==
21 July 1939 — Narbonne to Béziers, 27 km (17 mi) (ITT)

Stage 10b result

| Rank | Rider | Team | Time |
|---|---|---|---|
| 1 | Maurice Archambaud (FRA) | France – North-East/Île de France | 37' 30" |
| 2 | Pierre Jaminet (FRA) | France | + 38" |
| 3 | Edward Vissers (BEL) | Belgium | + 1' 20" |
| 4 | Lucien Vlaemynck (BEL) | Belgium B | + 1' 24" |
| 5 | Jan Lambrichs (NED) | Netherlands | + 1' 25" |
| 6 | Oreste Bernardoni (FRA) | France – South-East | + 1' 27" |
| 7 | Albert Ritserveldt (BEL) | Belgium B | + 1' 30" |
| 8 | René Vietto (FRA) | France – South-East | + 1' 33" |
| 9 | François Neuville (BEL) | Belgium | + 1' 50" |
| 10 | Sylvère Maes (BEL) | Belgium | + 1' 55" |

General classification after stage 10b

| Rank | Rider | Team | Time |
|---|---|---|---|
| 1 | René Vietto (FRA) | France – South-East | |
| 2 | Sylvère Maes (BEL) | Belgium | + 3' 19" |
| 3 | Lucien Vlaemynck (BEL) | Belgium B | + 6' 06" |
| 4 | | | |
| 5 | | | |
| 6 | | | |
| 7 | | | |
| 8 | | | |
| 9 | | | |
| 10 | | | |

== Stage 10c ==
21 July 1939 — Béziers to Montpellier, 70.5 km (43.8 mi)

Stage 10c result

| Rank | Rider | Team | Time |
|---|---|---|---|
| 1 | Maurice Archambaud (FRA) | France – North-East/Île de France | 1h 50' 09" |
| 2 | Albert Hendrickx (BEL) | Belgium | + 52" |
| 3 | Pierre Jaminet (FRA) | France | s.t. |
| 4 | François Neuville (BEL) | Belgium | s.t. |
| =5 | Sylvère Maes (BEL) | Belgium | s.t. |
| =5 | Eloi Tassin (FRA) | France – West | s.t. |
| =5 | Raymond Passat (FRA) | France – South-West | s.t. |
| =5 | Sylvain Marcaillou (FRA) | France | s.t. |
| =5 | Pierre Clemens (LUX) | Luxembourg | s.t. |
| =5 | Mathias Clemens (LUX) | Luxembourg | s.t. |

General classification after stage 10c

| Rank | Rider | Team | Time |
|---|---|---|---|
| 1 | René Vietto (FRA) | France – South-East | |
| 2 | Sylvère Maes (BEL) | Belgium | + 3' 19" |
| 3 | Lucien Vlaemynck (BEL) | Belgium B | + 6' 06" |
| 4 | | | |
| 5 | | | |
| 6 | | | |
| 7 | | | |
| 8 | | | |
| 9 | | | |
| 10 | | | |
