= 1939 Tour de France, Stage 11 to Stage 18b =

Cycling race stages

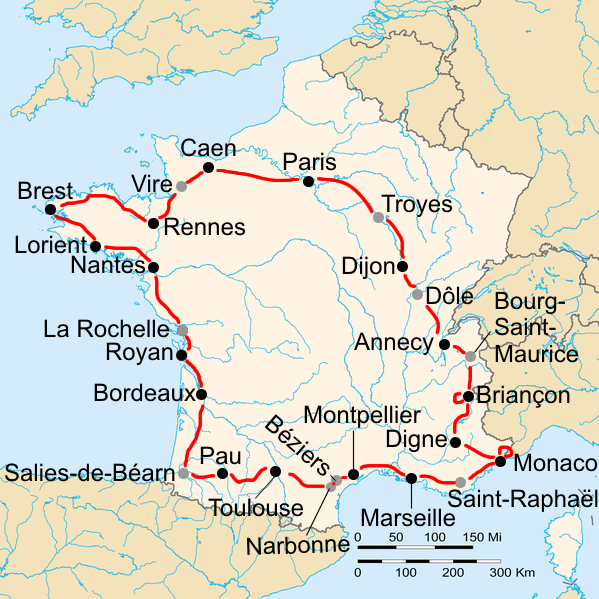
Route of the 1939 Tour de France

The 1939 Tour de France was the 33rd edition of Tour de France, one of cycling's Grand Tours. The Tour began in Paris with a flat stage on 10 July, and Stage 11 occurred on 22 July with a flat stage from Montpellier. The race finished in Paris on 30 July.

== Stage 11 ==
22 July 1939 — Montpellier to Marseille, 212 km (132 mi)

Stage 11 result

Rank	Rider	Team	Time
1	Fabien Galateau (FRA)	France – South-East	6h 30' 55"
2	Pierre Clemens (LUX)	Luxembourg	s.t.
3	René Le Grevès (FRA)	France – West	+ 1' 00"
4	Louis Thiétard (FRA)	France – North-East/Île de France	s.t.
5	Oreste Bernardoni (FRA)	France – South-East	s.t.
6	Pierre Jaminet (FRA)	France	s.t.
7	Jean Fréchaut (FRA)	France – South-West	s.t.
8	Raymond Passat (FRA)	France – South-West	s.t.
=9	Sylvère Maes (BEL)	Belgium	s.t.
=9	Edward Vissers (BEL)	Belgium	s.t.

General classification after stage 11

Rank	Rider	Team	Time
1	René Vietto (FRA)	France – South-East	
2	Sylvère Maes (BEL)	Belgium	+ 3' 19"
3	Lucien Vlaemynck (BEL)	Belgium B	+ 6' 06"
4			
5			
6			
7			
8			
9			
10			

== Stage 12a ==
23 July 1939 — Marseille to Saint-Raphaël, 157 km (98 mi)

Stage 12a result

Rank	Rider	Team	Time
1	François Neuens (LUX)	Luxembourg	5h 11' 15"
2	Pierre Jaminet (FRA)	France	s.t.
3	Maurice Archambaud (FRA)	France – North-East/Île de France	+ 13"
4	François Neuville (BEL)	Belgium	+ 39"
5	Antoon van Schendel (NED)	Netherlands	+ 41"
6	Amédée Fournier (FRA)	France – North-East/Île de France	+ 1' 01"
7	Jean Fréchaut (FRA)	France – South-West	s.t.
8	Oreste Bernardoni (FRA)	France – South-East	s.t.
9	Auguste Mallet (FRA)	France	s.t.
10	Sylvère Maes (BEL)	Belgium	s.t.

General classification after stage 12a

Rank	Rider	Team	Time
1	René Vietto (FRA)	France – South-East	
2	Sylvère Maes (BEL)	Belgium	+ 3' 19"
3	Lucien Vlaemynck (BEL)	Belgium B	+ 6' 06"
4			
5			
6			
7			
8			
9			
10			

== Stage 12b ==
23 July 1939 — Saint-Raphaël to Monaco, 121.5 km (75.5 mi)

Stage 12b result

Rank	Rider	Team	Time
1	Maurice Archambaud (FRA)	France – North-East/Île de France	3h 34' 20"
2	Sylvère Maes (BEL)	Belgium	s.t.
3	Pierre Gallien (FRA)	France – North-East/Île de France	+ 1' 30"
4	Louis Thiétard (FRA)	France – North-East/Île de France	s.t.
5	Pierre Jaminet (FRA)	France	s.t.
6	René Vietto (FRA)	France – South-East	s.t.
7	Albert van Schendel (NED)	Netherlands	s.t.
=8	Edward Vissers (BEL)	Belgium	s.t.
=8	Marcel Kint (BEL)	Belgium	s.t.
=8	André de Korver (NED)	Netherlands	s.t.

General classification after stage 12b

Rank	Rider	Team	Time
1	René Vietto (FRA)	France – South-East	
2	Sylvère Maes (BEL)	Belgium	+ 1' 49"
3	Lucien Vlaemynck (BEL)	Belgium B	+ 6' 59"
4			
5			
6			
7			
8			
9			
10			

== Stage 13 ==
24 July 1939 — Monaco to Monaco, 101.5 km (63.1 mi)

Stage 13 result

Rank	Rider	Team	Time
1	Pierre Gallien (FRA)	France – North-East/Île de France	3h 17' 56"
2	Edmond Pagès (FRA)	France – South-West	+ 1' 05"
3	Albert Hendrickx (BEL)	Belgium	+ 1' 21"
4	Eloi Tassin (FRA)	France – West	s.t.
5	Mathias Clemens (LUX)	Luxembourg	s.t.
6	Dante Gianello (FRA)	France	s.t.
7	Raymond Passat (FRA)	France – South-West	+ 1' 44"
8	Victor Cosson (FRA)	France	s.t.
9	Pierre Jaminet (FRA)	France	+ 1' 52"
10	Albert Ritserveldt (BEL)	Belgium B	s.t.

General classification after stage 13

Rank	Rider	Team	Time
1	René Vietto (FRA)	France – South-East	
2	Sylvère Maes (BEL)	Belgium	+ 1' 49"
3	Lucien Vlaemynck (BEL)	Belgium B	+ 8' 02"
4			
5			
6			
7			
8			
9			
10			

== Stage 14 ==
25 July 1939 — Monaco to Digne, 175 km (109 mi)

Stage 14 result

Rank	Rider	Team	Time
1	Pierre Cloarec (FRA)	France – West	6h 15' 58"
2	Raymond Passat (FRA)	France – South-West	s.t.
3	Joseph Aureille (FRA)	France – South-East	s.t.
4	Victor Cosson (FRA)	France	s.t.
5	Trino Yelamos (FRA)	France – South-East	s.t.
6	René Le Grevès (FRA)	France – West	+ 7' 16"
7	Pierre Jaminet (FRA)	France	s.t.
8	François Neuville (BEL)	Belgium	s.t.
9	André de Korver (NED)	Netherlands	s.t.
10	Dante Gianello (FRA)	France	s.t.

General classification after stage 14

Rank	Rider	Team	Time
1	René Vietto (FRA)	France – South-East	
2	Sylvère Maes (BEL)	Belgium	+ 1' 49"
3	Lucien Vlaemynck (BEL)	Belgium B	+ 8' 02"
4			
5			
6			
7			
8			
9			
10			

== Stage 15 ==
26 July 1939 — Digne to Briançon, 219 km (136 mi)

Stage 15 result

Rank	Rider	Team	Time
1	Sylvère Maes (BEL)	Belgium	8h 24' 20"
2	Pierre Gallien (FRA)	France – North-East/Île de France	+ 3' 23"
3	Dante Gianello (FRA)	France	+ 6' 26"
4	Pierre Clemens (LUX)	Luxembourg	+ 8' 37"
5	Edward Vissers (BEL)	Belgium	+ 12' 05"
6	Mathias Clemens (LUX)	Luxembourg	s.t.
7	Auguste Mallet (FRA)	France	+ 12' 16"
8	Cyriel Vanoverberghe (BEL)	Belgium B	+ 12' 45"
9	Louis Thiétard (FRA)	France – North-East/Île de France	+ 13' 53"
10	François Neuville (BEL)	Belgium	+ 15' 17"

General classification after stage 15

Rank	Rider	Team	Time
1	Sylvère Maes (BEL)	Belgium	
2	René Vietto (FRA)	France – South-East	
3	Lucien Vlaemynck (BEL)	Belgium B	+ 21' 31"
4			
5			
6			
7			
8			
9			
10			

== Stage 16a ==
27 July 1939 — Briançon to Briançon, 126 km (78 mi)

Stage 16a result

Rank	Rider	Team	Time
1	Pierre Jaminet (FRA)	France	5h 04' 39"
2	Mathias Clemens (LUX)	Luxembourg	s.t.
3	Edmond Pagès (FRA)	France – South-West	+ 2' 41"
4	Albertin Disseaux (BEL)	Belgium B	+ 2' 43"
5	Albert van Schendel (NED)	Netherlands	+ 6' 31"
6	Sylvain Marcaillou (FRA)	France	s.t.
7	Dante Gianello (FRA)	France	s.t.
8	Raymond Passat (FRA)	France – South-West	s.t.
=9	Sylvère Maes (BEL)	Belgium	s.t.
=9	Albert Ritserveldt (BEL)	Belgium B	s.t.

General classification after stage 16a

Rank	Rider	Team	Time
1	Sylvère Maes (BEL)	Belgium	
2	René Vietto (FRA)	France – South-East	+ 17' 12"
3	Lucien Vlaemynck (BEL)	Belgium B	+ 27' 13"
4			
5			
6			
7			
8			
9			
10			

== Stage 16b ==
27 July 1939 — Bonneval to Bourg-Saint-Maurice, 64.5 km (40.1 mi) (ITT)

Stage 16b result

Rank	Rider	Team	Time
1	Sylvère Maes (BEL)	Belgium	1h 55' 41"
2	Edward Vissers (BEL)	Belgium	+ 4' 03"
3	Pierre Gallien (FRA)	France – North-East/Île de France	+ 4' 10"
4	Albert Perikel (BEL)	Belgium B	+ 4' 44"
5	Mathias Clemens (LUX)	Luxembourg	+ 5' 11"
6	Albert Ritserveldt (BEL)	Belgium B	+ 7' 09"
7	Christophe Didier (LUX)	Luxembourg	+ 7' 24"
8	Dante Gianello (FRA)	France	+ 7' 31"
9	Lucien Vlaemynck (BEL)	Belgium B	+ 7' 46"
10	Sylvain Marcaillou (FRA)	France	+ 8' 01"

General classification after stage 16b

Rank	Rider	Team	Time
1	Sylvère Maes (BEL)	Belgium	
2	René Vietto (FRA)	France – South-East	+ 27' 00"
3	Lucien Vlaemynck (BEL)	Belgium B	+ 31' 16"
4			
5			
6			
7			
8			
9			
10			

== Stage 16c ==
27 July 1939 — Bourg-Saint-Maurice to Annecy, 103.5 km (64.3 mi)

Stage 16c result

Rank	Rider	Team	Time
1	Antoon van Schendel (NED)	Netherlands	3h 44' 17"
2	Pierre Clemens (LUX)	Luxembourg	s.t.
3	Raymond Passat (FRA)	France – South-West	+ 1' 01"
4	Oreste Bernardoni (FRA)	France – South-East	s.t.
5	Pierre Jaminet (FRA)	France	s.t.
6	Albert Perikel (BEL)	Belgium B	s.t.
7	Auguste Mallet (FRA)	France	s.t.
8	Janus Hellemons (NED)	Netherlands	+ 1' 42"
9	Joseph Aureille (FRA)	France – South-East	+ 2' 03"
10	Jean Fontenay (FRA)	France – West	+ 2' 05"

General classification after stage 16c

Rank	Rider	Team	Time
1	Sylvère Maes (BEL)	Belgium	
2	René Vietto (FRA)	France – South-East	+ 27' 00"
3	Lucien Vlaemynck (BEL)	Belgium B	+ 31' 16"
4			
5			
6			
7			
8			
9			
10			

== Stage 17a ==
29 July 1939 — Annecy to Dôle, 226 km (140 mi)

Stage 17a result

Rank	Rider	Team	Time
1	François Neuens (LUX)	Luxembourg	7h 17' 58"
2	Antoon van Schendel (NED)	Netherlands	s.t.
3	René Le Grevès (FRA)	France – West	+ 25"
4	Louis Thiétard (FRA)	France – North-East/Île de France	s.t.
5	Pierre Jaminet (FRA)	France	s.t.
6	Mathias Clemens (LUX)	Luxembourg	s.t.
7	Oreste Bernardoni (FRA)	France – South-East	s.t.
8	André de Korver (NED)	Netherlands	s.t.
=9	Sylvère Maes (BEL)	Belgium	s.t.
=9	Edward Vissers (BEL)	Belgium	s.t.

General classification after stage 17a

Rank	Rider	Team	Time
1	Sylvère Maes (BEL)	Belgium	
2	René Vietto (FRA)	France – South-East	+ 26' 45"
3	Lucien Vlaemynck (BEL)	Belgium B	+ 31' 01"
4			
5			
6			
7			
8			
9			
10			

== Stage 17b ==
29 July 1939 — Dôle to Dijon, 59 km (37 mi) (ITT)
In a burning heat, the best riders of the previous stages also performed well in the time trial. Winner was the world hour recordholder Archambaud.

Stage 17b result

Rank	Rider	Team	Time
1	Maurice Archambaud (FRA)	France – North-East/Île de France	1h 24' 28"
2	Cyriel Vanoverberghe (BEL)	Belgium B	+ 51"
3	Lucien Vlaemynck (BEL)	Belgium B	+ 1' 19"
4	Jan Lambrichs (NED)	Netherlands	+ 1' 38"
5	Edward Vissers (BEL)	Belgium	+ 1' 41"
6	Sylvère Maes (BEL)	Belgium	+ 2' 17"
7	Mathias Clemens (LUX)	Luxembourg	+ 2' 40"
8	Raymond Passat (FRA)	France – South-West	+ 2' 52"
9	Auguste Mallet (FRA)	France	+ 3' 24"
10	Pierre Jaminet (FRA)	France	+ 3' 27"

General classification after stage 17b

Rank	Rider	Team	Time
1	Sylvère Maes (BEL)	Belgium	120h 30m 18s
2	René Vietto (FRA)	France – South-East	+ 28' 33"
3	Lucien Vlaemynck (BEL)	Belgium B	+ 30' 03"
4	Mathias Clemens (LUX)	Luxembourg	+ 34' 04"
5	Edward Vissers (BEL)	Belgium	+ 36' 00"
6	Sylvain Marcaillou (FRA)	France	+ 40' 11"
7	Albertin Disseaux (BEL)	Belgium B	+ 44' 49"
8	Jan Lambrichs (NED)	Netherlands	+ 45' 56"
9	Albert Ritserveldt (BEL)	Belgium B	+ 46' 22"
10	Cyriel Vanoverberghe (BEL)	Belgium B	+ 48' 31"

== Stage 18a ==
30 July 1939 — Dijon to Troyes, 151 km (94 mi)

Stage 18a result

Rank	Rider	Team	Time
1	René Le Grevès (FRA)	France – West	5h 02' 10"
2	Amédée Fournier (FRA)	France – North-East/Île de France	s.t.
3	François Neuville (BEL)	Belgium	s.t.
4	Joseph Soffietti (FRA)	France – South-East	s.t.
5	Raymond Passat (FRA)	France – South-West	s.t.
6	Pierre Jaminet (FRA)	France	s.t.
=7	Sylvère Maes (BEL)	Belgium	s.t.
=7	Edward Vissers (BEL)	Belgium	s.t.
=7	Marcel Kint (BEL)	Belgium	s.t.
=7	Albert Hendrickx (BEL)	Belgium	s.t.

General classification after stage 18a

Rank	Rider	Team	Time
1	Sylvère Maes (BEL)	Belgium	
2	René Vietto (FRA)	France – South-East	+ 28' 33"
3	Lucien Vlaemynck (BEL)	Belgium B	+ 30' 03"
4			
5			
6			
7			
8			
9			
10			

== Stage 18b ==
30 July 1939 — Troyes to Paris, 201 km (125 mi)

Stage 18b result

Rank	Rider	Team	Time
1	Marcel Kint (BEL)	Belgium	6h 30' 49"
2	Sylvère Maes (BEL)	Belgium	s.t.
3	Maurice Archambaud (FRA)	France – North-East/Île de France	s.t.
4	Cyriel Vanoverberghe (BEL)	Belgium B	+ 1' 13"
5	Pierre Cloarec (FRA)	France – West	s.t.
6	Fabien Galateau (FRA)	France – South-East	s.t.
7	Pierre Clemens (LUX)	Luxembourg	s.t.
8	Auguste Mallet (FRA)	France	s.t.
9	René Le Grevès (FRA)	France – West	+ 2' 05"
10	Raymond Passat (FRA)	France – South-West	s.t.

General classification after stage 18b

Rank	Rider	Team	Time
1	Sylvère Maes (BEL)	Belgium	132h 03' 17"
2	René Vietto (FRA)	France – South-East	+ 30' 38"
3	Lucien Vlaemynck (BEL)	Belgium B	+ 32' 08"
4	Mathias Clemens (LUX)	Luxembourg	+ 36' 09"
5	Edward Vissers (BEL)	Belgium	+ 38' 05"
6	Sylvain Marcaillou (FRA)	France	+ 45' 16"
7	Albertin Disseaux (BEL)	Belgium B	+ 46' 54"
8	Jan Lambrichs (NED)	Netherlands	+ 48' 01"
9	Albert Ritserveldt (BEL)	Belgium B	+ 48' 27"
10	Cyriel Vanoverberghe (BEL)	Belgium B	+ 49' 44"
