= Tour de Berne =

Swiss one-day road cycling race

Race details
- Date: May
- Region: Switzerland
- Discipline: Road
- Competition: UCI Europe Tour
- Type: One-day race
- Web site: www.tourdeberne.ch

History
- First edition: 1920
- Editions: 97 (as of 2025)
- First winner: Heiri Suter (SUI)
- Most wins: Heiri Suter (SUI) (5 wins)
- Most recent: Arnaud Tendon (SUI)

History (women)
- First winner: Jolanda Kalt (SUI)
- Most wins: Evelyne Müller (SUI); Luzia Zberg (SUI); (3 wins)
- Most recent: Elise Chabbey (SUI)

Tour de Berne is an elite professional road bicycle racing event held in Bern, Switzerland with races for men and women.

== Men's event ==
The men's event began in 1920 and has previously been a UCI 1.2 rated event on the UCI Europe Tour.

Year	Winner	Second	Third
1920	(Switzerland) Heiri Suter	(Switzerland) Hermann Gehrig	(Switzerland) Charles Martinet
1921	(Switzerland) Heiri Suter	(Switzerland) Max Suter	(Switzerland) Jean Martinet
1922	(Switzerland) Heiri Suter	(Belgium) Jean-Baptiste Mosselmans	(France) Lucien Rich
1923	(Switzerland) Heiri Suter	(Switzerland) Henry Reymond	(Switzerland) Kastor Notter
1924	(Switzerland) Charles Guyot	(Switzerland) Henry Reymond	(Switzerland) Max Suter
1925	(Switzerland) Kastor Notter	(Switzerland) Heiri Suter	(Switzerland) Kaspar Schneider
1926	(Switzerland) Albert Blattmann	(Switzerland) Alfred Saccomani	(Switzerland) Otto Lehner
1927	(Switzerland) Hans Kaspar	(Switzerland) Otto Lehner	(Switzerland) Kaspar Schneider
1928	(Switzerland) Georges Antenen	(Switzerland) Albert Meyer	(Switzerland) Eugen Schlegel
1929	(Switzerland) Heiri Suter	(Germany) Ludwig Geyer	(Switzerland) Albert Meyer
1930	(Switzerland) Georges Antenen	(Switzerland) Heiri Suter	(Switzerland) Alfred Rüegg
1931	(Switzerland) Ernst Meier	(Switzerland) Ernst Hofer	(Switzerland) Alfred Bula
1932	(Germany) Hermann Müller	(Switzerland) Turel Wanzenfried	(Switzerland) Georges Antenen
1933	(Switzerland) Georges Antenen	(Switzerland) Albert Büchi	(Switzerland) Alfred Büchi
1934	(Switzerland) Walter Blattmann	(Switzerland) Alfred Bula	(Switzerland) Fritz Muller
1935	(Switzerland) Alfred Bula	(Italy) Carlo Romanatti	(Switzerland) Hans Martin
1936	(Switzerland) Theo Heimann	(Switzerland) Werner Buchwalder	(Germany) Karl Steger
1937	(Switzerland) Karl Wyss	(Switzerland) Hans Martin	(Switzerland) Ernst Nievergelt
1938	(Switzerland) Karl Litschi	(Switzerland) Robert Zimmermann	(Switzerland) Walter Blatmann
1939	(Switzerland) Theo Perret	(Switzerland) Hans Martin	(Switzerland) Edgar Buchwalder
1941	(Switzerland) Paul Egli	(Switzerland) Hans Maag	(Switzerland) Ferdi Kübler
1942	(Switzerland) Edgar Buchwalder	(Switzerland) Hans Knecht	(Switzerland) Werner Jaisli
1943	(Switzerland) Ferdi Kübler	(Switzerland) Walter Diggelmann	(Switzerland) André Hardegger
1945	(Switzerland) Hans Maag	(Switzerland) Ferdi Kübler	(Switzerland) Walter Diggelmann
1946	(Italy) Osvaldo Bailo	(Switzerland) Hans Knecht	(Switzerland) Willy Kern
1947	(Switzerland) Hans Knecht	(Switzerland) Leo Weilenmann	(Switzerland) Oscar Plattner
1948	(Switzerland) Ernst Stettler	(Switzerland) Roger Aeschlimann	(Switzerland) Hans Knecht
1949	(Switzerland) Ferdi Kübler	(Switzerland) Gottfried Weilenmann	(Switzerland) Leo Weilenmann
1950	(Switzerland) Oscar Plattner	(Switzerland) Ernst Stettler	(Switzerland) Emilio Croci-Torti
1951	(Switzerland) Cesare Zuretti	(Switzerland) Walter Reiser	(Switzerland) Fritz Schär
1952	(Switzerland) Hans Sommer	(Switzerland) Hans Notzli	(Switzerland) Robert Bintz
1953	(Switzerland) Remo Pianezzi	(Switzerland) Fritz Schär	(Switzerland) Fritz Zbinden
1954	(Switzerland) Fritz Schär	(Switzerland) Ferdi Kübler	(Switzerland) Max Schellenberg
1955	(Switzerland) Hans Hollenstein	(Switzerland) Ernst Rudolf	(Switzerland) Eugen Kamber
1956	(Switzerland) Fausto Lurati	(Switzerland) Jean-Claude Grèt	(Switzerland) Attilio Moresi
1957	(Belgium) Germain Derycke	(Switzerland) Ernst Traxel	(Switzerland) René Minder
1958	(West Germany) Heinz Müller	(Switzerland) Giuseppe Barale	(Switzerland) Kurt Gimmi
1959	(Switzerland) Hans Hollenstein	(Switzerland) Toni Graeser	(Switzerland) Walter Favre
1960	(Switzerland) René Strehler	(Switzerland) Alfred Rüegg	(Switzerland) Attilio Moresi
1961	(Switzerland) Alfred Rüegg	(France) Raymond Reisser	(France) Gilbert Salvador
1962	(Switzerland) Rolf Graf	(Switzerland) Rolf Maurer	(Belgium) Robert Lelangue
1963	(Switzerland) Rudolf Hauser	(Switzerland) Fredy Dubach	(Switzerland) Rolf Maurer
1964	(Belgium) Joseph Hoevenaers	(Switzerland) René Binggeli	(Switzerland) Kurt Gimmi
1965	(Belgium) Robert Lelangue	(Italy) Luciano Sambi	(Italy) Giancarlo Ferretti
1966	(East Germany) Horst Oldenburg	(Italy) Danilo Ferrari	(Italy) Renato Bongiorni
1967	(Switzerland) Peter Abt	(West Germany) Hans Junkermann	(Switzerland) Auguste Girard
1968	(United Kingdom) Peter Hill	(West Germany) Peter Glemser	(France) Jacques Cadiou; (France) Fernand Etter; (Switzerland) Willy Spühler
1969	(Switzerland) Louis Pfenninger	(Switzerland) Peter Abt	(West Germany) Herbert Wilde
1970	(Netherlands) Leo Duyndam	(West Germany) Winfried Bölke	(Netherlands) Arie den Hartog
1971	(Switzerland) Erich Spahn	(Belgium) Maurice Dury	(Belgium) Willy De Geest
1972	(Switzerland) Erich Spahn	(Netherlands) Harrie Jansen	(West Germany) Jürgen Tschan
1974	(Switzerland) Roland Salm	(Switzerland) Fr. Van Beeck	(Switzerland) St. Marti
1975	(Switzerland) Roland Salm	(Belgium) Marc Meernhout	(Italy) Gianni Di Lorenzo
1976	(Switzerland) René Savary	(Belgium) Geert Malfait	(Switzerland) Roland Salm
1977	(Italy) Simone Fraccaro	(Italy) Giuseppe Saronni	(Italy) Giovanni Battaglin
1978	(Belgium) Eddy Verstraeten	(Switzerland) Bruno Wolfer	(Switzerland) Gody Schmutz
1979	(Switzerland) Gody Schmutz	(Italy) Ennio Vanotti	(Switzerland) Erwin Lienhard
1980	(Belgium) Rudy Colman	(Italy) Serge Parsani	(Italy) Mario Beccia
1981	(Belgium) Rudy Pevenage	(Belgium) Yvan Lamote	(Liechtenstein) Sigmund Hermann
1982	(Switzerland) Erich Mächler	(Switzerland) Gilbert Glaus	(New Zealand) Erik McKenzie
1984	(Republic of Ireland) Sean Kelly	(France) Philippe Leleu	(Belgium) Claude Criquielion
1985	(Switzerland) Urs Freuler	(Netherlands) Hans Daams	(Switzerland) Jürg Bruggmann
1986	(Switzerland) Stephan Joho	(Switzerland) Jürg Bruggmann	(Denmark) Kim Andersen
1987	(France) Philippe Chevallier	(Switzerland) Thomas Wegmüller	(Switzerland) Richard Trinkler
1988	(Switzerland) Urs Freuler	(Australia) Michael Wilson	(Belgium) Jean-Philippe Vandenbrande
1989	(Switzerland) Mauro Gianetti	(Switzerland) Thomas Wegmüller	(Switzerland) Niki Rüttimann
1990	(Switzerland) Thomas Wegmüller	(Switzerland) Rolf Järmann	(Netherlands) Frank van den Abbeele
1991	(Belgium) Serge Baguet	(Belgium) Benny Van Brabant	(Russia) Andrej Čmil
1992	(Switzerland) Erich Mächler	(Switzerland) Fabian Jeker	(Switzerland) Laurent Dufaux
1993	(Germany) Erik Zabel	(France) Éric Caritoux	(Belgium) Jan Nevens
1994	(Germany) Andreas Kappes	(Switzerland) Pascal Richard	(Belgium) Frank Vandenbroucke
1995	(Italy) Luca Scinto	(Switzerland) Pascal Richard	(Sweden) Michel Lafis
1996	(Switzerland) Beat Zberg	(Switzerland) Felice Puttini	(Italy) Michele Coppolillo
1997	(Sweden) Michael Andersson	(Germany) Christian Henn	(Italy) Giuseppe Di Grande
1998	(Switzerland) Markus Zberg	(Switzerland) Oscar Camenzind	(Italy) Simone Leporatti
1999	(Italy) Andrea Ferrigato	(Switzerland) Niki Aebersold	(Switzerland) Oscar Camenzind
2000	(Switzerland) Lukas Zumsteg	(Switzerland) Marcel Strauss	(Switzerland) Christian Weber
2001	(Germany) Danilo Hondo	(Switzerland) Roman Peter	(Switzerland) Uwe Straumann
2002	(Luxembourg) Kim Kirchen	(Switzerland) Mauro Gianetti	(France) Laurent Paumier
2003	No race		
2004	(Belarus) Alexandre Usov	(Switzerland) Roman Peter	(Switzerland) Sascha Urweider
2005	(Germany) René Weissinger	(Italy) Giampaolo Cheula	(Switzerland) Alexandre Moos
2006–2007	No race		
2008	(Poland) Jarosław Marycz	(France) Guillaume Bonnafond	(Switzerland) Arnaud Godet
2009	(Switzerland) Michael Baer	(Switzerland) René Murpf	(Switzerland) Bernhard Oberholzer
2010	(Hong Kong) Choi Ki Ho	(Eritrea) Daniel Teklehaimanot	(Switzerland) Roger Beuchat
2011	(Switzerland) Pirmin Lang	(Eritrea) Natnael Berhane	(Italy) Mirco Saggiorato
2012	(Switzerland) Silvan Dillier	(Switzerland) Marcel Aregger	(France) Édouard Lauber
2013	(Switzerland) Marcel Wyss	(Switzerland) Sébastien Reichenbach	(France) Rémi Cusin
2014	(Austria) Matthias Brändle	(Switzerland) Simon Zahner	(Switzerland) Pirmin Lang
2015	(Switzerland) Tom Bohli	(Italy) Antonio Parrinello	(Italy) Andrea Pasqualon
2016	(Italy) Enrico Salvador	(Italy) Danilo Celano	(France) Edouard Lauber
2017	(Italy) Filippo Fortin	(Netherlands) Bram Welten	(Switzerland) Fabian Lienhard
2018	No race		
2019	(Switzerland) Stefan Bissegger	(Eritrea) Henok Mulubrhan	(Switzerland) Fabian Lienhard
2020–2021	No race due to the COVID-19 pandemic in Switzerland		
2022	(Switzerland) Simon Vitzthum	(Switzerland) Lukas Rüegg	(France) Brieuc Rolland
2023	(Switzerland) Arnaud Tendon	(Switzerland) Marcel Wyss	(Switzerland) Lukas Rüegg
2024	(Switzerland) Diego Casagrande	(Switzerland) Christoph Janssen	(Switzerland) Luca Jenni
2025	(Switzerland) Arnaud Tendon	(Italy) Alexander Konychev	(Switzerland) Marcel Wyss

== Women's event ==
The women's Tour de Berne is an elite professional event and since 2005 has been elevated to the UCI Women's Road Cycling World Cup. The race is six laps of a 20.8 km (12.9 mi) city circuit for 124.8 km (77.5 mi) total distance.

=== Past winners ===
Year	Country	Rider	Team
2001	Germany	Vera Hohlfeld	Acca Due O Pasta
2002	Switzerland	Priska Doppmann	Mazza Cipret-Schweiz Rot Comp
2003	Australia	Olivia Gollan	Australian National Team
2004	Italy	Fabiana Luperini	Team Let's Go Finland
2005	Lithuania	Edita Pučinskaitė	Nobili Rubinetterie – Menikini Cogeas
2006	Kazakhstan	Zulfiya Zabirova	Team Bigla
2007	Lithuania	Edita Pučinskaitė	Equipe Nürnberger Versicherung
2008	Sweden	Susanne Ljungskog	
2009	United States	Kristin Armstrong	
2010	Great Britain	Sharon Laws	
