= 1938 Paris–Nice =

Race details
- Dates: 23–27 March 1938
- Stages: 5
- Distance: 1,130 km (702.1 mi)
- Winning time: 30h 45' 20"

Results
| | Winner | Jules Lowie (BEL) |
| | Second | Albertin Disseaux (BEL) |
| | Third | Antoon van Schendel (NED) |

The 1938 Paris–Nice was the sixth edition of the Paris–Nice cycle race and was held from 23 March to 27 March 1938. The race started in Paris and finished in Nice. The race was won by Jules Lowie.

== General classification ==
Final general classification

| Rank | Rider | Time |
|---|---|---|
| 1 | Jules Lowie (BEL) | 30h 45' 20" |
| 2 | Albertin Disseaux (BEL) | + 54" |
| 3 | Antoon van Schendel (NED) | + 1' 47" |
| 4 | Pierre Jaminet (FRA) | + 2' 22" |
| 5 | Georges Christiaens (BEL) | + 2' 31" |
| 6 | Gaston Rebry (BEL) | + 2' 31" |
| 7 | Julián Berrendero (ESP) | + 5' 09" |
| 8 | Raymond Louviot (FRA) | + 6' 35" |
| 9 | Joseph Magnani (USA) | + 6' 52" |
| 10 | Karl Litschi (SUI) | + 7' 02" |
