= Trino (disambiguation) =

Trino, Piedmont is a commune in Italy.

Trino may also refer to:

== People ==
- Trino Yelamos (1915–1989), French racing cyclist
- Trino Arizcorreta (1902–?), Spanish football player
- Trino Cruz (born 1960), Gibraltarian poet

== Technology ==
- Trino (SQL query engine), a fork of the Presto database query engine
