= Werner Jaisli =

Werner Jaisli may refer to:

- Werner Jaisli (cyclist)
- Werner Jaisli (artist)
