= 1939 La Flèche Wallonne =

Race details
- Dates: 18 June 1939
- Stages: 1
- Distance: 260 km (161.6 mi)
- Winning time: 7h 14' 00"

Results
	Winner	Edmond Delathouwer (BEL)
	Second	Huub Sijen (NED)
	Third	Albert Perikel (BEL)

The 1939 La Flèche Wallonne was the fourth edition of La Flèche Wallonne cycle race and was held on 18 June 1939. The race started in Mons and finished in Rocourt. The race was won by Edmond Delathouwer.

== General classification ==
Final general classification

Rank	Rider	Time
1	Edmond Delathouwer (BEL)	7h 14' 00"
2	Huub Sijen (NED)	+ 55"
3	Albert Perikel (BEL)	+ 55"
4	Albertin Disseaux (BEL)	+ 1' 00"
5	Edgard De Caluwé (BEL)	+ 1' 00"
6	Camiel Michielsens (BEL)	+ 1' 00"
7	Médard Barbe (BEL)	+ 1' 00"
8	Constant Lauwers (BEL)	+ 1' 00"
9	Albert Beirnaert (BEL)	+ 1' 00"
10	Kamiel Beeckman (BEL)	+ 1' 00"
