= Maestranzi =

Maestranzi is a last name. Notable people with this last name include:

- Anthony Maestranzi (born 1984), American-Italian basketball player
- Ettore Maestranzi (1914–1966), Swiss racing cyclist
