= 1940 Volta a Catalunya =

Race details
- Dates: 4–12 May 1940
- Stages: 8
- Distance: 1,344 km (835.1 mi)
- Winning time: 48h 41' 44"

Results
	Winner	Christophe Didier (LUX)
	Second	Mathias Clemens (LUX)
	Third	Mariano Cañardo (ESP)

The 1940 Volta a Catalunya was the 20th edition of the Volta a Catalunya cycle race and was held from 4 May to 12 May 1940. The race started and finished in Barcelona. The race was won by Christophe Didier.

== Route and stages ==
List of stages
Stage	Date	Course	Distance	Winner
1	5 May	Barcelona International Exposition	38 km (24 mi)	Nello Troggi (ITA)
2	5 May	Barcelona to El Vendrell	86 km (53 mi)	Huub Sijen (NED)
3	6 May	El Vendrell to Reus	147 km (91 mi)	Frans Pauwels (NED)
4	7 May	Reus to Lleida (ITT)	111 km (69 mi)	Mathias Clemens (LUX)
5	8 May	Lleida to Vielha e Mijaran	215 km (134 mi)	Christophe Didier (LUX)
6	9 May	Vielha e Mijaran to La Seu d'Urgell	266 km (165 mi)	Karel-Lodewijk van Espenhout (BEL)
7	10 May	La Seu d'Urgell to Figueres	200 km (124 mi)	Albert Ritserveldt (BEL)
8	11 May	Figueres to Girona (ITT)	93 km (58 mi)	Mathias Clemens (LUX)
9	12 May	Girona to Barcelona	188 km (117 mi)	Mathias Clemens (LUX)
	Total		1,344 km (835 mi)	

== General classification ==
Final general classification

Rank	Rider	Time
1	Christophe Didier (LUX)	48h 41' 44"
2	Mathias Clemens (LUX)	+ 4' 26"
3	Mariano Cañardo (ESP)	+ 8' 59"
4	Diego Cháfer (ESP)	+ 14' 04"
5	Juan Gimeno (ESP)	+ 14' 45"
6	Fermín Trueba (ESP)	+ 33' 37"
7	Antonio Andrés Sancho (ESP)	+ 34' 35"
8	Antonio Martin (ESP)	+ 37' 49"
9	Delio Rodríguez (ESP)	+ 39' 03"
10	Manuel Izquierdo (ESP)	+ 54' 40"
