= Lukas Zumsteg =

Swiss bicycle racer (born 1972)

Personal information
- Born: 21 June 1972 (age 54) Sulz, Aargau, Switzerland

Cycling career
- Sport: Cycling
- Current team: Retired
- Discipline: Road
- Role: Rider

Professional teams
- 1998–1999: Team Ericsson–Villiger
- 2000–2002: Phonak

Lukas Zumsteg (born 21 June 1972) is a Swiss former professional road cyclist. He most notably won the Tour de Berne in 2000.

== Major results ==
1999
8th Overall UNIQA Classic
2000
1st Tour de Berne
2001
2nd Josef Voegeli Memorial
8th GP du canton d'Argovie
2002
5th Road race, National Road Championships
