= Walter Gross (cyclist) =

Swiss cyclist

Personal information
- Born: 30 October 1915

Cycling career
- Sport: Cycling
- Discipline: Road
- Role: Rider

Walter Gross was a Swiss racing cyclist. He was born on October 30, 1915 in Hägendorf (Solothurn), Switzerland. He rode in the 1939 Tour de France.
