= François Garcia =

French cyclist

Personal information
- Born: 25 September 1917
- Died: 15 November 2004 (aged 87)

Cycling career
- Sport: Cycling
- Discipline: Road
- Role: Rider

François Garcia (25 September 1917 – 15 November 2004) was a French racing cyclist. He rode in the 1939 Tour de France.
