= Jan Gommers =

Dutch cyclist (1916–2002)

Personal information
- Born: 1 March 1916
- Died: 27 July 2002 (aged 86)

Cycling career
- Sport: Cycling
- Discipline: Road
- Role: Rider

Jan Gommers (1 March 1916 – 27 July 2002) was a Dutch racing cyclist. He rode in the 1939 Tour de France.
