= Joseph Magnani =

American road cyclist (1911–1975)

Personal information
- Born: July 15, 1911 LaSalle, Illinois
- Died: November 30, 1975 (aged 64) Oak Park, Illinois
- Height: 5 ft 11 in (180 cm)

Cycling career
- Sport: Cycling
- Discipline: Road
- Role: Rider

Amateur team
- Club Cyclo-Tourists

Professional teams
- 1935–1938: Urago
- 1939: Terrot–Hutchinson
- 1940: Individual
- 1941–1944: France-Sport–Dunlop
- 1944–1945: Mercier–Hutchinson
- 1945–1946: Ray–Dunlop
- 1946: Olmo–Fulgor
- 1947: Urago–Dunlop
- 1948: Tebag

Joseph Magnani (July 15, 1911 – November 30, 1975) was an American road cyclist, who competed as a professional from 1935 to 1948.

== Early life ==
Joseph Magnani was born in LaSalle, Illinois, to John and Gonda Magnani, who were Italian immigrants. His father was a coal miner. Shortly after his birth, the family moved to Mount Clare, Illinois, where his father continued to work as a miner.

== Career ==
In 1928 at the age of 16, he and his sister Angeline moved to France to live with relatives, where he began to take an interest in cycling competitions. Here he also met his wife Erminia (Mimi) Soria. There he joined a local amateur team. After winning the Grand Prix Urago in 1935, Magnani was offered a contract with a team sponsored by Urago Cycles. His first major win came the same year in the 1935 Marseille–Nice, when he attacked the peloton near the end of the race and held the chasers off to the line. Magnani continued to have success in the next few seasons, having finished 9th overall in the 1938 Paris–Nice, after moving into the top 10 overall due to finishing ahead of the peloton in a breakaway on the penultimate stage. He also gained additional attention in the press for being the only American professional cyclist in Europe, earning him the nickname "L'Américain". However, he never was able to compete in the Tour de France because the race was between national teams at the time.

For the 1939 season, Magnani moved to the Terrot–Hutchinson team, winning several more races including the first stage of the Tour du Sud-Est.

His career was cut short by World War II and his imprisonment in a concentration camp, where he was kept for 18 months, losing over 70 pounds in the process. After his release, he returned to competition and represented the United States at the 1947 UCI Road World Championships in Reims, where he finished seventh and yet was the final finisher due to extremely hot weather, forcing many top names including Fausto Coppi to abandon the race.

Magnani competed in his only Grand Tour at the 1946 Giro d'Italia with Olmo team owned by former professional cyclist Giuseppe Olmo. However, he was forced to abandon the race after suffering a crash. This also made him the first American to compete in the race.

In 1948, he returned to the United States for a family reunion, and decided to return to living there after receiving a contract with the Schwinn Bicycle Company to compete in six-day races.

He died from Parkinson's disease in Oak Park in the suburbs of Chicago on November 30, 1975. He was inducted into the United States Bicycling Hall of Fame in 1998.

== Major results ==
1935
1st Marseille–Nice
1st Grand Prix d'Urago
1936
1st Grand Prix d'Urago
2nd Nice–Annot–Nice
1937
1st Nice–Annot–Nice
1938
1st Grand Prix d'Antibes
1st Marseille–Toulon–Marseille
1st Circuit des cols pyrénéens
2nd Overall Tour de l'Est Central

1st Stages 4 & 5

2nd Nice–Annot–Nice
9th Overall Paris–Nice
1939
1st Lyon–Saint-Étienne–Lyon
1st Stage 1 Tour du Sud-Est
1st Stage 1 Circuit du Provence
1st Stage 2 Circuit des Alpes
1940
1st Grand Prix d'Antibes
1st Grand Prix de la Côte d'Azur
1st Tour de Porto Alegre
1941
1st Stage 1 Circuit du Mont Ventoux
10th Grand Prix des Nations
1942
2nd Circuit de la Haute-Savoie
1946
2nd Grand Prix des Alpes
1947
3rd Tour du Lac Léman
3rd Circuit des cols pyrénéens
7th Road race, UCI Road World Championships
