= Arnaud Tendon =

Swiss cyclist

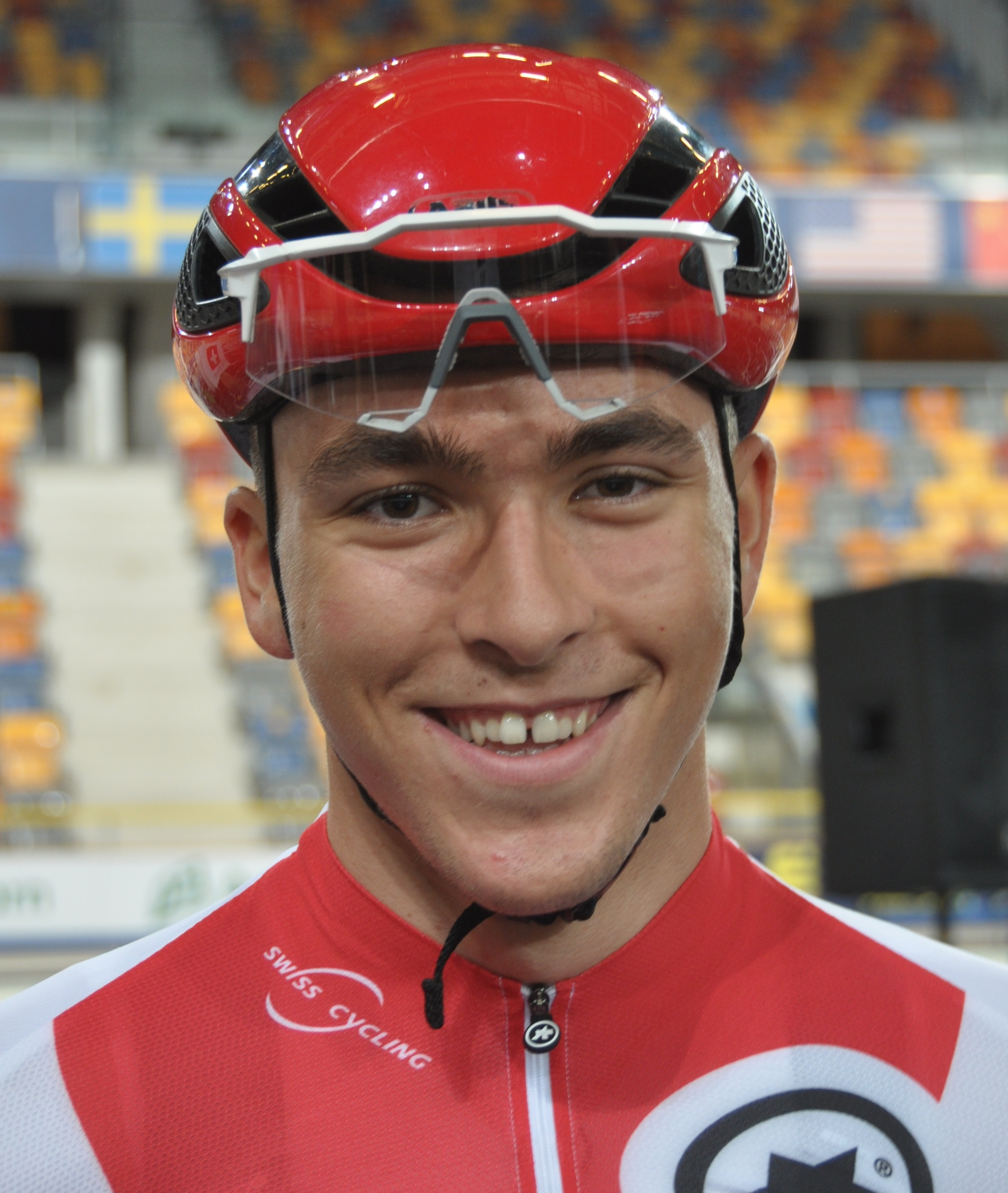
- Tendon in 2021

Personal information
- Born: 6 November 2002 (age 23) Bassecourt, Switzerland
- Height: 1.85 m (6 ft 1 in)

Cycling career
- Sport: Cycling
- Current team: Van Rysel–Roubaix
- Discipline: Road
- Role: Rider

Amateur team
- 2025: Elite Fondations Cycling Team

Professional teams
- 2021–2022: Swiss Racing Academy
- 2023–2024: Tudor Pro Cycling Team U23
- 2026–: Van Rysel–Roubaix

Arnaud Tendon (born 6 November 2002) is a Swiss cyclist, who currently rides for UCI Continental team Van Rysel–Roubaix. He took his first professional victory on stage one of the 2026 Tour de la Provence, winning via a breakaway.

== Major results ==
2019
4th Road race, National Junior Road Championships
2020
National Junior Road Championships

1st Road race
2nd Time trial

8th Overall Grand Prix Rüebliland
10th Road race, UEC European Junior Road Championships
2021
5th Time trial, National Under-23 Road Championships
2022
1st Stage 1 Tour du Pays de Montbéliard
2nd Team relay, UEC European Under-23 Road Championships
National Under-23 Road Championships

2nd Road race
5th Time trial

2023
1st Tour de Berne
5th Road race, National Under-23 Road Championships
2024
1st Road race, National Under-23 Road Championships
1st Tour du Jura
2025
1st Tour de Berne
1st Stage 2 Arden Challenge
1st Stage 1 Tour Nivernais Morvan
4th Road race, National Road Championships
5th Overall Flèche du Sud
7th Tour de la Mirabelle
2026 (1 pro win)
Tour de la Provence

1st Points classification
1st Stage 1
