= Christophe Taëron =

French cyclist

Personal information
- Born: 9 January 1919
- Died: 26 July 1996 (aged 77)

Cycling career
- Sport: Cycling
- Discipline: Road
- Role: Rider

Christophe Taëron (9 January 1919 – 26 July 1996) was a French racing cyclist. He rode in the 1939 Tour de France.
