= Grégoire Leisen =

Luxembourgish cyclist

Personal information
- Born: 15 July 1916 Bettendorf, Luxembourg
- Died: 28 October 1993 (aged 77) Messancy, Belgium

Cycling career
- Sport: Cycling
- Discipline: Road
- Role: Rider

Professional team
- 1939: Alcyon–Dunlop

Grégoire Leisen (15 July 1916 – 28 October 1993) was a Luxembourgish racing cyclist. He rode in the 1939 Tour de France.
