= Gabriel Bouffier =

French cyclist

Personal information
- Born: 2 December 1918
- Died: 2 July 1982 (aged 63)

Cycling career
- Sport: Cycling
- Discipline: Road
- Role: Rider

Gabriel Bouffier (2 December 1918 – 2 July 1982) was a French racing cyclist. He rode in the 1939 Tour de France.
