= Joffre Daran =

French cyclist

Personal information
- Born: 27 December 1914 Pavie, Gers, France
- Died: 27 March 2008 (aged 93)

Cycling career
- Sport: Cycling
- Discipline: Road
- Role: Rider

Joffre Daran (27 December 1914 – 27 March 2008) was a French racing cyclist. He rode in the 1939 Tour de France.

He was born in Pavie.
