= Roger Bailleux =

French cyclist

Personal information
- Born: 3 August 1913
- Died: 13 April 1988 (aged 74)

Cycling career
- Sport: Cycling
- Discipline: Road
- Role: Rider

Roger Bailleux (3 August 1913 – 13 April 1988) was a French racing cyclist. He rode in the 1939 Tour de France.
