= Karl Wyss (cyclist) =

Swiss cyclist

Personal information
- Born: 9 April 1912 Klingnau, Switzerland
- Died: 6 December 2009 (aged 97) Lucerne

Cycling career
- Sport: Cycling
- Discipline: Road
- Role: Rider

Karl Wyss (9 April 1912 – 6 December 2009) was a Swiss racing cyclist. He rode in the 1939 Tour de France.
