= Trino Cruz =

Gibraltarian poet (born 1960)

Trino Cruz Seruya (born 1960) is a Gibraltarian poet.

== Biography ==
Born in Gibraltar in 1960. Of mixed Sephardi, English, Italian and Spanish ancestry, he studied in Liverpool and London before returning to his birthplace in 1983. He has been called a main example of the Spanish-language poetry both in Gibraltar and in the wider scope of the territories circling the Strait of the same name. Commentator of Maghrebian poetry, he has also translated works by authors such as Hassan Najmi and Saadi Yousef. One of the defining traits of his literary work is miscegenation. Trino Cruz has given the opinion that "Gibraltarian literature is a literature nonata" (not yet born), attributing that status to political forces blocking the "creative instincts".

== Works ==
A list of published compilations of poems authored by Cruz follows:

- Lecturas del espacio profanado (Sevilla, 1992)
- Breve antología. Colección Cuadernos del Aula de Literatura José Cadalso, núm. 19. (San Roque, 1993)
- Como la mirada que ha de pervertir este espejo. Actas del II Ciclo de Conferencias Universitarias del Campo de Gibraltar, Instituto de Estudios Campogibraltareños (Algeciras; 1996).
- Rihla. Colección Abalorios de poesía (San Roque, 2003).
- Rihla (translation of Khalid Raissouni; Tangiers, 2015)

== Bibliography ==
- Domínguez, César; Saussy, Haun; Villanueva, Darío (2015). Introducing comparative literature. New Trends and Applications. London and New York: Routledge. ISBN 978-0-415-70267-6.
- Domínguez, César (2010). "Historiography and the geo-literary imaginary. The Iberian Peninsula: Between Lebensraum and espace vécu". In Fernando Cabo Aseguinolaza; Anxo Abuín Gonzalez; César Domínguez (eds.). A Comparative History of Literatures in the Iberian Peninsula. Vol. 1. Amsterdam and Philadelphia: John Benjamins Publishing Company. pp. 53–132. ISBN 978-90-272-3457-5.
- Luque, Alejandro (9 April 2003). "El gibraltareño Trino Cruz reúne dos décadas de su mejor poesía". El País.
- Stotesbury, John A. (2016). "Detecting a Literary Future in the Historical Past: The Gibraltar Case" (PDF). Armenian Folia Anglistika: 123–134.
- Yborra Aznar, José Juan (2005). "La frontera estéril: la literatura en español en Gibraltar". El Español en el Mundo. Anuario del Instituto Cervantes. Instituto Cervantes.
- Yborra Aznar, José Juan (2002). "Espejos y espejismos: la poesía de Trino Cruz". Eúphoros. Universidad Nacional de Educación a Distancia: 23. ISSN 1575-0205.
