= Ettore Maestranzi =

Swiss cyclist

Personal information
- Born: 1 February 1914
- Died: 1 July 1966 (aged 52)

Cycling career
- Sport: Cycling
- Discipline: Road
- Role: Rider

Ettore Maestranzi (1 February 1914 – 1 July 1966) was a Swiss racing cyclist. He rode in the 1939 Tour de France.
