= Victor Codron =

French cyclist

Personal information
- Born: 24 December 1914 Templeuve-en-Pévèle, France
- Died: 7 June 1997 (aged 82) Roubaix, France

Cycling career
- Sport: Cycling
- Discipline: Road
- Role: Rider

Victor Codron (24 December 1914 – 7 June 1997) was a French racing cyclist. He rode in the 1939 Tour de France.
