= Edmond Delathouwer =

Belgian cyclist

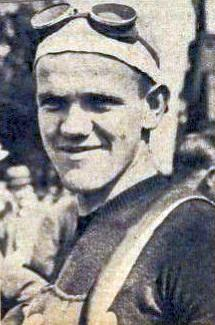
- Edmond Delathouwer in 1939

Personal information
- Born: 26 May 1916
- Died: 26 August 1994 (aged 78)

Cycling career
- Sport: Cycling
- Discipline: Road racer
- Role: Rider

Major wins
- 1st in La Flèche Wallonne (1939); 2nd in Gent–Wevelgem (1938)

Edmond Delathouwer (26 May 1916 – 26 August 1994) was a professional road bicycle racer from Belgium. At age 23, Delathouwer won the classic 1939 La Flèche Wallonne.

== Major results ==
1938
2nd, Gent–Wevelgem
1939
1st, La Flèche Wallonne
13th, Liège–Bastogne–Liège
Tour de France

3rd, Stage 3
4th, Stage 1
