= Lucien Bidinger =

Luxembourgish cyclist

Personal information
- Born: 8 June 1917
- Died: 14 December 1982 (aged 65)

Cycling career
- Sport: Cycling
- Discipline: Road
- Role: Rider

Lucien Bidinger (8 June 1917 – 14 December 1982) was a Luxembourgish racing cyclist. He rode in the 1939 Tour de France.
