= 1939 Tour de France =

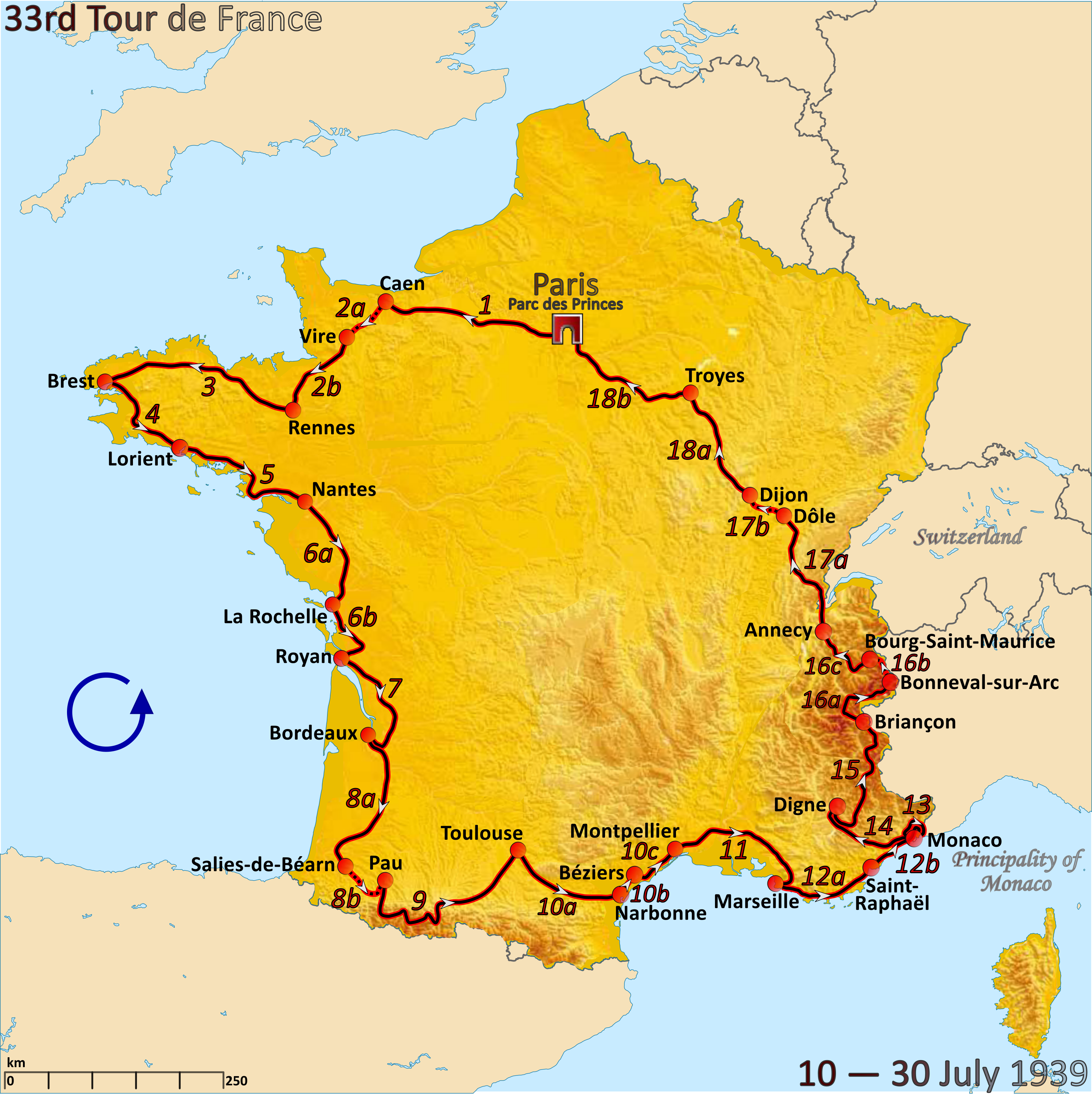
- Route of the 1939 Tour de France followed counterclockwise, starting in Paris

Race details
- Dates: 10–30 July 1939
- Stages: 18, including eight split stages
- Distance: 4,224 km (2,625 mi)
- Winning time: 132h 03' 17"

Results
Jersey awarded to the overall winner	Winner	Sylvère Maes (BEL)	(Belgium)
	Second	René Vietto (FRA)	(South-East)
	Third	Lucien Vlaemynck (BEL)	(Belgium B)
	Mountains	Sylvère Maes (BEL)	(Belgium)
	Team	Belgium B	

The 1939 Tour de France was the 33rd edition of the Tour de France, taking place from 10 to 30 July. The total distance was 4,224 km (2,625 mi).

Taking place on the eve of World War II, there was already much animosity in Europe. Italy, Germany and Spain all declined to send teams to the race, so the 1938 Italian champion Gino Bartali would not be defending his title. To fill out the ranks, Belgium sent two teams, and France had five teams. This would be the final Tour for eight years, until 1947.

Between the second and the seventh stage, the last rider in the general classification was eliminated.

The race was won by Belgian Sylvère Maes who also won the mountains classification.

== Innovations and changes ==
For the first time, a mountain time trial was scheduled: stage 16b. A rule was added to make it more difficult to finish the race: from the second stage to the seventh stage, the last rider in the classification was to be removed from the race.

The nutrition of the cyclists became more professional: cyclists were reporting that the use of vitamins increased their performance.

== Teams ==
Because Italy, Germany and Spain did not send teams, the Tour organisation were short on participating cyclists. To solve this, they allowed Belgium to send two teams, and France to send four additional regional teams.

The French cyclists had been successful in the 1930s, but their Tour winners were absent in 1939: 1930 and 1932 winner André Leducq had retired in 1938, as had 1931 and 1934 winner Antonin Magne; 1933 winner Georges Speicher did not ride, and 1937 winner Roger Lapébie was injured. This all made the Belgian team favourite.

The teams entering the race were:

- Belgium
- Switzerland
- Luxembourg
- Netherlands
- France
- Belgium B
- France North-East/Île de France
- France West
- France South-West
- France South-East

== Route and stages ==
The highest point of elevation in the race was 2,770 m (9,090 ft) at the summit of the Col de l'Iseran mountain pass on stage 16b.

Stage characteristics and winners
Stage	Date	Course	Distance	Type (Note: The icons shown here indicate whether the stage was run as a time trial, the stage was flat or the stage included mountains for the mountains classification. Stage 16b was a time trial that included a mountain.)	Winner
1	10 July	Paris to Caen	215 km (134 mi)	Plain stage	Amédée Fournier (FRA)
2a	11 July	Caen to Vire	64 km (40 mi)	Individual time trial	Romain Maes (BEL)
2b	11 July	Vire to Rennes	119 km (74 mi)	Plain stage	Éloi Tassin (FRA)
3	12 July	Rennes to Brest	244 km (152 mi)	Plain stage	Pierre Cloarec (FRA)
4	13 July	Brest to Lorient	174 km (108 mi)	Plain stage	Raymond Louviot (FRA)
5	14 July	Lorient to Nantes	207 km (129 mi)	Plain stage	Amédée Fournier (FRA)
6a	15 July	Nantes to La Rochelle	144 km (89 mi)	Plain stage	Lucien Storme (BEL)
6b	15 July	La Rochelle to Royan	107 km (66 mi)	Plain stage	Edmond Pagès (FRA)
	16 July	Royan		Rest day	
7	17 July	Royan to Bordeaux	198 km (123 mi)	Plain stage	Raymond Passat (FRA)
8a	18 July	Bordeaux to Salies-de-Béarn	210 km (130 mi)	Plain stage	Marcel Kint (BEL)
8b	18 July	Salies-de-Béarn to Pau	69 km (43 mi)	Individual time trial	Karl Litschi (SUI)
9	19 July	Pau to Toulouse	311 km (193 mi)	Stage with mountain(s)	Edward Vissers (BEL)
	20 July	Toulouse		Rest day	
10a	21 July	Toulouse to Narbonne	149 km (93 mi)	Plain stage	Pierre Jaminet (FRA)
10b	21 July	Narbonne to Béziers	27 km (17 mi)	Individual time trial	Maurice Archambaud (FRA)
10c	21 July	Béziers to Montpellier	70 km (43 mi)	Plain stage	Maurice Archambaud (FRA)
11	22 July	Montpellier to Marseille	212 km (132 mi)	Plain stage	Fabien Galateau (FRA)
12a	23 July	Marseille to Saint-Raphaël	157 km (98 mi)	Plain stage	François Neuens (LUX)
12b	23 July	Saint-Raphaël to Monaco	122 km (76 mi)	Plain stage	Maurice Archambaud (FRA)
13	24 July	Monaco to Monaco	101 km (63 mi)	Stage with mountain(s)	Pierre Gallien (FRA)
14	25 July	Monaco to Digne	175 km (109 mi)	Plain stage	Pierre Cloarec (FRA)
15	26 July	Digne to Briançon	219 km (136 mi)	Stage with mountain(s)	Sylvère Maes (BEL)
16a	27 July	Briançon to Bonneval	126 km (78 mi)	Stage with mountain(s)	Pierre Jaminet (FRA)
16b	27 July	Bonneval to Bourg-Saint-Maurice	64 km (40 mi)	Mountain time trial	Sylvère Maes (BEL)
16c	27 July	Bourg-Saint-Maurice to Annecy	104 km (65 mi)	Plain stage	Antoon van Schendel (NED)
	28 July	Annecy		Rest day	
17a	29 July	Annecy to Dôle	226 km (140 mi)	Stage with mountain(s)	François Neuens (LUX)
17b	29 July	Dôle to Dijon	59 km (37 mi)	Individual time trial	Maurice Archambaud (FRA)
18a	30 July	Dijon to Troyes	151 km (94 mi)	Plain stage	René Le Grevès (FRA)
18b	30 July	Troyes to Paris	201 km (125 mi)	Plain stage	Marcel Kint (BEL)
	Total		4,224 km (2,625 mi)		

== Race overview ==
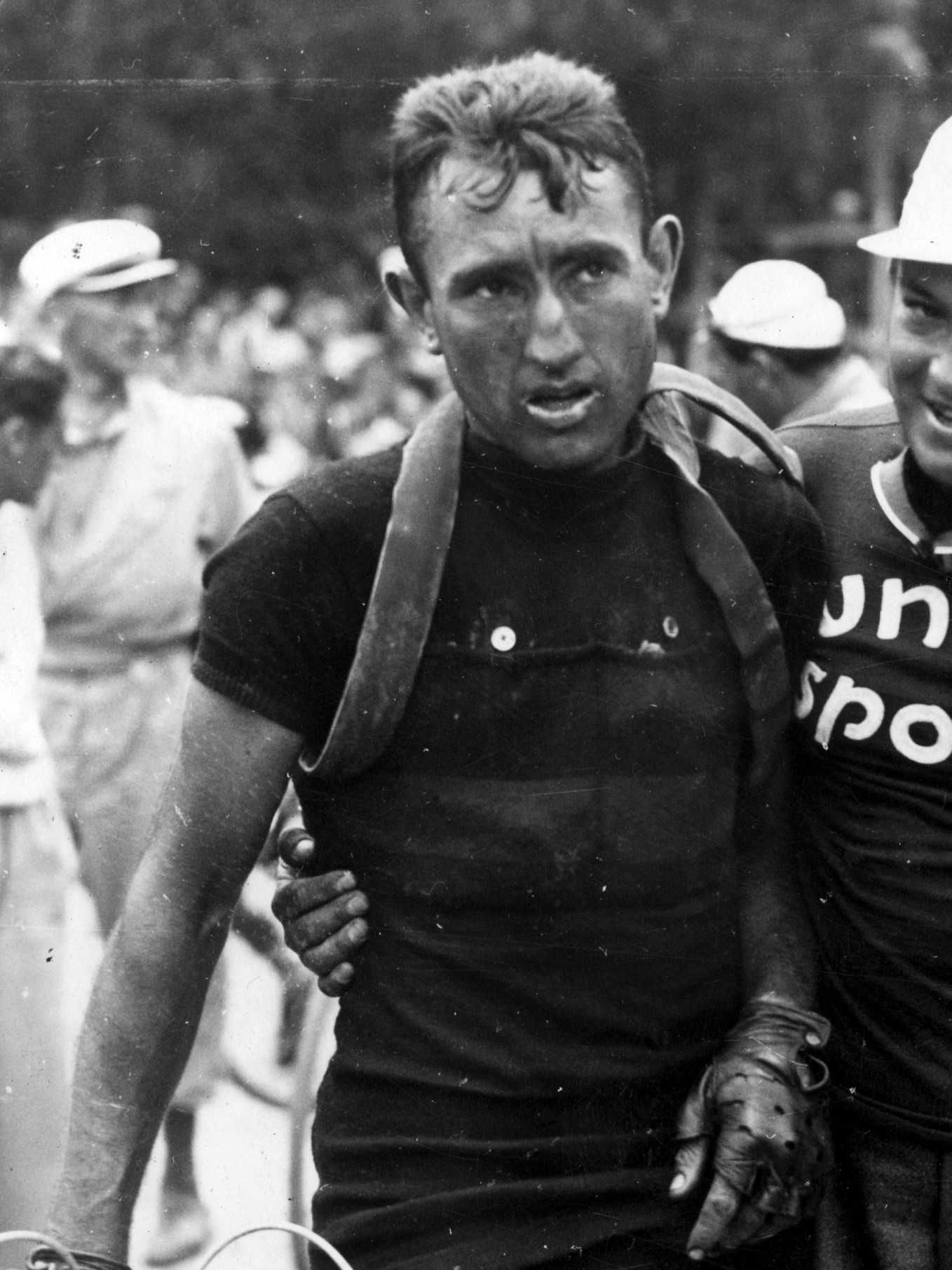
Sylvère Maes (pictured at the Tour 1936), winner of the general classification

In the first stage, regional Amedée Fournier won the sprint of a group of nine cyclists, and was the first cyclist in 1939 to wear the yellow jersey. In the next stage, Romain Maes, who had finished in the same group as Fournier, won the time trial, and captured the lead. He lost it in the second part of that stage, when a group got away. Three regional riders were now on top of the general classification, led by Jean Fontenay.

René Vietto, leader of the regional South-East team, was in second place. In the fourth stage, Vietto got into the winning break, and took over the lead, closesly followed by Mathias Clemens on six seconds.

In the ninth stage, the single Pyrenees stage of 1939, Edward Vissers attacked instead of helping his team leader Sylvère Maes. Vissers won the stage, but Vietto was able to stay with Maes. Maes climbed to the second place in the general classification, three minutes behind Vietto.

Maes was able to win back a little time, and just before the Alps were climbed from stage 15 on, Vietto was still leading, with Maes still in second place, two minutes behind. Sylvère Maes attacked on that stage, and Vietto was not able to follow. Vietto finished 17 minutes behind Maes, and lost the lead. The next stage was split in three split stages. In the first part, Vietto was able to stay close to Maes, but in the second part, the individual mountain time trial, Maes won ten minutes on Vietto. Maes was now leading with a margin of 27 minutes, and the victory seemed secure.

In the last stages, Maes was able to extend his lead with a few more minutes. Maes became the winner, with a margin of more than half an hour.

== Classification leadership and minor prizes ==
The time that each cyclist required to finish each stage was recorded, and these times were added together for the general classification. If a cyclist had received a time bonus, it was subtracted from this total; all time penalties were added to this total. The cyclist with the least accumulated time was the race leader, identified by the yellow jersey. Of the 79 cyclists that started the race, 49 finished.

For the mountains classification, 10 mountains were selected by the Tour organisation. The mountains classification in 1939 was won by Sylvère Maes. The first cyclist to reach the top received 10 points, the second cyclist 9 points, and so on until the tenth cyclist who received 1 point.

The team classification was calculated in 1939 by adding up the times of the best three cyclists of a team; the team with the least time was the winner. In 1939, there were ten teams of eight cyclists. There were the national teams of Belgium, Switzerland, Luxembourg, Netherlands, and France. Belgium also sent a second team, "Belgium B". Finally, there were four regional French teams: North-East, West, South-West and South-East. The South-West team was registered with eight cyclist, but only seven cyclists started the race. Only two of the South-West cyclists finished the race, so they were not in the team classification.

Classification leadership by stage
Stage	Winner	General classification	Mountains classification (Note: No jersey was awarded to the leader of the mountains classification until a white jersey with red polka dots was introduced in 1975.)	Team classification
1	Romain Maes	Amédée Fournier	no award	Belgium A
2a	Éloi Tassin	Romain Maes	no award	Belgium A
2b	Pierre Cloarec	Jean Fontenay	no award	France-West
3	Raymond Louviot	Jean Fontenay	no award	France-West
4	Amédée Fournier	René Vietto	no award	France-West
5	Lucien Storme	René Vietto	no award	France-West
6a	Edmond Pagès	René Vietto	no award	France-West
6b	Raymond Passat	René Vietto	no award	France-West
7	Marcel Kint	René Vietto	no award	Belgium B
8a	Karl Litschi	René Vietto	no award	Belgium B
8b	Edward Vissers	René Vietto	no award	Belgium B
9	Pierre Jaminet	René Vietto	Edward Vissers	Belgium B
10a	Pierre Jaminet	René Vietto	Edward Vissers	Belgium B
10b	Maurice Archambaud	René Vietto	Edward Vissers	Belgium B
10c	Maurice Archambaud	René Vietto	Edward Vissers	Belgium B
11	Fabien Galateau	René Vietto	Edward Vissers	Belgium B
12a	François Neuens	René Vietto	Edward Vissers	Belgium B
12b	Maurice Archambaud	René Vietto	Edward Vissers	Belgium B
13	Pierre Gallien	René Vietto	Edward Vissers	Belgium B
14	Pierre Cloarec	René Vietto	Edward Vissers	Belgium B
15	Sylvère Maes	Sylvère Maes	Edward Vissers	Belgium B
16a	Pierre Jaminet	Sylvère Maes	Edward Vissers	Belgium B
16b	Sylvère Maes	Sylvère Maes	Sylvère Maes	Belgium B
16c	Antoon van Schendel	Sylvère Maes	Sylvère Maes	Belgium B
17a	François Neuens	Sylvère Maes	Sylvère Maes	Belgium B
17b	Maurice Archambaud	Sylvère Maes	Sylvère Maes	Belgium B
18a	René Le Grevès	Sylvère Maes	Sylvère Maes	Belgium B
18b	Marcel Kint	Sylvère Maes	Sylvère Maes	Belgium B
Final		Sylvère Maes	Sylvère Maes	Belgium B

== Final standings ==
=== General classification ===
Final general classification (1–10)
Rank	Rider	Team	Time
1	Sylvère Maes (BEL)	Belgium	132h 03' 17"
2	René Vietto (FRA)	South-East	+ 30' 38"
3	Lucien Vlaemynck (BEL)	Belgium B	+ 32' 08"
4	Mathias Clemens (LUX)	Luxembourg	+ 36' 09"
5	Edward Vissers (BEL)	Belgium	+ 38' 05"
6	Sylvain Marcaillou (FRA)	France	+ 45' 16"
7	Albertin Disseaux (BEL)	Belgium B	+ 46' 54"
8	Jan Lambrichs (NED)	Netherlands	+ 48' 01"
9	Albert Ritserveldt (BEL)	Belgium B	+ 48' 27"
10	Cyriel Vanoverberghe (BEL)	Belgium B	+ 49' 44"

Final general classification (11–49)
Rank	Rider	Team	Time
11	Dante Gianello (FRA)	France	+ 55' 55"
12	Raymond Passat (FRA)	South-West	+ 57' 23"
13	Auguste Mallet (FRA)	France	+ 1h 02' 05"
14	Maurice Archambaud (FRA)	Ile de France/North East	+ 1h 06' 24"
15	Albert van Schendel (NED)	Netherlands	+ 1h 10' 01"
16	Pierre Gallien (FRA)	Ile de France/North East	+ 1h 10' 22"
17	Louis Thiétard (FRA)	Ile de France/North East	+ 1h 13' 33"
18	Christophe Didier (LUX)	Luxembourg	+ 1h 19' 07"
19	Georges Naisse (FRA)	France	+ 1h 23' 53"
20	Pierre Clemens (LUX)	Luxembourg	+ 1h 24' 48"
21	Albert Perikel (BEL)	Belgium B	+ 1h 26' 59"
22	Fabien Galateau (FRA)	South-East	+ 1h 28' 59"
23	Edmond Pagès (FRA)	South-West	+ 1h 35' 24"
24	Oreste Bernardoni (FRA)	South-East	+ 1h 46' 01"
25	Victor Cosson (FRA)	France	+ 1h 47' 47"
26	Albert Hendrickx (BEL)	Belgium	+ 2h 04' 42"
27	François Neuville (BEL)	Belgium	+ 2h 15' 24"
28	André de Korver (NED)	Netherlands	+ 2h 15' 34"
29	Raymond Louviot (FRA)	France	+ 2h 16' 58"
30	Josef Wagner (SUI)	Switzerland	+ 2h 18' 38"
31	Pierre Cloarec (FRA)	West	+ 2h 19' 48"
32	Éloi Tassin (FRA)	West	+ 2h 21' 19"
33	Charles Berty (FRA)	South-East	+ 2h 23' 45"
34	Marcel Kint (BEL)	Belgium	+ 2h 24' 35"
35	Lucien Le Guével (FRA)	France	+ 2h 37' 54"
36	Trino Yelamos (FRA)	South-East	+ 2h 38' 04"
37	Joseph Aureille (FRA)	South-East	+ 2h 46' 15"
38	Antoon van Schendel (NED)	Netherlands	+ 2h 51' 06"
39	Jozef Dominicus (NED)	Netherlands	+ 2h 53' 19"
40	Victor Codron (FRA)	Ile de France/North East	+ 3h 07' 02"
41	Théo Perret (SUI)	Switzerland	+ 3h 14' 40"
42	François Neuens (LUX)	Luxembourg	+ 3h 15' 54"
43	Jean Fontenay (FRA)	West	+ 3h 16' 59"
44	René Pedroli (SUI)	Switzerland	+ 3h 19' 33"
45	René Le Grevès (FRA)	West	+ 3h 35' 53"
46	Janus Hellemons (NED)	Netherlands	+ 3h 44' 16"
47	Amédée Fournier (FRA)	Ile de France/North East	+ 4h 01' 56"
48	Joseph Soffietti (FRA)	South-East	+ 4h 18' 46"
49	Armand Le Moal (FRA)	West	+ 4h 26' 39"

=== Mountains classification ===
Mountains in the mountains classification
Stage	Rider	Height	Mountain range	Winner
9	Aubisque	1,709 metres (5,607 ft)	Pyrenees	Edward Vissers
9	Tourmalet	2,115 metres (6,939 ft)	Pyrenees	Edward Vissers
9	Aspin	1,489 metres (4,885 ft)	Pyrenees	Edward Vissers
13	Braus	1,002 metres (3,287 ft)	Alps-Maritimes	Sylvère Maes
15	Allos	2,250 metres (7,380 ft)	Alps	Edward Vissers
15	Vars	2,110 metres (6,920 ft)	Alps	Edward Vissers
15	Izoard	2,361 metres (7,746 ft)	Alps	Sylvère Maes
16a	Galibier	2,556 metres (8,386 ft)	Alps	Dante Gianello
16	Iseran	2,770 metres (9,090 ft)	Alps	Sylvère Maes
17a	Faucille	1,320 metres (4,330 ft)	Alps	Sylvère Maes

Final mountains classification (1–10)
Rank	Rider	Team	Points
1	Sylvère Maes (BEL)	Belgium	86
2	Edward Vissers (BEL)	Belgium	84
3	Albert Ritseveldt (BEL)	Belgium B	71
4	Dante Gianello (FRA)	France	61
5	René Vietto (FRA)	South-East	22
5	Christophe Didier (LUX)	Luxembourg	22
7	Victor Cosson (FRA)	France	18
8	Pierre Gallien (FRA)	North-East	17
9	Louis Thiétard (FRA)	North-East	16
9	Oreste Bernardoni (FRA)	South-East	16

=== Team classification ===
Final team classification (1–9)
Rank	Team	Time
1	Belgium B	398h 17' 20"
2	France	+ 35' 47"
3	Belgium	+ 36' 18"
4	Luxembourg	+ 1h 12' 35"
5	France North-East	+ 1h 23' 20"
6	France South-East	+ 1h 38' 09"
7	Netherlands	+ 2h 06' 07"
8	France West	+ 5h 50' 37"
9	Switzerland	+ 6h 45' 27"

== Aftermath ==
Although he did not win the race, René Vietto became a popular cyclist. He was the most popular runner-up in France until Raymond Poulidor.

The sales of the organising newspaper l'Auto had dropped to 164000, and the newspaper was sold to Raymond Patenôtre. A few months after Germany had conquered France in the Second World War, Patenôtre sold l'Auto to the Germans.

Directly after the Tour, the organisation announced the 1940 Tour de France would be run in 20 stages and five rest days. But the Second World War made it impossible to hold a Tour de France in the next years, although some replacing races were held. Only in 1947 would the Tour be held again, and Vietto would again play an important role then, holding the yellow jersey as leader of the general classification for 15 of the 21 stages.

The victory of Maes would be the last Belgian Tour victory for 30 years, until Eddy Merckx won the 1969 Tour de France.

== Bibliography ==
- Augendre, Jacques (2016). "Guide historique" [Historical guide] (PDF). Tour de France (in French). Paris: Amaury Sport Organisation. Archived (PDF) from the original on 17 August 2016.
- Bowen, Wayne H (2006). Spain During World War II. Columbia, MO: University of Missouri Press. ISBN 978-0-8262-1658-8.
- McGann, Bill; McGann, Carol (2006). The Story of the Tour de France: 1903–1964. Vol. 1. Indianapolis, IN: Dog Ear Publishing. ISBN 978-1-59858-180-5.
- Nauright, John; Parrish, Charles (2012). Sports Around the World: History, Culture, and Practice. Vol. 2. Santa Barbara, CA: ABC-CLIO. ISBN 978-1-59884-300-2.
- Thompson, Christopher S. (2008). The Tour de France: A Cultural History. Oakland, CA: University of California Press. ISBN 978-0-520-25630-9.
