= Werner Jaisli (artist) =

Swiss artist (1949–2021)

Werner Jaisli was a traveler and Swiss artist born on 4 January 1949. He died in December 2021.

== Life ==
Jaisli built a UFOport - a landing strip for extraterrestrials - three kilometres from the city of Cachi, Argentina. The building, also known as the "Star of Hope", was recognised as architectural and urban heritage of the province of Salta in a vote by provincial deputies in September 2020.

According to reports, Jaisli was dressed in an original way, sporting a large beard and druid clothing.

Over the years, the town of Cachi has become a place of pilgrimage for enthusiasts of the UFOs.

== Star of Hope ==
Jaisli's master work is a large star made up of 36 branches, 48 metres in diameter, with a smaller star at its centre. Everything is made of stones transported from the surrounding area and bleached. Jaisli built it between 2008 and 2012.

Jaisli built his star after a Close Encounter of the third kind in 2008, where he claimed to have received telepathically orders of two UFOs.

== Poet ==
Jaisli wrote poetry that he never published on a commercial basis, but gave as gifts to his friends.

== External websites ==
- Web site created by Werner Jaisli about his star of hope
