= Lucien Storme =

Belgian cyclist

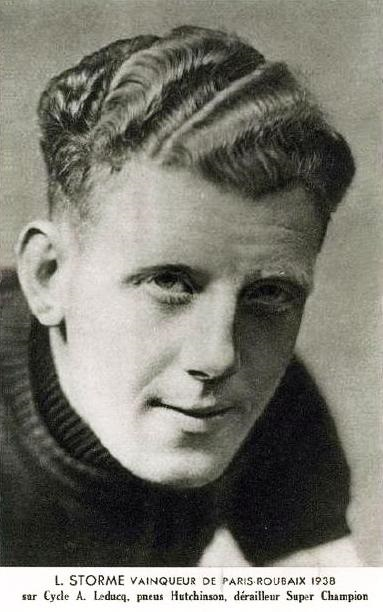
- Portrait of Lucien Storme

Personal information
- Full name: Lucien Storme
- Born: 18 June 1916 Nieuwkerke, Belgium
- Died: 10 April 1945 (aged 28) Siegburg, Germany

Cycling career
- Sport: Cycling
- Discipline: Road
- Role: Rider

Major wins
- Paris–Roubaix (1938)

Lucien Storme (18 June 1916 – 10 April 1945) was a Belgian professional road bicycle racer. He won the 1938 Paris–Roubaix. In December 1942, he was taken prisoner by the Germans for smuggling. In 1945, at the end of the Second World War, he was accidentally shot by the Americans.

== Major results ==
1938
Paris–Roubaix
1939
Tour de France:

Winner stage 6A

1940
Kortrijk
