= Salies-de-Béarn =

- Commune
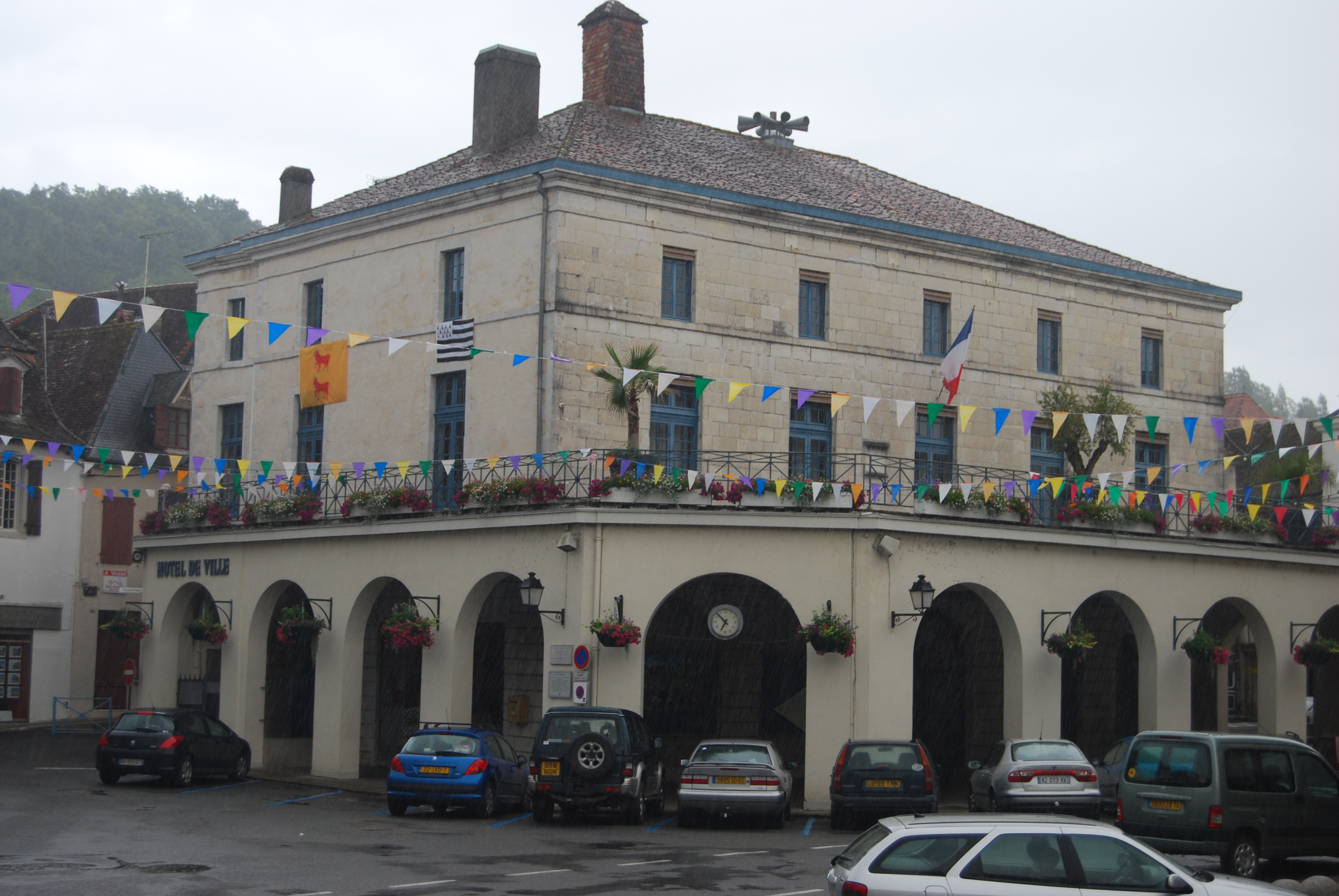
- Town Hall

- Coat of arms
- Location of Salies-de-Béarn
- Location within France Location within Nouvelle-Aquitaine
- Coordinates: 43°28′16″N 0°55′30″W
- Country: France
- Region: Nouvelle-Aquitaine
- Department: Pyrénées-Atlantiques
- Arrondissement: Oloron-Sainte-Marie
- Canton: Orthez et Terres des Gaves et du Sel

Government
  - Mayor (2020–2026): Thierry Cabanne
- Area^{1}: 52.08 km^{2} (20.11 sq mi)
- Elevation: 56 m (184 ft)
- Highest elevation: 202 m (663 ft)
- Lowest elevation: 28 m (92 ft)
- Population (2023): 4,742
  - Density: 91.05/km^{2} (235.8/sq mi)
- Time zone: UTC+01:00 (CET)
  - Summer (DST): UTC+02:00 (CEST)
- INSEE/Postal code: 64499 /64270
- ^{1} French Land Register data, which excludes lakes, ponds, glaciers > 1 km^{2} (0.386 sq mi or 247 acres) and river estuaries.

Salies-de-Béarn (French pronunciation: [salis də beaʁn], literally Salies of Béarn; Occitan: Salias) is a commune in the Pyrénées-Atlantiques department in south-western France.

The name comes from its naturally occurring saline water (Gascon salias for Standard Occitan salinas). During the expanded, pre-liberation occupation of France by Nazi Germany, Salies was on the border between the occupied zone and the free zone.

Between September 1941 and the summer of 1942, Jean Anouilh wrote his famous adaptation of Sophocles' tragedy, Antigone in the comparatively idyllic setting of Salies-de-Béarn, relieved of the invader's presence, the evening curfews and the deprivations of Paris. The play premiered in Occupied Paris in February 1944.

Salies-de-Béarn served as the setting for the writer Trevanian's novel, The Summer of Katya. In the book, it was renamed Salies-les-Bains.

An account of living and working in Salies-de-Béarn in the late sixties is given by Clive Jackson in his book Footloose in France.

== Population ==
Historical population
Year	Pop.	±% p.a.
1968	5,582	—
1975	5,355	−0.59%
1982	4,957	−1.10%
1990	4,974	+0.04%
1999	4,759	−0.49%
2007	4,803	+0.12%
2012	4,854	+0.21%
2017	4,638	−0.91%
2023	4,742	+0.37%
Source: INSEE

== See also ==
- Communes of the Pyrénées-Atlantiques department
