= Pierre Gallien =

French cyclist

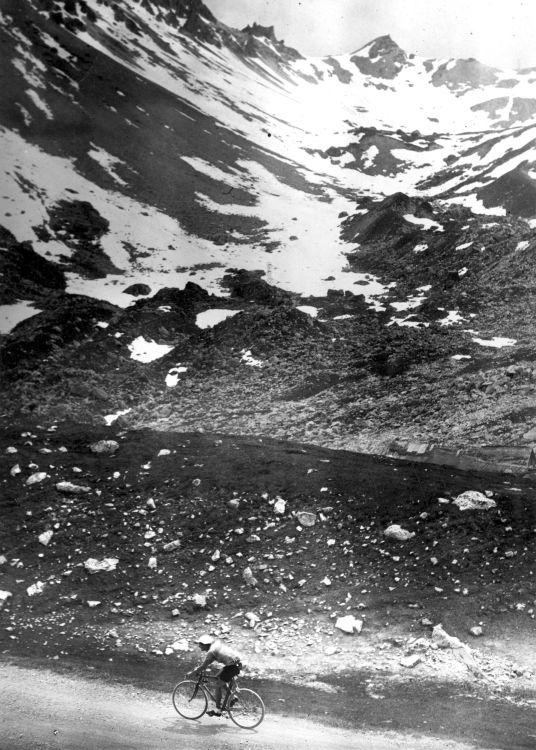
- Pierre Gallien in the French Alps at the 1937 Tour de France

Personal information
- Full name: Pierre Gallien
- Born: 19 November 1911 Paris, France
- Died: 28 May 2009 (aged 97) Barcelona, Spain

Cycling career
- Sport: Cycling
- Discipline: Road
- Role: Rider

Major wins
- One stage 1939 Tour de France

Pierre Gallien (19 November 1911 – 28 May 2009) was a French professional road bicycle racer, who won one stage in the 1939 Tour de France. He was born in Paris.

== Major results ==
1936
Tour of Romania, overall winner
1937
Tour de France:

8th place overall classification

1939
Tour de France:

Winner stage 13
