= Armand Le Moal =

French cyclist

Personal information
- Full name: Armand Le Moal
- Born: 4 May 1914 Étampes, France
- Died: 27 July 1999 (aged 86) Bénodet, France

Cycling career
- Sport: Cycling
- Role: Rider

Armand Le Moal (4 May 1914 – 27 July 1999) was a French racing cyclist. He finished in last place in the 1939 Tour de France.
