= Werner Jaisli (cyclist) =

Swiss cyclist

Personal information
- Born: 8 November 1915
- Died: 30 January 2010 (aged 94)

Cycling career
- Sport: Cycling
- Discipline: Road
- Role: Rider

Werner Jaisli (8 November 1915 – 30 January 2010) was a Swiss racing cyclist. He rode in the 1939 Tour de France.
