= Jef Dominicus =

Dutch cyclist

Personal information
- Born: 13 April 1913
- Died: 8 December 2001 (aged 88)

Cycling career
- Sport: Cycling
- Discipline: Road
- Role: Rider

Jef Dominicus (13 April 1913 – 8 December 2001) was a Dutch racing cyclist. He rode in the 1938 Tour de France.
