= Joseph Aureille =

French cyclist

Personal information
- Born: 1 April 1914
- Died: 25 November 1981 (aged 67)

Cycling career
- Sport: Cycling
- Discipline: Road
- Role: Rider

Joseph Aureille (1 April 1914 – 25 November 1981) was a French racing cyclist. He rode in the 1939 Tour de France.
