= François Neuens =

Road bicycle racer

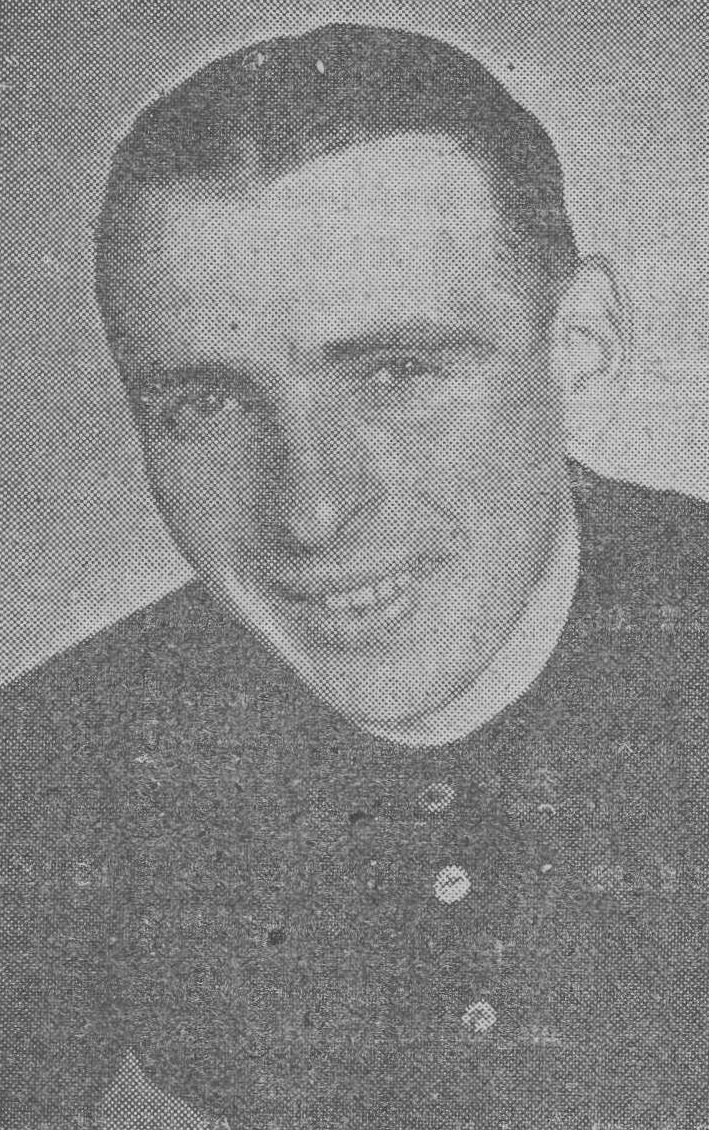

Personal information
- Born: 6 September 1912 Luxembourg
- Died: 27 August 1985 (aged 72)

Cycling career
- Sport: Cycling
- Discipline: Road
- Role: Rider

Major wins
- Two stages 1939 Tour de France

François Neuens (Gonderange, 6 September 1912 – Wiltz, 27 August 1985) was a Luxembourgish professional road bicycle racer. In the 1939 Tour de France, Neuens won two stages. During the Second World War, Neuens won two editions of the Tour de Luxembourg. He competed in the individual and team road race events at the 1936 Summer Olympics.

== Major results ==
1938
Luxembourg – Nancy
Tour du Lac Léman
1939
Tour de France:

Winner stages 12A and 17A

1941
Echarpe d'Or
1942
Tour de Luxembourg
1943
Tour de Luxembourg
