= Albert van Schendel =

Dutch cyclist

Personal information
- Full name: Albert van Schendel
- Born: 21 September 1912 Lage Zwaluwe, the Netherlands
- Died: 12 April 1990 (aged 77) Muret, France

Cycling career
- Sport: Cycling
- Discipline: Road
- Role: Rider

Albert van Schendel (21 September 1912 in Lage Zwaluwe – 12 April 1990 in Muret, France) was a Dutch professional road bicycle racer. Albert van Schendel was the younger brother of cyclist Antoon van Schendel. He rode in the 1947 Tour de France, which was the first Tour since 1939, having been cancelled during World War II.

== Major results ==
1936
Bordeaux - Saintes
Derby du Nord
1937
Circuit du Gers
