= Fabien Galateau =

French cyclist (1913–1995)

Personal information
- Full name: Fabien Galateau
- Born: 13 July 1913 Nanteuil-la-Fosse, France
- Died: 23 July 1995 (aged 81) Avignon, France

Cycling career
- Sport: Cycling
- Discipline: Road
- Role: Rider

Major wins
- Two stages Tour de France

Fabien Galateau (13 July 1913 in Nanteuil-la-Fosse – 23 September 1995 in Avignon) was a French professional road bicycle racer. His brother Gabriel Galateau was also a cyclist. During the Tours de France of 1938 and 1939, Fabien Galateau won two stages.

== Major results ==
1936
Nice-Toulon-Nice
1937
Circuit del Ventor
1938
Tour de France:

Winner stage 19

Circuit de Cantal
1939
GP de l'Eco d'Alger
Manche-Océan
Tour de France:

Winner stage 1
