= Amédée Fournier =

French cyclist

Personal information
- Full name: Amédée Fournier
- Born: 7 February 1912 Armentières, France
- Died: 30 March 1992 (aged 80) Lecci, France

Cycling career
- Sport: Cycling
- Discipline: Road
- Role: Rider

Major wins
- Silver medal 1932 olympic games, team pursuit Two stages 1939 Tour de France
Medal record
Representing France
Men's track cycling
Olympic Games
| Silver medal – second place | 1932 Los Angeles | Team pursuit |

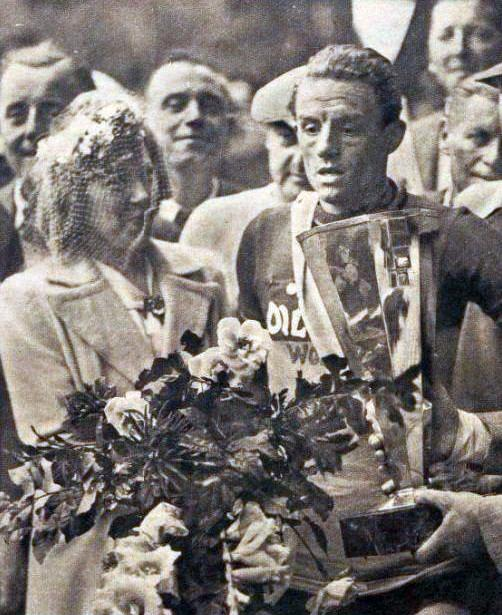
Amédée Fournier

Amédée Fournier (7 February 1912 – 30 March 1992) was a French professional road bicycle racer. He won a silver medal at the 1932 Summer Olympics in the team pursuit event.

== Major results ==
1932
Silver medal 1932 olympic games, team pursuit
1938
Nantes - Les Sables d'Olonne
1939
Tour de France

Winner stages 1 and 5
Wearing yellow jersey for one day
