= Joseph Soffietti =

French cyclist

Personal information
- Born: 9 September 1912
- Died: 30 January 2007 (aged 94)

Cycling career
- Sport: Cycling
- Discipline: Road
- Role: Rider

Joseph Soffietti (9 September 1912 – 30 January 2007) was a French racing cyclist. He rode in the 1937 Tour de France.
