= Raymond Passat =

French cyclist

Personal information
- Full name: Louis Raymond Passat
- Born: 28 December 1913 Gannat, Allier, France
- Died: 16 June 1988 (aged 74) Montluçon, France

Cycling career
- Sport: Cycling
- Discipline: Road
- Role: Rider

Major wins
- Two stages Tour de France

Louis Raymond Passat (28 December 1913 – 16 June 1988) was a French professional road bicycle racer. Passat won one stage in the 1937 Tour de France, and one stage in the 1939 Tour de France. He was born in Gannat.

== Major results ==
1937
Tour de France:

Winner stage 19A

1939
Circuit de Sologne
Tour de France:

Winner stage 7
