= Jean Fontenay =

French cyclist

Personal information
- Full name: Jean Fontenay
- Born: 23 July 1911 Hirel, France
- Died: 21 May 1975 (aged 63) Saint-Malo, France

Cycling career
- Sport: Cycling
- Discipline: Road
- Role: Rider

Jean Fontenay (23 July 1911 – 21 May 1975) was a French professional road bicycle racer between 1934 and 1939, and after World War II in 1947. In his career, he won three races, but he is remembered for wearing the yellow jersey in the 1939 Tour de France for two days.

== Palmarès ==
1935
Winner 2nd stage Tour de l'Ouest
1936
Paris–Nice:

Winner stage 5
2nd place overall

1938
Winner Manche-Ocean
