= Albert Perikel =

Belgian cyclist

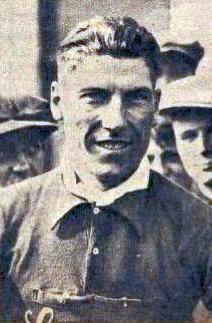
- Albert Périkel (1939)

Personal information
- Born: 3 May 1913
- Died: 9 August 1989 (aged 76)

Cycling career
- Sport: Cycling
- Discipline: Road
- Role: Rider

Albert Perikel (3 May 1913 – 9 August 1989) was a Belgian racing cyclist. He rode in the 1939 Tour de France.
