= Lucien Vlaemynck =

Belgian cyclist

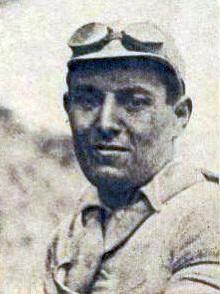
- A photograph of Lucien Vlaemynck (1939).

Personal information
- Full name: Lucien Vlaemynck
- Born: 19 August 1914 Izenberge, Belgium
- Died: 14 June 1994 (aged 79) Ledegem, Belgium

Cycling career
- Sport: Cycling
- Discipline: Road
- Role: Rider

Major wins
- 3rd place 1939 Tour de France

Lucien Vlaemynck (19 August 1914 – 14 June 1994) was a Belgian professional road bicycle racer. Vlaemynck rode his only Tour de France in 1939, when he finished third overall. He also finished in third place in the 1946 Paris–Roubaix.

== Major results ==
1937
Criterium du Midi
1938
Tour de Luxembourg
1939
Cannes
GP de l'Exposition de Liège (with Félicien Vervaecke)
Tour de France:

3rd place overall classification

1942
Micheroux
1943
GP de l'Auto
1944
Flèche Française (with Robert Bonnaventure, Emile Idée and Mickael Schmitt)
1945
Circuit de Paris
Sint-Lambrechts-Woluwe
Moorslede
1946
Kortijk
Waregem
