= Pierre Cloarec =

French cyclist

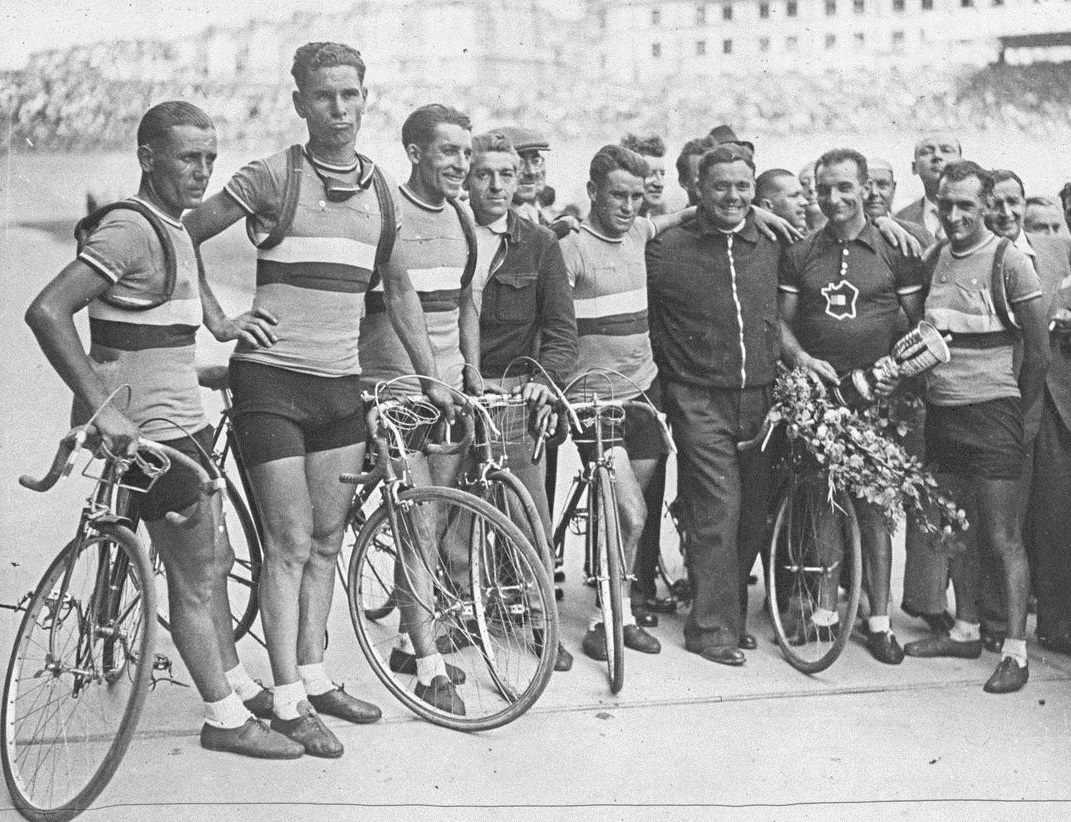
- Tour de France 25 juillet 1937

Personal information
- Full name: Pierre-Marie Cloarec
- Nickname: Clo-clo
- Born: 14 March 1909; Pleyben
- Died: 7 December 1994 (aged 85); Saint-Ouen-du-Tilleul

Cycling career
- Sport: Cycling
- Discipline: Road
- Role: Rider

Major wins
- Two stages 1939 Tour de France

Pierre Cloarec (14 March 1909 – 7 December 1994) was a French professional road bicycle racer. During his career, he won two stages in the Tour de France.

== Major results ==
1933
Boucles de l'Aulne
1935
Boucles de l'Aulne
Saint-Brieuc
1936
Boucles de l'Aulne
1937
Saint-Brieuc
Paris-Saint-Etienne
1938
Circuit du Morbihan
GP Ouest-France
Marseille-Lyon
Rouen-Caen-Rouen
1939
Tour de France:

Winner stages 3 and 14

Circuit de Douarnez
Criterium du Midi
Marseille-Lyon
Nantes-Les Sables d'Olonne
Paris–Camembert
