= Edmond Pagès =

French cyclist

Personal information
- Full name: Edmond Pagès
- Born: 2 May 1911 Boulogne-Billancourt, France
- Died: 28 February 1987 (aged 75) Boulogne-Billancourt, France

Cycling career
- Sport: Cycling
- Discipline: Road
- Role: Rider

Edmond Pagès (Boulogne-Billancourt, 2 May 1911 — 28 February 1987) was a French professional road bicycle racer. Pagès won a stage in the 1939 Tour de France.

== Major results ==
1939
Tour de France:

Winner stage 6B
