= Trinidad Yelamos =

French cyclist

Personal information
- Born: 14 April 1915 Serón, Spain
- Died: 17 January 1989 (aged 73) Salon-de-Provence, France

Cycling career
- Sport: Cycling
- Discipline: Road
- Role: Rider

Trinidad Yelamos (14 April 1915 – 17 January 1989) was a French racing cyclist. He rode in the 1939 Tour de France.
