= Eloi Tassin =

French cyclist

Éloi Tassin
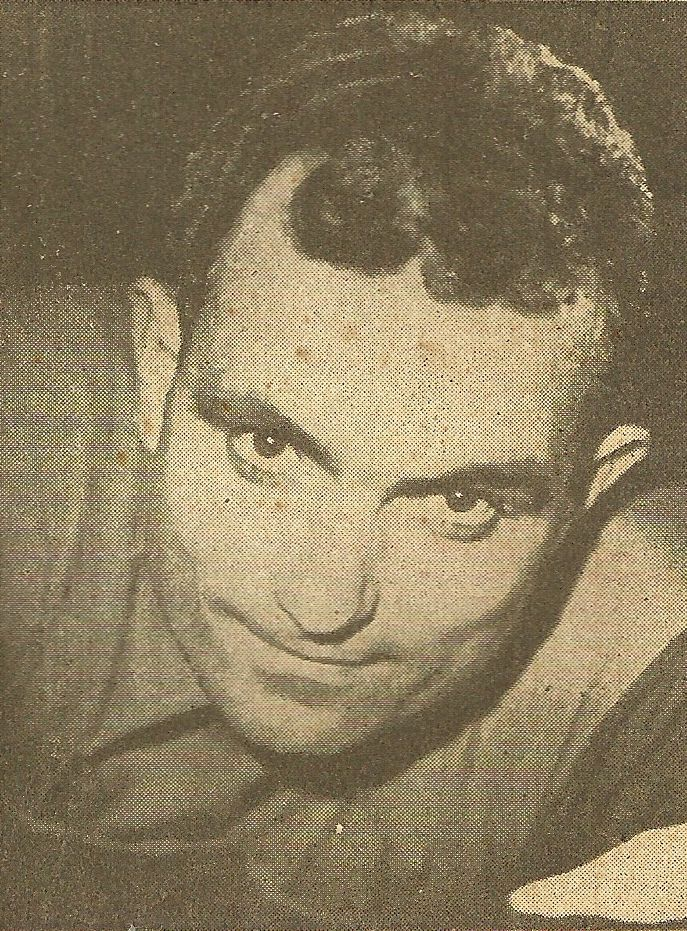

Personal information
- Full name: Éloi Roger Marie Joseph Tassin
- Born: 6 June 1912 Vay, France
- Died: 17 August 1977 (aged 65) Sables d'Olonne, France

Cycling career
- Sport: Cycling
- Discipline: Road
- Role: Rider

Major wins
- Grand Tours Tour de France 2 individual stages (1939, 1947) One-day races and Classics Grand Prix des Nations (1945) National Road Race Championships (1945)

Éloi Tassin (6 June 1912 — 17 August 1977) was a French professional road bicycle racer. Tassin won a stage in the 1939 Tour de France, and another stage in the 1947 Tour de France.

Allée Éloi Tassin in Nantes is named after him. A Éloi Tassin day was held in his honour at Vay on the 100th anniversary of his birth.

== Major results ==
1939
Circuit de l'Indre
Tour de France:

Winner stage 2B

1945
GP Ouest-France
France national road race championship
Manche-Océan
Grand Prix des Nations
1947
Tour de France:

Winner stage 17

1948
GP Ouest-France
