= Jan Lambrichs =

Dutch cyclist

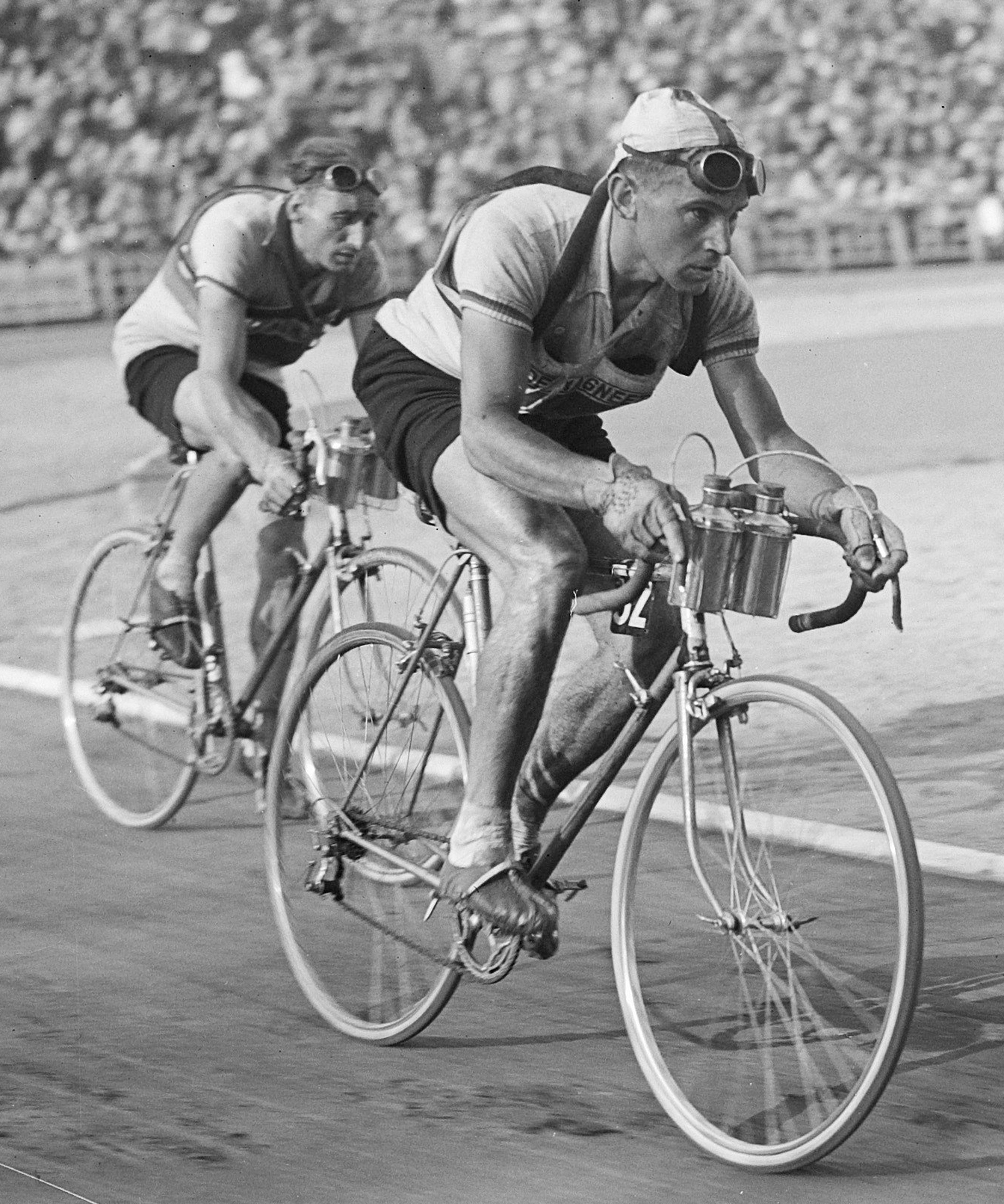
- Jan Lambrichs (Tour de France 1949)

Personal information
- Born: 21 June 1915 Bunde, Netherlands
- Died: 28 January 1990 (aged 74) Kerkrade, Netherlands

Cycling career
- Sport: Cycling
- Role: Rider

Major wins
- Grand Tours Vuelta a España 2 individual stages (1946)

Jan Lambrichs (21 June 1915 – 28 January 1990) was a Dutch racing cyclist. He finished eighth in the 1939 Tour de France and third in the 1946 Vuelta a España.

== Major results ==
1948
5th Tour de Romandie
