= Georges Naisse =

French cyclist

Personal information
- Born: 25 January 1914
- Died: 4 October 2001 (aged 87)

Cycling career
- Sport: Cycling
- Discipline: Road
- Role: Rider

Georges Naisse (25 January 1914 – 4 October 2001) was a French racing cyclist. He rode in the 1938 Tour de France.
