= Christophe Didier =

Luxembourgish cyclist

Personal information
- Born: 4 February 1915 Bour, Luxembourg
- Died: 24 July 1978 (aged 63) Strasbourg, France

Cycling career
- Sport: Cycling
- Discipline: Road
- Role: Rider

Professional teams
- 1938: M.Guimbretière
- 1939–1940: Alcyon–Dunlop
- 1940: Olympia
- 1941–1943: Phänomen
- 1944–1946: Individual

Christophe Didier (born 4 February 1915 in Bour – 24 July 1978 in Strasbourg) was a Luxembourgish cyclist. Professional from 1938 to 1946, he won the Volta a Catalunya in 1940 and the Tour de Luxembourg in 1941.

== Major results ==
1935
1st Amateur National Road Race Championships
1937
2nd Grand Prix François-Faber
1938
1st Amateur National Road Race Championships
1939
3rd Overall Tour de Suisse
1940
1st Overall Volta a Catalunya

1st Stage 4

1941
1st Overall Tour de Luxembourg
1942
2nd Overall Tour de Luxembourg
