= Oreste Bernardoni =

French cyclist (1911–1965)

Personal information
- Born: 28 February 1911
- Died: 10 August 1965 (aged 54)

Cycling career
- Sport: Cycling
- Discipline: Road
- Role: Rider

Oreste Bernardoni (28 February 1911 – 10 August 1965) was a French racing cyclist. He rode in the 1935 Tour de France.
