= Theo Perret =

Swiss cyclist

Personal information
- Born: 6 July 1915
- Died: 26 July 2008 (aged 93)

Cycling career
- Sport: Cycling
- Discipline: Road
- Role: Rider

Theo Perret (6 July 1915 – 26 July 2008) was a Swiss racing cyclist. He rode in the 1938 Tour de France.
