= Pierre Jaminet =

French cyclist

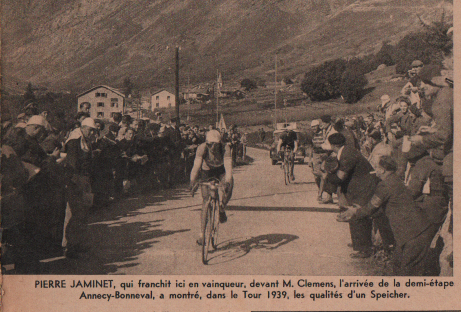

Personal information
- Full name: Pierre Jaminet
- Born: 12 February 1912 Paris, France
- Died: 7 December 1968 (aged 56) Le Havre, France

Cycling career
- Sport: Cycling
- Discipline: Road
- Role: Rider

Major wins
- Critérium International (1938)

Pierre Jaminet (Paris, 12 February 1912 — Le Havre, 7 December 1968) was a French professional road bicycle racer.

== Major results ==
1938
Critérium International
1939
Tour de France:

Winner stages 10 and 16A
