= André de Korver =

Dutch cyclist

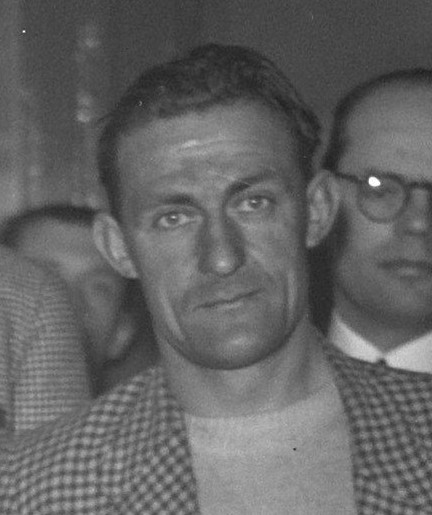

Personal information
- Born: 20 June 1915 Dordrecht, Netherlands
- Died: 25 February 1990 (aged 74) Breda, Netherlands

Cycling career
- Sport: Cycling
- Role: Rider

André de Korver (20 June 1915 – 25 February 1990) was a Dutch racing cyclist. He rode in the 1947 and 1949 Tour de France.
