= Karl Litschi =

Swiss cyclist (1912–1999)

Personal information
- Full name: Karl Litschi
- Born: 27 April 1912 Felben, Switzerland
- Died: 18 March 1999 (aged 86) Andelfingen, Switzerland

Cycling career
- Sport: Cycling
- Discipline: Road
- Role: Rider

Major wins
- Tour de Suisse (1937)

Karl Litschi (Felben, 27 April 1912 – Andelfingen, 18 March 1999) was a Swiss professional road bicycle racer. He was both a cyclo-cross cyclist and a road race cyclist, become Swiss national champion in both disciplines. In the 1939 Tour de France, he won one stage. In the same year he was the Swiss National Road Race champion.

== Major results ==
1937
Switzerland national cyclo-cross champion
Tour de Suisse
1938
Berner Rundfahrt
1939
GP de Cannes
Züri-Metzgete
Switzerland national road race champion
Tour de France:

Winner stage 8B

1941
Switzerland national road race champion
