= Cyriel Vanoverberghe =

Belgian cyclist

Personal information
- Born: 4 May 1912
- Died: 28 January 1995 (aged 82)

Cycling career
- Sport: Cycling
- Discipline: Road
- Role: Rider

Cyriel Vanoverberghe (4 May 1912 – 28 January 1995) was a Belgian racing cyclist. He rode in the 1936 Tour de France.
