= Auguste Mallet =

French cyclist

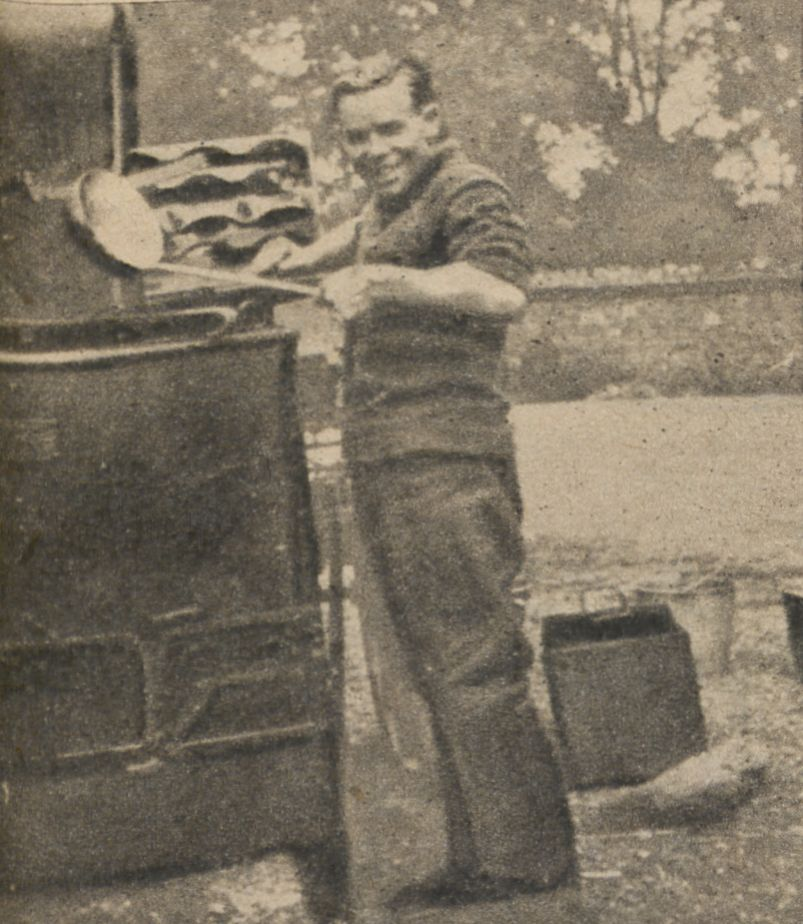
- Mallet in January 1940

Personal information
- Full name: Auguste Télémaque Adrien Mallet
- Nickname: Trompe la mort (Deceives death)
- Born: 3 May 1913 Thiergeville, France
- Died: 9 December 1946 (aged 33) Paris, France

Cycling career
- Sport: Cycling
- Discipline: Road
- Role: Rider

Auguste Mallet (3 May 1913 – 9 December 1946) was a French racing cyclist. He rode in the 1938 Tour de France.
