= Albert Ritserveldt =

Belgian cyclist

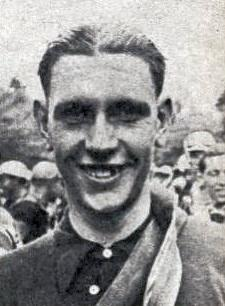
- Albert Ritserveldt (1939)

Personal information
- Born: 13 October 1915 Ophasselt, Belgium
- Died: 11 March 2002 (aged 86) Zottegem, Belgium

Cycling career
- Sport: Cycling
- Role: Rider

Albert Ritserveldt (13 October 1915 – 11 March 2002) was a Belgian racing cyclist. He won the 1939 edition of the Liège–Bastogne–Liège.
