= Antoon van Schendel =

Dutch cyclist

Personal information
- Full name: Antoon van Schendel
- Born: 9 May 1910 Lage Zwaluwe, the Netherlands
- Died: 6 August 1990 (aged 80) Muret, France

Cycling career
- Sport: Cycling
- Discipline: Road
- Role: Rider

Major wins
- One stage 1938 Tour de France

Antoon van Schendel (Lage Zwaluwe, 9 May 1910 – Muret, France, 6 August 1990) was a Dutch professional road bicycle racer. Born in the Netherlands, Antoon van Schendel became a professional cyclist in France. The highlight of his career was his stage victory (the 63-km Stage 10a) in the 1938 Tour de France. Antoon van Schendel was an older brother of cyclist Albert van Schendel, who also won one stage in the Tour de France.

== Major results ==
1935
Circuit de Samatan
GP Beauville
GP Peugeot
1938
Tour de France:

Winner stage 10A
