= Albertin Disseaux =

Belgian cyclist

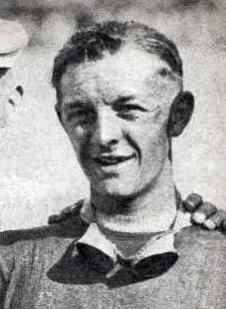
- Disseaux in 1939

Personal information
- Born: 17 November 1914
- Died: 10 July 2002 (aged 87)

Cycling career
- Sport: Cycling
- Discipline: Road
- Role: Rider

Albertin Disseaux (17 November 1914 – 10 July 2002) was a Belgian racing cyclist. He rode in the 1937 Tour de France.
