= List of teams and cyclists in the 1938 Tour de France =

List of cyclists

For the 1938 Tour de France, the big cycling nations, Belgium, Italy, Germany and France, each sent a team of 12 cyclists. Other countries, Spain, Luxembourg, Switzerland and the Netherlands, sent smaller teams of six cyclists each. The French had two extra teams of 12 cyclists, the Cadets and Bleuets.

The three most powerful teams were the Belgian, the French and the Italian national team. The Italian team was led by Bartali, who had was close to winning the Tour de France in 1937 until he crashed. The Italian cycling federation had requested him to skip the 1938 Giro d'Italia so he could focus on the Tour de France.

== By rider ==
Legend
No.	Starting number worn by the rider during the Tour
Pos.	Position in the general classification
DNF	Denotes a rider who did not finish

No.	Name	Nationality	Team	Pos.	Ref
1	Sylvère Maes	Belgium	Belgium	14	
2	Marcel Kint	Belgium	Belgium	9	
3	Félicien Vervaecke	Belgium	Belgium	2	
4	Albertin Disseaux	Belgium	Belgium	12	
5	Éloi Meulenberg	Belgium	Belgium	DNF	
6	Émile Masson Jr.	Belgium	Belgium	34	
7	Jules Lowie	Belgium	Belgium	7	
8	Edward Vissers	Belgium	Belgium	4	
9	François Neuville	Belgium	Belgium	17	
10	Theo Pirmez	Belgium	Belgium	DNF	
11	René Walschot	Belgium	Belgium	51	
12	Constant Lauwers	Belgium	Belgium	39	
13	Gino Bartali	Italy	Italy	1	
14	Vasco Bergamaschi	Italy	Italy	33	
15	Aldo Bini	Italy	Italy	48	
16	Enrico Mollo	Italy	Italy	38	
17	Glauco Servadei	Italy	Italy	20	
18	Jules Rossi	Italy	Italy	DNF	
19	Mario Vicini	Italy	Italy	6	
20	Giordano Cottur	Italy	Italy	25	
21	Augusto Introzzi	Italy	Italy	46	
22	Giuseppe Martano	Italy	Italy	27	
23	Settimio Simonini	Italy	Italy	DNF	
24	Nello Troggi	Italy	Italy	54	
25	Fritz Scheller	Germany	Germany	DNF	
26	Karl Seidel	Germany	Germany	DNF	
27	Fritz Ruland	Germany	Germany	DNF	
28	Herbert Hauswald	Germany	Germany	52	
29	Heinz Wengler	Germany	Germany	DNF	
30	Reinhold Wendel	Germany	Germany	53	
31	Jupp Arents	Germany	Germany	45	
32	Herman Schild	Germany	Germany	DNF	
33	Paul Langhoff	Germany	Germany	DNF	
34	Willi Oberbeck	Germany	Germany	DNF	
35	Karl Heide	Germany	Germany	DNF	
36	Otto Weckerling	Germany	Germany	21	
37	Antonin Magne	France	France	8	
38	Pierre Gallien	France	France	15	
39	Jean Fréchaut	France	France	18	
40	Auguste Mallet	France	France	DNF	
41	Marcel Laurent	France	France	DNF	
42	Pierre Jaminet	France	France	44	
43	Sylvain Marcaillou	France	France	DNF	
44	Georges Naisse	France	France	DNF	
45	Victor Cosson	France	France	3	
46	Georges Speicher	France	France	DNF	
47	Paul Maye	France	France	DNF	
48	Jean-Marie Goasmat	France	France	11	
49	Mariano Cañardo	Spain	Spain	16	
50	Julián Berrendero	Spain	Spain	29	
51	Rafael Ramos	Spain	Spain	19	
52	Jacques Alzine	Spain	Spain	DNF	
53	Emiliano Álvarez	Spain	Spain	DNF	
54	Antonio Prior	Spain	Spain	DNF	
55	Edgar Hehlen	Switzerland	Switzerland	DNF	
56	René Pedroli	Switzerland	Switzerland	DNF	
57	Paul Egli	Switzerland	Switzerland	31	
58	Theo Perret	Switzerland	Switzerland	DNF	
59	Bruno Besana	Switzerland	Switzerland	DNF	
60	Albert Knutti	Switzerland	Switzerland	DNF	
61	Piet van Nek	Netherlands	Netherlands	DNF	
62	Janus Hellemons	Netherlands	Netherlands	55	
63	Gerrit Schulte	Netherlands	Netherlands	DNF	
64	Jozef Dominicus	Netherlands	Netherlands	DNF	
65	Theo Middelkamp	Netherlands	Netherlands	43	
66	Antoon van Schendel	Netherlands	Netherlands	50	
67	Mathias Clemens	Luxembourg	Luxembourg	5	
68	Jean Majerus	Luxembourg	Luxembourg	49	
69	François Neuens	Luxembourg	Luxembourg	37	
70	Pierre Clemens	Luxembourg	Luxembourg	DNF	
71	Arsène Mersch	Luxembourg	Luxembourg	32	
72	Christophe Didier	Luxembourg	Luxembourg	DNF	
73	André Leducq	France	France - Cadets	30	
74	René Vietto	France	France - Cadets	DNF	
75	Raymond Louviot	France	France - Cadets	26	
76	Raoul Lesueur	France	France - Cadets	DNF	
77	Sauveur Ducazeaux	France	France - Cadets	DNF	
78	Fabien Galateau	France	France - Cadets	28	
79	Robert Tanneveau	France	France - Cadets	13	
80	Robert Oubron	France	France - Cadets	41	
81	Jean Fontenay	France	France - Cadets	24	
82	Yvan Marie	France	France - Cadets	23	
83	Raymond Passat	France	France - Cadets	22	
84	Bruno Carini	France	France - Cadets	47	
85	Lucien Le Guével	France	France - Bleuets	36	
86	Oreste Bernardoni	France	France - Bleuets	40	
87	Albert Bourlon	France	France - Bleuets	35	
88	André Deforge	France	France - Bleuets	DNF	
89	Joseph Goutorbe	France	France - Bleuets	DNF	
90	Dante Gianello	France	France - Bleuets	10	
91	Eloi Tassin	France	France - Bleuets	DNF	
92	Camille Leroy	France	France - Bleuets	42	
93	Pierre Spapperi	France	France - Bleuets	DNF	
94	Gaston Grimbert	France	France - Bleuets	DNF	
95	Lucien Lamure	France	France - Bleuets	DNF	
96	Charles Bouvet	France	France - Bleuets	DNF	
