= 1938 Tour de France, Stage 1 to Stage 10c =

Cycling race stages

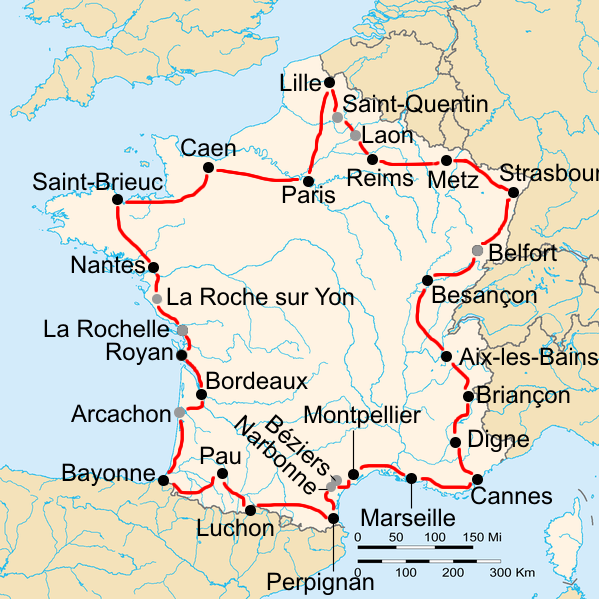
Route of the 1938 Tour de France

The 1938 Tour de France was the 32nd edition of the Tour de France, one of cycling's Grand Tours. The Tour began in Paris with a flat stage on 5 July, and Stage 10c occurred on 17 July with a flat stage to Montpellier. The race finished in Paris on 31 July.

== Stage 1 ==
5 July 1938 – Paris to Caen, 215 km (134 mi)

Stage 1 result and general classification after stage 1

Rank	Rider	Team	Time
1	Willi Oberbeck (GER)	Germany	6h 38' 25"
2	Aldo Bini (ITA)	Italy	+ 10"
3	Theo Middelkamp (NED)	Netherlands	s.t.
4	Marcel Kint (BEL)	Belgium	s.t.
5	Otto Weckerling (GER)	Germany	s.t.
6	François Neuville (BEL)	Belgium	+ 30"
7	André Leducq (FRA)	France - Cadets	s.t.
8	Gerrit Schulte (NED)	Netherlands	+ 38"
9	Antonin Magne (FRA)	France	s.t.
10	Giuseppe Martano (ITA)	Italy	s.t.

== Stage 2 ==
6 July 1938 – Caen to Saint-Brieuc, 237 km (147 mi)

Stage 2 result

Rank	Rider	Team	Time
1	Jean Majerus (LUX)	Luxembourg	7h 01' 07"
2	Jean-Marie Goasmat (FRA)	France	s.t.
3	Otto Weckerling (GER)	Germany	s.t.
4	Georges Speicher (FRA)	France	s.t.
=5	Antonin Magne (FRA)	France	s.t.
=5	Heinz Wengler (GER)	Germany	s.t.
=5	André Leducq (FRA)	France - Cadets	s.t.
=5	Victor Cosson (FRA)	France	s.t.
=5	Jules Lowie (BEL)	Belgium	s.t.
=5	Mathias Clemens (LUX)	Luxembourg	s.t.

General classification after stage 2

Rank	Rider	Team	Time
1	Jean Majerus (LUX)	Luxembourg	
2	Otto Weckerling (GER)	Germany	+ 32"
3	André Leducq (FRA)	France - Cadets	+ 52"
4			
5			
6			
7			
8			
9			
10			

== Stage 3 ==
7 July 1938 – Saint-Brieuc to Nantes, 238 km (148 mi)

Stage 3 result

Rank	Rider	Team	Time
1	Gerrit Schulte (NED)	Netherlands	7h 39' 01"
2	Éloi Meulenberg (BEL)	Belgium	+ 5"
3	Paul Egli (SUI)	Switzerland	+ 9"
4	Heinz Wengler (GER)	Germany	s.t.
5	Theo Middelkamp (NED)	Netherlands	s.t.
6	Glauco Servadei (ITA)	Italy	s.t.
7	Edward Vissers (BEL)	Belgium	s.t.
8	Settimio Simonini (ITA)	Italy	s.t.
9	Eloi Tassin (FRA)	France - Bleuets	s.t.
10	Jean-Marie Goasmat (FRA)	France	s.t.

General classification after stage 3

Rank	Rider	Team	Time
1	Jean Majerus (LUX)	Luxembourg	
2	Otto Weckerling (GER)	Germany	+ 32"
3	André Leducq (FRA)	France - Cadets	+ 52"
4			
5			
6			
7			
8			
9			
10			

== Stage 4a ==
8 July 1938 – Nantes to La Roche-sur-Yon, 62 km (39 mi)

Stage 4a result

Rank	Rider	Team	Time
1	Éloi Meulenberg (BEL)	Belgium	2h 04' 49"
2	Glauco Servadei (ITA)	Italy	s.t.
3	Aldo Bini (ITA)	Italy	s.t.
4	François Neuville (BEL)	Belgium	s.t.
5	Heinz Wengler (GER)	Germany	s.t.
6	Jules Rossi (ITA)	Italy	s.t.
7	Giuseppe Martano (ITA)	Italy	s.t.
8	Jules Lowie (BEL)	Belgium	s.t.
9	Jean Fréchaut (FRA)	France	s.t.
10	Sylvère Maes (BEL)	Belgium	s.t.

General classification after stage 4a

Rank	Rider	Team	Time
1	Jean Majerus (LUX)	Luxembourg	
2	Otto Weckerling (GER)	Germany	+ 32"
3	André Leducq (FRA)	France - Cadets	+ 52"
4			
5			
6			
7			
8			
9			
10			

== Stage 4b ==
8 July 1938 – La Roche-sur-Yon to La Rochelle, 83 km (52 mi)

Stage 4b result

Rank	Rider	Team	Time
1	Éloi Meulenberg (BEL)	Belgium	2h 34' 20"
2	Glauco Servadei (ITA)	Italy	s.t.
3	Oreste Bernardoni (FRA)	France - Bleuets	s.t.
4	Jean Fréchaut (FRA)	France	s.t.
5	François Neuens (LUX)	Luxembourg	s.t.
=6	Sylvère Maes (BEL)	Belgium	s.t.
=6	Marcel Kint (BEL)	Belgium	s.t.
=6	Félicien Vervaecke (BEL)	Belgium	s.t.
=6	Albertin Disseaux (BEL)	Belgium	s.t.
=6	Émile Masson Jr. (BEL)	Belgium	s.t.

General classification after stage 4b

Rank	Rider	Team	Time
1	Jean Majerus (LUX)	Luxembourg	
2	Otto Weckerling (GER)	Germany	+ 32"
3	André Leducq (FRA)	France - Cadets	+ 52"
4			
5			
6			
7			
8			
9			
10			

== Stage 4c ==
8 July 1938 – La Rochelle to Royan, 83 km (52 mi)

Stage 4c result

Rank	Rider	Team	Time
1	Félicien Vervaecke (BEL)	Belgium	2h 32' 13"
2	Janus Hellemons (NED)	Netherlands	+ 18"
3	Glauco Servadei (ITA)	Italy	+ 32"
4	Aldo Bini (ITA)	Italy	s.t.
=5	Sylvère Maes (BEL)	Belgium	s.t.
=5	Marcel Kint (BEL)	Belgium	s.t.
=5	Albertin Disseaux (BEL)	Belgium	s.t.
=5	Éloi Meulenberg (BEL)	Belgium	s.t.
=5	Émile Masson Jr. (BEL)	Belgium	s.t.
=5	Jules Lowie (BEL)	Belgium	s.t.

General classification after stage 4c

Rank	Rider	Team	Time
1	Jean Majerus (LUX)	Luxembourg	
2	Otto Weckerling (GER)	Germany	+ 32"
3	André Leducq (FRA)	France - Cadets	+ 52"
4			
5			
6			
7			
8			
9			
10			

== Rest day 1 ==
9 July 1938 – Royan

== Stage 5 ==
10 July 1938 – Royan to Bordeaux, 198 km (123 mi)

Stage 5 result

Rank	Rider	Team	Time
1	Éloi Meulenberg (BEL)	Belgium	5h 12' 42"
2	Glauco Servadei (ITA)	Italy	s.t.
3	Aldo Bini (ITA)	Italy	s.t.
4	Jean Fréchaut (FRA)	France	s.t.
=5	Sylvère Maes (BEL)	Belgium	s.t.
=5	Marcel Kint (BEL)	Belgium	s.t.
=5	Félicien Vervaecke (BEL)	Belgium	s.t.
=5	Albertin Disseaux (BEL)	Belgium	s.t.
=5	Émile Masson Jr. (BEL)	Belgium	s.t.
=5	Jules Lowie (BEL)	Belgium	s.t.

General classification after stage 5

Rank	Rider	Team	Time
1	Jean Majerus (LUX)	Luxembourg	
2	André Leducq (FRA)	France - Cadets	+ 52"
=3	Antonin Magne (FRA)	France	+ 1' 00"
=3	Mathias Clemens (LUX)	Luxembourg	s.t.
5			
6			
7			
8			
9			
10			

== Stage 6a ==
11 July 1938 – Bordeaux to Arcachon, 53 km (33 mi)

Stage 6a result

Rank	Rider	Team	Time
1	Jules Rossi (ITA)	Italy	1h 16' 20"
2	Giordano Cottur (ITA)	Italy	s.t.
3	Georges Naisse (FRA)	France	s.t.
4	Lucien Le Guével (FRA)	France - Bleuets	s.t.
5	Robert Tanneveau (FRA)	France - Cadets	s.t.
6	Dante Gianello (FRA)	France - Bleuets	s.t.
7	Pierre Gallien (FRA)	France	+ 2' 02"
8	Glauco Servadei (ITA)	Italy	+ 3' 38"
9	Enrico Mollo (ITA)	Italy	s.t.
10	Antonin Magne (FRA)	France	s.t.

General classification after stage 6a

Rank	Rider	Team	Time
1	Jean Majerus (LUX)	Luxembourg	
2	André Leducq (FRA)	France - Cadets	+ 52"
3	Antonin Magne (FRA)	France	+ 1' 00"
4			
5			
6			
7			
8			
9			
10			

== Stage 6b ==
11 July 1938 – Arcachon to Bayonne, 171 km (106 mi)

Stage 6b result

Rank	Rider	Team	Time
1	Glauco Servadei (ITA)	Italy	5h 06' 34"
2	Jules Rossi (ITA)	Italy	s.t.
3	Heinz Wengler (GER)	Germany	s.t.
4	Raoul Lesueur (FRA)	France - Cadets	s.t.
5	André Leducq (FRA)	France - Cadets	s.t.
6	Giuseppe Martano (ITA)	Italy	s.t.
7	Aldo Bini (ITA)	Italy	+ 1' 40"
8	Paul Langhoff (GER)	Germany	s.t.
9	Pierre Jaminet (FRA)	France	s.t.
10	Giordano Cottur (ITA)	Italy	s.t.

General classification after stage 6b

Rank	Rider	Team	Time
1	André Leducq (FRA)	France - Cadets	
2	Heinz Wengler (GER)	Germany	+ 26"
3	Jean Majerus (LUX)	Luxembourg	+ 48"
4			
5			
6			
7			
8			
9			
10			

== Stage 7 ==
12 July 1938 – Bayonne to Pau, 115 km (71 mi)

Stage 7 result

Rank	Rider	Team	Time
1	Theo Middelkamp (NED)	Netherlands	2h 51' 22"
2	Heinz Wengler (GER)	Germany	s.t.
3	Edward Vissers (BEL)	Belgium	s.t.
4	Julián Berrendero (ESP)	Spain	+ 11"
5	Jean Fréchaut (FRA)	France	+ 13"
6	Aldo Bini (ITA)	Italy	s.t.
=7	Sylvère Maes (BEL)	Belgium	s.t.
=7	Marcel Kint (BEL)	Belgium	s.t.
=7	Félicien Vervaecke (BEL)	Belgium	s.t.
=7	Albertin Disseaux (BEL)	Belgium	s.t.

General classification after stage 7

Rank	Rider	Team	Time
1	André Leducq (FRA)	France - Cadets	
2	Heinz Wengler (GER)	Germany	+ 13"
3	Jean Majerus (LUX)	Luxembourg	+ 48"
4			
5			
6			
7			
8			
9			
10			

== Rest day 2 ==
13 July 1938 –- Pau

== Stage 8 ==
14 July 1938 – Pau to Luchon, 193 km (120 mi)

Stage 8 result

Rank	Rider	Team	Time
1	Félicien Vervaecke (BEL)	Belgium	7h 15' 19"
2	Edward Vissers (BEL)	Belgium	s.t.
3	Gino Bartali (ITA)	Italy	+ 55"
4	Jean-Marie Goasmat (FRA)	France	+ 4' 12"
5	Albertin Disseaux (BEL)	Belgium	+ 6' 04"
6	Victor Cosson (FRA)	France	+ 8' 05"
7	Dante Gianello (FRA)	France - Bleuets	+ 8' 56"
8	Fabien Galateau (FRA)	France - Cadets	+ 9' 11"
9	Arsène Mersch (LUX)	Luxembourg	+ 10' 14"
10	Settimio Simonini (ITA)	Italy	+ 11' 31"

General classification after stage 8

Rank	Rider	Team	Time
1	Félicien Vervaecke (BEL)	Belgium	
2	Gino Bartali (ITA)	Italy	+ 2' 18"
3	Jean-Marie Goasmat (FRA)	France	+ 5' 09"
4			
5			
6			
7			
8			
9			
10			

== Rest day 3 ==
15 July 1938 – Luchon

== Stage 9 ==
16 July 1938 – Luchon to Perpignan, 260 km (160 mi)

Stage 9 result

Rank	Rider	Team	Time
1	Jean Fréchaut (FRA)	France	7h 08' 15"
2	Enrico Mollo (ITA)	Italy	s.t.
3	Antonin Magne (FRA)	France	+ 50"
4	Julián Berrendero (ESP)	Spain	s.t.
5	Jules Lowie (BEL)	Belgium	s.t.
6	Antoon van Schendel (NED)	Netherlands	+ 2' 17"
7	Yvan Marie (FRA)	France - Cadets	s.t.
8	Glauco Servadei (ITA)	Italy	+ 2' 47"
9	Constant Lauwers (BEL)	Belgium	s.t.
10	Gino Bartali (ITA)	Italy	s.t.

General classification after stage 9

Rank	Rider	Team	Time
1	Félicien Vervaecke (BEL)	Belgium	
2	Gino Bartali (ITA)	Italy	+ 53"
3	Jean-Marie Goasmat (FRA)	France	+ 5' 09"
4			
5			
6			
7			
8			
9			
10			

== Stage 10a ==
17 July 1938 – Perpignan to Narbonne, 63 km (39 mi)

Stage 10a result

Rank	Rider	Team	Time
1	Antoon van Schendel (NED)	Netherlands	1h 56' 09"
2	Aldo Bini (ITA)	Italy	+ 9"
3	Félicien Vervaecke (BEL)	Belgium	s.t.
4	Jules Rossi (ITA)	Italy	s.t.
5	Pierre Jaminet (FRA)	France	s.t.
6	Glauco Servadei (ITA)	Italy	s.t.
7	Mario Vicini (ITA)	Italy	s.t.
8	Yvan Marie (FRA)	France - Cadets	s.t.
=9	Sylvère Maes (BEL)	Belgium	s.t.
=9	Marcel Kint (BEL)	Belgium	s.t.

General classification after stage 10a

Rank	Rider	Team	Time
1	Félicien Vervaecke (BEL)	Belgium	
2	Gino Bartali (ITA)	Italy	+ 53"
3	Jean-Marie Goasmat (FRA)	France	+ 5' 09"
4			
5			
6			
7			
8			
9			
10			

== Stage 10b ==
17 July 1938 – Narbonne to Béziers, 27 km (17 mi) (ITT)

Stage 10b result

Rank	Rider	Team	Time
1	Félicien Vervaecke (BEL)	Belgium	39' 31"
2	Mario Vicini (ITA)	Italy	+ 35"
3	Mathias Clemens (LUX)	Luxembourg	+ 40"
4	Antonin Magne (FRA)	France	+ 49"
5	Edward Vissers (BEL)	Belgium	+ 1' 04"
6	Giordano Cottur (ITA)	Italy	+ 1' 06"
7	Settimio Simonini (ITA)	Italy	+ 1' 18"
=8	Raoul Lesueur (FRA)	France - Cadets	+ 1' 25"
=8	Arsène Mersch (LUX)	Luxembourg	s.t.
10	Yvan Marie (FRA)	France - Cadets	+ 1' 27"

General classification after stage 10b

Rank	Rider	Team	Time
1	Félicien Vervaecke (BEL)	Belgium	
2	Gino Bartali (ITA)	Italy	+ 3' 45"
3	Edward Vissers (BEL)	Belgium	+ 7' 46"
4			
5			
6			
7			
8			
9			
10			

== Stage 10c ==
17 July 1938 – Béziers to Montpellier, 73 km (45 mi)

Stage 10c result

Rank	Rider	Team	Time
1	Antonin Magne (FRA)	France	2h 06' 23"
2	Constant Lauwers (BEL)	Belgium	s.t.
3	Arsène Mersch (LUX)	Luxembourg	s.t.
4	Yvan Marie (FRA)	France - Cadets	s.t.
5	Mathias Clemens (LUX)	Luxembourg	s.t.
6	Pierre Clemens (LUX)	Luxembourg	s.t.
7	Fabien Galateau (FRA)	France - Cadets	s.t.
8	Robert Tanneveau (FRA)	France - Cadets	s.t.
9	Antoon van Schendel (NED)	Netherlands	s.t.
10	Jean Fontenay (FRA)	France - Cadets	+ 1' 09"

General classification after stage 10c

Rank	Rider	Team	Time
1	Félicien Vervaecke (BEL)	Belgium	
2	Gino Bartali (ITA)	Italy	+ 3' 45"
3	Edward Vissers (BEL)	Belgium	+ 7' 46"
4			
5			
6			
7			
8			
9			
10			
