= 1938 Tour de France, Stage 11 to Stage 21 =

Cycling race stages

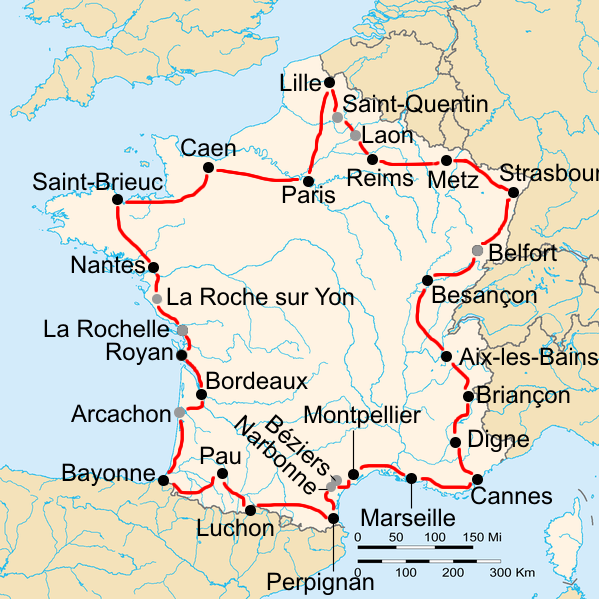
Route of the 1938 Tour de France

The 1938 Tour de France was the 32nd edition of the Tour de France, one of cycling's Grand Tours. The Tour began in Paris with a flat stage on 5 July, and Stage 11 occurred on 18 July with a flat stage from Montpellier. The race finished in Paris on 31 July.

== Stage 11 ==
18 July 1938 - Montpellier to Marseille, 223 km (139 mi)

Stage 11 result

| Rank | Rider | Team | Time |
|---|---|---|---|
| 1 | Gino Bartali (ITA) | Italy | 6h 52' 10" |
| 2 | Félicien Vervaecke (BEL) | Belgium | s.t. |
| 3 | André Leducq (FRA) | France - Cadets | s.t. |
| 4 | Antonin Magne (FRA) | France | s.t. |
| 5 | Vasco Bergamaschi (ITA) | Italy | s.t. |
| 6 | Yvan Marie (FRA) | France - Cadets | s.t. |
| =7 | Jules Lowie (BEL) | Belgium | s.t. |
| =7 | François Neuville (BEL) | Belgium | s.t. |
| =7 | Mario Vicini (ITA) | Italy | s.t. |
| =7 | Jean Fréchaut (FRA) | France | s.t. |

General classification after stage 11

| Rank | Rider | Team | Time |
|---|---|---|---|
| 1 | Félicien Vervaecke (BEL) | Belgium | |
| 2 | Gino Bartali (ITA) | Italy | + 2' 45" |
| 3 | Edward Vissers (BEL) | Belgium | + 11' 34" |
| 4 | | | |
| 5 | | | |
| 6 | | | |
| 7 | | | |
| 8 | | | |
| 9 | | | |
| 10 | | | |

== Stage 12 ==
19 July 1938 - Marseille to Cannes, 199 km (124 mi)

Stage 12 result

| Rank | Rider | Team | Time |
|---|---|---|---|
| 1 | Jean Fréchaut (FRA) | France | 6h 35' 26" |
| 2 | Yvan Marie (FRA) | France - Cadets | s.t. |
| 3 | André Leducq (FRA) | France - Cadets | s.t. |
| 4 | Mario Vicini (ITA) | Italy | s.t. |
| =5 | Auguste Mallet (FRA) | France | s.t. |
| =5 | Victor Cosson (FRA) | France | s.t. |
| =5 | Mariano Cañardo (ESP) | Spain | s.t. |
| =5 | Mathias Clemens (LUX) | Luxembourg | s.t. |
| =5 | Robert Tanneveau (FRA) | France - Cadets | s.t. |
| =5 | Jean Fontenay (FRA) | France - Cadets | s.t. |

General classification after stage 12

| Rank | Rider | Team | Time |
|---|---|---|---|
| 1 | Félicien Vervaecke (BEL) | Belgium | |
| 2 | Gino Bartali (ITA) | Italy | + 2' 45" |
| 3 | Victor Cosson (FRA) | France | + 8' 45" |
| 4 | | | |
| 5 | | | |
| 6 | | | |
| 7 | | | |
| 8 | | | |
| 9 | | | |
| 10 | | | |

== Rest day 4 ==
20 July 1938 - Cannes

== Stage 13 ==
21 July 1938 - Cannes to Digne, 284 km (176 mi)

Stage 13 result

| Rank | Rider | Team | Time |
|---|---|---|---|
| 1 | Dante Gianello (FRA) | France - Bleuets | 9h 19' 49" |
| 2 | Jean-Marie Goasmat (FRA) | France | s.t. |
| 3 | François Neuville (BEL) | Belgium | + 1' 21" |
| 4 | Auguste Mallet (FRA) | France | s.t. |
| 5 | Mario Vicini (ITA) | Italy | s.t. |
| 6 | Otto Weckerling (GER) | Germany | + 2' 51" |
| 7 | Mathias Clemens (LUX) | Luxembourg | + 3' 45" |
| 8 | Jean Fontenay (FRA) | France - Cadets | + 4' 03" |
| 9 | Theo Middelkamp (NED) | Netherlands | + 5' 11" |
| 10 | Pierre Gallien (FRA) | France | s.t. |

General classification after stage 13

| Rank | Rider | Team | Time |
|---|---|---|---|
| 1 | Félicien Vervaecke (BEL) | Belgium | |
| 2 | Gino Bartali (ITA) | Italy | + 1' 15" |
| 3 | Mathias Clemens (LUX) | Luxembourg | + 6' 29" |
| 4 | | | |
| 5 | | | |
| 6 | | | |
| 7 | | | |
| 8 | | | |
| 9 | | | |
| 10 | | | |

== Stage 14 ==
22 July 1938 - Digne to Briançon, 219 km (136 mi)

Stage 14 result

| Rank | Rider | Team | Time |
|---|---|---|---|
| 1 | Gino Bartali (ITA) | Italy | 8h 49' 07" |
| 2 | Mario Vicini (ITA) | Italy | + 5' 18" |
| 3 | Mathias Clemens (LUX) | Luxembourg | + 6' 48" |
| 4 | Glauco Servadei (ITA) | Italy | + 11' 18" |
| 5 | Enrico Mollo (ITA) | Italy | + 11' 25" |
| 6 | Giuseppe Martano (ITA) | Italy | + 15' 01" |
| 7 | Pierre Gallien (FRA) | France | + 16' 13" |
| 8 | Victor Cosson (FRA) | France | s.t. |
| 9 | Jules Lowie (BEL) | Belgium | + 17' 22" |
| 10 | Félicien Vervaecke (BEL) | Belgium | s.t. |

General classification after stage 14

| Rank | Rider | Team | Time |
|---|---|---|---|
| 1 | Gino Bartali (ITA) | Italy | |
| 2 | Mathias Clemens (LUX) | Luxembourg | + 17' 45" |
| 3 | Félicien Vervaecke (BEL) | Belgium | + 21' 30" |
| 4 | | | |
| 5 | | | |
| 6 | | | |
| 7 | | | |
| 8 | | | |
| 9 | | | |
| 10 | | | |

== Stage 15 ==
23 July 1938 - Briançon to Aix-les-Bains, 311 km (193 mi)

Stage 15 result

| Rank | Rider | Team | Time |
|---|---|---|---|
| 1 | Marcel Kint (BEL) | Belgium | 10h 52' 24" |
| 2 | Jules Lowie (BEL) | Belgium | + 12" |
| 3 | Gino Bartali (ITA) | Italy | s.t. |
| 4 | Victor Cosson (FRA) | France | s.t. |
| 5 | Edward Vissers (BEL) | Belgium | s.t. |
| 6 | Sylvère Maes (BEL) | Belgium | s.t. |
| 7 | Jean Fontenay (FRA) | France - Cadets | s.t. |
| 8 | Félicien Vervaecke (BEL) | Belgium | s.t. |
| 9 | Antonin Magne (FRA) | France | + 15' 43" |
| 10 | François Neuville (BEL) | Belgium | s.t. |

General classification after stage 15

| Rank | Rider | Team | Time |
|---|---|---|---|
| 1 | Gino Bartali (ITA) | Italy | |
| 2 | Félicien Vervaecke (BEL) | Belgium | + 20' 02" |
| 3 | Victor Cosson (FRA) | France | + 28' 56" |
| 4 | | | |
| 5 | | | |
| 6 | | | |
| 7 | | | |
| 8 | | | |
| 9 | | | |
| 10 | | | |

== Rest day 5 ==
24 July 1938 - Aix-les-Bains

== Stage 16 ==
25 July 1938 - Aix-les-Bains to Besançon, 284 km (176 mi)

Stage 16 result

| Rank | Rider | Team | Time |
|---|---|---|---|
| 1 | Marcel Kint (BEL) | Belgium | 9h 39' 56" |
| 2 | Yvan Marie (FRA) | France - Cadets | s.t. |
| 3 | Albertin Disseaux (BEL) | Belgium | s.t. |
| 4 | Oreste Bernardoni (FRA) | France - Bleuets | s.t. |
| 5 | Paul Egli (SUI) | Switzerland | + 1' 30" |
| 6 | Sylvère Maes (BEL) | Belgium | s.t. |
| 7 | Arsène Mersch (LUX) | Luxembourg | s.t. |
| 8 | Antoon van Schendel (NED) | Netherlands | s.t. |
| 9 | Raymond Louviot (FRA) | France - Cadets | s.t. |
| 10 | Robert Tanneveau (FRA) | France - Cadets | s.t. |

General classification after stage 16

| Rank | Rider | Team | Time |
|---|---|---|---|
| 1 | Gino Bartali (ITA) | Italy | |
| 2 | Félicien Vervaecke (BEL) | Belgium | + 21' 17" |
| 3 | Victor Cosson (FRA) | France | + 30' 11" |
| 4 | | | |
| 5 | | | |
| 6 | | | |
| 7 | | | |
| 8 | | | |
| 9 | | | |
| 10 | | | |

== Stage 17a ==
26 July 1938 - Besançon to Belfort, 89 km (55 mi)

Stage 17a result

| Rank | Rider | Team | Time |
|---|---|---|---|
| 1 | Émile Masson Jr. (BEL) | Belgium | 2h 27' 48" |
| 2 | Otto Weckerling (GER) | Germany | s.t. |
| 3 | Jean Fréchaut (FRA) | France | + 2' 08" |
| 4 | Lucien Le Guével (FRA) | France - Bleuets | s.t. |
| 5 | Paul Egli (SUI) | Switzerland | s.t. |
| 6 | Robert Tanneveau (FRA) | France - Cadets | s.t. |
| 7 | François Neuens (LUX) | Luxembourg | + 3' 01" |
| 8 | Raymond Louviot (FRA) | France - Cadets | s.t. |
| 9 | Jean Majerus (LUX) | Luxembourg | s.t. |
| 10 | Constant Lauwers (BEL) | Belgium | + 5' 59" |

General classification after stage 17a

| Rank | Rider | Team | Time |
|---|---|---|---|
| 1 | Gino Bartali (ITA) | Italy | |
| 2 | Félicien Vervaecke (BEL) | Belgium | + 21' 17" |
| 3 | Victor Cosson (FRA) | France | + 30' 11" |
| 4 | | | |
| 5 | | | |
| 6 | | | |
| 7 | | | |
| 8 | | | |
| 9 | | | |
| 10 | | | |

== Stage 17b ==
26 July 1938 - Belfort to Strasbourg, 143 km (89 mi)

Stage 17b result

| Rank | Rider | Team | Time |
|---|---|---|---|
| 1 | Jean Fréchaut (FRA) | France | 4h 30' 20" |
| 2 | Constant Lauwers (BEL) | Belgium | s.t. |
| 3 | Jean Majerus (LUX) | Luxembourg | s.t. |
| 4 | Oreste Bernardoni (FRA) | France - Bleuets | s.t. |
| 5 | Otto Weckerling (GER) | Germany | s.t. |
| 6 | Émile Masson Jr. (BEL) | Belgium | s.t. |
| 7 | Jean-Marie Goasmat (FRA) | France | s.t. |
| 8 | Jupp Arents (GER) | Germany | s.t. |
| 9 | Rafael Ramos (ESP) | Spain | s.t. |
| 10 | Robert Tanneveau (FRA) | France - Cadets | s.t. |

General classification after stage 17b

| Rank | Rider | Team | Time |
|---|---|---|---|
| 1 | Gino Bartali (ITA) | Italy | |
| 2 | Félicien Vervaecke (BEL) | Belgium | + 21' 17" |
| 3 | Victor Cosson (FRA) | France | + 30' 11" |
| 4 | | | |
| 5 | | | |
| 6 | | | |
| 7 | | | |
| 8 | | | |
| 9 | | | |
| 10 | | | |

== Stage 18 ==
27 July 1938 - Strasbourg to Metz, 186 km (116 mi)

Stage 18 result

| Rank | Rider | Team | Time |
|---|---|---|---|
| 1 | Marcel Kint (BEL) | Belgium | 5h 43' 27" |
| 2 | Lucien Le Guével (FRA) | France - Bleuets | s.t. |
| 3 | André Leducq (FRA) | France - Cadets | s.t. |
| 4 | Mathias Clemens (LUX) | Luxembourg | s.t. |
| 5 | Jean Fontenay (FRA) | France - Cadets | s.t. |
| 6 | Arsène Mersch (LUX) | Luxembourg | + 13" |
| 7 | Glauco Servadei (ITA) | Italy | s.t. |
| 8 | Paul Egli (SUI) | Switzerland | s.t. |
| 9 | Jean Fréchaut (FRA) | France | s.t. |
| 10 | Sylvère Maes (BEL) | Belgium | s.t. |

General classification after stage 18

| Rank | Rider | Team | Time |
|---|---|---|---|
| 1 | Gino Bartali (ITA) | Italy | |
| 2 | Félicien Vervaecke (BEL) | Belgium | + 21' 17" |
| 3 | Victor Cosson (FRA) | France | + 30' 11" |
| 4 | | | |
| 5 | | | |
| 6 | | | |
| 7 | | | |
| 8 | | | |
| 9 | | | |
| 10 | | | |

== Stage 19 ==
28 July 1938 - Metz to Reims, 196 km (122 mi)

Stage 19 result

| Rank | Rider | Team | Time |
|---|---|---|---|
| 1 | Fabien Galateau (FRA) | France - Cadets | 6h 35' 21" |
| 2 | Lucien Le Guével (FRA) | France - Bleuets | s.t. |
| 3 | Bruno Carini (FRA) | France - Cadets | s.t. |
| 4 | Paul Egli (SUI) | Switzerland | + 36" |
| 5 | François Neuens (LUX) | Luxembourg | s.t. |
| 6 | Raymond Louviot (FRA) | France - Cadets | s.t. |
| 7 | André Leducq (FRA) | France - Cadets | s.t. |
| 8 | Julián Berrendero (ESP) | Spain | s.t. |
| 9 | Yvan Marie (FRA) | France - Cadets | s.t. |
| 10 | Arsène Mersch (LUX) | Luxembourg | s.t. |

General classification after stage 19

| Rank | Rider | Team | Time |
|---|---|---|---|
| 1 | Gino Bartali (ITA) | Italy | |
| 2 | Félicien Vervaecke (BEL) | Belgium | + 21' 17" |
| 3 | Victor Cosson (FRA) | France | + 30' 11" |
| 4 | | | |
| 5 | | | |
| 6 | | | |
| 7 | | | |
| 8 | | | |
| 9 | | | |
| 10 | | | |

== Rest day 6 ==
29 July 1938 - Reims

== Stage 20a ==
30 July 1938 - Reims to Laon, 48 km (30 mi)

Stage 20a result

| Rank | Rider | Team | Time |
|---|---|---|---|
| 1 | Glauco Servadei (ITA) | Italy | 1h 03' 17" |
| 2 | Aldo Bini (ITA) | Italy | s.t. |
| 3 | François Neuville (BEL) | Belgium | s.t. |
| 4 | Jean Fréchaut (FRA) | France | s.t. |
| 5 | Lucien Le Guével (FRA) | France - Bleuets | s.t. |
| 6 | Vasco Bergamaschi (ITA) | Italy | s.t. |
| 7 | Paul Egli (SUI) | Switzerland | s.t. |
| 8 | Janus Hellemons (NED) | Netherlands | s.t. |
| 9 | Enrico Mollo (ITA) | Italy | s.t. |
| 10 | Oreste Bernardoni (FRA) | France - Bleuets | s.t. |

General classification after stage 20a

| Rank | Rider | Team | Time |
|---|---|---|---|
| 1 | Gino Bartali (ITA) | Italy | |
| 2 | Félicien Vervaecke (BEL) | Belgium | + 21' 17" |
| 3 | Victor Cosson (FRA) | France | + 30' 11" |
| 4 | | | |
| 5 | | | |
| 6 | | | |
| 7 | | | |
| 8 | | | |
| 9 | | | |
| 10 | | | |

== Stage 20b ==
30 July 1938 - Laon to Saint-Quentin, 42 km (26 mi) (ITT)

Stage 20b result

| Rank | Rider | Team | Time |
|---|---|---|---|
| 1 | Félicien Vervaecke (BEL) | Belgium | 1h 04' 40" |
| 2 | Edward Vissers (BEL) | Belgium | + 21" |
| 3 | Victor Cosson (FRA) | France | s.t. |
| 4 | Giordano Cottur (ITA) | Italy | + 32" |
| 5 | Sylvère Maes (BEL) | Belgium | + 1' 18" |
| 6 | Jules Lowie (BEL) | Belgium | + 1' 39" |
| 7 | Arsène Mersch (LUX) | Luxembourg | + 1' 43" |
| 8 | Gino Bartali (ITA) | Italy | + 1' 50" |
| 9 | Jean Fréchaut (FRA) | France | + 1' 55" |
| 10 | Robert Tanneveau (FRA) | France - Cadets | + 1' 57" |

General classification after stage 20b

| Rank | Rider | Team | Time |
|---|---|---|---|
| 1 | Gino Bartali (ITA) | Italy | |
| 2 | Félicien Vervaecke (BEL) | Belgium | + 18' 27" |
| 3 | Victor Cosson (FRA) | France | + 29' 26" |
| 4 | | | |
| 5 | | | |
| 6 | | | |
| 7 | | | |
| 8 | | | |
| 9 | | | |
| 10 | | | |

== Stage 20c ==
30 July 1938 - Saint-Quentin to Lille, 107 km (66 mi)

Stage 20c result

| Rank | Rider | Team | Time |
|---|---|---|---|
| 1 | François Neuville (BEL) | Belgium | 3h 07' 12" |
| 2 | Jean Fréchaut (FRA) | France | + 1' 19" |
| 3 | Constant Lauwers (BEL) | Belgium | s.t. |
| 4 | Jean Majerus (LUX) | Luxembourg | + 5' 09" |
| 5 | Aldo Bini (ITA) | Italy | + 7' 25" |
| 6 | Glauco Servadei (ITA) | Italy | s.t. |
| 7 | Pierre Jaminet (FRA) | France | s.t. |
| 8 | André Leducq (FRA) | France - Cadets | s.t. |
| 9 | Paul Egli (SUI) | Switzerland | s.t. |
| 10 | Sylvère Maes (BEL) | Belgium | s.t. |

General classification after stage 20c

| Rank | Rider | Team | Time |
|---|---|---|---|
| 1 | Gino Bartali (ITA) | Italy | |
| 2 | Félicien Vervaecke (BEL) | Belgium | + 18' 27" |
| 3 | Victor Cosson (FRA) | France | + 29' 26" |
| 4 | | | |
| 5 | | | |
| 6 | | | |
| 7 | | | |
| 8 | | | |
| 9 | | | |
| 10 | | | |

== Stage 21 ==
31 July 1938 - Lille to Paris, 279 km (173 mi)

Stage 21 result

| Rank | Rider | Team | Time |
|---|---|---|---|
| =1 | Antonin Magne (FRA) | France | 8h 54' 50" |
| =1 | André Leducq (FRA) | France - Cadets | s.t. |
| 3 | Raymond Louviot (FRA) | France - Cadets | + 5' 00" |
| 4 | Fabien Galateau (FRA) | France - Cadets | s.t. |
| 5 | Pierre Jaminet (FRA) | France | s.t. |
| 6 | Yvan Marie (FRA) | France - Cadets | s.t. |
| 7 | Mario Vicini (ITA) | Italy | + 5' 15" |
| 8 | Marcel Kint (BEL) | Belgium | s.t. |
| 9 | Robert Oubron (FRA) | France - Cadets | s.t. |
| 10 | Mariano Cañardo (ESP) | Spain | s.t. |

General classification after stage 21

| Rank | Rider | Team | Time |
|---|---|---|---|
| 1 | Gino Bartali (ITA) | Italy | 148h 29' 12" |
| 2 | Félicien Vervaecke (BEL) | Belgium | + 18' 27" |
| 3 | Victor Cosson (FRA) | France | + 29' 26" |
| 4 | Edward Vissers (BEL) | Belgium | + 35' 08" |
| 5 | Mathias Clemens (LUX) | Luxembourg | + 42' 08" |
| 6 | Mario Vicini (ITA) | Italy | + 44' 59" |
| 7 | Jules Lowie (BEL) | Belgium | + 48' 56" |
| 8 | Antonin Magne (FRA) | France | + 49' 00" |
| 9 | Marcel Kint (BEL) | Belgium | + 59' 49" |
| 10 | Dante Gianello (FRA) | France - Bleuets | + 1h 06' 47" |
