= 1938 Tour of Flanders =

Race details
- Dates: 10 April 1938
- Stages: 1
- Distance: 260 km (161.6 mi)
- Winning time: 7h 42' 00"

Results
	Winner	Edgard De Caluwé (BEL)
	Second	Sylvère Maes (BEL)
	Third	Marcel Kint (BEL)

The 22nd edition of the Tour of Flanders cycling classic race was held on Sunday, 10 April 1938. Belgian Edgard de Caluwé won the Monument. Of the 180 starting cyclists, 29 reached the finish.

== Route ==
The race started in Ghent and covered 260 km on the way to the finish in Wetteren.

The course featured 3 categorized climbs:

- Kwaremont
- Kruisberg
- Edelareberg

== Race report ==
25 year-old De Caluwé won the sprint from a group of 9 riders. He completed the race with an average of 33,77 km/h.

== General classification ==
=== Final general classification ===
Rank	Rider	Team	Time
1	Edgard De Caluwé (BEL)	Dilecta–Wolber	7h 42' 00"
2	Sylvère Maes (BEL)	Alcyon–Dunlop	s.t.
3	Marcel Kint (BEL)	Mercier–Hutchinson	s.t.
4	Louis Hardiquest (BEL)	De Dion Bouton	s.t.
5	Maurice Croon (BEL)	Wim Sport	s.t.
6	Constant Lauwers (BEL)	Helyett–Hutchinson	s.t.
7	Émile Masson Jr. (BEL)	Alcyon–Dunlop	s.t.
8	René Walschot (BEL)	J.B. Louvet–Wolber	s.t.
9	Edward Vissers (BEL)	Alcyon–Dunlop	s.t.
10	Gaston Rebry (BEL)	Mercier–Hutchinson	+ 25"
