= 1938 Paris–Roubaix =

Cycling race

Race details
- Dates: 17 April 1938
- Stages: 1
- Distance: 255 km (158 mi)
- Winning time: 8h 13' 38"

Results
| | Winner | Lucien Storme (BEL) |
| | Second | Louis Hardiquest (BEL) |
| | Third | Marcel van Houtte (BEL) |

The 1938 Paris–Roubaix was the 39th edition of the Paris–Roubaix, a classic one-day cycle race in France. The single day event was held on 17 April 1938 and stretched 255 km (158 mi) from Paris to its end in a velodrome in Roubaix. The winner was Lucien Storme from Belgium.

== Results ==
Final results (1–10)
| Rank | Cyclist | Time |
|---|---|---|
| 1 | Lucien Storme (BEL) | 8h 13' 38″ |
| 2 | Louis Hardiquest (BEL) | +0' 00″ |
| 3 | Marcel van Houtte (BEL) | +0' 06″ |
| 4 | Émile Masson Jr. (BEL) | +0' 23″ |
| 5 | Gérard Desmedt (BEL) | +0' 39″ |
| 6 | René Walschot (BEL) | +0' 39″ |
| 7 | Jean Fréchaut (FRA) | +0' 39″ |
| 8 | Sylvain Grysolle (BEL) | +0' 39″ |
| 9 | Albertin Disseaux (BEL) | +0' 39″ |
| 10 | Stan Lauwers (BEL) | +0' 39″ |
