= 1937 UCI Road World Championships – Men's road race =

Men's Individual Road Race
1937 UCI Road World Championships
- Rainbow jersey

Race details
- Dates: 23 August 1937
- Stages: 1
- Distance: 297.5 km (184.9 mi)
- Winning time: 7h 59' 48"

Results
| | Winner | Éloi Meulenberg (BEL) | (Belgium) |
| | Second | Emil Kijewski (GER) | (Germany) |
| | Third | Paul Egli (SUI) | (Switzerland) |

The men's road race at the 1937 UCI Road World Championships was the 11th edition of the event. The race took place on Monday 23 August 1937 in Copenhagen, Denmark. The race was won by Éloi Meulenberg of Belgium.

== Final classification ==
General classification

| Rank | Rider | Time |
|---|---|---|
| 1st place, gold medalist(s) | Éloi Meulenberg (BEL) | 7h 59' 48" |
| 2nd place, silver medalist(s) | Emil Kijewski (GER) | + 0" |
| 3rd place, bronze medalist(s) | Paul Egli (SUI) | + 0" |
| 4 | Jean Majerus (LUX) | + 0" |
| 5 | Georges Speicher (FRA) | + 0" |
| 6 | Aad van Amsterdam (NED) | + 6' 14" |
| 7 | Michel D'Hooghe (BEL) | + 6' 14" |
| 8 | Otto Weckerling (GER) | + 6' 14" |
