= Oberbeck =

Oberbeck is a surname. Notable people with the surname include:

- Anton Oberbeck (1846–1900), German physicist
- Henry Oberbeck (1858–1921), baseball outfielder, third baseman, pitcher and Umpire
- Susanne Oberbeck, electronic musician
- Willi Oberbeck (1910–1979), German professional road bicycle racer
