= 1936 Tour of Flanders =

Race details
- Dates: 5 April 1936
- Stages: 1
- Distance: 250 km (155.3 mi)
- Winning time: 7h 30' 00"

Results
	Winner	Louis Hardiquest (BEL)
	Second	Edgard De Caluwé (BEL)
	Third	François Neuville (BEL)

The 20th edition of the Tour of Flanders cycling classic race was held on Sunday, 5 April 1936. Belgian Louis Hardiquest won the Monument. Of the 170 starting cyclists, 28 reached the finish.

== Route ==
The race started in Ghent and covered 250 km on the way to the finish in Wetteren.

The course featured 3 categorized climbs:

- Kwaremont
- Kruisberg
- Edelareberg

== Race report ==
The final winner was the Belgian Louis Hardiquest, who beat his three escape companions in the sprint in Wetteren. Compatriots Edgard De Caluwé and François Neuville were second and third respectively. Hardiquest completed the race with an average of 33,333 km/h.

== General classification ==
=== Final general classification ===
Rank	Rider	Team	Time
1	Louis Hardiquest (BEL)	De Dion Bouton	7h 30' 00"
2	Edgard De Caluwé (BEL)	Dilecta–Wolber	s.t.
3	François Neuville (BEL)	Helyett–Hutchinson	s.t.
4	Cyriel van Overberghe (BEL)	Mercier–Hutchinson-Leducq	s.t.
5	Albert Hendrickx (BEL)	Alcyon–Dunlop	+ 25"
6	Leopold Vandenbossche (BEL)	Dilecta–Wolber	+ 3'
7	Petrus van Teemsche (BEL)	Genial Lucifer-Hutchinson	s.t.
8	Romain Gijssels (BEL)	Dilecta–Wolber	s.t.
9	Jean Wauters (BEL)	Helyett–Hutchinson	s.t.
10	Michel D'Hooghe (BEL)	Van Hauwaert	s.t.
