= 1936 Liège–Bastogne–Liège =

Race details
- Dates: 26 April 1936
- Stages: 1
- Distance: 211 km (131 mi)
- Winning time: 5h 51' 00"

Results
	Winner	Albert Beckaert (BEL)
	Second	Gilbert Levae (BEL)
	Third	Jan-Jozef Horemans (BEL)

The 1936 Liège–Bastogne–Liège was the 26th edition of the Liège–Bastogne–Liège cycle race and was held on 26 April 1936. The race started and finished in Liège. The race was won by Albert Beckaert.

== General classification ==
Final general classification

Rank	Rider	Time
1	Albert Beckaert (BEL)	5h 51' 00"
2	Gilbert Levae (BEL)	+ 46"
3	Jan-Jozef Horemans (BEL)	+ 1' 05"
4	Antonio Fabris (ITA)	+ 1' 47"
5	Éloi Meulenberg (BEL)	+ 3' 06"
6	Louis Hardiquest (BEL)	+ 3' 06"
7	Joseph Huts (BEL)	+ 3' 06"
8	Jérôme France (BEL)	+ 3' 06"
9	Raymond Laplume (BEL)	+ 3' 06"
10	Arsène Mersch (LUX)	+ 3' 06"
