= Knutti =

Knutti is a surname. Notable people with the surname include:

- Albert Knutti (1912–1997), Swiss cyclist
- Reto Knutti (born 1973), Swiss climate scientist and professor
- Thomas Knutti (born 1973), Swiss politician
