= 1937 Tour of Flanders =

Race details
- Dates: 21 March 1937
- Stages: 1
- Distance: 267 km (165.9 mi)
- Winning time: 7h 29' 00"

Results
	Winner	Michel D'Hooghe (BEL)
	Second	Hubert Deltour (BEL)
	Third	Louis Hardiquest (BEL)

The 21st edition of the Tour of Flanders cycling classic race was held on Sunday, 21 March 1937. Belgian Michel d'Hooghe won the Monument. Of the 181 starting cyclists, 43 reached the finish.

== Route ==
The race started in Ghent and covered 267 km on the way to the finish in Wetteren.

The course featured 3 categorized climbs:

- Kwaremont
- Kruisberg
- Edelareberg

== Race report ==
25 year-old D'Hooghe won the bunch sprint from a group of ten. He completed the race with an average of 35,679 km/h.

== Notable ==
Like many other cyclists of his generation, Michel D'Hooghe's professional career was cut short due to the Second World War, during which he died as a result of an aerial bombardment over the city of Lokeren in May 1940.

== General classification ==
=== Final general classification ===
Rank	Rider	Team	Time
1	Michel D'Hooghe (BEL)	Van Hauwaert	7h 29' 00"
2	Hubert Deltour (BEL)	Alcyon–Dunlop	s.t.
3	Louis Hardiquest (BEL)	Dilecta–Wolber	s.t.
4	Adolphe Braeckeveldt (BEL)	Helyett-Splendor	s.t.
5	Alfons Schepers (BEL)	Colin-Wolber	s.t.
6	Albert Hendrickx (BEL)	Labor–Dunlop	s.t.
7	René Walschot (BEL)	J.B. Louvet–Wolber	s.t.
8	Jean Wauters (BEL)	Helyett-Splendor	s.t.
9	Sylvère Maes (BEL)	Alcyon–Dunlop	s.t.
10	Albertin Disseaux (BEL)	Helyett-Splendor	s.t.
