= 1937 Liège–Bastogne–Liège =

Race details
- Dates: 10 April 1937
- Stages: 1
- Distance: 211 km (131 mi)
- Winning time: 5h 49' 30"

Results
	Winner	Éloi Meulenberg (BEL)
	Second	Gustaaf Deloor (BEL)
	Third	Julien Heernaert (BEL)

The 1937 Liège–Bastogne–Liège was the 27th edition of the Liège–Bastogne–Liège cycle race and was held on 10 April 1937. The race started and finished in Liège. The race was won by Éloi Meulenberg.

== General classification ==
Final general classification

Rank	Rider	Time
1	Éloi Meulenberg (BEL)	5h 49' 30"
2	Gustaaf Deloor (BEL)	+ 0"
3	Julien Heernaert (BEL)	+ 0"
4	René Pedroli (SUI)	+ 0"
5	René Walschot (BEL)	+ 0"
6	Camille Beeckman (BEL)	+ 0"
7	Albert Perikel (BEL)	+ 0"
7	Maurice Cocqueriaux (BEL)	+ 0"
7	Joseph Somers (BEL)	+ 0"
7	Henri Garnier (BEL)	+ 0"
