= Paul Seidel (cyclist) =

German cyclist

Personal information
- Born: 11 January 1913
- Died: 11 June 1940 (aged 27)

Cycling career
- Sport: Cycling
- Discipline: Road
- Role: Rider

Paul Seidel (11 January 1913 – 11 June 1940) was a German racing cyclist. He rode in the 1938 Tour de France.
