= Redange-sur-Attert =

Redange-sur-Attert Réiden op der Atert
- Commune
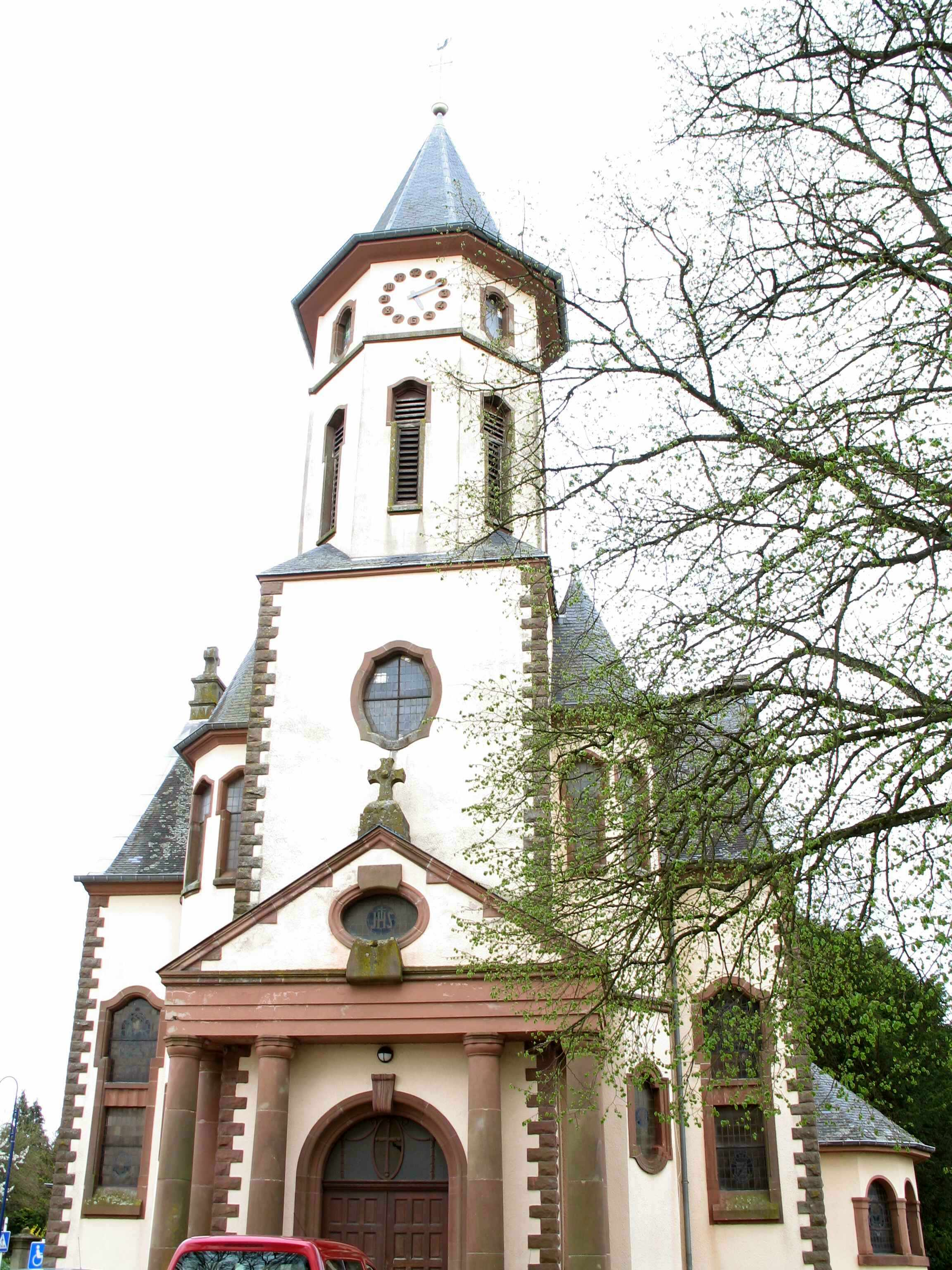
- Redange church

- Coat of arms

- Map of Luxembourg with Redange highlighted in orange, and the canton in dark red
- Coordinates: 49.765203°N 5.889355°E
- Country: Luxembourg
- Canton: Redange

Government
  - Mayor: Henri Gerekens

Area
  - Total: 31.95 km^{2} (12.34 sq mi)
  - Rank: 23rd of 100
- Highest elevation: 493 m (1,617 ft)
  - Rank: 21st of 100
- Lowest elevation: 253 m (830 ft)
  - Rank: 56th of 100

Population (2026)
  - Total: 3,160
  - Rank: 56th of 100
  - Density: 98.9/km^{2} (256/sq mi)
  - Rank: 70th of 100
- Time zone: UTC+1 (CET)
  - Summer (DST): UTC+2 (CEST)
- LAU 2: LU0000706
- Website: redange.lu

Redange or Redange-sur-Attert (French: [ʁedɑ̃ʒ]; Luxembourgish: Réiden [ˈʀɜɪ̯dən]; German: Redingen [ˈʁeːdɪŋən]) is a commune and town in northwestern Luxembourg, near the border with Belgium. It is situated in the eponymous canton of Redange. Redange is situated on the river Attert, a tributary of the Alzette.

As of September 2026, the town of Redange, which lies in the west of the commune, has a population of 1,660. Other towns within the commune include Lannen, Nagem, Niederpallen, Ospern, and Reichlange.

== Notable people ==
- Léopold Bian (1832-1899), Member of the Chamber of Deputies, Mayor of Redange, died in Redange
- Émile Bian (1873-1918), Member of the Chamber of Deputies, 1916-1918
- brothers Pierre (1913–1963) & Mathias Clemens (1915—2001), professional road bicycle racers
- Camille Kerger (born 1957), a Luxembourgish composer, opera singer and music teacher.
- Jean-Claude Juncker (born 1954), a Luxembourgish politician, Prime minister of Luxembourg (1995-2013) and President of the European Commission (2014-2019)

== Population ==
Historical population

Year	Pop.	±%
1821	1,205	—
1851	1,895	+57.3%
1900	1,957	+3.3%
1910	1,971	+0.7%
1922	1,870	−5.1%
1935	1,744	−6.7%

Year	Pop.	±%
1947	1,765	+1.2%
1960	1,693	−4.1%
1970	1,782	+5.3%
1981	1,701	−4.5%
1990	1,812	+6.5%
2000	2,281	+25.9%

Year	Pop.	±%
2005	2,303	+1.0%
2010	2,480	+7.7%
2015	2,613	+5.4%
2020	2,905	+11.2%
2021	2,910	+0.2%

Source data
