= Nagem =

Coordinates: 49°47′N 5°51′E

Nagem Nojem
- Village
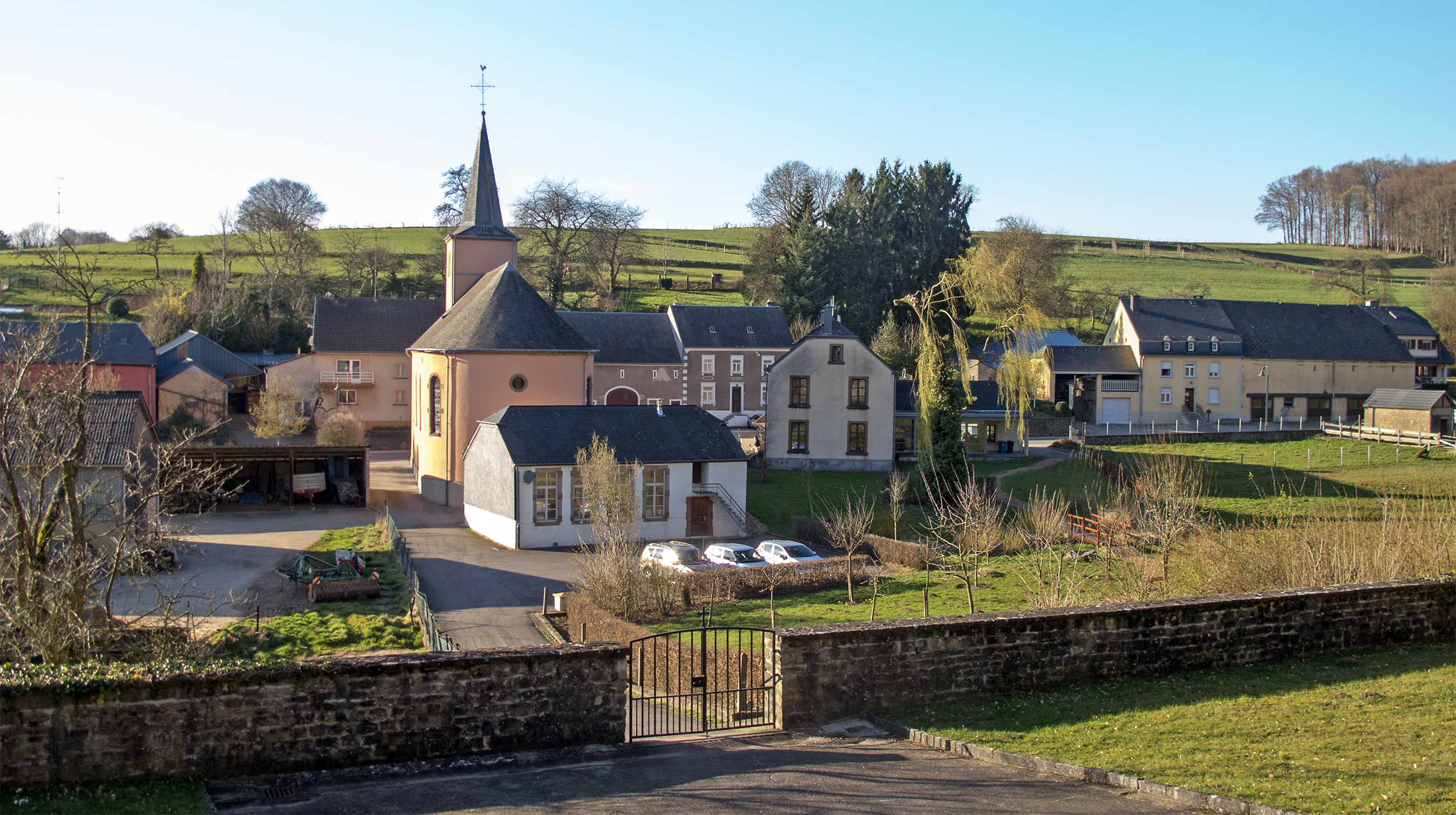
- View over Nagem
- Interactive map of Nagem
- Country: Luxembourg
- Canton: Redange
- Commune: Redange-sur-Attert

Population
  - Total: 223
- Time zone: UTC+1 (CET)
  - Summer (DST): UTC+2 (CEST)

Nagem (lux.: Nojem) is a village in northwestern Luxembourg.

It is situated in the commune of Redange-sur-Attert and has a population of 288 as of September 2026.

== Gallery ==
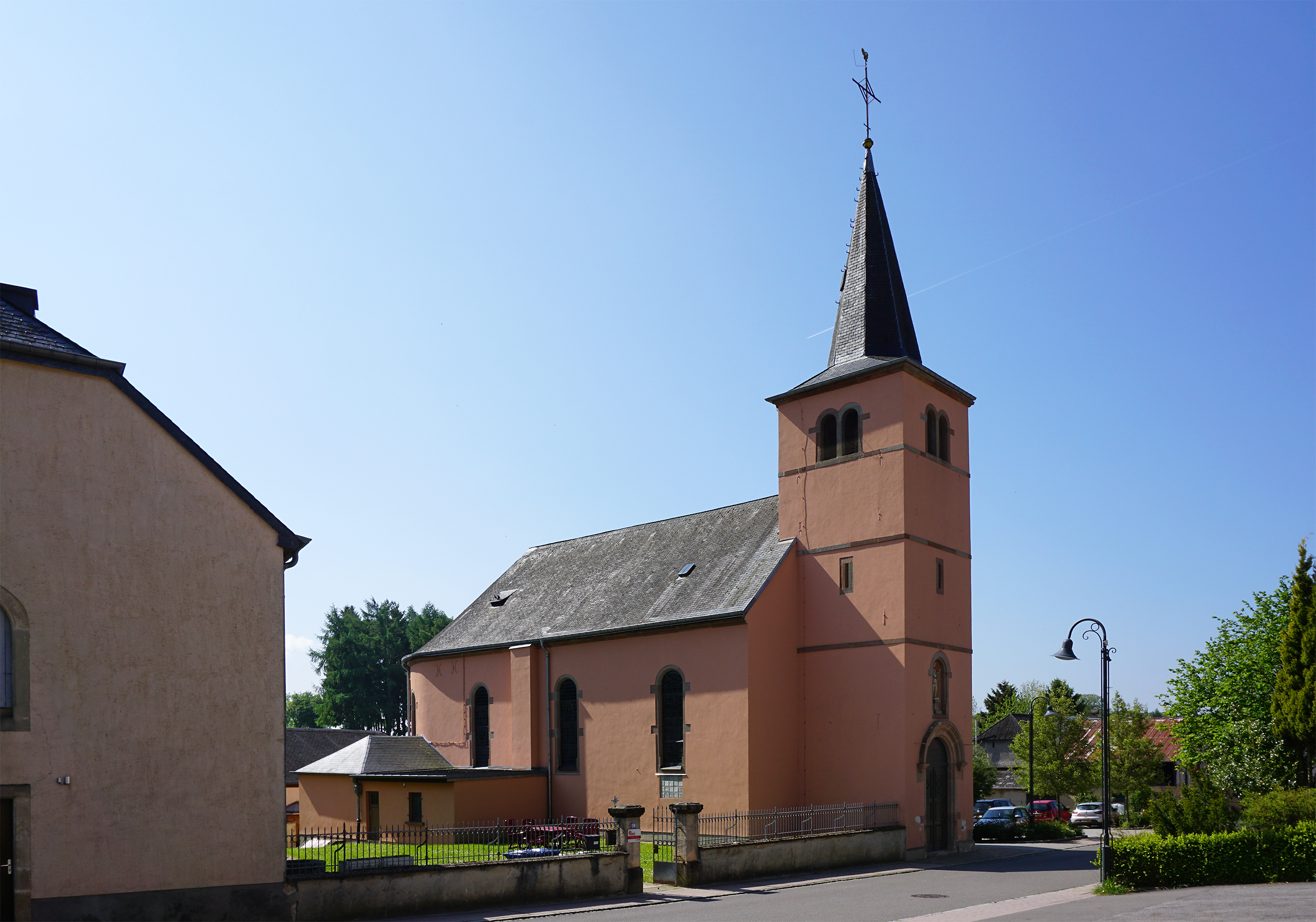
Church in Nagem

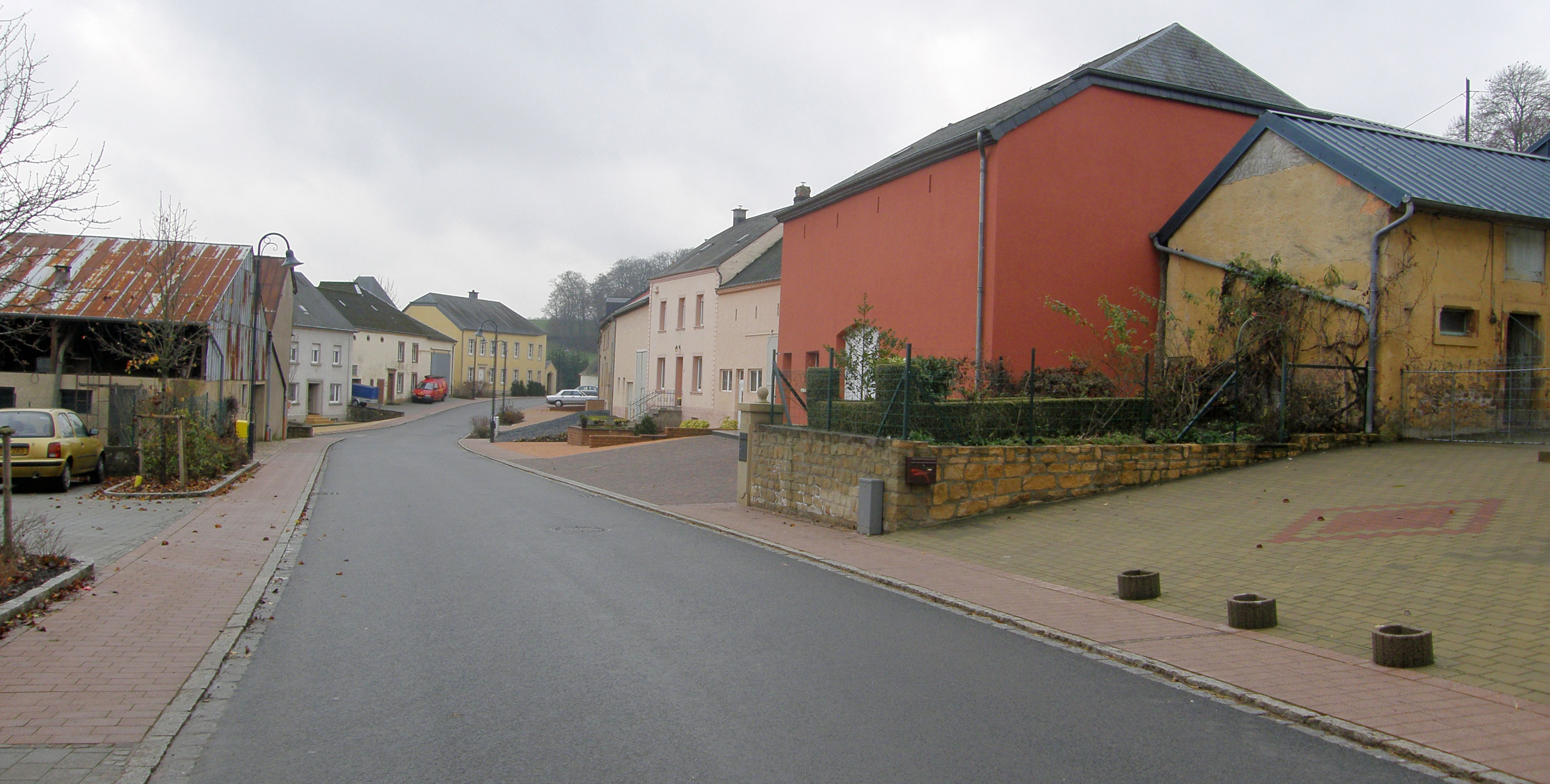
