= Niederpallen =

Coordinates: 49°45′N 5°55′E

Niederpallen (Luxembourgish: Nidderpallen) is a small town in the commune of Redange-sur-Attert, in western Luxembourg. As of September 2026, the town has a population of 432.
