= Lannen =

Lannen Lannen
- Village
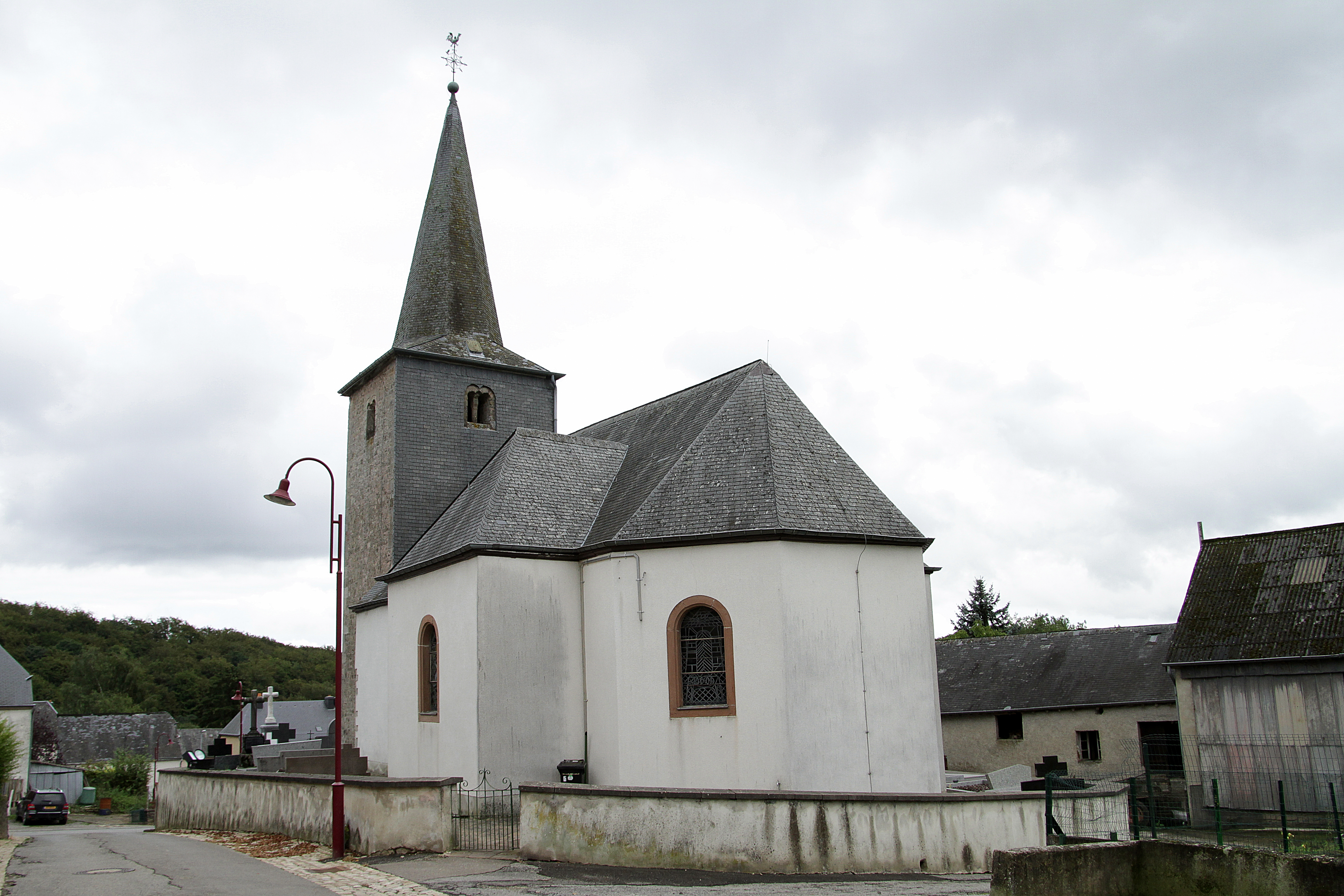
- Church in Lannen
- Interactive map of Lannen
- Country: Luxembourg
- Canton: Redange
- Commune: Redange-sur-Attert

Population
  - Total: 116
- Time zone: UTC+1 (CET)
  - Summer (DST): UTC+2 (CEST)

Lannen (German pronunciation: [ˈlanən]) is a village in northwestern Luxembourg.

It is situated in the commune of Redange-sur-Attert and has a population of 121 as of 2026.

== Gallery ==
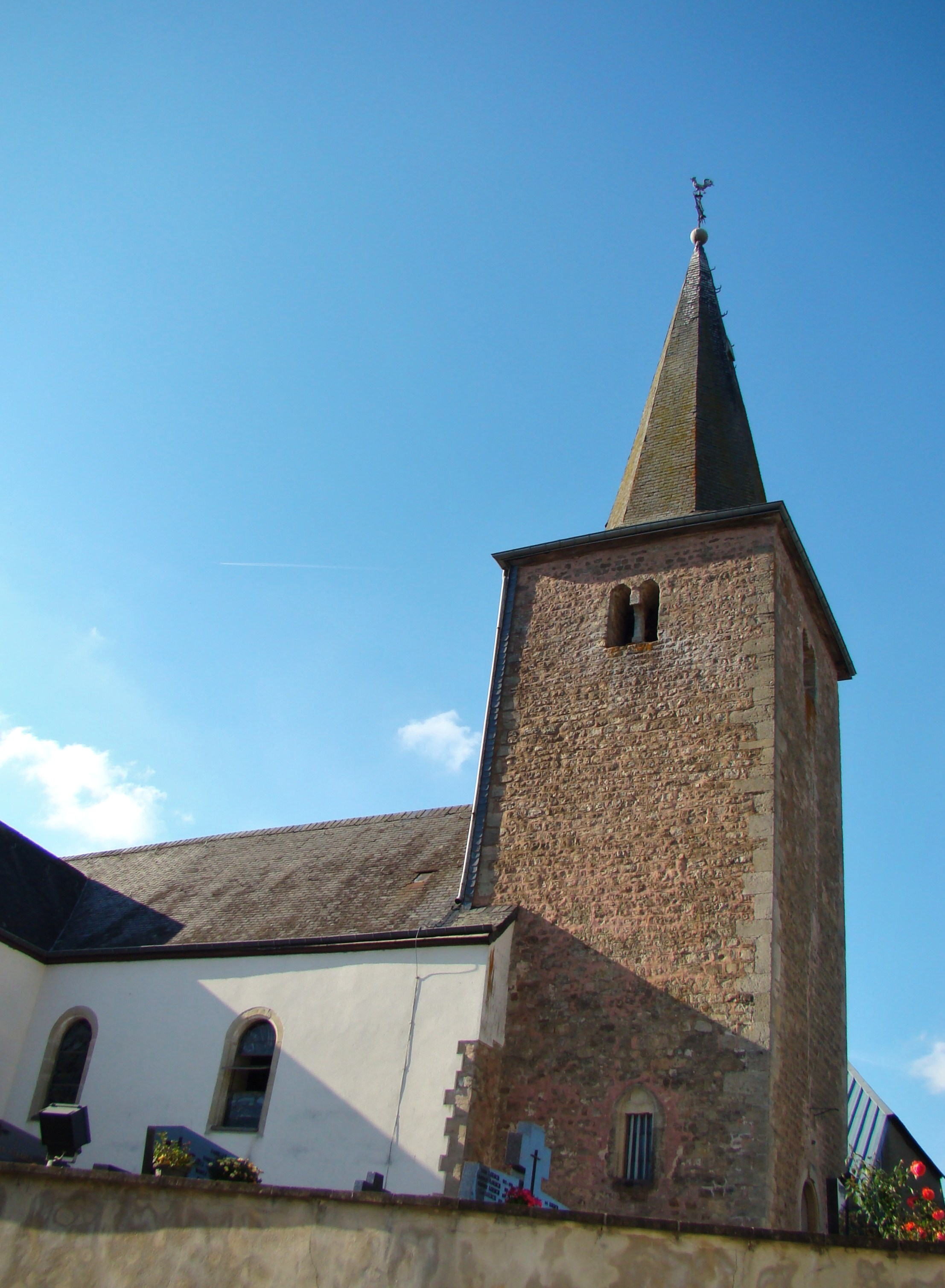

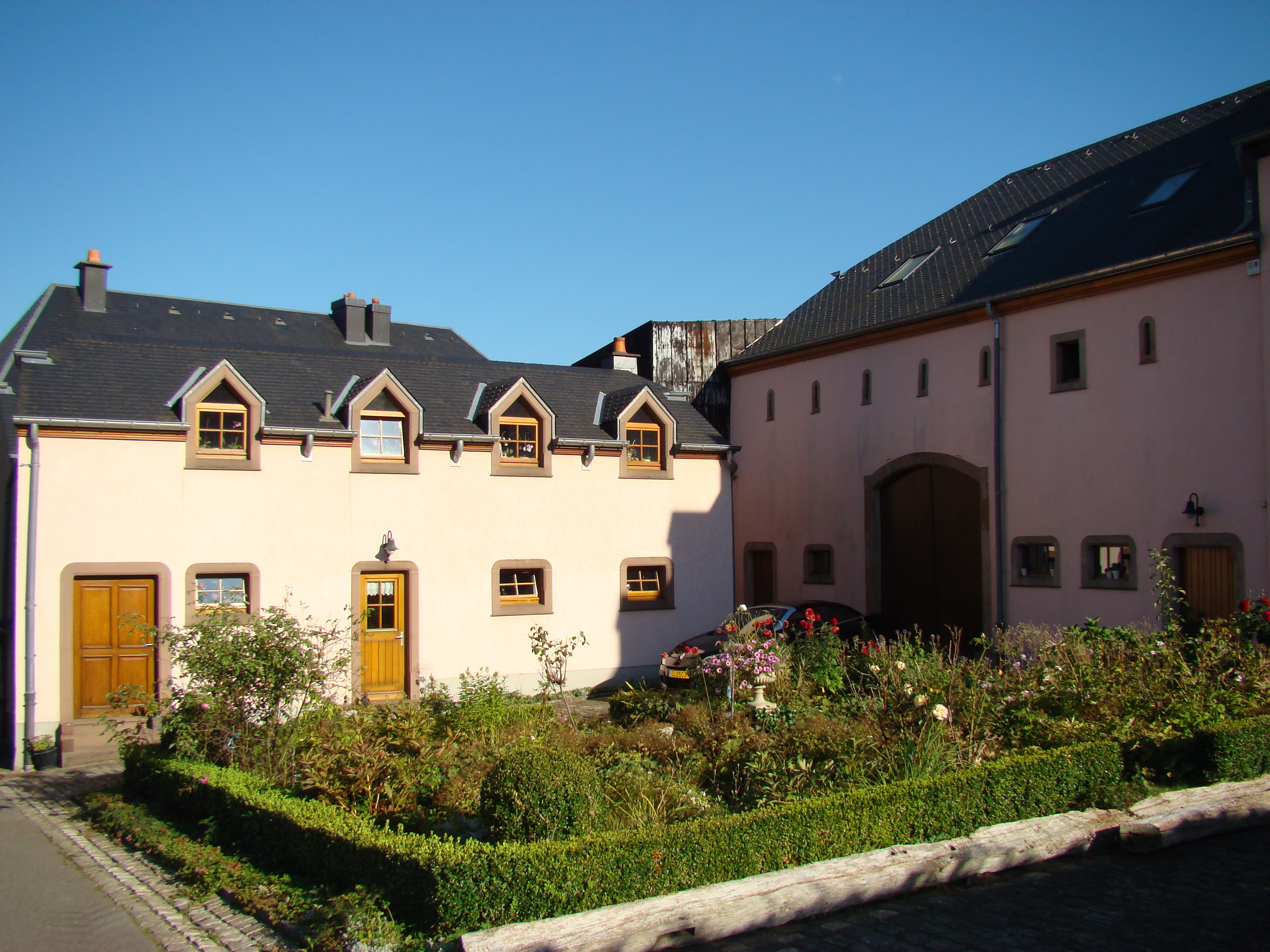
