= Louis Hardiquest =

Belgian cyclist (1910–1991)

- Hardiquest in 1933

Personal information
- Full name: Louis Hardiquest
- Born: 15 December 1910 Hoegaarden, Belgium
- Died: 20 January 1991 (aged 80) Hoegaarden, Belgium

Cycling career
- Sport: Cycling
- Role: Rider

Professional teams
- 1933: Oscar Egg
- 1934: La Française-Dunlop
- 1935-1936: De Dion-Bouton
- 1937: Dilecta-Wolber
- 1938-1940: De Dion-Bouton

Major wins
- One-day races and Classics Tour of Flanders (1936)

Louis Hardiquest (15 December 1910 – 20 January 1991) was a Belgian cyclist who won the Tour of Flanders in 1936. He finished in 8th place in the 1934 Paris–Roubaix and in 2nd place in the 1938 Paris–Roubaix.

== Major results ==
1930
1st Ronde van Limburg
1932
1st Stage 1 Volta a Catalunya
1st Ronde van Haspengouw
1st Tour d'Hesbaye
3rd Bruxelles–Liège
5th Schaal Sels
1933
1st Omloop der Vlaamse Gewesten
1st Tour de Corrèze
2nd Overall Paris–Nice
2nd Scheldeprijs
3rd Tour du Vaucluse
1934
1st Omloop der Vlaamse Gewesten
1st Circuit du Morbihan
2nd Ronde van Haspengouw
8th Paris–Roubaix
1935
1st Paris–Belfort
1st Stage 1 Tour de l'Ouest
2nd Paris–Brussels
2nd Circuit de Paris
2nd Paris–Rennes
3rd Liège–Bastogne–Liège
1936
1st Tour of Flanders
2nd Road race, National Road Championships
3rd Paris–Brussels
3rd Marseille–Lyon
6th Liège–Bastogne–Liège
1937
1st Paris–Boulogne-sur-Mer
1st Ronde van Haspengouw
3rd Paris–Limoges
3rd Tour of Flanders
1938
1st Tielt–Antwerpen–Tielt
2nd Paris–Roubaix
2nd Circuit de Paris
2nd GP Stad Zottegem
4h Tour of Flanders
7th Liège–Bastogne–Liège
1939
2nd GP Stad Vilvoorde
1940
3rd Ransart-Beaumont-Ransart
1949
2nd Schaal Sels
