= Lucien Lamure =

French cyclist (1916–2011)

Personal information
- Born: 21 January 1916
- Died: 2 October 2011 (aged 95)

Cycling career
- Sport: Cycling
- Discipline: Road
- Role: Rider

Lucien Lamure (21 January 1916 – 2 October 2011) was a French racing cyclist. He rode in the 1938 Tour de France.
