= Gaston Grimbert =

French cyclist

Personal information
- Born: 15 August 1914
- Died: 11 April 2011 (aged 96)

Cycling career
- Sport: Cycling
- Discipline: Road
- Role: Rider

Gaston Grimbert (15 August 1914 – 11 April 2011) was a French racing cyclist. He rode in the 1938 Tour de France.
