= Reichlange =

Coordinates: 49°46′N 5°56′E

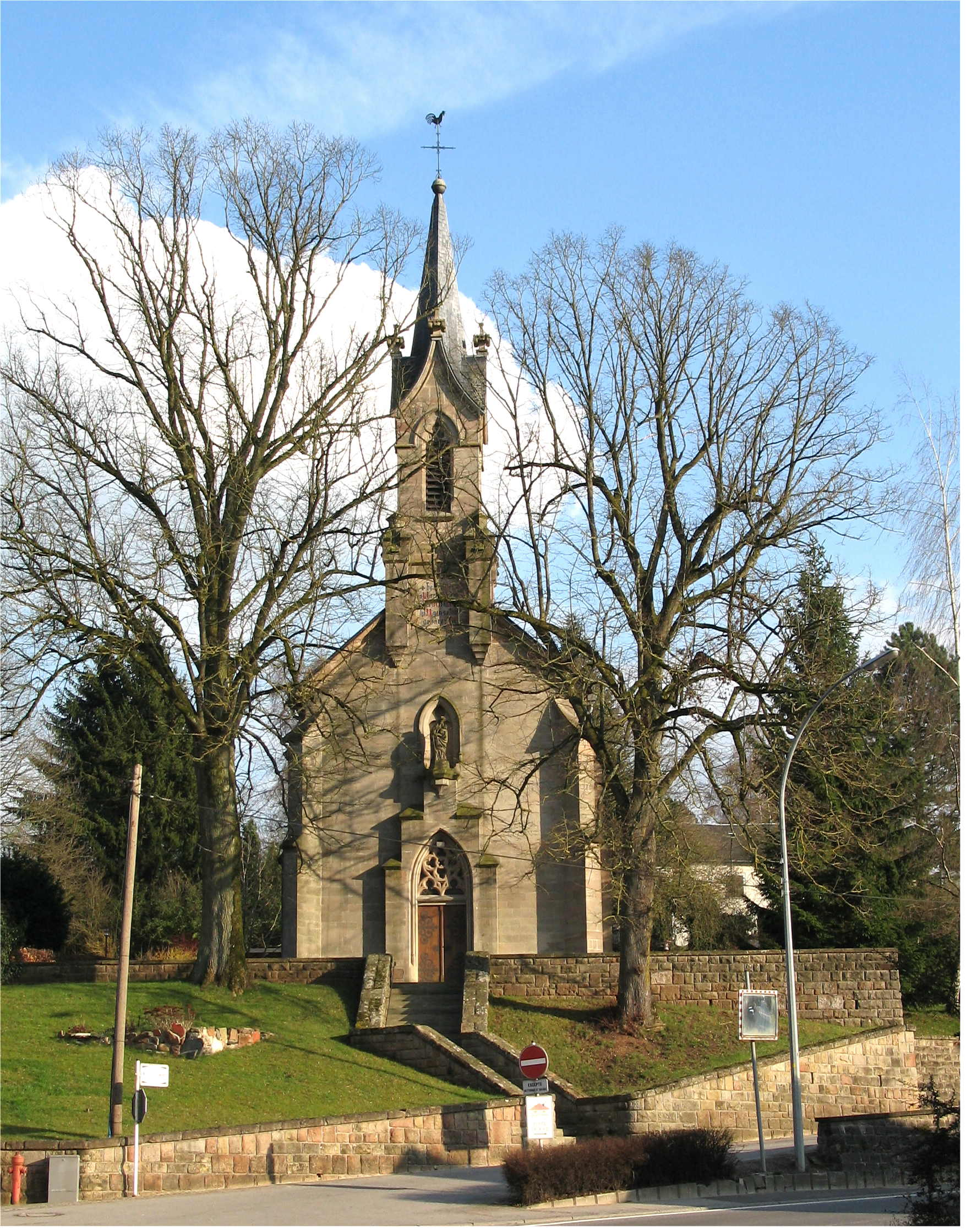
Church of Reichlange

Reichlange (Luxembourgish: Räichel, German: Reichlingen) is a village in the commune of Redange-sur-Attert, in western Luxembourg. As of September 2026, the village has a population of 183.
