= 1934 Paris–Roubaix =

Cycling race

Race details
- Dates: 1 April 1934
- Stages: 1
- Distance: 255 km (158.4 mi)
- Winning time: 7h 52' 07"

Results
	Winner	Gaston Rebry (BEL)
	Second	Jean Wauters (BEL)
	Third	Frans Bonduel (BEL)

The 1934 Paris–Roubaix was the 35th edition of the Paris–Roubaix, a classic one-day cycle race in France. The single day event was held on 1 April 1934 and stretched 255 km (158 mi) from Paris to its end in a velodrome in Roubaix The winner was Gaston Rebry from Belgium, after the original victor, French champion Roger Lapébie, was disqualified for finishing the race on a spectator's bicycle following a puncture.

== Results ==
Final results (1–10)
Rank	Cyclist	Time
1	Gaston Rebry (BEL)	7h 52' 07″
2	Jean Wauters (BEL)	+0' 05″
3	Frans Bonduel (BEL)	+3' 32″
4	René Le Grevès (FRA)	+4' 21″
5	André Godinat (FRA)	+4' 21″
6	Alfons Schepers (BEL)	+8' 12″
7	Romain Maes (BEL)	+8' 12″
8	Louis Hardiquest (BEL)	+8' 12″
9	Raymond Louviot (FRA)	+8' 13″
10	Alfred Haemerlinck (BEL)	+8' 30″
