= Pierre Spaperi =

French cyclist

Personal information
- Born: 12 November 1911

Cycling career
- Sport: Cycling
- Discipline: Road
- Role: Rider

Pierre Spaperi (born 12 November 1911, date of death unknown) was a French racing cyclist. He rode in the 1938 Tour de France.
