= Michel D'Hooghe (cyclist) =

Belgian cyclist

Personal information
- Full name: Michel D'Hooghe
- Born: 19 February 1912 Zele, East Flanders, Belgium
- Died: 12 May 1940 (aged 28) Lokeren, East Flanders, Belgium

Cycling career
- Sport: Cycling
- Role: Rider

Professional team
- 1934–1940: Van Hauwaert

Major wins
- Tour of Flanders (1937)

Michel D'Hooghe (19 February 1912 – 12 May 1940) was a Belgian racing cyclist. He won the Tour of Flanders in 1937. D'Hooghe was killed in action during World War II, during an aerial bombardment over the city of Lokeren in May 1940.

== Major results ==
1933
1st Omloop der Vlaamse Gewesten independents
1934
3rd Grote 1-MeiPrijs
1935
2nd Omloop van het Houtland
2nd GP Dr. Eugeen Roggeman (nl)
4th Ronde van Limburg
1936
1st Ronde van Limburg
1st GP Marcel Kint
2nd Grote 1-MeiPrijs
2nd Nationale Sluitingsprijs
2nd GP Stad Vilvoorde
2nd GP Frans Melckenbeeck (nl)
2nd Omloop van Midden-Vlaanderen
2nd Grote Prijs Stad Sint-Niklaas
3rd Road race, National Road Championships
3rd De Drie Zustersteden
1937
1st Tour of Flanders
1st Grote Prijs Stad Sint-Niklaas
2nd GP Stad Vilvoorde
2nd Scheldeprijs
3rd Omloop van Midden-Vlaanderen
4th GP Marcel Kint
7th Road race, UCI World Championships
1938
2nd Antwerpen–Gent–Antwerpen
6th Ronde van Limburg
