= Edgar Hehlen =

Swiss cyclist

Personal information
- Born: 10 April 1916 Les Hauts-Geneveys, Switzerland
- Died: 16 February 2013 (aged 96) Saint-Julien-en-Genevois, Switzerland

Cycling career
- Sport: Cycling
- Discipline: Road
- Role: Rider

Edgar Hehlen (10 April 1916 – 16 February 2013) was a Swiss racing cyclist. He rode in the 1938 Tour de France.
