= Albert Beckaert =

Belgian cyclist

- Beckaert around 1937

Personal information
- Born: 10 June 1910 Moorsele, Belgium
- Died: 29 May 1980 (aged 69) Kortrijk, Belgium

Cycling career
- Sport: Cycling
- Role: Rider

Albert Beckaert (10 June 1910 – 29 May 1980) was a Belgian racing cyclist. He won the 1936 edition of the Liège–Bastogne–Liège.
