= Paul Langhoff =

German cyclist

Personal information
- Born: 1 January 1914

Cycling career
- Sport: Cycling
- Discipline: Road
- Role: Rider

Paul Langhoff (born 1 January 1914, date of death unknown) was a German racing cyclist. He rode in the 1938 Tour de France.
