= Jean Majerus =

Luxembourgish cyclist

Personal information
- Full name: Jean Majerus
- Born: 6 February 1914 Luxembourg
- Died: 16 June 1983
- Height: 187 cm (6 ft 2 in)

Cycling career
- Sport: Cycling
- Discipline: Road
- Role: Rider
- Rider type: Classics specialist

Professional teams
- 1936–1940: Ruche
- 1941–1942: Wanderer
- 1943–1947: Unknown

Major wins
- Tour de France 1937: one stage, 2 yellow jerseys Tour de France 1938: one stage, 4 yellow jerseys

Jean Majerus (6 February 1914 – 16 June 1983) was a professional Luxembourgish cyclist from 1936 to 1947. Jean had a younger brother, Jacques Majerus, who was also a successful cyclist.

Majerus was educated in Rumelange and then Esch-sur-Alzette, where he trained as a locksmith. He received his first bicycle at the age of seven. He took his first race win in 1933 at a race in Itzig. He was the Luxembourg national junior road race champion in 1934 and 1935, finishing ahead of his brother in the latter year. Majerus turned professional in 1936: that year he also made his Tour de France debut, however he was eliminated at the end of the 13th stage. Similarly, he failed to finish the world championship road race that season.

His first great success was in the 1937 Tour de France, where Majerus won the first stage from Paris to Lille, staging a solo attack in Arras and finishing ahead of his compatriot Arsène Mersch. He remained in the yellow jersey for two days, but was later forced to abandon the race during the eighth stage due to an anorectal abscess. He was, however fit for competition by the time of that year's road world championships, where he was part of the winning breakaway but missed out on the podium in the final sprint, finishing fourth.

In the 1938 Tour de France, Jean Majerus repeated his achievement of the previous year by winning the second stage between Caen and Saint-Brieuc, after he and team-mate Mathias Clemens attacked with 20 km to go: they were joined by another group of eight riders, including former Tour winners Georges Speicher and Antonin Magne. At the entrance to the velodrome where the stage finished, Jean-Marie Goasmat attacked from the lead group, but was hauled back by Majerus who pipped him to the line. By winning the stage he once again took the yellow jersey, this time keeping it for four days. He went on to complete the Tour, finishing in 49th place.

In 1939, Majerus put in some strong performances in one-day classics, finishing 13th in Paris-Robaix after suffering a puncture in the final kilometres, and finishing third in Bordeaux-Paris.

During WWII, when Luxembourg was occupied by the German military, Majerus raced a lot in German-occupied Europe. He also obtained good results at home, finishing fourth in the Tour de Luxembourg in 1942 and 1943. He briefly continued competing after the war, winning the 1946 Grand Prix de Lorraine and the 1947 Luxembourg national individual pursuit title on the track.

After retiring from competition, between 1949 and 1952 he served as driver for Nicolas Frantz in the latter's role as technical director for the Luxembourg national team in the Tour de France. He also worked as a representative of a confectionery wholesaler and a supplier of baked goods, and managed a café in Esch-sur-Alzette. In 1957 he started working for ARBED in Schifflange. After undergoing surgery for thrombosis in his right leg, he became partially paralysed and began using a wheelchair.

Jean Majerus was good in one-day races; in the all-time list he still can be found around place 583. In the world championship road race-ranking he even can be found around place 164, although his best result was fourth place in the 1937 world road race championship.

== Major results ==
1933
1st place in GP Faber
1934
Luxembourg national road race junior champion
1935
Luxembourg national road race junior champion
1936
1936 Tour de France: did not finish
Winner GP de la Flèche
Winner Tour de Lorraine
1937
Tour de France:

Winner stage 1 Paris–Lille
Yellow jersey for 2 days

Luxembourg national road race championship: 2nd place
1st place in Sedan-Rethel
1938
Tour de France:

Winner stage 2: Caen–Saint-Brieuc
Yellow jersey for 4 days

Luxembourg national road race championship: 3rd place
1st place in Vittel
1st place in GP Sanal
1939
Tour de France:did not finish
1st place in Nancy–Strasbourg
3rd Bordeaux–Paris
1940
1st place in Barcelona
1941
1st place in Dortmund Rundfahrt
1st place in Huncherange
1943
1st place in Dortmund Rundfahrt
1st place in 3rd stage Trois Jours d'Esch
1946
1st place in GP de Lorraine
1947
Luxembourg pursuit champion
