= Anton Oberbeck =

German physicist

Anton Oberbeck (25 March 1846 – 23 October 1900) was a German physicist from Berlin.

He studied at Heidelberg and the University of Berlin, obtaining his doctorate from the latter in 1868. From 1870 to 1878 he was a teacher at Sophien-Realgymnasium in Berlin, during which time, he participated in the Franco-Prussian War (1870–71). He lectured at Halle and Karlsruhe and conducted research at the University of Greifswald (1885–1895), and later at the University of Tübingen.

Oberbeck was the first scientist to record the resonance curve in his 1885 paper, ‘On a phenomenon with electrical oscillations which is similar to resonance’.

== Published works ==
- Über die sogenannte Magnetisirungskonstante, 1868 (graduate thesis) – On the so-called magnetic constant.
- Über eine Methode, die Leitungsfähigkeit von Flüssigkeiten für Electricität zu bestimmen, 1874 – On a method for determining the conductivity of liquids involving electricity.
- Ueber stationäre Flüssigkeitsbewegungen mit Berücksichtigung der inneren Reibung. J. reine angew. Math. 81 (1876) 62–80.
- Über die Fortpflanzung der magnetischen Induction im weichen Eisen, 1878 (habilitation thesis) – On the propagation of magnetic induction in soft iron.
- Über die Bewegungen der Luft an der Erdoberfläche, 1882 – On the movements of air at the surface.
- Über die Bewegungserscheinungen der Atmosphaere, 1888 – On the phenomena of motion of the atmosphere.
- Über Licht und Leuchten, 1895 – On lighting and lamps.
- Ueber den Verlauf der electrischen Schwingungen bei den Tesla’schen Versuchen. Annalen der Physik und Chemie, Vol. 55, 1895. – About the behavior of electrical oscillations in the Tesla experiments.
