= Albert Knutti =

Swiss cyclist

Personal information
- Born: 8 May 1912
- Died: 19 March 1997 (aged 84)

Cycling career
- Sport: Cycling
- Discipline: Road
- Role: Rider

Albert Knutti (8 May 1912 – 19 March 1997) was a Swiss racing cyclist. He rode in the 1938 Tour de France.
