= 1939 Paris–Roubaix =

Cycling race

Race details
- Dates: 9 April 1939
- Stages: 1
- Distance: 250 km (155.3 mi)
- Winning time: 7h 17' 30"

Results
	Winner	Émile Masson Jr. (BEL)
	Second	Marcel Kint (BEL)
	Third	Roger Lapébie (FRA)

The 1939 Paris–Roubaix was the 40th edition of the Paris–Roubaix, a classic one-day cycle race in France. The single day event was held on 9 April 1939 and stretched 250 km (155 mi) from Paris to its end in a velodrome in Roubaix. The winner was Émile Masson Jr. from Belgium.

== Results ==
Final results (1–10)
Rank	Cyclist	Time
1	Émile Masson Jr. (BEL)	7h 17' 30″
2	Marcel Kint (BEL)	+1' 30″
3	Roger Lapébie (FRA)	+1' 30″
4	Maurice Archambaud (FRA)	+1' 30″
5	Cyriel Vanoverberghe (BEL)	+1' 30″
6	Sylvain Grysolle (BEL)	+3' 08″
7	Robert Wierinckx (BEL)	+3' 08″
8	Albert Hendrickx (BEL)	+3' 08″
9	Antonin Magne (FRA)	+3' 08″
10	Noël Declercq (BEL)	+3' 08″
