= Éloi Meulenberg =

Belgian cyclist

Eloi Meulenberg
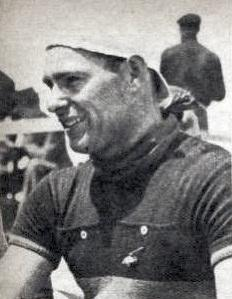
- Meulenberg in 1939

Personal information
- Born: 22 September 1912 Jumet, Belgium
- Died: 26 February 1989 (aged 76) Charleroi, Belgium

Cycling career
- Sport: Cycling
- Discipline: Road
- Role: Rider

Amateur team
- 1934: Independent

Professional teams
- 1934–40: Alcyon-Dunlop
- 1941–42: Individual
- 1943: Helyett-Hutchinson
- 1944: Jordens
- 1946–47: Rochet-Dunlop
- 1948: Peugeot-Dunlop
- 1948: Météore and Elvé-Peugeot
- 1948: Peugeot-Dunlop
- 1949–50: ?

Major wins
- Road Grand Tours Tour de France 9 individual stages (1936, 1937, 1938) One-day races and Classics World Road Race Championships (1937) Liège–Bastogne–Liège (1937) Grand Prix de Fourmies Paris–Brussels (1936) Scheldeprijs (1943) Ronde van Limburg (1945)
Medal record
Representing Belgium
Men's road bicycle racing
World Championships
Gold medal – first place	1937 Copenhagen	Elite Men's Road Race

Eloi Meulenberg (22 September 1912 – 26 February 1989) was a Belgian professional road bicycle racer. He is best known for his gold medal in the Elite Race of the 1937 Road World Championships and his nine stage wins in the Tour de France.

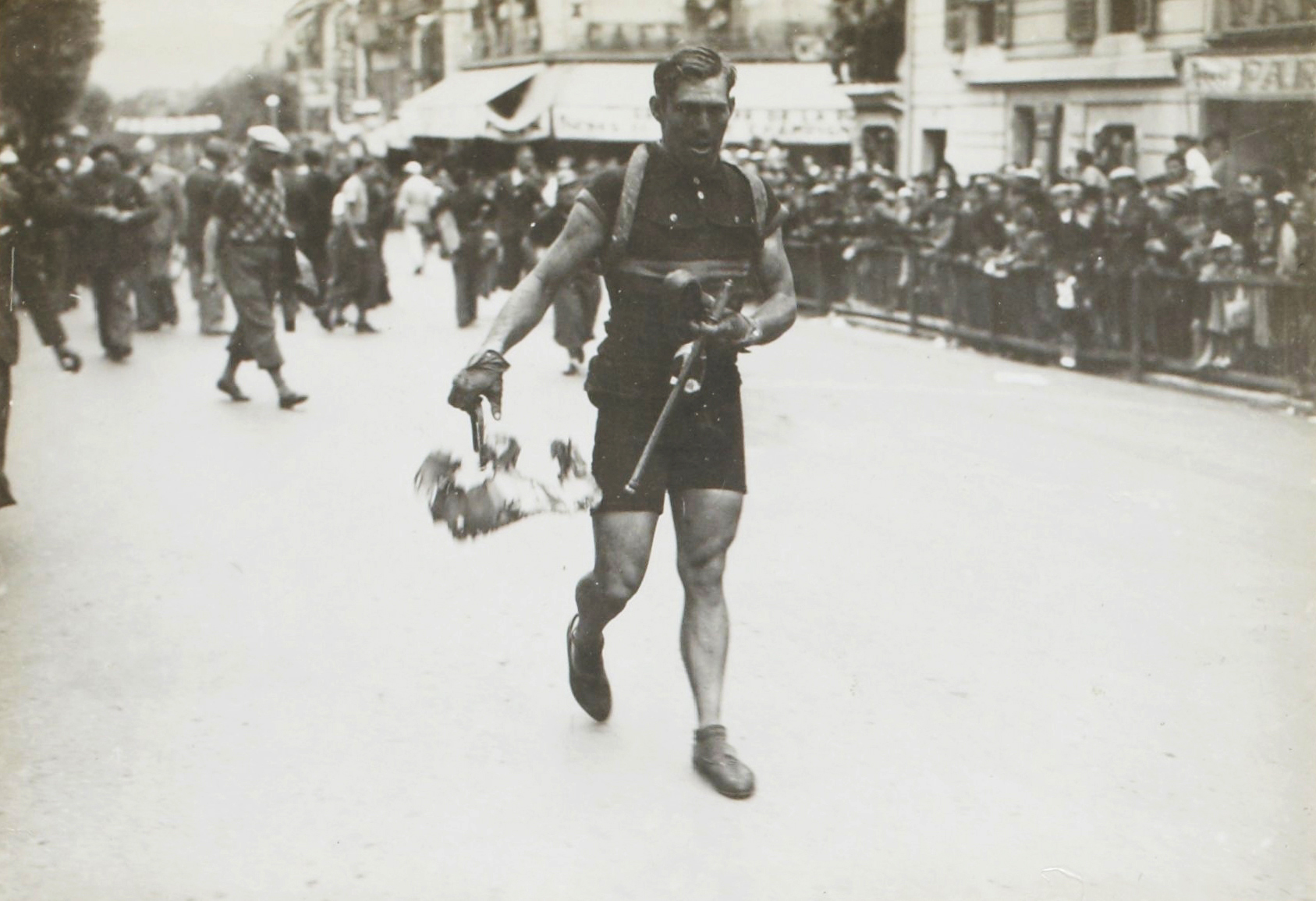
Meulenberg during the 1936 Tour de France

== Major results ==
1932
1st Stage 9 Tour of Belgium Independents
1934
1st Brussels-Liège (fr)
1st Stage 5 Tour de l'Ouest
1935
1st Grand Prix de Fourmies
2nd 1935 Tour of Flanders
1936
1st Paris–Brussels
Tour de France

1st Stages 6 & 18a

3rd Circuit de Paris
5th Liège–Bastogne–Liège
10th La Flèche Wallonne
1937
1st Road race, UCI Road World Championships
1st Liège–Bastogne–Liège
1st GP Stad Vilvoorde
1st Omloop Groot Oostende
1st Bergen op Zoom
1st Critérium de Zürich
Tour de France

1st Stages 11a, 13b, 14a & 14c

1st Stage 1 Tour of Belgium
1938
1st G.P d'Auvelais
1st Critérium de Namur
Tour de France

1st Stages 4a, 4b & 5

8th Paris–Brussels
10th Paris–Tours
1939
1st Nancy-Les Vosges-Nancy
1st Championship of Hainaut
1943
1st Scheldeprijs
1st GP Jordens
1st GP d'Ougrée
1st GP Brussels
1942
1st Marcinelle
1st Seraing
1943
1st Championship of Brabant
1945
1st Ronde van Limburg
1st GP de la Victoire
1st Bonheiden
1st Châtelineau
1st Keumiée
1st Wavre
