= 1937 UCI Road World Championships =

Cycling competition

- Venue: Copenhagen, Denmark
- Coordinates: 55°40′N 12°34′E
- Events: 2

The 1937 UCI Road World Championships was the seventeenth edition of the UCI Road World Championships.

The championships took place in Copenhagen, Denmark. The race for the professionals was the longest to date: 297.5 kilometers over a flat course of 8.5 kilometers, which the riders had to complete 35 times. Only eight riders finished the professional road race.

In the same period, the 1937 UCI Track Cycling World Championships were organized on the velodrome of Ordrup, near Copenhagen.

== Events Summary ==
Event	Gold		Silver		Bronze	
Men's events
Professional Road Race	Éloi Meulenberg; Belgium	7h 59' 48"	Emil Kijewski; Germany	s.t.	Paul Egli; Switzerland	s.t.
Amateur Road Race	Adolfo Leoni; Italy	-	Frode Sørensen; Denmark	-	Fritz Scheller; Germany	-

== Medals table ==
Place	Nation	1st place, gold medalist(s)	2nd place, silver medalist(s)	3rd place, bronze medalist(s)	Total
1	Belgium	1	0	0	1
1	Italy	1	0	0	1
3	Germany	0	1	1	2
4	Denmark	0	1	0	1
5	Switzerland	0	0	1	1
Total		2	2	2	6
