= Glauco Servadei =

Italian cyclist

Personal information
- Full name: Glauco Servadei
- Nickname: Parule
- Born: 28 July 1913 Forlì, Italy
- Died: 27 December 1968 (aged 55) Forlì, Italy

Cycling career
- Sport: Cycling
- Discipline: Road
- Role: Rider
- Rider type: Sprinter

Major wins
- Six stages Giro d'Italia

Glauco Servadei (28 July 1913 – 27 December 1968) was an Italian professional road bicycle racer. Servadei won 6 stages in the Giro d'Italia and two in the Tour de France. He also competed in the individual and team road race events at the 1936 Summer Olympics.

== Major results ==
1931
Giro dell'Emilia
1933
Coppa Città di Asti
1937
Giro d'Italia:

Winner stages 15 and 18

1938
Tour de France:

Winner stages 6B and 20

1939
Giro d'Italia:

Winner stage 9A

1940
Giro d'Italia:

Winner stages 6, 14 and 18

1942
Coppa Bernocchi
Milano – Mantova
1943
Giro della provincia Milano
