= Victor Cosson =

French cyclist

Personal information
- Full name: Victor Cosson
- Born: 11 October 1915 Lorges, France
- Died: 18 June 2009 (aged 93)

Cycling career
- Sport: Cycling
- Discipline: Road
- Role: Rider

Major wins
- Paris–Camembert 1943

Victor Cosson (11 October 1915 – 18 June 2009) was a French professional road bicycle racer from 1937 to 1950. In his second year as a professional cyclist, he finished third in the 1938 Tour de France. His biggest victory was the Paris–Camembert edition of 1943. He was born in Lorges.

== Major results ==
1938
Tour de France:

3rd place overall classification

1943
Paris–Camembert
