= Dante Gianello =

French cyclist

Personal information
- Full name: Dante Gianello
- Born: 26 March 1912 Chiesa in Valmalenco, Italy
- Died: 12 November 1992 (aged 80) Privas, France

Cycling career
- Sport: Cycling
- Discipline: Road
- Role: Rider

Major wins
- One stage 1938 Tour de France

Dante Gianello (26 March 1912, in Chiesa in Valmalenco, Italy – 12 November 1992, in Privas, France) was a professional road bicycle racer. Although born an Italian, he was naturalized as a French citizen in 1931. His career ended when, during the GP del Desembarcament del Sud on 15 August 1945, he was hit by a jeep.

== Major results ==
1935
Nice-Toulon-Nice
1938
Tour de France:

Winner stage 13
10th place overall classification

1939
Boucles de Sospel
1940
Circuit du Pays Grassois
1942
Coupe Marcel Vergeat St-Etienne
1943
GP des Alpes
1945
Circuit des villes d'eaux d'Auvergne
