= Willi Oberbeck =

German cyclist

Personal information
- Full name: Willi Oberbeck
- Born: 21 February 1910 Hagen, Germany

Cycling career
- Sport: Cycling
- Discipline: Road
- Role: Rider

Major wins
- One stage 1938 Tour de France

Willi Oberbeck (21 February 1910 – 1979) was a German professional road bicycle racer. In 1938, Oberbeck won the first stage of the Tour de France, and was therefore leading the general classification for one day. He was born in Hagen.

== Major results ==
1938
4th stage Tour of Germany
Tour de France:

Winner stage 1
Leading general classification for one day
