= Janus Hellemons =

Dutch cyclist

Personal information
- Full name: Janus Hellemons
- Born: 20 July 1912 Hoeven, Netherlands
- Died: 14 January 1999 (aged 86) Bleiswijk, Netherlands

Cycling career
- Sport: Cycling
- Role: Rider

Janus Hellemons (20 July 1912 – 14 January 1999) was a Dutch racing cyclist. He finished in last place in the 1938 Tour de France.
