= Jupp Arents =

German cyclist

Personal information
- Born: 16 March 1912 Köln, Germany
- Died: 24 December 1984 (aged 72) Arnsberg, Germany

Cycling career
- Sport: Cycling
- Role: Rider

Jupp Arents (16 March 1912 – 24 December 1984) was a German racing cyclist. He won the German National Road Race in 1938.
