= Lucien Le Guével =

French cyclist

Personal information
- Born: 20 December 1914
- Died: 7 December 1989 (aged 74)

Cycling career
- Sport: Cycling
- Discipline: Road
- Role: Rider

Lucien Le Guével (20 December 1914 – 7 December 1989) was a French racing cyclist. He rode in the 1938 Tour de France.
