= François Neuville =

Belgian cyclist (1912–1986)

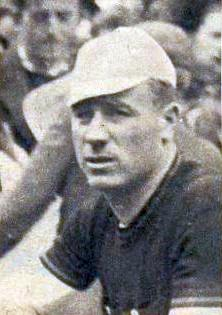
- François Neuville in 1939

Personal information
- Full name: François Neuville
- Born: 24 November 1912 Mons-Crotteux, Belgium
- Died: 12 April 1986 (aged 73) Dadizele, Belgium

Cycling career
- Sport: Cycling
- Discipline: Road
- Role: Rider

Major wins
- One stage 1938 Tour de France; Tour of Belgium (1938)

François Neuville (24 November 1912, in Mons-Crotteux – 12 April 1986, in Dadizele) was a Belgian professional road bicycle racer. Neuville won one stage of the 1938 Tour de France.

== Major results ==
1934
Berlare
Waremme
1938
Tour of Belgium
Hollogne-aux-Pierres
Hologne
Tour de France:

Winner stage 20C

1942
Circuit de France
Antheit
1944
Verviers
