= Yvan Marie =

French cyclist

Personal information
- Born: 10 May 1913 Émiéville, France
- Died: 9 April 1988 (aged 74) Fleury-sur-Orne, France

Cycling career
- Sport: Cycling
- Role: Rider

Yvan Marie (10 May 1913 – 9 April 1988) was a French racing cyclist. He rode in the 1948 Tour de France.
