= Jean Fréchaut =

French cyclist

Jean Frechaut
Personal information
- Full name: Jean Frechaut
- Born: 19 September 1914 Bordeaux, France
- Died: 16 April 2012 (aged 97) Vence, France

Cycling career
- Sport: Cycling
- Discipline: Road
- Role: Rider

Major wins
- 3 stages 1938 Tour de France

Jean Frechaut (19 September 1914 – 16 April 2012) was a French professional road bicycle racer. Frechaut won three stages in the 1938 Tour de France. He was born in Bordeaux.

== Major results ==
1937
Tour de France:

10th place overall classification

1938
Tour de France:

Winner stages 9, 12 and 17B
