= Constant Lauwers =

Belgian cyclist

Personal information
- Born: 4 March 1916
- Died: 2 April 1983 (aged 67)

Cycling career
- Sport: Cycling
- Discipline: Road
- Role: Rider

Constant Lauwers (4 March 1916 – 2 April 1983) was a Belgian racing cyclist. He rode in the 1938 Tour de France.
