= Otto Weckerling =

German cyclist

Personal information
- Full name: Otto Weckerling
- Born: 23 October 1910 Magdeburg, German Empire
- Died: 6 May 1977 (aged 66) Dortmund, West Germany

Cycling career
- Sport: Cycling
- Discipline: Road
- Role: Rider

Major wins
- Two stages Tour de France

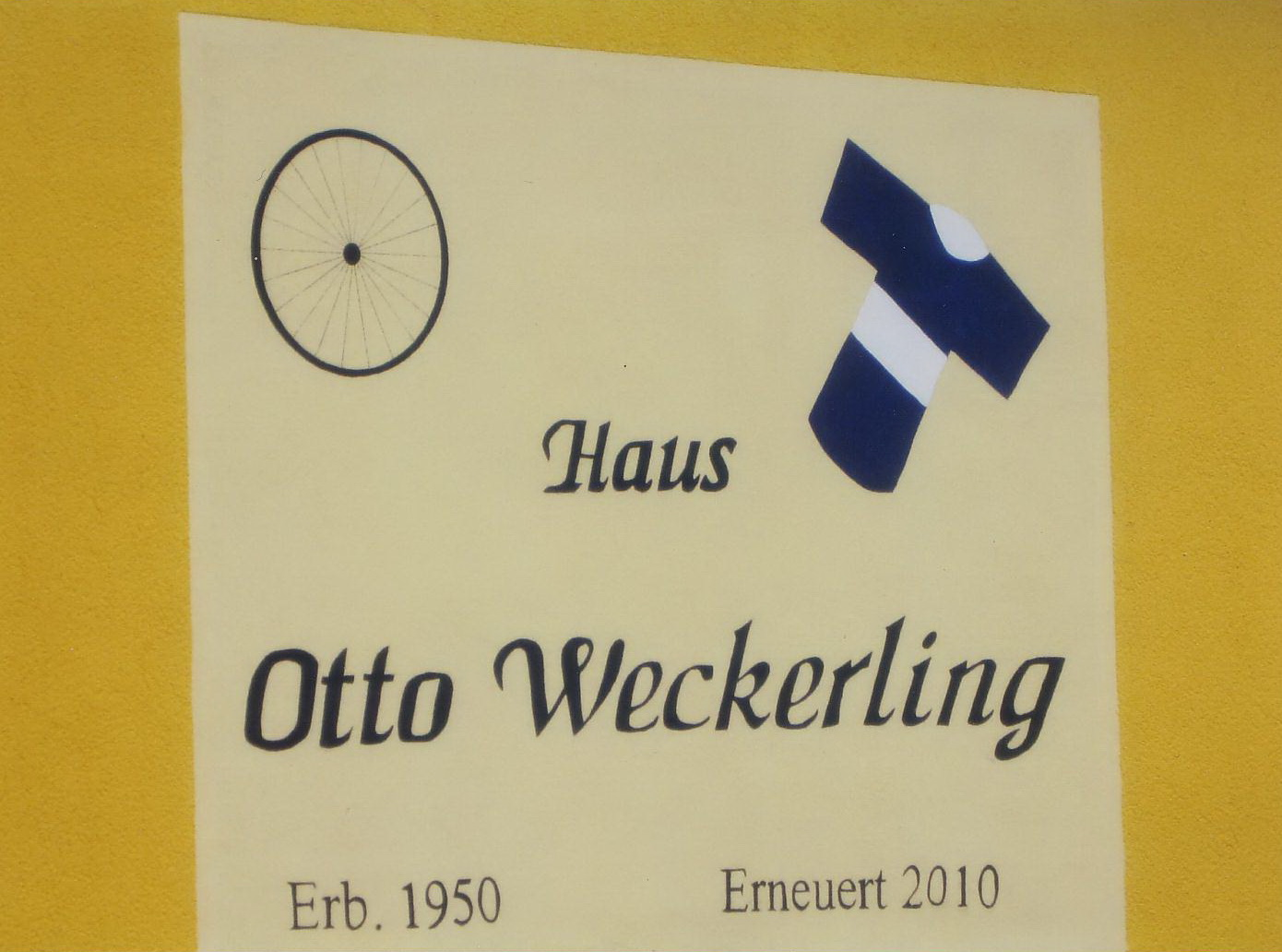
Image showing tomb of Otto Weckerling

Otto Weckerling (Magdeburg, 23 October 1910 — Dortmund, 6 May 1977) was a German professional road bicycle racer. Weckerling won two stages in the Tour de France.

== Major results ==
1936
Frankfurt
1937
Deutschland Tour
Tour de France:

Winner stage 8

1938
Tour de France:

Winner stage 17

1950
Germany National Track Madison Championship (with Werner Richter)
