= Mathias Clemens =

Luxembourgish cyclist

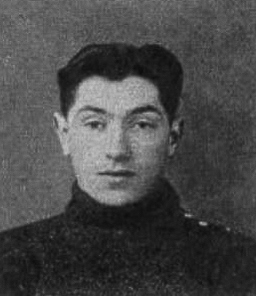
- Mathias Clemens

Personal information
- Full name: Mathias Clemens
- Born: 8 August 1915 Redange, Luxembourg
- Died: 26 November 2001 (aged 86) Huncherange, Luxembourg

Cycling career
- Sport: Cycling
- Discipline: Road
- Role: Rider

Major wins
- One stage 1936 Tour de France

Mathias Clemens (8 August 1915 — 26 November 2001) was a Luxembourgish professional road bicycle racer. He was the brother of cyclist Pierre Clemens.

== Major results ==
1935
Tour de Luxembourg

Overall classification

1936
Grunwald
Luxembourg
Tour de France:

Winner stage 3
7th place overall classification

Tour de Luxembourg:

Overall classification
Winner stage 8

1937
Tour de Luxembourg:

Overall classification
Winner stage 1

1938
Hollerich
Luxembourg
Luxembourg national road race championships
Tour de Luxembourg:

Winner stage 3

Tour de France:

5th place overall classification

1939
Tour de Luxembourg:

Overall classification
Winner stages 3 and 4

Tour de France:

4th place overall classification

1940
Luxembourg national cyclo-cross championships
1941
GP Schweinfurt (GER)
Luxembourg
Rundfahrt Westmark (inc. stage 2)
1942
Esch-sur-Alzette
Huncherange
1943
Pétange
Wiltz
1944
Esch-sur-Alzette
Wiltz
1947
Alger
Tour de Luxembourg:

Overall classification
Winner stage 3

Luxembourg national road race championships
1948
3rd Tour de Romandie
