= René Walschot =

Belgian cyclist

Personal information
- Born: 21 April 1916
- Died: 16 June 2003 (aged 87)

Cycling career
- Sport: Cycling
- Discipline: Road
- Role: Rider

René Walschot (21 April 1916 – 16 June 2003) was a Belgian racing cyclist. He rode in the 1938 Tour de France.
