= Émile Masson Jr. =

Belgian cyclist (1915–2011)

Personal information
- Full name: Émile Masson
- Born: 1 September 1915 Hollogne-aux-Pierres, Belgium
- Died: 2 January 2011 (aged 95)

Cycling career
- Sport: Cycling
- Discipline: Road
- Role: Rider

Major wins
- Belgian National Road Race Champion (1946, 1947); La Flèche Wallone (1938); Paris–Roubaix (1939); Bordeaux–Paris (1946); Tour de France, 1 stage

Émile Masson Jr. (1 September 1915 – 2 January 2011) was a Belgian professional road bicycle racer.

He was born in Hollogne-aux-Pierres, the son of former cyclist Émile Masson Sr. Masson was Belgian road race champion twice, and won important races such as La Flèche Wallonne, Paris–Roubaix and Bordeaux–Paris.

He died on 2 January 2011 at the age of 95.

== Major results ==
1937
Koersel
1938
La Flèche Wallonne
Brussel-Hozémont
Tour de France:

Winner stage 17A

1939
Paris–Roubaix
Stal-Koersel
1946
(Belgium) Belgian National Road Race Championships
Bordeaux–Paris
1947
(Belgium) Belgian National Road Race Championships
1949
Liège-St. Hubert
1950
Liège
