= 1938 Tour de France =

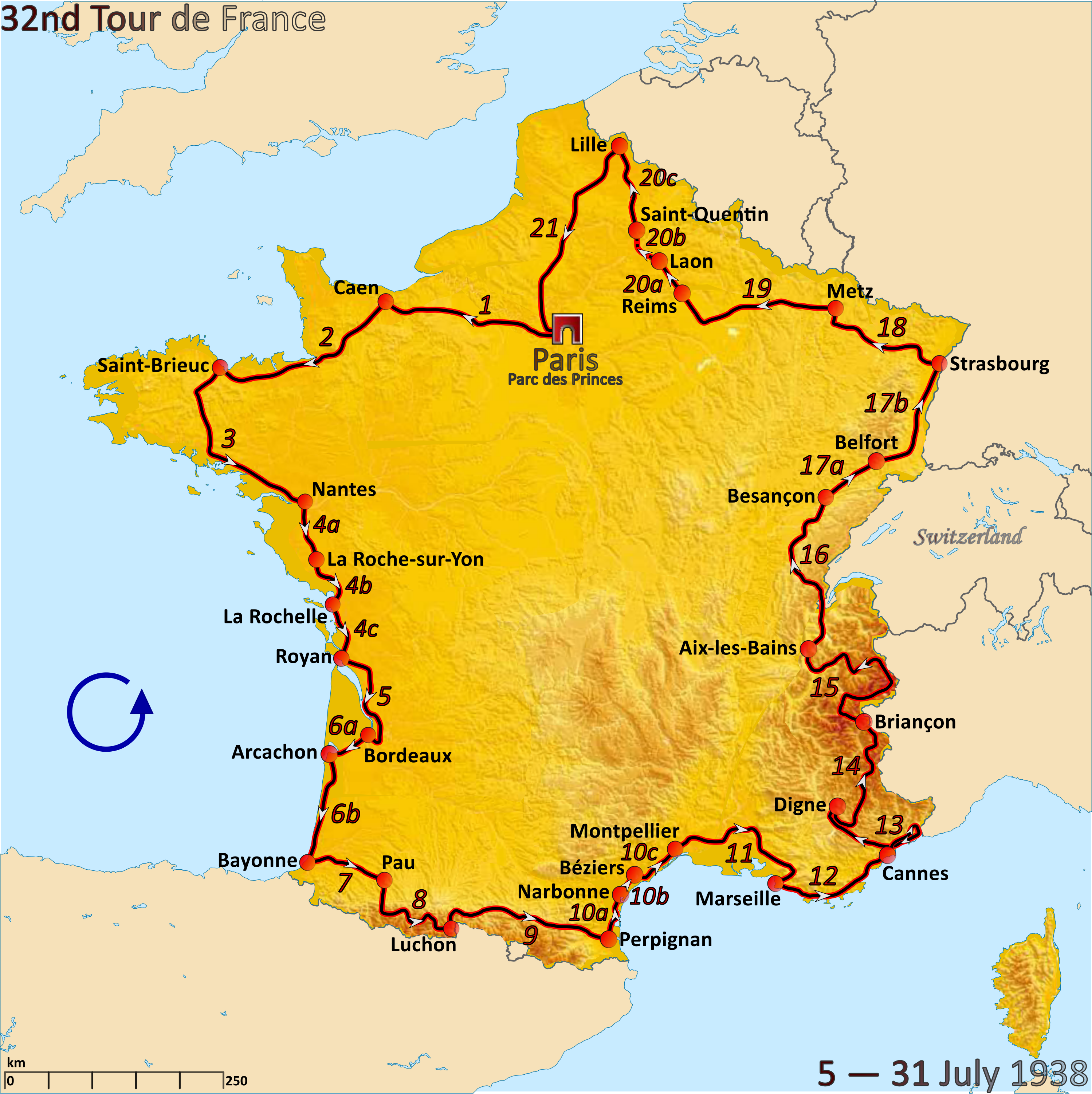
- Route of the 1938 Tour de France followed counterclockwise, starting in Paris

Race details
- Dates: 5–31 July 1938
- Stages: 21, including five split stages
- Distance: 4,694 km (2,917 mi)
- Winning time: 148h 29' 12"

Results
Jersey awarded to the overall winner	Winner	Gino Bartali (ITA)	(Italy)
	Second	Félicien Vervaecke (BEL)	(Belgium)
	Third	Victor Cosson (FRA)	(France)
	Mountains	Gino Bartali (ITA)	(Italy)
	Team	Belgium	

The 1938 Tour de France was the 32nd edition of the Tour de France, taking place from 5 to 31 July. It was composed of 21 stages over 4,694 km (2,917 mi).The race was won by Italian cyclist Gino Bartali, who also won the mountains classification.

== Innovations and changes ==
The bonification system was reduced compared to 1937: the winner of a stage now only received one minute bonification time, added by the margin to the second arriving cyclist, with a maximum of 75 seconds. The cyclists who reached a mountain top that counted towards the mountains classification first, now received only one minute bonification time.

The team trial stages, where the teams departed 15 minutes separately, were removed from the race. They would later return in the 1954 Tour de France, in a different form. Instead, the 1938 Tour de France featured two individual time trials.

In previous years, some cyclists were in teams and other rode individually. In 1937, there had been problems with individual cyclists being accused of helping other cyclists, culminating in the Belgian cyclists leaving the Tour. To avoid these problems, the categories for individual cyclists were removed for the 1938 Tour de France, and the race was contested by national teams. But because there were many French cyclists that did not fit into the national team, there were two extra French teams, the Bleuets and Cadets. The Bleuets was a kind of French "B"-team, while the Cadets consisted of young French promises.

== Teams ==
The big cycling nations in 1938, Belgium, Italy, Germany and France, each sent a team of 12 cyclists. Other countries, Spain, Luxembourg, Switzerland and the Netherlands, sent smaller teams of six cyclists each. The French had two extra teams of 12 cyclists, the Cadets and Bleuets.

The three most powerful teams were the Belgian, the French and the Italian national team. The Italian team was led by Bartali, who had been close to winning the Tour de France in 1937 until he crashed. The Italian cycling federation had requested him to skip the 1938 Giro d'Italia so he could focus on the Tour de France.

The teams entering the race were:

- Belgium
- Italy
- Germany
- France
- Spain
- Switzerland
- Netherlands
- Luxembourg
- France Cadets
- France Bleuets

== Route and stages ==
The highest point of elevation in the race was 2,770 m (9,090 ft) at the summit of the Col de l'Iseran mountain pass on stage 15.

Stage characteristics and winners
Stage	Date	Course	Distance	Type (Note: The icons shown here indicate whether the stage was run as a time trial, the stage was flat or the stage included mountains for the mountains classification.)	Winner
1	5 July	Paris to Caen	215 km (134 mi)	Plain stage	Willi Oberbeck (GER)
2	6 July	Caen to Saint-Brieuc	237 km (147 mi)	Plain stage	Jean Majerus (LUX)
3	7 July	Saint-Brieuc to Nantes	238 km (148 mi)	Plain stage	Gerrit Schulte (NED)
4a	8 July	Nantes to La Roche-sur-Yon	62 km (39 mi)	Plain stage	Éloi Meulenberg (BEL)
4b	8 July	La Roche-sur-Yon to La Rochelle	83 km (52 mi)	Plain stage	Éloi Meulenberg (BEL)
4c	8 July	La Rochelle to Royan	83 km (52 mi)	Plain stage	Félicien Vervaecke (BEL)
	9 July	Royan		Rest day	
5	10 July	Royan to Bordeaux	198 km (123 mi)	Plain stage	Éloi Meulenberg (BEL)
6a	11 July	Bordeaux to Arcachon	53 km (33 mi)	Plain stage	Jules Rossi (ITA)
6b	11 July	Arcachon to Bayonne	171 km (106 mi)	Plain stage	Glauco Servadei (ITA)
7	12 July	Bayonne to Pau	115 km (71 mi)	Plain stage	Theo Middelkamp (NED)
	13 July	Pau		Rest day	
8	14 July	Pau to Luchon	193 km (120 mi)	Stage with mountain(s)	Félicien Vervaecke (BEL)
	15 July	Luchon		Rest day	
9	16 July	Luchon to Perpignan	260 km (160 mi)	Stage with mountain(s)	Jean Fréchaut (FRA)
10a	17 July	Perpignan to Narbonne	63 km (39 mi)	Plain stage	Antoon van Schendel (NED)
10b	17 July	Narbonne to Béziers	27 km (17 mi)	Individual time trial	Félicien Vervaecke (BEL)
10c	17 July	Béziers to Montpellier	73 km (45 mi)	Plain stage	Antonin Magne (FRA)
11	18 July	Montpellier to Marseille	223 km (139 mi)	Plain stage	Gino Bartali (ITA)
12	19 July	Marseille to Cannes	199 km (124 mi)	Plain stage	Jean Fréchaut (FRA)
	20 July	Cannes		Rest day	
13	21 July	Cannes to Digne	284 km (176 mi)	Stage with mountain(s)	Dante Gianello (FRA)
14	22 July	Digne to Briançon	219 km (136 mi)	Stage with mountain(s)	Gino Bartali (ITA)
15	23 July	Briançon to Aix-les-Bains	311 km (193 mi)	Stage with mountain(s)	Marcel Kint (BEL)
	24 July	Aix-les-Bains		Rest day	
16	25 July	Aix-les-Bains to Besançon	284 km (176 mi)	Stage with mountain(s)	Marcel Kint (BEL)
17a	26 July	Besançon to Belfort	89 km (55 mi)	Plain stage	Émile Masson Jr. (BEL)
17b	26 July	Belfort to Strasbourg	143 km (89 mi)	Plain stage	Jean Fréchaut (FRA)
18	27 July	Strasbourg to Metz	186 km (116 mi)	Plain stage	Marcel Kint (BEL)
19	28 July	Metz to Reims	196 km (122 mi)	Plain stage	Fabien Galateau (FRA)
	28 July	Reims		Rest day	
20a	30 July	Reims to Laon	48 km (30 mi)	Plain stage	Glauco Servadei (ITA)
20b	30 July	Laon to Saint-Quentin	42 km (26 mi)	Individual time trial	Félicien Vervaecke (BEL)
20c	30 July	Saint-Quentin to Lille	107 km (66 mi)	Plain stage	François Neuville (BEL)
21	31 July	Lille to Paris	279 km (173 mi)	Plain stage	Antonin Magne (FRA); André Leducq (FRA) (Note: Magne and Leducq were both declared winners of stage 21.)
	Total		4,694 km (2,917 mi)		

== Race overview ==
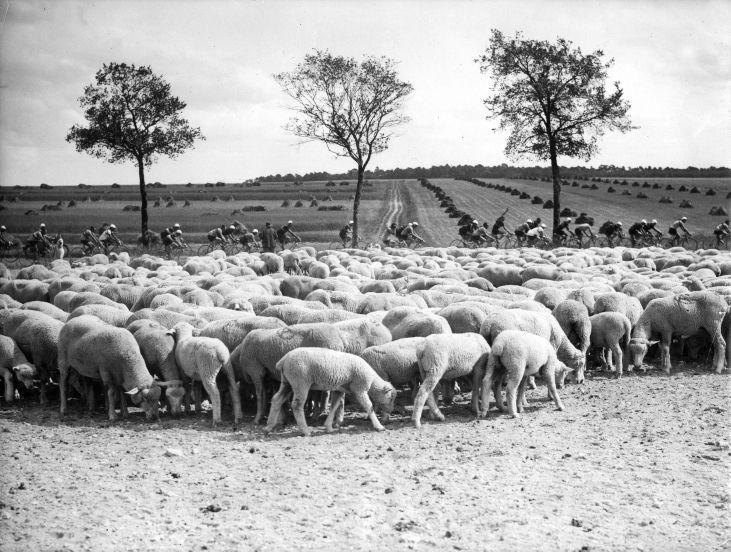
Cyclists passing a herd of sheep

Before the Pyrenees, all the favourites remained calm. André Leducq did not lose much time in the first stages, and when he got in a breakaway in the second part of the sixth stage, he took over the lead from Jean Majerus. In the eighth stage, Gino Bartali attacked, and dropped everybody. On the descent of the Col d'Aspin, his wheel collapsed, and Félicien Vervaecke and Ward Vissers overtook him. Bartali came back to finish in third place, but Vervaecke took the lead in the general classification. In that stage, former winner Georges Speicher was caught holding on to a car, and was removed from the race.

After that stage, Bartali was in second place in the general classification. He won some time on Vervaecke because of bonifications for reaching the tops of the Portet d'Aspet and the Braus first and winning the 11th stage, but lost some time in the individual time trial in stage 10b.

In the fourteenth stage, Bartali attacked again, and gained 17 minutes on Vervaecke and 20 on Vissers. Bartali was now leader of the race. Before the next stage, Bartali felt poorly. His team director, Costante Girardengo, told him not to force himself. Bartali let the others get away on the first mountains, but during the descent of the Iseran, Bartali went as fast as he could, and caught up with and overtook the group. During that stage, Mathias Clemens, who started the stage in second place, lost a lot of time, so Vervaecke was back in second place, 20 minutes behind Bartali.

For the rest of the race, Bartali defended his lead with ease. Vervaecke won back some time in the last individual time trial, but that was not enough to endanger Bartali's lead.

In the last stage, Antonin Magne (winner of the Tour de France in 1931 and 1934) and André Leducq (winner of the Tour de France in 1930 and 1932) escaped together, and crossed the finish line together. The Tour jury declared them both winner. This was Leducq's 25th and final stage victory. For both cyclists it was also the last stage they ever rode in the Tour de France.

== Classification leadership and minor prizes ==
The time that each cyclist required to finish each stage was recorded, and these times were added together for the general classification. If a cyclist had received a time bonus, it was subtracted from this total; all time penalties were added to this total. The cyclist with the least accumulated time was the race leader, identified by the yellow jersey.

For the mountains classification, 12 mountains were selected by the Tour organisation. The Iseran was included for the first time in 1938. On the top of these mountains, ten points were given for the first cyclist to pass, nine points to the second cyclist, and so on, until the tenth cyclist who got one point. The mountains classification in 1938 was won by Gino Bartali. Bartali was the first cyclist to win the general classification and the mountains classification of the Tour de France in the same year.

The team classification was calculated in 1938 by adding up the times of the best three cyclists of a team; the team with the least time was the winner. In 1938, there were eight teams of twelve cyclists. Belgium, Italy, Germany and France had a team, Luxembourg and Switzerland both supplied six cyclists for a combined team, as did Spain and the Netherlands, and there were two extra French teams, the bleuets and the cadets. The bleuets were also described as "France B", and the cadets as "France C".

Classification leadership by stage
Stage	Winner	General classification	Mountains classification (Note: No jersey was awarded to the leader of the mountains classification until a white jersey with red polka dots was introduced in 1975.)	Team classification
1	Willi Oberbeck	Willi Oberbeck	no award	Germany
2	Jean Majerus	Jean Majerus	no award	France
3	Gerrit Schulte	Jean Majerus	no award	France
4a	Éloi Meulenberg	Jean Majerus	no award	France
4b	Éloi Meulenberg	Jean Majerus	no award	France
4c	Félicien Vervaecke	Jean Majerus	no award	France
5	Éloi Meulenberg	Jean Majerus	no award	France
6a	Jules Rossi	Jean Majerus	no award	France
6b	Glauco Servadei	André Leducq	no award	France
7	Theo Middelkamp	André Leducq	no award	France
8	Félicien Vervaecke	Félicien Vervaecke	Gino Bartali	Belgium
9	Jean Fréchaut	Félicien Vervaecke	Gino Bartali	Belgium
10a	Antoon van Schendel	Félicien Vervaecke	Gino Bartali	Belgium
10b	Félicien Vervaecke	Félicien Vervaecke	Gino Bartali	Belgium
10c	Antonin Magne	Félicien Vervaecke	Gino Bartali	Belgium
11	Gino Bartali	Félicien Vervaecke	Gino Bartali	Belgium
12	Jean Fréchaut	Félicien Vervaecke	Gino Bartali	Belgium
13	Dante Gianello	Félicien Vervaecke	Gino Bartali	Belgium
14	Gino Bartali	Gino Bartali	Gino Bartali	Belgium
15	Marcel Kint	Gino Bartali	Gino Bartali	Belgium
16	Marcel Kint	Gino Bartali	Gino Bartali	Belgium
17a	Émile Masson Jr.	Gino Bartali	Gino Bartali	Belgium
17b	Jean Fréchaut	Gino Bartali	Gino Bartali	Belgium
18	Marcel Kint	Gino Bartali	Gino Bartali	Belgium
19	Fabien Galateau	Gino Bartali	Gino Bartali	Belgium
20a	Glauco Servadei	Gino Bartali	Gino Bartali	Belgium
20b	Félicien Vervaecke	Gino Bartali	Gino Bartali	Belgium
20c	François Neuville	Gino Bartali	Gino Bartali	Belgium
21	Antonin Magne; André Leducq	Gino Bartali	Gino Bartali	Belgium
Final		Gino Bartali	Gino Bartali	Belgium

== Final standings ==
=== General classification ===
Final general classification (1–10)
Rank	Rider	Team	Time
1	Gino Bartali (ITA)	Italy	148h 29' 12"
2	Félicien Vervaecke (BEL)	Belgium	+ 18' 27"
3	Victor Cosson (FRA)	France	+ 29' 26"
4	Ward Vissers (BEL)	Belgium	+ 35' 08"
5	Matt Clemens (LUX)	Luxembourg	+ 42' 08"
6	Mario Vicini (ITA)	Italy	+ 44' 59"
7	Jules Lowie (BEL)	Belgium	+ 48' 56"
8	Antonin Magne (FRA)	France	+ 49' 00"
9	Marcel Kint (BEL)	Belgium	+ 59' 49"
10	Dante Gianello (FRA)	Bleuets	+ 1h 06' 47"

Final general classification (11–55)
Rank	Rider	Team	Time
11	Jean-Marie Goasmat (FRA)	France	+ 1h 07' 34"
12	Albertin Disseaux (BEL)	Belgium	+ 1h 12' 16"
13	Robert Tanneveau (FRA)	Cadets	+ 1h 13' 54"
14	Sylvère Maes (BEL)	Belgium	+ 1h 21' 11"
15	Pierre Gallien (FRA)	France	+ 1h 24' 34"
16	Mariano Cañardo (ESP)	Spain	+ 1h 26' 48"
17	François Neuville (BEL)	Belgium	+ 1h 35' 43"
18	Jean Fréchaut (FRA)	France	+ 1h 37' 24"
19	Rafael Ramos (ESP)	Spain	+ 1h 37' 40"
20	Glauco Servadei (ITA)	Italy	+ 1h 41' 38"
21	Otto Weckerling (GER)	Germany	+ 1h 42' 27"
22	Raymond Passat (FRA)	Cadets	+ 1h 47' 19"
23	Yvan Marie (FRA)	Cadets	+ 1h 49' 49"
24	Jean Fontenay (FRA)	Cadets	+ 1h 50' 04"
25	Giordano Cottur (ITA)	Italy	+ 1h 50' 08"
26	Raymond Louviot (FRA)	Cadets	+ 1h 50' 21"
27	Giuseppe Martano (ITA)	Italy	+ 1h 52' 31"
28	Fabien Galateau (FRA)	Cadets	+ 1h 52' 43"
29	Julián Berrendero (ESP)	Spain	+ 1h 53' 31"
30	André Leducq (FRA)	Cadets	+ 1h 53' 42"
31	Paul Egli (SUI)	Switzerland	+ 2h 00' 06"
32	Arsène Mersch (LUX)	Luxembourg	+ 2h 03' 16"
33	Vasco Bergamaschi (ITA)	Italy	+ 2h 07' 07"
34	Émile Masson jr (BEL)	Belgium	+ 2h 13' 39"
35	Albert Bourlon (FRA)	Bleuets	+ 2h 18' 00"
36	Lucien Le Guével (FRA)	Bleuets	+ 2h 22' 33"
37	François Neuens (LUX)	Luxembourg	+ 2h 23' 10"
38	Enrico Mollo (ITA)	Italy	+ 2h 24' 35"
39	Constant Lauwers (BEL)	Belgium	+ 2h 26' 28"
40	Oreste Bernardoni (FRA)	Bleuets	+ 2h 29' 34"
41	Robert Oubron (FRA)	Cadets	+ 2h 43' 41"
42	Camille Leroy (FRA)	Bleuets	+ 3h 02' 15"
43	Theo Middelkamp (NED)	Netherlands	+ 3h 02' 45"
44	Pierre Jaminet (FRA)	France	+ 3h 05' 40"
45	Josef Arents (GER)	Germany	+ 3h 15' 14"
46	Augusto Introzzi (ITA)	Italy	+ 3h 18' 59"
47	Bruno Carini (FRA)	Cadets	+ 3h 20' 52"
48	Aldo Bini (ITA)	Italy	+ 3h 20' 55"
49	Jean Majerus (LUX)	Luxembourg	+ 3h 22' 02"
50	Antoon Van Schendel (NED)	Netherlands	+ 3h 32' 24"
51	René Walschot (BEL)	Belgium	+ 3h 40' 43"
52	Herbert Hauswald (GER)	Germany	+ 3h 50' 46"
53	Reinhold Wendel (GER)	Germany	+ 3h 52' 57"
54	Nello Troggi (ITA)	Italy	+ 4h 18' 17"
55	Janus Hellemons (NED)	Netherlands	+ 5h 02' 34"

=== Mountains classification ===
Mountains in the mountains classification
Stage	Rider	Height	Mountain range	Winner
8	Aubisque	1,709 metres (5,607 ft)	Pyrenees	Gino Bartali
8	Tourmalet	2,115 metres (6,939 ft)	Pyrenees	Gino Bartali
8	Aspin	1,489 metres (4,885 ft)	Pyrenees	Gino Bartali
8	Peyresourde	1,569 metres (5,148 ft)	Pyrenees	Félicien Vervaecke
9	Portet d'Aspet	1,069 metres (3,507 ft)	Pyrenees	Gino Bartali
13	Braus	1,002 metres (3,287 ft)	Alps-Maritimes	Gino Bartali
14	Allos	2,250 metres (7,380 ft)	Alps	Gino Bartali
14	Vars	2,110 metres (6,920 ft)	Alps	Gino Bartali
14	Izoard	2,361 metres (7,746 ft)	Alps	Gino Bartali
15	Galibier	2,556 metres (8,386 ft)	Alps	Mario Vicini
15	Iseran	2,770 metres (9,090 ft)	Alps	Félicien Vervaecke
16	Faucille	1,320 metres (4,330 ft)	Alps	Gino Bartali

Final mountains classification (1–10)
Rank	Rider	Team	Points
1	Gino Bartali (ITA)	Italy	107
2	Félicien Vervaecke (BEL)	Belgium	79
3	Edward Vissers (BEL)	Belgium	76
4	Dante Gianello (FRA)	Bleuets	57
5	Victor Cosson (FRA)	France	55
6	Mario Vicini (ITA)	Italy	29
6	Julián Berrendero (ESP)	Spain	29
8	Sylvère Maes (BEL)	Belgium	28
9	Giuseppe Martano (ITA)	Italy	25
10	Jean-Marie Goasmat (FRA)	France	23

=== Team classification ===
Final team classification (1–8)
Rank	Team	Time
1	Belgium	447h 10' 07"
2	France	+ 43' 29"
3	Italy	+ 44' 06"
4	Luxembourg/Switzerland	+ 3h 02' 29"
5	Cadets	+ 3h 11' 31"
6	Spain/Netherlands	+ 3h 15' 29"
7	Bleuets	+ 4h 04' 49"
8	Germany	+ 7h 05' 57"

== Aftermath ==
Because of the political tensions in Europe before the Second World War, Italy did not send a team to the 1939 Tour de France, so Bartali was unable to defend his title. After the war, the Tour de France resumed in 1947. In 1948, Bartali won his second Tour, becoming the first and so far only cyclist to win editions of the Tour de France ten years apart.

== Bibliography ==
- Augendre, Jacques (2016). Guide historique [Historical guide] (PDF) (in French). Paris: Amaury Sport Organisation. Archived (PDF) from the original on 17 August 2016.
- McGann, Bill; McGann, Carol (2006). The Story of the Tour de France: 1903–1964. Vol. 1. Indianapolis, IN: Dog Ear Publishing. ISBN 978-1-59858-180-5.
- Moliterno, Gino (2000). Encyclopedia of Contemporary Italian Culture. Boca Raton, FL: CRC Press. ISBN 978-0-415-14584-8.
- Nauright, John; Parrish, Charles (2012). Sports Around the World: History, Culture, and Practice. Vol. 2. Santa Barbara, CA: ABC-CLIO. ISBN 978-1-59884-300-2.
