= List of teams and cyclists in the 1937 Tour de France =

List of cyclists

The Italian team, that had been absent in 1936, returned for the 1937 Tour de France, after Benito Mussolini removed their boycott of the Tour, and selected new star Gino Bartali, who had won the 1936 and 1937 Giro d'Italia, as the Italian team leader. The Italian team had 10 cyclists, just as the Belgian, German and French teams. There were also small teams of six cyclists: the Spanish, Dutch, Luxembourgian and Swiss teams. The last national team was the Great Britain-Canada team, consisting of two British cyclists and one Canadian.

The French team included Roger Lapébie. Lapébie had had a difficult relation with Desgrange. This had caused Lapébie to be out of the national team in 1935, and completely absent from the Tour in 1936. In 1937, Desgrange had retired, and Lapébie was back. In the month before the Tour started, Lapébie had undergone surgery for a lumbar hernia, and there were doubts about his form.

There were also 31 cyclists riding as individuals. These individuals were responsible for their own food and accommodation.

== By rider ==
Legend
No.	Starting number worn by the rider during the Tour
Pos.	Position in the general classification
DNF	Denotes a rider who did not finish

No.	Name	Nationality	Team	Pos.	Ref
1	Sylvère Maes	Belgium	Belgium	DNF	
2	Félicien Vervaecke	Belgium	Belgium	DNF	
3	Albert Hendrickx	Belgium	Belgium	DNF	
4	Robert Wierinckx	Belgium	Belgium	DNF	
5	Hubert Deltour	Belgium	Belgium	DNF	
6	Albertin Disseaux	Belgium	Belgium	DNF	
7	Gustave Danneels	Belgium	Belgium	DNF	
8	Jules Lowie	Belgium	Belgium	DNF	
9	Marcel Kint	Belgium	Belgium	DNF	
10	Éloi Meulenberg	Belgium	Belgium	DNF	
11	Gino Bartali	Italy	Italy	DNF	
12	Jules Rossi	Italy	Italy	DNF	
13	Giuseppe Martano	Italy	Italy	24	
14	Marco Cimatti	Italy	Italy	DNF	
15	Glauco Servadei	Italy	Italy	DNF	
16	Carlo Romanatti	Italy	Italy	36	
17	Walter Generati	Italy	Italy	DNF	
18	Augusto Introzzi	Italy	Italy	26	
19	Giovanni Valetti	Italy	Italy	DNF	
20	Francesco Camusso	Italy	Italy	4	
21	Oskar Thierbach	Germany	Germany	14	
22	Ludwig Geyer	Germany	Germany	28	
23	Otto Weckerling	Germany	Germany	41	
24	Erich Bautz	Germany	Germany	9	
25	Heinrich Schultenjohann	Germany	Germany	DNF	
26	Heinz Wengler	Germany	Germany	37	
27	Reinhold Wendel	Germany	Germany	45	
28	Hermann Schild	Germany	Germany	DNF	
29	Willi Oberbeck	Germany	Germany	DNF	
30	Herbert Hauswald	Germany	Germany	43	
31	Paul Chocque	France	France	7	
32	Roger Lapébie	France	France	1	
33	René Le Grevès	France	France	DNF	
34	Émile Gamard	France	France	44	
35	Pierre Cloarec	France	France	32	
36	Maurice Archambaud	France	France	DNF	
37	Georges Speicher	France	France	DNF	
38	Louis Thiétard	France	France	DNF	
39	Robert Tanneveau	France	France	21	
40	Sylvain Marcaillou	France	France	5	
41	Mariano Cañardo	Spain	Spain	30	
42	Julián Berrendero	Spain	Spain	15	
43	Antonio Prior	Spain	Spain	DNF	
44	Fédérico Ezquerra	Spain	Spain	DNF	
45	Rafael Ramos	Spain	Spain	DNF	
46	Juan Gimeno	Spain	Spain	DNF	
47	Albert van Schendel	Netherlands	Netherlands	DNF	
48	Theo Middelkamp	Netherlands	Netherlands	DNF	
49	Antoon van Schendel	Netherlands	Netherlands	33	
50	John Braspennincx	Netherlands	Netherlands	DNF	
51	Gerrit Van De Ruit	Netherlands	Netherlands	DNF	
52	Piet van Nek	Netherlands	Netherlands	DNF	
53	Pierre Clemens	Luxembourg	Luxembourg	DNF	
54	Arsène Mersch	Luxembourg	Luxembourg	27	
55	Mathias Clemens	Luxembourg	Luxembourg	DNF	
56	Jean Majerus	Luxembourg	Luxembourg	DNF	
57	François Neuens	Luxembourg	Luxembourg	38	
58	Aloyse Klensch	Luxembourg	Luxembourg	46	
59	Robert Zimmermann	Switzerland	Switzerland	31	
60	René Pedroli	Switzerland	Switzerland	39	
61	Leo Amberg	Switzerland	Switzerland	3	
62	Fritz Saladin	Switzerland	Switzerland	DNF	
63	Gottlieb Weber	Switzerland	Switzerland	DNF	
64	Paul Egli	Switzerland	Switzerland	29	
65	Charlie Holland	Great Britain	Great Britain/Canada	DNF	
66	Bill Burl	Great Britain	Great Britain/Canada	DNF	
66	Pierre Gachon	Canada	Great Britain/Canada	DNF	
101	Adolph Braeckeveldt	Belgium	Touriste-routier	22	
102	Gustaaf Deloor	Belgium	Touriste-routier	16	
103	Herbert Muller	Belgium	Touriste-routier	11	
104	Edward Vissers	Belgium	Touriste-routier	6	
105	Edoardo Molinar	Italy	Touriste-routier	DNF	
106	Mario Vicini	Italy	Touriste-routier	2	
107	Settimio Simonini	Italy	Touriste-routier	DNF	
108	Ambrogio Morelli	Italy	Touriste-routier	DNF	
109	Pierre Allès	France	Touriste-routier	DNF	
110	Pierre Cento	France	Touriste-routier	DNF	
111	André Auville	France	Touriste-routier	DNF	
112	André Bramard	France	Touriste-routier	DNF	
113	Maurice Cacheux	France	Touriste-routier	DNF	
114	Bruno Carini	France	Touriste-routier	42	
115	Victor Cosson	France	Touriste-routier	17	
116	Gabriel Dubois	France	Touriste-routier	34	
117	Sauveur Ducazeaux	France	Touriste-routier	19	
118	Jean Fréchaut	France	Touriste-routier	10	
119	Fabien Galateau	France	Touriste-routier	25	
120	Pierre Gallien	France	Touriste-routier	8	
121	Jean-Marie Goasmat	France	Touriste-routier	18	
122	Robert Godard	France	Touriste-routier	DNF	
123	Jean Goujon	France	Touriste-routier	35	
124	Marcel Laurent	France	Touriste-routier	13	
125	Raymond Lemarié	France	Touriste-routier	40	
126	Paul Maye	France	Touriste-routier	DNF	
127	Robert Oubron	France	Touriste-routier	20	
128	Raymond Passat	France	Touriste-routier	12	
129	Henri Puppo	France	Touriste-routier	23	
130	Joseph Soffietti	France	Touriste-routier	DNF	
134	Alphonse Antoine	France	Touriste-routier	DNF	
