= 1937 Tour de France, Stage 1 to Stage 12b =

Cycling race stages

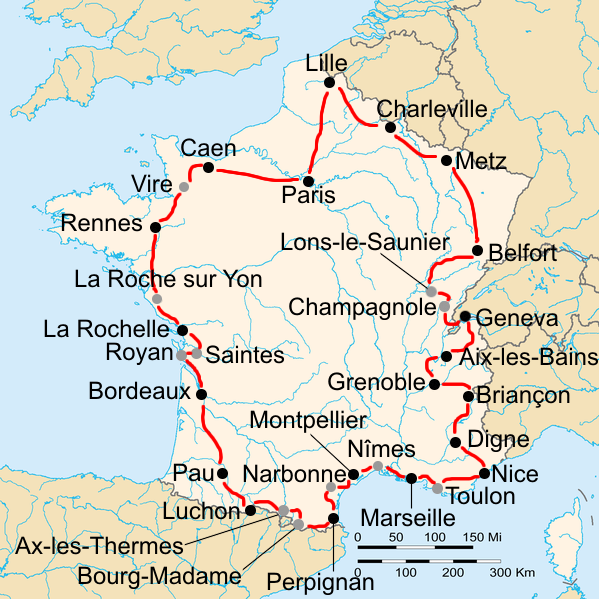
Route of the 1937 Tour de France

The 1937 Tour de France was the 31st edition of the Tour de France, one of cycling's Grand Tours. The Tour began in Paris with a flat stage on 30 June, and Stage 12b occurred on 14 July with a flat stage to Montpellier. The race finished in Paris on 25 July.

== Stage 1 ==
30 June 1937 – Paris to Lille, 263 km (163 mi)

Stage 1 result and general classification after stage 1

| Rank | Rider | Team | Time |
|---|---|---|---|
| 1 | Jean Majerus (LUX) | Switzerland | 6h 57' 48" |
| 2 | Arsène Mersch (LUX) | Luxembourg | + 57" |
| 3 | Adolph Braeckeveldt (BEL) | Touriste-routier | s.t. |
| 4 | Oskar Thierbach (GER) | Germany | + 1' 06" |
| 5 | Hubert Deltour (BEL) | Belgium | + 1' 46" |
| 6 | Albertin Disseaux (BEL) | Belgium | s.t. |
| 7 | Pierre Clemens (LUX) | Luxembourg | s.t. |
| 8 | Paul Egli (SUI) | Switzerland | s.t. |
| 9 | Herbert Muller (BEL) | Touriste-routier | s.t. |
| 10 | Marcel Kint (BEL) | Belgium | s.t. |

== Stage 2 ==
1 July 1937 – Lille to Charleville, 192 km (119 mi)

Stage 2 result

| Rank | Rider | Team | Time |
|---|---|---|---|
| 1 | Maurice Archambaud (FRA) | France | 5h 18' 31" |
| 2 | Robert Godard (FRA) | Touriste-routier | s.t. |
| 3 | Adolph Braeckeveldt (BEL) | Touriste-routier | + 1' 07" |
| 4 | Gustaaf Deloor (BEL) | Touriste-routier | s.t. |
| 5 | Marcel Kint (BEL) | Belgium | s.t. |
| =6 | Sylvère Maes (BEL) | Belgium | + 1' 31" |
| =6 | Félicien Vervaecke (BEL) | Belgium | s.t. |
| =6 | Albert Hendrickx (BEL) | Belgium | s.t. |
| =6 | Robert Wierinckx (BEL) | Belgium | s.t. |
| =6 | Éloi Meulenberg (BEL) | Belgium | s.t. |

General classification after stage 2

| Rank | Rider | Team | Time |
|---|---|---|---|
| 1 | Jean Majerus (LUX) | Luxembourg | |
| 2 | Maurice Archambaud (FRA) | France | + 1' 49" |
| 3 | Arsène Mersch (LUX) | Luxembourg | + 2' 39" |
| 4 | | | |
| 5 | | | |
| 6 | | | |
| 7 | | | |
| 8 | | | |
| 9 | | | |
| 10 | | | |

== Stage 3 ==
2 July 1937 – Charleville to Metz, 161 km (100 mi)

Stage 3 result

| Rank | Rider | Team | Time |
|---|---|---|---|
| 1 | Walter Generati (ITA) | Italy | 4h 13' 02" |
| 2 | Jean Fréchaut (FRA) | Touriste-routier | + 34" |
| 3 | Marcel Kint (BEL) | Belgium | s.t. |
| 4 | Paul Chocque (FRA) | France | s.t. |
| 5 | Albert van Schendel (NED) | Netherlands | s.t. |
| 6 | Robert Godard (FRA) | Touriste-routier | s.t. |
| 7 | Robert Zimmermann (SUI) | Switzerland | s.t. |
| 8 | Robert Tanneveau (FRA) | France | s.t. |
| 9 | Mario Vicini (ITA) | Touriste-routier | s.t. |
| 10 | Henri Puppo (FRA) | Touriste-routier | + 4' 16" |

General classification after stage 3

| Rank | Rider | Team | Time |
|---|---|---|---|
| 1 | Marcel Kint (BEL) | Belgium | |
| 2 | Jean Majerus (LUX) | Luxembourg | + 2' 50" |
| 3 | Maurice Archambaud (FRA) | France | + 2' 54" |
| 4 | | | |
| 5 | | | |
| 6 | | | |
| 7 | | | |
| 8 | | | |
| 9 | | | |
| 10 | | | |

== Stage 4 ==
3 July 1937 – Metz to Belfort, 220 km (140 mi)

Stage 4 result

| Rank | Rider | Team | Time |
|---|---|---|---|
| 1 | Erich Bautz (GER) | Germany | 6h 28' 56" |
| 2 | Gino Bartali (ITA) | Italy | + 3' 45" |
| 3 | Leo Amberg (SUI) | Switzerland | + 4' 29" |
| 4 | Maurice Archambaud (FRA) | France | s.t. |
| 5 | Paul Egli (SUI) | Switzerland | s.t. |
| 6 | Fabien Galateau (FRA) | Touriste-routier | + 4' 39" |
| 7 | Edward Vissers (BEL) | Touriste-routier | + 5' 36" |
| 8 | Jules Lowie (BEL) | Belgium | + 6' 07" |
| =9 | Adolph Braeckeveldt (BEL) | Touriste-routier | + 6' 35" |
| =9 | Sylvain Marcaillou (FRA) | France | s.t. |

General classification after stage 4

| Rank | Rider | Team | Time |
|---|---|---|---|
| 1 | Erich Bautz (GER) | Germany | |
| 2 | Maurice Archambaud (FRA) | France | + 6' 22" |
| 3 | Gino Bartali (ITA) | Italy | + 10' 06" |
| 4 | | | |
| 5 | | | |
| 6 | | | |
| 7 | | | |
| 8 | | | |
| 9 | | | |
| 10 | | | |

== Stage 5a ==
4 July 1937 – Belfort to Lons-le-Saunier, 175 km (109 mi)

Stage 5a result

| Rank | Rider | Team | Time |
|---|---|---|---|
| 1 | Henri Puppo (FRA) | Touriste-routier | 5h 36' 15" |
| 2 | Julián Berrendero (ESP) | Spain | s.t. |
| 3 | Jules Rossi (ITA) | Italy | + 40" |
| 4 | Fabien Galateau (FRA) | Touriste-routier | s.t. |
| 5 | Raymond Lemarie (FRA) | Touriste-routier | s.t. |
| 6 | Francesco Camusso (ITA) | Italy | s.t. |
| 7 | Rafael Ramos (ESP) | Spain | s.t. |
| 8 | Oskar Thierbach (GER) | Germany | s.t. |
| 9 | Roger Lapébie (FRA) | France | s.t. |
| 10 | Gustave Danneels (BEL) | Belgium | + 1' 46" |

General classification after stage 5a

| Rank | Rider | Team | Time |
|---|---|---|---|
| 1 | Erich Bautz (GER) | Germany | |
| 2 | Maurice Archambaud (FRA) | France | + 6' 22" |
| 3 | Gino Bartali (ITA) | Italy | + 10' 06" |
| 4 | | | |
| 5 | | | |
| 6 | | | |
| 7 | | | |
| 8 | | | |
| 9 | | | |
| 10 | | | |

== Stage 5b ==
4 July 1937 – Lons-le-Saunier to Champagnole, 34 km (21 mi) (TTT)

Stage 5b result

| Rank | Rider | Team | Time |
|---|---|---|---|
| 1 | Sylvère Maes (BEL) | Belgium | 55' 33" |
| 2 | Albert Hendrickx (BEL) | Belgium | s.t. |
| 3 | Gustave Danneels (BEL) | Belgium | s.t. |
| 4 | Jules Lowie (BEL) | Belgium | s.t. |
| 5 | Marcel Kint (BEL) | Belgium | s.t. |
| 6 | Albertin Disseaux (BEL) | Belgium | s.t. |
| 7 | Paul Chocque (FRA) | France | + 30" |
| 8 | Maurice Archambaud (FRA) | France | s.t. |
| 9 | Roger Lapébie (FRA) | France | s.t. |
| 10 | René Le Grevès (FRA) | France | s.t. |

General classification after stage 5b

| Rank | Rider | Team | Time |
|---|---|---|---|
| 1 | Erich Bautz (GER) | Germany | |
| 2 | Maurice Archambaud (FRA) | France | + 5' 57" |
| 3 | Gino Bartali (ITA) | Italy | + 9' 48" |
| 4 | | | |
| 5 | | | |
| 6 | | | |
| 7 | | | |
| 8 | | | |
| 9 | | | |
| 10 | | | |

== Stage 5c ==
4 July 1937 – Champagnole to Geneva, 93 km (58 mi)

Stage 5c result

| Rank | Rider | Team | Time |
|---|---|---|---|
| 1 | Leo Amberg (SUI) | Switzerland | 2h 28' 29" |
| 2 | Robert Zimmermann (SUI) | Switzerland | + 1' 45" |
| 3 | Georges Speicher (FRA) | France | + 2' 24" |
| 4 | Erich Bautz (GER) | Germany | s.t. |
| 5 | Edward Vissers (BEL) | Touriste-routier | s.t. |
| 6 | Pierre Gallien (FRA) | Touriste-routier | s.t. |
| 7 | Victor Cosson (FRA) | Touriste-routier | s.t. |
| 8 | Jean-Marie Goasmat (FRA) | Touriste-routier | s.t. |
| 9 | Francesco Camusso (ITA) | Italy | s.t. |
| 10 | Adolph Braeckeveldt (BEL) | Touriste-routier | s.t. |

General classification after stage 5c

| Rank | Rider | Team | Time |
|---|---|---|---|
| 1 | Erich Bautz (GER) | Germany | |
| 2 | Maurice Archambaud (FRA) | France | + 8' 12" |
| 3 | Leo Amberg (SUI) | Switzerland | + 10' 57" |
| 4 | | | |
| 5 | | | |
| 6 | | | |
| 7 | | | |
| 8 | | | |
| 9 | | | |
| 10 | | | |

== Rest day 1 ==
5 July 1937 – Geneva

== Stage 6 ==
6 July 1937 – Geneva to Aix-les-Bains, 180 km (110 mi)

Stage 6 result

| Rank | Rider | Team | Time |
|---|---|---|---|
| 1 | Gustaaf Deloor (BEL) | Touriste-routier | 5h 26' 25" |
| 2 | Sylvain Marcaillou (FRA) | France | s.t. |
| =3 | Sylvère Maes (BEL) | Belgium | s.t. |
| =3 | Félicien Vervaecke (BEL) | Belgium | s.t. |
| =3 | Albertin Disseaux (BEL) | Belgium | s.t. |
| =3 | Marcel Kint (BEL) | Belgium | s.t. |
| =3 | Gino Bartali (ITA) | Italy | s.t. |
| =3 | Francesco Camusso (ITA) | Italy | s.t. |
| =3 | Erich Bautz (GER) | Germany | s.t. |
| =3 | Paul Chocque (FRA) | France | s.t. |

General classification after stage 6

| Rank | Rider | Team | Time |
|---|---|---|---|
| 1 | Erich Bautz (GER) | Germany | |
| 2 | Leo Amberg (SUI) | Switzerland | + 10' 57" |
| 3 | Gino Bartali (ITA) | Italy | + 12' 03" |
| 4 | | | |
| 5 | | | |
| 6 | | | |
| 7 | | | |
| 8 | | | |
| 9 | | | |
| 10 | | | |

== Stage 7 ==
7 July 1937 – Aix-les-Bains to Grenoble, 228 km (142 mi)

Stage 7 result

| Rank | Rider | Team | Time |
|---|---|---|---|
| 1 | Gino Bartali (ITA) | Italy | 8h 02' 57" |
| 2 | Francesco Camusso (ITA) | Italy | + 1' 53" |
| 3 | Roger Lapébie (FRA) | France | + 2' 38" |
| 4 | Sylvain Marcaillou (FRA) | France | s.t. |
| 5 | Marcel Laurent (FRA) | Touriste-routier | s.t. |
| 6 | Pierre Gallien (FRA) | Touriste-routier | s.t. |
| 7 | Jean Fréchaut (FRA) | Touriste-routier | s.t. |
| 8 | Edward Vissers (BEL) | Touriste-routier | s.t. |
| 9 | Fabien Galateau (FRA) | Touriste-routier | s.t. |
| 10 | Settimio Simonini (ITA) | Touriste-routier | + 4' 47" |

General classification after stage 7

| Rank | Rider | Team | Time |
|---|---|---|---|
| 1 | Gino Bartali (ITA) | Italy | |
| 2 | Edward Vissers (BEL) | Touriste-routier | + 9' 18" |
| 3 | Erich Bautz (GER) | Germany | + 9' 55" |
| 4 | | | |
| 5 | | | |
| 6 | | | |
| 7 | | | |
| 8 | | | |
| 9 | | | |
| 10 | | | |

== Stage 8 ==
8 July 1937 – Grenoble to Briançon, 194 km (121 mi)

Stage 8 result

| Rank | Rider | Team | Time |
|---|---|---|---|
| 1 | Otto Weckerling (GER) | Germany | 5h 55' 45" |
| 2 | Leo Amberg (SUI) | Switzerland | + 29" |
| 3 | Mario Vicini (ITA) | Touriste-routier | s.t. |
| 4 | Adolph Braeckeveldt (BEL) | Touriste-routier | s.t. |
| 5 | Sylvère Maes (BEL) | Belgium | s.t. |
| 6 | Erich Bautz (GER) | Germany | s.t. |
| 7 | Sylvain Marcaillou (FRA) | France | s.t. |
| 8 | Victor Cosson (FRA) | Touriste-routier | s.t. |
| 9 | Oskar Thierbach (GER) | Germany | s.t. |
| 10 | Herbert Muller (BEL) | Touriste-routier | s.t. |

General classification after stage 8

| Rank | Rider | Team | Time |
|---|---|---|---|
| 1 | Gino Bartali (ITA) | Italy | |
| 2 | Erich Bautz (GER) | Germany | + 2' 05" |
| 3 | Leo Amberg (SUI) | Switzerland | + 5' 17" |
| 4 | | | |
| 5 | | | |
| 6 | | | |
| 7 | | | |
| 8 | | | |
| 9 | | | |
| 10 | | | |

== Stage 9 ==
9 July 1937 – Briançon to Digne, 220 km (140 mi)

Stage 9 result

| Rank | Rider | Team | Time |
|---|---|---|---|
| 1 | Roger Lapébie (FRA) | France | 7h 27' 43" |
| 2 | Félicien Vervaecke (BEL) | Belgium | + 2' 47" |
| 3 | Pierre Gallien (FRA) | Touriste-routier | s.t. |
| 4 | Jules Lowie (BEL) | Belgium | + 3' 16" |
| 5 | Mario Vicini (ITA) | Touriste-routier | + 3' 28" |
| 6 | Edward Vissers (BEL) | Touriste-routier | s.t. |
| 7 | Albertin Disseaux (BEL) | Belgium | s.t. |
| 8 | Sylvère Maes (BEL) | Belgium | s.t. |
| 9 | Henri Puppo (FRA) | Touriste-routier | + 11' 02" |
| 10 | Arsène Mersch (LUX) | Luxembourg | s.t. |

General classification after stage 9

| Rank | Rider | Team | Time |
|---|---|---|---|
| 1 | Sylvère Maes (BEL) | Belgium | |
| 2 | Mario Vicini (ITA) | Touriste-routier | + 35" |
| 3 | Roger Lapébie (FRA) | France | + 1' 22" |
| 4 | | | |
| 5 | | | |
| 6 | | | |
| 7 | | | |
| 8 | | | |
| 9 | | | |
| 10 | | | |

== Rest day 2 ==
17 July 1937 – Digne

== Stage 10 ==
11 July 1937 – Digne to Nice, 251 km (156 mi)

Stage 10 result

| Rank | Rider | Team | Time |
|---|---|---|---|
| 1 | Félicien Vervaecke (BEL) | Belgium | 8h 29' 19" |
| 2 | Bruno Carini (FRA) | Touriste-routier | + 36" |
| 3 | Fédérico Ezquerra (ESP) | Spain | + 1' 27" |
| 4 | Gino Bartali (ITA) | Italy | + 1' 46" |
| 5 | Mario Vicini (ITA) | Touriste-routier | s.t. |
| 6 | Roger Lapébie (FRA) | France | s.t. |
| 7 | Fabien Galateau (FRA) | Touriste-routier | s.t. |
| 8 | Mariano Cañardo (ESP) | Spain | s.t. |
| 9 | Pierre Gallien (FRA) | Touriste-routier | s.t. |
| 10 | Marcel Laurent (FRA) | Touriste-routier | s.t. |

General classification after stage 10

| Rank | Rider | Team | Time |
|---|---|---|---|
| 1 | Sylvère Maes (BEL) | Belgium | |
| 2 | Mario Vicini (ITA) | Touriste-routier | + 35" |
| 3 | Roger Lapébie (FRA) | France | + 1' 22" |
| 4 | | | |
| 5 | | | |
| 6 | | | |
| 7 | | | |
| 8 | | | |
| 9 | | | |
| 10 | | | |

== Rest day 3 ==
12 July 1937 – Nice

== Stage 11a ==
13 July 1937 – Nice to Toulon, 169 km (105 mi)

Stage 11a result

| Rank | Rider | Team | Time |
|---|---|---|---|
| 1 | Éloi Meulenberg (BEL) | Belgium | 5h 25' 14" |
| 2 | Gustaaf Deloor (BEL) | Touriste-routier | s.t. |
| 3 | Heinz Wengler (GER) | Germany | s.t. |
| 4 | Raymond Lemarie (FRA) | Touriste-routier | + 28" |
| 5 | Alphonse Antoine (FRA) | Touriste-routier | s.t. |
| 6 | Victor Cosson (FRA) | Touriste-routier | s.t. |
| 7 | Herbert Muller (BEL) | Touriste-routier | + 1' 03" |
| 8 | Gustave Danneels (BEL) | Belgium | + 1' 51" |
| 9 | Robert Wierinckx (BEL) | Belgium | s.t. |
| 10 | Adolph Braeckeveldt (BEL) | Touriste-routier | s.t. |

General classification after stage 11a

| Rank | Rider | Team | Time |
|---|---|---|---|
| 1 | Sylvère Maes (BEL) | Belgium | |
| 2 | Mario Vicini (ITA) | Touriste-routier | + 35" |
| 3 | Roger Lapébie (FRA) | France | + 1' 22" |
| 4 | | | |
| 5 | | | |
| 6 | | | |
| 7 | | | |
| 8 | | | |
| 9 | | | |
| 10 | | | |

== Stage 11b ==
13 July 1937 – Toulon to Marseille, 65 km (40 mi) (TTT)

Stage 11b result

| Rank | Rider | Team | Time |
|---|---|---|---|
| 1 | Gustave Danneels (BEL) | Belgium | 1h 41' 09" |
| 2 | Sylvère Maes (BEL) | Belgium | s.t. |
| 3 | Félicien Vervaecke (BEL) | Belgium | s.t. |
| 4 | Jules Lowie (BEL) | Belgium | s.t. |
| 5 | Albertin Disseaux (BEL) | Belgium | s.t. |
| 6 | Leo Amberg (SUI) | Switzerland | + 1' 31" |
| 7 | Roger Lapébie (FRA) | France | s.t. |
| 8 | Erich Bautz (GER) | Germany | + 4' 24" |
| 9 | Julián Berrendero (ESP) | Spain | s.t. |
| 10 | Mariano Cañardo (ESP) | Spain | s.t. |

General classification after stage 11b

| Rank | Rider | Team | Time |
|---|---|---|---|
| 1 | Sylvère Maes (BEL) | Belgium | |
| 2 | Roger Lapébie (FRA) | France | + 2' 53" |
| 3 | Albertin Disseaux (BEL) | Belgium | + 5' 17" |
| 4 | | | |
| 5 | | | |
| 6 | | | |
| 7 | | | |
| 8 | | | |
| 9 | | | |
| 10 | | | |

== Stage 12a ==
14 July 1937 – Marseille to Nîmes, 112 km (70 mi)

Stage 12a result

| Rank | Rider | Team | Time |
|---|---|---|---|
| 1 | Alphonse Antoine (FRA) | Touriste-routier | 3h 39' 37" |
| 2 | Sylvain Marcaillou (FRA) | France | s.t. |
| 3 | Antoon van Schendel (NED) | Netherlands | s.t. |
| 4 | Augusto Introzzi (ITA) | Italy | s.t. |
| 5 | Robert Zimmermann (SUI) | Switzerland | s.t. |
| 6 | Jules Lowie (BEL) | Belgium | s.t. |
| 7 | Erich Bautz (GER) | Germany | + 9' 53" |
| 8 | Giuseppe Martano (ITA) | Italy | s.t. |
| 9 | Hubert Deltour (BEL) | Belgium | s.t. |
| 10 | Emile Gamard (FRA) | France | s.t. |

General classification after stage 12a

| Rank | Rider | Team | Time |
|---|---|---|---|
| 1 | Sylvère Maes (BEL) | Belgium | |
| 2 | Roger Lapébie (FRA) | France | + 2' 53" |
| 3 | Albertin Disseaux (BEL) | Belgium | + 5' 17" |
| 4 | | | |
| 5 | | | |
| 6 | | | |
| 7 | | | |
| 8 | | | |
| 9 | | | |
| 10 | | | |

== Stage 12b ==
14 July 1937 – Nîmes to Montpellier, 51 km (32 mi)

Stage 12b result

| Rank | Rider | Team | Time |
|---|---|---|---|
| 1 | René Pedroli (SUI) | Switzerland | 1h 16' 49" |
| 2 | Heinz Wengler (GER) | Germany | s.t. |
| 3 | Mariano Cañardo (ESP) | Spain | s.t. |
| 4 | Jean Goujon (FRA) | Touriste-routier | s.t. |
| =5 | Robert Tanneveau (FRA) | France | s.t. |
| =5 | Otto Weckerling (GER) | Germany | s.t. |
| =5 | Sylvain Marcaillou (FRA) | France | s.t. |
| =5 | Sauveur Ducazeaux (FRA) | Touriste-routier | s.t. |
| =5 | Antoon van Schendel (NED) | Netherlands | s.t. |
| =5 | Raymond Passat (FRA) | Touriste-routier | s.t. |

General classification after stage 12b

| Rank | Rider | Team | Time |
|---|---|---|---|
| 1 | Sylvère Maes (BEL) | Belgium | |
| 2 | Roger Lapébie (FRA) | France | + 2' 18" |
| 3 | Mario Vicini (ITA) | Touriste-routier | + 5' 13" |
| 4 | | | |
| 5 | | | |
| 6 | | | |
| 7 | | | |
| 8 | | | |
| 9 | | | |
| 10 | | | |
