= 1937 Tour de France, Stage 13a to Stage 20 =

Cycling race stages

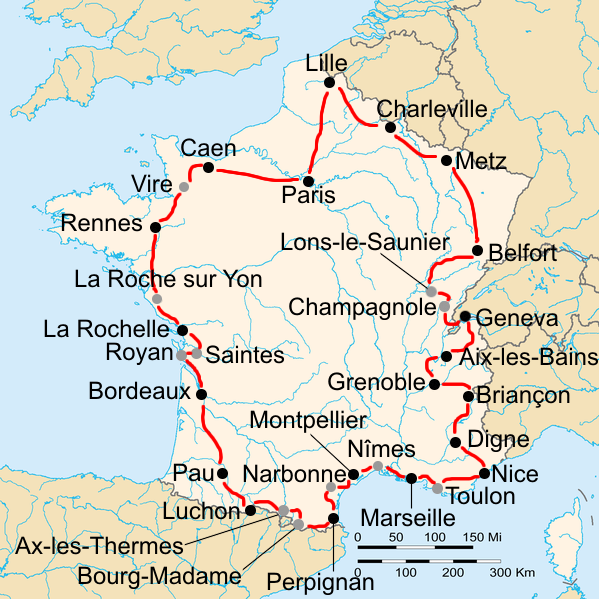
Route of the 1937 Tour de France

The 1937 Tour de France was the 31st edition of the Tour de France, one of cycling's Grand Tours. The Tour began in Paris with a flat stage on 30 June, and Stage 13a occurred on 15 July with a flat stage from Montpellier. The race finished in Paris on 25 July.

== Stage 13a ==
15 July 1937 - Montpellier to Narbonne, 103 km (64 mi)

Stage 13a result

Rank	Rider	Team	Time
1	Francesco Camusso (ITA)	Italy	2h 32' 39"
2	Éloi Meulenberg (BEL)	Belgium	+ 8' 07"
3	Gustave Danneels (BEL)	Belgium	s.t.
4	Jean Fréchaut (FRA)	Touriste-routier	s.t.
5	Sauveur Ducazeaux (FRA)	Touriste-routier	s.t.
=6	Sylvère Maes (BEL)	Belgium	s.t.
=6	Félicien Vervaecke (BEL)	Belgium	s.t.
=6	Robert Wierinckx (BEL)	Belgium	s.t.
=6	Hubert Deltour (BEL)	Belgium	s.t.
=6	Albertin Disseaux (BEL)	Belgium	s.t.

General classification after stage 13a

Rank	Rider	Team	Time
1	Sylvère Maes (BEL)	Belgium	
2	Roger Lapébie (FRA)	France	+ 2' 18"
3	Mario Vicini (ITA)	Touriste-routier	+ 5' 13"
4			
5			
6			
7			
8			
9			
10			

== Stage 13b ==
15 July 1937 - Narbonne to Perpignan, 63 km (39 mi)

Stage 13b result

Rank	Rider	Team	Time
1	Éloi Meulenberg (BEL)	Belgium	1h 31' 08"
2	Paul Chocque (FRA)	France	s.t.
3	Heinz Wengler (GER)	Germany	s.t.
4	Victor Cosson (FRA)	Touriste-routier	s.t.
5	Erich Bautz (GER)	Germany	s.t.
6	Emile Gamard (FRA)	France	s.t.
7	Félicien Vervaecke (BEL)	Belgium	s.t.
8	Mariano Cañardo (ESP)	Spain	+ 51"
9	Gustave Danneels (BEL)	Belgium	+ 53"
10	Roger Lapébie (FRA)	France	s.t.

General classification after stage 13b

Rank	Rider	Team	Time
1	Sylvère Maes (BEL)	Belgium	
2	Roger Lapébie (FRA)	France	+ 2' 18"
3	Mario Vicini (ITA)	Touriste-routier	+ 5' 13"
4			
5			
6			
7			
8			
9			
10			

== Rest day 4 ==
16 July 1937 - Perpignan

== Stage 14a ==
17 July 1937 - Perpignan to Bourg-Madame, 99 km (62 mi)

Stage 14a result

Rank	Rider	Team	Time
1	Éloi Meulenberg (BEL)	Belgium	3h 55' 15"
2	Jean Fréchaut (FRA)	Touriste-routier	s.t.
3	Mario Vicini (ITA)	Touriste-routier	s.t.
=4	Sylvère Maes (BEL)	Belgium	s.t.
=4	Félicien Vervaecke (BEL)	Belgium	s.t.
=4	Herbert Muller (BEL)	Touriste-routier	s.t.
=4	Antoon van Schendel (NED)	Netherlands	s.t.
=4	Edward Vissers (BEL)	Touriste-routier	s.t.
=4	Jules Lowie (BEL)	Belgium	s.t.
=4	Albertin Disseaux (BEL)	Belgium	s.t.

General classification after stage 14a

Rank	Rider	Team	Time
1	Sylvère Maes (BEL)	Belgium	
2	Roger Lapébie (FRA)	France	+ 2' 18"
3	Mario Vicini (ITA)	Touriste-routier	+ 5' 12"
4			
5			
6			
7			
8			
9			
10			

== Stage 14b ==
17 July 1937 - Bourg-Madame to Ax-les-Thermes, 59 km (37 mi)

Stage 14b result

Rank	Rider	Team	Time
1	Mariano Cañardo (ESP)	Spain	2h 00' 05"
2	Sylvain Marcaillou (FRA)	France	s.t.
3	Victor Cosson (FRA)	Touriste-routier	s.t.
4	Robert Tanneveau (FRA)	France	s.t.
=5	Sylvère Maes (BEL)	Belgium	s.t.
=5	Félicien Vervaecke (BEL)	Belgium	s.t.
=5	Hubert Deltour (BEL)	Belgium	s.t.
=5	Albertin Disseaux (BEL)	Belgium	s.t.
=5	Gustave Danneels (BEL)	Belgium	s.t.
=5	Edward Vissers (BEL)	Touriste-routier	s.t.

General classification after stage 14b

Rank	Rider	Team	Time
1	Sylvère Maes (BEL)	Belgium	
2	Roger Lapébie (FRA)	France	+ 2' 18"
3	Mario Vicini (ITA)	Touriste-routier	+ 5' 12"
4			
5			
6			
7			
8			
9			
10			

== Stage 14c ==
17 July 1937 - Ax-les-Thermes to Luchon, 167 km (104 mi)

Stage 14c result

Rank	Rider	Team	Time
1	Éloi Meulenberg (BEL)	Belgium	6h 22' 48"
2	Gustaaf Deloor (BEL)	Touriste-routier	s.t.
3	Jean Fréchaut (FRA)	Touriste-routier	s.t.
4	Erich Bautz (GER)	Germany	s.t.
5	Hubert Deltour (BEL)	Belgium	s.t.
=6	Sylvère Maes (BEL)	Belgium	s.t.
=6	Félicien Vervaecke (BEL)	Belgium	s.t.
=6	Albertin Disseaux (BEL)	Belgium	s.t.
=6	Jules Lowie (BEL)	Belgium	s.t.
=6	Augusto Introzzi (ITA)	Italy	s.t.

General classification after stage 14c

Rank	Rider	Team	Time
1	Sylvère Maes (BEL)	Belgium	
2	Roger Lapébie (FRA)	France	+ 2' 18"
3	Mario Vicini (ITA)	Touriste-routier	+ 5' 13"
4			
5			
6			
7			
8			
9			
10			

== Rest day 5 ==
18 July 1937 - Luchon

== Stage 15 ==
19 July 1937 - Luchon to Pau, 194 km (121 mi)

Stage 15 result

Rank	Rider	Team	Time
1	Julián Berrendero (ESP)	Spain	7h 01' 01"
2	Roger Lapébie (FRA)	France	+ 49"
3	Jean Fréchaut (FRA)	Touriste-routier	s.t.
4	Mario Vicini (ITA)	Touriste-routier	s.t.
5	Victor Cosson (FRA)	Touriste-routier	s.t.
6	Mariano Cañardo (ESP)	Spain	s.t.
7	Sylvère Maes (BEL)	Belgium	s.t.
8	Francesco Camusso (ITA)	Italy	s.t.
9	Leo Amberg (SUI)	Switzerland	+ 1' 47"
10	Paul Egli (SUI)	Switzerland	+ 3' 27"

General classification after stage 15

Rank	Rider	Team	Time
1	Sylvère Maes (BEL)	Belgium	
2	Roger Lapébie (FRA)	France	+ 3' 03"
3	Mario Vicini (ITA)	Touriste-routier	+ 4' 57"
4			
5			
6			
7			
8			
9			
10			

== Rest day 6 ==
20 July 1937 - Pau

== Stage 16 ==
21 July 1937 - Pau to Bordeaux, 235 km (146 mi)

Stage 16 result

Rank	Rider	Team	Time
1	Paul Chocque (FRA)	France	7h 56' 50"
2	Roger Lapébie (FRA)	France	+ 7"
3	Heinz Wengler (GER)	Germany	s.t.
4	Paul Egli (SUI)	Switzerland	s.t.
5	Jean Fréchaut (FRA)	Touriste-routier	s.t.
=6	Giuseppe Martano (ITA)	Italy	s.t.
=6	Carlo Romanatti (ITA)	Italy	s.t.
=6	Francesco Camusso (ITA)	Italy	s.t.
=6	Augusto Introzzi (ITA)	Italy	s.t.
=6	Oskar Thierbach (GER)	Germany	s.t.

General classification after stage 16

Rank	Rider	Team	Time
1	Sylvère Maes (BEL)	Belgium	
2	Roger Lapébie (FRA)	France	+ 25"
3	Mario Vicini (ITA)	Touriste-routier	+ 3' 04"
4			
5			
6			
7			
8			
9			
10			

== Stage 17a ==
22 July 1937 - Bordeaux to Royan, 123 km (76 mi)

Stage 17a result

Rank	Rider	Team	Time
1	Erich Bautz (GER)	Germany	3h 05' 12"
2	Roger Lapébie (FRA)	France	s.t.
3	Adolph Braeckeveldt (BEL)	Touriste-routier	s.t.
4	Henri Puppo (FRA)	Touriste-routier	s.t.
=5	Giuseppe Martano (ITA)	Italy	s.t.
=5	Augusto Introzzi (ITA)	Italy	s.t.
=5	Francesco Camusso (ITA)	Italy	s.t.
=5	Ludwig Geyer (GER)	Germany	s.t.
=5	Oskar Thierbach (GER)	Germany	s.t.
=5	Otto Weckerling (GER)	Germany	s.t.

General classification after stage 17a

Rank	Rider	Team	Time
1	Roger Lapébie (FRA)	France	
2	Mario Vicini (ITA)	Touriste-routier	+ 2' 54"
3	Leo Amberg (SUI)	Switzerland	+ 23' 05"
4			
5			
6			
7			
8			
9			
10			

== Stage 17b ==
22 July 1937 - Royan to Saintes, 37 km (23 mi)

Stage 17b result

Rank	Rider	Team	Time
=1	Adolph Braeckeveldt (BEL)	Touriste-routier	1h 06' 27"
=1	Heinz Wengler (GER)	Germany	s.t.
3	René Pedroli (SUI)	Switzerland	s.t.
4	Henri Puppo (FRA)	Touriste-routier	s.t.
5	Arsène Mersch (LUX)	Luxembourg	s.t.
6	Pierre Cloarec (FRA)	France	s.t.
7	Paul Egli (SUI)	Switzerland	s.t.
=8	Giuseppe Martano (ITA)	Italy	s.t.
=8	Carlo Romanatti (ITA)	Italy	s.t.
=8	Augusto Introzzi (ITA)	Italy	s.t.

General classification after stage 17b

Rank	Rider	Team	Time
1	Roger Lapébie (FRA)	France	
2	Mario Vicini (ITA)	Touriste-routier	+ 2' 54"
3	Leo Amberg (SUI)	Switzerland	+ 23' 05"
4			
5			
6			
7			
8			
9			
10			

== Stage 17c ==
22 July 1937 - Saintes to La Rochelle, 67 km (42 mi)

Stage 17c result

Rank	Rider	Team	Time
1	Roger Lapébie (FRA)	France	2h 25' 50"
2	Giuseppe Martano (ITA)	Italy	s.t.
3	Adolph Braeckeveldt (BEL)	Touriste-routier	s.t.
4	Jean Fréchaut (FRA)	Touriste-routier	s.t.
5	Jean Goujon (FRA)	Touriste-routier	s.t.
6	Heinz Wengler (GER)	Germany	s.t.
=7	Carlo Romanatti (ITA)	Italy	s.t.
=7	Augusto Introzzi (ITA)	Italy	s.t.
=7	Francesco Camusso (ITA)	Italy	s.t.
=7	Oskar Thierbach (GER)	Germany	s.t.

General classification after stage 17c

Rank	Rider	Team	Time
1	Roger Lapébie (FRA)	France	
2	Mario Vicini (ITA)	Touriste-routier	+ 4' 54"
3	Leo Amberg (SUI)	Switzerland	+ 25' 05"
4			
5			
6			
7			
8			
9			
10			

== Stage 18a ==
23 July 1937 - La Rochelle to La Roche sur Yon, 82 km (51 mi) (TTT)

Stage 18a result

Rank	Rider	Team	Time
1	Roger Lapébie (FRA)	France	1h 59' 10"
2	Sylvain Marcaillou (FRA)	France	s.t.
3	Paul Chocque (FRA)	France	s.t.
4	Robert Tanneveau (FRA)	France	s.t.
5	Giuseppe Martano (ITA)	Italy	+ 11"
6	Augusto Introzzi (ITA)	Italy	s.t.
7	Mario Vicini (ITA)	Touriste-routier	s.t.
8	Antoon van Schendel (NED)	Netherlands	s.t.
9	Francesco Camusso (ITA)	Italy	s.t.
10	Carlo Romanatti (ITA)	Italy	s.t.

General classification after stage 18a

Rank	Rider	Team	Time
1	Roger Lapébie (FRA)	France	
2	Mario Vicini (ITA)	Touriste-routier	+ 5' 05"
3	Francesco Camusso (ITA)	Italy	+ 25' 17"
4			
5			
6			
7			
8			
9			
10			

== Stage 18b ==
23 July 1937 - La Roche sur Yon to Rennes, 172 km (107 mi)

Stage 18b result

Rank	Rider	Team	Time
1	Paul Chocque (FRA)	France	6h 06' 14"
2	Jean Fréchaut (FRA)	Touriste-routier	+ 6"
3	Henri Puppo (FRA)	Touriste-routier	s.t.
4	Pierre Cloarec (FRA)	France	s.t.
5	Adolph Braeckeveldt (BEL)	Touriste-routier	s.t.
=6	Giuseppe Martano (ITA)	Italy	s.t.
=6	Carlo Romanatti (ITA)	Italy	s.t.
=6	Augusto Introzzi (ITA)	Italy	s.t.
=6	Francesco Camusso (ITA)	Italy	s.t.
=6	Oskar Thierbach (GER)	Germany	s.t.

General classification after stage 18b

Rank	Rider	Team	Time
1	Roger Lapébie (FRA)	France	
2	Mario Vicini (ITA)	Touriste-routier	+ 5' 05"
3	Francesco Camusso (ITA)	Italy	+ 25' 17"
4			
5			
6			
7			
8			
9			
10			

== Stage 19a ==
24 July 1937 - Rennes to Vire, 114 km (71 mi)

Stage 19a result

Rank	Rider	Team	Time
1	Raymond Passat (FRA)	Touriste-routier	3h 21' 56"
2	Giuseppe Martano (ITA)	Italy	+ 11' 55"
3	Adolph Braeckeveldt (BEL)	Touriste-routier	s.t.
4	Paul Egli (SUI)	Switzerland	s.t.
5	Heinz Wengler (GER)	Germany	s.t.
6	Victor Cosson (FRA)	Touriste-routier	s.t.
7	Sauveur Ducazeaux (FRA)	Touriste-routier	s.t.
8	Paul Chocque (FRA)	France	s.t.
9	Roger Lapébie (FRA)	France	s.t.
10	Mario Vicini (ITA)	Touriste-routier	s.t.

General classification after stage 19a

Rank	Rider	Team	Time
1	Roger Lapébie (FRA)	France	
2	Mario Vicini (ITA)	Touriste-routier	+ 7' 05"
3	Francesco Camusso (ITA)	Italy	+ 25' 17"
4			
5			
6			
7			
8			
9			
10			

== Stage 19b ==
24 July 1937 - Vire to Caen, 59 km (37 mi) (ITT)

Stage 19b result

Rank	Rider	Team	Time
1	Leo Amberg (SUI)	Switzerland	1h 28' 36"
2	Erich Bautz (GER)	Germany	+ 2' 29"
3	Giuseppe Martano (ITA)	Italy	s.t.
4	Roger Lapébie (FRA)	France	+ 3' 10"
5	Edward Vissers (BEL)	Touriste-routier	s.t.
6	Mario Vicini (ITA)	Touriste-routier	+ 3' 22"
7	Robert Zimmermann (SUI)	Switzerland	+ 3' 30"
8	Herbert Muller (BEL)	Touriste-routier	+ 3' 34"
9	Sylvain Marcaillou (FRA)	France	+ 3' 39"
10	Gustaaf Deloor (BEL)	Touriste-routier	+ 3' 46"

General classification after stage 19b

Rank	Rider	Team	Time
1	Roger Lapébie (FRA)	France	
2	Mario Vicini (ITA)	Touriste-routier	+ 7' 17"
3	Leo Amberg (SUI)	Switzerland	+ 26' 13"
4			
5			
6			
7			
8			
9			
10			

== Stage 20 ==
25 July 1937 - Caen to Paris, 234 km (145 mi)

Stage 20 result

Rank	Rider	Team	Time
1	Edward Vissers (BEL)	Touriste-routier	7h 23' 42"
2	Henri Puppo (BEL)	Touriste-routier	+ 43"
3	Sauveur Ducazeaux (FRA)	Touriste-routier	s.t.
4	Giuseppe Martano (ITA)	Italy	s.t.
5	Gustaaf Deloor (BEL)	Touriste-routier	s.t.
=6	Erich Bautz (GER)	Germany	s.t.
=6	Fabien Galateau (FRA)	Touriste-routier	s.t.
=6	Herbert Muller (BEL)	Touriste-routier	s.t.
=6	Antoon van Schendel (NED)	Netherlands	s.t.
=6	Bruno Carini (FRA)	Touriste-routier	s.t.

General classification after stage 20

Rank	Rider	Team	Time
1	Roger Lapébie (FRA)	France	138h 58' 31"
2	Mario Vicini (ITA)	Touriste-routier	+ 7' 17"
3	Leo Amberg (SUI)	Switzerland	+ 26' 13"
4	Francesco Camusso (ITA)	Italy	+ 26' 53"
5	Sylvain Marcaillou (FRA)	France	+ 35' 36"
6	Edward Vissers (BEL)	Touriste-routier	+ 38' 13"
7	Paul Chocque (FRA)	France	+ 1h 05' 19"
8	Pierre Gallien (FRA)	Touriste-routier	+ 1h 06' 33"
9	Erich Bautz (GER)	Germany	+ 1h 06' 41"
10	Jean Fréchaut (FRA)	Touriste-routier	+ 1h 24' 34"
