= 1938 UCI Road World Championships – Men's road race =

Men's Individual Road Race
1938 UCI Road World Championships
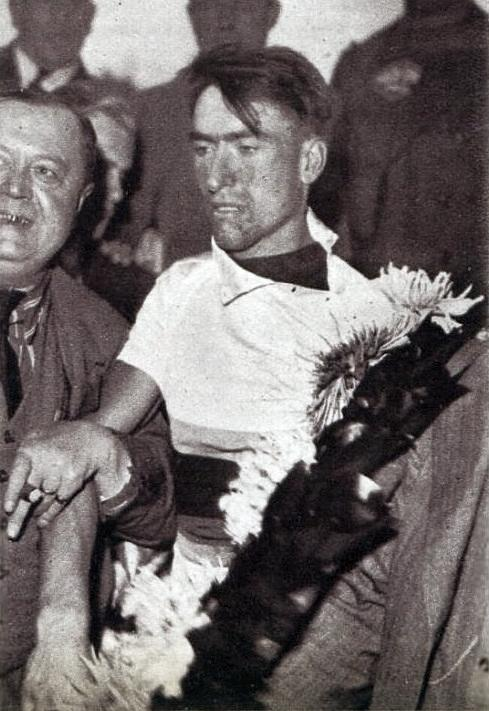
- Marcel Kint is honoured as world champion

Race details
- Dates: 4 September 1938
- Stages: 1
- Distance: 273 km (169.6 mi)
- Winning time: 7h 53' 25"

Results
	Winner	Marcel Kint (BEL)	(Belgium)
	Second	Paul Egli (SUI)	(Switzerland)
	Third	Leo Amberg (SUI)	(Switzerland)

The men's road race at the 1938 UCI Road World Championships was the 12th edition of the event. The race took place on Sunday 4 September 1938 in Valkenburg, the Netherlands. The race was won by Marcel Kint of Belgium.

== Final classification ==
General classification

Rank	Rider	Time
1st place, gold medalist(s)	Marcel Kint (BEL)	7h 53' 25"
2nd place, silver medalist(s)	Paul Egli (SUI)	+ 0"
3rd place, bronze medalist(s)	Leo Amberg (SUI)	+ 0"
4	Piet Van Nek (NED)	+ 11"
5	Edward Vissers (BEL)	+ 1' 18"
6	François Neuville (BEL)	+ 2' 45"
7	Hans Martin (SUI)	+ 12' 53"
8	Arsène Mersch (LUX)	+ 12' 53"
