= 1937 Paris–Nice =

Race details
- Dates: 9–14 March 1937
- Stages: 6
- Distance: 1,264 km (785.4 mi)
- Winning time: 36h 00' 08"

Results
	Winner	Roger Lapébie (FRA)
	Second	Sylvain Marcaillou (FRA)
	Third	Albert van Schendel (NED)

The 1937 Paris–Nice was the fifth edition of the Paris–Nice cycle race and was held from 9 March to 14 March 1937. The race started in Paris and finished in Nice. The race was won by Roger Lapébie.

== General classification ==
Final general classification

Rank	Rider	Time
1	Roger Lapébie (FRA)	36h 00' 08"
2	Sylvain Marcaillou (FRA)	+ 6' 39"
3	Albert van Schendel (NED)	+ 6' 54"
4	Gustave Danneels (BEL)	+ 10' 22"
5	Hubert Deltour (BEL)	+ 11' 03"
6	René Debenne (FRA)	+ 12' 04"
7	Robert Tanneveau (FRA)	+ 15' 20"
8	Sylvère Maes (BEL)	+ 16' 39"
9	Bruno Carini (FRA)	+ 17' 57"
10	Marcel Kint (BEL)	+ 18' 59"
