= 1939 Tour de Suisse =

Race details
- Dates: 5–12 August 1939
- Stages: 8
- Distance: 1,724 km (1,071 mi)
- Winning time: 48h 45' 06"

Results
	Winner	Robert Zimmermann (SUI)
	Second	Max Bolliger (SUI)
	Third	Christophe Didier (LUX)

The 1939 Tour de Suisse was the seventh edition of the Tour de Suisse cycle race and was held from 5 August to 12 August 1939. The race started and finished in Zürich. The race was won by Robert Zimmermann.

== General classification ==
Final general classification

Rank	Rider	Time
1	Robert Zimmermann (SUI)	48h 45' 06"
2	Max Bolliger (SUI)	+ 29"
3	Christophe Didier (LUX)	+ 36"
4	Paul Egli (SUI)	+ 1' 23"
5	Walter Diggelmann (SUI)	+ 16' 17"
6	Michele Benente (ITA)	+ 17' 31"
7	Karl Litschi (SUI)	+ 20' 19"
8	Settimio Simonini (ITA)	+ 20' 22"
9	Robert Lang (SUI)	+ 21' 50"
10	Leo Amberg (SUI)	+ 22' 55"
