= 1937 Tour de Suisse =

Race details
- Dates: 31 July–7 August 1937
- Stages: 8
- Distance: 1,468 km (912.2 mi)
- Winning time: 43h 29' 01"

Results
| | Winner | Karl Litschi (SUI) |
| | Second | Leo Amberg (SUI) |
| | Third | Walter Blattmann (SUI) |

The 1937 Tour de Suisse was the fifth edition of the Tour de Suisse cycle race and was held from 31 July to 7 August 1937. The race started and finished in Zürich. The race was won by Karl Litschi.

== General classification ==
Final general classification

| Rank | Rider | Time |
|---|---|---|
| 1 | Karl Litschi (SUI) | 43h 29' 01" |
| 2 | Leo Amberg (SUI) | + 11' 19" |
| 3 | Walter Blattmann (SUI) | + 20' 22" |
| 4 | Enrico Mollo (ITA) | + 27' 22" |
| 5 | Robert Zimmermann (SUI) | + 28' 45" |
| 6 | Werner Buchwalder (SUI) | + 29' 10" |
| 7 | Cesare Del Cancia (ITA) | + 30' 36" |
| 8 | Paul Egli (SUI) | + 38' 02" |
| 9 | Georges Christiaens (BEL) | + 38' 41" |
| 10 | Kurt Stettler (SUI) | + 49' 48" |
