= Grand Prix de Wallonie =

Belgian one-day road cycling race

Race details
- Date: Mid-September
- Region: Wallonia, Belgium
- English name: Grand Prix of Wallonia
- Local name: Grand Prix de Wallonie (in French)
- Discipline: Road
- Competition: UCI ProSeries
- Type: Single-day
- Web site: www.trworg.be

History
- First edition: 1935
- Editions: 66 (as of 2026)
- First winner: Gustaaf Degreef (BEL)
- Most wins: Adolf Braeckeveldt (BEL); Nick Nuyens (BEL) (3 wins)
- Most recent: Aubin Sparfel (FRA)

The Grand Prix de Wallonie is an annual road bicycle race held annually in Wallonia, Belgium. From 2005 to 2019 it was organised as a category 1.1 event on the UCI Europe Tour. In 2021, it joined the UCI ProSeries, after being cancelled in 2020. It has a profile similar to the Ardennes classics in Wallonia. A women's edition of the race was created in 2022, holding 1.1 status.

== Winners ==
=== Men ===
Year	Country	Rider	Team
1935	Belgium	Gustaaf De Greef	Génial Lucifer–Hutchinson
1936	Belgium	Adolf Braeckeveldt	La Française–Dunlop–Diamant
1937	Belgium	Karel Tersago	Labor–Dunlop
1938	Belgium	Adolf Braeckeveldt	Helyett–Hutchinson
1939	Belgium	Adolf Braeckeveldt	Helyett–Hutchinson
1940– 1941	No race		
1942	Belgium	Maurits Van Herzele	Helyett–Hutchinson
1943	Belgium	Edward Van Dijck	Helyett–Hutchinson
1944	Belgium	Joseph Somers	A. Trialoux–Wolber
1945– 1948	No race		
1949	Belgium	Jacques Geus	Rochet–Dunlop
1950	Belgium	Joseph Verhaert	Mercier–Hutchinson
1951– 1969	No race		
1970	Belgium	Ferdinand Bracke	Peugeot–BP–Michelin
1971	Italy	Felice Gimondi	Salvarani
1972	Belgium	Émile Cambre	Goldor–IJsboerke
1973	Belgium	Albert Van Vlierberghe	Rokado–De Gribaldy
1974	Belgium	Frans Verbeeck	Watney–Maes Pils
1975	Belgium	André Dierickx	Rokado
1976	Belgium	Herman Van Springel	Flandria–Velda
1977	Belgium	Walter Planckaert	Maes Pils–Mini Flat
1978	Belgium	Willem Peeters	IJsboerke–Gios
1979	Netherlands	Leo van Vliet	TI–Raleigh
1980	Belgium	Willy De Geest	IJsboerke–Warncke Eis
1981	Italy	Walter Dalgal	Splendor–Europ Decor
1982	Netherlands	Hennie Kuiper	Daf Trucks–TeVe Blad
1983	Ireland	Stephen Roche	Peugeot–Shell–Michelin
1984	Belgium	Frank Hoste	Europ Decor–Boule d'Or
1985	France	Marc Madiot	Renault–Elf–Gitane
1986	Netherlands	Steven Rooks	PDM–Ultima–Concorde
1987	France	Pascal Poisson	Système U
1988	Belgium	Claude Criquielion	Hitachi–Bosal
1989	Switzerland	Thomas Wegmüller	Domex–Weinmann
1990	France	Luc Leblanc	Castorama
1991	Belgium	Frank Van Den Abeele	Lotto
1992	Netherlands	Danny Nelissen	PDM–Ultima–Concorde
1993	Belgium	Patrick Evenepoel	Collstrop–Assur Carpets
1994	Belgium	Peter Farazijn	Lotto
1995	Italy	Andrea Chiurato	Mapei–GB–Latexco
1996	Italy	Franco Ballerini	Mapei–GB
1997	Russia	Dmitri Konyshev	Roslotto–ZG Mobili
1998	Germany	Udo Bölts	Team Telekom
1999	Netherlands	Patrick Jonker	Rabobank
2000	Italy	Alberto Elli	Team Telekom
2001	Belgium	Axel Merckx	Domo–Farm Frites
2002	Belgium	Dave Bruylandts	Domo–Farm Frites
2003	Belgium	Dave Bruylandts	Marlux-Wincor Nixdorf
2004	Belgium	Nick Nuyens	Quick-Step–Davitamon
2005	Belgium	Nick Nuyens	Quick-Step–Innergetic
2006	Belgium	Philippe Gilbert	Française des Jeux
2007	Belgium	Bert De Waele	Landbouwkrediet–Tönissteiner
2008	Italy	Stefano Garzelli	Acqua & Sapone–Caffè Mokambo
2009	Belgium	Nick Nuyens	Rabobank
2010	Germany	Paul Martens	Rabobank
2011	Belgium	Philippe Gilbert	Omega Pharma–Lotto
2012	France	Julien Simon	Saur–Sojasun
2013	Belgium	Jan Bakelants	Belgium national team
2014	Belgium	Greg Van Avermaet	BMC Racing Team
2015	Belgium	Jens Debusschere	Lotto–Soudal
2016	France	Tony Gallopin	Lotto–Soudal
2017	Belgium	Tim Wellens	Lotto–Soudal
2018	Belgium	Jasper Stuyven	Trek–Segafredo
2019	Latvia	Krists Neilands	Israel Cycling Academy
2020	No race due to the COVID-19 pandemic		
2021	France	Christophe Laporte	Cofidis
2022	Netherlands	Mathieu van der Poel	Alpecin–Deceuninck
2023	Spain	Gonzalo Serrano	Movistar Team
2024	Spain	Roger Adrià	Bora–Hansgrohe
2025	Belgium	Arnaud De Lie	Lotto
2026	France	Aubin Sparfel	Decathlon CMA CGM

=== Women ===
Year	Country	Rider	Team
2022	Belgium	Julie De Wilde	Plantur–Pura
2023	Poland	Marta Lach	Ceratizit–WNT Pro Cycling
2024	Netherlands	Karlijn Swinkels	UAE Team ADQ
2025	Belgium	Shari Bossuyt	AG Insurance–Soudal
2026	Netherlands	Karlijn Swinkels	UAE Team L'Imad
