= Hauswald =

Hauswald is a German surname. Notable people with the surname include:

- Harald Hauswald (born 1954), German photographer
- Herbert Hauswald (1912–?), German cyclist
- Martin Hauswald (born 1982), German footballer
- Simone Hauswald (born 1979), German biathlete
