= Puppo =

Puppo is a surname. Notable people with the surname include:

- Federico Puppo (born 1986), Uruguayan footballer
- Giuseppe Puppo (born 1957), Italian journalist and writer
- Henri Puppo (1913–2012), Italian cyclist
- Romano Puppo (1933–1994), Italian actor
- Sandro Puppo (1918–1986), Italian footballer
