= Pierre Allès =

Algerian cyclist (1916–2012)

Personal information
- Born: 30 May 1916 El Biar, Algiers, French Algeria
- Died: 28 May 2012 (aged 95) Aubagne, France

Cycling career
- Sport: Cycling
- Discipline: Road
- Role: Rider

Pierre Allès (30 May 1916 – 28 May 2012) was an Algerian racing cyclist. He rode in the 1937 Tour de France.
