= André Bramard =

French cyclist

Personal information
- Born: 15 May 1915
- Died: 7 September 2009 (aged 94)

Cycling career
- Sport: Cycling
- Discipline: Road
- Role: Rider

André Bramard (15 May 1915 – 7 September 2009) was a French racing cyclist. He rode in the 1937 Tour de France.
