= André Auville =

French cyclist

Personal information
- Born: 21 April 1912
- Died: 27 June 1993 (aged 81)

Cycling career
- Sport: Cycling
- Discipline: Road
- Role: Rider

André Auville (21 April 1912 – 27 June 1993) was a French racing cyclist. He rode in the 1937 Tour de France.
