= Maurice Cacheux =

French cyclist

Personal information
- Born: 6 September 1913
- Died: 13 October 1980 (aged 67)

Cycling career
- Sport: Cycling
- Discipline: Road
- Role: Rider

Maurice Cacheux (6 September 1913 – 13 October 1980) was a French racing cyclist. He rode in the 1937 Tour de France.
