= Gerrit Van De Ruit =

Dutch cyclist

Personal information
- Born: 12 September 1911
- Died: 30 July 1981 (aged 69)

Cycling career
- Sport: Cycling
- Discipline: Road
- Role: Rider

Gerrit Van De Ruit (12 September 1911 – 30 July 1981) was a Dutch racing cyclist. He rode in the 1937 Tour de France.

== Career ==
- Winner of the professional race at Acht van Chaam in 1937.
- Fifth place in the men's road race at the 1934 UCI Road World Championships.
- Second place in Stage 8 of the 1935 Vuelta a España.
- Runner-up in the Dutch National Road Race Championships in 1934.
