= Pierre Gachon =

Canadian cyclist

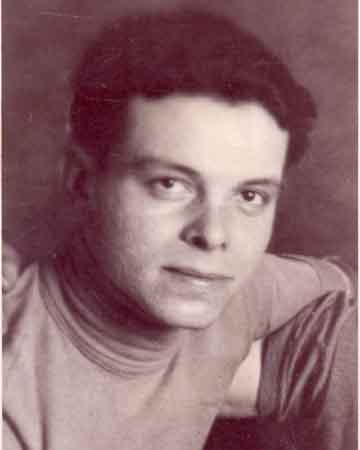

Personal information
- Born: 9 March 1909 Paris, France

Cycling career
- Sport: Cycling
- Discipline: Road
- Role: Rider

Pierre Gachon (born 9 March 1909, date of death unknown) was a Canadian racing cyclist. He rode in the 1937 Tour de France.
