= Passat (disambiguation) =

The Volkswagen Passat is a series of large family cars built since 1973 named after the German word for "trade winds".

Passat may also refer to:

== People ==
- Raymond Passat (1913-1988), a former French professional road bicycle racer

== Other uses ==
- Passat (ship), a German sailing ship
- Passat, the German word for trade wind (a type of wind)
- Passat Nunatak, a glacial island
