= 1938 UCI Road World Championships =

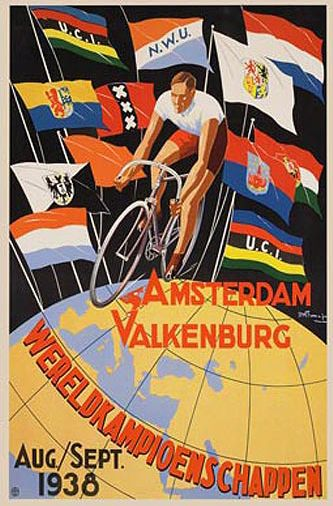

- Venue: Valkenburg, Netherlands
- Dates: 3 and 5 September 1938
- Coordinates: 50°50′59″N 5°49′59″E
- Events: 2

The 1938 UCI Road World Championships was the eighteenth edition of the UCI Road World Championships. It took place in Valkenburg, Netherlands on 2 and 5 September 1938.

Belgian Marcel Kint became the winner in the professional road race. It was the last edition before World War II and Kint thus remained world champion for eight years.

In the same period, the 1938 UCI Track Cycling World Championships were organized in the Olympic Stadium of Amsterdam, Netherlands.

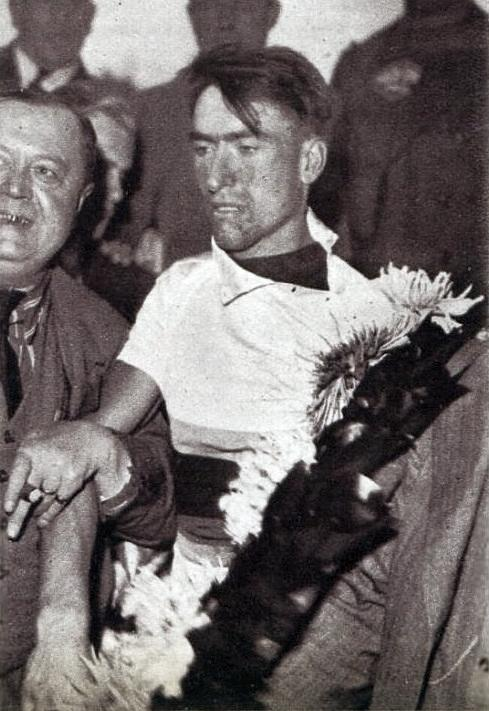
World Champion Marcel Kint with the rainbow yersey

Newsreel of the 1938 Professional Road World Championship (in Dutch)

== Events Summary ==
Event	Gold		Silver		Bronze	
Men's Events
Professional Road Race	Marcel Kint; Belgium	7h 53' 25"	Paul Egli; Switzerland	s.t.	Leo Amberg; Switzerland	s.t.
Amateur Road Race	Hans Knecht; Switzerland	-	Josef Wagner; Switzerland	-	Joop Demmenie; Netherlands	-
