= Robert Godard =

French cyclist

Personal information
- Born: 8 February 1913
- Died: 5 October 1996 (aged 83)
- Height: 1.68 m (5 ft 6 in)
- Weight: 64 kg (141 lb)

Cycling career
- Sport: Cycling
- Discipline: Road
- Role: Rider

Robert Godard (7 February 1913 – 5 October 1996) was a French racing cyclist. He rode in the 1937 Tour de France.
