= Reinhold Wendel =

German racing cyclist (1910–1945)

Personal information
- Born: 3 September 1910
- Died: 1945 (aged 34–35)

Cycling career
- Sport: Cycling
- Discipline: Road
- Role: Rider

Reinhold Wendel (3 September 1910 – 1945) was a German racing cyclist. He rode in the 1937 Tour de France.
