= Aloyse Klensch =

Luxembourgish cyclist

Personal information
- Full name: Aloyse Klensch
- Born: 24 April 1914 Essingen, Luxembourg
- Died: 12 July 1961 (aged 47) Luxembourg City, Luxembourg

Cycling career
- Sport: Cycling
- Role: Rider

Aloyse Klensch (24 April 1914 – 12 July 1961) was a Luxembourgish racing cyclist. He finished in last place in the 1937 Tour de France.
