= Piet van Nek =

Dutch cyclist

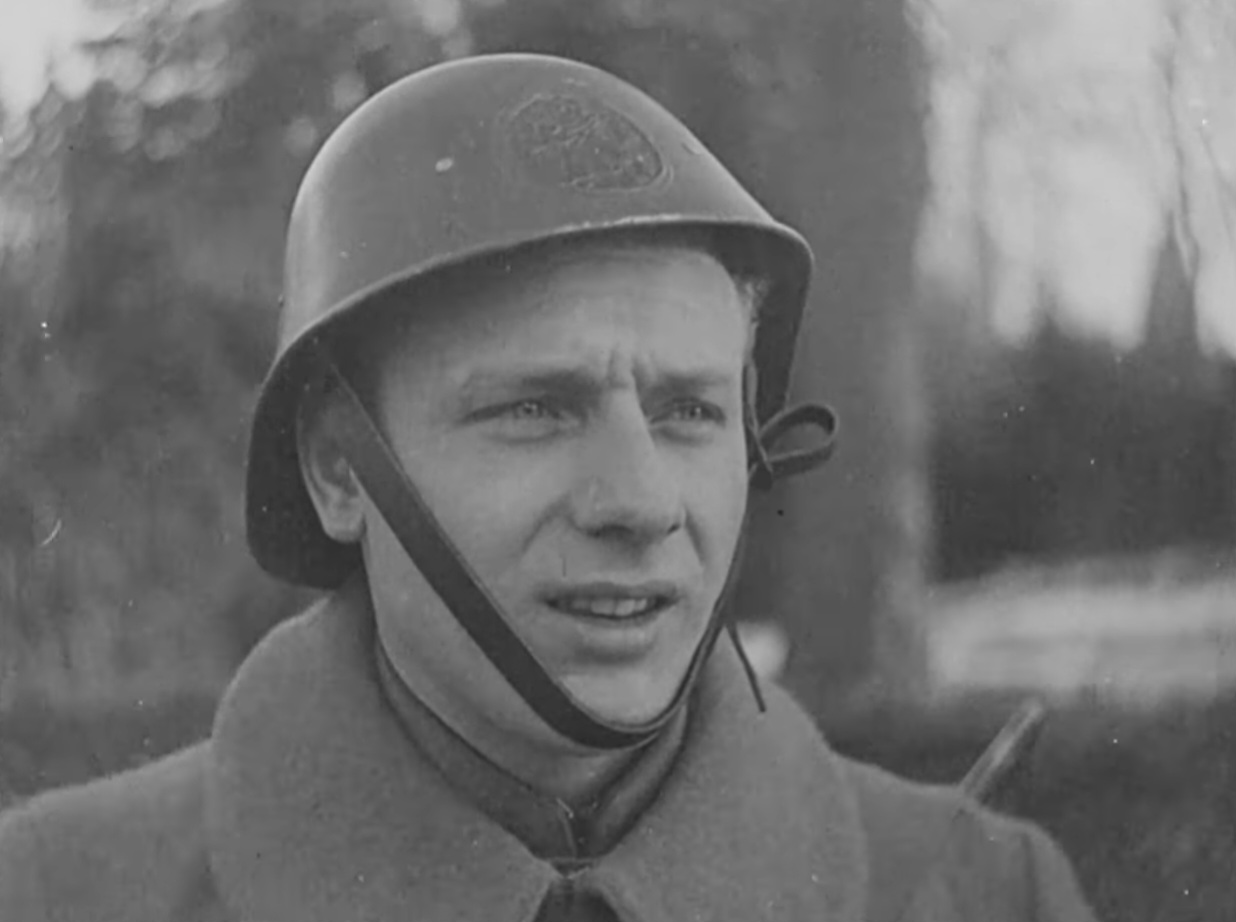

Personal information
- Born: 18 August 1916 Nieuwendam, Netherlands
- Died: 14 March 1961 (aged 44) Amsterdam, Netherlands

Cycling career
- Sport: Cycling
- Discipline: Road
- Role: Rider

Piet van Nek (18 August 1916 – 14 March 1961) was a Dutch racing cyclist. He rode in the 1937 Tour de France.
