= Corny-sur-Moselle =

- Commune
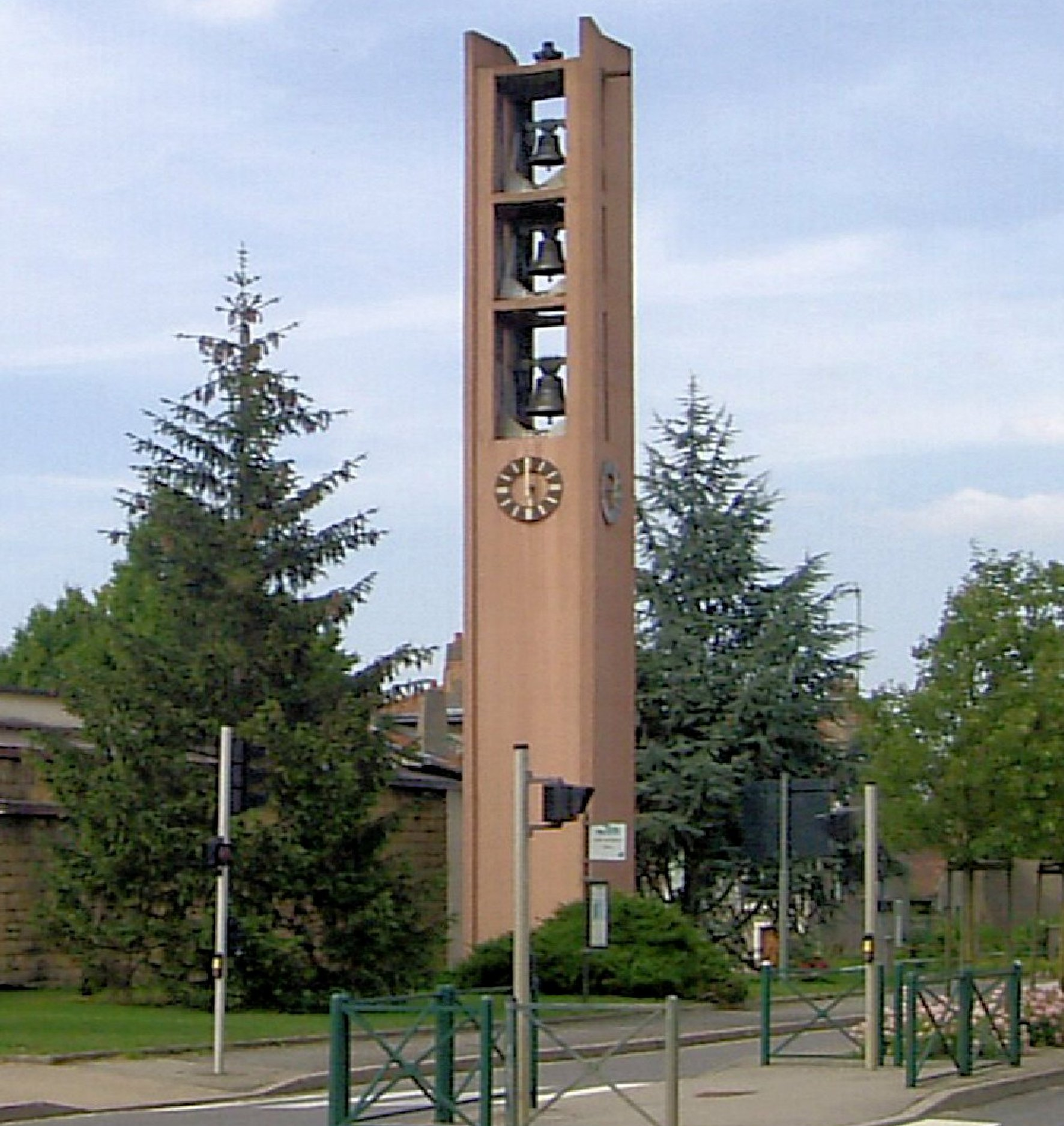
- The church in Corny-sur-Moselle

- Coat of arms
- Location of Corny-sur-Moselle
- Location within France Location within Grand Est
- Coordinates: 49°02′08″N 6°03′36″E
- Country: France
- Region: Grand Est
- Department: Moselle
- Arrondissement: Metz
- Canton: Les Coteaux de Moselle
- Intercommunality: Mad et Moselle

Government
  - Mayor (2020–2026): Denis Blouet
- Area^{1}: 8.2 km^{2} (3.2 sq mi)
- Elevation: 180 m (590 ft)
- Highest elevation: 360 m (1,180 ft)
- Lowest elevation: 169 m (554 ft)
- Population (2023): 2,168
  - Density: 260/km^{2} (680/sq mi)
- Time zone: UTC+01:00 (CET)
  - Summer (DST): UTC+02:00 (CEST)
- INSEE/Postal code: 57153 /57680
- ^{1} French Land Register data, which excludes lakes, ponds, glaciers > 1 km^{2} (0.386 sq mi or 247 acres) and river estuaries.

Corny-sur-Moselle (French pronunciation: [kɔʁni syʁ mɔzɛl], literally Corny on Moselle; German: Corningen, (1940-1944) Korningen) is a commune in the Moselle department in Grand Est in north-eastern France.

== Population ==
Historical population
Year	Pop.	±% p.a.
1968	1,038	—
1975	1,132	+1.25%
1982	1,248	+1.40%
1990	1,490	+2.24%
1999	1,759	+1.86%
2007	2,152	+2.55%
2012	2,256	+0.95%
2017	2,219	−0.33%
2023	2,168	−0.39%
Source: INSEE

== See also ==
- Communes of the Moselle department
