= Alphonse Antoine =

French cyclist (1915–1999)

Personal information
- Full name: Alphonse Antoine
- Born: 19 August 1915 Corny-sur-Moselle, Alsace-Lorraine, German Empire
- Died: 21 November 1999 (aged 84) Metz, France

Cycling career
- Sport: Cycling
- Discipline: Road
- Role: Rider

Major wins
- One stage 1937 Tour de France

Alphonse Antoine (19 August 1915 in Corny-sur-Moselle – 21 November 1999 in Metz) was a French professional road bicycle racer.

== Major results ==
1935
Belgium national track sprint amateur championship
1936
Mulhouse
1937
Tour de France:

Winner stage 12A

1938
GP de Lorraine
1939
GP de Metz
Tour de Doubs
