= Walter Generati =

Italian cyclist

Personal information
- Full name: Walter Generati
- Born: 8 September 1913 Bomporto, Italy
- Died: 8 February 2001 (aged 87) Modena, Italy

Cycling career
- Sport: Cycling
- Discipline: Road
- Role: Rider

Major wins
- One stage 1937 Tour de France; Three stages Giro d'Italia

Walter Generati (Solara, Bomporto, 8 September 1913 – Modena, 8 February 2001) was an Italian professional road bicycle racer, who won the third stage in the 1937 Tour de France.

== Major results ==
1937
Torino – Ceriale
Tour de France:

Winner stage 3

Giro d'Italia:

Winner stage 11
6th place overall classification

1938
Giro d'Italia:

Winner stage 4B
6th place overall classification

1940
Giro d'Italia:

Winner stage 7
7th place overall classification
