= Herbert Hauswald =

German cyclist

Personal information
- Born: 4 March 1912

Cycling career
- Sport: Cycling
- Discipline: Road
- Role: Rider

Herbert Hauswald (born 4 March 1912, date of death unknown) was a German racing cyclist. He rode in the 1937 Tour de France.
