= Raymond Lemarié =

French cyclist

Personal information
- Born: 19 June 1913
- Died: 18 December 1997 (aged 84)

Cycling career
- Sport: Cycling
- Discipline: Road
- Role: Rider

Raymond Lemarié (19 June 1913 – 18 December 1997) was a French racing cyclist. He rode in the 1937 Tour de France.
