= Marcel Laurent =

French cyclist

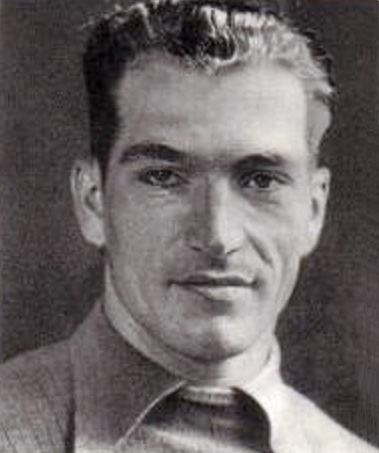

Personal information
- Born: 6 June 1913
- Died: 9 August 1994 (aged 81)

Cycling career
- Sport: Cycling
- Discipline: Road
- Role: Rider

Marcel Laurent (6 June 1913 – 9 August 1994) was a French racing cyclist. He rode in the 1937 Tour de France.
