= Carlo Romanatti =

Italian cyclist

Personal information
- Born: 27 October 1910
- Died: 12 February 1975 (aged 64)

Cycling career
- Sport: Cycling
- Discipline: Road
- Role: Rider

Carlo Romanatti (27 October 1910 – 12 February 1975) was an Italian racing cyclist. He rode in the 1937 Tour de France.
