= Roger Lapébie =

French cyclist

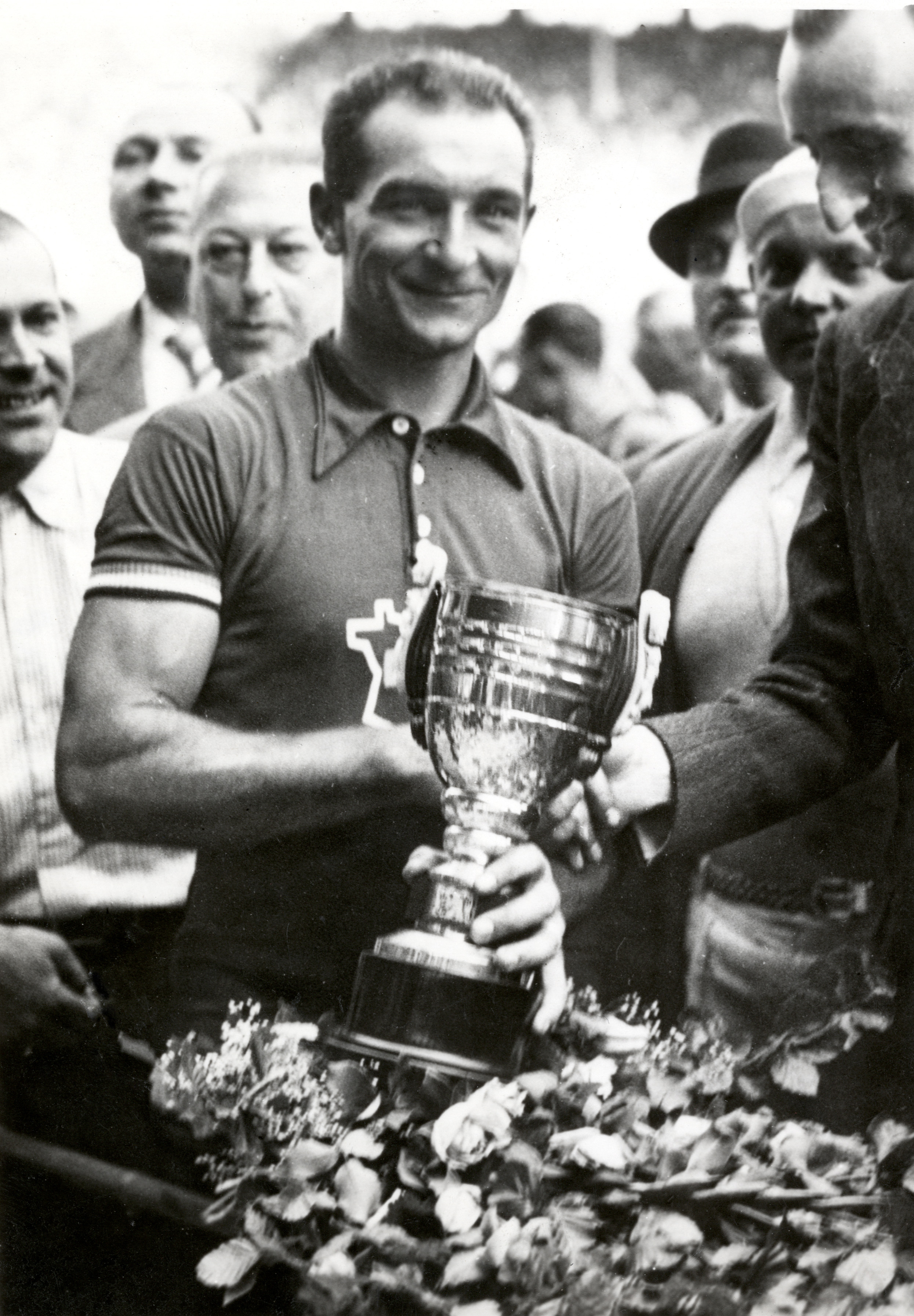

Personal information
- Full name: Roger Lapébie
- Nicknames: Le Pétardier (The Firecracker); Le Placide (The Placid)
- Born: 16 January 1911 Bayonne, France
- Died: 11 October 1996 (aged 85) Pessac, France

Cycling career
- Sport: Cycling
- Discipline: Road
- Role: Rider

Professional teams
- 1932-1936: La Française
- 1937-1939: Mercier
- 1947: Mercier

Major wins
- Grand Tours Tour de France General classification (1937) 9 individual stages (1932, 1934, 1937) Stage races Paris–Nice (1937) Critérium International (1934, 1937) Circuit du Morbihan (1933) One-day races and Classics National Road Race Championships (1933) Paris–Angers (1933) Paris–Vichy (1934) Paris–Saint-Etienne (1935) Paris–Sedan (1938)

Roger Lapébie (pronounced [ʁɔ.ʒe la.pe.bi]; 16 January 1911 – 11 October 1996) was a French racing cyclist who won the 1937 Tour de France. In addition, Lapébie won the 1934 and 1937 editions of the Critérium National. He was born at Bayonne, Aquitaine, and died in Pessac.

== Early career ==
Lapébie made his debut in the Tour de France in 1932, as a member of the French national team. He won one stage in that Tour, and was selected again in 1933; that year he did not win any stage.

In 1934, Lapébie again rode the Tour de France as part of the national team. He won five stages, and finished in third place in the general classification. He would have been a contender for the victory in the 1935 Tour, had it not been for his difficult relation with Henri Desgrange, the Tour director. In the 1935 Tour de France, Lapébie was not selected to be part of the French national team, but had to start as a French individual cyclist. In the Tour of 1936, he did not even start.

== 1937 Tour de France ==
In 1937, Desgrange had retired, and Lapébie was back. In the month before the Tour started, Lapébie had undergone surgery for a lumbar hernia, and there were doubts about his form.

Lapébie won the 1937 Tour by riding 4,415 kilometers in 138 hours, 58 minutes and 31 seconds. His victory was controversial as he was the first rider to complete the race using a modern derailleur. This gave him the advantage of shifting gears without having to stop, dismount and flip the wheel as was customary of racing bicycles used at the time. Lapébie was also known to accept outside assistance in violation of the rules and was at one point penalized 90 seconds by race commissaires.

The advantages taken by Lapébie angered his Belgian rival, Sylvère Maes who had won the Tour the previous year. Maes had led the race through the Alps and Pyrenees but decided to quit in protest of Lapébie's tactics and derailleur use after the 16th stage to Bordeaux. Lapébie, in second place, took the yellow jersey in the absence of Maes and kept it until Paris. The victory delighted the French but angered the cycling-proud Belgians.

Following Lapébie's victory derailleurs became standard racing equipment in the Tour peloton.

After his victory, Lapébie wrote about his experiences during the Tour in left-wing socialist magazines. This did not sit well with Desgrange, who used his influence to prevent Lapébie from starting in the 1938 Tour, so he did not defend his title.

== Career achievements ==
=== Major results ===
1932
Tour de France

Winner stage 12

1933
Circuit du Morbihan: winner stage 2 and winner overall classification
France National road race Championship
Paris-Saint-Etienne: winner stage 2
GP de l'Echo d'Alger
1934
Tour de France

Winner stages 3, 4, 12, 14 and 15
3rd place overall classification

Critérium International
Paris–Nice:Winner stage 2 and 5B
Paris-Saint-Etienne
Paris-Vichy
1935
Paris - Saint-Etienne
Paris Routiers, Six Days
Paris, Six Days
1937
Critérium International
Paris–Nice
Tour de France

Winner overall classification
Winner stages 9, 17C, 18A

1938
Paris - Sedan
1939
1st stage Paris - Nice

=== Grand Tour results timeline ===
	1932	1933	1934	1935	1936	1937
Giro d'Italia	DNE	DNE	DNE	DNE	DNE	DNE
Stages won	—	—	—	—	—	—
Mountains classification	—	—	—	—	—	—
Tour de France	23	29	3	DNF-12	DNE	1
Stages won	1	0	5	0	—	3
Mountains classification	NR	NR	NR	NR	—	NR
Vuelta a España	N/A	N/A	N/A	DNE	DNE	N/A
Stages won	N/A	N/A	N/A	—	—	N/A
Mountains classification	N/A	N/A	N/A	—	—	N/A

Legend
1	Winner
2–3	Top three-finish
4–10	Top ten-finish
11–	Other finish
DNE	Did not enter
DNF-x	Did not finish (retired on stage x)
DNS-x	Did not start (not started on stage x)
HD-x	Finished outside time limit (occurred on stage x)
DSQ	Disqualified
N/A	Race/classification not held
NR	Not ranked in this classification
