= Hubert Deltour =

Belgian cyclist

- Deltour during the 1937 Tour de France

Personal information
- Born: 23 March 1911
- Died: 20 December 1993 (aged 82)

Cycling career
- Sport: Cycling
- Discipline: Road
- Role: Rider

Hubert Deltour (23 March 1911 – 20 December 1993) was a Belgian racing cyclist. He rode in the 1937 Tour de France.
