= Erich Bautz =

German cyclist

Personal information
- Full name: Erich Bautz
- Born: 26 May 1913 Dortmund, Germany
- Died: 17 November 1986 (aged 73) Dortmund, Germany

Cycling career
- Sport: Cycling
- Discipline: Road
- Role: Rider

Major wins
- 3 times national champion 1947 Deutschland Tour; 2 stages 1937 Tour de France

Erich Bautz (26 May 1913 – 17 September 1986) was a German racing cyclist, who won two stages in the 1937 Tour de France, and as a result wore the yellow jersey for three days.

He won the German National Road Race in 1937, 1941 and 1950.

== Major results ==
1933
Rund um Köln
1936
Rund um Köln
Saarbrucken Rundfahrt
1937
Germany national road race champion
Winner 8th stage Deutschland Tour
Winner 4th stage Tour de Luxembourg
1937 Tour de France:

Winner stage 4
Winner stage 17A

1938
Winner 5th and 13th stage Deutschland Tour
1939
Winner 3rd stage Deutschland Tour
1941
Germany national road race champion
Winner 1st stage Echarpe d'Or
1947
Winner overall classification and two stage Deutschland Tour
1948
Winner two stages Deutschland Tour
1950
Germany national road race champion
