= Mario Vicini =

Italian cyclist

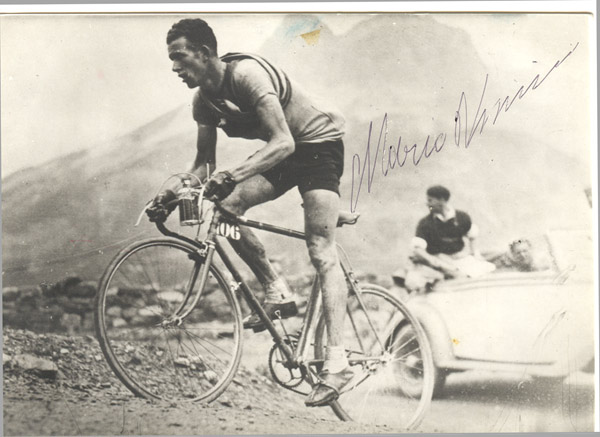

Personal information
- Full name: Mario Vicini
- Nickname: Gaibera
- Born: 21 February 1913 Cesena, Italy
- Died: 6 December 1995 (aged 82) Cesena, Italy

Cycling career
- Sport: Cycling
- Discipline: Road
- Role: Rider

Major wins
- Grand Tours Giro d'Italia 3 individual stages (1938, 1940) One-day races and Classics National Road Race Championships (1939)

Mario Vicini (21 February 1913 — 6 December 1995) was an Italian professional road bicycle racer. Vicini won the 1939 Italian road race championship, as well as the Giro del Lazio and the Giro di Toscana. He rode the Tour de France twice, finishing second (in 1937) and sixth (in 1938). In the Giro d'Italia, Vicini won three stages, and finished third in 1939. He later went on to build racing bicycles, simply named Vicini, using top-of-the-line components. His frame and fork sets are recognizable by the Vicini name stamped into the top end of the seat stay flutes and the V in the top of each side of the fork crown.

== Palmarès ==
1935
1st Giro delle Province Romagnole
1st Gran Premio di Camaiore
1936
1st Giro delle Quattro Province
1937
2nd Overall Tour de France
1938
1st Giro di Toscana
1st Stage 2 Giro d'Italia
6th Overall Tour de France
1939
1st Giro del Lazio
1st (Italy) Italian National Road Race Championship
3rd Overall Giro d'Italia
1940
1st Coppa Marin
4th Overall Giro d'Italia

1st Stages 15 & 16

1947
7th Overall Giro d'Italia
1953
1st Coppa Signorini
