= Sylvain Marcaillou =

French cyclist

Personal information
- Born: 11 February 1911 Toulouse
- Died: 28 September 2007 (aged 96) Toulouse

Cycling career
- Sport: Cycling
- Discipline: Road
- Role: Rider

Professional team
- 1932–1945: France Sport

Managerial team
- 1950–1952: Marcaillou

Sylvain Marcaillou (8 February 1911 – 28 September 2007) was a French cyclist.

Professional 1932 to 1945, he was the winner of Bordeaux-Saintes and second of Paris–Nice in 1937. He won Paris-Angers and was second place in the French National Road Race Championships in 1938. He participated in the Tour de France five times. He was 5th in 1936 and 6th in 1938.

== Major results ==
Results include:

- 2nd of Paris–Nice
- 5th of the 1937 Tour de France
- 6th of the 1939 Tour de France
- 12th of the 1936 Tour de France
- 2nd of the French National Road Race Championships
