= Herbert Muller (cyclist) =

Belgian cyclist

Personal information
- Born: 20 June 1914
- Died: 12 April 1999 (aged 84)

Cycling career
- Sport: Cycling
- Discipline: Road
- Role: Rider

Herbert Muller (20 June 1914 – 12 April 1999) was a Belgian racing cyclist. He rode in the 1937 Tour de France.
