= Paul Chocque =

French cyclist (1910–1949)

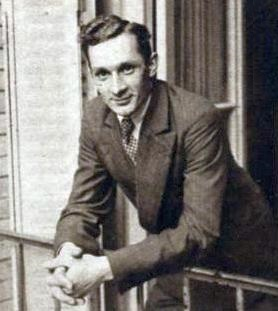

Personal information
- Full name: Paul Chocque
- Born: 14 July 1910 Meudon, France
- Died: 4 September 1949 (aged 39) Paris, France

Cycling career
- Sport: Cycling
- Discipline: Road/cyclo-cross
- Role: Rider
Medal record
Representing France
Men's track cycling
Olympic Games
Silver medal – second place	1932 Los Angeles	Team pursuit
Men's road bicycle racing
World Championships
Bronze medal – third place	1932 Rome	Amateur's Road Race

Paul Chocque (14 July 1910 – 4 September 1949) was a French professional road bicycle racer. He won a silver medal at the 1932 Summer Olympics in team pursuit event.

In 1934, Chocque traveled to Australia with Fernand Mithouard to compete in the Centenary 1000, one week road bicycle race over seven stages covering 1,102 miles (1,773 km). The race was run in as part of the celebrations of the Centenary of Victoria. Nino Borsari a member of the Italian gold medal-winning team pursuit at the 1932 Summer Olympics also competed. Chocque was in the lead at the Ballarat sprint in stage 3 when he was struck, causing him to crash, breaking his collarbone, forcing him to abandon.

Chocque performed as a professional for numerous teams from 1933 to 1949. He finished seventh and claimed two stage victories in the 1937 Tour de France, his second appearance. He also had a number of successful finishes in historic road races, including the 1936 Bordeaux-Paris victory and the 1937 Paris-Tours fourth-place finish. Chocque won the cyclo-cross French championship in 1936 and 1938. After falling during a motorized race at Paris' Parc des Princes, he died aged 39.

== Major results ==
1932
(silver) 1932 Summer Olympics, Team pursuit
1933
Circuit des Deux-Sèvres
GP Wolber
Circuit de Paris
Critérium International
Critérium National de la Route
Mont Valérien
France national cyclo-cross championship
Bordeaux–Paris
1936
Critérium International
1937
Derby de St Germain
Fourmies
Tour de France:

Winner stages 16 and 18B
7th place overall classification

1938
France national cyclo-cross championship
