= René Pedroli =

Swiss cyclist

Personal information
- Full name: René Pedroli
- Nickname: le plus Belge des Suisses
- Born: 19 July 1914 Montignies-sur-Sambre, Belgium
- Died: 17 July 1986 (aged 71) Charleroi, Belgium

Cycling career
- Sport: Cycling
- Discipline: Road
- Role: Rider

Major wins
- One stage 1937 Tour de France

René Pedroli (Montignies-sur-Sambre, Belgium, 19 July 1914 – Charleroi, Belgium, 17 July 1986) was a Swiss professional road bicycle racer. Although Pedroli was born and raised in Belgium, his parents were of Swiss nationality, and so was Pedroli. Because he was born and raised in Belgium, he mostly participated in Belgian races, even in the Belgian national championships in 1932. Pedroli was the winner of stage 12B in the 1937 Tour de France as member of the Swiss team.

== Major results ==
1937
Tour de France:

Winner stage 12B
