= Leo Amberg =

Swiss cyclist

Personal information
- Full name: Leo Amberg
- Born: 23 March 1912 Ballwil, Switzerland
- Died: 18 September 1999 (aged 87) Oberriet, Switzerland

Cycling career
- Sport: Cycling
- Discipline: Road
- Role: Rider

Major wins
- Grand Tours Tour de France 2 individual stages (1937) Giro d'Italia 1 individual stage (1938) One-day races and Classics National Road Race Championships (1937, 1938)
Medal record
Men's road bicycle racing
Representing Switzerland
World Championships
Bronze medal – third place	1938 Valkenburg	Elite Men's Road Race

Leo Amberg (23 March 1912 – 18 September 1999) was a Swiss professional road bicycle racer. He is most known for his bronze medal in the 1938 UCI Road World Championships. He was the Swiss National Road Race champion in 1937 and 1938. He also rode in the 1947 Tour de France.

== Major results ==
1935
1st Mont Faron
2nd Overall Tour de Suisse
5th Road race, UCI Road World Championships
1936
3rd Overall Tour de Suisse
8th Overall Tour de France
1937
1st Road race, National Road Championships
1st Züri-Metzgete
2nd Overall Tour de Suisse

1st Stages 1, 2 & 6

3rd Overall Tour de France

1st Stages 5c & 19b (ITT)

1938
1st Road race, National Road Championships
3rd Road race, UCI Road World Championships
1st Stage 18a Giro d'Italia
1939
1st Stage 16 Deutschland Tour
4th Züri-Metzgete
10th Overall Tour de Suisse
1942
5th Züri-Metzgete
1943
10th Züri-Metzgete
1946
9th Züri-Metzgete

Sporting positions
Preceded by Werner Buchwalder	Winner of the Züri-Metzgete; 1937	Succeeded by Hans Martin
