= Émile Gamard =

French cyclist

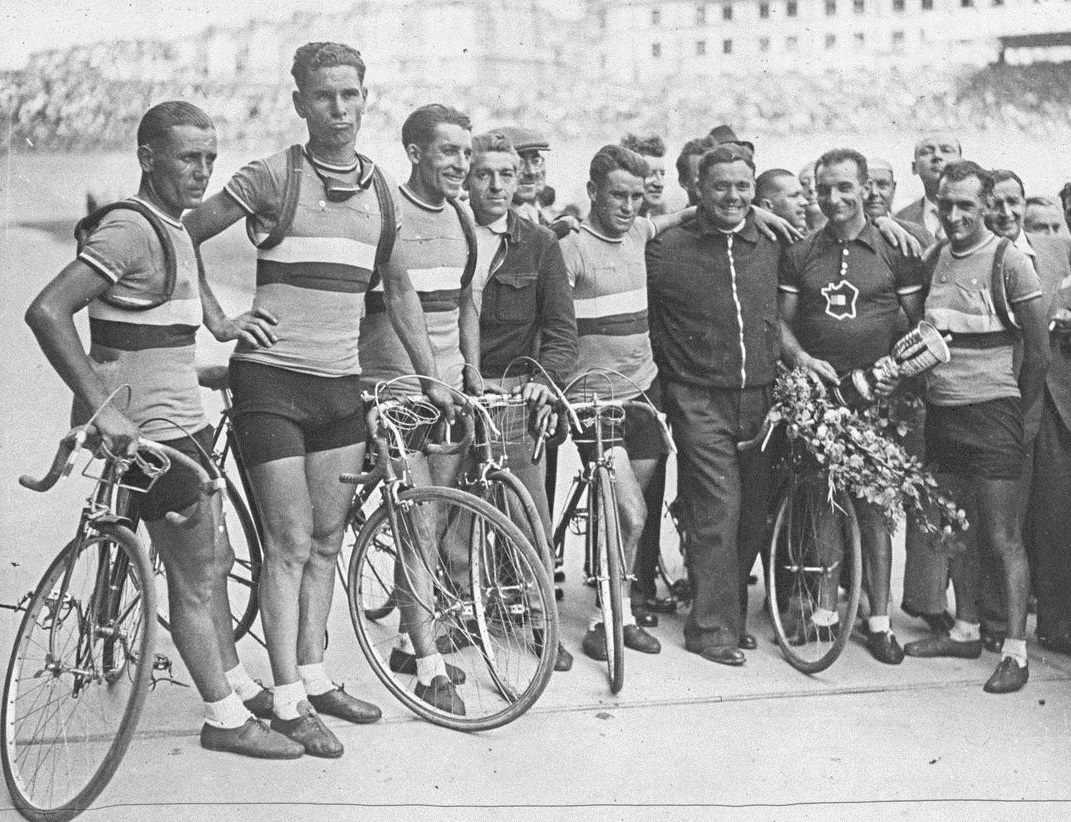

Personal information
- Born: 15 July 1911
- Died: 10 January 2004 (aged 92)

Cycling career
- Sport: Cycling
- Discipline: Road
- Role: Rider

Émile Gamard (15 July 1911 – 10 January 2004) was a French racing cyclist. He rode in the 1937 Tour de France.
