= Heinz Wengler =

German cyclist

Personal information
- Full name: Heinz Wengler
- Born: 27 September 1912 Bielefeld, Germany
- Died: 1 October 1942 (aged 30)

Cycling career
- Sport: Cycling
- Discipline: Road
- Role: Rider

Major wins
- One stage 1937 Tour de France

Heinz Wengler (27 September 1912 – 1 October 1942) was a German professional road bicycle racer. In 1937, he won one stage of the 1937 Tour de France, joint with Adolphe Braeckeveldt. Wengler was killed in action at the Eastern Front in 1942.

== Major results ==
1937
Tour de France:

Winner stage 17B (ex aequo with Adolph Braeckeveldt)
