= Augusto Introzzi =

Italian cyclist

Personal information
- Born: 8 June 1912
- Died: 17 August 1954 (aged 42)

Cycling career
- Sport: Cycling
- Discipline: Road
- Role: Rider

Augusto Introzzi (8 June 1912 – 17 August 1954) was an Italian racing cyclist. He rode in the 1937 Tour de France.
