= Henri Puppo =

Italian-French cyclist

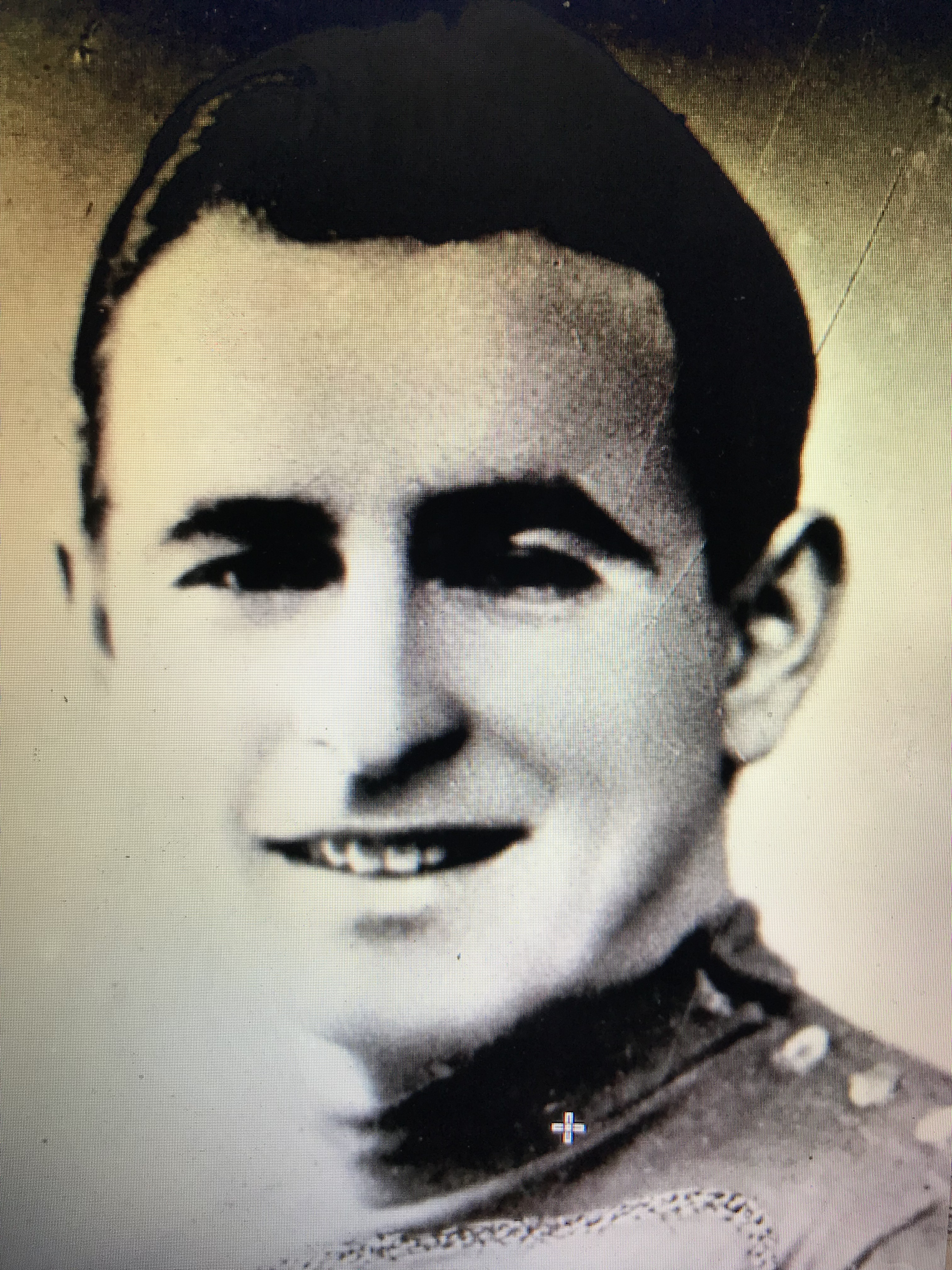

Personal information
- Full name: Henri Puppo
- Born: 5 February 1913 (age 113) Le Tignet, France

Cycling career
- Sport: Cycling
- Discipline: Road
- Role: Rider

Major wins
- Won a stage of the 1937 Tour de France

Henri Puppo (5 February 1913 in Le Tignet, Alpes-Maritimes – 7 January 2012) was a professional road bicycle racer. He was born Italian, but changed his nationality to French in 1937. Puppo won a stage of the 1937 Tour de France.

== Major results ==
1934
Boucles de Sospel
1936
Boucles de Sospel
Montpellier
1937
Circuit des Alpes
GP de Fréjus
Nice – Toulon – Nice
Tour de France:

Winner stage 5A
