= Bruno Carini =

French cyclist

Personal information
- Born: 17 November 1912
- Died: 15 August 1945 (aged 32)

Cycling career
- Sport: Cycling
- Discipline: Road
- Role: Rider

Bruno Carini (17 November 1912 – 15 August 1945) was a French racing cyclist. He rode in the 1937 Tour de France.
