= Edward Vissers =

Belgian cyclist

- Vissers in 1939

Personal information
- Full name: Edward Vissers
- Born: 4 July 1912 Antwerp, Belgium
- Died: 2 April 1994 (aged 81) Antwerp, Belgium

Cycling career
- Sport: Cycling
- Discipline: Road
- Role: Rider

Major wins
- Two stages Tour de France

Edward Vissers (4 July 1912 in Antwerp – 2 April 1994 in Antwerp) was a Belgian professional road bicycle racer. He finished in the top 10 of the Tour de France three times.

== Major results ==
1934
Aarschot
Herve
Hoboken
Oostende
1935
Antwerpen
1936
Tongeren
Wilrijk
1937
Tour de France:

Winner stage 20
6th place overall classification

1938
Tour de France:

4th place overall classification

1939
Paris - Belfort (FRA)
Tour de France:

Winner stage 9
5th place overall classification

1942
Ingelmunster
