= Adolph Braeckeveldt =

Belgian cyclist

Personal information
- Full name: Adolph Braeckeveldt
- Born: 6 October 1912 Sint-Denijs-Westrem, Belgium
- Died: 4 August 1985 (aged 72) Lovendegem, Belgium

Cycling career
- Sport: Cycling
- Discipline: Road
- Role: Rider

Major wins
- One stage 1937 Tour de France

Adolph Braeckeveldt (Sint-Denijs-Westrem, 6 October 1912 — Lovendegem, 4 August 1985) was a Belgian professional road bicycle racer. In 1937, he won one stage of the 1937 Tour de France, in a joint victory with Heinz Wengler.

== Major results ==
1935
Charleroi
GP van Noord-Vlaanderen
Kruishoutem
1936
GP de Wallonie
1937
Drie Zustersteden
Tour of Belgium
La Flèche Wallonne
1937 Tour de France:

Winner stage 17B (ex aequo with Heinz Wengler)

1938
Aalst
GP de Wallonie
GP van Noord-Vlaanderen
1939
GP de Wallonie
Zwijndrecht
1944
Sint-Eloois Winkel
