= Oskar Thierbach =

German cyclist

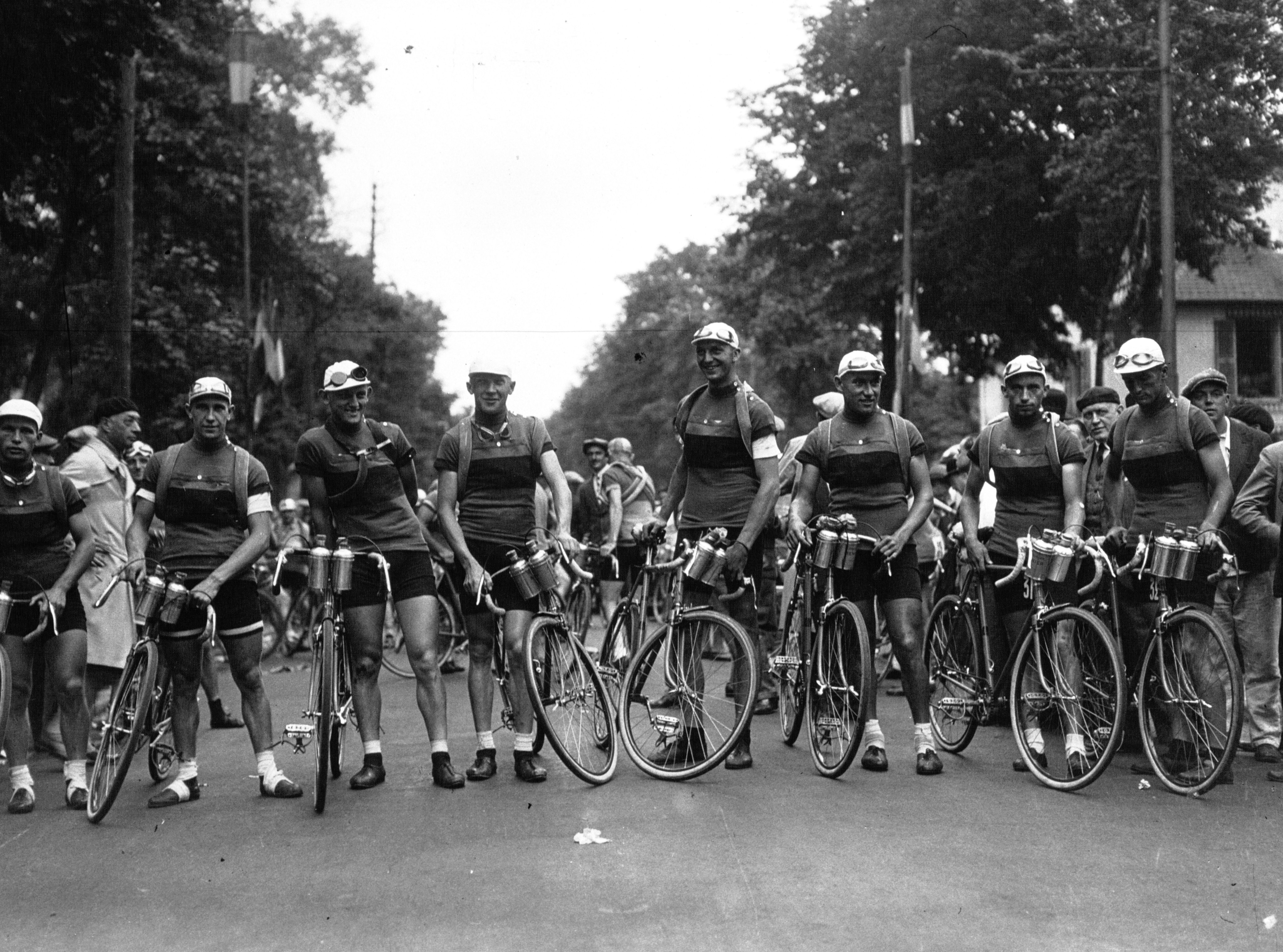

Personal information
- Full name: Oskar Thierbach
- Born: 11 February 1909 Dresden, Germany
- Died: 6 November 1991 (aged 82) Solingen, Germany

Cycling career
- Sport: Cycling
- Discipline: Road
- Role: Rider

Oskar Thierbach (11 February 1909 – 6 November 1991) was a German professional road bicycle racer. In the 1930s, he was one of the best German road racers, finishing in the top 10 of the Tour de France twice.

== Major results ==
1932
Tour de France:

7th General Classification

1934
Winner of the Harzrundfahrt:
1935
Tour de France:

10th General Classification
