= Robert Tanneveau =

French cyclist

Personal information
- Born: 25 July 1911
- Died: 15 May 1993 (aged 81)

Cycling career
- Sport: Cycling
- Discipline: Road
- Role: Rider

Robert Tanneveau (25 July 1911 – 15 May 1993) was a French racing cyclist. He rode in the 1936 Tour de France.
