= Robert Zimmermann (cyclist) =

Swiss cyclist (1912–2006)

Personal information
- Born: 27 August 1912 Zürich, Switzerland
- Died: 4 April 2006 (aged 93) Zürich, Switzerland

Cycling career
- Sport: Cycling
- Discipline: Road
- Role: Rider

Professional teams
- 1937-1938: Condor
- 1938-1939: Olympia
- 1940-1946: Condor

Major wins
- Tour de Suisse (1939)

Robert Zimmermann (27 August 1912 — 4 April 2006) was a Swiss cyclist.

== Palmares ==
1937
Annemasse-Bellegarde-Annemasse
2nd Swiss National Road Race Championships
1938
5th stage Tour de Suisse
2nd Tour de Berne
6th Tour de Suisse
1939
Tour de Suisse
4th stage Tour de Suisse
Grand Prix Le Locle
2nd Deutschland Tour
1940
Züri-Metzgete
1941
3rd stage Tour de Suisse
8th Tour de Suisse
1942
9th Züri-Metzgete
1944
9th Züri-Metzgete
1945
8th and 11th (TT) stages Volta a Catalunya
3rd Volta a Catalunya
5th Züri-Metzgete
