= 1937 Tour de France =

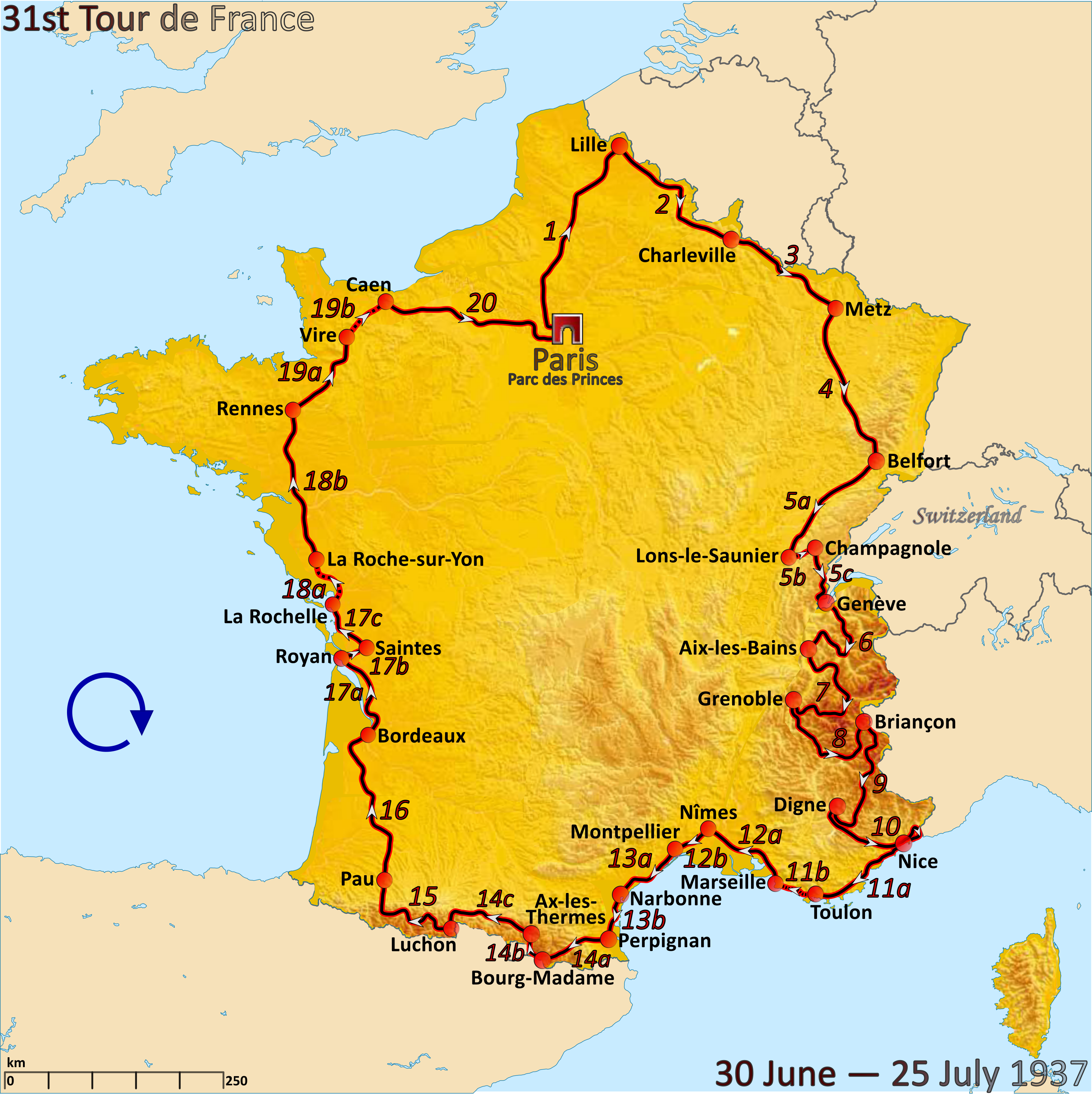
- Route of the 1937 Tour de France followed clockwise, starting in Paris

Race details
- Dates: 30 June – 25 July 1937
- Stages: 20, including eight split stages
- Distance: 4,415 km (2,743 mi)
- Winning time: 138h 58' 31"

Results
Jersey awarded to the overall winner	Winner	Roger Lapébie (FRA)	(France)
	Second	Mario Vicini (ITA)	(Individual (Note: Vicini had started as an individual, but was added to the Italian team after stage 18a.))
	Third	Léo Amberg (SUI)	(Switzerland)
	Mountains	Félicien Vervaecke (BEL)	(Belgium)
	Team	France	

The 1937 Tour de France was the 31st edition of the Tour de France, taking place from 30 June to 25 July. It consisted of 20 stages with a total length of 4,415 km (2,743 mi).

Charles Holland and Bill Burl became the first British cyclists to ride the Tour. Burl lasted only two stages, but Holland rode well until he was eliminated on stage 14c after mechanical problems. The British Empire was also represented by the only non-European in the Tour: Canadian Pierre Gachon, who never completed the first stage. The complete Belgian team (including 1936 and 1939 winner Sylvère Maes) withdraw from the race because of "French chauvinism". Complaints from the Belgian team included of French spectators throwing stones at the Belgian team, closing train crossings, and throwing pepper in the eyes, and being punished unreasonable strictly (adding extra time in the standing) while French riders were hardly punished at all while being helped.

The race was won by French cyclist Roger Lapébie.

== Innovations and changes ==
The Tours from 1903 to 1936 had all been organised by Henri Desgrange, but during the 1936 Tour de France he had to stop for health reasons, and Jacques Goddet took over. The Tour in 1937 was the first Tour where Goddet was in charge, and one of the first rules that he changed was to allow gear changes. Each team had its own car with extra material to help with mechanical problems.

== Teams ==
The Italian team, that had been absent from the 1936 Tour de France, returned in 1937, after Benito Mussolini removed their boycott of the Tour, and selected new star Gino Bartali, who had won the 1936 and 1937 Giro d'Italia, as the Italian team leader. The Italian team had 10 cyclists, just as the Belgian, German and French teams. There were also small teams of six cyclists: the Spanish, Dutch, Luxembourgian and Swiss teams. The last national team was the Great Britain-Canada team, consisting of two British cyclists and one Canadian.

The French team included Roger Lapébie. Lapébie had had a difficult relation with Desgrange. This had caused Lapébie to be out of the national team in 1935, and completely absent from the Tour in 1936. In 1937, Desgrange had retired, and Lapébie was back. In the month before the Tour started, Lapébie had undergone surgery for a lumbar hernia, and there were doubts about his form.

There were also 31 cyclists riding as individuals. These individuals were responsible for their own food and accommodation.

The teams entering the race were:

- Belgium
- Italy
- Germany
- France
- Spain
- Netherlands
- Luxembourg
- Switzerland
- Great Britain/Canada

== Route and stages ==
Stage 19b was an individual time trial, stages 5b, 11b and 18a were team time trials, although the victory was still given the cyclist who crossed the line first. At the start of the Tour, it was also the intention to run stages 12b, 13b, 14b and 17b as time trials, but during the Tour the organisation changed the format. The highest point of elevation in the race was 2,556 m (8,386 ft) at the summit tunnel of the Col du Galibier mountain pass on stage 7.

Stage characteristics and winners
Stage	Date	Course	Distance	Type (Note: The icons shown here indicate whether the stage was run as a time trial, the stage was flat or the stage included mountains for the mountains classification.)	Winner
1	30 June	Paris to Lille	263 km (163 mi)	Plain stage	Jean Majerus (LUX)
2	1 July	Lille to Charleville	192 km (119 mi)	Plain stage	Maurice Archambaud (FRA)
3	2 July	Charleville to Metz	161 km (100 mi)	Plain stage	Walter Generati (ITA)
4	3 July	Metz to Belfort	220 km (140 mi)	Stage with mountain(s)	Erich Bautz (GER)
5a	4 July	Belfort to Lons-le-Saunier	175 km (109 mi)	Plain stage	Henri Puppo (FRA)
5b	4 July	Lons-le-Saunier to Champagnole	34 km (21 mi)	Team time trial	Sylvère Maes (BEL)
5c	4 July	Champagnole to Geneva	93 km (58 mi)	Plain stage	Leo Amberg (SUI)
	5 July	Geneva		Rest day	
6	6 July	Geneva to Aix-les-Bains	180 km (110 mi)	Stage with mountain(s)	Gustaaf Deloor (BEL)
7	7 July	Aix-les-Bains to Grenoble	228 km (142 mi)	Stage with mountain(s)	Gino Bartali (ITA)
8	8 July	Grenoble to Briançon	194 km (121 mi)	Stage with mountain(s)	Otto Weckerling (GER)
9	9 July	Briançon to Digne	220 km (140 mi)	Stage with mountain(s)	Roger Lapébie (FRA)
	10 July	Digne		Rest day	
10	11 July	Digne to Nice	251 km (156 mi)	Stage with mountain(s)	Félicien Vervaecke (BEL)
	12 July	Nice		Rest day	
11a	13 July	Nice to Toulon	169 km (105 mi)	Plain stage	Éloi Meulenberg (BEL)
11b	13 July	Toulon to Marseille	65 km (40 mi)	Team time trial	Gustaaf Danneels (BEL)
12a	14 July	Marseille to Nîmes	112 km (70 mi)	Plain stage	Alphonse Antoine (FRA)
12b	14 July	Nîmes to Montpellier	51 km (32 mi)	Plain stage	René Pedroli (SUI)
13a	15 July	Montpellier to Narbonne	103 km (64 mi)	Plain stage	Francesco Camusso (ITA)
13b	15 July	Narbonne to Perpignan	63 km (39 mi)	Plain stage	Éloi Meulenberg (BEL)
	16 July	Perpignan		Rest day	
14a	17 July	Perpignan to Bourg-Madame	99 km (62 mi)	Plain stage	Éloi Meulenberg (BEL)
14b	17 July	Bourg-Madame to Ax-les-Thermes	59 km (37 mi)	Stage with mountain(s)	Mariano Cañardo (ESP)
14c	17 July	Ax-les-Thermes to Luchon	167 km (104 mi)	Stage with mountain(s)	Éloi Meulenberg (BEL)
	18 July	Luchon		Rest day	
15	19 July	Luchon to Pau	194 km (121 mi)	Stage with mountain(s)	Julián Berrendero (ESP)
	22 July	Pau		Rest day	
16	21 July	Pau to Bordeaux	235 km (146 mi)	Plain stage	Paul Chocque (FRA)
17a	22 July	Bordeaux to Royan	123 km (76 mi)	Plain stage	Erich Bautz (GER)
17b	22 July	Royan to Saintes	37 km (23 mi)	Plain stage	Adolph Braeckeveldt (BEL); Heinz Wengler (GER) (Note: Braeckeveldt and Wengler were both declared winner of stage 17b, and split the bonification time.)
17c	22 July	Saintes to La Rochelle	67 km (42 mi)	Plain stage	Roger Lapébie (FRA)
18a	23 July	La Rochelle to La Roche-sur-Yon	82 km (51 mi)	Team time trial	Roger Lapébie (FRA)
18b	23 July	La Roche-sur-Yon to Rennes	172 km (107 mi)	Plain stage	Paul Chocque (FRA)
19a	24 July	Rennes to Vire	114 km (71 mi)	Plain stage	Raymond Passat (FRA)
19b	24 July	Vire to Caen	59 km (37 mi)	Individual time trial	Leo Amberg (SUI)
20	25 July	Caen to Paris	234 km (145 mi)	Plain stage	Edward Vissers (BEL)
	Total		4,415 km (2,743 mi)		

== Race overview ==
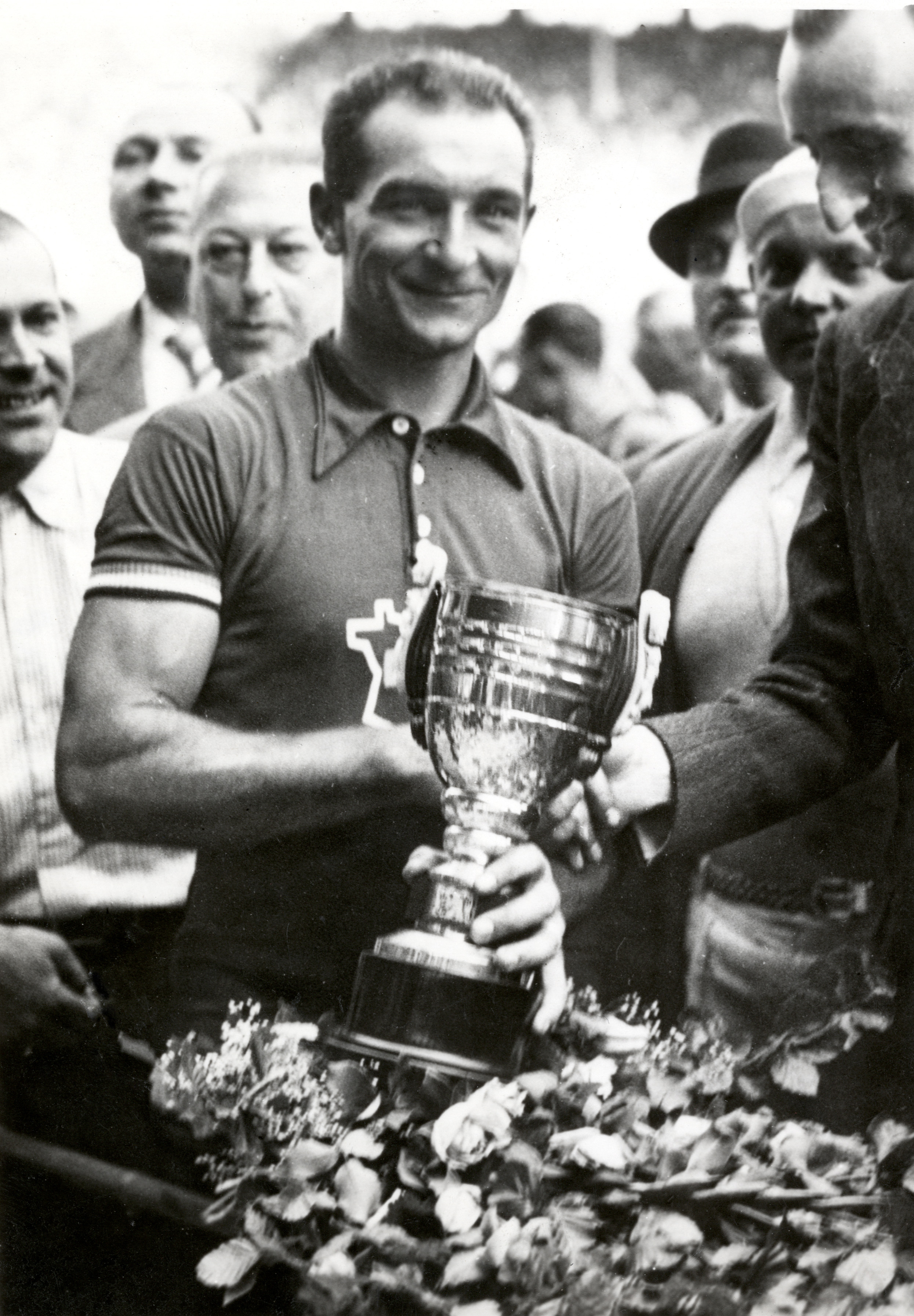
Roger Lapébie being honoured for his general classification win in the 1937 Tour in Paris

German Erich Bautz took the lead after the fourth stage, thanks to the bonification system that could give the winner of a stage some minutes bonification time. In the seventh stage, Bartali took the stage victory, and with that the lead in the general classification. He was nine minutes ahead of Ward Vissers, and that could just be enough for the Tour victory. On the eighth stage, Bartali could not avoid his teammate Jules Rossi who crashed right in front of him, and Bartali fell into a river. He got up and was able to finish the stage. He lost 10 minutes and kept the lead, but in the next stage he lost more than twenty minutes, and in the twelfth stage he gave up.

In the ninth stage, Sylvère Maes took over the lead, closely followed by Mario Vicini and Roger Lapébie. At that point, the French team was already down to six cyclists. These six cyclists had a meeting, and decided that Lapébie would be the team leader, as the rest of the team was already to far behind to have any chance for the final victory.

Before the start of the fifteenth stage, Lapébie found out that the frame of his bicycle had been sabotaged, causing his handlebars to break off. Lapébie made quick repairs and just made it to the start of the stage, but his newly constructed bicycle did not have a water holder, and he had to start the stage without water. This demotivated him, and Lapébie began losing time early in the stage. That stage included four mountains, and on top of the second mountain Lapébie was already five minutes behind, and wanted to give up. A teammate inspired him to go on, and Lapébie started to win back time. When Maes punctured, Lapébie was able to reach him, and at the end of the stage only Julián Berrendero was in front of them, and Lapébie won the sprint for the second place. This rewarded him with 45 seconds bonification time. When the tour directors gave him 90 seconds penalty time for having been pushed, the margin with Maes grew to more than three minutes, but Lapébie had sensed weakness in the Belgian team, and planned to attack in the next stage. The Belgian team complained that the penalty was far too little, because Lapébie's advantage had been much more. The French team threatened to abandon the race if the penalty would be increased, and the Tour direction did not change the penalty.

In the sixteenth stage Lapébie finished ahead of Maes, and cut the margin down to only 25 seconds, but with only flat stage that could be enough for Maes. During that sixteenth stage, Maes had punctured, and had been help by two Belgian cyclists, Gustaaf Deloor and Adolf Braeckeveldt. However, these Belgian cyclists rode as "individuals", and were not part of the Belgian team. The Tour jury then fined Maes with 15 seconds penalty time in the general classification. During the race, a train crossing had been closed just after Lapébie had passed, and just before Maes was about to pass. Maes was offended by all this, and quit the race, together with the rest of the Belgian team. From that point on, it was easy for Lapébie to secure his victory.

== Classification leadership and minor prizes ==
The time that each cyclist required to finish each stage was recorded, and these times were added together for the general classification. If a cyclist had received a time bonus, it was subtracted from this total; all time penalties were added to this total. The cyclist with the least accumulated time was the race leader, identified by the yellow jersey. Leo Amberg became the first Swiss cyclist to reach the podium of the general classification in the Tour de France.

For the mountains classification, 17 mountains were selected by the Tour organisation. After the last mountain in the fifteenth stage, the classification was won by Félicien Vervaecke. Vervaecke did not finish the Tour, but in 1937 that was not needed to win the mountains classification.

The team classification was calculated in 1937 by adding up the times of the best three cyclists of a team; the team with the least time was the winner. The time for the Spanish team, which finished with only two cyclists, was calculated by adding the time of the final rider in the general classification, plus one hour penalty time. The Belgian, Dutch, and British-Canadian teams did not finish with two or more cyclists, so they were not eligible for the team classification.

Classification leadership by stage
Stage	Winner	General classification	Mountains classification (Note: No jersey was awarded to the leader of the mountains classification until a white jersey with red polka dots was introduced in 1975.)	Classification for individuals	Team classification
1	Jean Majerus	Jean Majerus	no award	Adolphe Braeckeveldt	Luxembourg
2	Maurice Archambaud	Jean Majerus	no award	Adolphe Braeckeveldt	France
3	Walter Generati	Marcel Kint	no award	Adolphe Braeckeveldt	Belgium
4	Erich Bautz	Erich Bautz	Erich Bautz	Adolphe Braeckeveldt	Germany
5a	Henri Puppo	Erich Bautz	Erich Bautz	Adolphe Braeckeveldt	Luxembourg
5b	Sylvère Maes	Erich Bautz	Erich Bautz	Adolphe Braeckeveldt	Luxembourg
5c	Leo Amberg	Erich Bautz	Erich Bautz	Adolphe Braeckeveldt	Luxembourg
6	Gustaaf Deloor	Erich Bautz	Gino Bartali	Adolphe Braeckeveldt	Belgium
7	Gino Bartali	Gino Bartali	Gino Bartali	Adolphe Braeckeveldt	France
8	Otto Weckerling	Gino Bartali	Gino Bartali	Adolphe Braeckeveldt	France
9	Roger Lapébie	Sylvère Maes	Félicien Vervaecke	Mario Vicini	Belgium
10	Félicien Vervaecke	Sylvère Maes	Félicien Vervaecke	Mario Vicini	Belgium
11a	Éloi Meulenberg	Sylvère Maes	Félicien Vervaecke	Mario Vicini	Belgium
11b	Gustaaf Danneels	Sylvère Maes	Félicien Vervaecke	Mario Vicini	Belgium
12a	Alphonse Antoine	Sylvère Maes	Félicien Vervaecke	Mario Vicini	Belgium
12b	René Pedroli	Sylvère Maes	Félicien Vervaecke	Mario Vicini	Belgium
13a	Francesco Camusso	Sylvère Maes	Félicien Vervaecke	Mario Vicini	Belgium
13b	Éloi Meulenberg	Sylvère Maes	Félicien Vervaecke	Mario Vicini	Belgium
14a	Éloi Meulenberg	Sylvère Maes	Félicien Vervaecke	Mario Vicini	Belgium
14b	Mariano Cañardo	Sylvère Maes	Félicien Vervaecke	Mario Vicini	Belgium
14c	Éloi Meulenberg	Sylvère Maes	Félicien Vervaecke	Mario Vicini	Belgium
15	Julián Berrendero	Sylvère Maes	Félicien Vervaecke	Mario Vicini	Belgium
16	Paul Chocque	Sylvère Maes	Félicien Vervaecke	Mario Vicini	Belgium
17a	Erich Bautz	Roger Lapébie	Félicien Vervaecke	Mario Vicini	France
17b	Adolph Braeckeveldt; Heinz Wengler	Roger Lapébie	Félicien Vervaecke	Mario Vicini	France
17c	Roger Lapébie	Roger Lapébie	Félicien Vervaecke	Mario Vicini	France
18a	Roger Lapébie	Roger Lapébie	Félicien Vervaecke	Mario Vicini	France
18b	Paul Chocque	Roger Lapébie	Félicien Vervaecke	Mario Vicini	France
19a	Raymond Passat	Roger Lapébie	Félicien Vervaecke	Mario Vicini	France
19b	Leo Amberg	Roger Lapébie	Félicien Vervaecke	Mario Vicini	France
20	Edward Vissers	Roger Lapébie	Félicien Vervaecke	Mario Vicini	France
Final		Roger Lapébie	Félicien Vervaecke	Mario Vicini	France

== Final standings ==
=== General classification ===
Final general classification (1–10)
Rank	Rider	Team	Time
1	Roger Lapébie (FRA)	France	138h 58' 31"
2	Mario Vicini (ITA)	Individual	+ 7' 17"
3	Leo Amberg (SUI)	Switzerland	+ 26' 13"
4	Francesco Camusso (ITA)	Italy	+ 26' 53"
5	Sylvain Marcaillou (FRA)	France	+ 35' 36"
6	Edouard Vissers (BEL)	Individual	+ 38' 13"
7	Paul Chocque (FRA)	France	+ 1h 05' 19"
8	Pierre Gallien (FRA)	Individual	+ 1h 06' 33"
9	Erich Bautz (GER)	Germany	+ 1h 06' 41"
10	Jean Frechaut (FRA)	Individual	+ 1h 24' 34"

Final general classification (11–46)
Rank	Rider	Sponsor	Time
11	Herbert Muller (BEL)	Individual	+ 1h 26' 51"
12	Raymond Passat (FRA)	Individual	+ 1h 27' 58"
13	Marcel Laurent (FRA)	Individual	+ 1h 31' 57"
14	Oskar Thierbach (GER)	Germany	+ 1h 34' 27"
15	Julián Berrendero (ESP)	Spain	+ 1h 34' 48"
16	Gustaaf Deloor (BEL)	Individual	+ 1h 36' 03"
17	Victor Cosson (FRA)	Individual	+ 1h 38' 55"
18	Jean-Marie Goasmat (FRA)	Individual	+ 1h 39' 36"
19	Sauveur Ducazeaux (FRA)	Individual	+ 1h 41' 21"
20	Robert Oubron (FRA)	Individual	+ 1h 46' 09"
21	Robert Tanneveau (FRA)	France	+ 1h 47' 03"
22	Adolf Braeckeveldt (BEL)	Individual	+ 1h 52' 29"
23	Henri Puppo (FRA)	Individual	+ 1h 56' 38"
24	Giuseppe Martano (ITA)	Italy	+ 1h 58' 33"
25	Fabien Galateau (FRA)	Individual	+ 2h 04' 20"
26	Augusto Introzzi (ITA)	Italy	+ 2h 09' 49"
27	Arsène Mersch (LUX)	Luxembourg	+ 2h 15' 43"
28	Ludwig Geyer (GER)	Germany	+ 2h 16' 31"
29	Paul Egli (SUI)	Switzerland	+ 2h 27' 54"
30	Mariano Cañardo (ESP)	Spain	+ 2h 35' 11"
31	Robert Zimmermann (SUI)	Switzerland	+ 2h 44' 23"
32	Pierre Cloarec (FRA)	Individual	+ 2h 46' 06"
33	Antoon Van Schendel (NED)	Netherlands	+ 2h 53' 14"
34	Gabriel Dubois (FRA)	Individual	+ 3h 11' 32"
35	Jean Goujon (FRA)	Individual	+ 3h 19' 16"
36	Carlo Romanatti (ITA)	Italy	+ 3h 19' 29"
37	Heinz Wengler (GER)	Germany	+ 3h 28' 04"
38	François Neuens (LUX)	Luxembourg	+ 3h 32' 10"
39	René Pedroli (SUI)	Switzerland	+ 4h 02' 48"
40	Raymond Lemarié (FRA)	Individual	+ 4h 08' 12"
41	Otto Weckerling (GER)	Germany	+ 4h 19' 08"
42	Bruno Carini (FRA)	Individual	+ 4h 27' 42"
43	Herbert Hauswald (GER)	Germany	+ 5h 03' 09"
44	Émile Gamard (FRA)	France	+ 5h 52' 42"
45	Reinhold Wendel (GER)	Germany	+ 6h 15' 29"
46	Aloïs Klensch (LUX)	Luxembourg	+ 6h 39' 25"

=== Mountains classification ===
Mountains in the mountains classification
Stage	Rider	Height	Mountain range	Winner
4	Ballon d'Alsace	1,178 metres (3,865 ft)	Vosges	Erich Bautz
6	Aravis	1,498 metres (4,915 ft)	Alps	Gino Bartali
6	Tamié	920 metres (3,020 ft)	Alps	Félicien Vervaecke
7	Galibier	2,556 metres (8,386 ft)	Alps	Gino Bartali
8	Laffrey	900 metres (3,000 ft)	Alps	Gino Bartali
9	Izoard	2,361 metres (7,746 ft)	Alps	Julián Berrendero
9	Vars	2,110 metres (6,920 ft)	Alps	Edward Vissers
9	Allos	2,250 metres (7,380 ft)	Alps	Mario Vicini
10	Braus	1,002 metres (3,287 ft)	Alps-Maritimes	Félicien Vervaecke
10	La Turbie	555 metres (1,821 ft)	Alps-Maritimes	Henri Puppo
14b	Puymorens	1,920 metres (6,300 ft)	Pyrenees	Julián Berrendero
14c	Port	1,249 metres (4,098 ft)	Pyrenees	Julián Berrendero
14c	Portet d'Aspet	1,069 metres (3,507 ft)	Pyrenees	Julián Berrendero
15	Peyresourde	1,569 metres (5,148 ft)	Pyrenees	Julián Berrendero
15	Aspin	1,489 metres (4,885 ft)	Pyrenees	Julián Berrendero
15	Tourmalet	2,115 metres (6,939 ft)	Pyrenees	Julián Berrendero
15	Aubisque	1,709 metres (5,607 ft)	Pyrenees	Mario Vicini

Final mountains classification (1–10)
Rank	Rider	Team	Points
1	Félicien Vervaecke (BEL)	Belgium	114
2	Mario Vicini (ITA)	Individual	96
3	Sylvère Maes (BEL)	Belgium	90
4	Julián Berrendero (ESP)	Spain	75
5	Ward Vissers (BEL)	Individual	66
6	Jules Lowie (BEL)	Belgium	57
7	Gino Bartali (ITA)	Italy	50
7	Pierre Gallien (FRA)	Touriste-routier	50
9	Marcel Kint (BEL)	Belgium	29
10	Fédérico Ezquerra (ESP)	Spain	27

=== Team classification ===
Final team classification (1–6)
Rank	Team	Time
1	France	418h 36' 28"
2	Italy	+ 2h 54' 18"
3	Germany	+ 3h 12' 22"
4	Switzerland	+ 3h 57' 35"
5	Spain	+ 10h 04' 07"
6	Luxembourg	+ 10h 42' 01"

== Aftermath ==
The riders in the individual category had performed very well in the 1937 Tour de France; the second-placed cyclist in the general classification had started in the individuals category, as were in total twelve cyclists in the top twenty. Still, the category was removed after 1937.

== Bibliography ==
- Augendre, Jacques (2016). Guide historique [Historical guide] (PDF) (in French). Paris: Amaury Sport Organisation. Archived (PDF) from the original on 17 August 2016.
- McGann, Bill; McGann, Carol (2006). The Story of the Tour de France: 1903–1964. Vol. 1. Indianapolis: Dog Ear Publishing. ISBN 978-1-59858-180-5.
- Nauright, John; Parrish, Charles (2012). Sports Around the World: History, Culture, and Practice. Vol. 2. Santa Barbara, California: ABC-CLIO. ISBN 978-1-59884-300-2.
