= Paul Egli =

Swiss cyclist (1911–1997)

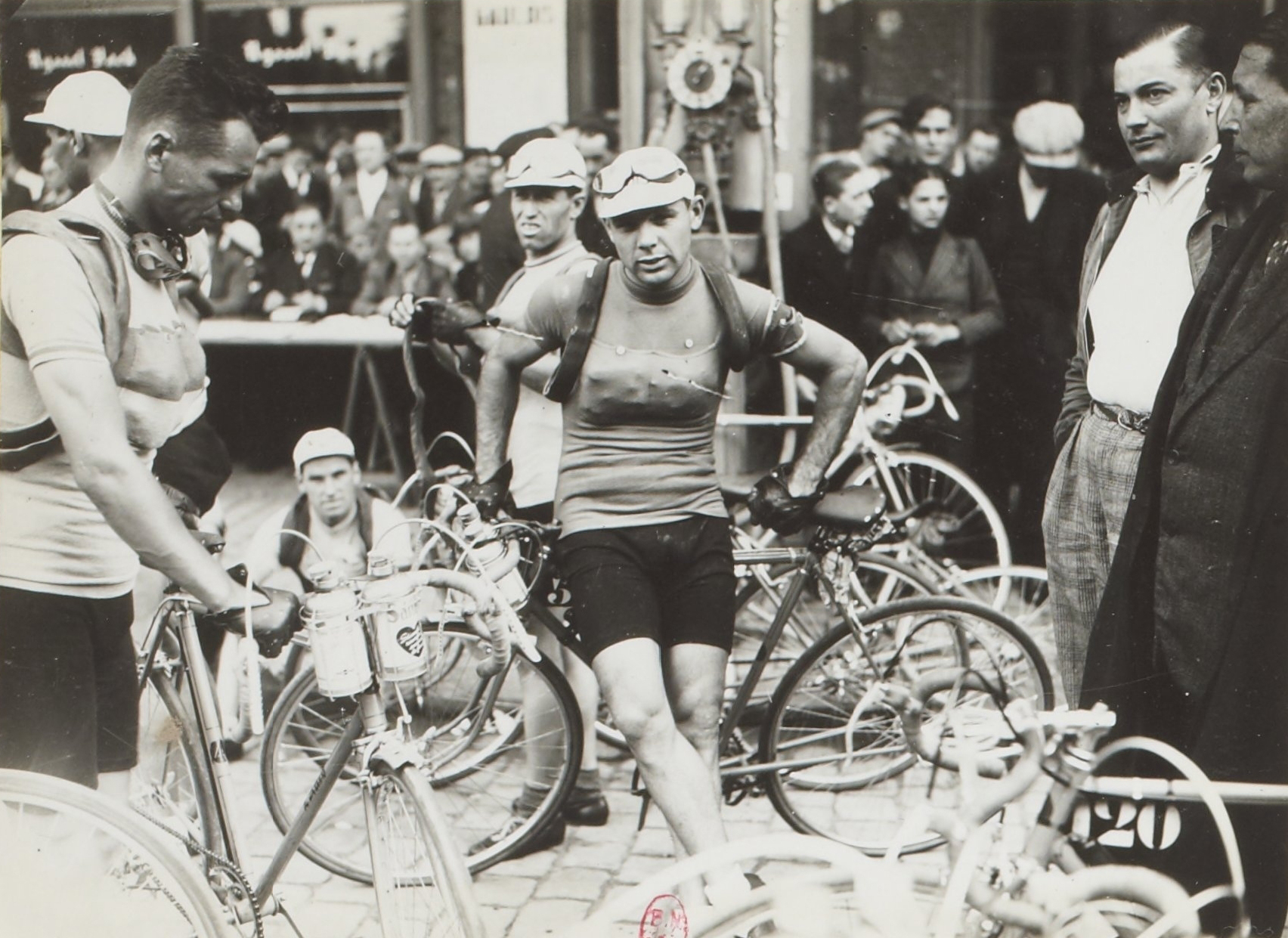
- Tour de France de 1936 - 26

Personal information
- Full name: Paul Egli
- Born: 18 August 1911
- Died: 23 January 1997 (aged 85)

Cycling career
- Sport: Cycling
- Discipline: Road
- Role: Rider

Major wins
- silver medal 1938 Road World Championships bronze medal 1937 Road World Championships
Medal record
Men's road bicycle racing
Representing Switzerland
World Championships
Gold medal – first place	1933 Montlhéry	Amateur's Road Race
Silver medal – second place	1938 Valkenburg	Elite Men's Road Race
Silver medal – second place	1932 Rome	Amateur's Road Race
Bronze medal – third place	1937 Copenhagen	Elite Men's Road Race

Paul Egli (18 August 1911 – 23 January 1997) was a Swiss professional road bicycle racer. He is most known for his silver and bronze medals in respectively the 1938 and the 1937 UCI Road World Championships. He was also the Swiss National Road Race champion in 1935 and 1936.

== Major results ==
1932
Switzerland Amateur Cyclo-Cross Champion
(silver) World Amateur Road Race Championship
1933
World Amateur Road Race Champion
1934
Züri-Metzgete
Stage 3, Tour de Suisse
Stage 1, Critérium du Midi
1935
Switzerland Road Race Champion
Züri-Metzgete
Stage 1, Tour of Nord-East-Spain
1936
Switzerland Road Race Champion
Tour de France

Winner stage 1
Wearing yellow jersey for one day

Tour de Suisse:

Winner Stages 4a & 4b

1937
(bronze) World Road Race Championship
Tour de Suisse:

Winner Stage 3

1938
(silver) World Road Race Championship
1941
Berner Rundfahrt
1942
Züri-Metzgete

Sporting positions
Preceded by Walter Blattmann	Winner of the Züri-Metzgete; 1934–1935	Succeeded by Werner Buchwalder
Preceded by Walter Diggelmann	Winner of the Züri-Metzgete; 1942	Succeeded by Ferdinand Kübler
