= List of career achievements by Rik Van Steenbergen =

Belgian cyclist

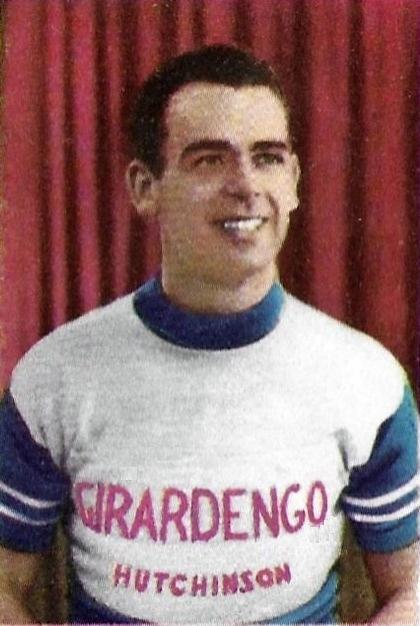
- Van Steenbergen around 1952

Cycling career
- Sport: Cycling

Major wins
- Grand Tours Tour de France 4 individual stages (1949, 1952, 1955) Giro d'Italia Sprints classification (1954, 1957) 15 individual stages (1951, 1952, 1953, 1954, 1957, 1957) Vuelta a España Points classification (1956) 6 individual stages (1956) Stage races Tour de l'Ouest (1951) Vuelta a la Argentina (1952) One-day races and Classics World Road Race Championships (1949, 1956, 1957) National Road Race Championships (1943, 1945, 1954) Tour of Flanders (1944, 1946) Dwars door Vlaanderen (1945) Paris–Roubaix (1948, 1952) La Flèche Wallonne (1949, 1958) Paris–Brussels (1950) Milan–San Remo (1954) Other Ruban Jaune (1948->1955) Critérium des As (1948, 1952, 1955, 1957, 1958) Track Championships National Track Championships Madison (1955, 1961) Omnium (1944, 1955, 1961, 1963) Men's Individual Pursuit (1944) Derny (1961, 1962, 1963, 1964) European Track Championships Madison (1958, 1959, 1960, 1961, 1963) Omnium (1959)
Medal record
Representing Belgium
Men's road bicycle racing
World Championships
Gold medal – first place	1949 Copenhagen	Professional Road Race
Gold medal – first place	1956 Copenhagen	Professional Road Race
Gold medal – first place	1957 Waregem	Professional Road Race
Bronze medal – third place	1946 Zürich	Professional Road Race
Men's track cycling
European Championships
Gold medal – first place	1958 Kopenhagen	Madison
Gold medal – first place	1959 Dortmund	Omnium
Gold medal – first place	1959 Zürich	Madison
Gold medal – first place	1960 Antwerp	Madison
Gold medal – first place	1961 Köln	Madison
Gold medal – first place	1963 Brussels	Madison
Silver medal – second place	1962 Dortmund	Omnium
Silver medal – second place	1963 Antwerp	Derny
Silver medal – second place	1964 Antwerp	Derny
Silver medal – second place	1965 Bremen	Madison
Silver medal – second place	1966 Brussels	Madison
Silver medal – second place	1966 Köln	Omnium
Bronze medal – third place	1956 Zürich	Omnium
Bronze medal – third place	1961 Kopenhagen	Omnium
Bronze medal – third place	1962 Zürich	Madison
Bronze medal – third place	1963 Köln	Omnium

This is a list of career achievements by Rik Van Steenbergen, a Belgian former professional road and track bicycle racer, who rode professionally between 1942 and 1966. Van Steenbergen is noted as one of the best sprinters of his generation and is a winner of a number of one-day races and stage races. Van Steenbergen won 25 Grand Tour stages during his career; four at the Tour de France, fifteen at the Giro d'Italia and six at the Vuelta a España. As a track cyclist, he won a record of 1,314 races, of which national and European titles in different disciplines and forty six-day races.

== Major results ==
=== Road ===
1942
1st National Road Championships - Interclubs road race
1st Antwerp provincial championship
1st in 3 stages of Omloop van Vlaanderen
1943
National Road Championships

1st Road race
1st Interclubs road race

1st Championship of Flanders
1st Brussels, Charleroi, Eke, Erpe-Mere, Herk-de-Stad, Herstal, La Louvière, Liège-Coronmeuse, Mol, Niel, Oedelem, Waregem
1944
1st Tour of Flanders
1st Omloop der Vlaamse Gewesten
1st Charleroi, Liège, Verviers
1945
1st National Road Championships - Road race
1st Dwars door België
1st Brussels–Ingooigem
1st Charleroi, Heusden, La Louvière, Mol, Neerpelt, Nieuwerkerken, Retie
1946
3rd UCI Road World Championships Road race
1st Tour of Flanders
1st Tour des Quatre-Cantons (fr)
1st Brussels, Genève, La Chaux-de-Fonds, Lausanne, Marchienne-au-Pont, Neuchâtel, Retie, Saint-Gall, Schoenerwerd, Terkmerenbos, Turnhout, Waregem, Westerlo, Zürich
1947
Tour de Luxembourg

1st Stage 4

1st GP de Soignies
1st Antwerp, Brussels, Grobbendonk, Tesenderlo, Turnhout, Zwijndrecht
1948
1st Paris–Roubaix
1st Omloop der drie Provinciën
1st Critérium des As
1st Charleroi, Doornik, Jumet, Kessel-Lo, Overpelt, Sint-Niklaas, Stabroek, Turnhout
1949
1st UCI Road World Championships, Road race
Tour de France

1st Stages 12 & 21

1st La Flèche Wallonne
1st Tour of Limburg
1st Barvaux, Berlaar, Brussels, Charleroi, Croisé-Laroche, Halluin, Houthalen, Mechelen, Pâturages
1950
1st Paris–Brussels
1st Grand Prix d'Europe
1st Bordighera, Kortrijk, Mortsel, Oude God, Ronse, 's-Hertogenbosch, Saint-Amand les Eux
1951
2nd Overall Giro d'Italia

1st Stages 1 & 15
Held after Stages 1, 7, & 13–17
1st Best foreign rider

1st Overall Tour de l'Ouest

1st Stage 2, 4 and 7

1st Grand Prix d'Europe
1st Niel–St Truiden
1st Bâle, Mauberge, Recanati, Sain-Méen le Grand, Zonhoven
2nd Critérium des As
3rd Paris–Roubaix
1952
Giro d'Italia

1st Stages 6, 9 & 10

Tour de France

1st Stage 1
Held after Stages 1–2

1st Paris–Roubaix
1st Overall Vuelta a la Argentina

1st Stages 1, 8, 12 & 13

Roma–Napoli–Roma

1st Stage 4

1st Critérium des As
1st Boucles de l'Aulne
1st Stage 4 Roma–Napoli–Roma
1st Amiens, Charlieu, Jambes, Jemappes, Recanati, Roue d'Or
1953
Giro d'Italia

1st Stage 9

1st Haumont, Lille, Pleurtuit, Troyes
1954
1st National Road Championships - Road race
Giro d'Italia

1st Stages 5, 16, 17 & 22
1st sprints classification

1st Milan–San Remo
1st Alessandria, Arendonck, Bâle
3rd Roma–Napoli–Roma
1955
Tour de France

1st Stage 16

1st Critérium des As
1st Stage 1b (TTT) Driedaagse van Antwerpen
1st Omloop van Limburg
1st Antwerp, Auch, Bâle, Brussels, Ede, Peer, Sint-Michiels
3rd Tour of Flanders
1956
1st UCI Road World Championships, Road race
5th Overall Vuelta a España

1st Stages 1, 7, 8, 11, 14 & 17
1st Points classification

Tour de l'Ouest

1st Stage 8

1st Omloop van Limburg
1st Acht van Chaam
1st Hanret, Lokeren, Turnhout, Virton, Zingem
2nd Critérium des As
3rd Paris-Brussels
1957
1st UCI Road World Championships, Road race
Giro d'Italia

1st Stages 1, 11, 17b, 20 & 21
1st sprints classification

Roma–Napoli–Roma

1st Stages 1b and 5b

1st Critérium des As
1st Stage 3 Driedaagse van Antwerpen
1st Antwerp, Chambéry, Dendermonde, Elisabethville, Hanret, Herenthals, Léopoldville, Londerzeel, Mellebeke, Namur, Ruisbroek, Turnhout, Wavre, Willebroek
2nd Paris-Roubaix
1958
1st La Flèche Wallonne
Tour of the Netherlands

1st Stage 4a

1st Acht van Chaam
1st Critérium des As
1st Overall GP Bali

1st Stage 1

1st Aalst, Aarschot, Arlon, Brest, Chambéry, Charleroi, Châteauneuf, Hanret, Montignes-en-Goële, Saint-Pierre le Moutier, Sllanches, Woluwé
1959
1st National Road Championships - Interclubs road race
Tour de l'Ouest

1st Stage 3

1st Flèche Halloise
1st Aalst, Amiens, Belsele, Brasschaat, Charleroi, Cremone, De Panne, Geneve, Halle, Hanret, Heldesheim, Leuze, Locarno, Leuven, Zandhoven
2nd Milan-San Remo
1960
1st Acht van Chaam
1st Aalst, Dendermonde, Deurne, Eizer, Hanret, Londerzeel, Mol, Neuvic, Overijse, Vergt
2nd Critérium des As
1961
1st National Road Championships - Interclubs team time trial
1st Elfstedenronde
1st Grote Prijs Stad Sint-Niklaas
1st Bourcefranc, Bree, Daumesnil, Houthalen, Knokke, Riom, Rodez, Saint-Macaire-en-Mauges, Tongeren, Tothout, Woluwe
2nd Tour d'Hesbaye
2nd Critérium des As
1962
1st National Road Championships - Interclubs team time trial
1st Bourcefranc, De Panne, Dendermonde, Deurne, Lokeren, Made, Pleslin, Roim, Zwijdrecht
1963
1st Arendonk, Herenthals, Lokeren
1964
1st Bacaldo
1965

=== Track ===
1942
1st National Track Championships juniors – Men's sprint
1st Madison in Brussels
1st Omnium in Antwerp, Brussels
1943
1st Madison in Antwerp (x2), Brussels, Maldegem, Rocourt
1st Omnium in Antwerp (x5), Brussels, Ghent (x2), Maldegem
1st Pursuit in Ghent (x5)
1st Sprint in Antwerp, Brussels
2nd National Track Championships – Omnium
1944
National Track Championships

1st Omnium
1st Men's individual pursuit

1st Madison in Montaigu (x2), Rocourt, Sint-Niklaas, Zwartberg
1st Omnium in Antwerp, Ghent, Brussels (x3), Paris, Sint-Niklaas (x3), Zwartberg
1st Pursuit in Antwerp, Brussels
1st Sprint in Zwartberg
1945
1st Madison in Ghent, Zwartberg
1st Omnium in Brussels (x5)
2nd National Track Championships – Men's individual pursuit
1946
1st Madison in Bruges, Ghent, Genève, Ostend, Paris, Zürich
1st Omnium in Antwerp (x2), Bruges (x2), Brussels (x7), Ghent (x3), Ostend, Paris (x2), Rocourt, Zürich
1st Pursuit in Brussels (x2), Ghent (x3)
1st Sprint in Maldegem
1st Prix Hourlier-Comès (with Marcel Kint)
1947
1st Madison in Antwerp, Brussels, Ghent (x2), Herne Hill, Luxembourg, Ostend, Zürich
1st Omnium in Antwerp (x3), Bruges, Brussels (x3), Ghent (x3), Ostend, Paris
1st Pursuit in Antwerp (x3), Brussels, Ghent (x3)
2nd Six Days of Ghent (with Robert Naeye)
1948
1st Six Days of Brussels (with Marcel Kint)
1st Madison in Bruges, Brussels (x2), Ostend
1st Omnium in Antwerp, Brussels (x2), Ghent, Genève, Heist-op-den-Berg, Marcinelle, Milan, Mons-Crotteux, Paris, Rocourt
1st Pursuit in Antwerp, Paris
1st Sprint in Bruges, Genève
2nd Prix du Salon (with Marcel Kint)
3rd National Track Championships – Men's individual pursuit
3rd Six Days of Antwerp (with Stan Ockers)
1949
1st Six Days of Brussels (with Marcel Kint)
1st Madison in Amsterdam, Antwerp (x2), Bruges, Ghent, Heist-op-den-Berg, Liederkerke, Lommel, Marcinelle, Niedercorn, Rocourt, Rouen, Turin, Zürich
1st Derny in Brussels
1st Omnium in Antwerp, Brussels (x2), Copenhagen, Ghent, Heist-op-den-Berg, Marcinelle (x2), Moorslede, Paris, Rocourt, Zürich
1st Pursuit in Brussels
2nd Six Days of Ghent (with Marcel Kint)
3rd Six Days of Paris (with Marcel Kint)
1950
1st Six Days of Antwerp (with Achiel Bruneel)
1st Madison in Antwerp, Brussels (x2), Ostend, Walem
1st Derny in Heist-op-den-Berg, Rocourt, Ronse
1st Omnium in Antwerp (x3), Brussels (x2), Ghent (x3), Heist-op-den-Berg, Luxembourg, Paris, Turin, Walem
2nd Six Days of Ghent (with Robert Naeye)
1951
1st Six Days of Brussels (with Stan Ockers)
1st Madison in Alger, Antwerp, Brussels (x2), Montceau-les-Mines, Rocourt (x2), Zwartberg
1st Omnium in Alger, Antwerp (x2), Brussels, Copenhagen, Liederkerke (x2), Ostend, Marcinelle, Rocourt, Zürich (x3), Zwartberg
2nd Six Days of Ghent (with Achiel Bruneel)
3rd Six Days of Paris (with Raymond Goussot)
1952
1st Six Days of Paris (with Raymond Goussot)
1st Madison in Alger, Buenos-Aires (x2), Cavaillon, Colmar, Lyon, Milan, Montceau-les-Mines, Montluçon, Rennes, Mans
1st Derny in Paris
1st Omnium in Copenhagen, Lyon Milan, Paris, Rocourt, Zwartberg
2nd Six Days of Antwerp (with Achiel Bruneel)
3rd Six Days of Dortmund (with Gustav Killian)
1953
1st Prix du Salon (with Stan Ockers)
1st Madison in Antwerp, Barcelona, Brussels (x2), Marcinelle, Paris (x2), Rocourt (x2), Toulon
1st Derny in Antwerp, Brussels
1st Omnium in Antwerp (x2), Copenhagen, Milan, Paris, Port-de-Bouc, Rocourt, Saint-Étienne, Zwartberg
1st Sprint in Modena
2nd Six Days of Paris (with Achiel Bruneel)
3rd Six Days of Brussels (with Stan Ockers)
1954
1st Six Days of Ghent (with Stan Ockers)
1st Madison in Antwerp, Brussels (x2), Milan, Roanne, Rocourt, Sint-Amands, Turin, Zwartberg
1st Derny in Lyon, Roanne
1st Omnium in Antwerp (x2), Brussels
1st Pursuit in Milan, Roanne
1st Sprint in Limoges, Saint-Étienne
2nd Six Days of Berlin (with Stan Ockers)
2nd Six Days of Brussels (with Stan Ockers)
3rd Six Days of Antwerp (with Stan Ockers)
1955
National Track Championships

1st Omnium
1st Madison
2nd Men's sprint

1st Six Days of Antwerp (with Stan Ockers)
1st Six Days of Brussels (with Emile Severeyns)
1st Six Days of Ghent (with Emile Severeyns)
1st Madison in Amsterdam, Bayonne, Brussels (x2), Copenhagen (x2), Dortmund, Frankfurt, Ghent, Ostend, Marcinelle, Rocourt (x2), Saint-Omer, Zwartberg
1st Derny in Antwerp
1st Omnium in Antwerp (x4), Brussels (x5), Copenhagen, Grenoble, Le Havre, Padua, Rocourt
1st Pursuit in Brussels
1st Sprint in Antwerp
3rd Six Days of Ghent (with Stan Ockers)
3rd Six Days of Berlin (with Sydney Patterson)
1956
1st Six Days of Brussels (with Emile Severeyns)
1st Six Days of Dortmund (with Emile Severeyns)
1st Madison in Brussels (x2), Copenhagen (x2), Dortmund, Frankfurt, Ghent, Lisbon, Ostend, Tortosa, Zürich
1st Derny in Antwerp, Brussels, Milan, Rocourt
1st Omnium in Brussels, Ghent, Le Havre, Ostend, Milan, Rocourt
1st Pursuit in Zürich
1st Sprint in Antwerp
2nd Six Days of Ghent (with Emile Severeyns)
2nd Six Days of Antwerp (with Emile Severeyns and Arsène Rijckaert)
1957
1st Six Days of Berlin (with Emile Severeyns)
1st Six Days of Ghent (with Fred De Bruyne)
1st Madison in Antwerp, Copenhagen (x3), Ghent, Lurcy-Levis. Paris
1st Derny in Antwerp (x4), Brussels (x2)
1st Omnium in Antwerp (x3), Brussels (x5), Cologne, La Rochelle, Paris, Zürich
1st Sprint in Élisabethville, Ghent, Roubaix
2nd Six Days of Dortmund (with Emile Severeyns)
2nd Six Days of Zürich (with Emile Severeyns)
3rd European Track Championships – Omnium
3rd Six Days of Antwerp (with Emile Severeyns and Willy Vannitsen)
3rd Six Days of Brussels (with Emile Severeyns)
1958
1st European Track Championships – Madison (with Emile Severeyns)
1st Six Days of Antwerp (with Emile Severeyns and Reginald Arnold)
1st Six Days of Brussels (with Emile Severeyns)
1st Six Days of Copenhagen (with Emile Severeyns)
1st Six Days of Frankfurt (with Emile Severeyns)
1st Prix Hourlier-Comès (with Emile Severeyns)
1st Madison in Antwerp, Berlin, Blaton, Bordeaux, Copenhagen (x3), Fougères, Ghent, Paris, Zürich
1st Derny in Antwerp (x2), Ghent (x2)
1st Omnium in Antwerp (x3), Brussels (x5), Ghent (x2), Paris (x2)
1st Pursuit in Antwerp
1st Sprint in Antwerp
2nd National Track Championships – Men's sprint
2nd Six Days of Berlin (with Emile Severeyns)
2nd Six Days of Ghent (with Emile Severeyns)
2nd Six Days of Zürich (with Emile Severeyns)
2nd Prix du Salon (with Emile Severeyns)
1959
European Track Championships

1st Madison (with Emile Severeyns)
1st Omnium

1st Six Days of Dortmund (with Klaus Bugdahl)
1st Six Days of Ghent (with Fred De Bruyne)
1st Six Days of Zürich (with Emile Severeyns)
1st Madison in Aarhus, Berlin, Copenhagen (x3), Zürich
1st Derny in Antwerp (x5), Bâle, Brussels, Ghent (x2), Paris
1st Omnium in Aarhus, Berlin, Brussels (x3), Copenhagen (x2), Ghent (x4), Paris (x2)
1st Pursuit in Paris
1st Sprint in Brussels (x2)
2nd Six Days of Brussels (with Emile Severeyns)
2nd Six Days of Berlin (with Emile Severeyns)
2nd Six Days of Copenhagen (with Emile Severeyns)
2nd Six Days of Frankfurt (with Emile Severeyns)
3rd Six Days of Antwerp (with Emile Severeyns)
3rd Six Days of Cologne (with Heinz Vöpel)
1960
European Track Championships

1st Madison (with Emile Severeyns)
1st Omnium

1st Six Days of Aarhus (with Emile Severeyns)
1st Six Days of Brussels (with Emile Severeyns)
1st Six Days of Copenhagen (with Emile Severeyns)
1st Madison in Antwerp, Bâle, Brussels (x2), Copenhagen (x3), Ghent, Madrid, Zürich (x2)
1st Derny in Antwerp, Brussels (x4), Cologne, Ghent, Zürich
1st Omnium in Antwerp (x3), Alger, Brussels (x6), Dortmund, Ghent (x3), Paris, Rocourt
1st Pursuit in Antwerp
1st Sprint in Nantes
2nd Six Days of Ghent (with Emile Severeyns)
2nd Six Days of Cologne (with Günther Ziegler)
2nd Six Days of Antwerp (with Emile Severeyns and Leo Proost)
1961
European Track Championships

1st Madison (with Emile Severeyns)
3rd Omnium

National Track Championships

1st Omnium
1st Madison (with Emile Severeyns)
1st Derny

1st Six Days of Dortmund (with Emile Severeyns)
1st Six Days of Zürich (with Emile Severeyns)
1st Six Days of Berlin (with Klaus Bugdahl)
1st Madison in Bâle, Berlin, Brussels, Cologne (x3), Dortmund, Ghent (x2), Saintes, Saint-Quentin
1st Omnium in Antwerp (x4), Berlin (x2), Brussels (x2) Ghent
1st Omnium in Antwerp (x3), Brussels (x7), Copenhagen, Ghent (x4), Paris, Rocourt
1st Pursuit in Brussels
1st Sprint in Antwerp, Brussels (2)
2nd Six Days of Cologne (with Emile Severeyns)
2nd Six Days of Brussels (with Emile Severeyns)
2nd Six Days of Antwerp (with Emile Severeyns and Gilbert Maes)
2nd Six Days of Ghent (with Emile Severeyns)
3rd Six Days of Aarhus (with Emile Severeyns)
3rd Six Days of Frankfurt (with Emile Severeyns)
3rd Six Days of Berlin (with Emile Severeyns)
1962
European Track Championships

2nd Omnium
3rd Madison (with Emile Severeyns)

1st National Track Championships – Derny
1st Six Days of Brussels (with Palle Lykke)
1st Six Days of Madrid (with Emile Severeyns)
1st Six Days of Cologne (with Emile Severeyns)
1st Madison in Bâle, Berlin, Cologne, Milan
1st Derny in Antwerp (x4), Berlin (x4)
1st Omnium in Antwerp (x2), Brussels (x4), Fresnes, Ghent (x3), Rocourt, Zürich
1st Pursuit in Cologne
1st Sprint in Antwerp, Brussels, Pont-Aven, Zürich
2nd Six Days of Antwerp (with Emile Severeyns and Palle Lykke)
2nd Six Days of Münster (with Emile Severeyns)
2nd Six Days of Berlin-a (with Emile Severeyns)
2nd Six Days of Berlin-b (with Emile Severeyns)
2nd Six Days of Essen (with Emile Severeyns)
1963
European Track Championships

1st Madison (with Palle Lykke)
2nd Derny
3rd Omnium

National Track Championships

1st Omnium
1st Derny

1st Six Days of Antwerp (with Palle Lykke) and Leo Proost)
1st Six Days of Frankfurt (with Palle Lykke)
1st Six Days of Madrid (with Joseph De Bakker)
1st Madison in Milan, Zürich
1st Derny in Bâle, Brussels
1st Omnium in Antwerp (x2), Brussels, Copenhagen, Madrid, Netherlands, Rocourt, Valentigney, Vincennes
1st Sprint in Antwerp (x2), Brussels
2nd Six Days of Essen (with Peter Post)
2nd Six Days of Berlin (with Rik Van Looy)
2nd Six Days of Brussels (with Palle Lykke)
3rd Six Days of Cologne (with Palle Lykke)
3rd Six Days of Dortmund (with Palle Lykke)
3rd Six Days of Milan (with Emile Severeyns)
3rd Six Days of Zürich (with Rik Van Looy))
1964
National Track Championships

1st Derny

European Track Championships

2nd Derny

1st Six Days of Milan (with Leandro Faggin)
1st Six Days of Madrid (with Federico Bahamontes)
1st Madison in Antwerp (x2), Brussels (x2), Cologne, Dortmund, Milan (x3), Ostend, Zürich
1st Derny in Antwerp, Berlin, Cologne (x2)
1st Omnium in Antwerp (x3), Brussels (x2), Dortmund, Madrid, Ostend, Paris, Rocourt
1st Sprint in Antwerp (x2)
2nd Six Days of Brussels (with Palle Lykke)
2nd Six Days of Cologne (with Palle Lykke)
2nd Six Days of Zürich (with Emile Severeyns)
2nd Six Days of Antwerp (with Palle Lykke) and Leo Proost)
3rd Six Days of Essen (with Palle Lykke)
1965
1st Six Days of Bremen (with Leandro Faggin)
1st Six Days of Milan (with Gianni Motta)
1st Six Days of Essen (with Peter Post)
1st Six Days of Toronto (with Emile Severeyns)
1st Six Days of Quebec (with Emile Severeyns)
1st Six Days of Madrid (with Romain De Loof)
1st Madison in Antwerp, Luçon, Niederborn, Saint-Quentin, Netherlands GP, Ostend
1st Derny in Antwerp, Netherlands GP
1st Omnium in Brussels (x2), Colmar, Ghent, Roubaix
1st Sprint in Antwerp, Ghent (x2)
European Track Championships

2nd Madison (with Palle Lykke)

2nd Six Days of Antwerp (with Palle Lykke) and Freddy Eugen)
2nd Six Days of Brussels (with Palle Lykke)
2nd Six Days of Ghent (with Emile Severeyns)
1966
1st Derny in Antwerp
1st Omnium in Antwerp
European Track Championships

2nd Madison (with Palle Lykke)
2nd Omnium

National Track Championships

2nd Omnium

2nd Six Days of Cologne (with Peter Post)
