= Belgium at the UCI Road World Championships =

- IOC code: BEL
- Medals: Gold 47 Silver 40 Bronze 38 Total 125

Belgium at the UCI Road World Championships is an overview of the Belgian results at the UCI Road World Championships. The Belgian competitors are selected by coaches of the Royal Belgian Cycling League. Apart from cycling events at the four-yearly Summer Olympics, the only times that road cyclists appear in proper national selections (instead of in commercial cycling teams) of one or multiple athletes are the yearly UCI Road World Championships. Because of this, all Belgian national road cycling teams (either elite, amateur or younger teams) only compete as such during one day per year. Belgium first sent athletes to the World Championships in the early 1920s when only amateur cyclists competed. The nation's first medal, a gold, was earned by Henri Hoevenaers in the men's amateur road race in 1925.

== List of medalists ==
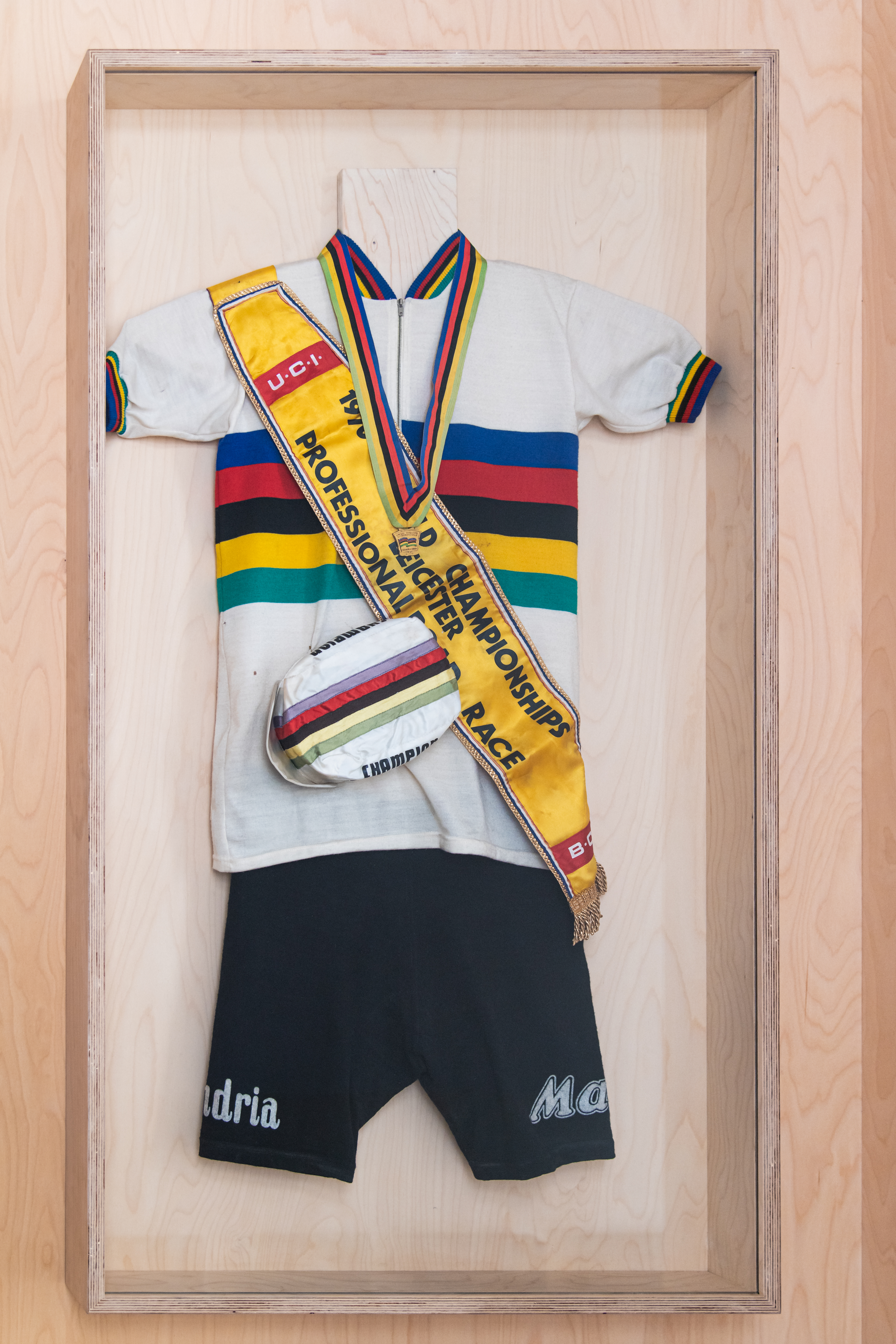
Outfit of Jean-Pierre Monseré as worldchampion (1970), consisting of victory ribbon, cap, medal and rainbow jersey (collection KOERS. Museum of Cycle Racing)

This is a list of all Belgian medals (including elite, amateur, under-23 and junior races). Since the 2012 UCI Road World Championships there is the men's and women's team time trial event for trade teams and these medals are included under the UCI registration country of the team. Note that in these events also foreign cyclists can belong to the "national" team.

Medal	Championship	Name	Event
Gold	(Netherlands) 1925 Apeldoorn	Henri Hoevenaers	Men's amateur road race
Gold	(Germany) 1927 Nürburgring	Jean Aerts	Men's amateur road race
Gold	(Hungary) 1928 Budapest	Georges Ronsse	Men's road race
Bronze	(Hungary) 1928 Budapest	Jean Aerts	Men's amateur road race
Gold	(Switzerland) 1929 Zürich	Georges Ronsse	Men's road race
Bronze	(Belgium) 1930 Liège	Georges Ronsse	Men's road race
Bronze	(France) 1933 Montlhéry	Joseph Lowagie	Men's amateur road race
Gold	(Germany) 1934 Leipzig	Karel Kaers	Men's road race
Bronze	(Germany) 1934 Leipzig	Gustave Danneels	Men's road race
Bronze	(Germany) 1934 Leipzig	Paul André	Men's amateur road race
Gold	(Belgium) 1935 Floreffe	Jean Aerts	Men's road race
Bronze	(Belgium) 1935 Floreffe	Gustave Danneels	Men's road race
Gold	(Denmark) 1937 Copenhagen	Éloi Meulenberg	Men's road race
Gold	(Netherlands) 1938 Valkenburg	Marcel Kint	Men's road race
Silver	(Switzerland) 1946 Zürich	Marcel Kint	Men's road race
Bronze	(Switzerland) 1946 Zürich	Rik Van Steenbergen	Men's road race
Bronze	(Switzerland) 1946 Zürich	Henri van Kerkhoven	Men's amateur road race
Silver	(France) 1947 Reims	Albert Sercu	Men's road race
Gold	(Netherlands) 1948 Valkenburg	Briek Schotte	Men's road race
Silver	(Netherlands) 1948 Valkenburg	Liévin Lerno	Men's amateur road race
Gold	(Denmark) 1949 Copenhagen	Rik Van Steenbergen	Men's road race
Gold	(Belgium) 1950 Moorslede	Briek Schotte	Men's road race
Silver	1952 Luxembourg	André Noyelle	Men's amateur road race
Silver	(Switzerland) 1953 Lugano	Germain Derijcke	Men's road race
Bronze	(Switzerland) 1953 Lugano	Stan Ockers	Men's road race
Bronze	(Switzerland) 1953 Lugano	Rik Van Looy	Men's amateur road race
Gold	(Germany) 1954 Solingen	Emiel van Cauter	Men's amateur road race
Gold	(Italy) 1955 Frascati	Stan Ockers	Men's road race
Bronze	(Italy) 1955 Frascati	Germain Derijcke	Men's road race
Gold	(Denmark) 1956 Copenhagen	Rik Van Steenbergen	Men's road race
Silver	(Denmark) 1956 Copenhagen	Rik Van Looy	Men's road race
Silver	(Denmark) 1956 Copenhagen	Norbert Veroughstraete	Men's amateur road race
Gold	(Belgium) 1957 Waregem	Rik Van Steenbergen	Men's road race
Gold	(Belgium) 1957 Waregem	Louis Proost	Men's amateur road race
Silver	(France) 1958 Reims	Valere Paulissen	Men's amateur road race
Bronze	(France) 1958 Reims	Henri Dewolf	Men's amateur road race
Gold	(Netherlands) 1959 Zandvoort	Yvonne Reynders	Women's road race
Bronze	(Netherlands) 1959 Zandvoort	Noel Fore	Men's road race
Bronze	(Netherlands) 1959 Zandvoort	Constant Goossens	Men's amateur road race
Gold	(East Germany) 1960 Leipzig	Rik Van Looy	Men's road race
Silver	(East Germany) 1960 Leipzig	Rosa Sels	Women's road race
Bronze	(East Germany) 1960 Leipzig	Pino Cerami	Men's road race
Bronze	(East Germany) 1960 Leipzig	Willy Vanden Berghen	Men's amateur road race
Gold	(Switzerland) 1961 Bern	Rik Van Looy	Men's road race
Gold	(Switzerland) 1961 Bern	Yvonne Reynders	Women's road race
Gold	(Italy) 1962 Salò	Marie-Rose Gaillard	Women's road race
Silver	(Italy) 1962 Salò	Yvonne Reynders	Women's road race
Bronze	(Italy) 1962 Salò	Jos Hoevenaars	Men's road race
Bronze	(Italy) 1962 Salò	Marie-Thérèse Naessens	Women's road race
Gold	(Belgium) 1963 Renaix	Benoni Beheyt	Men's road race
Gold	(Belgium) 1963 Renaix	Yvonne Reynders	Women's road race
Silver	(Belgium) 1963 Renaix	Rik Van Looy	Men's road race
Silver	(Belgium) 1963 Renaix	Rosa Sels	Women's road race
Gold	(France) 1964 Sallanches	Eddy Merckx	Men's amateur road race
Silver	(France) 1964 Sallanches	Willy Planckaert	Men's amateur road race
Bronze	(France) 1964 Sallanches	Belgium	Men's 100km team mountains race
Bronze	(France) 1964 Sallanches	Rosa Sels	Women's road race
Silver	(Spain) 1965 Lasarte-Oria	Yvonne Reynders	Women's road race
Bronze	(Spain) 1965 Lasarte-Oria	Roger Swerts	Men's road race
Gold	(Germany) 1966 Nürburgring	Yvonne Reynders	Women's road race
Gold	(Netherlands) 1967 Heerlen	Eddy Merckx	Men's road race
Silver	(Italy) 1968 Imola	Herman Van Springel	Men's road race
Silver	(Belgium) 1969 Zolder	Julien Stevens	Men's road race
Silver	(Belgium) 1969 Zolder	Jean-Pierre Monseré	Men's amateur road race
Bronze	(Belgium) 1969 Zolder	Gustave Van Roosbroeck	Men's amateur road race
Gold	(United Kingdom) 1970 Leicester	Jean-Pierre Monseré	Men's road race
Silver	(United Kingdom) 1970 Leicester	Ludo Van der Linden	Men's amateur road race
Bronze	(United Kingdom) 1970 Leicester	Tony Gakens	Men's amateur road race
Gold	(Switzerland) 1971 Mendrisio	Eddy Merckx	Men's road race
Gold	(Switzerland) 1971 Mendrisio	Belgium	Men's team time trial
Silver	(Switzerland) 1971 Mendrisio	Freddy Maertens	Men's amateur road race
Gold	(Spain) 1973 Barcelona	Nicole Vandenbroeck	Women's road race
Silver	(Spain) 1973 Barcelona	Freddy Maertens	Men's road race
Gold	(Canada) 1974 Montreal	Eddy Merckx	Men's road race
Silver	(Belgium) 1975 Mettet and Yvoir	Roger De Vlaeminck	Men's road race
Gold	(Italy) 1976 Ostuni	Freddy Maertens	Men's road race
Bronze	(Italy) 1976 Ostuni	Yvonne Reynders	Women's road race
Silver	(Netherlands) 1979 Valkenburg	Jen De Smet	Women's road race
Gold	(Czechoslovakia) 1981 Prague	Freddy Maertens	Men's road race
Silver	(Czechoslovakia) 1981 Prague	Rudy Rogiers	Men's amateur road race
Silver	(United Kingdom) 1982 Goodwood	Francis Vermaelen	Men's amateur road race
Bronze	(United Kingdom) 1982 Goodwood	Gerda Sierens	Women's road race
Gold	(Spain) 1984 Barcelona	Claude Criquielion	Men's road race
Bronze	(Italy) 1985 Giavera del Montello	Franck Van De Vijver	Men's amateur road race
Gold	(Japan) 1990 Utsunomiya	Rudy Dhaenens	Men's road race
Silver	(Japan) 1990 Utsunomiya	Dirk De Wolf	Men's road race
Silver	(Italy) 1994 Agrigento	Patsy Maegerman	Women's road race
Gold	(Switzerland) 1996 Lugano	Johan Museeuw	Men's road race
Silver	(Netherlands) 1998 Valkenburg	Peter van Petegem	Men's road race
Gold	(Portugal) 2001 Lisbon	Jurgen van den Broeck	Men's junior time trial
Silver	(Canada) 2003 Hamilton	Johan Van Summeren	Men's under-23 road race
Bronze	(Canada) 2003 Hamilton	Peter van Petegem	Men's road race
Gold	(Spain) 2005 Madrid	Tom Boonen	Men's road race
Gold	(Austria) 2006 Salzburg	Dominique Cornu	Men's under-23 time trial
Silver	(Denmark) 2011 Copenhagen	Martijn Degreve	Men's junior road race
Silver	(Denmark) 2011 Copenhagen	Jessy Druyts	Women's junior road race
Gold	(Netherlands) 2012 Valkenburg	Philippe Gilbert	Men's road race
Gold	(Netherlands) 2012 Valkenburg	Omega Pharma–Quick-Step; Tom Boonen; Sylvain Chavanel (FRA); Tony Martin (GER); Niki Terpstra (NED); Kristof Vandewalle; Peter Velits (SVK)	Men's team time trial
Bronze	(Netherlands) 2012 Valkenburg	Tom Van Asbroeck	Men's under-23 road race
Gold	(Italy) 2013 Tuscany	Omega Pharma–Quick-Step; Sylvain Chavanel (FRA); Michał Kwiatkowski (POL); Tony Martin (GER); Niki Terpstra (NED); Kristof Vandewalle; Peter Velits (SVK)	Men's team time trial
Gold	(Italy) 2013 Tuscany	Igor Decraene	Men's junior time trial
Bronze	(Spain) 2014 Ponferrada	Omega Pharma–Quick-Step; Tom Boonen; Michał Kwiatkowski (POL); Tony Martin (GER); Pieter Serry; Niki Terpstra (NED); Julien Vermote	Men's team time trial
Silver	(United States) 2015 Richmond	Etixx–Quick-Step; Tom Boonen; Michał Kwiatkowski (POL); Yves Lampaert; Tony Martin (GER); Niki Terpstra (NED); Rigoberto Urán (COL)	Men's team time trial
Gold	2016 Qatar	Etixx–Quick-Step; Bob Jungels (LUX); Marcel Kittel (GER); Yves Lampaert; Tony Martin (GER); Niki Terpstra (NED); Julien Vermote	Men's team time trial
Bronze	2016 Qatar	Tom Boonen	Men's road race
Silver	(United Kingdom) 2019 Yorkshire	Remco Evenepoel	Men's time trial
Silver	(Italy) 2020 Imola	Wout van Aert	Men's time trial
Silver	(Italy) 2020 Imola	Wout van Aert	Men's road race
Silver	(Belgium) 2021 Flanders	Wout van Aert	Men's time trial
Bronze	(Belgium) 2021 Flanders	Remco Evenepoel	Men's time trial
Bronze	(Belgium) 2021 Flanders	Florian Vermeersch	Men's under-23 time trial
Bronze	(Belgium) 2021 Flanders	Alec Segaert	Men's junior time trial
Gold	(Australia) 2022 Wollongong	Remco Evenepoel	Men's road race
Bronze	(Australia) 2022 Wollongong	Remco Evenepoel	Men's time trial
Silver	(Australia) 2022 Wollongong	Lotte Kopecky	Women's road race
Silver	(Australia) 2022 Wollongong	Alec Segaert	Men's under-23 time trial
Bronze	(Australia) 2022 Wollongong	Vlad Van Mechelen	Men's junior road race
Bronze	(Australia) 2022 Wollongong	Febe Jooris	Women's junior time trial
Gold	(United Kingdom) 2023 Glasgow	Remco Evenepoel	Men's time trial
Gold	(United Kingdom) 2023 Glasgow	Lotte Kopecky	Women's road race
Silver	(United Kingdom) 2023 Glasgow	Wout Van Aert	Men's road race
Silver	(United Kingdom) 2023 Glasgow	Alec Segaert	Men's under-23 time trial
Bronze	(United Kingdom) 2023 Glasgow	Julie De Wilde	Women's under-23 time trial
Bronze	(United Kingdom) 2023 Glasgow	Fleur Moors	Women's junior road race

=== Medals by discipline ===
Updated after the 2023 UCI Road World Championships on 13 August

Event	Gold	Silver	Bronze	Total	Rank
Men's (professional) road race	27	13	12	52	
Men's amateur road race	5	10	11	26	
Men's time trial	1	3	2	6	
Men's team time trial	4	1	1	6	
100 km mountains race	0	0	1	1	
Women's road race	7	7	4	18	
Women's time trial	0	0	0	0	
Women's team time trial	0	1	0	1	
Men's under-23 road race	0	1	1	2	
Men's under-23 time trial	1	2	1	4	
Women's under-23 road race	0	0	0	0	
Women's under-23 time trial	0	0	1	1	
Men's junior road race	0	1	1	2	
Men's junior time trial	2	0	1	3	
Women's junior road race	0	1	2	3	
Total	47	40	38	125	
