= Ardennes classics =

Cycling classics in Belgium and the Netherlands

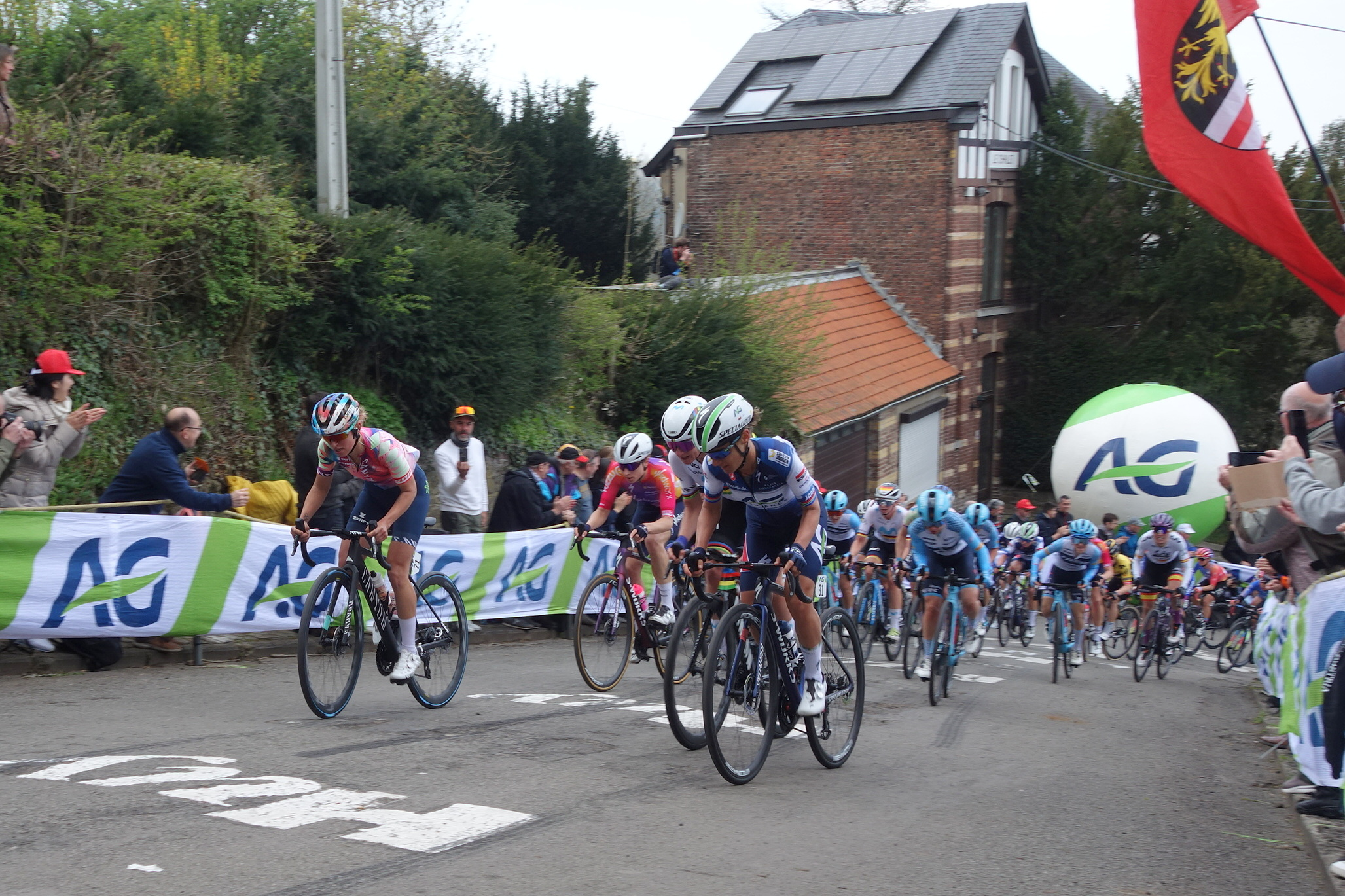
Riders climbing the Mur de Huy during the 2023 La Flèche Wallonne Féminine

The Ardennes classics are three cycling classics held in mid-April in the Belgian Ardennes and southern Limburg in the Netherlands: Liège–Bastogne–Liège, La Flèche Wallonne and Amstel Gold Race. First held in 1892, 1936 and 1966 respectively, the races are notable for their hilly courses, and often have similar riders competing for the top positions as the races are held closely following each other. Cyclists that are specialized in these hilly courses are known as puncheurs. In recent years, the three classics have been held within an 8-day timeframe.

Since the late 2010s, all three of the men's races have been joined by equivalent races on the women's circuit: Amstel Gold Race, La Flèche Wallonne Femmes and Liège–Bastogne–Liège Femmes.

== History ==
Prior, there was already a points classification for the Belgian Ardennes classics, called Ardennes Weekend (combining La Flèche Wallonne and Liège–Bastogne–Liège).

With the introduction of the Amstel Gold Race, originally between both races, the period between the Belgian classics was extended to a week and a half. Since then, the original points classification became unofficial.

The only male winners of the "triple" are Davide Rebellin in 2004 and Philippe Gilbert in 2011. Gilbert also won the Brabantse Pijl, another important hill classic in mid-April, winning the "quadruple" that year. Other riders to win all three races, though not in a single year, are Danilo Di Luca, Michele Bartoli, Eddy Merckx, Bernard Hinault and Tadej Pogačar.

In 2017, women's races for all three of the Ardennes classics were held for the first time, with Liège–Bastogne–Liège Femmes making its debut alongside a revival of the Women's Amstel Gold Race, which had previously been held from 2001 to 2003, and La Flèche Wallonne Femmes, which has been held since 1998. Anna van der Breggen immediately clinched the triple by winning all three races in 2017, being followed by team-mate Lizzie Deignan in second and Katarzyna Niewiadoma in third in all three events.

There is no official competition connecting the three races, although there have been classifications in the past for the two Walloon races.

In recent years, these three hill classics are held in the second half of April, following a similar set of the Cobbled classics.

Later in the year, there are two similar 'trebles' in Italy: the Trittico Lombardo with the Tre Valli Varesine, Coppa Ugo Agostoni and Coppa Bernocchi in the Lombardy Region, and the Trittico di Autunno (Autumn Triptych) with Milano–Torino, Giro del Piemonte and Giro di Lombardia.

== Winners ==
=== Men's (since 1966) ===
Year	Amstel Gold Race	La Flèche Wallonne	Liège–Bastogne–Liège
1966	Jean Stablinski (FRA)	Michele Dancelli (ITA)	Jacques Anquetil (FRA)
1967	Arie den Hartog (NED)	Eddy Merckx (BEL) (1/10)	Walter Godefroot (BEL)
1968	Harry Steevens (NED)	Rik Van Looy (BEL)	Valere Van Sweevelt (BEL)
1969	Guido Reybrouck (BEL)	Jos Huysmans (BEL)	Eddy Merckx (BEL) (2/10)
1970	Georges Pintens (BEL) (1/2)	Eddy Merckx (BEL) (3/10)	Roger De Vlaeminck (BEL) (1/2)
1971	Frans Verbeeck (BEL) (1/2)	Roger De Vlaeminck (BEL) (2/2)	Eddy Merckx (BEL) (4/10)
1972	Walter Planckaert (BEL)	Eddy Merckx (BEL) (5/10)	Eddy Merckx (BEL) (6/10)
1973	Eddy Merckx (BEL) (7/10)	André Dierickx (BEL)	Eddy Merckx (BEL) (8/10)
1974	Gerrie Knetemann (NED)	Frans Verbeeck (BEL) (2/2)	Georges Pintens (BEL) (2/2)
1975	Eddy Merckx (BEL) (9/10)	André Dierickx (BEL)	Eddy Merckx (BEL) (10/10)
1976	Freddy Maertens (BEL)	Joop Zoetemelk (NED) (1/2)	Joseph Bruyère (BEL) (1/2)
1977	Jan Raas (NED) (1/5)	Francesco Moser (ITA)	Bernard Hinault (FRA) (1/5)
1978	Jan Raas (NED) (2/5)	Michel Laurent (FRA)	Joseph Bruyère (BEL) (2/2)
1979	Jan Raas (NED) (3/5)	Bernard Hinault (FRA) (2/5)	Dietrich Thurau (DEU)
1980	Jan Raas (NED) (4/5)	Giuseppe Saronni (ITA)	Bernard Hinault (FRA) (3/5)
1981	Bernard Hinault (FRA) (4/5)	Daniel Willems (BEL)	Josef Fuchs (SUI)
1982	Jan Raas (NED) (5/5)	Mario Beccia (ITA)	Silvano Contini (ITA)
1983	Phil Anderson (AUS)	Bernard Hinault (FRA) (5/5)	Steven Rooks (NED) (1/2)
1984	Jacques Hanegraaf (NED)	Kim Andersen (DEN)	Sean Kelly (IRE) (1/2)
1985	Gerrie Knetemann (NED)	Claude Criquielion (BEL)	Moreno Argentin (ITA) (1/7)
1986	Steven Rooks (NED) (2/2)	Laurent Fignon (FRA)	Moreno Argentin (ITA) (2/7)
1987	Joop Zoetemelk (NED) (2/2)	Jean-Claude Leclercq (FRA)	Moreno Argentin (ITA) (3/7)
1988	Jelle Nijdam (NED)	Rolf Gölz (DEU)	Adri van der Poel (NED)
1989	Eric Van Lancker (BEL) (1/2)	Claude Criquielion (BEL)	Sean Kelly (IRE) (2/2)
1990	Adri van der Poel (NED)	Moreno Argentin (ITA) (4/7)	Eric van Lancker (BEL) (2/2)
1991	Frans Maassen (NED)	Moreno Argentin (ITA) (5/7)	Moreno Argentin (ITA) (6/7)
1992	Olaf Ludwig (GER)	Giorgio Furlan (ITA)	Dirk de Wolf (BEL)
1993	Rolf Järmann (SUI) (1/2)	Maurizio Fondriest (ITA)	Rolf Sørensen (DEN)
1994	Johan Museeuw (BEL)	Moreno Argentin (ITA) (7/7)	Evgeni Berzin (RUS)
1995	Mauro Gianetti (SUI)	Laurent Jalabert (FRA) (1/2)	Mauro Gianetti (SUI)
1996	Stefano Zanini (ITA)	Lance Armstrong (USA)	Pascal Richard (SUI)
1997	Bjarne Riis (DEN)	Laurent Jalabert (FRA) (2/2)	Michele Bartoli (ITA) (1/4)
1998	Rolf Järmann (SUI) (2/2)	Bo Hamburger (DEN)	Michele Bartoli (ITA) (2/4)
1999	Michael Boogerd (NED)	Michele Bartoli (ITA) (3/4)	Frank Vandenbroucke (BEL)
2000	Erik Zabel (GER)	Francesco Casagrande (ITA)	Paolo Bettini (ITA) (1/2)
2001	Erik Dekker (NED)	Rik Verbrugghe (BEL)	Oscar Camenzind (SUI)
2002	Michele Bartoli (ITA) (4/4)	Mario Aerts (BEL)	Paolo Bettini (ITA) (2/2)
2003	Alexander Vinokourov (KAZ) (1/3)	Igor Astarloa (ESP)	Tyler Hamilton (USA)
2004	Davide Rebellin (ITA) (1/5)	Davide Rebellin (ITA) (2/5)	Davide Rebellin (ITA) (3/5)
2005	Danilo Di Luca (ITA) (1/3)	Danilo Di Luca (ITA) (2/3)	Alexander Vinokourov (KAZ) (2/3)
2006	Fränk Schleck (LUX)	Alejandro Valverde (ESP) (1/9)	Alejandro Valverde (ESP) (2/9)
2007	Stefan Schumacher (GER)	Davide Rebellin (ITA) (4/5)	Danilo Di Luca (ITA) (3/3)
2008	Damiano Cunego (ITA)	Kim Kirchen (LUX)	Alejandro Valverde (ESP) (3/9)
2009	Sergei Ivanov (RUS)	Davide Rebellin (ITA) (5/5)	Andy Schleck (LUX)
2010	Philippe Gilbert (BEL) (1/6)	Cadel Evans (AUS)	Alexander Vinokourov (KAZ) (3/3)
2011	Philippe Gilbert (BEL) (2/6)	Philippe Gilbert (BEL) (3/6)	Philippe Gilbert (BEL) (4/6)
2012	Enrico Gasparotto (ITA) (1/2)	Joaquim Rodríguez (ESP)	Maxim Iglinsky (KAZ)
2013	Roman Kreuziger (CZE)	Daniel Moreno (ESP)	Dan Martin (IRL)
2014	Philippe Gilbert (BEL) (5/6)	Alejandro Valverde (ESP) (4/9)	Simon Gerrans (AUS)
2015	Michał Kwiatkowski (POL) (1/2)	Alejandro Valverde (ESP) (5/9)	Alejandro Valverde (ESP) (6/9)
2016	Enrico Gasparotto (ITA) (2/2)	Alejandro Valverde (ESP) (7/9)	Wout Poels (NED)
2017	Philippe Gilbert (BEL) (6/6)	Alejandro Valverde (ESP) (8/9)	Alejandro Valverde (ESP) (9/9)
2018	Michael Valgren (DEN)	Julian Alaphilippe (FRA) (1/3)	Bob Jungels (LUX)
2019	Mathieu van der Poel (NED)	Julian Alaphilippe (FRA) (2/3)	Jakob Fuglsang (DEN)
2020	Cancelled due to COVID-19 pandemic	Marc Hirschi (SUI)	Primož Roglič (SLO)
2021	Wout Van Aert (BEL)	Julian Alaphilippe (FRA) (3/3)	Tadej Pogačar (SLO) (1/7)
2022	Michał Kwiatkowski (POL) (2/2)	Dylan Teuns (BEL)	Remco Evenepoel (BEL) (1/3)
2023	Tadej Pogačar (SLO) (2/7)	Tadej Pogačar (SLO) (3/7)	Remco Evenepoel (BEL) (2/3)
2024	Tom Pidcock (GBR)	Stephen Williams (GBR)	Tadej Pogačar (SLO) (4/7)
2025	Mattias Skjelmose (DEN)	Tadej Pogačar (SLO) (5/7)	Tadej Pogačar (SLO) (6/7)
2026	Remco Evenepoel (BEL) (3/3)	Paul Seixas (FRA)	Tadej Pogačar (SLO) (7/7)
Year	Amstel Gold Race	La Flèche Wallonne	Liège–Bastogne–Liège

=== Women's ===
Year	Amstel Gold Race	La Flèche Wallonne Femmes	Liège–Bastogne–Liège Femmes
1998	Race not held	Fabiana Luperini (ITA) (1/3)	Race not held
1999	Race not held	Hanka Kupfernagel (GER)	Race not held
2000	Race not held	Geneviève Jeanson (CAN)	Race not held
2001	Debby Mansveld (NED)	Fabiana Luperini (ITA) (2/3)	Race not held
2002	Leontien van Moorsel (NED)	Fabiana Luperini (ITA) (3/3)	Race not held
2003	Nicole Cooke (GBR) (1/4)	Nicole Cooke (GBR) (2/4)	Race not held
2004	Race not held	Sonia Huguet (FRA)	Race not held
2005	Race not held	Nicole Cooke (GBR) (3/4)	Race not held
2006	Race not held	Nicole Cooke (GBR) (4/4)	Race not held
2007	Race not held	Marianne Vos (NED) (1/7)	Race not held
2008	Race not held	Marianne Vos (NED) (2/7)	Race not held
2009	Race not held	Marianne Vos (NED) (3/7)	Race not held
2010	Race not held	Emma Pooley (GBR)	Race not held
2011	Race not held	Marianne Vos (NED) (4/7)	Race not held
2012	Race not held	Evelyn Stevens (USA)	Race not held
2013	Race not held	Marianne Vos (NED) (5/7)	Race not held
2014	Race not held	Pauline Ferrand-Prévot (FRA)	Race not held
2015	Race not held	Anna van der Breggen (NED) (1/10)	Race not held
2016	Race not held	Anna van der Breggen (NED) (2/10)	Race not held
2017	Anna van der Breggen (NED) (3/10)	Anna van der Breggen (NED) (4/10)	Anna van der Breggen (NED) (5/10)
2018	Chantal Blaak (NED)	Anna van der Breggen (NED) (6/10)	Anna van der Breggen (NED) (7/10)
2019	Katarzyna Niewiadoma (POL) (1/2)	Anna van der Breggen (NED) (8/10)	Annemiek van Vleuten (NED) (1/2)
2020	Cancelled due to COVID-19 pandemic	Anna van der Breggen (NED) (9/10)	Lizzie Deignan (GBR)
2021	Marianne Vos (NED) (6/7)	Anna van der Breggen (NED) (10/10)	Demi Vollering (NED) (1/6)
2022	Marta Cavalli (ITA) (1/2)	Marta Cavalli (ITA) (2/2)	Annemiek van Vleuten (NED) (2/2)
2023	Demi Vollering (NED) (2/6)	Demi Vollering (NED) (3/6)	Demi Vollering (NED) (4/6)
2024	Marianne Vos (NED) (7/7)	Katarzyna Niewiadoma (POL) (2/2)	Grace Brown (AUS)
2025	Mischa Bredewold (NED)	Puck Pieterse (NED)	Kimberley Le Court (MUS)
2026	Paula Blasi (ESP)	Demi Vollering (NED) (5/6)	Demi Vollering (NED) (6/6)
Year	Amstel Gold Race	La Flèche Wallonne Femmes	Liège–Bastogne–Liège Femmes

== Most Ardennes classics wins ==
- Active cyclists marked in **bold**.

=== Men ===
Rank	Name	Total wins	Amstel Gold Race	La Flèche Wallonne	Liège–Bastogne–Liège
1	Eddy Merckx	**10**	2 (1973, 1975)	3 (1967, 1970, 1972)	**5** (1969, 1971, 1972, 1973, 1975)
2	Alejandro Valverde	9	0	**5** (2006, 2014, 2015, 2016, 2017)	4 (2006, 2008, 2015, 2017)
3	Moreno Argentin	7	0	3 (1990, 1991, 1994)	4 (1985, 1986, 1987, 1991)
3	**Tadej Pogačar**	7	1 (2023)	2 (2023, 2025)	4 (2021, 2024, 2025, 2026)
4	Philippe Gilbert	6	4 (2010, 2011, 2014, 2017)	1 (2011)	1 (2011)
6	Bernard Hinault	5	1 (1981)	2 (1979, 1983)	2 (1977, 1980)
6	Jan Raas	5	**5** (1977, 1978, 1979, 1980, 1982)	0	0
6	Davide Rebellin	5	1 (2004)	3 (2004, 2007, 2009)	1 (2004)
9	Ferdi Kübler	4	0	2 (1951, 1952)	2 (1951, 1952)
9	Michele Bartoli	4	1 (2002)	1 (1999)	2 (1997, 1998)
11	Marcel Kint	3	0	3 (1943, 1945, 1945)	0
11	Léon Houa	3	0	0	3 (1892, 1893, 1894)
11	Alfons Schepers	3	0	0	3 (1929, 1931, 1935)
11	Stan Ockers	3	0	2 (1953, 1955)	1 (1955)
11	Fred De Bruyne	3	0	0	3 (1956, 1958, 1959)
11	Alexander Vinokourov	3	1 (2003)	0	2 (2005, 2010)
11	Danilo Di Luca	3	1 (2005)	1 (2005)	1 (2007)
11	**Julian Alaphilippe**	3	0	3 (2018, 2019, 2021)	0
11	**Remco Evenepoel**	3	1 (2026)	0	2 (2022, 2023)

=== Women ===
Rank	Name	Total wins	Amstel Gold Race	La Flèche Wallonne Femmes	Liège–Bastogne–Liège
1	**Anna van der Breggen**	**10**	1 (2017)	**7** (2015, 2016, 2017, 2018, 2019, 2020, 2021)	**2** (2017, 2018)
2	**Marianne Vos**	7	2 (2021, 2024)	5 (2007, 2008, 2009, 2011, 2013)	0
3	**Demi Vollering**	6	1 (2023)	2 (2023, 2026)	3 (2021, 2023, 2026)
4	Nicole Cooke	4	1 (2003)	3 (2003, 2005, 2006)	0
5	Fabiana Luperini	3	0	3 (1998, 2001, 2002)	0
6	Annemiek van Vleuten	2	0	0	**2** (2019, 2022)
6	**Marta Cavalli**	2	1 (2022)	1 (2022)	0
6	**Katarzyna Niewiadoma**	2	1 (2019)	1 (2024)	0

== See also ==
- Cobbled classics
- Classic cycle races
