= 1942 La Flèche Wallonne =

Race details
- Dates: 19 July 1942
- Stages: 1
- Distance: 208 km (129.2 mi)
- Winning time: 5h 50' 00"

Results
	Winner	Karel Thijs (BEL)
	Second	Frans Bonduel (BEL)
	Third	Jacques Geus (BEL)

The 1942 La Flèche Wallonne was the sixth edition of La Flèche Wallonne cycle race and was held on 19 July 1942. The race started in Mons and finished in Marcinelle. The race was won by Karel Thijs.

== General classification ==
Final general classification

Rank	Rider	Time
1	Karel Thijs (BEL)	8h 43' 00"
2	Frans Bonduel (BEL)	+ 0"
3	Jacques Geus (BEL)	+ 0"
4	René Adriaenssens (BEL)	+ 0"
5	Albert Ritserveldt (BEL)	+ 0"
6	François Neuville (BEL)	+ 2' 00"
7	August Janssens (BEL)	+ 2' 15"
8	Joseph Moerenhout (BEL)	+ 2' 15"
9	Edward Van Dijck (BEL)	+ 3' 00"
10	Camille Muls (BEL)	+ 4' 00"
