= 1943 Tour of Flanders =

Race details
- Dates: April 19, 1943
- Stages: 1
- Distance: 215 km (133.6 mi)
- Winning time: 6h 07' 58"

Results
	Winner	Achiel Buysse (BEL)
	Second	Albert Sercu (BEL)
	Third	Camille Beeckman (BEL)

The 27th edition of the Tour of Flanders cycling classic race was held on Sunday, 19 April 1943. Belgian Achiel Buysse won the Monument for a third time. In total, 37 of 126 riders finished.

== Route ==
The race started in Ghent and finished there, in the Kuipke velodrome, totalling 215 km (133 miles).

The course featured 3 categorized climbs:

- Kwaremont
- Kruisberg
- Edelareberg

== Race Report ==
Achiel Buysse won in the sprint ahead of his two breakaway companions in Ghent, Albert Sercu and Camille Beeckman. Buysse completed the race with an average of 35,05 km/h.

== General classification ==
=== Final general classification ===
Rank	Rider	Team	Time
1	Achiel Buysse (BEL)	Dilecta–Wolber	6h 07' 08"
2	Albert Sercu (BEL)	Dilecta–Wolber	s.t.
3	Camille Beeckman (BEL)	Individual	s.t.
4	Sylvain Grysolle (BEL)	Dilecta–Wolber	25"
5	Marcel Kint (BEL)	Mercier–Hutchinson	01' 20"
6	Albert Beirnaert (BEL)	Individual	s.t.
7	Joseph Moerenhout (BEL)	Dilecta–Wolber	s.t.
8	Dolf Vandenbossche (BEL)	Individual	s.t.
9	Jan Van Steen (BEL)	Individual	s.t.
10	Eugène Kiewit (BEL)	Individual	s.t.
