= 1943 La Flèche Wallonne =

Race details
- Dates: 23 May 1943
- Stages: 1
- Distance: 208 km (129.2 mi)
- Winning time: 5h 40' 00"

Results
	Winner	Marcel Kint (BEL)
	Second	Georges Claes (BEL)
	Third	Désiré Keteleer (BEL)

The 1943 La Flèche Wallonne was the seventh edition of La Flèche Wallonne cycle race and was held on 23 May 1943. The race started in Mons and finished in Charleroi. The race was won by Marcel Kint.

== General classification ==
Final general classification

Rank	Rider	Time
1	Marcel Kint (BEL)	5h 40' 00"
2	Georges Claes (BEL)	+ 10"
3	Désiré Keteleer (BEL)	+ 10"
4	Armand Putzeys (BEL)	+ 10"
5	Ernest Sterckx (BEL)	+ 10"
6	Jacques Geus (BEL)	+ 10"
7	Jerome Dufromont (BEL)	+ 10"
8	Jules Lowie (BEL)	+ 10"
9	Omer Thys (BEL)	+ 10"
10	Joseph Moerenhout (BEL)	+ 10"
