= 1936 La Flèche Wallonne =

Race details
- Dates: 13 April 1936
- Stages: 1
- Distance: 236 km (146.6 mi)
- Winning time: 7h 04' 15"

Results
| | Winner | Philémon De Meersman (BEL) |
| | Second | Alphonse Verniers (BEL) |
| | Third | Camiel Michielsens (BEL) |

The 1936 La Flèche Wallonne was the inaugural edition of La Flèche Wallonne cycle race and was held on 13 April 1936. The race started in Tournai and finished in Liège. The race was won by Philémon De Meersman.

== General classification ==
Final general classification

| Rank | Rider | Time |
|---|---|---|
| 1 | Philémon De Meersman (BEL) | 7h 04' 15" |
| 2 | Alphonse Verniers (BEL) | + 0" |
| 3 | Camiel Michielsens (BEL) | + 23" |
| 4 | Albert Beckaert (BEL) | + 1' 06" |
| 5 | Richard Rottermans (BEL) | + 2' 12" |
| 6 | Armand Lambert (BEL) | + 2' 12" |
| 7 | Corneille Leemans (BEL) | + 2' 35" |
| 8 | Jérome France (BEL) | + 2' 35" |
| 9 | Antoine Dignef (BEL) | + 2' 35" |
| 10 | Éloi Meulenberg (BEL) | + 3' 08" |
