= 1944 Tour of Flanders =

Race details
- Dates: April 2, 1944
- Stages: 1
- Distance: 224 km (139.2 mi)
- Winning time: 6h 23' 30"

Results
	Winner	Rik van Steenbergen (BEL)
	Second	Briek Schotte (BEL)
	Third	Joseph Moerenhout (BEL)

The 28th running of the Tour of Flanders cycling classic was held on Sunday, 2 April 1944. Belgian Rik van Steenbergen finished as first. Aged 19, he still is the youngest cyclist ever to win this Monument. Of the 103 starting cyclists, 34 reached the finish

== Route ==
The race started in Ghent and finished there in the Kuipke velodrome, totaling 224 km (139 miles).

The course featured 3 categorized climbs:

- Kwaremont
- Kruisberg
- Edelareberg

== Race summary ==
75 km from the finish, a leading group of three formed. They held on until 10 km before the finish. Six riders joined. Due to confusion about the course in the velodrome, the leading rider, Georges Claes, fell. Rik Van Steenbergen cleverly avoided the fallen rider and could beat his fellow escapees in the sprint.

== General classification ==
=== Final general classification ===
Rank	Rider	Team	Time
1	Rik van Steenbergen (BEL)	Trialoux–Wolber	6h 23' 00"
2	Briek Schotte (BEL)	Helyett–Hutchinson	s.t.
3	Joseph Moerenhout (BEL)	Dilecta–Wolber	s.t.
4	Frans Sterckx (BEL)	Michard–Hutchinson	s.t.
5	Frans Bonduel (BEL)	Dilecta–Wolber	s.t.
6	Frans van Hellemont (BEL)	Individual	s.t.
7	Célestin Riga (BEL)	Dilecta–Wolber	s.t.
8	Albert Hendrickx (BEL)	Michard–Hutchinson	s.t.
9	Marcel Kint (BEL)	Mercier–Hutchinson	s.t.
10	Georges Claes (BEL)	Trialoux–Wolber	1' 05"
