= 1937 La Flèche Wallonne =

Race details
- Dates: 2 May 1937
- Stages: 1
- Distance: 280 km (174.0 mi)
- Winning time: 9h 18' 06"

Results
	Winner	Adolph Braeckeveldt (BEL)
	Second	Marcel Kint (BEL)
	Third	Albert Perikel (BEL)

The 1937 La Flèche Wallonne was the second edition of La Flèche Wallonne cycle race and was held on 2 May 1937. The race started in Tournai and finished in Ans. The race was won by Adolph Braeckeveldt.

== General classification ==
Final general classification

Rank	Rider	Time
1	Adolph Braeckeveldt (BEL)	9h 18' 06"
2	Marcel Kint (BEL)	+ 6"
3	Albert Perikel (BEL)	+ 7' 02"
4	René Walschot (BEL)	+ 7' 26"
5	Marcel Van Houtte (BEL)	+ 7' 44"
6	Frans Bonduel (BEL)	+ 7' 44"
7	Camiel Michielsens (BEL)	+ 7' 44"
8	Henri Garnier (BEL)	+ 7' 44"
9	Georges Christiaens (BEL)	+ 7' 44"
10	Jef Moerenhout (BEL)	+ 15' 34"
