= 1948 La Flèche Wallonne =

Race details
- Dates: 21 April 1948
- Stages: 1
- Distance: 234 km (145.4 mi)
- Winning time: 6h 46' 06"

Results
	Winner	Fermo Camellini (ITA)
	Second	Briek Schotte (BEL)
	Third	Camille Beeckman (BEL)

The 1948 La Flèche Wallonne was the 12th edition of La Flèche Wallonne cycle race and was held on 21 April 1948. The race started in Charleroi and finished in Liège. The race was won by Fermo Camellini.

== General classification ==
Final general classification

Rank	Rider	Time
1	Fermo Camellini (ITA)	6h 46' 06"
2	Briek Schotte (BEL)	+ 3' 16"
3	Camille Beeckman (BEL)	+ 3' 16"
4	Lucien Lauk (FRA)	+ 3' 37"
5	Adolph Verschueren (BEL)	+ 5' 44"
6	Maurice Mollin (BEL)	+ 5' 44"
7	Achiel Buysse (BEL)	+ 5' 44"
8	Gerard Buyl (BEL)	+ 5' 44"
9	Pino Cerami (ITA)	+ 5' 44"
10	Albert Ramon (BEL)	+ 5' 44"
