= 1949 Gent–Wevelgem =

Race details
- Dates: 3 April 1949
- Stages: 1
- Distance: 250 km (160 mi)
- Winning time: 7h 15' 00"

Results
	Winner	Marcel Kint (BEL)
	Second	André Declercq (BEL)
	Third	Albert Decin (BEL)

The 1949 Gent–Wevelgem was the 11th edition of the Belgian Gent–Wevelgem cycle race and was held on 3 April 1949. The race started in Ghent and finished in Wevelgem. The race was won by Marcel Kint.

== General classification ==
Final general classification

Rank	Rider	Time
1	Marcel Kint (BEL)	7h 15' 00"
2	André Declercq (BEL)	+ 0"
3	Albert Decin (BEL)	+ 0"
4	Valère Ollivier (BEL)	+ 0"
5	Maurice Mollin (BEL)	+ 0"
6	Joseph Van Stayen (BEL)	+ 0"
7	Roger Gyselinck (BEL)	+ 0"
8	Briek Schotte (BEL)	+ 2' 25"
9	Arthur Mommerency (BEL)	+ 2' 25"
10	André Rosseel (BEL)	+ 2' 25"
