= 1943 Paris–Roubaix =

Cycling race

Race details
- Dates: 25 April 1943
- Stages: 1
- Distance: 250 km (155.3 mi)
- Winning time: 6h 01' 32"

Results
	Winner	Marcel Kint (BEL)
	Second	Jules Lowie (BEL)
	Third	Louis Thiétard (FRA)

The 1943 Paris–Roubaix was the 41st edition of the Paris–Roubaix, a classic one-day cycle race in France. The single day event was held on 25 April 1943 and stretched 250 km (155 mi) from Paris to the finish at Roubaix Velodrome. The winner was Marcel Kint from Belgium.

== Results ==
Final results (1–10)
Rank	Cyclist	Time
1	Marcel Kint (BEL)	6h 01' 32″
2	Jules Lowie (BEL)	+0' 00″
3	Louis Thiétard (FRA)	+0' 00″
4	Achiel Buysse (BEL)	+0' 00″
5	Albert Sercu (BEL)	+0' 00″
6	Camille Danguillaume (FRA)	+0' 36″
7	Lucien Le Guével (FRA)	+0' 36″
8	Briek Schotte (BEL)	+2' 00″
9	René Adriaenssens (BEL)	+2' 51″
10	Joseph Goutorbe (FRA)	+2' 51″
