= Maurice Mollin =

Belgian cyclist

- Mollin in 1957

Personal information
- Full name: Maurice Mollin
- Born: 6 May 1924 Antwerp, Belgium
- Died: 5 August 2003 (aged 79) Deurne, Belgium

Cycling career
- Sport: Cycling
- Role: Rider

Maurice Mollin (6 May 1924 – 5 August 2003) was a Belgian racing cyclist. He rode in the 1947 and 1948 Tour de France. He finished in fifth place in the 1957 Paris–Roubaix.

== Major results ==
1946
8th Schaal Sels
1947
7th Brussel-Ingooigem
1948
1st Liège-Bastogne-Liège
1st Stage 3 Tour de Belgique
5th Circuit des XI Villes
6th La Flèche Wallonne
1949
3rd Omloop Het Volk
3rd Overall Tour de Belgique
5th Gent-Wevelgem
8th La Flèche Wallonne
8th Paris-Bruxelles
10th Paris-Tours
1951
7th Brussel-Ingooigem
1952
1st Stage 2 Tour de Belgique
3rd Brussel-Ingooigem
5th Schaal Sels
10th Ronde van Brabant
1953
2nd Omloop Het Volk
2nd Kampioenschap van Vlaanderen
4th Scheldeprijs
6th Circuit des XI Villes
1955
6th Bruxelles-Bost
1957
4th Brussel-Ingooigem
5th Paris - Roubaix
6th Omloop Het Volk
10th Kuurne-Bruxelles-Kuurne
