= 1948 Liège–Bastogne–Liège =

Race details
- Dates: 2 May 1948
- Stages: 1
- Distance: 213 km (132 mi)
- Winning time: 5h 52' 00"

Results
	Winner	Maurice Mollin (BEL)
	Second	Raymond Impanis (BEL)
	Third	Louis Caput (FRA)

The 1948 Liège–Bastogne–Liège was the 34th edition of the Liège–Bastogne–Liège cycle race and was held on 2 May 1948. The race started and finished in Liège. The race was won by Maurice Mollin.

== General classification ==
Final general classification

Rank	Rider	Time
1	Maurice Mollin (BEL)	5h 52' 00"
2	Raymond Impanis (BEL)	+ 0"
3	Louis Caput (FRA)	+ 0"
4	Adolph Verschueren (BEL)	+ 0"
5	Camille Danguillaume (FRA)	+ 0"
6	Frans Leenen (BEL)	+ 0"
7	Henri Van Kerckhove (BEL)	+ 0"
8	Edward Van Dijck (BEL)	+ 0"
9	Marcel Rijckaert (BEL)	+ 0"
10	Albert Dubuisson (BEL)	+ 0"
