= 1947 Omloop Het Volk =

Race details
- Dates: 23 March 1947
- Stages: 1
- Distance: 240 km (150 mi)
- Winning time: 7h 18' 35"

Results
	Winner	Albert Sercu (BEL)
	Second	Emile Faignaert (BEL)
	Third	Achiel Buysse (BEL)

The 1947 Omloop Het Volk was the third edition of the Omloop Het Volk cycle race and was held on 23 March 1947. The race started and finished in Ghent. The race was won by Albert Sercu.

== General classification ==
Final general classification
Rank	Rider	Time
1	Albert Sercu (BEL)	7h 18' 35"
2	Emile Faignaert (BEL)	+ 2"
3	Achiel Buysse (BEL)	+ 56"
4	Émile Masson (BEL)	+ 1' 00"
5	René Oreel (BEL)	+ 1' 01"
6	Sylvère Maes (BEL)	+ 1' 02"
7	André Rosseel (BEL)	+ 1' 02"
8	Maurice Meersman (BEL)	+ 1' 02"
9	Maurice Desimpelaere (BEL)	+ 1' 02"
10	Briek Schotte (BEL)	+ 1' 03"
