= 1946 UCI Road World Championships – Men's road race =

Men's Individual Road Race
1946 UCI Road World Championships
- Rainbow jersey

Race details
- Dates: 1 September 1946
- Stages: 1
- Distance: 270 km (167.8 mi)
- Winning time: 7h 24' 28"

Results
	Winner	Hans Knecht (SUI)	(Switzerland)
	Second	Marcel Kint (BEL)	(Belgium)
	Third	Rik Van Steenbergen (BEL)	(Belgium)

The men's road race at the 1946 UCI Road World Championships was the 13th edition of the event. The race took place on Sunday 1 September 1946 in Zürich, Switzerland. The race was won by Hans Knecht of Switzerland.

== Final classification ==
General classification (1–10)

Rank	Rider	Time
1st place, gold medalist(s)	Hans Knecht (SUI)	7h 24' 28"
2nd place, silver medalist(s)	Marcel Kint (BEL)	+ 10"
3rd place, bronze medalist(s)	Rik Van Steenbergen (BEL)	+ 59"
4	Mario Ricci (ITA)	+ 1' 46"
5	Gerrit Schulte (NED)	+ 2' 42"
6	Jeng Kirchen (LUX)	+ 2' 42"
7	Joseph Bintener (LUX)	+ 4' 47"
8	Adolfo Leoni (ITA)	+ 4' 47"
9	Guy Lapébie (FRA)	+ 6' 55"
10	Mathias Clemens (LUX)	+ 6' 55"
