= 1946 Tour of Flanders =

Race details
- Dates: April 14, 1946
- Stages: 1
- Distance: 246 km (153 mi)
- Winning time: 6h 51' 00"

Results
	Winner	Rik van Steenbergen (BEL)
	Second	Louis Thiétard (FRA)
	Third	Briek Schotte (BEL)

The 30th running of the Tour of Flanders cycling classic was held on Sunday, 14 April 1946. 21-year old Rik van Steenbergen, who also won the 1944 edition, arrived solo. Of the 219 starting cyclists, 37 reached the finish.

== Route ==
The race started in Ghent and finished in Wetteren – totaling 246 km (152.9 miles). Winner Van Steenbergen completed the course with an average of 35,9 km/h.

The course featured 3 categorized climbs:

- Kwaremont
- Kruisberg
- Edelareberg

== General classification ==
=== Final general classification ===
Rank	Rider	Team	Time
1	Rik van Steenbergen (BEL)	Mercier–Hutchinson	6h 51' 00"
2	Louis Thiétard (FRA)	Metropole–Dunlop	+ 1' 06"
3	Briek Schotte (BEL)	Alcyon–Dunlop	s.t.
4	Albert Sercu (BEL)	Dilecta–Wolber	+ 5' 36"
5	Sylvain Grysolle (BEL)	Rochet–Dunlop	s.t.
6	Michel Remue (BEL)	Alcyon–Dunlop	s.t.
7	Camille Beeckman (BEL)	Thompson	s.t.
8	Georges Claes (BEL)	Rochet–Dunlop	s.t.
9	Marcel Kint (BEL)	Mercier–Hutchinson	s.t.
10	Maurice Clautier (BEL)	Thompson	s.t.
