= Marcel Kint =

Belgian cyclist (1914–2002)

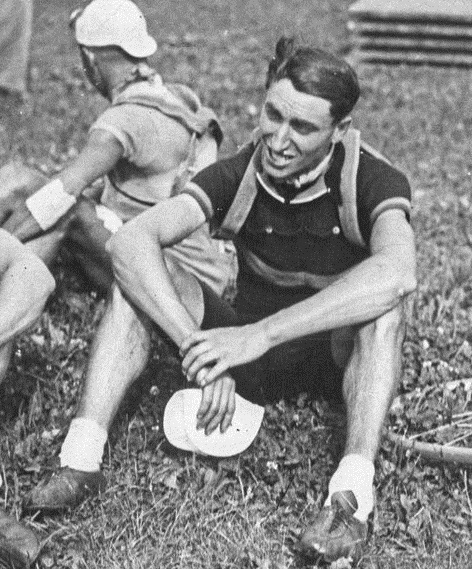
- Kint after winning stage 19 in the 1936 Tour de France

Personal information
- Full name: Marcel Kint
- Nickname: De Zwarte Arend (the black eagle)
- Born: 20 September 1914 Zwevegem, Belgium
- Died: 23 March 2002 (aged 87) Kortrijk, Belgium

Cycling career
- Sport: Cycling
- Discipline: Road
- Role: Rider

Professional teams
- 1935: Independent (semi-professional)
- 1936: Mercier–Hutchinson
- 1937: Fr. Pélissier
- 1937–1938: Mercier–Hutchinson
- 1938–1939: Fr. Pélissier
- 1939–1951: Mercier–Hutchinson
- 1950–1951: Girardengo

Major wins
- Grand Tours Tour de France 6 individual stages (1936, 1938, 1939) One-day races and Classics World Road Race Championships (1938) National Road Race Championship (1939) Paris–Roubaix (1943) Gent–Wevelgem (1949) La Flèche Wallonne (1943, 1944, 1945) Paris–Brussels (1938) Championship of Flanders (1935)
Medal record
Men's road bicycle racing
Representing Belgium
World Championships
| Gold medal – first place | 1938 Valkenburg | Elite Men's Road Race |
| Silver medal – second place | 1946 Zürich | Elite Men's Road Race |

Marcel Kint (20 September 1914 – 23 March 2002) was a Belgian professional road bicycle racer who won 31 races between 1935 and 1951. His finest year was 1938 when he won the World Cycling Championship, three stages of the Tour de France and the season-long competition equivalent to today's UCI ProTour.

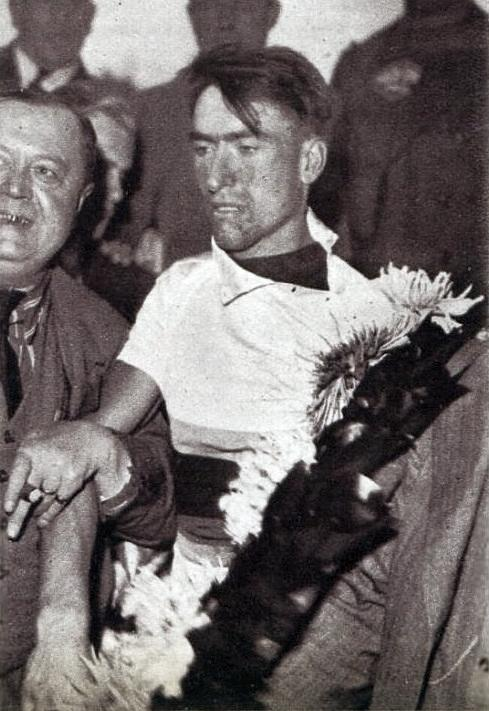
Marcel Kint, honored as world champion in 1938

He specialized in one-day classic cycle races and won Paris–Roubaix, Gent–Wevelgem, Paris–Brussels. He was the only three-time consecutive winner of La Flèche Wallonne until 2016 when Alejandro Valverde won his third consecutive race and fourth overall.

Kints honours would have been much bigger but at his sporting peak, his career was halted for a few years by World War II.

The outbreak of the war would make Marcel Kint the longest reigning world champion in the history of cycling. Kint would hold the rainbow jersey until 1946: eight years, and it could have been nine. In the final of the 1946 world championship in Zurich, Kint and Swiss rider Hans Knecht were riding to the finish, when Kint was stopped by fanatical home supporters, causing him to finish second.

== Major results ==
=== Road ===
1933
1st Junior National Road Race Championships
1934
1st stage 1 Tour of Belgium independents
1935
1st Kampioenschap van Vlaanderen
1st Stage 7 Tour de Luxembourg
1st Bruxelles-Liège
1st Ronde van Vlaanderen independents
1st Overall Tour of Belgium independents
Grote Prijs van Zwevegem
1st Jemeppe-Marche-Jemeppe
2nd Overall Circuit Franco-Belge
1936
1st Antwerpen–Gent–Antwerpen
1st Stage 2 Tour of Belgium
4th Overall Paris–Nice
9th Overall Tour de France

1st Stage 19

1937
1st Gent–Ieper
2nd La Flèche Wallonne
2nd Paris–Lille
6th Paris–Brussels
10th Overall Paris–Nice
1938
1st Road race, World Road Championships
1st Paris–Brussels
1st GP d'Espéraza
2nd Liège–Bastogne–Liège
3rd Tour of Flanders
3rd National Road Race Championships
7th Paris–Tours
9th Overall Tour de France

1st Stages 15, 16 & 18

1939
1st Stages 8A & 18B Tour de France
1st National Road Race Championships
1st Antwerpen–Gent–Antwerpen
1st Ransart-Beaumont-Ransart
1st GP Stad Zottegem
2nd Paris–Roubaix
5th Paris–Brussels
5th Bordeaux–Paris
1939
1st Circuit de Belgique
1942
1st Gullegem Koerse
1943
1st La Flèche Wallonne
1st Paris–Roubaix
1st Ronde van Limburg
1st Brussels-Paris
1st Circuit de Belgique
5th Tour of Flanders
8th Paris–Tours
1944
1st La Flèche Wallonne
1st Grand Prix Jules Lowie
1st Grand Prix du Printemps
9th Tour of Flanders
1st Grote Prijs Beeckman-De Caluwé
1945
1st La Flèche Wallonne
1st Omloop der Vlaamse Ardennen Ichtegem
1st Dwars door West-Vlaanderen
2nd Textielprijs Vichte
1946
1st National Road Race Championships Interclubs
2nd Road race, World Road Championships
2nd GP du Locle
9th Tour of Flanders
10th Paris–Roubaix
1947
1st National Road Race Championships Interclubs
1949
1st Gent–Wevelgem
2nd Gullegem Koerse
2nd Textielprijs Vichte
4th Kuurne–Brussels–Kuurne
1950
5th Kuurne–Brussels–Kuurne
8th Overall Roma–Napoli–Roma
10th Paris–Roubaix
1951
1st Elfstedenronde
7th La Flèche Wallonne
9th Liège–Bastogne–Liège

=== Track ===
1946
1st Prix Hourlier-Comès (with Rik Van Steenbergen)
1947
1st Six Hours of Zürich (with Rik Van Steenbergen)
1948
1st Six Days of Brussels (with Rik Van Steenbergen)
1st Trophée des Routiers (with Rik Van Steenbergen)
1949
1st Six Days of Brussels (with Rik Van Steenbergen)
2nd Six Days of Ghent (with Rik Van Steenbergen)
3rd Six Days of Paris (with Rik Van Steenbergen)
