= 1944 La Flèche Wallonne =

Race details
- Dates: 24 May 1944
- Stages: 1
- Distance: 208 km (129 mi)
- Winning time: 6h 11' 00"

Results
| | Winner | Marcel Kint (BEL) |
| | Second | Briek Schotte (BEL) |
| | Third | Marcel Quertinmont (BEL) |

The 1944 La Flèche Wallonne was the eighth edition of La Flèche Wallonne cycle race and was held on 24 May 1944. The race started in Mons and finished in Charleroi. The race was won by Marcel Kint.

== General classification ==
Final general classification

| Rank | Rider | Time |
|---|---|---|
| 1 | Marcel Kint (BEL) | 6h 11' 00" |
| 2 | Briek Schotte (BEL) | + 0" |
| 3 | Marcel Quertinmont (BEL) | + 0" |
| 4 | Jules Lowie (BEL) | + 0" |
| 5 | Charles Terryn (BEL) | + 2' 58" |
| 6 | Petrus Vanderrusten (BEL) | + 8' 04" |
| 7 | Marcel Lavaux (BEL) | + 8' 04" |
| 8 | Albert Dubuisson (BEL) | + 9' 12" |
| 9 | Denis Van Dijck (BEL) | + 9' 12" |
| 10 | Jean Claessens (BEL) | + 9' 12" |
