= Philémon De Meersman =

Belgian cyclist

Personal information
- Born: 15 November 1914 Berchem-Sainte-Agathe, Belgium
- Died: 2 April 2005 (aged 90) Dilbeek, Belgium

Cycling career
- Sport: Cycling
- Discipline: Road
- Role: Rider

Professional team
- 1936–1938: La Française-Dunlop

Major wins
- One-day races and Classics La Flèche Wallonne (1936)

Philémon De Meersman (15 November 1914 in Berchem-Sainte-Agathe – 2 April 2005 in Dilbeek) was a Belgian cyclist.

== Palmares ==
1936
1st La Flèche Wallonne
1939
1st Stage 7 Tour du Nord
