= Karel Thijs =

Belgian cyclist

Personal information
- Born: 5 May 1918 Antwerp, Belgium
- Died: 5 March 1990 (aged 71) Antwerp, Belgium

Cycling career
- Sport: Cycling
- Role: Rider

Karel Thijs (5 May 1918 – 5 March 1990) was a Belgian racing cyclist. He won the 1942 edition of La Flèche Wallonne.
