= La Flèche Wallonne =

Belgian one-day road cycling race

Race details
- Date: Late April
- Region: Wallonia, Belgium
- English name: Walloon Arrow
- Local name: La Flèche Wallonne (in French)
- Discipline: Road
- Competition: UCI World Tour
- Type: One-day
- Organiser: Amaury Sport Organisation
- Web site: www.la-fleche-wallonne.be

History
- First edition: 1936
- Editions: 90 (as of 2026)
- First winner: Philippe Demeersman (BEL)
- Most wins: Alejandro Valverde (ESP) (5 wins)
- Most recent: Paul Seixas (FRA)

La Flèche Wallonne (pronounced [la flɛʃ walɔn], French for "The Walloon Arrow") is a men's professional cycle road race held in April each year in Wallonia, Belgium. It is part of the UCI World Tour.

The first of two Belgian Ardennes classics, La Flèche Wallonne is today normally held mid-week between the Amstel Gold Race and Liège–Bastogne–Liège. At one time, La Flèche Wallonne and Liège–Bastogne–Liège were run on successive days as "Le Weekend Ardennais" (both races are organised by Amaury Sport Organisation). Only eight riders have achieved the "Ardennes double" by winning both races in the same year: Alejandro Valverde three times (in 2006, 2015 and 2017), Ferdi Kübler twice (in 1951 and 1952), Stan Ockers (1955), Eddy Merckx (1972), Moreno Argentin (1991), Davide Rebellin (2004), Philippe Gilbert (2011), and Tadej Pogačar (2025).

Since 1998, a women's event has been held on the same day, part of the UCI Women's World Tour.

== History ==
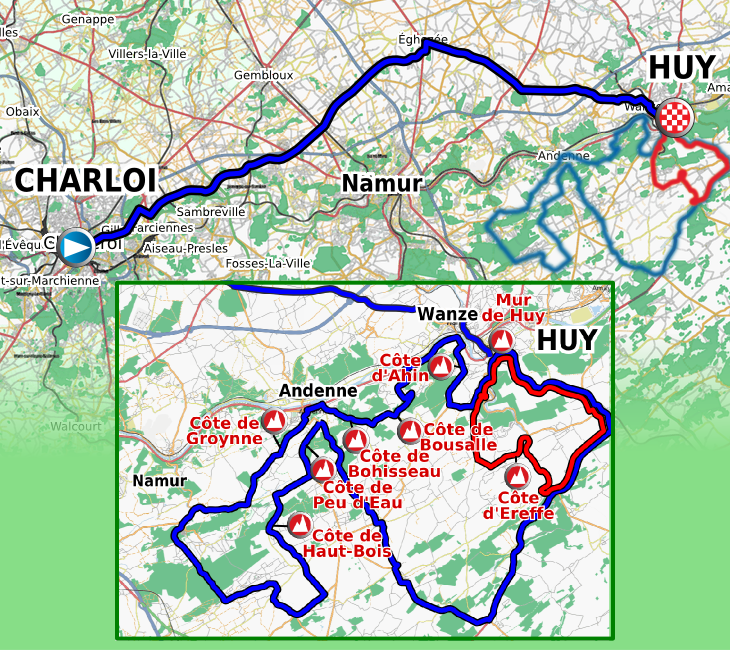
The 2011 La Flèche Wallonne route

La Flèche Wallonne was created to boost the sales of a newspaper Les Sports during the 1930s and was first run in 1936. While perhaps not as revered as one of the five Classic 'Monuments', the race is widely regarded as among the most significant spring Classics, alongside the Amstel Gold and Strade Bianche, and featured on the UCI Road World Cup and UCI ProTour. It became part of the UCI World Ranking calendar in 2009.

Like many cycle race events, the course has altered considerably over the years, both in route and length. The event was first run on roads from Tournai to Liège (growing from 236 km to 300 km — its longest ever distance — in 1938), after which Mons became the starting point. From 1948, the race started at Charleroi; from 1960 the event ran in the opposite direction, starting at Liège and finishing at Charleroi (or, from 1965, Marcinelle). Some years have seen the event start and finish in the same place: Verviers (1974–1978) or Huy (1983–1985). From 1986, the race started in Spa and finished in Huy. Since 1990, the race distance has not exceeded 210 km.

Since its inception, it has been held every year except 1940, due to World War II. In 2020, it was rescheduled to September due to the COVID-19 pandemic.

Today, the event starts in Charleroi and heads east to Huy, where the riders do three laps of a tough circuit including the steep Mur de Huy (the Wall of Huy) climb, with several sections steeper than 15% and up to 26% on one section. The finish is at the top of the Mur after the third ascent.

Alejandro Valverde has won the race a record five times. Five riders have won the race three times, two of them Belgians, two Italians, and one Frenchman. Five riders have won the race in back to back years. Indeed, Belgian riders dominated the early years of the event, winning the first 11 editions of the race, and slightly less than half of the editions in total (38 victories up to and including 2011). Italians have won the event 18 times.

== Winners ==
Year	Country	Rider	Team
1936	Belgium	Philemon De Meersman	La Française
1937	Belgium	Adolph Braeckeveldt	Helyett
1938	Belgium	Émile Masson Jr.	
1939	Belgium	Edmond Delathouwer	Leducq-Mercier
1940	No race		
1941	Belgium	Sylvain Grysolle	
1942	Belgium	Karel Thijs	
1943	Belgium	Marcel Kint	
1944	Belgium	Marcel Kint	
1945	Belgium	Marcel Kint	
1946	Belgium	Désiré Keteleer	Groene Leeuw
1947	Belgium	Ernest Sterckx	Alcyon–Dunlop
1948	Italy	Fermo Camellini	Métropole
1949	Belgium	Rik Van Steenbergen	Mercier–Hutchinson
1950	Italy	Fausto Coppi	Bianchi–Ursus
1951	Switzerland	Ferdi Kübler	Tebag
1952	Switzerland	Ferdi Kübler	Tebag
1953	Belgium	Stan Ockers	Peugeot–Dunlop
1954	Belgium	Germain Derycke	Alcyon–Dunlop
1955	Belgium	Stan Ockers	Elvé–Peugeot
1956	Belgium	Richard Van Genechten	Elvé–Peugeot
1957	Belgium	Raymond Impanis	Peugeot-BP
1958	Belgium	Rik Van Steenbergen	Elvé–Peugeot–Marvan
1959	Belgium	Jos Hoevenaers	Faema
1960	Belgium	Pino Cerami	Peugeot–BP–Dunlop
1961	Belgium	Willy Vannitsen	Gitane–Geminiani–Leroux–Dunlop
1962	Belgium	Henri De Wolf	Baratti–Milano
1963	France	Raymond Poulidor	Mercier–BP–Hutchinson
1964	Belgium	Gilbert Desmet	Wiel's–Groene Leeuw
1965	Italy	Roberto Poggiali	Ignis
1966	Italy	Michele Dancelli	Molteni
1967	Belgium	Eddy Merckx	Peugeot–BP–Michelin
1968	Belgium	Rik Van Looy	Willem II–Gazelle
1969	Belgium	Jos Huysmans	Dr.Mann–Grundig
1970	Belgium	Eddy Merckx	Faemino
1971	Belgium	Roger De Vlaeminck	Mars–Flandria
1972	Belgium	Eddy Merckx	Molteni
1973	Belgium	André Dierickx	Flandria–Shimano–Carpenter
1974	Belgium	Frans Verbeeck	Watney–Maes
1975	Belgium	André Dierickx	Rokado
1976	Netherlands	Joop Zoetemelk	Gan–Mercier–Hutchinson
1977	Italy	Francesco Moser	Sanson
1978	France	Michel Laurent	Peugeot–Esso–Michelin
1979	France	Bernard Hinault	Renault–Gitane–Campagnolo
1980	Italy	Giuseppe Saronni	Gis Gelati–Colnago
1981	Belgium	Daniel Willems	Capri Sonne–Koga Miyata
1982	Italy	Mario Beccia	Hoonved–Bottechia
1983	France	Bernard Hinault	Renault–Elf–Gitane
1984	Denmark	Kim Andersen	Coop–Hoonved
1985	Belgium	Claude Criquielion	Hitachi–Splendor–Sunair
1986	France	Laurent Fignon	Système U
1987	France	Jean-Claude Leclercq	Toshiba–Look
1988	West Germany	Rolf Gölz	Superconfex–Yoko
1989	Belgium	Claude Criquielion	Hitachi–Merckx–Mavic
1990	Italy	Moreno Argentin	Ariostea
1991	Italy	Moreno Argentin	Ariostea
1992	Italy	Giorgio Furlan	Ariostea
1993	Italy	Maurizio Fondriest	Lampre
1994	Italy	Moreno Argentin	Gewiss–Ballan
1995	France	Laurent Jalabert	ONCE
1996	United States	Lance Armstrong	Motorola
1997	France	Laurent Jalabert	ONCE
1998	Denmark	Bo Hamburger	Casino–Ag2r
1999	Italy	Michele Bartoli	Mapei–Quick-Step
2000	Italy	Francesco Casagrande	Vini Caldirola–Sidermec
2001	Belgium	Rik Verbrugghe	Lotto–Adecco
2002	Belgium	Mario Aerts	Lotto–Adecco
2003	Spain	Igor Astarloa	Saeco
2004	Italy	Davide Rebellin	Gerolsteiner
2005	Italy	Danilo Di Luca	Liquigas–Bianchi
2006	Spain	Alejandro Valverde	Caisse d'Epargne–Illes Balears
2007	Italy	Davide Rebellin	Gerolsteiner
2008	Luxembourg	Kim Kirchen	Team High Road
2009	Italy	Davide Rebellin	Diquigiovanni–Androni
2010	Australia	Cadel Evans	BMC Racing Team
2011	Belgium	Philippe Gilbert	Omega Pharma–Lotto
2012	Spain	Joaquim Rodríguez	Team Katusha
2013	Spain	Daniel Moreno	Team Katusha
2014	Spain	Alejandro Valverde	Movistar Team
2015	Spain	Alejandro Valverde	Movistar Team
2016	Spain	Alejandro Valverde	Movistar Team
2017	Spain	Alejandro Valverde	Movistar Team
2018	France	Julian Alaphilippe	Quick-Step Floors
2019	France	Julian Alaphilippe	Deceuninck–Quick-Step
2020	Switzerland	Marc Hirschi	Team Sunweb
2021	France	Julian Alaphilippe	Deceuninck–Quick-Step
2022	Belgium	Dylan Teuns	Team Bahrain Victorious
2023	Slovenia	Tadej Pogačar	UAE Team Emirates
2024	Great Britain	Stephen Williams	Israel–Premier Tech
2025	Slovenia	Tadej Pogačar	UAE Team Emirates XRG
2026	France	Paul Seixas	Decathlon CMA CGM

=== Multiple winners ===
Riders in italics are still active

Wins	Rider	Editions
5	Alejandro Valverde (ESP)	2006, 2014, 2015, 2016, 2017
3	Marcel Kint (BEL)	1943, 1944, 1945
3	Eddy Merckx (BEL)	1967, 1970, 1972
3	Moreno Argentin (ITA)	1990, 1991, 1994
3	Davide Rebellin (ITA)	2004, 2007, 2009
3	Julian Alaphilippe (FRA)	2018, 2019, 2021
2	Ferdinand Kübler (SUI)	1951, 1952
2	Stan Ockers (BEL)	1953, 1955
2	Rik Van Steenbergen (BEL)	1949, 1958
2	André Dierickx (BEL)	1973, 1975
2	Bernard Hinault (FRA)	1979, 1983
2	Claude Criquielion (BEL)	1985, 1989
2	Laurent Jalabert (FRA)	1995, 1997
2	Tadej Pogačar (SLO)	2023, 2025

=== Wins per country ===
Wins	Country
39	Belgium
18	Italy
12	France
8	Spain
3	Switzerland
2	Denmark; Slovenia
1	Australia; Germany; Great Britain; Luxembourg; Netherlands; United States
