= 1958 La Flèche Wallonne =

Race details
- Dates: 26 April 1958
- Stages: 1
- Distance: 235 km (146.0 mi)
- Winning time: 6h 31' 00"

Results
	Winner	Rik Van Steenbergen (BEL)
	Second	Jef Planckaert (BEL)
	Third	Pierre Everaert (FRA)

The 1958 La Flèche Wallonne was the 22nd edition of La Flèche Wallonne cycle race and was held on 26 April 1958. The race started in Charleroi and finished in Liège. The race was won by Rik Van Steenbergen.

== General classification ==
Final general classification

Rank	Rider	Time
1	Rik Van Steenbergen (BEL)	6h 31' 00"
2	Jef Planckaert (BEL)	+ 3"
3	Pierre Everaert (FRA)	+ 11"
4	Fred De Bruyne (BEL)	+ 11"
5	Willy Vannitsen (BEL)	+ 11"
6	Raymond Impanis (BEL)	+ 11"
7	Ercole Baldini (ITA)	+ 1' 12"
8	Maurice Meuleman (BEL)	+ 1' 15"
9	Yvo Molenaers (BEL)	+ 2' 40"
10	Charly Gaul (LUX)	+ 2' 45"
