= 1951 Liège–Bastogne–Liège =

Race details
- Dates: 22 April 1951
- Stages: 1
- Distance: 211 km (131 mi)
- Winning time: 5h 41' 01"

Results
	Winner	Ferdinand Kübler (SUI)
	Second	Germain Derycke (BEL)
	Third	Wout Wagtmans (NED)

The 1951 Liège–Bastogne–Liège was the 37th edition of the Liège–Bastogne–Liège cycle race and was held on 22 April 1951. The race started and finished in Liège. The race was won by Ferdinand Kübler.

== General classification ==
Final general classification

Rank	Rider	Time
1	Ferdinand Kübler (SUI)	5h 41' 01"
2	Germain Derycke (BEL)	+ 0"
3	Wout Wagtmans (NED)	+ 21"
4	Jean Brun (SUI)	+ 27"
5	Jean Robic (FRA)	+ 27"
6	Gino Bartali (ITA)	+ 27"
7	Louison Bobet (FRA)	+ 27"
8	Ernest Sterckx (BEL)	+ 27"
9	Marcel Kint (BEL)	+ 27"
10	Valère Ollivier (BEL)	+ 27"
