= 1949 La Flèche Wallonne =

Race details
- Dates: 13 April 1949
- Stages: 1
- Distance: 231 km (143.5 mi)
- Winning time: 6h 20' 34"

Results
| | Winner | Rik Van Steenbergen (BEL) |
| | Second | Edward Peeters (BEL) |
| | Third | Fausto Coppi (ITA) |

The 1949 La Flèche Wallonne was the 13th edition of La Flèche Wallonne cycle race and was held on 13 April 1949. The race started in Charleroi and finished in Liège. The race was won by Rik Van Steenbergen.

== General classification ==
Final general classification

| Rank | Rider | Time |
|---|---|---|
| 1 | Rik Van Steenbergen (BEL) | 6h 20' 34" |
| 2 | Edward Peeters (BEL) | + 0" |
| 3 | Fausto Coppi (ITA) | + 0" |
| 4 | Pino Cerami (ITA) | + 0" |
| 5 | Marcel De Mulder (BEL) | + 0" |
| 6 | Roger Gyselinck (BEL) | + 41" |
| 7 | Louis Caput (FRA) | + 3' 11" |
| 8 | Maurice Mollin (BEL) | + 3' 11" |
| 9 | Louison Bobet (FRA) | + 3' 11" |
| 10 | Joseph Verhaert (BEL) | + 3' 11" |
