= 1945 La Flèche Wallonne =

Race details
- Dates: 3 June 1945
- Stages: 1
- Distance: 213 km (132 mi)
- Winning time: 6h 12' 07"

Results
	Winner	Marcel Kint (BEL)
	Second	Lucien Vlaemynck (BEL)
	Third	André Maelbrancke (BEL)

The 1945 La Flèche Wallonne was the ninth edition of La Flèche Wallonne cycle race and was held on 3 June 1945. The race started in Mons and finished in Charleroi. The race was won by Marcel Kint.

== General classification ==
Final general classification

Rank	Rider	Time
1	Marcel Kint (BEL)	6h 12' 07"
2	Lucien Vlaemynck (BEL)	+ 0"
3	André Maelbrancke (BEL)	+ 0"
4	Briek Schotte (BEL)	+ 0"
5	Vital Sneyders (BEL)	+ 0"
6	Richard Depoorter (BEL)	+ 2' 41"
7	Albert Sercu (BEL)	+ 4' 07"
8	Sylvain Grysolle (BEL)	+ 4' 07"
9	Rik Renders (BEL)	+ 4' 07"
10	Jules Lowie (BEL)	+ 4' 07"
