= 1951 La Flèche Wallonne =

Race details
- Dates: 21 April 1951
- Stages: 1
- Distance: 220 km (136.7 mi)
- Winning time: 6h 21' 59"

Results
	Winner	Ferdinand Kübler (SUI)
	Second	Gino Bartali (ITA)
	Third	Jean Robic (FRA)

The 1951 La Flèche Wallonne was the 15th edition of La Flèche Wallonne cycle race and was held on 21 April 1951. The race started in Charleroi and finished in Liège. The race was won by Ferdinand Kübler.

== General classification ==
Final general classification

Rank	Rider	Time
1	Ferdinand Kübler (SUI)	6h 21' 59"
2	Gino Bartali (ITA)	+ 0"
3	Jean Robic (FRA)	+ 0"
4	Louison Bobet (FRA)	+ 0"
5	Nedo Logli (ITA)	+ 24"
6	Jean Brun (SUI)	+ 24"
7	Marcel Kint (BEL)	+ 24"
8	Bernard Gauthier (FRA)	+ 24"
9	Fiorenzo Magni (ITA)	+ 24"
10	Raymond Impanis (BEL)	+ 24"
