= 1949 UCI Road World Championships – Men's road race =

Men's Individual Road Race
1949 UCI Road World Championships
- Rainbow jersey

Race details
- Dates: 21 August 1949
- Stages: 1
- Distance: 290 km (180.2 mi)
- Winning time: 7h 34' 44"

Results
	Winner	Rik Van Steenbergen (BEL)	(Belgium)
	Second	Ferdinand Kübler (SUI)	(Switzerland)
	Third	Fausto Coppi (ITA)	(Italy)

The men's road race at the 1949 UCI Road World Championships was the 16th edition of the event. The race took place on Sunday 21 August 1949 in Copenhagen, Denmark. The race was won by Rik Van Steenbergen of Belgium.

== Final classification ==
General classification (1–10)

Rank	Rider	Time
1st place, gold medalist(s)	Rik Van Steenbergen (BEL)	7h 34' 44"
2nd place, silver medalist(s)	Ferdinand Kübler (SUI)	+ 0"
3rd place, bronze medalist(s)	Fausto Coppi (ITA)	+ 0"
4	Briek Schotte (BEL)	+ 3' 02"
5	Gerrit Schulte (NED)	+ 3' 25"
6	Ernst Stettler (SUI)	+ 3' 28"
7	Bim Diederich (LUX)	+ 3' 31"
8	Camille Danguillaume (FRA)	+ 4' 18"
9	Fiorenzo Magni (ITA)	+ 4' 18"
10	Maurice Diot (FRA)	+ 4' 18"
