= Kuipke =

Indoor velodrome in Ghent, Belgium

- Ghent Velodrome
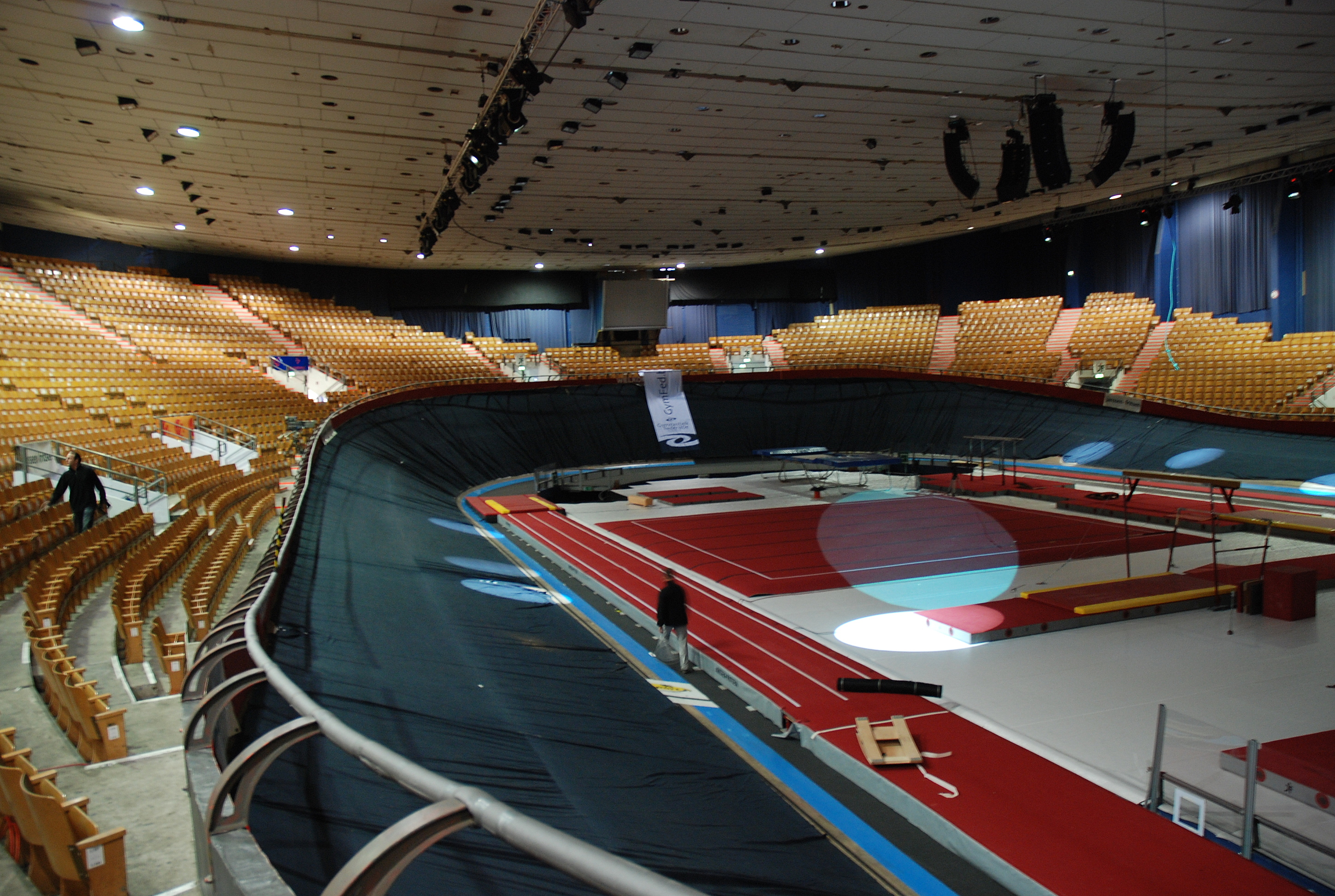
- Kuipke with covered track
- Interactive map of Kuipke
- Full name: Kuipke Gent
- Location: Citadelpark, Ghent (Belgium)
- Coordinates: 51°2′19″N 3°43′15″E
- Owner: City of Ghent
- Capacity: 3,000 seats
- Surface: wood
- Field size: 166.67 m (546.8 ft)

Construction
- Opened: 1927
- Renovated: 1965

Website
- kuipke.be

Kuipke or Citadel Park Velodrome is an indoor velodrome in Ghent, Belgium. It opened in 1927 and was rebuilt after a fire in 1965. It is best known from the Six Days of Ghent, held annually in November.

The velodrome is also used as an event hall for concerts and occasional basketball games. On 21 March 1959 Louis Armstrong performed in the Kuipke, and in 2014, it was the location for the live shows of the Flemish version of The Voice.

== History ==
The first velodrome in Citadel Park in Ghent was built in 1927 to accommodate the Six Days on a fixed location in the city center. The building previously served as a greenhouse and was renamed Sportpaleis Gent. Because of its short track and unusually steep gradient, it was nicknamed "Kuipke" (English: Little Tub). On 12 November 1962 the building was destroyed by fire, after which a second velodrome was opened on the same location in 1965. The new cycling track kept its original size of 167 m and steep bankings, and was officially renamed "Kuipke".

During the Six Days of Ghent in November 2006, Spanish cyclist Isaac Gálvez died after colliding with Dimitri De Fauw and subsequently crashing in the balustrades.

== See also ==
- List of cycling tracks and velodromes
