= 1956 UCI Road World Championships – Men's road race =

Men's Individual Road Race
1956 UCI Road World Championships
- Rainbow jersey

Race details
- Dates: 26 August 1956
- Stages: 1
- Distance: 285.1 km (177.2 mi)
- Winning time: 7h 26' 15"

Results
	Winner	Rik Van Steenbergen (BEL)	(Belgium)
	Second	Rik Van Looy (BEL)	(Belgium)
	Third	Gerrit Schulte (NED)	(Netherlands)

The men's road race at the 1956 UCI Road World Championships was the 23rd edition of the event. The race took place on Sunday 26 August 1956 in Copenhagen, Denmark. The race was won by Rik Van Steenbergen of Belgium.

== Final classification ==
General classification (1–10)

Rank	Rider	Time
1st place, gold medalist(s)	Rik Van Steenbergen (BEL)	7h 26' 15"
2nd place, silver medalist(s)	Rik Van Looy (BEL)	+ 0"
3rd place, bronze medalist(s)	Gerrit Schulte (NED)	+ 0"
4	Stan Ockers (BEL)	+ 0"
5	Fred De Bruyne (BEL)	+ 0"
6	Germain Derycke (BEL)	+ 0"
7	Gerrit Voorting (NED)	+ 0"
8	Louison Bobet (FRA)	+ 0"
9	Jacques Dupont (FRA)	+ 0"
10	Daan de Groot (NED)	+ 0"
