= Jacques Geus =

Belgian cyclist

Personal information
- Born: 22 February 1920 Laeken, Belgium
- Died: 13 July 1991 (aged 71) Saint-Josse-ten-Noode, Belgium

Cycling career
- Sport: Cycling
- Role: Rider

Jacques Geus (22 February 1920 – 13 July 1991) was a Belgian racing cyclist. He finished 27th in the 1949 Tour de France.
