= Albert Sercu =

Belgian cyclist

Personal information
- Born: 26 January 1918 Bornem, Belgium
- Died: 24 August 1978 (aged 60) Roeselare, Belgium

Cycling career
- Sport: Cycling
Medal record
Representing Belgium
Men's road bicycle racing
World Championships
Silver medal – second place	1947 Reims	Elite Men's Road Race
|}

Albert Sercu (26 January 1918, Bornem – 24 August 1978, Roeselare) was a Belgian professional road bicycle racer. He is most known for his silver medal in the Elite race of the 1947 UCI Road World Championships. He rode in the 1947 Tour de France. He is the father of Patrick Sercu.

== Major results ==
1939
1st, Tour of Flanders (amateur version)
1942
2nd, National Road Race Championship
1943 – Dilecta
2nd, Tour of Flanders
5th, Paris–Roubaix
1944 – Dilecta
1945 – Dilecta
1st, Bruges-Ghent-Bruges
1st, Brussels-Everbeek
1st, Omloop der Vlaamse Bergen
2nd, Tour of Flanders
7th, Flèche Wallonne
9th, Paris–Tours
1946 – Dilecta, JB Louvet, Dossche Cycles
1st, Brussels-Izegem
4th, Tour of Belgium

Winner Stages 4 & 6

4th, Tour of Flanders
1947 – Bertin, Arbos-Talbot
1st, Omloop "Het Volk"
1st, Brussels-Izegem
1st, Dwars door Vlaanderen
1st, Nokere Koerse
(silver) World Road Race Championship
2nd, Scheldeprijs
3rd, Paris–Tours
4th, Tour of Belgium

Winner Stages 1 & 3

9th, Milan–San Remo
1948 – Bertin-Wolber
1st, Omloop der Vlaamse Gewesten
2nd, Paris–Brussels
1949 – Bertin
1950 – Bertin
1st, Stages 3 & 10, Tour du Maroc
1951 – Bertin
