= Hans Knecht =

Swiss cyclist (1913–1986)

Personal information
- Full name: Hans Knecht
- Born: 26 September 1913 Albisrieden, Switzerland
- Died: 8 March 1986 (aged 72) Zürich, Switzerland

Cycling career
- Sport: Cycling
- Discipline: Road
- Role: Rider
Medal record
Representing Switzerland
Men's road bicycle racing
World Championships
| Gold medal – first place | 1946 Zürich | Elite Men's Road Race |
| Gold medal – first place | 1938 Valkenburg | Amateur's Road Race |

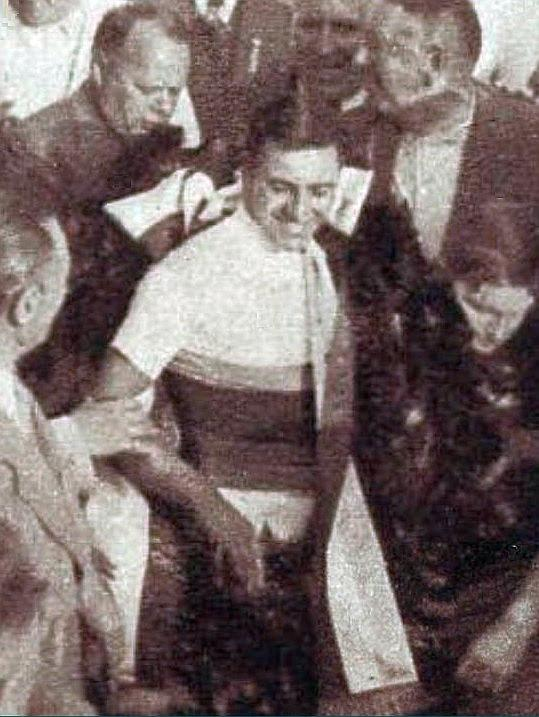
Hans Knecht

Hans Knecht (26 September 1913 – 8 March 1986) was a Swiss professional road racing cyclist. The highlight of his career was winning the World Cycling Championship in 1946. He was the Swiss National Road Race champion in 1943, 1946 and 1947. He was a professional cyclist from 1939 to 1949.
