= 1946 UCI Road World Championships =

- Location within Switzerland
- Venue: Zürich, Switzerland
- Dates: 31 August & 1 September 1946
- Coordinates: 47°22′28″N 08°32′28″E
- Events: 2

The 1946 UCI Road World Championships was the nineteenth edition of the UCI Road World Championships. It took place in Zürich, Switzerland on 31 August and 1 September 1946.

It was the third time the championships were organized in Zürich, after the 1923 and 1929 editions.

The course, with Zürich as both start and finish place, was around 189km for the amateurs and 270km for professional cyclists. Winner Hans Knecht finished with an average speed of 36.448 km/h.

In the same period, the 1946 UCI Track Cycling World Championships was organized in the Oerlikon Velodrome in Zürich.

== Events Summary ==
Event	Gold		Silver		Bronze	
Men's Events
Professional Road Race	Hans Knecht; Switzerland	7h 24' 28"	Marcel Kint; Belgium	+ 10"	Rik Van Steenbergen; Belgium	+ 59"
Amateur Road Race	Henry Aubry; France	-	Ernst Stettler; Switzerland	-	Henri van Kerckhoven; Belgium	-

== See also ==
- 1946 UCI Track Cycling World Championships
