= Rik Van Steenbergen =

Belgian cyclist (1924–2003)

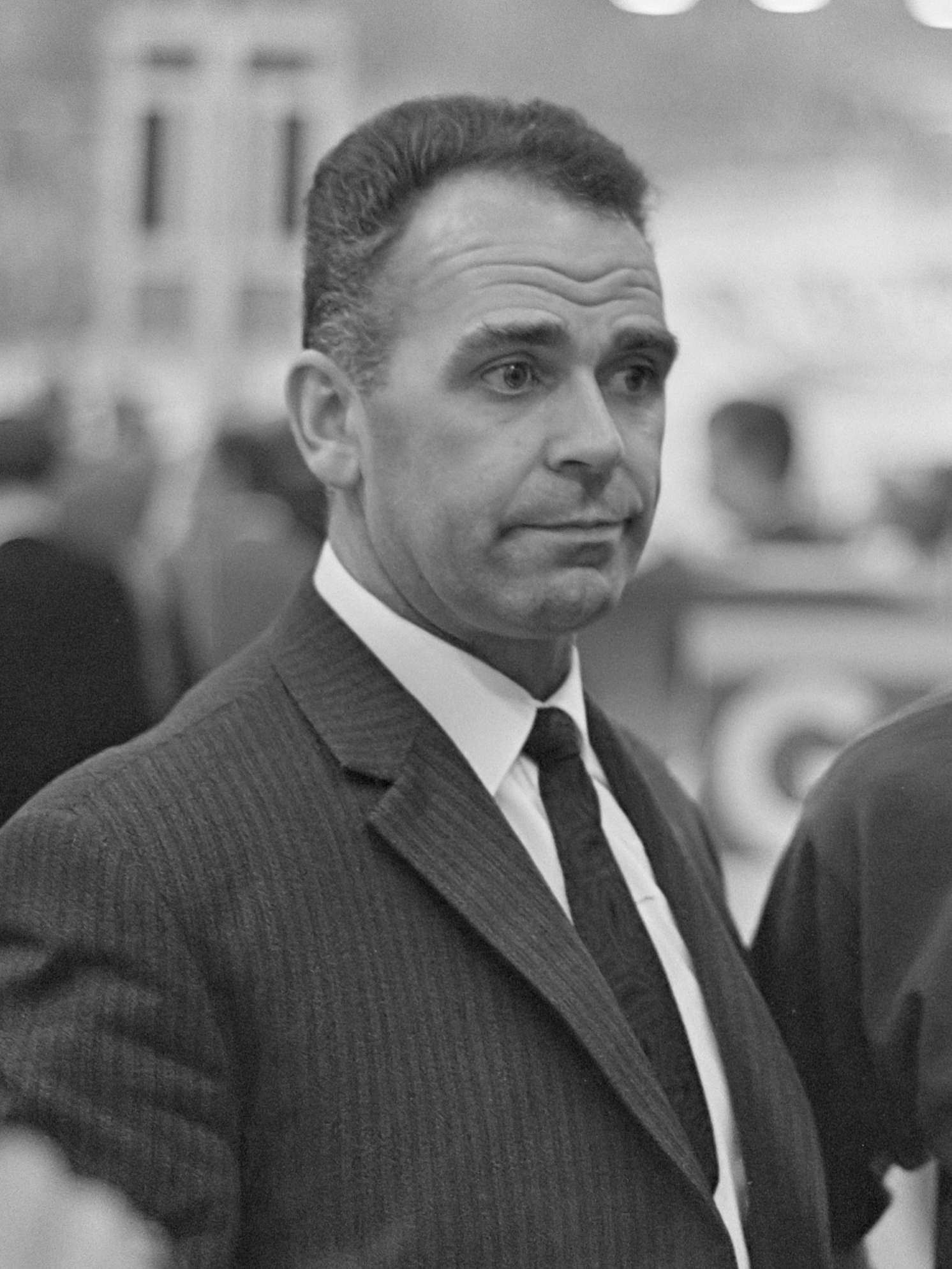
- Van Steenbergen in 1967

Personal information
- Full name: Rik Van Steenbergen
- Nicknames: Rik I (Rik II is Rik Van Looy); The Boss
- Born: Constant Hendrik Van Steenbergen; 9 September 1924 Arendonk, Belgium
- Died: 15 May 2003 (aged 78) Antwerp, Belgium

Cycling career
- Sport: Cycling
- Discipline: Road/Track
- Role: Rider
- Rider type: Classics specialist, sprinter

Professional teams
- 1943: Alcyon / Europe-Dunlop
- 1944: Trialoux-Wolber
- 1945-47: Mercier
- 1948: Mercier / Bristol
- 1950-51: Mercier / Girardengo-Ursus
- 1952: Mercier / Girardengo-Clement
- 1953: Mercier / Girardengo-Hutchinson
- 1954: Mercier / Girardengo-Eldorado
- 1955: Girardengo-Eldorado / Elvé-Peugeot
- 1956: Girardengo-Icep / Elvé-Peugeot
- 1957: Peugeot-BP-Dunlop / Cora-Elvé
- 1958: Elvé-Peugeot-Marvan
- 1959-60: Peugeot-BP-Dunlop
- 1961-62: Solo-Van Steenbergen
- 1963: Solo-Terrot-Van Steenbergen
- 1964-66: Solo–Superia

Major wins
- Grand Tours Tour de France 4 individual stages (1949, 1952, 1955) Giro d'Italia Sprints classification (1954, 1957) 15 individual stages (1951, 1952, 1953, 1954, 1956, 1957) Vuelta a España Points classification (1956) 6 individual stages (1956) Stage races Tour de l'Ouest (1951) Vuelta a la Argentina (1952) One-day races and Classics World Road Race Championships (1949, 1956, 1957) National Road Race Championships (1943, 1945, 1954) Tour of Flanders (1944, 1946) Dwars door Vlaanderen (1945) Paris–Roubaix (1948, 1952) La Flèche Wallonne (1949, 1958) Paris–Brussels (1950) Milan–San Remo (1954) Other Ruban Jaune (1948->1955) Critérium des As (1948, 1952, 1955, 1957, 1958) Track Championships National Track Championships Madison (1955, 1961) Omnium (1944, 1955, 1961, 1963) Men's Individual Pursuit (1944) Derny (1961, 1962, 1963, 1964) European Track Championships Madison (1958, 1959, 1960, 1961, 1963) Omnium (1959)
Medal record
Representing Belgium
Men's road bicycle racing
World Championships
Gold medal – first place	1949 Copenhagen	Professional Road Race
Gold medal – first place	1956 Copenhagen	Professional Road Race
Gold medal – first place	1957 Waregem	Professional Road Race
Bronze medal – third place	1946 Zürich	Professional Road Race
Men's track cycling
European Championships
Gold medal – first place	1958 Kopenhagen	Madison
Gold medal – first place	1959 Dortmund	Omnium
Gold medal – first place	1959 Zürich	Madison
Gold medal – first place	1960 Antwerp	Madison
Gold medal – first place	1961 Köln	Madison
Gold medal – first place	1963 Brussels	Madison
Silver medal – second place	1962 Dortmund	Omnium
Silver medal – second place	1963 Antwerp	Derny
Silver medal – second place	1964 Antwerp	Derny
Silver medal – second place	1965 Bremen	Madison
Silver medal – second place	1966 Brussels	Madison
Silver medal – second place	1966 Köln	Omnium
Bronze medal – third place	1956 Zürich	Omnium
Bronze medal – third place	1961 Kopenhagen	Omnium
Bronze medal – third place	1962 Zürich	Madison
Bronze medal – third place	1963 Köln	Omnium

Hendrik Van Steenbergen (9 September 1924 – 15 May 2003) was a Belgian racing cyclist, considered to be one of the best among the great number of successful Belgian cyclists.

== Early life ==
Van Steenbergen was born in Arendonk into a poor family. As a fledgling teenager, he worked successively as cigar-roller in a factory, as errand boy and as bicycle mechanic. Dreaming of a cycling career like that of his idol Karel Kaers, the tall youngster started his first street race in Morkhoven on April 4, 1939, and won it. He eventually became one of Belgium's best juniors from 1939 to 1942, winning 52 road races.

== Career ==
Van Steenbergen was considered a "medical marvel" due to the exceptional large heart he had.

He started cycling as a professional during World War II in 1942, after being an amateur since he was 14. Although the official age limit was 21, it was decided that he could enter the professional circuit directly at the age of 18. The next year, he won his first important races, and became Belgian road cycling champion. In 1944, he won the Tour of Flanders classic, which he won again two years later.

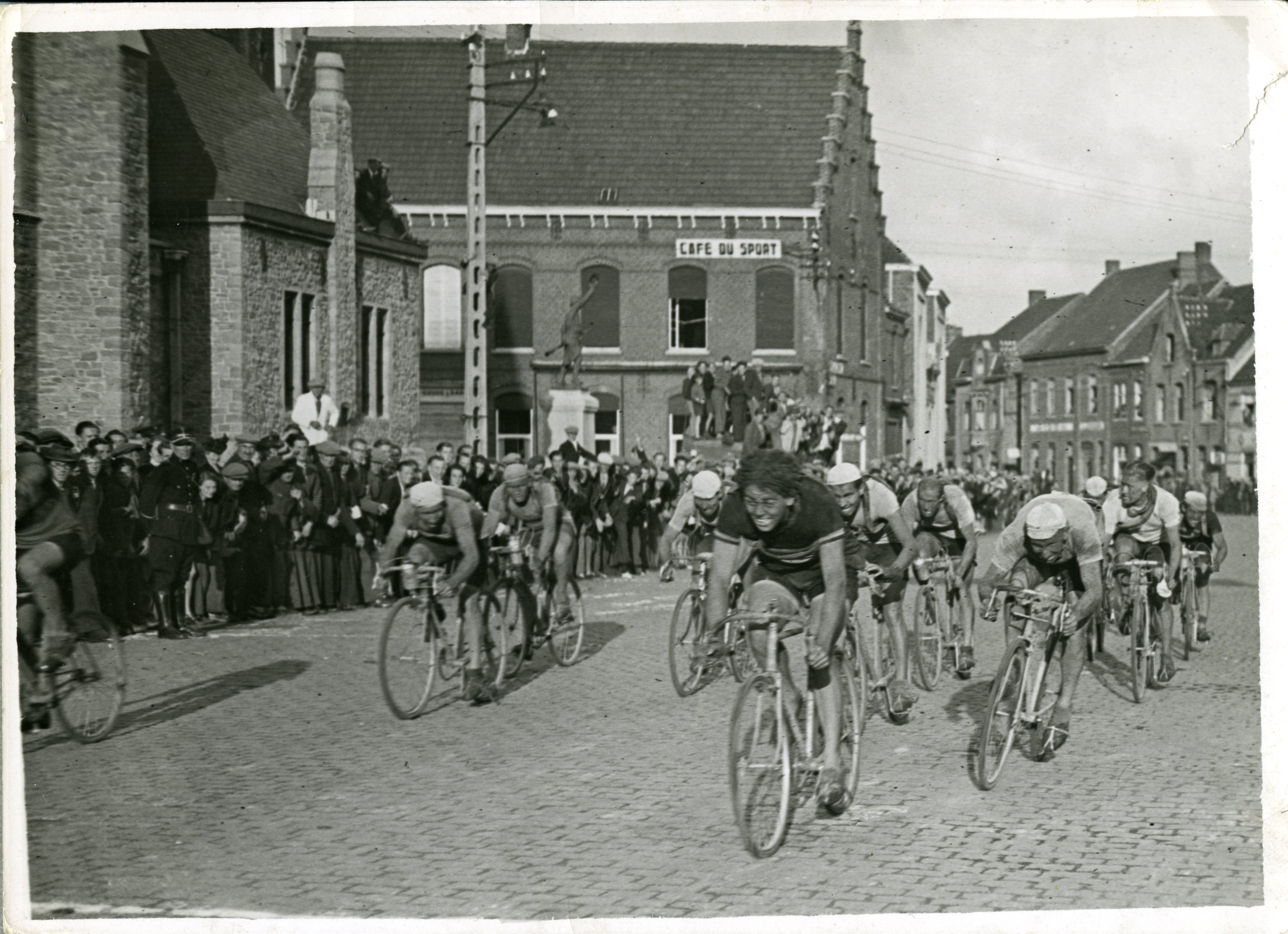
Rik Van Steenbergen winning the inaugural Dwars Door België in 1945

During his career, which lasted until 1966, Van Steenbergen won several more classics: Paris–Roubaix, Paris–Brussels and Milan–San Remo. He also won the World Road Cycling Championships three times (1949 Copenhagen, 1956 Copenhagen and 1957 Waregem), equaling the (still standing) record of Alfredo Binda. His last world title, a year after his second, was won in front of a home crowd. In addition, he placed third in the first post-war world championships in 1946. He held the Ruban Jaune for seven years for winning the 1948 Paris-Roubaix in a record average speed for a professional race, covering the 246 km at an average of 43.612 km per hour.

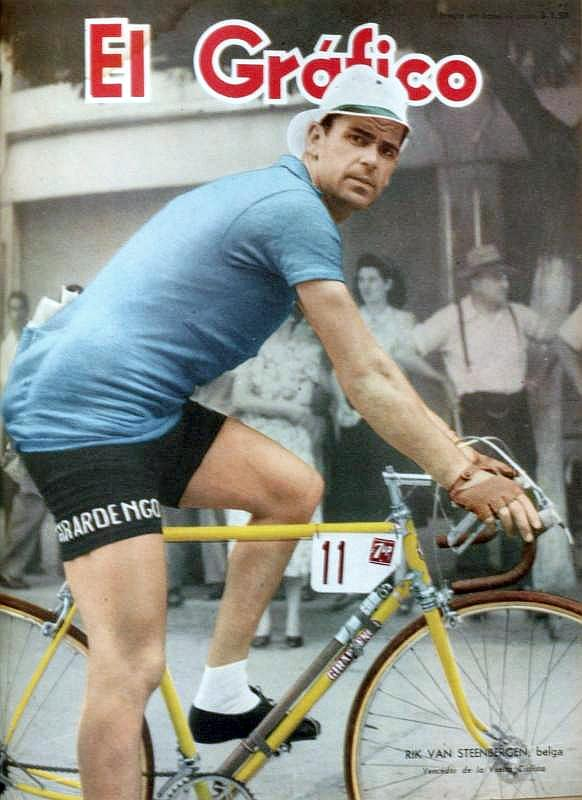
Van Steenbergen in an El Gráfico edition of 1953

His sporting achievements, combined with his physical appearance and natural authority made him a rider who was looked up to in the peloton, with or without fear. It earned him nicknames like The Boss or El Rey (the king).

"The biggest phenomenon I have encountered on my way."

— Fausto Coppi on Van Steenbergen

Van Steenbergen also excelled on the track. He won 40 Six-day events, 276 Omniums and improved two world records. His track capabilities made him an excellent road sprinter. However, due to his size, he usually had difficulty climbing, which prevented him from winning major stage races. He nevertheless placed 2nd in the 1951 Giro d'Italia. Between 1949 and 1957 he won four stages in the Tour de France and wore the yellow jersey for two days. In the same period he won fifteen stages in the Giro d'Italia and rode in the leader's pink jersey for nine days. In the Vuelta a España, he achieved six stage victories and the points classification and wore the amarillo jersey for one day. In 1951 he won the Tour of the West in France. The following year he won the Tour of Argentina. It is widely believed that he could have competed for victory in Grand Tours and other stage races had he concentrated on them, instead of racing almost every race he could enter.

Remarkable is a 48-hour spell in 1957, when Van Steenbergen raced in the Belgian Congo, Copenhagen, Paris and Liège, winning all four events.

After his career, a newspaper calculated that Van Steenbergen rode more than 1 million kilometers on a bike, the equivalent of 25 tours around the world.

In total, he won no less than 1,645 races, of which 331 road races and 1,314 track races.

== Riding style ==
The muscular Van Steenbergen was known for his sprints and final jumps at finishes.

Van Steenbergen did not allow himself to be forced into a straitjacket. Nor did he want to surround himself too much with helpers. That gave him too much responsibility to have to win.

He preferred to go his own way, like a free bird in the peloton. On the road, he single-handedly arranged what needed to be done. That usually depended on his fitness, because Van Steenbergen never knew whether he was going to ride well or not, it only became apparent in the race. In that respect, he thrived on impulses.

== Motivation ==
His motivation was cycling. Van Steenbergen enjoyed the atmosphere and competition in races and was noticed whistling on his bicycle on several occasions.

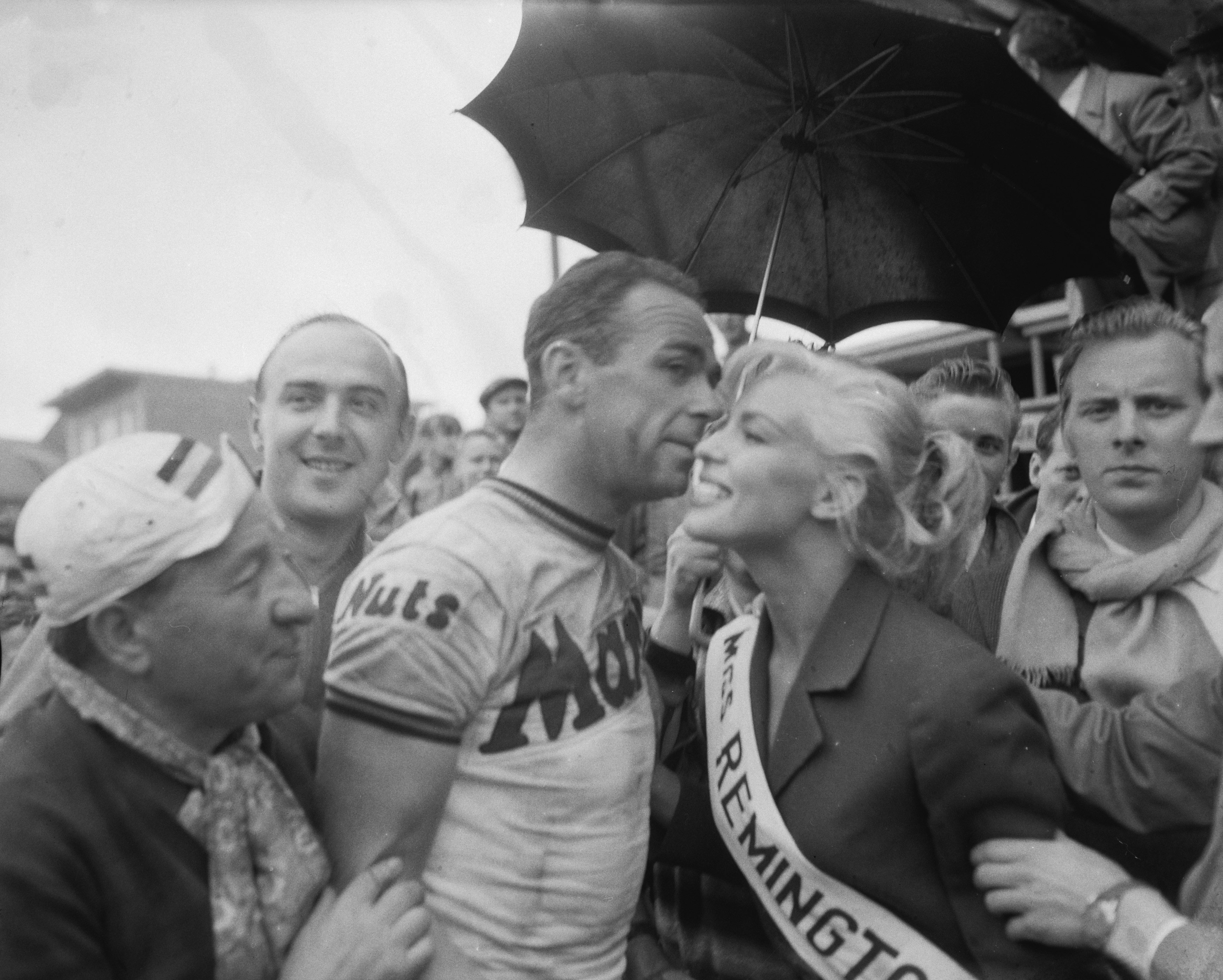
Van Steenbergen after winning a stage in the 1958 Tour of the Netherlands

Another important aspect was the money that could be earned. His background as the child of a poor family, combined with the situation in post-war Belgium undoubtedly contributed to this. After Van Steenbergen won a classic, he rode numerous other races. And only when the starting money started to decrease, he began aiming on another classic.

From 1960, he also focused more on track cycling. The bigger contracts in this sport and the stifling rivalry with Rik Van Looy were the main drivers of that conscious choice.

At the time he stopped cycling, Van Steenbergen owned several properties and flats in Belgium and Sardinia.

== Retirement ==
At the age of 42, Van Steenbergen ended his career in a packed Brussels Sports Palace.

Unprepared for the life without cycling, he entered a dark period afterwards.

"It wasn't easy to get into mainstream society when they've been kissing your shoes for twenty years." Van Steenbergen later said.

He was named in connection with many unsavory practices. He had a gambling addiction and was suspected of drug trafficking, conspiracy and incitement to debauchery. During this period, in 1968, he also starred in the Belgian adult movie Pandore as the character Dimitri. In the context of that era the film was a sensational, provocative, scandal movie, although nowadays it wouldn't be labeled as an adult movie at all.

Van Steenbergen also ended up in jail for a while. He came close to prison for smuggling a suspect package over the Dutch border. But his marriage with the British Doreen Hewitt saved him from ruin and he got his life back on track.

Despite the many side issues, he maintained his popularity among the cycling public. Later in life he became a welcome guest at sports evenings, competitions and television debates.

== Death and commemoration ==
Rik Van Steenbergen died in Antwerp after a prolonged sickness, at the age of 78. The funeral was in the Sint Pauluskerk of Westmalle, attended by about 2000 people, including Eddy Merckx, Rik Van Looy, Roger De Vlaeminck, Walter Godefroot, Johan De Muynck, Lucien Van Impe, Freddy Maertens and Briek Schotte. The UCI president Hein Verbruggen and Belgian prime minister Guy Verhofstadt also attended.

The following year, a statue was erected in his honour on the Wampenberg in Arendonk.

== Career achievements ==
=== Highlights ===
- 3 World Road Cycling Championships (1949, 1956, 1957)
- 8 major classics wins (Tour of Flanders x 2, Paris–Roubaix x 2, La Flèche Wallonne x 2, Paris–Brussels, Milan–San Remo)
- 7 Belgian Road Championships
- 4 Stage wins in the Tour de France
- 15 Stage wins in the Giro d'Italia (including second overall 1951)
- 6 Stage wins in the Vuelta a España
- 6 European Track Championships
- 40 Six Day wins
- 11 Belgian Track Championships

=== Records ===
- Record of most successful World Cycling Champion (3x gold, 1x bronze), shared with Alfredo Binda & Óscar Freire
- Most Critérium des As wins: 5 in 1948, 1952, 1955, 1957 & 1958
- Most Acht van Chaam wins: 3 in 1956, 1958, 1960 (shared record)
- Most Six Days of Brussels wins: 8 in 1948, 1949, 1951, 1955, 1956, 1958, 1960, 1962
- Most Six Days of Madrid wins: 3 in 1963, 1964, 1965
- Most track races won: 1,314 between 1939 and 1966

== Awards and honours ==
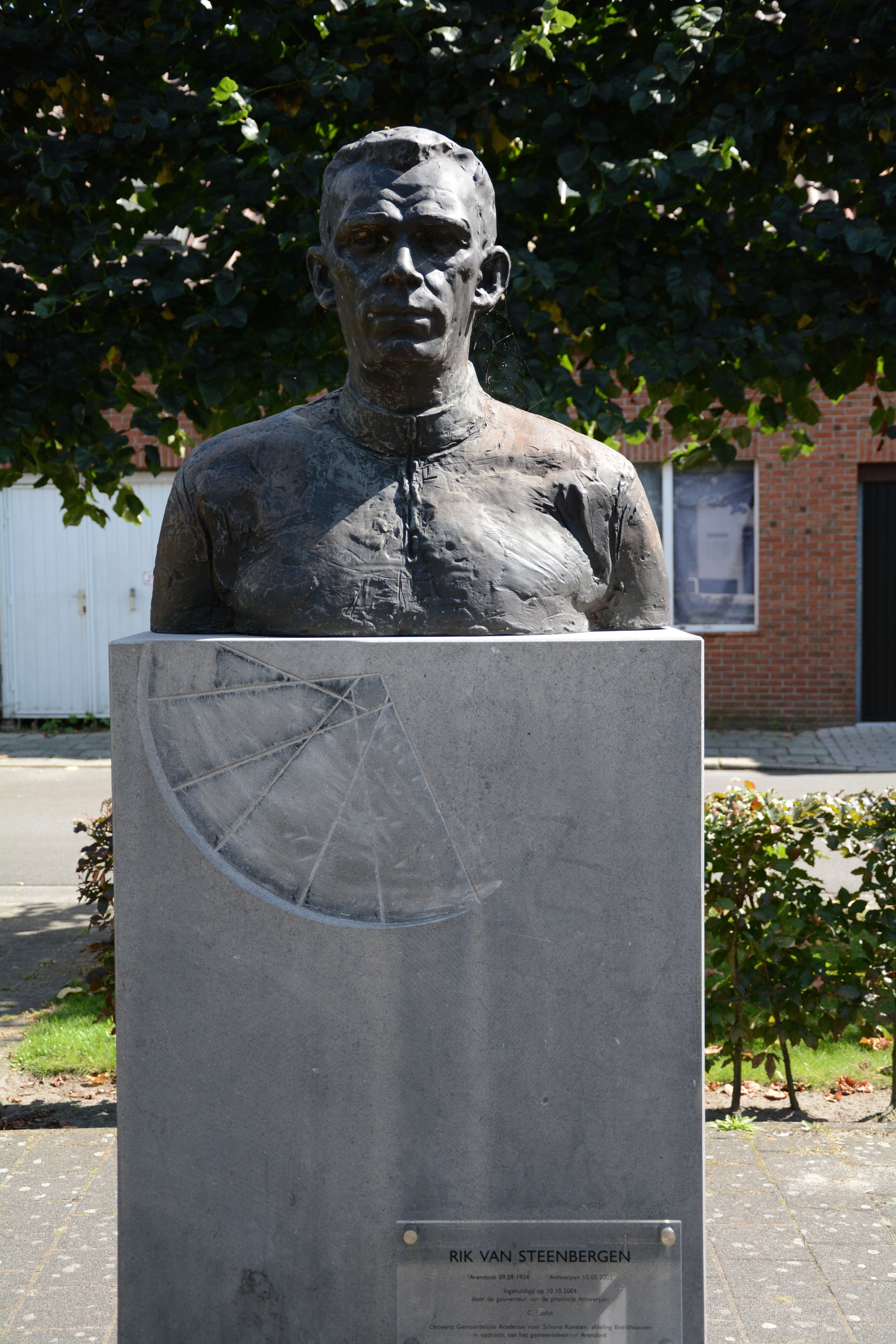
Bust of Van Steenbergen

- Ruban Jaune: 1948->1955
- Officer in the Belgian Order of Leopold II: 1957
- Best foreign rider award: 1951 Giro d'Italia
- Millionär auf Zwei Rädern, a German movie about him: 1965
- Swiss AIOCC Trophy (fr): 1967
- Medal of honour of the City of Brussels: 1967
- Bust by the KBWB: 1967
- GP Rik Van Steenbergen: from 1991
- Rik van Steenbergen Classic from 1999
- Province of Antwerp sportsman of the 20th Century: 2000
- Introduced in the UCI Hall of Fame: 2002
- Bust in Arendonk: 2004
- UCI Top 100 of All Time: 4,900 points

== Books ==
- Rik Van Steenbergen: Het kind der goden by Peter Woeti in 1957. Hidawa, 80 p. (Dutch)
- Rik van Steenbergen by Fred De Bruyne in 1963. G. Kolff, 41 p. (Dutch)
- De Miljoenenfiets van Rik Van Steenbergen by Achille Van Den Broeck in 1966. De Brauwere, 391 p. (Dutch)
- Rik I van Steenbergen by René Vermeiren, Hugo De Meyer in 1999. De Eecloonaar, 272 p. ISBN 9789074128568 (Dutch, French, English, Italian, Spanish)
- Rik I Memorial (1924 - 2003) by René Vermeiren in 2003. De Eecloonaar, 56 p. ISBN 9789074128957 (Dutch)
- Rik Van Steenbergen. Das Ass der Asse by Walter Rottiers. Bielefeld in 2005, Covadonga-Verlag, 144 p. ISBN 9783936973150 (German)

== See also ==
- Memorial Rik Van Steenbergen
