= Joseph Moerenhout =

Belgian cyclist (1910–1966)

Personal information
- Born: 10 March 1910
- Died: 27 March 1966 (aged 56)

Cycling career
- Sport: Cycling
- Discipline: Road
- Role: Rider

Joseph Moerenhout (10 March 1910 – 27 March 1966) was a Belgian racing cyclist. He rode in the 1933 Tour de France.
