= 1936 Tour de France, Stage 14a to Stage 21 =

Cycling race stages

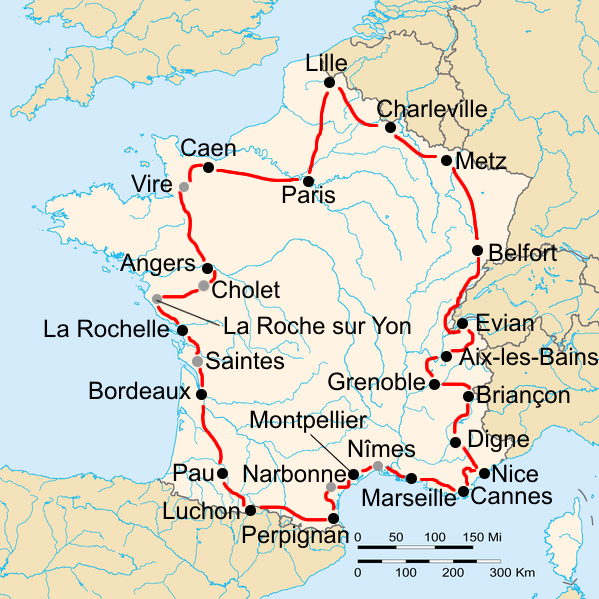
Route of the 1936 Tour de France

The 1936 Tour de France was the 30th edition of the Tour de France, one of cycling's Grand Tours. The Tour began in Paris with a flat stage on 7 July, and Stage 14a occurred on 23 July with a flat stage from Montpellier. The race finished in Paris on 2 August.

== Stage 14a ==
23 July 1936 – Montpellier to Narbonne, 103 km (64 mi)

Stage 14a result

| Rank | Rider | Team | Time |
|---|---|---|---|
| 1 | René Le Grevès (FRA) | France | 3h 25' 40" |
| 2 | Éloi Meulenberg (BEL) | Belgium | s.t. |
| 3 | Aldo Bertocco (FRA) | Touriste-routier | s.t. |
| 4 | Paul Maye (FRA) | France | s.t. |
| 5 | Louis Thiétard (FRA) | Touriste-routier | s.t. |
| 6 | Theo Middelkamp (NED) | Netherlands | s.t. |
| =7 | Sylvère Maes (BEL) | Belgium | s.t. |
| =7 | Félicien Vervaecke (BEL) | Belgium | s.t. |
| =7 | Marcel Kint (BEL) | Belgium | s.t. |
| =7 | Cyriel Van Overberghe (BEL) | Belgium | s.t. |

General classification after stage 14a

| Rank | Rider | Team | Time |
|---|---|---|---|
| 1 | Sylvère Maes (BEL) | Belgium | |
| 2 | Félicien Vervaecke (BEL) | Belgium | + 3' 33" |
| 3 | Antonin Magne (FRA) | France | + 6' 16" |
| 4 | | | |
| 5 | | | |
| 6 | | | |
| 7 | | | |
| 8 | | | |
| 9 | | | |
| 10 | | | |

== Stage 14b ==
23 July 1936 – Narbonne to Perpignan, 63 km (39 mi) (ITT)

Stage 14b result

| Rank | Rider | Team | Time |
|---|---|---|---|
| 1 | Sylvère Maes (BEL) | Belgium | 1h 35' 18" |
| 2 | Félicien Vervaecke (BEL) | Belgium | s.t. |
| 3 | François Neuville (BEL) | Belgium | s.t. |
| 4 | Marcel Kint (BEL) | Belgium | s.t. |
| 5 | Antonin Magne (FRA) | France | + 23" |
| 6 | René Le Grevès (FRA) | France | s.t. |
| 7 | Robert Tanneveau (FRA) | France | s.t. |
| 8 | Raoul Lesueur (FRA) | France | s.t. |
| 9 | Pierre Cogan (FRA) | France | s.t. |
| 10 | Arsène Mersch (LUX) | Spain/Luxembourg | + 1' 58" |

General classification after stage 14b

| Rank | Rider | Team | Time |
|---|---|---|---|
| 1 | Sylvère Maes (BEL) | Belgium | |
| 2 | Félicien Vervaecke (BEL) | Belgium | + 4' 18" |
| 3 | Antonin Magne (FRA) | France | + 8' 09" |
| 4 | | | |
| 5 | | | |
| 6 | | | |
| 7 | | | |
| 8 | | | |
| 9 | | | |
| 10 | | | |

== Rest day 4 ==
24 July 1936 – Perpignan

== Stage 15 ==
25 July 1936 – Perpignan to Luchon, 325 km (202 mi)

Stage 15 result

| Rank | Rider | Team | Time |
|---|---|---|---|
| 1 | Sauveur Ducazeaux (FRA) | Touriste-routier | 11h 57' 32" |
| 2 | Arsène Mersch (LUX) | Spain/Luxembourg | s.t. |
| 3 | Leo Amberg (SUI) | Switzerland | + 35" |
| 4 | Sylvain Marcaillou (FRA) | Touriste-routier | s.t. |
| 5 | Sylvère Maes (BEL) | Belgium | s.t. |
| 6 | Antonin Magne (FRA) | France | s.t. |
| 7 | Félicien Vervaecke (BEL) | Belgium | s.t. |
| 8 | Louis Thiétard (FRA) | Touriste-routier | + 3' 40" |
| 9 | Raoul Lesueur (FRA) | France | s.t. |
| 10 | Theo Middelkamp (NED) | Netherlands | s.t. |

General classification after stage 15

| Rank | Rider | Team | Time |
|---|---|---|---|
| 1 | Sylvère Maes (BEL) | Belgium | |
| 2 | Félicien Vervaecke (BEL) | Belgium | + 4' 18" |
| 3 | Antonin Magne (FRA) | France | + 8' 09" |
| 4 | | | |
| 5 | | | |
| 6 | | | |
| 7 | | | |
| 8 | | | |
| 9 | | | |
| 10 | | | |

== Rest day 5 ==
26 July 1936 – Luchon

== Stage 16 ==
27 July 1936 – Luchon to Pau, 194 km (121 mi)

Stage 16 result

| Rank | Rider | Team | Time |
|---|---|---|---|
| 1 | Sylvère Maes (BEL) | Belgium | 7h 12' 52" |
| 2 | Léon Level (FRA) | Touriste-routier | + 8' 39" |
| 3 | Mariano Cañardo (ESP) | Spain/Luxembourg | + 8' 55" |
| 4 | Paul Maye (FRA) | France | + 11' 54" |
| 5 | Charles Berty (FRA) | Touriste-routier | s.t. |
| 6 | Sylvain Marcaillou (FRA) | Touriste-routier | s.t. |
| 7 | Leo Amberg (SUI) | Switzerland | s.t. |
| 8 | Pierre Clemens (LUX) | Spain/Luxembourg | + 12' 01" |
| 9 | Antonin Magne (FRA) | France | + 13' 39" |
| 10 | Louis Thiétard (FRA) | Touriste-routier | + 14' 57" |

General classification after stage 16

| Rank | Rider | Team | Time |
|---|---|---|---|
| 1 | Sylvère Maes (BEL) | Belgium | |
| 2 | Antonin Magne (FRA) | France | + 26' 13" |
| 3 | Félicien Vervaecke (BEL) | Belgium | + 28' 38" |
| 4 | | | |
| 5 | | | |
| 6 | | | |
| 7 | | | |
| 8 | | | |
| 9 | | | |
| 10 | | | |

== Rest day 6 ==
28 July 1936 – Pau

== Stage 17 ==
29 July 1936 – Pau to Bordeaux, 229 km (142 mi)

Stage 17 result

| Rank | Rider | Team | Time |
|---|---|---|---|
| 1 | René Le Grevès (FRA) | France | 7h 20' 25" |
| 2 | Éloi Meulenberg (BEL) | Belgium | s.t. |
| 3 | Paul Maye (FRA) | France | s.t. |
| 4 | Aldo Bertocco (FRA) | Touriste-routier | s.t. |
| 5 | François Neuville (BEL) | Belgium | s.t. |
| 6 | Sauveur Ducazeaux (FRA) | Touriste-routier | s.t. |
| 7 | Sylvain Marcaillou (FRA) | Touriste-routier | s.t. |
| =8 | Sylvère Maes (BEL) | Belgium | s.t. |
| =8 | Félicien Vervaecke (BEL) | Belgium | s.t. |
| =8 | Marcel Kint (BEL) | Belgium | s.t. |

General classification after stage 17

| Rank | Rider | Team | Time |
|---|---|---|---|
| 1 | Sylvère Maes (BEL) | Belgium | |
| 2 | Antonin Magne (FRA) | France | + 26' 13" |
| 3 | Félicien Vervaecke (BEL) | Belgium | + 28' 38" |
| 4 | | | |
| 5 | | | |
| 6 | | | |
| 7 | | | |
| 8 | | | |
| 9 | | | |
| 10 | | | |

== Stage 18a ==
30 July 1936 – Bordeaux to Saintes, 117 km (73 mi)

Stage 18a result

| Rank | Rider | Team | Time |
|---|---|---|---|
| 1 | Éloi Meulenberg (BEL) | Belgium | 3h 30' 07" |
| 2 | René Le Grevès (FRA) | France | s.t. |
| 3 | Julián Berrendero (ESP) | Spain/Luxembourg | s.t. |
| 4 | Louis Thiétard (FRA) | Touriste-routier | s.t. |
| 5 | Leo Amberg (SUI) | Switzerland | s.t. |
| 6 | Sauveur Ducazeaux (FRA) | Touriste-routier | s.t. |
| 7 | François Neuville (BEL) | Belgium | s.t. |
| 8 | Antoon van Schendel (NED) | Netherlands | s.t. |
| 9 | Léon Level (FRA) | Touriste-routier | s.t. |
| 10 | Edmond Pagès (FRA) | Touriste-routier | s.t. |

General classification after stage 18a

| Rank | Rider | Team | Time |
|---|---|---|---|
| 1 | Sylvère Maes (BEL) | Belgium | |
| 2 | Antonin Magne (FRA) | France | + 26' 13" |
| 3 | Félicien Vervaecke (BEL) | Belgium | + 28' 38" |
| 4 | | | |
| 5 | | | |
| 6 | | | |
| 7 | | | |
| 8 | | | |
| 9 | | | |
| 10 | | | |

== Stage 18b ==
30 July 1936 – Saintes to La Rochelle, 75 km (47 mi) (ITT)

Stage 18b result

| Rank | Rider | Team | Time |
|---|---|---|---|
| 1 | Sylvère Maes (BEL) | Belgium | 1h 46' 53" |
| 2 | Félicien Vervaecke (BEL) | Belgium | s.t. |
| 3 | Marcel Kint (BEL) | Belgium | s.t. |
| 4 | Albert Hendrickx (BEL) | Belgium | s.t. |
| 5 | Antonin Magne (FRA) | France | + 20" |
| 6 | Raoul Lesueur (FRA) | France | s.t. |
| 7 | Arthur Debruyckere (FRA) | France | s.t. |
| 8 | Pierre Cogan (FRA) | France | s.t. |
| 9 | Robert Tanneveau (FRA) | France | s.t. |
| 10 | Cyriel Van Overberghe (BEL) | Belgium | + 2' 52" |

General classification after stage 18b

| Rank | Rider | Team | Time |
|---|---|---|---|
| 1 | Sylvère Maes (BEL) | Belgium | |
| 2 | Antonin Magne (FRA) | France | + 28' 03" |
| 3 | Félicien Vervaecke (BEL) | Belgium | + 29' 23" |
| 4 | | | |
| 5 | | | |
| 6 | | | |
| 7 | | | |
| 8 | | | |
| 9 | | | |
| 10 | | | |

== Stage 19a ==
31 July 1936 – La Rochelle to La Roche-sur-Yon, 81 km (50 mi)

Stage 19a result

| Rank | Rider | Team | Time |
|---|---|---|---|
| 1 | Marcel Kint (BEL) | Belgium | 2h 49' 29" |
| 2 | Louis Thiétard (FRA) | Touriste-routier | s.t. |
| 3 | Sylvain Marcaillou (FRA) | Touriste-routier | s.t. |
| 4 | Alphonse Antoine (FRA) | Touriste-routier | s.t. |
| 5 | Arsène Mersch (LUX) | Spain/Luxembourg | s.t. |
| 6 | Charles Berty (FRA) | Touriste-routier | s.t. |
| 7 | Fabien Galateau (FRA) | Touriste-routier | s.t. |
| 8 | Gabriel Dubois (FRA) | Touriste-routier | s.t. |
| 9 | Albert van Schendel (NED) | Netherlands | s.t. |
| 10 | Leo Amberg (SUI) | Switzerland | + 2' 09" |

General classification after stage 19a

| Rank | Rider | Team | Time |
|---|---|---|---|
| 1 | Sylvère Maes (BEL) | Belgium | |
| 2 | Antonin Magne (FRA) | France | + 28' 03" |
| 3 | Félicien Vervaecke (BEL) | Belgium | + 29' 23" |
| 4 | | | |
| 5 | | | |
| 6 | | | |
| 7 | | | |
| 8 | | | |
| 9 | | | |
| 10 | | | |

== Stage 19b ==
31 July 1936 – La Roche-sur-Yon to Cholet, 65 km (40 mi) (ITT)

Stage 19b result

| Rank | Rider | Team | Time |
|---|---|---|---|
| 1 | Félicien Vervaecke (BEL) | Belgium | 1h 33' 06" |
| 2 | Marcel Kint (BEL) | Belgium | s.t. |
| 3 | Sylvère Maes (BEL) | Belgium | s.t. |
| 4 | Éloi Meulenberg (BEL) | Belgium | s.t. |
| 5 | Cyriel Van Overberghe (BEL) | Belgium | s.t. |
| 6 | Albert Hendrickx (BEL) | Belgium | s.t. |
| 7 | François Neuville (BEL) | Belgium | s.t. |
| 8 | Theo Middelkamp (NED) | Netherlands | + 1' 24" |
| 9 | Albert van Schendel (NED) | Netherlands | s.t. |
| 10 | Arsène Mersch (LUX) | Spain/Luxembourg | s.t. |

General classification after stage 19b

| Rank | Rider | Team | Time |
|---|---|---|---|
| 1 | Sylvère Maes (BEL) | Belgium | |
| 2 | Félicien Vervaecke (BEL) | Belgium | + 27' 53" |
| 3 | Antonin Magne (FRA) | France | + 29' 29" |
| 4 | | | |
| 5 | | | |
| 6 | | | |
| 7 | | | |
| 8 | | | |
| 9 | | | |
| 10 | | | |

== Stage 19c ==
31 July 1936 – Cholet to Angers, 67 km (42 mi) (ITT)

Stage 19c result

| Rank | Rider | Team | Time |
|---|---|---|---|
| 1 | Paul Maye (FRA) | France | 1h 38' 30" |
| 2 | Sauveur Ducazeaux (FRA) | Touriste-routier | s.t. |
| 3 | Mathias Clemens (LUX) | Spain/Luxembourg | s.t. |
| 4 | Raoul Lesueur (FRA) | France | s.t. |
| 5 | Leo Amberg (SUI) | Switzerland | s.t. |
| 6 | Fernand Lemay (FRA) | Touriste-routier | s.t. |
| 7 | René Le Grevès (FRA) | France | + 3' 53" |
| 8 | Éloi Meulenberg (BEL) | Belgium | s.t. |
| 9 | Aldo Bertocco (FRA) | Touriste-routier | s.t. |
| 10 | Mariano Cañardo (ESP) | Spain/Luxembourg | + 4' 14" |

General classification after stage 19c

| Rank | Rider | Team | Time |
|---|---|---|---|
| 1 | Sylvère Maes (BEL) | Belgium | |
| 2 | Félicien Vervaecke (BEL) | Belgium | + 27' 53" |
| 3 | Antonin Magne (FRA) | France | + 29' 29" |
| 4 | | | |
| 5 | | | |
| 6 | | | |
| 7 | | | |
| 8 | | | |
| 9 | | | |
| 10 | | | |

== Stage 20a ==
1 August 1936 – Angers to Vire, 204 km (127 mi)

Stage 20a result

| Rank | Rider | Team | Time |
|---|---|---|---|
| 1 | René Le Grevès (FRA) | France | 7h 38' 20" |
| 2 | Louis Thiétard (FRA) | Touriste-routier | s.t. |
| 3 | Aldo Bertocco (FRA) | Touriste-routier | s.t. |
| 4 | Sauveur Ducazeaux (FRA) | Touriste-routier | s.t. |
| 5 | Sylvain Marcaillou (FRA) | Touriste-routier | s.t. |
| 6 | François Neuville (BEL) | Belgium | s.t. |
| =7 | Sylvère Maes (BEL) | Belgium | s.t. |
| =7 | Félicien Vervaecke (BEL) | Belgium | s.t. |
| =7 | Éloi Meulenberg (BEL) | Belgium | s.t. |
| =7 | Marcel Kint (BEL) | Belgium | s.t. |

General classification after stage 20a

| Rank | Rider | Team | Time |
|---|---|---|---|
| 1 | Sylvère Maes (BEL) | Belgium | |
| 2 | Félicien Vervaecke (BEL) | Belgium | + 27' 53" |
| 3 | Antonin Magne (FRA) | France | + 29' 29" |
| 4 | | | |
| 5 | | | |
| 6 | | | |
| 7 | | | |
| 8 | | | |
| 9 | | | |
| 10 | | | |

== Stage 20b ==
1 August 1936 – Vire to Caen, 55 km (34 mi) (ITT)

Stage 20b result

| Rank | Rider | Team | Time |
|---|---|---|---|
| 1 | Antonin Magne (FRA) | France | 1h 18' 16" |
| 2 | Pierre Cogan (FRA) | France | s.t. |
| 3 | René Le Grevès (FRA) | France | s.t. |
| 4 | Raoul Lesueur (FRA) | France | s.t. |
| 5 | Robert Tanneveau (FRA) | France | s.t. |
| 6 | Félicien Vervaecke (BEL) | Belgium | + 1' 04" |
| 7 | Marcel Kint (BEL) | Belgium | s.t. |
| 8 | Sylvère Maes (BEL) | Belgium | s.t. |
| 9 | Albert Hendrickx (BEL) | Belgium | s.t. |
| 10 | Theo Middelkamp (NED) | Netherlands | + 2' 44" |

General classification after stage 20b

| Rank | Rider | Team | Time |
|---|---|---|---|
| 1 | Sylvère Maes (BEL) | Belgium | |
| 2 | Antonin Magne (FRA) | France | + 26' 55" |
| 3 | Félicien Vervaecke (BEL) | Belgium | + 27' 53" |
| 4 | | | |
| 5 | | | |
| 6 | | | |
| 7 | | | |
| 8 | | | |
| 9 | | | |
| 10 | | | |

== Stage 21 ==
2 August 1936 – Caen to Paris, 234 km (145 mi)

Stage 21 result

| Rank | Rider | Team | Time |
|---|---|---|---|
| 1 | Arsène Mersch (LUX) | Spain/Luxembourg | 7h 07' 50" |
| 2 | Pierre Clemens (LUX) | Spain/Luxembourg | + 32" |
| 3 | Mariano Cañardo (ESP) | Spain/Luxembourg | + 48" |
| 4 | Sylvain Marcaillou (FRA) | Touriste-routier | + 1' 00" |
| 5 | Éloi Meulenberg (BEL) | Belgium | + 1' 16" |
| 6 | Raoul Lesueur (FRA) | France | s.t. |
| 7 | Louis Thiétard (FRA) | Touriste-routier | s.t. |
| 8 | Robert Tanneveau (FRA) | France | s.t. |
| 9 | Pierre Cogan (FRA) | France | s.t. |
| 10 | Antonin Magne (FRA) | France | s.t. |

General classification after stage 21

| Rank | Rider | Team | Time |
|---|---|---|---|
| 1 | Sylvère Maes (BEL) | Belgium | 142h 47' 32" |
| 2 | Antonin Magne (FRA) | France | + 26' 55" |
| 3 | Félicien Vervaecke (BEL) | Belgium | + 27' 53" |
| 4 | Pierre Clemens (LUX) | Spain/Luxembourg | + 42' 42" |
| 5 | Arsène Mersch (LUX) | Spain/Luxembourg | + 52' 52" |
| 6 | Mariano Cañardo (ESP) | Spain/Luxembourg | + 1h 03' 04" |
| 7 | Mathias Clemens (LUX) | Spain/Luxembourg | + 1h 10' 44" |
| 8 | Leo Amberg (SUI) | Switzerland | + 1h 19' 13" |
| 9 | Marcel Kint (BEL) | Belgium | + 1h 22' 25" |
| 10 | Léon Level (FRA) | Touriste-routier | + 1h 27' 57" |
