= 1936 Tour de France, Stage 1 to Stage 13b =

Cycling race stages

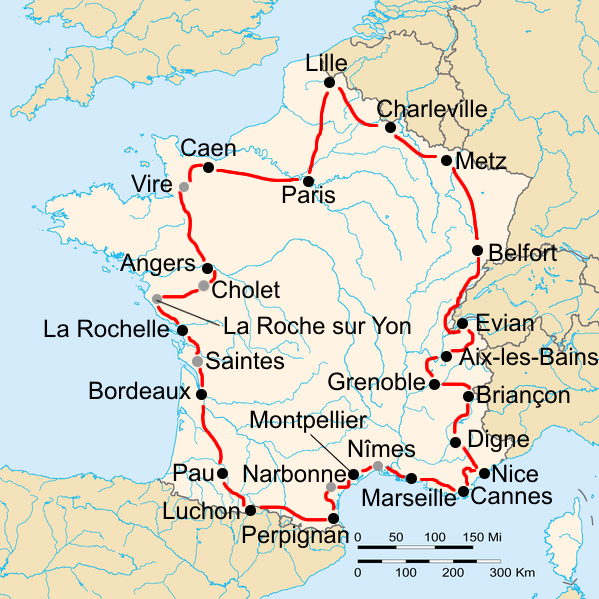
Route of the 1936 Tour de France

The 1936 Tour de France was the 30th edition of the Tour de France, one of cycling's Grand Tours. The Tour began in Paris with a flat stage on 7 July, and Stage 13b occurred on 22 July with an individual time trial to Montpellier. The race finished in Paris on 2 August.

== Stage 1 ==
7 July 1936 – Paris to Lille, 258 km (160 mi)

Stage 1 result and general classification after stage 1

Rank	Rider	Team	Time
1	Paul Egli (SUI)	Switzerland	7h 06' 18"
2	Maurice Archambaud (FRA)	France	s.t.
3	Décimo Bettini (FRA)	Touriste-routier	+ 5"
4	Gustave Danneels (BEL)	Belgium	+ 57"
5	Max Bulla (AUT)	Austria	+ 1' 07"
6	Erich Bautz (GER)	Germany	s.t.
=7	Pierre Cloarec (FRA)	Touriste-routier	+ 1' 14"
=7	Sylvain Marcaillou (FRA)	Touriste-routier	s.t.
=7	Arsène Mersch (LUX)	Spain/Luxembourg	s.t.
=7	Mariano Cañardo (ESP)	Spain/Luxembourg	s.t.

== Stage 2 ==
8 July 1936 – Lille to Charleville, 192 km (119 mi)

Stage 2 result

Rank	Rider	Team	Time
1	Robert Wierinckx (BEL)	Belgium	5h 32' 21"
2	Robert Tanneveau (FRA)	France	s.t.
3	Albert van Schendel (NED)	Netherlands	+ 23"
4	Paul Maye (FRA)	France	+ 36"
5	Gustave Danneels (BEL)	Belgium	s.t.
6	René Le Grevès (FRA)	France	s.t.
7	Amédée Fournier (FRA)	Touriste-routier	s.t.
8	Romain Maes (BEL)	Belgium	s.t.
9	Albert Hendrickx (BEL)	Belgium	s.t.
10	Sylvère Maes (BEL)	Belgium	s.t.

General classification after stage 2

Rank	Rider	Team	Time
1	Maurice Archambaud (FRA)	France	
2	Décimo Bettini (FRA)	Touriste-routier	+ 50"
3	Gustave Danneels (BEL)	Belgium	+ 1' 42"
4			
5			
6			
7			
8			
9			
10			

== Stage 3 ==
9 July 1936 – Charleville to Metz, 161 km (100 mi)

Stage 3 result

Rank	Rider	Team	Time
1	Mathias Clemens (LUX)	Spain/Luxembourg	4h 22' 22"
2	François Neuville (BEL)	Belgium	+ 35"
3	Alphonse Antoine (FRA)	Touriste-routier	s.t.
4	Paul Egli (SUI)	Switzerland	s.t.
5	Arsène Mersch (LUX)	Spain/Luxembourg	s.t.
6	Yvan Marie (FRA)	Touriste-routier	s.t.
7	Fédérico Ezquerra (ESP)	Spain/Luxembourg	+ 1' 58"
8	Bruno Roth (GER)	Germany	+ 2' 00"
9	Paul Maye (FRA)	France	+ 2' 05"
10	Robert Wierinckx (BEL)	Belgium	s.t.

General classification after stage 3

Rank	Rider	Team	Time
1	Arsène Mersch (LUX)	Spain/Luxembourg	
2	Yvan Marie (FRA)	Touriste-routier	+ 31"
3	Maurice Archambaud (FRA)	France	+ 57"
4			
5			
6			
7			
8			
9			
10			

== Stage 4 ==
10 July 1936 – Metz to Belfort, 220 km (140 mi)

Stage 4 result

Rank	Rider	Team	Time
1	Maurice Archambaud (FRA)	France	6h 50' 26"
2	Fédérico Ezquerra (ESP)	Spain/Luxembourg	s.t.
3	François Neuville (BEL)	Belgium	+ 18"
4	Antonin Magne (FRA)	France	s.t.
5	Leo Amberg (SUI)	Switzerland	s.t.
6	Mathias Clemens (LUX)	Spain/Luxembourg	s.t.
7	Marcel Kint (BEL)	Belgium	s.t.
8	Sylvère Maes (BEL)	Belgium	s.t.
9	Gustave Danneels (BEL)	Belgium	+ 47"
10	Pierre Clemens (LUX)	Spain/Luxembourg	+ 57"

General classification after stage 4

Rank	Rider	Team	Time
1	Maurice Archambaud (FRA)	France	
2	Arsène Mersch (LUX)	Spain/Luxembourg	+ 1' 49"
3	Sylvère Maes (BEL)	Belgium	+ 3' 37"
4			
5			
6			
7			
8			
9			
10			

== Stage 5 ==
11 July 1936 – Belfort to Evian, 298 km (185 mi)

Stage 5 result

Rank	Rider	Team	Time
1	René Le Grevès (FRA)	France	9h 33' 45"
2	Robert Wierinckx (BEL)	Belgium	s.t.
3	Gustave Danneels (BEL)	Belgium	s.t.
4	Aldo Bertocco (FRA)	Touriste-routier	s.t.
5	Georges Speicher (FRA)	France	s.t.
=6	Romain Maes (BEL)	Belgium	s.t.
=6	Sylvère Maes (BEL)	Belgium	s.t.
=6	Félicien Vervaecke (BEL)	Belgium	s.t.
=6	Marcel Kint (BEL)	Belgium	s.t.
=6	Albert Hendrickx (BEL)	Belgium	s.t.

General classification after stage 5

Rank	Rider	Team	Time
1	Maurice Archambaud (FRA)	France	
2	Sylvère Maes (BEL)	Belgium	+ 3' 37"
3	Robert Wierinckx (BEL)	Belgium	+ 3' 44"
4			
5			
6			
7			
8			
9			
10			

== Rest day 1 ==
12 July 1936 – Evian

== Stage 6 ==
13 July 1936 – Evian to Aix-les-Bains, 212 km (132 mi)

Stage 6 result

Rank	Rider	Team	Time
1	Éloi Meulenberg (BEL)	Belgium	6h 24' 51"
2	Antonin Magne (FRA)	France	s.t.
3	Arsène Mersch (LUX)	Spain/Luxembourg	s.t.
4	François Neuville (BEL)	Belgium	s.t.
5	Albert van Schendel (NED)	Netherlands	s.t.
6	Maurice Archambaud (FRA)	France	s.t.
=7	Sylvère Maes (BEL)	Belgium	s.t.
=7	Félicien Vervaecke (BEL)	Belgium	s.t.
=7	Robert Wierinckx (BEL)	Belgium	s.t.
=7	Mariano Cañardo (ESP)	Spain/Luxembourg	s.t.

General classification after stage 6

Rank	Rider	Team	Time
1	Maurice Archambaud (FRA)	France	
2	Sylvère Maes (BEL)	Belgium	+ 3' 37"
3	Robert Wierinckx (BEL)	Belgium	+ 3' 44"
4			
5			
6			
7			
8			
9			
10			

== Stage 7 ==
14 July 1936 – Aix-les-Bains to Grenoble, 230 km (140 mi)

Stage 7 result

Rank	Rider	Team	Time
1	Theo Middelkamp (NED)	Netherlands	8h 32' 02"
2	Maurice Archambaud (FRA)	France	s.t.
3	Léon Level (FRA)	Touriste-routier	s.t.
4	Charles Berty (FRA)	Touriste-routier	s.t.
5	Mathias Clemens (LUX)	Spain/Luxembourg	s.t.
6	Jean-Marie Goasmat (FRA)	Touriste-routier	s.t.
7	Sylvère Maes (BEL)	Belgium	s.t.
8	Pierre Clemens (LUX)	Spain/Luxembourg	s.t.
9	Julián Berrendero (ESP)	Spain/Luxembourg	s.t.
10	Fédérico Ezquerra (ESP)	Spain/Luxembourg	s.t.

General classification after stage 7

Rank	Rider	Team	Time
1	Maurice Archambaud (FRA)	France	
2	Sylvère Maes (BEL)	Belgium	+ 4' 22"
3	Pierre Clemens (LUX)	Spain/Luxembourg	+ 5' 32"
4			
5			
6			
7			
8			
9			
10			

== Stage 8 ==
15 July 1936 – Grenoble to Briançon, 194 km (121 mi)

Stage 8 result

Rank	Rider	Team	Time
1	Jean-Marie Goasmat (FRA)	Touriste-routier	6h 15' 32"
2	Pierre Cloarec (FRA)	Touriste-routier	+ 4' 06"
3	Arsène Mersch (LUX)	Spain/Luxembourg	+ 6' 21"
4	Antonin Magne (FRA)	France	s.t.
5	Yvan Marie (FRA)	Touriste-routier	s.t.
6	Sylvain Marcaillou (FRA)	Touriste-routier	s.t.
7	Sylvère Maes (BEL)	Belgium	s.t.
8	Pierre Clemens (LUX)	Spain/Luxembourg	s.t.
9	Mathias Clemens (LUX)	Spain/Luxembourg	s.t.
10	Mariano Cañardo (ESP)	Spain/Luxembourg	s.t.

General classification after stage 8

Rank	Rider	Team	Time
1	Sylvère Maes (BEL)	Belgium	
2	Pierre Clemens (LUX)	Spain/Luxembourg	+ 1' 10"
3	Antonin Magne (FRA)	France	+ 1' 35"
4			
5			
6			
7			
8			
9			
10			

== Stage 9 ==
16 July 1936 – Briançon to Digne, 220 km (140 mi)

Stage 9 result

Rank	Rider	Team	Time
1	Léon Level (FRA)	Touriste-routier	8h 06' 15"
2	Louis Thiétard (FRA)	Touriste-routier	s.t.
3	Mariano Cañardo (ESP)	Spain/Luxembourg	s.t.
4	Sylvère Maes (BEL)	Belgium	s.t.
5	Pierre Clemens (LUX)	Spain/Luxembourg	s.t.
6	Félicien Vervaecke (BEL)	Belgium	s.t.
7	Julián Berrendero (ESP)	Spain/Luxembourg	s.t.
8	Antonin Magne (FRA)	France	+ 57"
9	Marcel Kint (BEL)	Belgium	+ 1' 53"
10	Aldo Bertocco (FRA)	Touriste-routier	+ 7' 07"

General classification after stage 9

Rank	Rider	Team	Time
1	Sylvère Maes (BEL)	Belgium	
2	Pierre Clemens (LUX)	Spain/Luxembourg	+ 1' 10"
3	Antonin Magne (FRA)	France	+ 2' 32"
4			
5			
6			
7			
8			
9			
10			

== Rest day 2 ==
17 July 1936 – Digne

== Stage 10 ==
18 July 1936 – Digne to Nice, 156 km (97 mi)

Stage 10 result

Rank	Rider	Team	Time
1	Paul Maye (FRA)	France	4h 44' 16"
2	Theo Heimann (SUI)	Switzerland	s.t.
3	Albert Hendrickx (BEL)	Belgium	s.t.
4	René Le Grevès (FRA)	France	+ 3' 33"
5	Sauveur Ducazeaux (FRA)	Touriste-routier	s.t.
6	Robert Wierinckx (BEL)	Belgium	s.t.
7	Alphonse Antoine (FRA)	Touriste-routier	s.t.
8	Arsène Mersch (LUX)	Spain/Luxembourg	s.t.
=9	Sylvère Maes (BEL)	Belgium	s.t.
=9	Félicien Vervaecke (BEL)	Belgium	s.t.

General classification after stage 10

Rank	Rider	Team	Time
1	Sylvère Maes (BEL)	Belgium	
2	Pierre Clemens (LUX)	Spain/Luxembourg	+ 1' 12"
3	Antonin Magne (FRA)	France	+ 2' 34"
4			
5			
6			
7			
8			
9			
10			

== Stage 11 ==
19 July 1936 – Nice to Cannes, 126 km (78 mi)

Stage 11 result

Rank	Rider	Team	Time
1	Fédérico Ezquerra (ESP)	Spain/Luxembourg	4h 03' 18"
2	Sylvère Maes (BEL)	Belgium	+ 1' 46"
3	Félicien Vervaecke (BEL)	Belgium	s.t.
4	Antonin Magne (FRA)	France	+ 2' 16"
5	Pierre Cogan (FRA)	France	+ 2' 21"
6	Louis Thiétard (FRA)	Touriste-routier	+ 2' 27"
7	Mariano Cañardo (ESP)	Spain/Luxembourg	+ 3' 51"
8	Sylvain Marcaillou (FRA)	Touriste-routier	s.t.
9	Aldo Bertocco (FRA)	Touriste-routier	+ 6' 10"
10	Leo Amberg (SUI)	Switzerland	s.t.

General classification after stage 11

Rank	Rider	Team	Time
1	Sylvère Maes (BEL)	Belgium	
2	Félicien Vervaecke (BEL)	Belgium	+ 2' 48"
3	Antonin Magne (FRA)	France	+ 3' 49"
4			
5			
6			
7			
8			
9			
10			

== Rest day 3 ==
20 July 1936 – Cannes

== Stage 12 ==
21 July 1936 – Cannes to Marseille, 195 km (121 mi)

Stage 12 result

Rank	Rider	Team	Time
1	René Le Grevès (FRA)	France	6h 36' 10"
2	Éloi Meulenberg (BEL)	Belgium	s.t.
3	Marcel Kint (BEL)	Belgium	s.t.
4	François Neuville (BEL)	Belgium	s.t.
5	Sylvain Marcaillou (FRA)	Touriste-routier	s.t.
6	Antonin Magne (FRA)	France	s.t.
7	Theo Heimann (SUI)	Switzerland	s.t.
8	Louis Thiétard (FRA)	Touriste-routier	s.t.
=9	Sylvère Maes (BEL)	Belgium	s.t.
=9	Félicien Vervaecke (BEL)	Belgium	s.t.

General classification after stage 12

Rank	Rider	Team	Time
1	Sylvère Maes (BEL)	Belgium	
2	Félicien Vervaecke (BEL)	Belgium	+ 2' 48"
3	Antonin Magne (FRA)	France	+ 3' 49"
4			
5			
6			
7			
8			
9			
10			

== Stage 13a ==
22 July 1936 – Marseille to Nîmes, 112 km (70 mi)

Stage 13a result

Rank	Rider	Team	Time
1	René Le Grevès (FRA)	France	4h 12' 15"
2	Éloi Meulenberg (BEL)	Belgium	s.t.
3	Paul Maye (FRA)	France	s.t.
4	Louis Thiétard (FRA)	Touriste-routier	s.t.
5	Sylvain Marcaillou (FRA)	Touriste-routier	s.t.
6	Theo Middelkamp (NED)	Netherlands	s.t.
7	Sauveur Ducazeaux (FRA)	Touriste-routier	s.t.
=8	Sylvère Maes (BEL)	Belgium	s.t.
=8	Félicien Vervaecke (BEL)	Belgium	s.t.
=8	Marcel Kint (BEL)	Belgium	s.t.

General classification after stage 13a

Rank	Rider	Team	Time
1	Sylvère Maes (BEL)	Belgium	
2	Félicien Vervaecke (BEL)	Belgium	+ 2' 48"
3	Antonin Magne (FRA)	France	+ 3' 49"
4			
5			
6			
7			
8			
9			
10			

== Stage 13b ==
22 July 1936 – Nîmes to Montpellier, 52 km (32 mi) (ITT)

Stage 13b result

Rank	Rider	Team	Time
1	Sylvère Maes (BEL)	Belgium	1h 09' 31"
2	Félicien Vervaecke (BEL)	Belgium	s.t.
3	Albert Hendrickx (BEL)	Belgium	s.t.
4	Marcel Kint (BEL)	Belgium	s.t.
5	François Neuville (BEL)	Belgium	s.t.
6	Cyriel Van Overberghe (BEL)	Belgium	s.t.
7	Antonin Magne (FRA)	France	+ 57"
8	René Le Grevès (FRA)	France	s.t.
9	Raoul Lesueur (FRA)	France	s.t.
10	Paul Maye (FRA)	France	s.t.

General classification after stage 13b

Rank	Rider	Team	Time
1	Sylvère Maes (BEL)	Belgium	
2	Félicien Vervaecke (BEL)	Belgium	+ 3' 35"
3	Antonin Magne (FRA)	France	+ 6' 16"
4			
5			
6			
7			
8			
9			
10			
