= Critérium International =

French multi-day road cycling race

Race details
- Date: Late March
- Region: South of France (1961–2000); Ardennes, France (2001–2009); Corsica, France (2010–2016)
- English name: International Criterium
- Local name: Critérium International (in French)
- Discipline: Road
- Competition: UCI Europe Tour
- Type: Stage race
- Organiser: Amaury Sport Organisation
- Web site: www.letour.fr/indexCRI_us.html

History
- First edition: 1932
- Editions: 85 (as of 2016)
- Final edition: 2016
- First winner: Léon Le Calvez (FRA)
- Most wins: Émile Idée (FRA); Raymond Poulidor (FRA); Jens Voigt (GER) 5 wins
- Final winner: Thibaut Pinot (FRA)

The Critérium International was a two-day bicycle stage race held in France every spring from 1932 until 2016, typically the last weekend of March. It was formerly known as the Critérium National de la Route, first run in 1932. For many years it was considered a sort of French national championship and was finally opened to non–French cyclists in 1979. Bernard Hinault is the only cyclist to win the race in both its forms. The race was won by some of the most famous names in cycling, including Jacques Anquetil, Sean Kelly, Bernard Hinault, Miguel Induráin, Stephen Roche, Joop Zoetemelk, Laurent Fignon, Jens Voigt, Cadel Evans and Chris Froome.

== History and route ==
The Critérium International was one of the few races in cycling, apart from the three Grand Tours, with no fixed attachment to a region. Upon its creation in 1932, it was held as a one-day race in the Vallée de Chevreuse, finishing in the Parc des Princes velodrome in Paris. From 1941 to 1943, two races were organized each year: one in Nazi-occupied France and one in the free French State. Starting with the 1959 race, the race location changed every year. The edition of 1960 took place in Oran in French Algeria. From 1963 to 1966 the Critérium was held as a stage race for the first time, and again ever since 1978.

From 2001 to 2009 the race was organized in the Ardennes with all stages starting and finishing in or around Charleville-Mézières. In 2010 the race moved to the island of Corsica, around the coastal city of Porto-Vecchio. In 2014 the ASO agreed a deal to extend the race's stay until at least 2016. Because of its challenging route and usually mild weather conditions in early spring, the Critérium International was often contended by many general classification riders in their build-up towards the Grand Tours, notably the Tour de France.

On November 18, 2016, the ASO announced that it would no longer organise the two-day event, ending its 85-year run. The race was considered to have been overshadowed by events taking place on the same weekend – namely Gent–Wevelgem and Volta a Catalunya.

=== 1997 horse incident ===
In 1997, a horse jumped over a fence and joined the peloton, eventually passing it, leaving the race only 20 km from the finish line. This scene was shown briefly in the movie Amélie, and is often mistaken for a scene from a Tour de France race.

== Winners ==
Year	Winner	Second	Third
Critérium National de la Route
1932	(France) Léon Le Calvez	(France) Pierre Magne	(France) Maurice Archambaud
1933	(France) André Leducq	(France) Georges Speicher	(France) Jean Bidot
1934	(France) Roger Lapébie	(France) Jules Merviel	(France) René Le Grevès
1935	(France) René Le Grevès	(France) René Vietto	(France) Antonin Magne
1936	(France) Paul Chocque	(France) Fernand Mithouard	(France) Arthur Debruyckere
1937	(France) Roger Lapébie and (France) René Le Grevès		(France) Pierre Cloarec
1938	(France) Pierre Jaminet	(France) Pierre Cloarec	(France) Sauveur Ducazeaux
1939	(France) André Deforge	(France) Marcel Laurent	(France) Pierre Jaminet
1940	(France) Émile Idée	(France) André Desmoulins	(France) André Deforge
1941	(France) Yvan Marie	(France) André Desmoulins	(France) Albert Goutal
1941	(France) Benoît Faure	(France) Pierre Cogan	(France) Aldo Bertocco
1942	(France) Émile Idée	(France) Raymond Louviot	(France) Raymond Guégan
1942	(France) Aldo Bertocco	(France) Joseph Soffietti	(France) Marcel Laurent
1943	(France) Émile Idée	(France) Georges Blum	(France) Raymond Guégan
1943	(France) Louis Gauthier	(France) Émile Rol	(France) André Deforge
1944	(France) Roger Piel	(France) Louis Thiétard	(France) Aimable Denhez
1945	(France) Jo Goutorbe	(France) Manuel Huguet	(France) Émile Idée
1946	(France) Kleber Piot and (France) Camille Danguillaume		(France) Lucien Boda
1947	(France) Émile Idée	(France) Emile Carrara	(France) Urbain Caffi
1948	(France) Camille Danguillaume	(France) Émile Idée	(France) Victor Pernac
1949	(France) Émile Idée	(France) Raymond Lucas	(France) Antonin Rolland
1950	(France) Pierre Barbotin	(France) Guy Lapebie	(France) Louis Déprez
1951	(France) Louison Bobet	(France) Pierre Barbotin	(France) Robert Desbats
1952	(France) Louison Bobet	(France) Robert Varnajo	(France) Bernard Gauthier
1953	(France) Robert Desbats	(France) Jacques Dupont	(France) Gilbert Loof
1954	(France) Roger Hassenforder	(France) Raoul Rémy	(France) Bernard Gauthier
1955	(France) René Privat	(France) Pierre Molineris	(France) Bernard Gauthier
1956	(France) Roger Hassenforder	(France) Louis Caput	(France) Jean Forestier
1957	(France) Jean Forestier	(France) Louison Bobet	(France) Serge Blusson
1958	(France) Roger Hassenforder	(France) Raphaël Géminiani	(France) Claude Colette
1959	(France) André Darrigade	(France) Fernand Picot	(France) Jean Graczyk
1960	(France) Jean Graczyk	(France) Claude Colette	(France) Jacques Anquetil
1961	(France) Jacques Anquetil	(France) André Darrigade	(France) Jean Gainche
1962	(France) Joseph Groussard	(France) Jean-Claude Annaert	(France) Anatole Novak
1963	(France) Jacques Anquetil	(France) Raymond Poulidor	(France) Joseph Velly
1964	(France) Raymond Poulidor	(France) Edouard Delberghe	(France) Joseph Novales
1965	(France) Jacques Anquetil	(France) Raymond Poulidor	(France) Jean-Claude Annaert
1966	(France) Raymond Poulidor	(France) Roger Pingeon	(France) Jean-Claude Lebaube
1967	(France) Jacques Anquetil	(France) Raymond Poulidor	(France) Raymond Delisle
1968	(France) Raymond Poulidor	(France) Jean Jourden	(France) Roger Pingeon
1969	(France) Gilbert Bellone	(France) Raymond Delisle	(France) Georges Chappe
1970	(France) Georges Chappe	(France) Lucien Aimar	(France) Roland Berland
1971	(France) Raymond Poulidor	(France) Gilbert Bellone	(France) Daniel Ducreux
1972	(France) Raymond Poulidor	(France) Alain Santy	(France) Jean-Luc Molinéris
1973	(France) Jean-Pierre Danguillaume	(France) Alain Santy	(France) André Mollet
1974	(France) Bernard Thévenet	(France) Christian Raymond	(France) Raymond Delisle
1975	(France) Jacques Esclassan	(France) André Corbeau	(France) Jean Chassang
1976	(France) Patrick Béon	(France) Yves Hézard	(France) Raymond Martin
1977	(France) Jean Chassang	(France) Raymond Delisle	(France) Roland Berland
1978	(France) Bernard Hinault	(France) Michel Laurent	(France) Yves Hézard
Critérium International
1979	(Netherlands) Joop Zoetemelk	(France) Bernard Hinault	(Sweden) Sven-Åke Nilsson
1980	(France) Michel Laurent	(France) Jean-René Bernaudeau	(France) Régis Ovion
1981	(France) Bernard Hinault	(France) Jacques Bossis	(France) Régis Clère
1982	(France) Laurent Fignon	(France) André Chappuis	(France) Marcel Tinazzi
1983	(Republic of Ireland) Seán Kelly	(Switzerland) Jean-Marie Grezet	(Netherlands) Joop Zoetemelk
1984	(Republic of Ireland) Seán Kelly	(France) Pascal Simon	(Republic of Ireland) Stephen Roche
1985	(Republic of Ireland) Stephen Roche	(France) Charly Berard	(Republic of Ireland) Seán Kelly
1986	(Switzerland) Urs Zimmermann	(Republic of Ireland) Seán Kelly	(United States) Greg LeMond
1987	(Republic of Ireland) Seán Kelly	(Republic of Ireland) Stephen Roche	(France) Pascal Simon
1988	(Netherlands) Erik Breukink	(France) Laurent Fignon	(United Kingdom) Robert Millar
1989	(Spain) Miguel Induráin	(France) Charly Mottet	(Republic of Ireland) Stephen Roche
1990	(France) Laurent Fignon	(France) Gilles Delion	(France) Jean-Claude Leclercq
1991	(Republic of Ireland) Stephen Roche	(France) Gérard Rué	(France) Charly Mottet
1992	(France) Jean-François Bernard	(Netherlands) Gert-Jan Theunisse	(Italy) Giorgio Furlan
1993	(Netherlands) Erik Breukink	(Switzerland) Tony Rominger	(Switzerland) Alex Zülle
1994	(Italy) Giorgio Furlan	(Switzerland) Tony Rominger	(Russia) Evgueni Berzin
1995	(France) Laurent Jalabert	(Russia) Vladislav Bobrik	(Russia) Evgueni Berzin
1996	(United Kingdom) Chris Boardman	(Italy) Michele Coppolillo	(Switzerland) Mauro Gianetti
1997	(Spain) Marcelino García	(France) Laurent Jalabert	(France) Pascal Lino
1998	(United States) Bobby Julich	(Italy) Davide Rebellin	(Denmark) Bo Hamburger
1999	(Germany) Jens Voigt	(United Kingdom) David Millar	(Kazakhstan) Andrei Teteriouk
2000	(Spain) Abraham Olano	(Spain) Juan Carlos Domínguez	(Kazakhstan) Alexander Vinokourov
2001	(Belgium) Rik Verbrugghe	(Spain) José Alberto Martínez	(Germany) Jens Voigt
2002	(Spain) José Alberto Martínez	(United States) ~~Lance Armstrong~~*	(France) David Moncoutié
2003	(France) Laurent Brochard	(Germany) Jens Voigt	(France) David Moncoutié
2004	(Germany) Jens Voigt	(Spain) José Iván Gutiérrez	(United States) ~~Lance Armstrong~~*
2005	(United States) Bobby Julich	(Netherlands) Thomas Dekker	(Germany) Jörg Jaksche
2006	(Italy) Ivan Basso	(Netherlands) Erik Dekker	(Ukraine) Andriy Hrivko
2007	(Germany) Jens Voigt	(Sweden) Thomas Lövkvist	(Spain) Alejandro Valverde
2008	(Germany) Jens Voigt	(Sweden) Gustav Larsson	(Spain) Luis León Sánchez
2009	(Germany) Jens Voigt	(Czechoslovakia) František Raboň	(United States) Danny Pate
2010	(France) Pierrick Fédrigo	(Australia) Michael Rogers	(Portugal) Tiago Machado
2011	(Luxembourg) Fränk Schleck	(Belarus) Vasil Kiryienka	(Estonia) Rein Taaramäe
2012	(Australia) Cadel Evans	(France) Pierrick Fédrigo	(Australia) Michael Rogers
2013	(United Kingdom) Chris Froome	(Australia) Richie Porte	(United States) Tejay van Garderen
2014	(France) Jean-Christophe Péraud	(Switzerland) Mathias Frank	(Portugal) Tiago Machado
2015	(France) Jean-Christophe Péraud	(France) Thibaut Pinot	(Italy) Fabio Felline
2016	(France) Thibaut Pinot	(France) Pierre Latour	(Netherlands) Sam Oomen

*Results later voided for doping infringements

=== Multiple winners ===
Riders in italic are still active.

Wins	Rider	Editions
5	Émile Idée (FRA)	1940 + 1942 + 1943 + 1947 + 1949
5	Raymond Poulidor (FRA)	1964 + 1966 + 1968 + 1971 + 1972
5	Jens Voigt (GER)	1999 + 2004 + 2007 + 2008 + 2009
4	Jacques Anquetil (FRA)	1961 + 1963 + 1965 + 1967
3	Roger Hassenforder (FRA)	1954 + 1956 + 1958
3	Seán Kelly (IRL)	1983 + 1984 + 1987
2	Roger Lapébie (FRA)	1934 + 1937
2	Camille Danguillaume (FRA)	1946 + 1948
2	Louison Bobet (FRA)	1951 + 1952
2	Bernard Hinault (FRA)	1978 + 1981
2	Laurent Fignon (FRA)	1982 + 1990
2	Stephen Roche (IRL)	1985 + 1991
2	Erik Breukink (NED)	1988 + 1993
2	Bobby Julich (USA)	1998 + 2005
2	Jean-Christophe Péraud (FRA)	2014 + 2015

=== Wins per country ===
Wins	Country
58	France
5	Ireland, Germany
4	Spain
3	Netherlands
2	Italy, United States, United Kingdom
1	Australia, Belgium, Luxembourg, Switzerland
