= 1936 Tour de France =

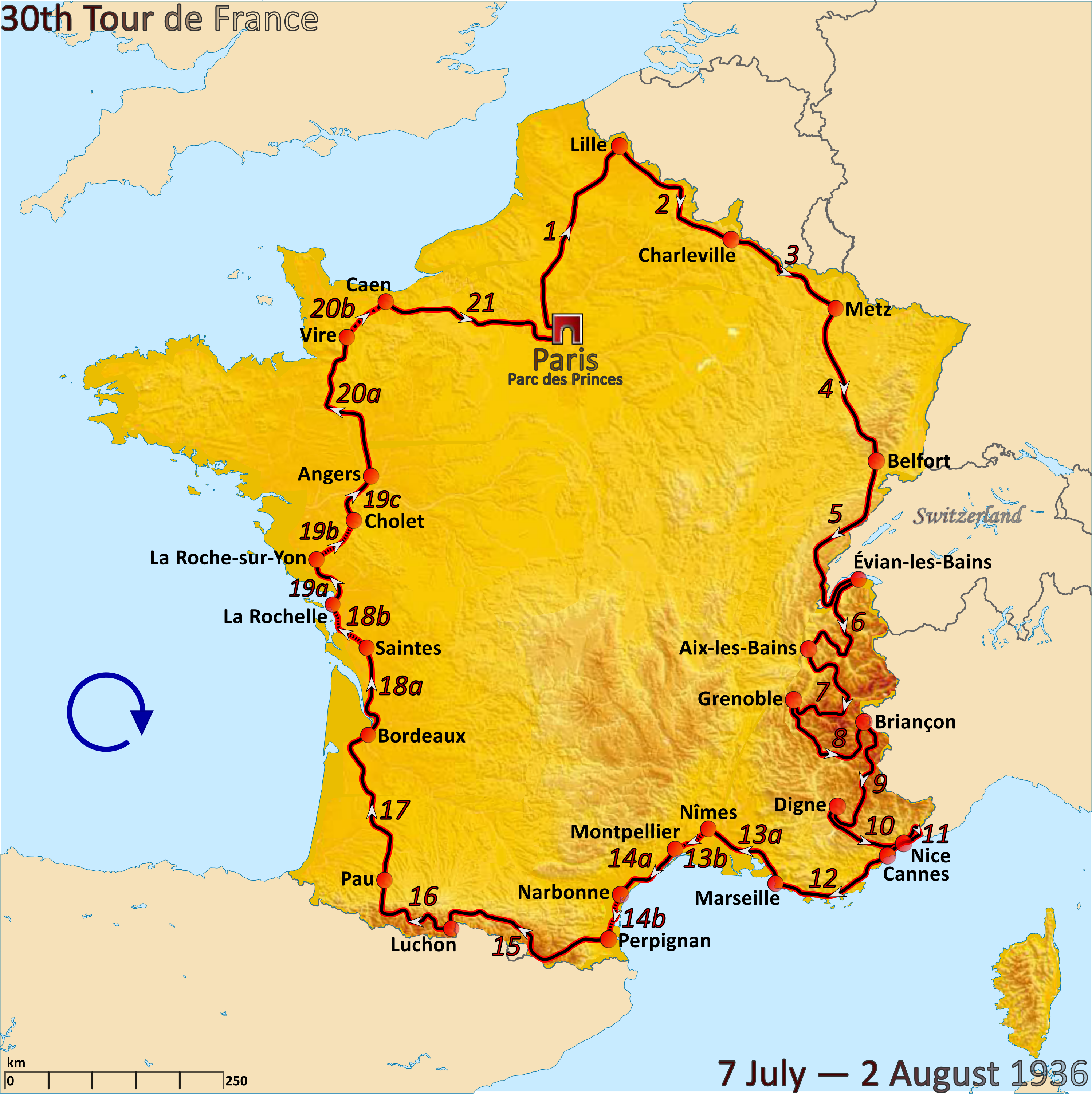
- Route of the 1936 Tour de France followed clockwise, starting in Paris

Race details
- Dates: 7 July – 2 August 1936
- Stages: 21, including five split stages
- Distance: 4,442 km (2,760 mi)
- Winning time: 142h 47' 32"

Results
Jersey awarded to the overall winner	Winner	Sylvère Maes (BEL)	(Belgium)
	Second	Antonin Magne (FRA)	(France)
	Third	Félicien Vervaecke (BEL)	(Belgium)
	Mountains	Julián Berrendero (ESP)	(Spain/Luxembourg)
	Team	Belgium	

The 1936 Tour de France was the 30th edition of the Tour de France, taking place from 7 July to 2 August. It was composed of 21 stages with a total length of 4,442 km (2,760 mi). Because of health problems, Henri Desgrange stopped as Tour director, and was succeeded by Jacques Goddet.

The race was won by Belgian cyclist Sylvère Maes. In the early stages, he battled with French Maurice Archambaud, until Archambaud lost many minutes on the eighth stage. Maes was then able to create a large margin with his new closest competitor Magne and teammate Vervaecke.

The team classification was won by the Belgian team, and Spanish cyclist Julián Berrendero won the mountains classification. There was also a one-time classification, based on points, that was won by Sylvère Maes.

== Innovations and changes ==
For the first time, a stage was divided into three parts. The race director at the start of the race was still Henri Desgrange, who had been race director since the first Tour de France in 1903. Desgrange, who was already 71 years old, had had kidney surgery weeks before the start of the Tour, but was determined to follow the Tour, and rode in a car full of cushions. After the second stage, he stopped, and made Jacques Goddet director. The individuals category which had been used in 1935 was not used in 1936.

The introduction of the summer holiday in France in 1936 meant that the number of spectators on the roadside increased.

The bonification system was the same as in 1935. This meant that the winner of a stage received 90 seconds, and the second cyclist 45 seconds. In addition, the winner received a bonification equal to the margin between him and the second cyclist, with a maximum of 2 minutes. The last bonification system was also used for the first cyclist to reach a mountain top that counted for the mountains classification.

== Teams ==
The riders were divided into two categories: the national teams and the touriste-routiers. There were four big national teams with 10 cyclists each: the Belgian team, the German team, the Spanish/Luxembourgian team and the French team. There were also five small teams of 4 cyclists each: the Swiss team, the Dutch team, the Yugoslavian team, the Romanian team and the Austrian team. For the Dutch, Yugoslavian and Romanian teams, it was the first participation ever. The Italian team was absent for political reasons (the Second Italo-Abyssinian War). An Italian team consisting of Italians living in France had been allowed to the race and even had jersey numbers designated, but finally the Tour organisers changed their minds.

The teams entering the race were:

- Belgium
- Germany
- Spain/Luxembourg
- France
- Switzerland
- Netherlands
- Yugoslavia
- Romania
- Austria

== Route and stages ==
Stages 13b, 14b, 18b, 19b and 20b were all run in the team-time-trial format. The highest point of elevation in the race was 2,556 m (8,386 ft) at the summit tunnel of the Col du Galibier mountain pass on stage 7.

Stage characteristics and winners
Stage	Date	Course	Distance	Type (Note: The icons shown here indicate whether the stage was run as a team time trial, the stage was flat or the stage included mountains that counted for the mountains classifications.)		Winner
1	7 July	Paris to Lille	258 km (160 mi)		Plain stage	Paul Egli (SUI)
2	8 July	Lille to Charleville	192 km (119 mi)		Plain stage	Robert Wierinckx (BEL)
3	9 July	Charleville to Metz	161 km (100 mi)		Plain stage	Mathias Clemens (LUX)
4	10 July	Metz to Belfort	220 km (140 mi)		Stage with mountain(s)	Maurice Archambaud (FRA)
5	11 July	Belfort to Évian-les-Bains	298 km (185 mi)		Plain stage	René Le Grevès (FRA)
	12 July	Évian-les-Bains			Rest day	
6	13 July	Évian-les-Bains to Aix-les-Bains	212 km (132 mi)		Stage with mountain(s)	Éloi Meulenberg (BEL)
7	14 July	Aix-les-Bains to Grenoble	230 km (140 mi)		Stage with mountain(s)	Theo Middelkamp (NED)
8	15 July	Grenoble to Briançon	194 km (121 mi)		Stage with mountain(s)	Jean-Marie Goasmat (FRA)
9	16 July	Briançon to Digne	220 km (140 mi)		Stage with mountain(s)	Léon Level (FRA)
	17 July	Digne			Rest day	
10	18 July	Digne to Nice	156 km (97 mi)		Plain stage	Paul Maye (FRA)
11	19 July	Nice to Cannes	126 km (78 mi)		Stage with mountain(s)	Fédérico Ezquerra (ESP)
	20 July	Cannes			Rest day	
12	21 July	Cannes to Marseille	195 km (121 mi)		Plain stage	René Le Grevès (FRA)
13a	22 July	Marseille to Nîmes	112 km (70 mi)		Plain stage	René Le Grevès (FRA)
13b	22 July	Nîmes to Montpellier	52 km (32 mi)	Team	Team time trial	Sylvère Maes (BEL)
14a	23 July	Montpellier to Narbonne	103 km (64 mi)		Plain stage	René Le Grevès (FRA)
14b	23 July	Narbonne to Perpignan	63 km (39 mi)	Team	Team time trial	Sylvère Maes (BEL)
	24 July	Perpignan			Rest day	
15	25 July	Perpignan to Luchon	325 km (202 mi)		Stage with mountain(s)	Sauveur Ducazeaux (FRA)
	14 July	Luchon			Rest day	
16	27 July	Luchon to Pau	194 km (121 mi)		Stage with mountain(s)	Sylvère Maes (BEL)
	28 July	Pau			Rest day	
17	29 July	Pau to Bordeaux	229 km (142 mi)		Plain stage	René Le Grevès (FRA)
18a	30 July	Bordeaux to Saintes	117 km (73 mi)		Plain stage	Éloi Meulenberg (BEL)
18b	30 July	Saintes to La Rochelle	75 km (47 mi)	Team	Team time trial	Sylvère Maes (BEL)
19a	31 July	La Rochelle to La Roche-sur-Yon	81 km (50 mi)		Plain stage	Marcel Kint (BEL)
19b	31 July	La Roche-sur-Yon to Cholet	65 km (40 mi)	Team	Team time trial	Félicien Vervaecke (BEL)
19c	31 July	Cholet to Angers	67 km (42 mi)		Plain stage	Paul Maye (FRA)
20a	1 August	Angers to Vire	204 km (127 mi)		Plain stage	René Le Grevès (FRA)
20b	1 August	Vire to Caen	55 km (34 mi)	Team	Team time trial	Antonin Magne (FRA)
21	2 August	Caen to Paris	234 km (145 mi)		Plain stage	Arsène Mersch (LUX)
	Total		4,442 km (2,760 mi)			

== Race overview ==
Swiss Paul Egli won the first stage, and thereby became the first Swiss cyclist to lead the general classification in the Tour de France. That first stage was run in terrible rain. In the second stage, the cyclists were split in two parts, and Egli was in the second part. Archambaud then took over the lead. Archambaud lost it to Luxembourgian Mersch in the next stage, but recaptured the lead when he won the fourth stage.

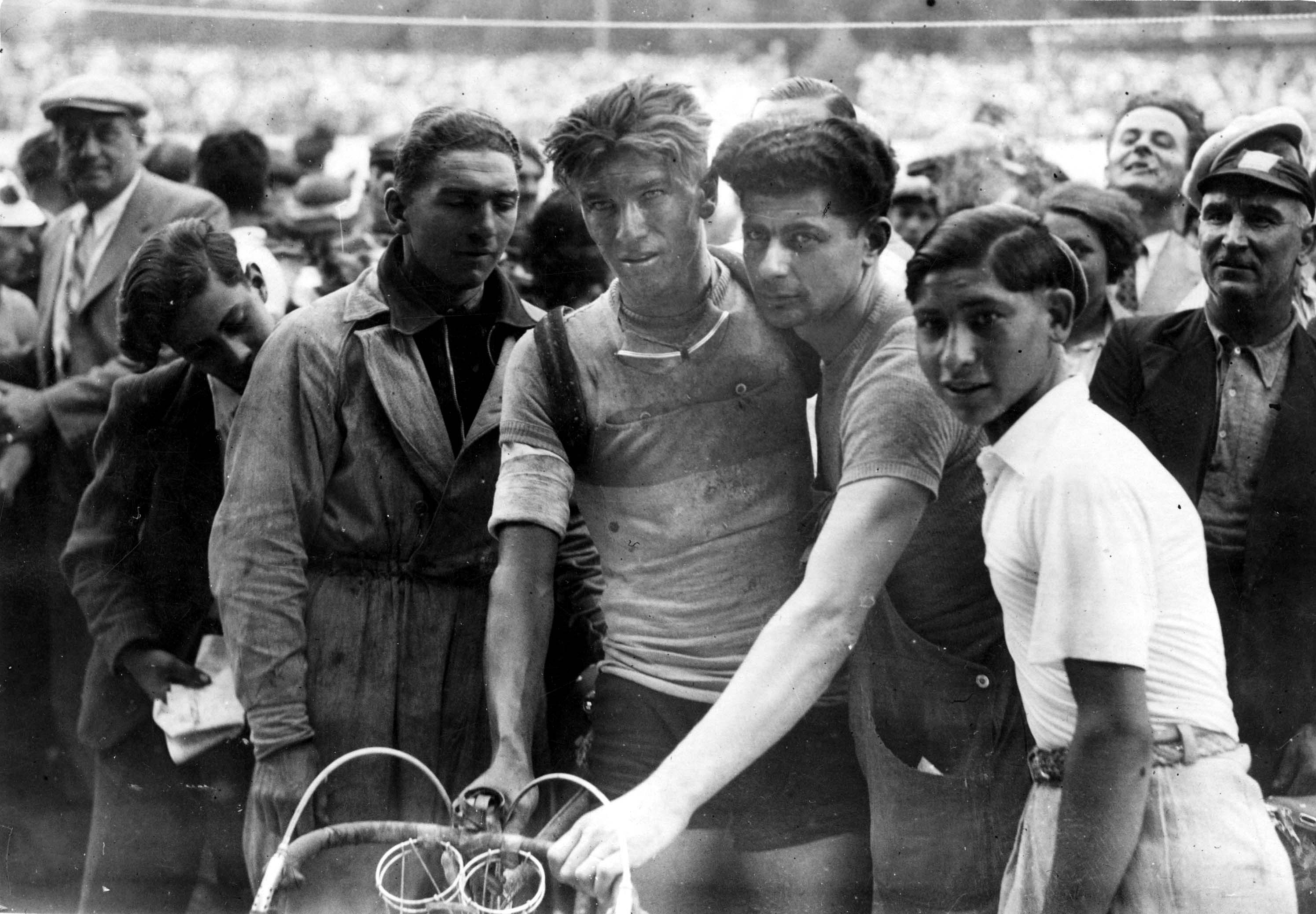
On stage seven, Theo Middelkamp became the first Dutch cyclist to win a Tour de France stage

The competition really started in the mountains of the seventh stage. Belgian Romain Maes, the winner of the 1935 Tour, was first over the first mountain, but then gave up, a victim of chronic bronchitis. On the next climb, Georges Speicher, winner of the 1930 Tour, gave up. Archambaud was still in the lead after that stage. The stage was won by Theo Middelkamp, who became the first Dutch cyclist to win a Tour stage. Before the 1936 Tour, Middelkamp had never seen a mountain in his life.

In the eighth stage, Archambaud could not follow anymore, and Sylvère Maes took over the lead. In third place was Antonin Magne, who had a good chance to win the race. Magne attacked on the next stage, but could not drop Maes. Later, Magne had to let the leading group get away, and lost a minute to Maes.

The stages between the Alps and the Pyrenees were partly run as team time trials. The Belgian team was superior here, and Magne lost more time. When it was time for the Pyrenees, he was eight minutes behind Maes.

In stage 15, the podium did not change, so it had to happen in stage 16, the last mountain stage. Magne attacked, but was unable to win back time. Maes was better, and including time bonuses Maes won eighteen minutes on Magne in that stage.

In that stage, Belgian Félicien Vervaecke had borrowed a bicycle with derailleur. It was allowed for touriste-routiers, but not for national team members, and he was fined with ten minutes penalty time in the general classification. Magne also got 10 minutes penalty time, for having received food when it was not allowed. Due to this penalty, Vervaecke lost his second place in the general classification, which Magne took over.

In the last part of the race, Maes extended his lead thanks to the team time trials, although the French team was finally also able to win one.

== Classification leadership and minor prizes ==
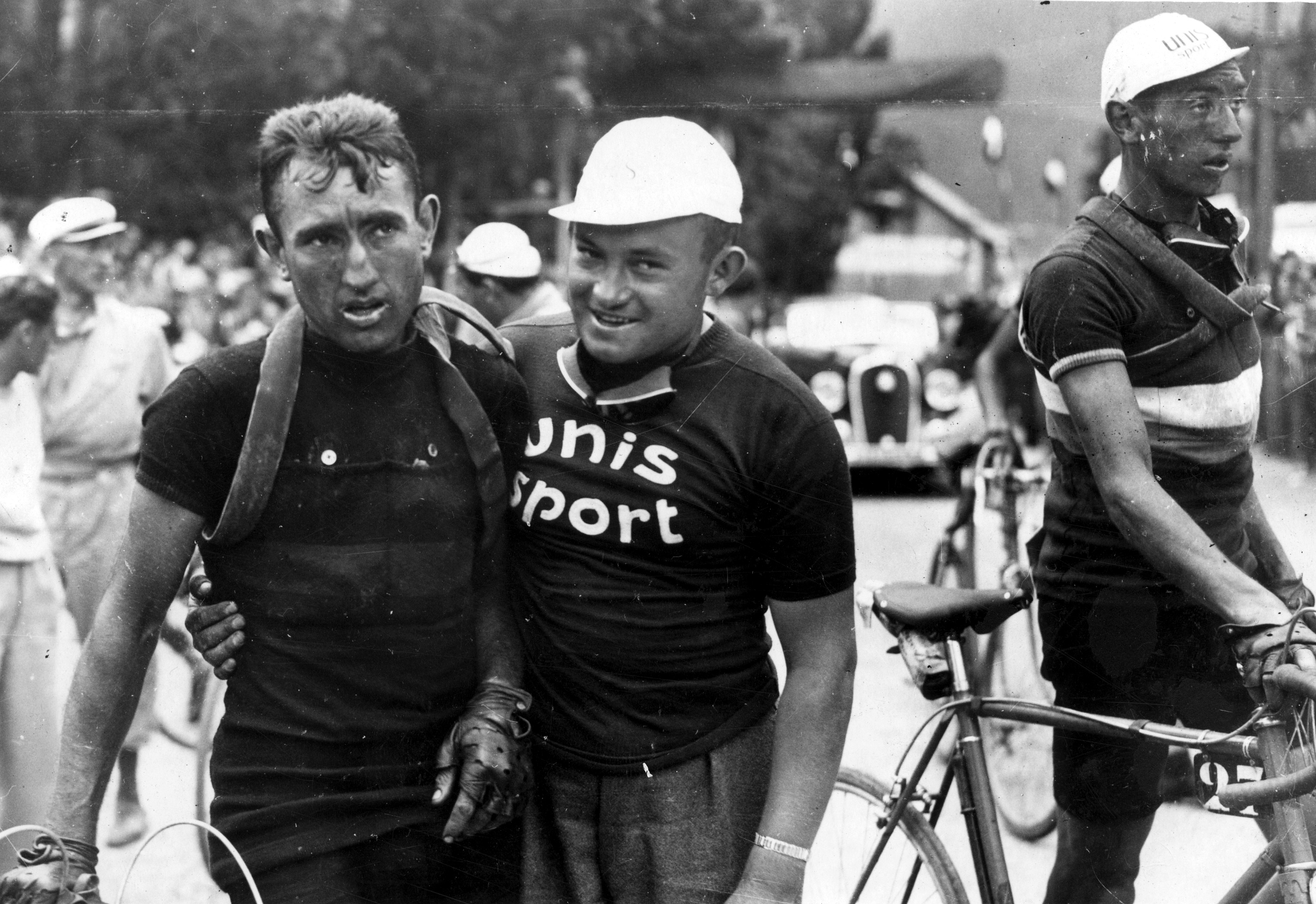
Sylvère Maes (pictured on stage eight) won the general classification

The time that each cyclist required to finish each stage was recorded, and these times were added together for the general classification. If a cyclist had received a time bonus, it was subtracted from this total; all time penalties were added to this total. The cyclist with the least accumulated time was the race leader, identified by the yellow jersey.

For the mountain classification, 16 mountains were selected by the Tour organisation. On the top of these mountains, ten points were given for the first cyclist to pass, nine points to the second cyclist, and so on, until the tenth cyclist who got one point.

There was also a points classification, for which the winner received 100.000 French Francs.

The team classification was calculated in 1936 by adding up the times of the best three cyclists of a team; the team with the least time was the winner. The other teams that started the race, the German, Swiss, Yugoslavian, Romanian and Austrian teams, did not finish with the minimum three cyclists to be eligible for the team classification.

Classification leadership by stage
Stage	Winner	General classification	Mountains classification (Note: No jersey was awarded to the leader of the mountains classification until a white jersey with red polka dots was introduced in 1975.)	Classification for touriste-routiers	Team classification
1	Paul Egli	Paul Egli	no award	Décimo Bettini	France
2	Robert Wierinckx	Maurice Archambaud	no award	Décimo Bettini	Belgium
3	Mathias Clemens	Arsène Mersch	no award	Yvan Marie	Belgium
4	Maurice Archambaud	Maurice Archambaud	Fédérico Ezquerra	Yvan Marie	Belgium
5	René Le Grevès	Maurice Archambaud	Fédérico Ezquerra	Sylvain Marcaillou	Belgium
6	Éloi Meulenberg	Maurice Archambaud	Fédérico Ezquerra	Yvan Marie	Belgium
7	Theo Middelkamp	Maurice Archambaud	Fédérico Ezquerra	Yvan Marie	Belgium
8	Jean-Marie Goasmat	Sylvère Maes	Fédérico Ezquerra	Jean-Marie Goasmat	Belgium
9	Léon Level	Sylvère Maes	Julián Berrendero	Léon Level	Luxembourg/Spain
10	Paul Maye	Sylvère Maes	Julián Berrendero	Léon Level	Luxembourg/Spain
11	Fédérico Ezquerra	Sylvère Maes	Fédérico Ezquerra	Léon Level	Luxembourg/Spain
12	René Le Grevès	Sylvère Maes	Fédérico Ezquerra	Léon Level	Belgium
13a	René Le Grevès	Sylvère Maes	Fédérico Ezquerra	Léon Level	Belgium
13b	Sylvère Maes	Sylvère Maes	Fédérico Ezquerra	Léon Level	Belgium
14a	René Le Grevès	Sylvère Maes	Fédérico Ezquerra	Léon Level	Belgium
14b	Sylvère Maes	Sylvère Maes	Fédérico Ezquerra	Léon Level	Belgium
15	Sauveur Ducazeaux	Sylvère Maes	Julián Berrendero	Léon Level	Belgium
16	Sylvère Maes	Sylvère Maes	Julián Berrendero	Léon Level	Belgium
17	René Le Grevès	Sylvère Maes	Julián Berrendero	Léon Level	Belgium
18a	Éloi Meulenberg	Sylvère Maes	Julián Berrendero	Léon Level	Belgium
18b	Sylvère Maes	Sylvère Maes	Julián Berrendero	Léon Level	Belgium
19a	Marcel Kint	Sylvère Maes	Julián Berrendero	Léon Level	Belgium
19b	Félicien Vervaecke	Sylvère Maes	Julián Berrendero	Léon Level	Belgium
19c	Paul Maye	Sylvère Maes	Julián Berrendero	Léon Level	Belgium
20a	René Le Grevès	Sylvère Maes	Julián Berrendero	Léon Level	Belgium
20b	Antonin Magne	Sylvère Maes	Julián Berrendero	Léon Level	Belgium
21	Arsène Mersch	Sylvère Maes	Julián Berrendero	Léon Level	Belgium
Final		Sylvère Maes	Julián Berrendero	Léon Level	Belgium

== Final standings ==
=== General classification ===
Final general classification (1–10)
Rank	Rider	Team	Time
1	Sylvère Maes (BEL)	Belgium	142h 47' 32"
2	Antonin Magne (FRA)	France	+ 26' 55"
3	Félicien Vervaecke (BEL)	Belgium	+ 27' 53"
4	Pierre Clemens (LUX)	Spain/Luxembourg	+ 42' 42"
5	Arsène Mersch (LUX)	Spain/Luxembourg	+ 52' 52"
6	Mariano Cañardo (ESP)	Spain/Luxembourg	+ 1h 03' 04"
7	Mathias Clemens (LUX)	Spain/Luxembourg	+ 1h 10' 44"
8	Leo Amberg (SUI)	Switzerland	+ 1h 19' 13"
9	Marcel Kint (BEL)	Belgium	+ 1h 22' 25"
10	Léon Level (FRA)	Touriste-routier	+ 1h 27' 57"

Final general classification (11–43)
Rank	Rider	Team	Time
11	Julián Berrendero (ESP)	Spain/Luxembourg	+ 1h 34' 37"
12	Sylvain Marcaillou (FRA)	Touriste-routier	+ 1h 38' 06"
13	Louis Thiétard (FRA)	Touriste-routier	+ 1h 47' 47"
14	Raoul Lesueur (FRA)	France	+ 1h 50' 15"
15	Albert van Schendel (NED)	Netherlands	+ 1h 52' 23"
16	Pierre Cogan (FRA)	France	+ 1h 52' 48"
17	Fédérico Ezquerra (ESP)	Touriste-routier	+ 1h 54' 39"
18	Robert Tanneveau (FRA)	France	+ 1h 57' 09"
19	François Neuville (BEL)	Belgium	+ 2h 01' 16"
20	René Le Grevès (FRA)	France	+ 2h 07' 45"
21	Yvan Marie (FRA)	Touriste-routier	+ 2h 08' 46"
22	Pierre Cloarec (FRA)	Touriste-routier	+ 2h 13' 53"
23	Theo Middelkamp (NED)	Netherlands	+ 2h 16' 33"
24	Emiliano Álvarez (ESP)	Spain/Luxembourg	+ 2h 26' 00"
25	Charles Berty (FRA)	Touriste-routier	+ 2h 28' 48"
26	Cyriel Van Overberghe (BEL)	Belgium	+ 2h 30' 14"
27	Alphonse Antoine (FRA)	Touriste-routier	+ 2h 31' 27"
28	Jean-Marie Goasmat (FRA)	Touriste-routier	+ 2h 34' 22"
29	Arthur Debruyckere (FRA)	France	+ 2h 34' 38"
30	Fernand Lemay (FRA)	Touriste-routier	+ 2h 51' 49"
31	Albert Hendrickx (BEL)	Belgium	+ 2h 57' 26"
32	Antoon van Schendel (NED)	Netherlands	+ 3h 14' 57"
33	Paul Maye (FRA)	France	+ 3h 15' 58"
34	Éloi Meulenberg (BEL)	Belgium	+ 3h 27' 32"
35	Marcel Walle (FRA)	Touriste-routier	+ 3h 29' 14"
36	Raymond Passat (FRA)	Touriste-routier	+ 3h 33' 58"
37	Sauveur Ducazeaux (FRA)	Touriste-routier	+ 3h 38' 18"
38	Edmond Pagès (FRA)	Touriste-routier	+ 3h 48' 26"
39	Gabriel Dubois (FRA)	Touriste-routier	+ 4h 09' 18"
40	Fabien Galateau (FRA)	Touriste-routier	+ 4h 21' 35"
41	Antoine Latorre (FRA)	Touriste-routier	+ 4h 23' 16"
42	Abd-el-Kader Abbes (ALG)	Touriste-routier	+ 4h 43' 33"
43	Aldo Bertocco (FRA)	Touriste-routier	+ 4h 49' 07"

=== Mountains classification ===
Mountains in the mountains classification
Stage	Rider	Height	Mountain range	Winner
4	Ballon d'Alsace	1,178 metres (3,865 ft)	Vosges	Fédérico Ezquerra
6	Aravis	1,498 metres (4,915 ft)	Alps	Fédérico Ezquerra
7	Galibier	2,556 metres (8,386 ft)	Alps	Fédérico Ezquerra
8	Côte de Laffrey	900 metres (3,000 ft)	Alps	Julián Berrendero
9	Izoard	2,361 metres (7,746 ft)	Alps	Sylvère Maes
9	Vars	2,110 metres (6,920 ft)	Alps	Julián Berrendero
9	Allos	2,250 metres (7,380 ft)	Alps	Julián Berrendero
11	Braus	1,002 metres (3,287 ft)	Alps-Maritimes	Félicien Vervaecke
11	La Turbie	555 metres (1,821 ft)	Alps-Maritimes	Fédérico Ezquerra
15	Puymorens	1,920 metres (6,300 ft)	Pyrenees	Fédérico Ezquerra
15	Port	1,249 metres (4,098 ft)	Pyrenees	Félicien Vervaecke
15	Portet d'Aspet	1,069 metres (3,507 ft)	Pyrenees	Sauveur Ducazeaux
16	Peyresourde	1,569 metres (5,148 ft)	Pyrenees	Julián Berrendero
16	Aspin	1,489 metres (4,885 ft)	Pyrenees	Yvan Marie
16	Tourmalet	2,115 metres (6,939 ft)	Pyrenees	Sylvère Maes
16	Aubisque	1,709 metres (5,607 ft)	Pyrenees	Sylvère Maes

Final mountains classification (1–10)
Rank	Rider	Team	Points
1	Julián Berrendero (ESP)	Spain/Luxembourg	132
2	Sylvère Maes (BEL)	Belgium	112
3	Fédérico Ezquerra (ESP)	Spain/Luxembourg	99
4	Félicien Vervaecke (BEL)	Belgium	95
5	Antonin Magne (FRA)	France	63
6	Leo Amberg (SUI)	Switzerland	48
7	Louis Thiétard (FRA)	Touriste-routier	45
8	Pierre Clemens (LUX)	Spain/Luxembourg	38
9	Yvan Marie (FRA)	Touriste-routier	28
10	Jean-Marie Goasmat (FRA)	Touriste-routier	27

=== Classification for 100.000 francs ===
Final standings (1–3)
Rank	Rider	Team	Points
1	Sylvère Maes (BEL)	Belgium	11
2	Fédérico Ezquerra (ESP)	Spain/Luxembourg	8
2	Jean-Marie Goasmat (FRA)	Touriste-routier	8

=== Team classification ===
Final team classification (1–5)
Rank	Team	Time
1	Belgium	430h 12' 54"
2	Spain/Luxembourg	+ 48' 20"
3	France	+ 2h 19' 40"
4	Netherlands	+ 5h 23' 28"
5	Switzerland	+ 9h 54' 01"

== Aftermath ==
The stage victory of the Dutch team convinced the Tour organisation to invite them in 1937 again.

== Bibliography ==
- Augendre, Jacques (2016). Guide historique [Historical guide] (PDF) (in French). Paris: Amaury Sport Organisation. Archived (PDF) from the original on 17 August 2016.
- Dauncey, Hugh; Hare, Geoff (2003). The Tour de France, 1903–2003: A Century of Sporting Structures, Meanings and Values. London: Frank Cass & Co. ISBN 978-0-203-50241-9.
- McGann, Bill; McGann, Carol (2006). The Story of the Tour de France: 1903–1964. Vol. 1. Indianapolis: Dog Ear Publishing. ISBN 978-1-59858-180-5.
- Nauright, John; Parrish, Charles (2012). Sports Around the World: History, Culture, and Practice. Vol. 2. Santa Barbara, California: ABC-CLIO. ISBN 978-1-59884-300-2.
