= 1938 La Flèche Wallonne =

Race details
- Dates: 1 May 1938
- Stages: 1
- Distance: 280 km (174.0 mi)
- Winning time: 8h 23' 00"

Results
	Winner	Émile Masson (BEL)
	Second	Sylvère Maes (BEL)
	Third	Cyrille Dubois (BEL)

The 1938 La Flèche Wallonne was the third edition of La Flèche Wallonne cycle race and was held on 1 May 1938. The race started in Tournai and finished in Rocourt. The race was won by Émile Masson.

== General classification ==
Final general classification

Rank	Rider	Time
1	Émile Masson (BEL)	8h 23' 00"
2	Sylvère Maes (BEL)	+ 43"
3	Cyrille Dubois (BEL)	+ 9' 17"
4	François Neuville (BEL)	+ 10' 46"
5	François de Donder (BEL)	+ 14' 35"
6	Albert Beirnaert (BEL)	+ 15' 50"
7	André Defoort (BEL)	+ 16' 07"
8	Remy Capoen (BEL)	+ 16' 44"
9	Remy Raeyen (BEL)	+ 21' 25"
10	François Coppens (BEL)	+ 35' 00"
