= Deforge =

Deforge or DeForge or Deforges is a surname. Notable people with the surname include:

- André Deforge (1914–1996), French racing cyclist
- Anna DeForge (born 1976), American basketball player
- Michael DeForge (born 1987), Canadian comics artist and illustrator
- Régine Deforges (1935–2014), French author, editor, director, and playwright
