= Marcel Walle =

French cyclist

Personal information
- Full name: Marcel Fernand Léon Walle
- Born: 7 June 1913 Sains-Richaumont, France
- Died: 1 May 1943 (aged 29) Nazi Germany

Cycling career
- Sport: Cycling
- Discipline: Road
- Role: Rider

Marcel Fernand Léon Walle (7 June 1913 – 1 May 1943) was a French racing cyclist. He rode in the 1936 Tour de France.

== Personal life ==
Walle served in the 2nd Machine Gun Battalion of the French Army during the Second World War and died from illness contracted while a prisoner of war in Germany on 1 May 1943.
