= Mountains classification in the Tour de France =

Secondary competition in the Tour de France

Polka dot jersey
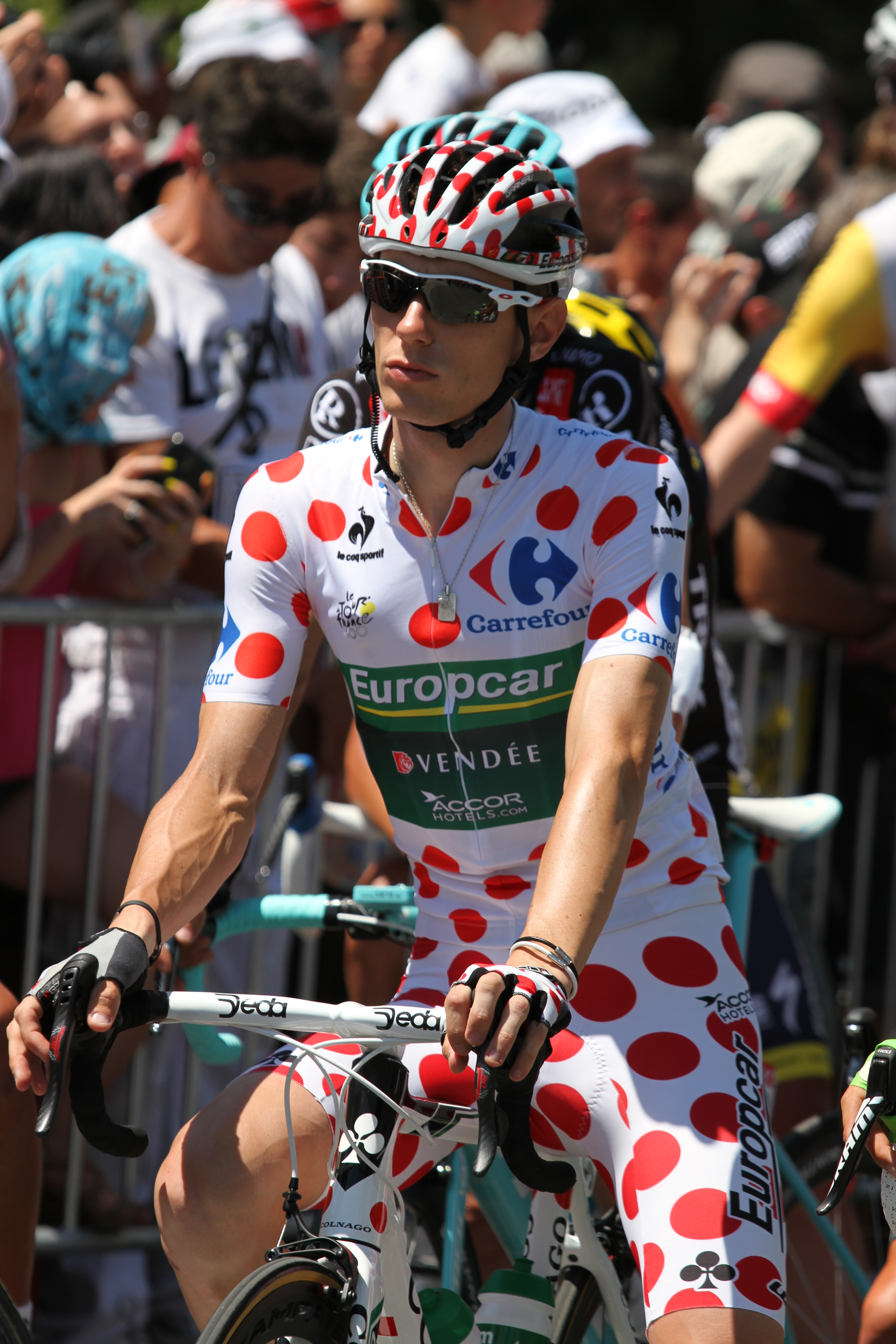
- The 2013 polka dot jersey, worn by Pierre Rolland
- Sport: Road bicycle racing
- Competition: Tour de France
- Awarded for: Best climber
- Local name: Maillot à pois rouges (French)

History
- First award: 1933 (jersey since 1975)
- Editions: 87 (as of 2026)
- First winner: Vicente Trueba (ESP)
- Most wins: Richard Virenque (FRA) 7 wins
- Most recent: Richard Carapaz (ECU)

The mountains classification is a secondary competition in the Tour de France, that started in 1933. It is given to the rider that gains the most points for reaching mountain summits first. The leader of the classification is named the King of the Mountains, and since 1975 wears the polka dot jersey (French: maillot à pois rouges), a white jersey with red polka dots.

== History ==
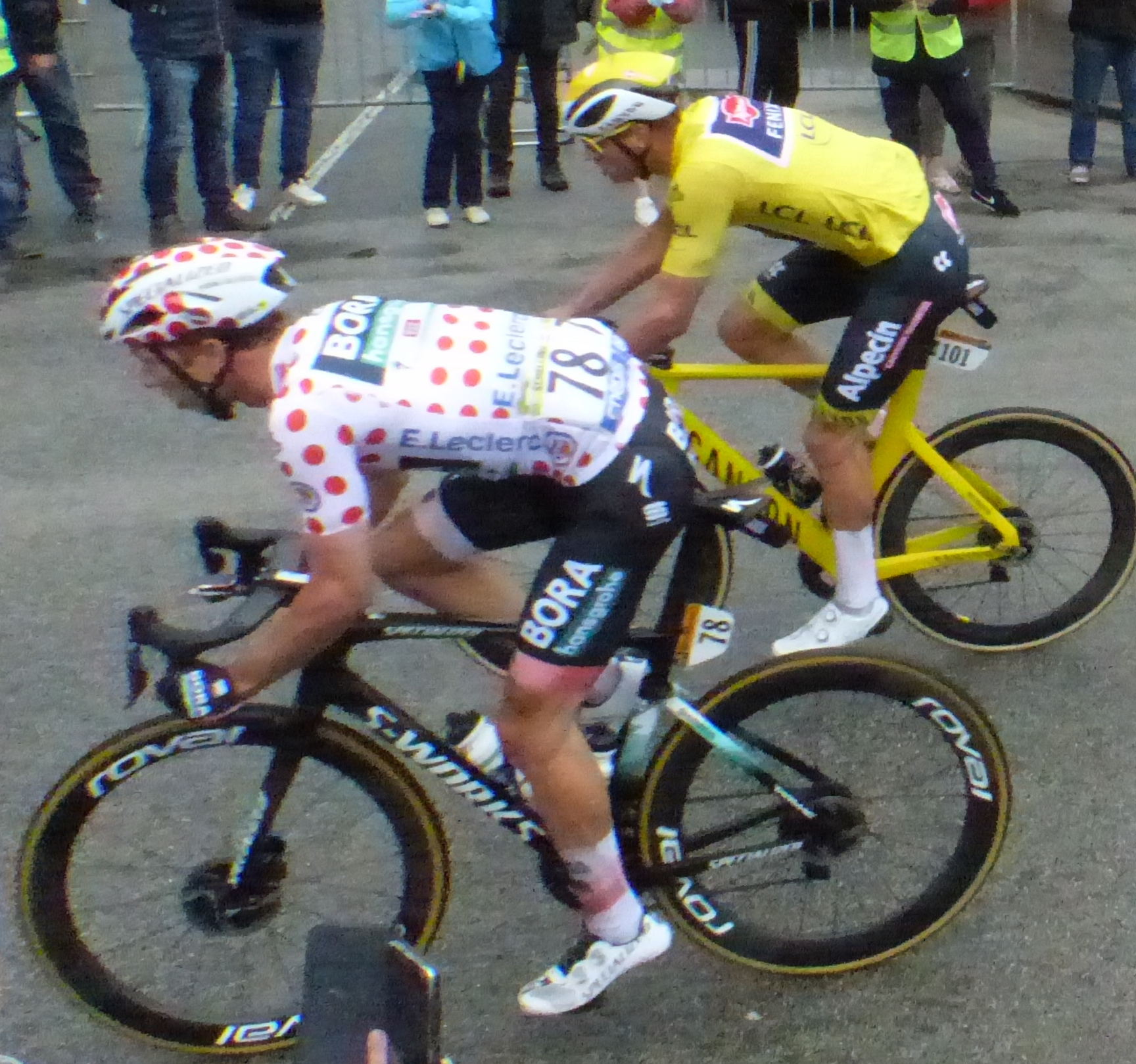
Ide Schelling in the 2021 polka dot jersey

The first Tour de France crossed no mountain passes, but several lesser cols. The first was the col des Echarmeaux (712 m (2,336 ft)), on the opening stage from Paris to Lyon, on what is now the old road from Autun to Lyon. The stage from Lyon to Marseille included the col de la République (1,161 m (3,809 ft)), also known as the col du Grand Bois, at the edge of St-Etienne. The first major climb—the Ballon d'Alsace (1,178 m (3,865 ft)) in the Vosges — was featured in the 1905 race.

True mountains were not included until the Pyrenees in 1910. In that year the race rode, or more walked, first the col d'Aubisque and then the nearby Tourmalet. Both climbs were mule tracks, a demanding challenge on heavy, ungeared bikes ridden by men with spare tires around their shoulders and their food, clothing and tools in bags hung from their handlebars. The assistant organiser, Victor Breyer, stood at the summit of the Aubisque with the colleague who had proposed including the Pyrenees, Alphonse Steinès. The tour organiser, Henri Desgrange was confident enough after the Pyrenees to include the Alps in 1911.

The highest climb in the race was the Cime de la Bonette-Restefond in the 1962 Tour de France, reaching 2802 m. The highest mountain finish in the Tour was at the Col du Galibier in the 2011 edition.

Since 1905, the organising newspaper l'Auto named one cyclist of the Tour de France the meilleur grimpeur (best climber). In 1933, Vicente Trueba was the winner of this classification. In order to recognize climbers, the Tour de France director, Henri Desgrange, decided that cyclists should receive a bonus for reaching the tops first. From 1934 on, the gap between the first and the second cyclist to reach the top was given as a time bonus to the one reaching the top first. These time bonuses were later removed, but the King of the Mountain recognition remained. Although the best climber was first recognised in 1933, the distinctive jersey was not introduced until 1975, as the sponsor, Chocolat Poulain, wanted to enhance the visibility of the jersey in the peloton. The Tour's organizer Félix Lévitan decided to use the jersey used by the cyclist Henri Lemoine as a tribute to him. As a consequence, the sponsor, Chocolat Poulain, decided to change its wrappings of chocolate bars and covered them in a polka dot wrapper.

The first rider to ever wear the Polka Dot Jersey, during the 1975 Tour de France, was Joop Zoetemelk, and while he never won the King of the Mountains competition in the Tour De France he is considered to be one of the greatest climbers in Tour de France history. Zoetemelk did win the mountains classification in the 1971 Vuelta a España, as well as the general classification in the 1979 Vuelta a España and the 1980 Tour de France.

=== Sponsorship ===
The polka dots originate from sponsor Chocolat Poulain. Between 1993 and 2018, the jersey was sponsored by Carrefour supermarkets, initially under the Champion brand, and later under the main Carrefour brand from the 2009 edition of the Tour. Since 2019, the jersey is sponsored by E.Leclerc supermarkets.

=== Jerseys ranking ===
The polka dot jersey is the third most important jersey in the Tour de France, third to yellow and green jerseys. If a rider is the leader in the general and/or points classifications and in the mountain classification he will wear the yellow or green jersey. The second rider (or the following eligible rider) in the mountain classification will wear polka dot jersey with some exceptions:

- If the second rider also leads the young rider classification, he will wear the white jersey (for example if rider A is first in both the general and mountain classification and rider B is second in the mountain classification but also the leader in young rider classification, then rider A will wear the yellow jersey and rider B will wear the white jersey);
- If the second rider is world champion he will wear the rainbow jersey. If the rider is a continental champion or national champion he will wear the corresponding jersey;

In both case the third rider (or the following eligible rider) will be in polka dot jersey.

== Current situation ==
At the top of many climbs in the Tour, there are points for the riders who are first over the top. The climbs are divided into categories from 1 (very difficult mountains) to 4 (least difficult hills) based on their difficulty, measured as a function of their steepness, length, location within the stage (near the start or end), and location in the overall race (early in the race or toward the end). A few of the toughest mountain climbs were originally given different individual points scales, and were thus listed as "beyond categorisation" (Hors catégorie, a term that has since passed into the French language to refer to any exceptional phenomenon); however, since the 1980s, the hors catégorie climbs have been merged into the single scale and have effectively become, despite the name, just a top category above category 1. In 2004, the scoring system was changed such that the first rider over a fourth category climb would be awarded 3 points while the first to complete a hors catégorie climb would be awarded 20 points. Further points over a fourth category climb are only for the top three places while on a hors catégorie climb the top ten riders are rewarded. From 2004 to 2021, points scored on the final climb of the day were doubled where that climb was at least a second category climb. In 2022 and 2023, mountain-top finishes were worth the same number of points as any other climb.

=== Distribution of points ===
The points gained by consecutive riders reaching a mountain top are distributed according to the following classification:

Point distribution grid in use since 2017
Pos.	4C	3C	2C	1C	HC
1st	1	2	5	10	20
2nd		1	3	8	15
3rd			2	6	12
4th			1	4	10
5th				2	8
6th				1	6
7th					4
8th					2

If two riders have an equal number of points, the rider with the most first places on the hors catégorie cols, is declared winner. If the riders arrived first an equal number of times, the first places on the 1st category cols are compared. Should the two riders again have an equal number of first arrivals in this category, the organization looks at mutual results in the 2nd, 3rd and 4th category, until a winner is found. If the number of first arrivals in all categories is equal for both riders, the rider with the highest position in the overall list of rankings receives the mountain jersey.

==== Double points ====
During the 2000s, the Tour de France organization decided to double the points awarded at the top of certain ascents:

- between 2004 and 2010 editions, the last climb of the stage awarded double points if the climb is at least a 2nd category;
- between 2011 and 2016 editions happened the same but only if the last climb is also the finish line of the stage;
- between 2017 and 2021 and since 2023, points are doubled on some hors catégorie (also 1st category in 2018) chosen by the organizers:
  - in 2017, hors catégorie also stage finish (only one case);
  - in 2018, the last ascension, whether 1st category or hors catégorie, from which stage of the last massif traversed (3 stages in the Pyrenees);
  - hors catégorie climbs higher than 2000 meters (5 climbs in 2019, 1 in 2020);
  - the last climb of the stage if the climb is hors catégorie (3 climbs in 2021);
  - Highest point in the Tour de France (1 climb in 2023, 2024 and 2025).

For 2020, "Double points will be awarded at the top of passes or at the finish of stage 17 at Méribel Col de la Loze, the highest peak in the 2020 Tour (2,304 masl)". The organisation of the race determines which mountains are included for the mountains classification and in which category they are

=== Past point distribution ===
		1	2	3	4	5	6	7	8	9	10	11	12	13	14	15
2011–2016	HC (Note: between 2012 and 2016 editions)	25	20	16	14	12	10	8	6	4	2					
2011–2016	HC (Note: only 2011 edition)	20	16	12	8	4	2									
2011–2016	1C	10	8	6	4	2	1									
2011–2016	2C	5	3	2	1											
2011–2016	3C	2	1													
2011–2016	4C	1														
2004–2010	HC	20	18	16	14	12	10	8	7	6	5					
2004–2010	1C	15	13	11	9	8	7	6	5							
2004–2010	2C	10	9	8	7	6	5									
2004–2010	3C	4	3	2	1											
2004–2010	4C	3	2	1												
1984–2003	HC	40	35	30	26	22	18	16	14	12	10	8	6	4	2	1
1984–2003	1C	30	26	22	18	16	14	12	10	8	6	4	2	1		
1984–2003	2C	20	15	12	10	8	6	4	3	2	1					
1984–2003	3C (Note: between 1990 and 2003 editions)	10	7	5	3	1										
1984–2003	3C (Note: between 1987 and 1989 editions)	7	5	3	2	1										
1984–2003	3C (Note: between 1984 and 1986 editions)	7	5	4	3	2	1									
1984–2003	4C (Note: between 1990 and 2003 editions)	5	3	1												
1984–2003	4C (Note: between 1984 and 1989 editions)	4	2	1												
1979–1983	HC	25	20	18	16	14	12	10	8	7	6	5	4	3	2	1
1979–1983	1C	20	16	14	12	10	8	6	5	4	3	2	1			
1979–1983	2C	15	12	10	8	6	5	4	3	2	1					
1979–1983	3C (Note: only 1983 edition)	7	5	4	3	2	1									
1979–1983	3C (Note: between 1979 and 1982 editions)	8	6	4	3	2	1									
1979–1983	4C (Note: between 1980 and 1983 editions)	4	2	1												
1979–1983	4C (Note: only 1979 edition)	3	2	1												
1975–1978	1C	20	16	14	12	10	8	6	5	4	3	2	1			
1975–1978	2C	15	12	10	8	6	5	4	3	2	1					
1975–1978	3C	8	6	4	3	2	1									
1975–1978	4C	3	2	1												
1971–1974	1C	15	12	10	8	6	5	4	3	2	1					
1971–1974	2C	12	10	8	6	5	4	3	2							
1971–1974	3C	10	8	6	4	3	2									
1971–1974	4C	5	3	2	1											
1962–1970	1C	15	12	10	8	6	5	4	3	2	1					
1962–1970	2C	10	8	6	4	3	2	1								
1962–1970	3C	5	4	3	2	1										
1962–1970	4C (Note: no 4th category climbs in 1963)	3	2	1												
1949–1961	1C	10	9	8	7	6	5	4	3	2	1					
1949–1961	2C	6	5	4	3	2	1									
1949–1961	3C	3	2	1												
1947–1948	A	10	9	8	7	6	5	4	3	2	1					
1947–1948	B	5	4	3	2	1										
1933–1939	-	10	9	8	7	6	5	4	3	2	1					

== Criticism of the system ==
The system has faced criticism. Six-time winner Lucien Van Impe said in 2010 that the mountain jersey has been devalued, because it goes to cyclists who have no hope of winning the general classification and are therefore allowed to escape and gather points in breakaways by the general classification contenders. According to Van Impe, focusing on the mountain classification was started by cyclists such as Laurent Jalabert and Richard Virenque, but compared to modern mountain classification specialists, "they could really climb, and they could win sprints on hors category climbs or even win the stage". However, in 2015, 2020, 2021, 2022 and 2025, the mountain classification winner also won the general classification.

== Winners ==
=== Meilleurs grimpeurs (top climbers) ===
This list shows the cyclists who were chosen meilleur grimpeur by the newspaper L'Auto. Although L'Auto was organising the Tour de France, the meilleur grimpeur title was not given by the tour organisation, so it is unofficial. However, it is a direct predecessor of the later King of the Mountains title.

Year	Country	Rider	Team
1905	France	René Pottier	
1906	France	René Pottier	
1907	France	Emile Georget	
1908	France	Gustave Garrigou	
1909	Luxembourg	François Faber	
1910	France	Octave Lapize	
1911	France	Paul Duboc	
1912	Belgium	Odiel Defraeye	
1913	Belgium	Philippe Thys	
1914	Belgium	Firmin Lambot	
1919	France	Honoré Barthélemy	
1920	Belgium	Firmin Lambot	
1921	Belgium	Hector Heusghem	
1922	France	Jean Alavoine	
1923	France	Henri Pélissier	
1924	Italy	Ottavio Bottecchia	
1925	Italy	Ottavio Bottecchia	
1926	Belgium	Lucien Buysse	
1927	Italy	Giovanni-Michele Gordini	
1928	France	Victor Fontan	
1929	France	Victor Fontan	
1930	France	Benoît Fauré	
1931	Belgium	Joseph Demuysere	
1932	Spain	Vicente Trueba	

=== Mountains classification ===
Year	Country	Rider	Team
1933	Spain	Vicente Trueba	Touriste-routier
1934	France	René Vietto	France
1935	Belgium	Félicien Vervaecke	Belgium
1936	Spain	Julián Berrendero	Spain–Luxembourg
1937	Belgium	Félicien Vervaecke	Belgium
1938	Italy	Gino Bartali	Italy
1939	Belgium	Sylvère Maes	Belgium
1947	Italy	Pierre Brambilla	Italy
1948	Italy	Gino Bartali	Italy
1949	Italy	Fausto Coppi	Italy
1950	France	Louison Bobet	France
1951	France	Raphaël Géminiani	France
1952	Italy	Fausto Coppi	Italy
1953	Spain	Jesús Loroño	Spain
1954	Spain	Federico Bahamontes	Spain
1955	Luxembourg	Charly Gaul	Luxembourg–Mixed
1956	Luxembourg	Charly Gaul	Luxembourg–Mixed
1957	Italy	Gastone Nencini	Italy
1958	Spain	Federico Bahamontes	Spain
1959	Spain	Federico Bahamontes	Spain
1960	Italy	Imerio Massignan	Italy
1961	Italy	Imerio Massignan	Italy
1962	Spain	Federico Bahamontes	Margnat–Paloma–D'Alessandro
1963	Spain	Federico Bahamontes	Margnat–Paloma–Dunlop
1964	Spain	Federico Bahamontes	Margnat–Paloma–Dunlop
1965	Spain	Julio Jimenez	Kas–Kaskol
1966	Spain	Julio Jimenez	Ford France–Hutchinson
1967	Spain	Julio Jimenez	Spain
1968	Spain	Aurelio Gonzalez	Spain
1969	Belgium	Eddy Merckx	Faema
1970	Belgium	Eddy Merckx	Faemino–Faema
1971	Belgium	Lucien Van Impe	Sonolor–Lejeune
1972	Belgium	Lucien Van Impe	Sonolor–Lejeune
1973	Spain	Pedro Torres	La Casera–Peña Bahamontes
1974	Spain	Domingo Perurena	Kas–Kaskol
1975	Belgium	Lucien Van Impe	Gitane–Campagnolo
1976	Italy	Giancarlo Bellini	Brooklyn
1977	Belgium	Lucien Van Impe	Lejeune–BP
1978	France	Mariano Martínez	Jobo–Spidel–La Roue d'Or
1979	Italy	Giovanni Battaglin	Inoxpran
1980	France	Raymond Martin	Miko–Mercier–Vivagel
1981	Belgium	Lucien Van Impe	Boston–Mavic
1982	France	Bernard Vallet	La Redoute–Motobécane
1983	Belgium	Lucien Van Impe	Metauro Mobili–Pinarello
1984	Great Britain	Robert Millar	Peugeot–Shell–Michelin
1985	Colombia	Luis Herrera	Varta–Café de Colombia–Mavic
1986	France	Bernard Hinault	La Vie Claire
1987	Colombia	Luis Herrera	Café de Colombia–Varta
1988	Netherlands	Steven Rooks	PDM–Ultima–Concorde
1989	Netherlands	Gert-Jan Theunisse	PDM–Ultima–Concorde
1990	France	Thierry Claveyrolat	RMO
1991	Italy	Claudio Chiappucci	Carrera Jeans–Tassoni
1992	Italy	Claudio Chiappucci	Carrera Jeans–Vagabond
1993	Switzerland	Tony Rominger	CLAS–Cajastur
1994	France	Richard Virenque	Festina–Lotus
1995	France	Richard Virenque	Festina–Lotus
1996	France	Richard Virenque	Festina–Lotus
1997	France	Richard Virenque	Festina–Lotus
1998	France	Christophe Rinero	Cofidis
1999	France	Richard Virenque	Team Polti
2000	Colombia	Santiago Botero	Kelme–Costa Blanca
2001	France	Laurent Jalabert	CSC–Tiscali
2002	France	Laurent Jalabert	CSC–Tiscali
2003	France	Richard Virenque	Quick-Step–Davitamon
2004	France	Richard Virenque	Quick-Step–Davitamon
2005	Denmark	Michael Rasmussen	Rabobank
2006	Denmark	Michael Rasmussen	Rabobank
2007	Colombia	Mauricio Soler	Barloworld
2008	Spain	~~Bernhard Kohl~~ Carlos Sastre	CSC–Saxo Bank
2009	Spain	~~Franco Pellizotti~~ Egoi Martínez	Euskaltel–Euskadi
2010	France	Anthony Charteau	Bbox Bouygues Telecom
2011	Spain	Samuel Sánchez	Euskaltel–Euskadi
2012	France	Thomas Voeckler	Team Europcar
2013	Colombia	Nairo Quintana	Movistar Team
2014	Poland	Rafał Majka	Tinkoff–Saxo
2015	Great Britain	Chris Froome	Team Sky
2016	Poland	Rafał Majka	Tinkoff
2017	France	Warren Barguil	Team Sunweb
2018	France	Julian Alaphilippe	Quick-Step Floors
2019	France	Romain Bardet	AG2R La Mondiale
2020	Slovenia	Tadej Pogačar	UAE Team Emirates
2021	Slovenia	Tadej Pogačar	UAE Team Emirates
2022	Denmark	Jonas Vingegaard	Team Jumbo–Visma
2023	Italy	Giulio Ciccone	Lidl–Trek
2024	Ecuador	Richard Carapaz	EF Education–EasyPost
2025	Slovenia	Tadej Pogačar	UAE Team Emirates XRG
2026	Ecuador	Richard Carapaz	EF Education–EasyPost

=== Repeat winners ===
Rank	Name	Country	Wins	Years
1	Richard Virenque	France	7	1994, 1995, 1996, 1997, 1999, 2003, 2004
2	Federico Bahamontes	Spain	6	1954, 1958, 1959, 1962, 1963, 1964
2	Lucien Van Impe	Belgium	6	1971, 1972, 1975, 1977, 1981, 1983
4	Julio Jiménez	Spain	3	1965, 1966, 1967
4	Tadej Pogačar	Slovenia	3	2020, 2021, 2025
6	Felicien Vervaecke	Belgium	2	1935, 1937
6	Gino Bartali	Italy	2	1938, 1948
6	Fausto Coppi	Italy	2	1949, 1952
6	Charly Gaul	Luxembourg	2	1955, 1956
6	Imerio Massignan	Italy	2	1960, 1961
6	Eddy Merckx	Belgium	2	1969, 1970
6	Luis Herrera	Colombia	2	1985, 1987
6	Claudio Chiappucci	Italy	2	1991, 1992
6	Laurent Jalabert	France	2	2001, 2002
6	Michael Rasmussen	Denmark	2	2005, 2006
6	Rafał Majka	Poland	2	2014, 2016
6	Richard Carapaz	Ecuador	2	2024, 2026

=== By nationality ===
Rank	Country	Wins	Riders winning most	Most recent winner
1	France	23	Richard Virenque (7)	Romain Bardet (2019)
2	Spain	18	Federico Bahamontes (6)	Samuel Sánchez (2011)
3	Italy	13	Gino Bartali, Fausto Coppi, Imerio Massignan, Claudio Chiappucci (2 each)	Giulio Ciccone (2023)
4	Belgium	11	Lucien Van Impe (6)	Lucien Van Impe (1983)
5	Colombia	5	Luis Herrera (2)	Nairo Quintana (2013)
6	Denmark	3	Michael Rasmussen (2)	Jonas Vingegaard (2022)
6	Slovenia	3	Tadej Pogačar (3)	Tadej Pogačar (2025)
8	Luxembourg	2	Charly Gaul (2)	Charly Gaul (1956)
8	Netherlands	2	Steven Rooks, Gert-Jan Theunisse	Gert-Jan Theunisse (1989)
8	United Kingdom	2	Robert Millar, Chris Froome	Chris Froome (2015)
8	Poland	2	Rafał Majka (2)	Rafał Majka (2016)
8	Ecuador	2	Richard Carapaz (2)	Richard Carapaz (2026)
12	Switzerland	1	Tony Rominger	Tony Rominger (1993)

=== Winners of the general and mountain classification in the same year ===
Some cyclists have won both the general classification and the mountains classification in the same year. In the early years of the Tour, only the highest mountains gave points. Cyclists aiming for the Tour win generally did well on those mountains, so the riders high in the general classification were typically also high in the mountains classification, which made the double more likely. Later, the rules of the mountains classification changed, giving more points to mountains of lower category. The cyclists aiming to win the general classification did not spend energy on those lower category mountains, and thus other cyclists could aim for the mountains classification win. In 1969, Eddy Merckx won not only the general classification and the mountains classification, but also the points classification.

The general classification and the mountain classification were won by the same rider thirteen times, by eight different cyclists:

- 1938: Gino Bartali
- 1939: Sylvère Maes
- 1948: Gino Bartali
- 1949: Fausto Coppi
- 1952: Fausto Coppi
- 1959: Federico Bahamontes
- 1969: Eddy Merckx
- 1970: Eddy Merckx
- 2008: Carlos Sastre
- 2015: Chris Froome
- 2020: Tadej Pogačar
- 2021: Tadej Pogačar
- 2022: Jonas Vingegaard
- 2025: Tadej Pogačar

=== Days in polka dot jersey ===
after the end of 2026 Tour de France

The classification existed since 1933. The polka dot jersey was issued since the 1975.

Rider	Days	Stages
(France) Richard Virenque	96	96
(Belgium) Lucien Van Impe	81	94
(Spain) Federico Bahamontes	74	77
(Spain) Julio Jimenez	40	43
(Slovenia) Tadej Pogačar	40	40
(Belgium) Eddy Merckx	36	40
(Belgium) Félicien Vervaecke	33	48
(Denmark) Michael Rasmussen	27	27
(Spain) Domingo Perurena	26	30
(Italy) Claudio Chiappucci	26	27
(Italy) Gino Bartali	25	30
(Colombia) Luis Herrera	25	26
(Italy) Fausto Coppi	24	24
(France) Bernard Hinault	22	23
(France) Bernard Vallet	20	21
(Spain) Vicente Trueba	20	20
(Luxembourg) Charly Gaul	20	20
(Belgium) Tim Wellens	20	20

leading mountain classification before polka dot jersey was introduced.

==== Riders leading all stages of an edition ====
===== Before 1975 =====
In some editions the Mountain Classification, without a distinctive jersey, was not compiled in the first stages (no points awarded in the first stages). Some riders led all the stages after the first points were awarded:

- (Spain) Vicente Trueba 1933 (first stage awarding points: 4th stage)
- (Belgium) Félicien Vervaecke 1935 (first stage awarding points: 4th stage)
- (Italy) Gino Bartali 1938 (first stage awarding points: 8th stage)
- (Italy) Fausto Coppi 1949 (first stage awarding points: 11th stage)
- (Spain) Federico Bahamontes 1954 (first stage awarding points: 11th stage)
- (Spain) Federico Bahamontes 1958 (first stage awarding points: 13th stage)
- (Spain) Federico Bahamontes 1963 (first stage awarding points: 10th stage)

===== After 1975 =====
No riders wore the jersey in all stages of a single edition. Lucien Van Impe in 1977 wore it in most stages in a single edition: 25 of the 28 stages (but the jersey was not issued in the prologue). Bernard Vallet in 1982 lead the classification in all 21 numbered stages but not after the prologue.

== Bibliography ==
- Woodland, Les (2000). The Unknown Tour De France: The Many Faces of the World's Biggest Bicycle Race. U.S.: Cycling Resources. ISBN 978-1-892495-26-6.
- Woodland, Les (2007) [1st. pub. 2003]. The Yellow Jersey Companion to the Tour de France. London: Random House. ISBN 978-0-224-08016-3.
- McGann, Bill; McGann, Carol (2006). The Story of the Tour de France, Volume 1. Indianapolis, U.S.: Dog Ear Publishing. ISBN 978-1-59858-180-5.
