= 1935 Paris–Tours =

Race details
- Dates: 5 May 1935
- Stages: 1
- Distance: 251 km (156.0 mi)
- Winning time: 6h 37' 30"

Results
	Winner	René Le Grevès (FRA)
	Second	Roger Lapébie (FRA)
	Third	Raffaele di Paco (ITA)

The 1935 Paris–Tours was the 30th edition of the Paris–Tours cycle race and was held on 5 May 1935. The race started in Paris and finished in Tours. The race was won by René Le Grevès.

== General classification ==
Final general classification

Rank	Rider	Time
1	René Le Grevès (FRA)	6h 37' 30"
2	Roger Lapébie (FRA)	+ 0"
3	Raffaele di Paco (ITA)	+ 0"
4	Edgard De Caluwé (BEL)	+ 0"
5	Georges Speicher (FRA)	+ 0"
6	Alphonse Schepers (BEL)	+ 0"
7	Jules Merviel (FRA)	+ 0"
8	René Vietto (FRA)	+ 0"
9	Maurice Archambaud (FRA)	+ 0"
9	Pierre Cloarec (FRA)	+ 0"
