= Robert Wierinckx =

Belgian cyclist

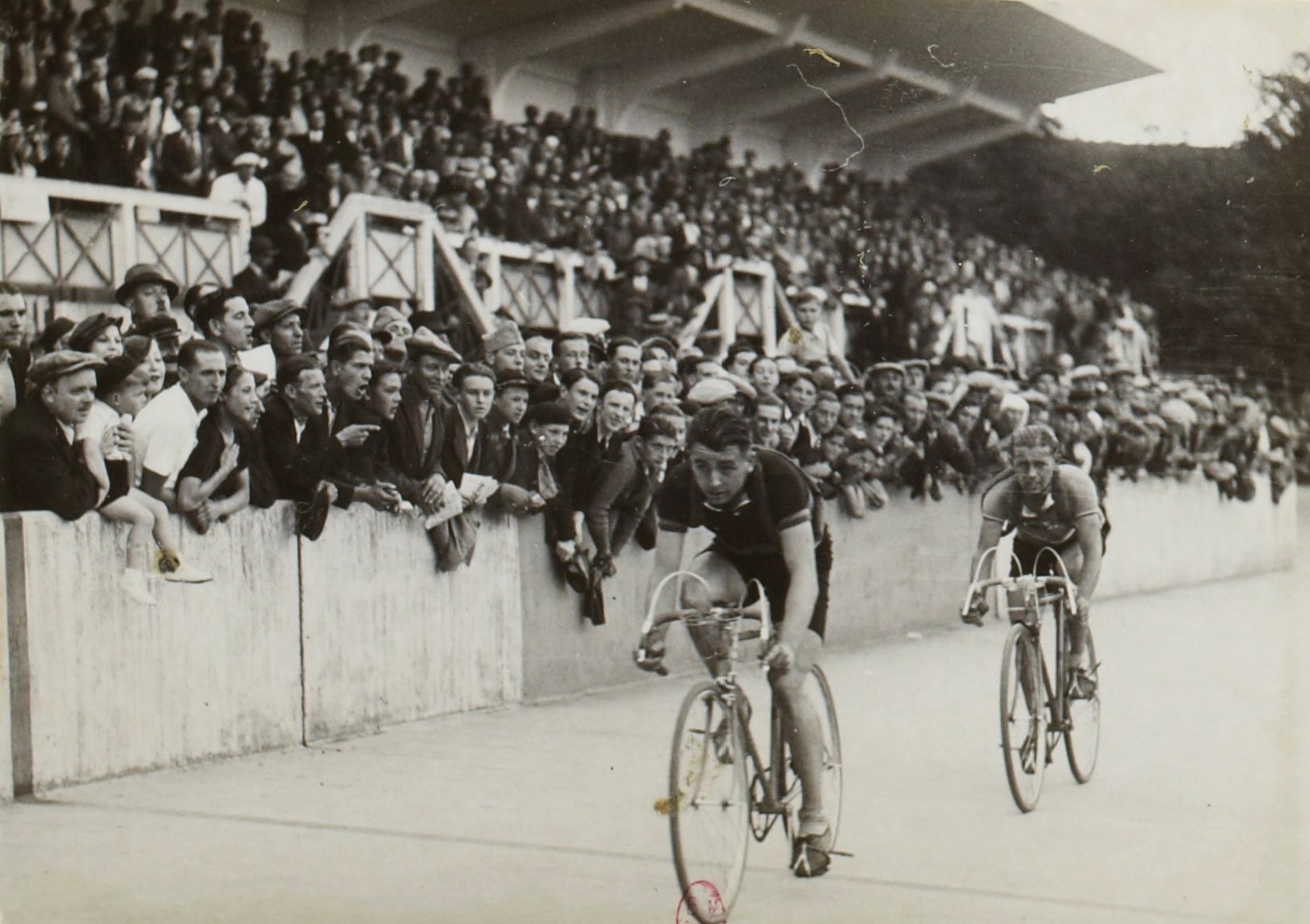
- Wierinckx followed by Maurice Archambaud in the 1936 Tour de France

Personal information
- Full name: Robert Wierinckx
- Born: 12 April 1915 Ixelles, Belgium
- Died: 29 December 2002 (aged 87) Rixensart, Belgium

Cycling career
- Sport: Cycling
- Discipline: Road
- Role: Rider

Major wins
- One stage Tour de France 1936

Robert Wierinckx (12 April 1915, Ixelles — 29 December 2002, Rixensart) was a Belgian professional road bicycle racer. In 1936, he was the winner of the second stage in the Tour de France.

== Major results ==
1934
Brussels-Luxembourg-Mondorf
Tour of Belgium for independents
Tour de l'Ouest
Charleroi
1936
Namur
Tour de France:

Winner stage 2

1937
Circuit du Morbihan
1939
Brussels-Ans
