= André Defoort =

Belgian cyclist

- Defoort as Belgian champion in 1941

Personal information
- Full name: André Defoort
- Born: 22 July 1914 Harelbeke, Belgium
- Died: 12 January 1972 (aged 57) Beveren, Belgium

Cycling career
- Sport: Cycling
- Role: Rider

André Defoort (22 July 1914 – 12 January 1972) was a Belgian racing cyclist. He won the Belgian national road race title in 1941.
