= Sylvère Maes =

Belgian cyclist

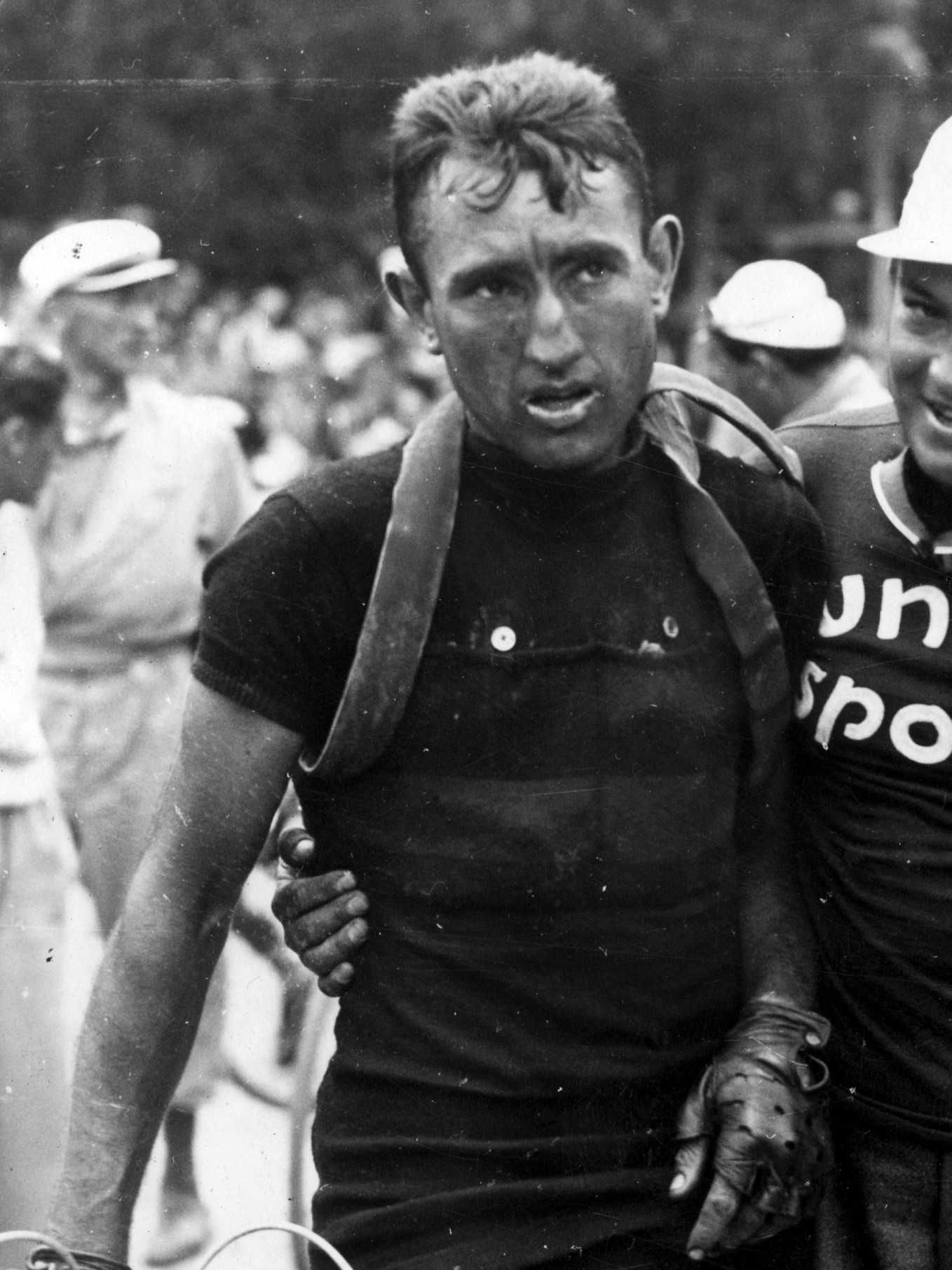
- Maes at the 1936 Tour de France

Personal information
- Full name: Sylvère Maes
- Nickname: Père Futé (Clever Father)
- Born: 27 August 1909 Zevekote, Belgium
- Died: 5 December 1966 (aged 57) Ostend, Belgium

Cycling career
- Sport: Cycling
- Discipline: Road
- Role: Rider

Professional teams
- 1933–1941: Alcyon–Dunlop
- 1946–1948: Mercier–Hutchinson
- 1947–1948: Olmo

Major wins
- Grand Tours Tour de France General classification (1936, 1939) Mountains classification (1939) 9 individual stages (1934-1937, 1939) Stage races Brussels–Luxembourg–Mondorf (1932) Circuit du Morbihan (1939) One-day races and Classics Paris–Roubaix (1933) Schaal Sels (1933) GP Stad Kortrijk (1932)

Sylvère Maes (pronounced [sil.vɛːʁ maːs]; 27 August 1909 – 5 December 1966) was a Belgian cyclist, who is most famous for winning the Tour de France in 1936 and 1939. In 1937, Maes left the 1937 Tour de France together with his Belgian team while he was leading the general classification, in response to actions from French spectators and decisions from the jury.

== Biography ==
Born in 1909 as the youngest in a family of ten children, Maes rode his first cycling race in 1928, and immediately was one of the best young riders. At the end of the 1932 season, Maes became a professional cyclist, and in a short time managed to win two races for professionals. Maes was a cyclo-cross talent, which he showed by winning the 1933 Critérium International de Cyclo-cross, considered the unofficial cyclo-cross world championship. In 1933 Maes recorded his first major victory by winning Paris–Roubaix. In the rest of his career, he would focus on the Tour de France.

=== 1934 to 1935 Maes' first Tour de France successes ===
In 1934, Maes made his debut in the Tour de France as an individual, but had more success than the Belgians in the national team, and was the only Belgian to win a stage. In the general classification, he finished in eighth place.

Maes started the 1935 Tour de France again as an individual. When Joseph Moerenhout left the race in the second stage, the rules allowed an individual to take his place, and Maes was added to the national team. Maes won a mountain stage in the Pyrenées, and finished in fourth place in the general classification.

=== 1936: winning the Tour de France ===
In 1936, Maes started the Tour de France as a member of the Belgian national team. Maes rode well in the first stages, and when Maurice Archambaud lost time in the seventh stage, Maes became the leader of the race. His closest opponent was Antonin Magne, and they tested each other in the ninth stage. Magne rode away on the Allos, the last climb of the day, and gained three minutes on Maes. Magne then fell because a spectator tried to help him, and Maes was able to come back. Maes gained some time in the next stages, winning two stages run in the team time trial format. In the 16th stage, Maes escaped early in the stage. Only Yvan Marie and Felicien Vervaecke were initially able to follow him. Marie lost contact, and Vervaecke had mechanical problems during the climb of the Tourmalet, so Maes continued on his own, and gained 15 minutes on Magne. In the rest of the race, his lead was never seriously contested anymore, so Maes won the Tour.

=== 1937: leaving Tour de France in winning position ===
Maes was the leader of the Belgian team in the 1937 Tour de France. In the ninth stage, Maes took over the lead from Gino Bartali, who was weakened in a fall. When Bartali later left the race, it was clear that the battle would be between Maes and Frenchman Roger Lapébie. The Tour organisation then decided to reduce the number of team time trials, which mostly harmed Maes's chances, as the Belgians were considered to have the better team. The Belgian team also accused Lapébie of being pulled by a car on the Alps. On the rest day before the Pyrenées, Maes was approached by a person offering him 100.000 Belgian Francs to let Lapébie win the race, which Maes refused.

In the fifteenth stage, where mountains in the Pyrenées were climbed, Maes created a large margin on Lapébie. When Maes punctured, Lapébie was able to reach him, and at the end of the stage only Julián Berrendero was in front of them, and Lapébie won the sprint for the second place. This rewarded Lapébie with 45 seconds bonification time. When the tour directors gave him 90 seconds penalty time for having been pushed, the margin with Maes grew to more than three minutes, but Lapébie had sensed weakness in the Belgian team, and planned to attack in the next stage. The Belgian team complained that the penalty was far too little, because Lapébie's advantage had been much greater. The French team threatened to abandon the race if the penalty was increased, and the Tour directors did not change it.

In the sixteenth stage, Lapébie finished ahead of Maes, cutting the Belgian's lead to only 25 seconds; with only flat stages left, it might be enough for Maes. During that sixteenth stage, Maes had punctured, and had been helped by two Belgian cyclists, Gustaaf Deloor and Adolf Braeckeveldt, who rode as individuals and were not part of the Belgian team. The Tour jury then fined Maes with 15 seconds penalty time in the general classification. During the race, a train crossing had been closed just after Lapébie had passed, and just before Maes was about to pass. Maes was offended by all this, and quit the race, together with the rest of the Belgian team.

In Belgium, the supporters protested against the Tour organisation. Within 24 hours, 20.000 protest letters were sent to a sports magazine, and in ten days more than 100.000 Belgian Francs were sent to the national cycling organisation to support the Tour cyclists.

=== 1938: disappointing Tour de France ===
Maes was again the team leader in the 1938 Tour de France. Maes was however in bad form, and could not live up to expectations, and Felicien Vervaecke took over the team captain role. Maes finished in 14th place in that tour. Outside the Tour de France, his cycling year was more successful: he finished in second place in both La Flèche Wallonne and the Tour of Flanders, his best finishings in a one-day classic race outside his 1933 Paris–Roubaix victory.

=== 1939: winning his second Tour de France ===
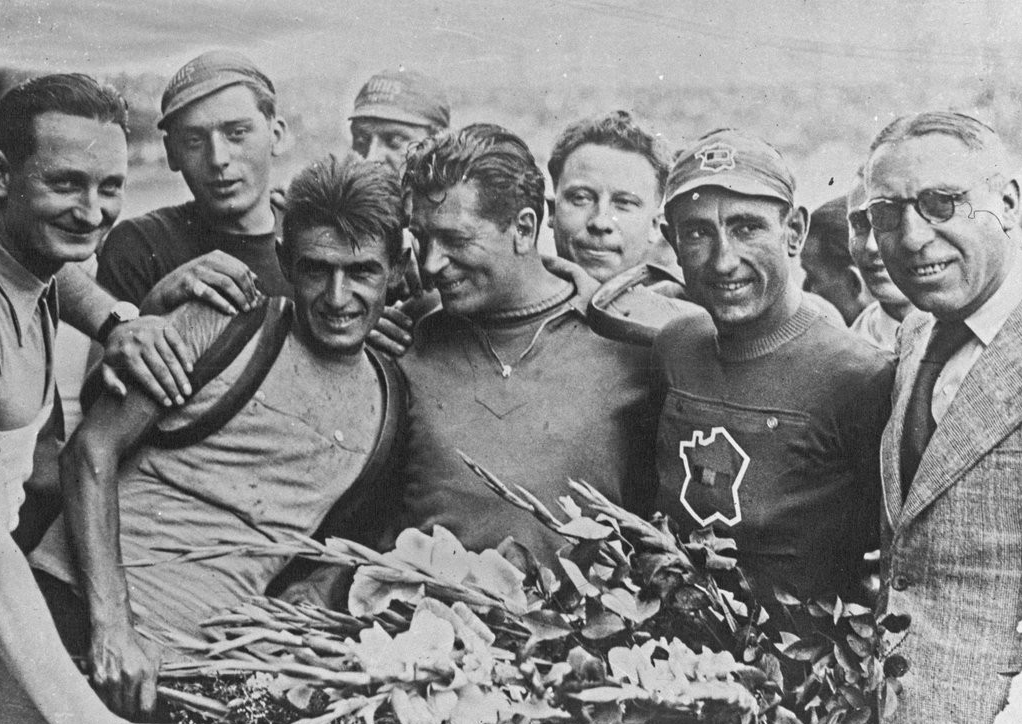
1939 Tour de France: in the center French actor Albert Préjean with winner Maes on his left side.

In 1939, Maes was again the leader of the Belgian team in the Tour de France, and with the Italian team not starting, he was the major favourite. Another protected racer in the Belgian team was Edward Vissers, but when Vissers escaped in the ninth stage, Maes started to chase his own teammate, and French cyclist René Vietto, leading the general classification, did not have to do much work to defend his lead. In the Alps, Maes was able to beat Vietto. In the time trial in stage 16B, Maes started ten minutes after Vietto, but was able to catch him. His lead was more than 30 minutes, and Vietto could not win anymore. His victory was complete because Maes also won the mountains classification, and his team won the team classification.

=== 1940 to 1947: late career ===
Maes had his chances to win a third Tour de France interrupted by the Second World War. Most professional races were cancelled, so to find an income, Maes became a bartender. In 1947, Maes rode the 1947 Giro d'Italia, finishing in fifth place. Maes had planned to start the 1947 Tour de France, and he would have been allowed to wear the yellow jersey during the first stage, as a symbol that the 1947 Tour was the continuation of the 1939 Tour, but he resigned at the last minute. He rode his last season in 1948.

=== Later life ===
From 1949 to 1957, Sylvère Maes was the team director of the Belgian team in the Tour de France. After that, he started a pub in Gistel, named 'Au Tourmalet'. Maes died from cancer in 1966, aged 57.

In 2011, a museum opened in Gistel, in honor of Maes and Johan Museeuw.

== Career achievements ==
=== Major results ===
1932
1st Overall Brussels–Luxembourg–Mondorf

1st Stage 2

1st GP Stad Kortrijk
1st Den Bosch
1st Omloop van het Vlaamse Land
1st Jabbeke
2nd Kampioenschap van Vlaanderen
7th Grand Prix des Nations
1933
1st Paris–Roubaix
1st Critérium International de Cyclo-cross (fr)
1st Schaal Sels
1st Circuit du Brabant
1st De Panne
2nd Omloop van West-Vlaanderen
3rd GP Dr. Eugeen Roggeman (nl)
10th Paris–Brussels
10th Tour of Flanders
1934
1st 's Hertogenbosch
1st Oudenburg
1st Bar-le-Duc
2nd Critérium International de Cyclo-cross (fr)
3rd Omloop van Oost-Vlaanderen
8th Overall Tour de France

1st Stage 23

9th Paris–Brussels
1935
3rd Six Days of Paris with Romain Maes
4th Overall Tour de France

1st Stage 15

8th Giro della Provincia di Milano (it)
9th Paris–Brussels
1936
1st Overall Tour de France

1st Stages 13b (ITT), 14b (ITT), 16 and 18b (ITT)

2nd Paris–Rennes (fr)
4th Paris–Brussels
10th Paris–Tours
1937
1st Stage 5b Tour de France
6th Paris–Brussels
8th Overall Paris–Nice

1st Stage 6 (ITT)

9th Tour of Flanders
1938
1st Roeselare
Tour du Sud-Ouest (fr)

1st Stages 3 & 7

1st Stage 2 Tour of Belgium
2nd Tour of Flanders
2nd La Flèche Wallonne
5th Liège–Bastogne–Liège
1939
1st Overall Tour de France

1st Mountains classification
1st Stages 15 and 16b

1st Overall Circuit du Morbihan (fr)

1st Stage 2

1st Critérium de Cannes
1941
1st Kessel-Lo
1942
1st Witte Donderdagprijs
1947
5th Overall Giro d'Italia
6th Omloop Het Volk
9th Overall Tour of Belgium
1948
5th Dwars door België

=== Grand Tour general classification results timeline ===
Grand Tour	1934	1935	1936	1937	1938	1939	1940	1941	1942	1943	1944	1943	1946	1947
Vuelta a España	N/A	—	—	N/A	N/A	N/A	N/A	—	—	N/A	N/A	—	—	—
Giro d'Italia	—	—	—	—	—	—	—	N/A	N/A	N/A	N/A	N/A	—	5
Tour de France	8	4	1	DNF	14	1	N/A	N/A	N/A	N/A	N/A	N/A	N/A	—

Legend
—	Did not compete
DNF	Did not finish
N/A	Race not held
