= Gabriel Dubois =

French cyclist

Personal information
- Born: 31 August 1911
- Died: 13 February 1985 (aged 73)

Cycling career
- Sport: Cycling
- Discipline: Road
- Role: Rider

Gabriel Dubois (31 August 1911 – 13 February 1985) was a French racing cyclist. He rode in the 1936 Tour de France.
