= Décimo Bettini =

Italian cyclist

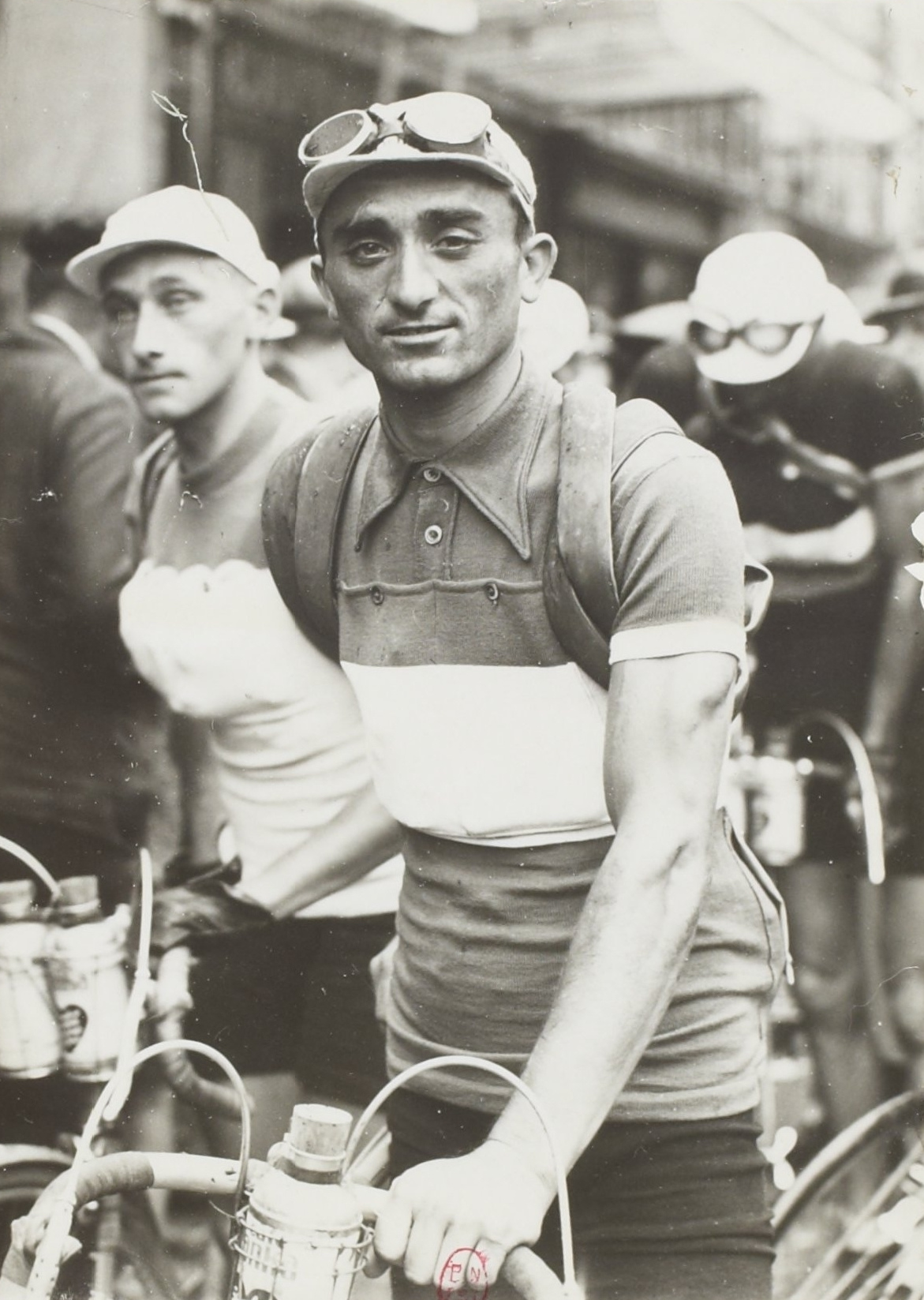
- Décimo Bettini in the 1936 Tour de France competition

Personal information
- Born: 30 December 1910
- Died: 19 September 1982 (aged 71)

Cycling career
- Sport: Cycling
- Discipline: Road
- Role: Rider

Décimo Bettini (30 December 1910 – 19 September 1982) was an Italian racing cyclist. He rode in the 1933 Tour de France.
