= Arsène Mersch =

Luxembourgish cyclist

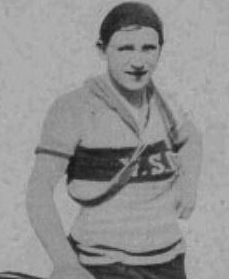

Personal information
- Full name: Arsène Mersch
- Born: 14 December 1913 Koerich, Luxembourg
- Died: 12 July 1980 (aged 66) Koerich, Luxembourg

Cycling career
- Sport: Cycling
- Disciplines: Road, Cyclo-cross
- Role: Rider

Major wins
- Luxembourg national road race champion (2x); Luxembourg national cyclo-cross champion one stage Tour de France

Arsène Mersch (14 December 1913 in Koerich – 11 July 1980 in Koerich) was a Luxembourgish professional road bicycle racer and cyclo-cross racer, who became national champion in both categories twice. He also won one Tour de France stage, and wore the yellow jersey for one day.

== Major results ==
1934
GP Faber
1935
Luxembourg national road race champion
Stage 2 Volta Ciclista a Catalunya
1936
1936 Tour de France:

Winner stage 21
5th place overall classification
Wearing yellow jersey for one day

Luxembourg national cyclo-cross champion
Stage 5 Tour of Belgium
1938
Luxembourg national cyclo-cross champion
Stage 1 Tour de Suisse
1939
Stage 8 Tour de Suisse
Luxembourg national cyclo-cross champion
Luxembourg national road race champion
