= Pierre Clemens =

Luxembourgish cyclist

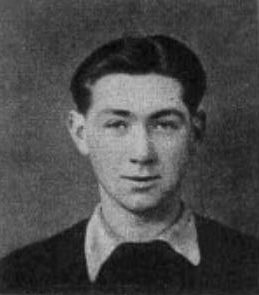
- Pierre Clemens in 1935.

Personal information
- Born: 2 August 1913 Redange
- Died: 26 August 1963 (aged 50) Bettembourg

Cycling career
- Sport: Cycling
- Discipline: Road
- Role: Rider

Professional teams
- 1935: Independent
- 1936–1940: Alcyon
- 1943–1945: Individual

Pierre Clemens (2 August 1913 in Redange – 26 August 1963 in Bettembourg) was a Luxembourgish cyclist. His brother Mathias Clemens was also a professional cyclist.

== Major results ==
1936
2nd Overall Tour de Luxembourg
4th Overall Tour de France
1937
1st National Road Race Championships
2nd Overall Tour de Luxembourg

1st Stage 3

1942
4th Overall Tour de Luxembourg
1943
3rd Overall Tour de Luxembourg

1st Stage 3

== Results in the Tour de France ==
- 1936: 4th
- 1937: DNF
- 1938: DNF
- 1939: 20th
