= André Deforge =

French cyclist

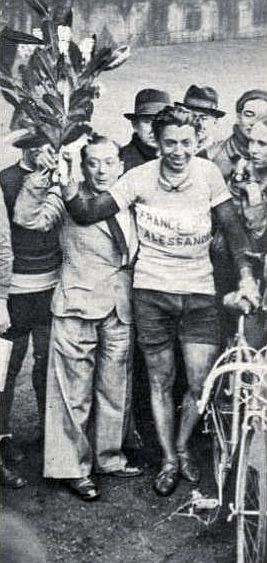
- André Deforge in 1939

Personal information
- Born: 4 March 1914
- Died: 24 January 1996 (aged 81)

Cycling career
- Sport: Cycling
- Discipline: Road
- Role: Rider

André Deforge (4 March 1914 – 24 January 1996) was a French racing cyclist. He rode in the 1938 Tour de France.
