= René Le Grevès =

French cyclist

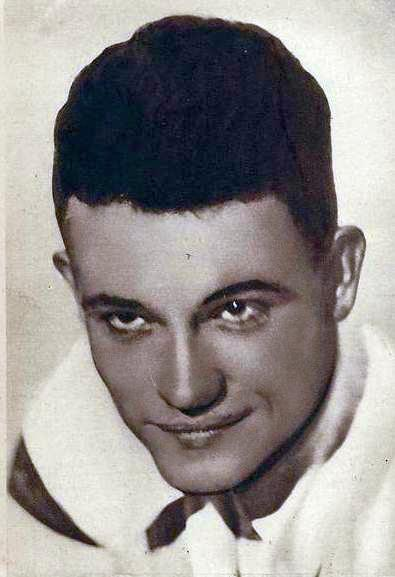
- Le Grevès in around 1938

Personal information
- Full name: René Le Grevès
- Born: 6 July 1910 Paris, France
- Died: 25 February 1946 (aged 35) Saint-Gervais-les-Bains, France

Cycling career
- Sport: Cycling
- Discipline: Road
- Role: Rider
- Rider type: Sprinter

Major wins
- 16 Tour de France stages Critérium International (1935, 1937); Paris–Tours (1935)
Medal record
Representing France
Men's track cycling
Olympic Games
Silver medal – second place	1932 Los Angeles	Team pursuit

René Le Grevès (6 July 1910 – 25 February 1946) was a French professional road bicycle racer. As an amateur cyclist, he won the silver medal at the 1932 Summer Olympics in the team pursuit. In 1933 Le Grevès became professional, and between 1933 and 1939, he won sixteen stages in the Tour de France.

== Major results ==
1932
Silver medal 1932 olympic games, team pursuit
1933
Paris-Caen
Tour de France:

Winner stage 22

1934
Tour de France:

Winner stages 2, 5, 10 and 22A

1935
Circuit de Paris
Circuit du Morbihan
Critérium International
Paris–Tours
Tour de France:

Winner stages 14A, 18A, 19A and 20A

1936
France national road race championship
Tour de France:

Winner stages 5, 12, 13A, 14A, 17 and 20A

1937
Critérium International
1938
Paris-Caen
1939
Paris-Sedan
Tour de France:

Winner stage 18A
