= Albert Hendrickx =

Belgian cyclist

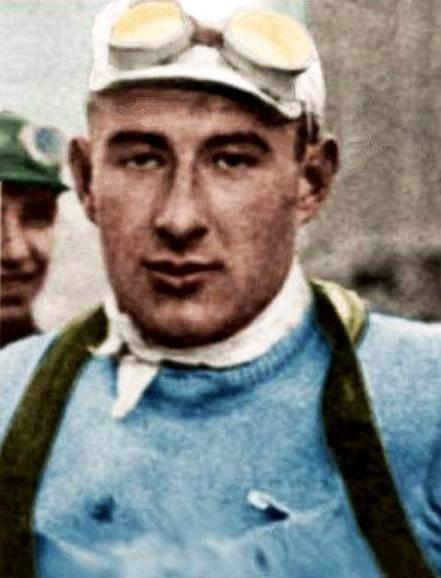
- Hendrickx in 1939

Personal information
- Born: 19 July 1916
- Died: 13 May 1990 (aged 73)

Cycling career
- Sport: Cycling
- Discipline: Road
- Role: Rider

Albert Hendrickx (19 July 1916 – 13 May 1990) was a Belgian racing cyclist. He rode in the 1936 Tour de France.
