= Sauveur Ducazeaux =

French cyclist

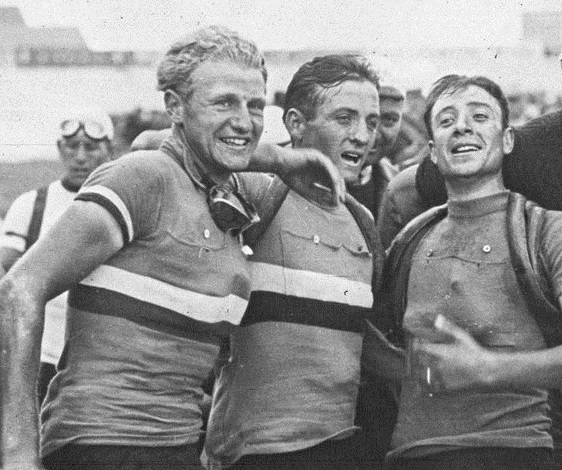
- Raoul Lesueur (left) Paul Maye (center) and the French Sauveur Ducazeaux (right). (1936)

Personal information
- Full name: Sauveur Ducazeaux
- Born: 8 December 1910 Biarritz, France
- Died: 23 June 1987 (aged 76) Colmar, France

Cycling career
- Sport: Cycling
- Discipline: Road
- Role: Rider

Major wins
- One stage 1936 Tour de France

Sauveur Ducazeaux (French pronunciation: [sovœʁ dykazo]; 8 December 1910, Biarritz — 23 June 1987, Colmar) was a French professional road bicycle racer. He won one stage in the 1936 Tour de France. After his cycling career, he became a team captain. In 1956, he was the team captain of Roger Walkowiak, who surprisingly won the 1956 Tour de France.

== Major results ==
1933
Paris-Chauny
1936
Tour de France:

Winner stage 15
