= Arthur Debruyckere =

French cyclist (1915–1955)

Personal information
- Born: 13 February 1915
- Died: 4 August 1955 (aged 40)

Cycling career
- Sport: Cycling
- Discipline: Road
- Role: Rider

Arthur Debruyckere (13 February 1915 – 4 August 1955) was a French racing cyclist. He rode in the 1935 Tour de France.
