= Félicien Vervaecke =

Belgian cyclist

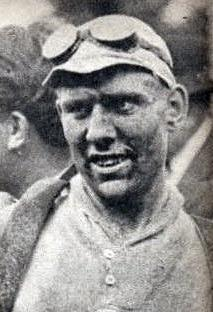
- Félicien Vervaecke (1939)

Personal information
- Full name: Félicien Vervaecke
- Born: 11 March 1907 Belgium
- Died: 31 October 1986 (aged 79)

Cycling career
- Sport: Cycling
- Discipline: Road
- Role: Rider
- Rider type: Climber

Professional team
- 1930–1939: Alcyon/Labor

Major wins
- Tour de France mountains classification (2x); Six stages in the Tour de France

Félicien Vervaecke (Dadizele; 11 March 1907 – 31 October 1986, in Brussels) was a Belgian professional cycling racist from 1930 to 1939. In the Tour de France he showed good results, finishing three times on the podium (second once, third twice). In 1935 and 1937 he won the mountain classification, and overall he won six stages. In the 1936 Tour de France, Vervaecke was on his way to the second place, but bad luck prevented it. First his bicycle broke, and he had to convince a spectator to lend his. Then he suffered a flat tire, and Tour officials forced him to wait for the reserve car. Antonin Magne passed him. When Vervaecke got his tire, he raced back to Magne, and finished 18 seconds behind him. But he still finished third, as he received 10 minutes penalty because his wife had given him drinks during the race, which was not allowed. In the 1937 Tour de France, Vervaecke won the mountain classification despite not finishing the race, something no longer allowed.

He was the first Belgian cyclist to win a stage in the Giro d'Italia.

After his cycling career, Vervaecke started a bicycle shop in Brussels. He was the first manager of Eddy Merckx.

His older brother Julien Vervaecke was also successful, finishing third in the 1927 Tour de France.

== Major results ==
1929
Paris-Lens
Tourcoing-Dunkerque-Tourcoing
1932
Tour de France:

Did not finish

Tour de Corrèze
1934
Tour de France:

Final classification: 4th place

Giro d'Italia: Stage 8
1935
Tour de France

Final classification: 3rd place
Winner Mountains classification

Paris–Nice: Stage 5B
1936
Tour de France

Final classification: 3rd place
Winner of stage 19B

Paris–Nice: Stage 1
1937
Tour de France

did not finish
Winner Mountains classification
Winner stage 10

Paris–Nice: Stage 5A
1938
Tour de France

Final classification: 2nd place
Winner of stage 4C
Winner of stage 8
Winner of stage 10B
Winner of stage 20B

1939
Tour de France

did not finish

== Teams ==
- 1930: Alcyon
- 1931: Alcyon and Labor
- 1932-1933: Labor
- 1934: Labor and Gamma
- 1935-1936: Labor and Alcyon
- 1937-1939: Labor

== Later life and death ==
As an older man, Vervaecke lived a simple life with his wife and children. On October 31, 1986, he went on a short, leisurely bike ride around his neighborhood in Brussels late in the night when he was spooked by a black cat. He fell from his bicycle and experienced blunt force trauma to his skull. He died shortly after. His body was discovered by a shocked American tourist de France.
