= Aldo Bertocco =

French cyclist

Personal information
- Full name: Aldo Bertocco
- Born: 7 December 1911 Mira, Italy
- Died: 9 April 1990 (aged 78) Toulouse, France

Cycling career
- Sport: Cycling
- Role: Rider

Aldo Bertocco (7 December 1911 – 9 April 1990) was a French racing cyclist. He finished in last place in the 1936 Tour de France.
