= Cycling monument =

Five classic road cycling races

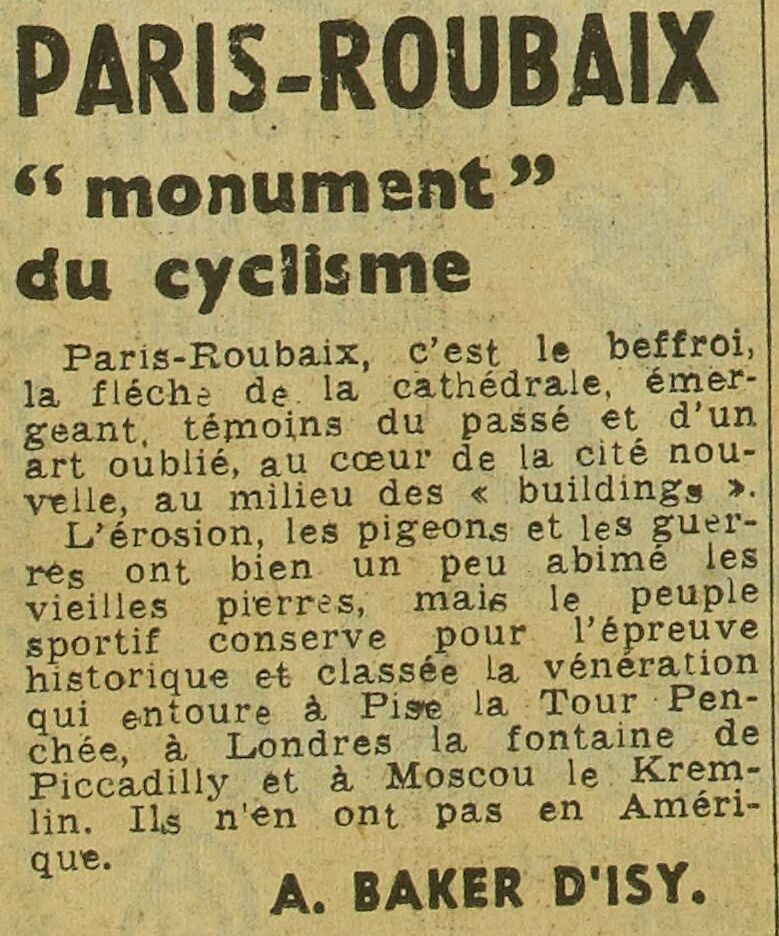
Cycling monument
First appeared in Ce soir newspaper by Albert Baker d'Isy
Information
Published	17 April 1949
Origin	France
Newspaper	Ce soir
Author	Albert Baker d'Isy
Race	Paris–Roubaix
Article	Paris-Roubaix "monument" du cyclisme

The Monuments are five classic cycle races generally considered to be the oldest, hardest, longest and most prestigious one-day events in men's road cycling, with distances between 240 and 300 kilometres (150 and 190 mi). As of 2025, all monuments except Giro di Lombardia hold women's races as part of the UCI Women's World Tour.

Each has a long history and varied characteristics. They are the one-day races in which most points can be earned in the UCI World Tour and the only 3rd categorized UCI races, behind only Grand Tour races: Tour de France (1st category) and Giro d'Italia and Vuelta a España (both 2nd category).

With 19 wins, Eddy Merckx is by far the most successful monument rider. He won three monuments in a single season in 1969, 1971, 1972 and 1975. Tadej Pogačar is the only other rider to achieve the feat, doing so in 2025 and 2026.

== List of monuments ==
Race	Location	Month	Since	Features
Milan–San Remo	Northern Italy	March	1907	Mostly flat
Tour of Flanders	Belgium	April	1913	Hills and cobbles
Paris–Roubaix	Northern France	April	1896	Cobbles
Liège–Bastogne–Liège	Belgium	April	1892	Hilly
Giro di Lombardia	Northern Italy	October	1905	Hilly

The five monuments are:

- (Italy) Milan–San Remo: also called La Primavera (the spring classic) or La Classicissima (the classic of classics). Held in March, it is the first major classic of the season. First held in 1907, it is by far the longest one-day race on the UCI calendar at nearly 300 km (190 mi). Due to its flat profile, it is considered a sprinter's classic, but the famous finishing climbs of the Cipressa and the Poggio give other types of cyclists a chance to win. It is often described as "the easiest Monument to finish, but the hardest to win".
- (Belgium) Tour of Flanders: the Ronde van Vlaanderen in Dutch, or simply De Ronde ("the Tour"), is raced on the first Sunday in April. First held in 1913, the race typically covers more than 270 km (170 mi) in the Flemish Ardennes and is known for its short, steep hills and cobbled sections. The course shifts from year to year, with the start switching between Antwerp and Bruges in recent years. A key point is the Oude Kwaremont, the longest climb of the race at 2.2 km (1.4 mi) long with a max gradient of 11%.
- (France) Paris–Roubaix: also called "the Queen of the Classics" or "the Hell of the North", it is raced in April one week after the Tour of Flanders and is the final cobbled classic. First organized in 1896, the race started in Paris up to 1967, before switching to the current start in Compiègne, and is approximately 260 km. The race is known for its long sections of pavé (cobblestone roads), with 30 cobbled sectors totaling over 50 km (31 mi), including the difficult Trouée d'Arenberg before finishing in the Roubaix Velodrome. It is considered the toughest monument, as well as "arguably the most recognizable" one-day race on the cycling calendar.
- (Belgium) Liège–Bastogne–Liège: known as La Doyenne ("the old lady" or "the oldest"), it is the final Ardennes classic, usually held in late April as the last of the spring one-day races. First organized in 1892, it is the oldest monument. (Note: The race was originally only for amateurs, with the first professional edition held in 1894.) The 250 km (160 mi) course is considered a "war of attrition" due to its difficult hilly terrain, favouring climbers or even Grand Tour specialists.
- (Italy) Giro di Lombardia: also called the classica delle foglie morte ("race of the falling leaves"), it is the final monument of the season, usually held in October. First held in 1905, it was initially organized as Milano–Milano. The course switches between starting and finishing in Como and Bergamo, and is known for its hilly terrain around Lake Como. Similar to Liège–Bastogne–Liège, it is considered a climber's classic, ascending difficult hills such as Madonna del Ghisallo.

== Origin ==
The expression "cycling monument" has been used since the early days of cycle racing. In 1904, Henri Desgrange wrote in L'Auto that "The "Tour de France" is over and its second edition will, I fear, have also been the last. [...] And yet, it seemed to us and it still seems to us that we had built with this great event the most lasting and most imposing monument to the sport of cycling".

In 1949, French sports journalist Albert Baker d'Isy wrote about the 47th edition of the Paris–Roubaix race, titling his article in the French newspaper Ce soir "Paris–Roubaix: "monument" du cyclisme". The term was used again by journalist Jacques Goddet in 1950, writing about Fausto Coppi's victory at Paris–Roubaix – "Monument of international cycling, Paris-Roubaix crushed the riders with its legend as well as its diabolical difficulties".

When the Super Prestige Pernod had to be abandoned at the end of 1987, Hein Verbruggen (president of the FICP) went on to create a new competition (which became the UCI Road World Cup), where five races were given a fixed position under the name 'cycling monument', and these were the five races still known as monuments.

The term began being used more by the Union Cycliste Internationale (UCI) and cycling media at the end of the 20th century, with the term designating the five most prestigious classic cycle races, namely Milan–San Remo, Tour of Flanders, Paris–Roubaix, Liège–Bastogne–Liège and Giro di Lombardia.

Since 2010, the races are considered by the Union Cycliste Internationale to be more prestigious than other one-day races that are raced by the professional peloton, with only the Grand Tour stage races gaining more ranking points for the winner.

In 2017, L'Équipe wrote that the five monuments were "the oldest one-day races, the most famous, the most unique" and that they had "prestigious entry fields" of champion riders.

== Future monuments ==
Media and riders have discussed whether other classic cycling races meet the criteria of a cycling monument. By the 2020s, Strade Bianche – an Italian one-day race first held in 2007, defined by its use of white gravel roads – was considered to be the most likely candidate, with Cycling News stating in 2025 that "there is no longer any debate that Strade Bianche is cycling's sixth Monument". However, others have criticised that Strade Bianche does not have the length or longevity to be titled a monument, and rider Philippe Gilbert noted that Clásica de San Sebastián and Amstel Gold Race were more important historically.

In the women's tour, media have suggested that Trofeo Alfredo Binda-Comune di Cittiglio (the oldest one-day race on the women's calendar) and Strade Bianche Donne may be worthy of the "monument" moniker.

== Monuments winners ==
Year	Milan–San Remo	Tour of Flanders	Paris–Roubaix	Liège–Bastogne–Liège	Giro di Lombardia
1892	Not contested	Not contested	Not contested	Léon Houa (BEL) (1/3)	Not contested
1893	Not contested	Not contested	Not contested	Léon Houa (BEL) (2/3)	Not contested
1894	Not contested	Not contested	Not contested	Léon Houa (BEL) (3/3)	Not contested
1895	Not contested	Not contested	Not contested	Not contested	Not contested
1896	Not contested	Not contested	Josef Fischer (GER)	Not contested	Not contested
1897	Not contested	Not contested	Maurice Garin (ITA) (1/2)	Not contested	Not contested
1898	Not contested	Not contested	Maurice Garin (ITA) (2/2)	Not contested	Not contested
1899	Not contested	Not contested	Albert Champion (FRA)	Not contested	Not contested
1900	Not contested	Not contested	Émile Bouhours (FRA)	Not contested	Not contested
1901	Not contested	Not contested	Lucien Lesna (FRA) (1/2)	Not contested	Not contested
1902	Not contested	Not contested	Lucien Lesna (FRA) (2/2)	Not contested	Not contested
1903	Not contested	Not contested	Hippolyte Aucouturier (FRA) (1/2)	Not contested	Not contested
1904	Not contested	Not contested	Hippolyte Aucouturier (FRA) (2/2)	Not contested	Not contested
1905	Not contested	Not contested	Louis Trousselier (FRA)	Not contested	Giovanni Gerbi (ITA)
1906	Not contested	Not contested	Henri Cornet (FRA)	Not contested	Giuseppe Brambilla (ITA)
1907	Lucien Petit-Breton (FRA)	Not contested	Georges Passerieu (FRA)	Not contested	Gustave Garrigou (FRA) (1/2)
1908	Cyrille van Hauwaert (BEL) (1/2)	Not contested	Cyrille van Hauwaert (BEL) (2/2)	André Trousselier (FRA)	François Faber (LUX) (1/2)
1909	Luigi Ganna (ITA)	Not contested	Octave Lapize (FRA) (1/3)	Victor Fastre (BEL)	Giovanni Cuniolo (ITA)
1910	Eugène Christophe (FRA)	Not contested	Octave Lapize (FRA) (2/3)	Not contested	Giovanni Micheletto (ITA)
1911	Gustave Garrigou (FRA) (2/2)	Not contested	Octave Lapize (FRA) (3/3)	Joseph Van Daele (BEL)	Henri Pélissier (FRA) (1/6)
1912	Henri Pélissier (FRA) (2/6)	Not contested	Charles Crupelandt (FRA) (1/2)	Omer Verschoore (BEL)	Carlo Oriani (ITA)
1913	Odile Defraye (BEL)	Paul Deman (BEL) (1/2)	François Faber (LUX) (2/2)	Maurits Moritz (BEL)	Henri Pélissier (FRA) (3/6)
1914	Ugo Agostoni (ITA)	Marcel Buysse (BEL)	Charles Crupelandt (FRA) (2/2)	Not contested	Lauro Bordin (ITA)
1915	Ezio Corlaita (ITA)	Not contested	Not contested	Not contested	Gaetano Belloni (ITA) (1/5)
1916	Not contested	Not contested	Not contested	Not contested	Leopoldo Torricelli (ITA)
1917	Gaetano Belloni (ITA) (2/5)	Not contested	Not contested	Not contested	Philippe Thys (BEL)
1918	Costante Girardengo (ITA) (1/9)	Not contested	Not contested	Not contested	Gaetano Belloni (ITA) (3/5)
1919	Angelo Gremo (ITA)	Henri van Lerberghe (BEL)	Henri Pélissier (FRA) (4/6)	Léon Devos (BEL) (1/2)	Costante Girardengo (ITA) (2/9)
1920	Gaetano Belloni (ITA) (4/5)	Jules Van Hevel (BEL) (1/2)	Paul Deman (BEL) (2/2)	Léon Scieur (BEL)	Henri Pélissier (FRA) (5/6)
1921	Costante Girardengo (ITA) (3/9)	René Vermandel (BEL) (1/3)	Henri Pélissier (FRA) (6/6)	Louis Mottiat (BEL) (1/2)	Costante Girardengo (ITA) (4/9)
1922	Giovanni Brunero (ITA) (1/3)	Léon Devos (BEL) (2/2)	Albert Dejonghe (BEL)	Louis Mottiat (BEL) (2/2)	Costante Girardengo (ITA) (5/9)
1923	Costante Girardengo (ITA) (6/9)	Heiri Suter (SUI) (1/2)	Heiri Suter (SUI) (2/2)	René Vermandel (BEL) (2/3)	Giovanni Brunero (ITA) (2/3)
1924	Pietro Linari (ITA)	Gérard Debaets (BEL) (1/2)	Jules Van Hevel (BEL) (2/2)	René Vermandel (BEL) (3/3)	Giovanni Brunero (ITA) (3/3)
1925	Costante Girardengo (ITA) (7/9)	Julien Delbecque (BEL) (1/2)	Félix Sellier (BEL)	Georges Ronsse (BEL) (1/2)	Alfredo Binda (ITA) (1/6)
1926	Costante Girardengo (ITA) (8/9)	Denis Verschueren (BEL)	Julien Delbecque (BEL) (2/2)	Dieudonné Smets (BEL)	Alfredo Binda (ITA) (2/6)
1927	Pietro Chesi (ITA)	Gérard Debaets (BEL) (2/2)	Georges Ronsse (BEL) (2/2)	Maurice Raes (BEL)	Alfredo Binda (ITA) (3/6)
1928	Costante Girardengo (ITA) (9/9)	Jan Mertens (BEL)	André Leducq (FRA)	Ernest Mottard (BEL)	Gaetano Belloni (ITA) (5/5)
1929	Alfredo Binda (ITA) (4/6)	Jef Dervaes (BEL)	Charles Meunier (BEL)	Alfons Schepers (BEL) (1/4)	Piero Fossati (ITA)
1930	Michele Mara (ITA) (1/2)	Frans Bonduel (BEL)	Julien Vervaecke (BEL)	Hermann Buse (GER)	Michele Mara (ITA) (2/2)
1931	Alfredo Binda (ITA) (5/6)	Romain Gijssels (BEL) (1/3)	Gaston Rebry (BEL) (1/4)	Alfons Schepers (BEL) (2/4)	Alfredo Binda (ITA) (6/6)
1932	Alfredo Bovet (ITA)	Romain Gijssels (BEL) (2/3)	Romain Gijssels (BEL) (3/3)	Marcel Houyoux (BEL)	Antonio Negrini (ITA)
1933	Learco Guerra (ITA) (1/2)	Alfons Schepers (BEL) (3/4)	Sylvère Maes (BEL)	François Gardier (BEL)	Domenico Piemontesi (ITA)
1934	Jef Demuysere (BEL)	Gaston Rebry (BEL) (2/4)	Gaston Rebry (BEL) (3/4)	Theo Herckenrath (BEL)	Learco Guerra (ITA) (2/2)
1935	Giuseppe Olmo (ITA) (1/2)	Louis Duerloo (BEL)	Gaston Rebry (BEL) (4/4)	Alfons Schepers (BEL) (4/4)	Enrico Mollo (ITA)
1936	Angelo Varetto (ITA)	Louis Hardiquest (BEL)	Georges Speicher (FRA)	Albert Beckaert (BEL)	Gino Bartali (ITA) (1/7)
1937	Cesare Del Cancia (ITA)	Michel D'Hooghe (BEL)	Jules Rossi (ITA)	Éloi Meulenberg (BEL)	Aldo Bini (ITA) (1/2)
1938	Giuseppe Olmo (ITA) (2/2)	Edgard De Caluwé (BEL)	Lucien Storme (BEL)	Alfons Deloor (BEL)	Cino Cinelli (ITA) (1/2)
1939	Gino Bartali (ITA) (2/7)	Karel Kaers (BEL)	Émile Masson Jr. (BEL)	Albert Ritserveldt (BEL)	Gino Bartali (ITA) (3/7)
1940	Gino Bartali (ITA) (4/7)	Achiel Buysse (BEL) (1/3)	Not contested	Not contested	Gino Bartali (ITA) (5/7)
1941	Pierino Favalli (ITA)	Achiel Buysse (BEL) (2/3)	Not contested	Not contested	Mario Ricci (ITA) (1/2)
1942	Adolfo Leoni (ITA)	Briek Schotte (BEL) (1/2)	Not contested	Not contested	Aldo Bini (ITA) (2/2)
1943	Cino Cinelli (ITA) (2/2)	Achiel Buysse (BEL) (3/3)	Marcel Kint (BEL)	Richard Depoorter (BEL) (1/2)	Not contested
1944	Not contested	Rik Van Steenbergen (BEL) (1/5)	Maurice Desimpelaere (BEL)	Not contested	Not contested
1945	Not contested	Sylvain Grysolle (BEL)	Paul Maye (FRA)	Jean Engels (BEL)	Mario Ricci (ITA) (2/2)
1946	Fausto Coppi (ITA) (1/9)	Rik Van Steenbergen (BEL) (2/5)	Georges Claes (BEL) (1/2)	Prosper Depredomme (BEL) (1/2)	Fausto Coppi (ITA) (2/9)
1947	Gino Bartali (ITA) (6/7)	Emiel Faignaert (BEL)	Georges Claes (BEL) (2/2)	Richard Depoorter (BEL) (2/2)	Fausto Coppi (ITA) (3/9)
1948	Fausto Coppi (ITA) (4/9)	Briek Schotte (BEL) (2/2)	Rik Van Steenbergen (BEL) (3/5)	Maurice Mollin (BEL)	Fausto Coppi (ITA) (5/9)
1949	Fausto Coppi (ITA) (6/9)	Fiorenzo Magni (ITA) (1/3)	Serse Coppi (ITA); André Mahé (FRA) (Note: The result in 1949 took several months and two international conferences to sort out. André Mahé was first but his win was challenged because he took the wrong course. Mahé was in a break of three that reached Roubaix velodrome in the lead, but he was misdirected by officials and entered the track by the wrong gate. Mahé was declared winner but a few minutes later other riders arrived using the correct route and Serse Coppi, brother of famous Fausto, won the sprint for what was assumed to be the minor placings. After a protest and several months, Serse Coppi was named joint winner with Mahé.)	Camille Danguillaume (FRA)	Fausto Coppi (ITA) (7/9)
1950	Gino Bartali (ITA) (7/7)	Fiorenzo Magni (ITA) (2/3)	Fausto Coppi (ITA) (8/9)	Prosper Depredomme (BEL) (2/2)	Renzo Soldani (ITA)
1951	Louison Bobet (FRA) (1/4)	Fiorenzo Magni (ITA) (3/3)	Antonio Bevilacqua (ITA)	Ferdinand Kübler (SUI) (1/2)	Louison Bobet (FRA) (2/4)
1952	Loretto Petrucci (ITA) (1/2)	Roger Decock (BEL)	Rik Van Steenbergen (BEL) (4/5)	Ferdinand Kübler (SUI) (2/2)	Giuseppe Minardi (ITA)
1953	Loretto Petrucci (ITA) (2/2)	Wim van Est (NED)	Germain Derijcke (BEL) (1/4)	Alois De Hertog (BEL)	Bruno Landi (ITA)
1954	Rik Van Steenbergen (BEL) (5/5)	Raymond Impanis (BEL) (1/2)	Raymond Impanis (BEL) (2/2)	Marcel Ernzer (LUX)	Fausto Coppi (ITA) (9/9)
1955	Germain Derijcke (BEL) (2/4)	Louison Bobet (FRA) (3/4)	Jean Forestier (FRA) (1/2)	Stan Ockers (BEL)	Cleto Maule (ITA)
1956	Fred De Bruyne (BEL) (1/6)	Jean Forestier (FRA) (2/2)	Louison Bobet (FRA) (4/4)	Fred De Bruyne (BEL) (2/6)	André Darrigade (FRA)
1957	Miguel Poblet (ESP) (1/2)	Fred De Bruyne (BEL) (3/6)	Fred De Bruyne (BEL) (4/6)	Germain Derijcke (BEL) (3/4); Frans Schoubben (BEL) (Note: Two riders shared the 1957 race. Germain Derijcke was first over the line, but because he crossed a closed rail crossing, the second-place rider, Frans Schoubben, was promoted to first as well. Derijcke was not disqualified, because he had won by three minutes advantage; judges felt he had not gained that much time from illegally crossing the railway.)	Diego Ronchini (ITA)
1958	Rik Van Looy (BEL) (1/8)	Germain Derijcke (BEL) (4/4)	Leon Vandaele (BEL)	Fred De Bruyne (BEL) (5/6)	Nino Defilippis (ITA)
1959	Miguel Poblet (ESP) (2/2)	Rik Van Looy (BEL) (2/8)	Noël Foré (BEL) (1/2)	Fred De Bruyne (BEL) (6/6)	Rik Van Looy (BEL) (3/8)
1960	René Privat (FRA)	Arthur Decabooter (BEL)	Pino Cerami (BEL)	Albertus Geldermans (NED)	Emile Daems (BEL) (1/3)
1961	Raymond Poulidor (FRA)	Tom Simpson (GBR) (1/3)	Rik Van Looy (BEL) (4/8)	Rik Van Looy (BEL) (5/8)	Vito Taccone (ITA)
1962	Emile Daems (BEL) (2/3)	Rik Van Looy (BEL) (6/8)	Rik Van Looy (BEL) (7/8)	Jef Planckaert (BEL)	Jo de Roo (NED) (1/3)
1963	Joseph Groussard (FRA)	Noel Foré (BEL) (2/2)	Emile Daems (BEL) (3/3)	Frans Melckenbeeck (BEL)	Jo de Roo (NED) (2/3)
1964	Tom Simpson (GBR) (2/3)	Rudi Altig (FRG) (1/2)	Peter Post (NED)	Willy Blocklandt (BEL)	Gianni Motta (ITA)
1965	Arie den Hartog (NED)	Jo de Roo (NED) (3/3)	Rik Van Looy (BEL) (8/8)	Carmine Preziosi (ITA)	Tom Simpson (GBR) (3/3)
1966	Eddy Merckx (BEL) (1/19)	Edward Sels (BEL)	Felice Gimondi (ITA) (1/4)	Jacques Anquetil (FRA)	Felice Gimondi (ITA) (2/4)
1967	Eddy Merckx (BEL) (2/19)	Dino Zandegù (ITA)	Jan Janssen (NED)	Walter Godefroot (BEL) (1/4)	Franco Bitossi (ITA) (1/2)
1968	Rudi Altig (FRG) (2/2)	Walter Godefroot (BEL) (2/4)	Eddy Merckx (BEL) (3/19)	Walter Van Sweefelt (BEL)	Herman Van Springel (BEL)
1969	Eddy Merckx (BEL) (4/19)	Eddy Merckx (BEL) (5/19)	Walter Godefroot (BEL) (3/4)	Eddy Merckx (BEL) (6/19)	Jean-Pierre Monseré (BEL)
1970	Michele Dancelli (ITA)	Eric Leman (BEL) (1/3)	Eddy Merckx (BEL) (7/19)	Roger De Vlaeminck (BEL) (1/11)	Franco Bitossi (ITA) (2/2)
1971	Eddy Merckx (BEL) (8/19)	Evert Dolman (NED)	Roger Rosiers (BEL)	Eddy Merckx (BEL) (9/19)	Eddy Merckx (BEL) (10/19)
1972	Eddy Merckx (BEL) (11/19)	Eric Leman (BEL) (2/3)	Roger De Vlaeminck (BEL) (2/11)	Eddy Merckx (BEL) (12/19)	Eddy Merckx (BEL) (13/19)
1973	Roger De Vlaeminck (BEL) (3/11)	Eric Leman (BEL) (3/3)	Eddy Merckx (BEL) (14/19)	Eddy Merckx (BEL) (15/19)	Felice Gimondi (ITA) (3/4)
1974	Felice Gimondi (ITA) (4/4)	Cees Bal (NED)	Roger De Vlaeminck (BEL) (4/11)	Georges Pintens (BEL)	Roger De Vlaeminck (BEL) (5/11)
1975	Eddy Merckx (BEL) (16/19)	Eddy Merckx (BEL) (17/19)	Roger De Vlaeminck (BEL) (6/11)	Eddy Merckx (BEL) (18/19)	Francesco Moser (ITA) (1/6)
1976	Eddy Merckx (BEL) (19/19)	Walter Planckaert (BEL)	Marc Demeyer (BEL)	Joseph Bruyère (BEL) (1/2)	Roger De Vlaeminck (BEL) (7/11)
1977	Jan Raas (NED) (1/4)	Roger De Vlaeminck (BEL) (8/11)	Roger De Vlaeminck (BEL) (9/11)	Bernard Hinault (FRA) (1/5)	Gianbattista Baronchelli (ITA) (1/2)
1978	Roger De Vlaeminck (BEL) (10/11)	Walter Godefroot (BEL) (4/4)	Francesco Moser (ITA) (2/6)	Joseph Bruyère (BEL) (2/2)	Francesco Moser (ITA) (3/6)
1979	Roger De Vlaeminck (BEL) (11/11)	Jan Raas (NED) (2/4)	Francesco Moser (ITA) (4/6)	Dietrich Thurau (FRG)	Bernard Hinault (FRA) (2/5)
1980	Pierino Gavazzi (ITA)	Michel Pollentier (BEL)	Francesco Moser (ITA) (5/6)	Bernard Hinault (FRA) (3/5)	Fons De Wolf (BEL) (1/2)
1981	Fons De Wolf (BEL) (2/2)	Hennie Kuiper (NED) (1/4)	Bernard Hinault (FRA) (4/5)	Josef Fuchs (SUI)	Hennie Kuiper (NED) (2/4)
1982	Marc Gomez (FRA)	René Martens (BEL)	Jan Raas (NED) (3/4)	Silvano Contini (ITA)	Giuseppe Saronni (ITA) (1/2)
1983	Giuseppe Saronni (ITA) (2/2)	Jan Raas (NED) (4/4)	Hennie Kuiper (NED) (3/4)	Steven Rooks (NED)	Sean Kelly (IRL) (1/9)
1984	Francesco Moser (ITA) (6/6)	Johan Lammerts (NED)	Sean Kelly (IRL) (2/9)	Sean Kelly (IRL) (3/9)	Bernard Hinault (FRA) (5/5)
1985	Hennie Kuiper (NED) (4/4)	Eric Vanderaerden (BEL) (1/2)	Marc Madiot (FRA) (1/2)	Moreno Argentin (ITA) (1/6)	Sean Kelly (IRL) (4/9)
1986	Sean Kelly (IRL) (5/9)	Adri van der Poel (NED) (1/2)	Sean Kelly (IRL) (6/9)	Moreno Argentin (ITA) (2/6)	Gianbattista Baronchelli (ITA) (2/2)
1987	Erich Mächler (SUI)	Claude Criquielion (BEL)	Eric Vanderaerden (BEL) (2/2)	Moreno Argentin (ITA) (3/6)	Moreno Argentin (ITA) (4/6)
1988	Laurent Fignon (FRA) (1/2)	Eddy Planckaert (BEL) (1/2)	Dirk Demol (BEL)	Adri van der Poel (NED) (2/2)	Charly Mottet (FRA)
1989	Laurent Fignon (FRA) (2/2)	Edwig van Hooydonck (BEL) (1/2)	Jean-Marie Wampers (BEL)	Sean Kelly (IRL) (7/9)	Tony Rominger (SUI) (1/2)
1990	Gianni Bugno (ITA) (1/2)	Moreno Argentin (ITA) (5/6)	Eddy Planckaert (BEL) (2/2)	Eric van Lancker (BEL)	Gilles Delion (FRA)
1991	Claudio Chiappucci (ITA)	Edwig van Hooydonck (BEL) (2/2)	Marc Madiot (FRA) (2/2)	Moreno Argentin (ITA) (6/6)	Sean Kelly (IRL) (8/9)
1992	Sean Kelly (IRL) (9/9)	Jacky Durand (FRA)	Gilbert Duclos-Lassalle (FRA) (1/2)	Dirk de Wolf (BEL)	Tony Rominger (SUI) (2/2)
1993	Maurizio Fondriest (ITA)	Johan Museeuw (BEL) (1/6)	Gilbert Duclos-Lassalle (FRA) (2/2)	Rolf Sørensen (DEN) (1/2)	Pascal Richard (SUI) (1/2)
1994	Giorgio Furlan (ITA)	Gianni Bugno (ITA) (2/2)	Andrei Tchmil (MDA) (1/3)	Evgeni Berzin (RUS)	Vladislav Bobrik (RUS)
1995	Laurent Jalabert (FRA) (1/2)	Johan Museeuw (BEL) (2/6)	Franco Ballerini (ITA) (1/2)	Mauro Gianetti (SUI)	Gianni Faresin (ITA)
1996	Gabriele Colombo (ITA)	Michele Bartoli (ITA) (1/5)	Johan Museeuw (BEL) (3/6)	Pascal Richard (SUI) (2/2)	Andrea Tafi (ITA) (1/3)
1997	Erik Zabel (GER) (1/4)	Rolf Sørensen (DEN) (2/2)	Frédéric Guesdon (FRA)	Michele Bartoli (ITA) (2/5)	Laurent Jalabert (FRA) (2/2)
1998	Erik Zabel (GER) (2/4)	Johan Museeuw (BEL) (4/6)	Franco Ballerini (ITA) (2/2)	Michele Bartoli (ITA) (3/5)	Oscar Camenzind (SUI) (1/2)
1999	Andrei Tchmil (BEL) (2/3)	Peter Van Petegem (BEL) (1/3)	Andrea Tafi (ITA) (2/3)	Frank Vandenbroucke (BEL)	Mirko Celestino (ITA)
2000	Erik Zabel (GER) (3/4)	Andrei Tchmil (BEL) (3/3)	Johan Museeuw (BEL) (5/6)	Paolo Bettini (ITA) (1/5)	Raimondas Rumšas (LTU)
2001	Erik Zabel (GER) (4/4)	Gianluca Bortolami (ITA)	Servais Knaven (NED)	Oscar Camenzind (SUI) (2/2)	Danilo Di Luca (ITA) (1/2)
2002	Mario Cipollini (ITA)	Andrea Tafi (ITA) (3/3)	Johan Museeuw (BEL) (6/6)	Paolo Bettini (ITA) (2/5)	Michele Bartoli (ITA) (4/5)
2003	Paolo Bettini (ITA) (3/5)	Peter Van Petegem (BEL) (2/3)	Peter Van Petegem (BEL) (3/3)	Tyler Hamilton (USA)	Michele Bartoli (ITA) (5/5)
2004	Óscar Freire (ESP) (1/3)	Steffen Wesemann (GER)	Magnus Bäckstedt (SWE)	Davide Rebellin (ITA)	Damiano Cunego (ITA) (1/3)
2005	Alessandro Petacchi (ITA)	Tom Boonen (BEL) (1/7)	Tom Boonen (BEL) (2/7)	Alexander Vinokourov (KAZ) (1/2)	Paolo Bettini (ITA) (4/5)
2006	Filippo Pozzato (ITA)	Tom Boonen (BEL) (3/7)	Fabian Cancellara (SUI) (1/7)	Alejandro Valverde (ESP) (1/4)	Paolo Bettini (ITA) (5/5)
2007	Óscar Freire (ESP) (2/3)	Alessandro Ballan (ITA)	Stuart O'Grady (AUS)	Danilo Di Luca (ITA) (2/2)	Damiano Cunego (ITA) (2/3)
2008	Fabian Cancellara (SUI) (2/7)	Stijn Devolder (BEL) (1/2)	Tom Boonen (BEL) (4/7)	Alejandro Valverde (ESP) (2/4)	Damiano Cunego (ITA) (3/3)
2009	Mark Cavendish (GBR)	Stijn Devolder (BEL) (2/2)	Tom Boonen (BEL) (5/7)	Andy Schleck (LUX)	Philippe Gilbert (BEL) (1/5)
2010	Óscar Freire (ESP) (3/3)	Fabian Cancellara (SUI) (3/7)	Fabian Cancellara (SUI) (4/7)	Alexander Vinokourov (KAZ) (2/2)	Philippe Gilbert (BEL) (2/5)
2011	Matthew Goss (AUS)	Nick Nuyens (BEL)	Johan Vansummeren (BEL)	Philippe Gilbert (BEL) (3/5)	Oliver Zaugg (SUI)
2012	Simon Gerrans (AUS) (1/2)	Tom Boonen (BEL) (6/7)	Tom Boonen (BEL) (7/7)	Maxim Iglinsky (KAZ)	Joaquim Rodríguez (ESP) (1/2)
2013	Gerald Ciolek (GER)	Fabian Cancellara (SUI) (5/7)	Fabian Cancellara (SUI) (6/7)	Dan Martin (IRL) (1/2)	Joaquim Rodríguez (ESP) (2/2)
2014	Alexander Kristoff (NOR) (1/2)	Fabian Cancellara (SUI) (7/7)	Niki Terpstra (NED) (1/2)	Simon Gerrans (AUS) (2/2)	Dan Martin (IRL) (2/2)
2015	John Degenkolb (GER) (1/2)	Alexander Kristoff (NOR) (2/2)	John Degenkolb (GER) (2/2)	Alejandro Valverde (ESP) (3/4)	Vincenzo Nibali (ITA) (1/3)
2016	Arnaud Démare (FRA)	Peter Sagan (SVK) (1/2)	Mathew Hayman (AUS)	Wout Poels (NED)	Esteban Chaves (COL)
2017	Michał Kwiatkowski (POL)	Philippe Gilbert (BEL) (4/5)	Greg Van Avermaet (BEL)	Alejandro Valverde (ESP) (4/4)	Vincenzo Nibali (ITA) (2/3)
2018	Vincenzo Nibali (ITA) (3/3)	Niki Terpstra (NED) (2/2)	Peter Sagan (SVK) (2/2)	Bob Jungels (LUX)	Thibaut Pinot (FRA)
2019	Julian Alaphilippe (FRA)	Alberto Bettiol (ITA)	Philippe Gilbert (BEL) (5/5)	Jakob Fuglsang (DEN) (1/2)	Bauke Mollema (NED)
2020	Wout van Aert (BEL) (1/2)	Mathieu van der Poel (NED) (1/8)	Not contested (Note: The 2020 Paris–Roubaix was initially moved to October and subsequently cancelled in its entirety due to the global COVID-19 pandemic.)	Primož Roglič (SLO)	Jakob Fuglsang (DEN) (2/2)
2021	Jasper Stuyven (BEL)	Kasper Asgreen (DEN)	Sonny Colbrelli (ITA)	Tadej Pogačar (SLO) (1/13)	Tadej Pogačar (SLO) (2/13)
2022	Matej Mohorič (SLO)	Mathieu van der Poel (NED) (2/8)	Dylan van Baarle (NED)	Remco Evenepoel (BEL) (1/2)	Tadej Pogačar (SLO) (3/13)
2023	Mathieu van der Poel (NED) (3/8)	Tadej Pogačar (SLO) (4/13)	Mathieu van der Poel (NED) (4/8)	Remco Evenepoel (BEL) (2/2)	Tadej Pogačar (SLO) (5/13)
2024	Jasper Philipsen (BEL)	Mathieu van der Poel (NED) (5/8)	Mathieu van der Poel (NED) (6/8)	Tadej Pogačar (SLO) (6/13)	Tadej Pogačar (SLO) (7/13)
2025	Mathieu van der Poel (NED) (7/8)	Tadej Pogačar (SLO) (8/13)	Mathieu van der Poel (NED) (8/8)	Tadej Pogačar (SLO) (9/13)	Tadej Pogačar (SLO) (10/13)
2026	Tadej Pogačar (SLO) (11/13)	Tadej Pogačar (SLO) (12/13)	Wout van Aert (BEL) (2/2)	Tadej Pogačar (SLO) (13/13)	Paul Seixas (FRA)

== Statistics ==
=== Most monuments wins ===
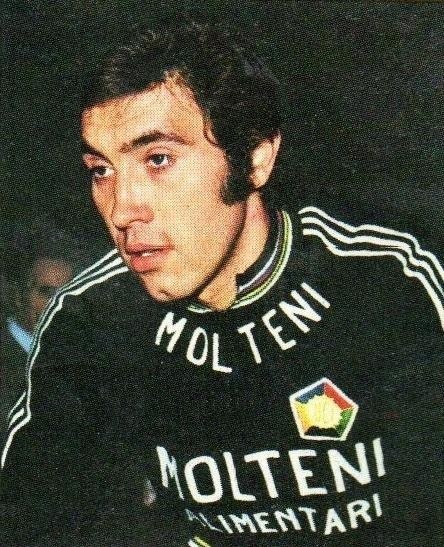
Eddy Merckx in 1974

Only three riders have won all five monument races during their careers: Rik Van Looy, Eddy Merckx, and Roger De Vlaeminck, all three Belgians, and only Eddy Merckx won each of them more than once.

Seven riders won four different monuments. With multiple victories in all the other monuments, Sean Kelly almost joined the top group, finishing second in the Tour of Flanders on three occasions (1984, 1986 and 1987). Kelly is the only other rider, after Merckx, to win four different monuments on multiple occasions. Dutch rider Hennie Kuiper won each monument except Liège–Bastogne–Liège, in which he finished second in 1980. Frenchman Louison Bobet also won all but Liège–Bastogne–Liège. Belgian rider Fred De Bruyne came close as well, finishing second in the Giro di Lombardia in 1955 and winning the other four races during his career. Germain Derycke also won four, all except the Giro di Lombardia. Belgian Phillipe Gilbert won all except Milan-San Remo, in which he finished third on two occasions. Tadej Pogačar is the most recent rider to win four different monuments, all except Paris-Roubaix, in which he finished second in 2025 and 2026.

Tadej Pogačar is the first rider to achieve a podium finish in all 5 monuments in the same season in 2025: M-R(3rd), ToF(1st), P-R(2nd), L-B-L(1st), GdL(1st). This streak also means he has the most consecutive monument podiums with 11 in a row, when 2024: L-B-L(1st), GdL(1st), and 2026: M-R(1st), ToF(1st), P-R(2nd), L-B-L(1st) are included. He is also the first one winning 4 monuments in a row, from L-B-L in 2025 to ToF in 2026.

Tadej Pogačar is also the first rider ever to win the same monument 5 years in a row with his winning streak at Giro di Lombardia going from 2021 to 2025, eclipsing the previous record held by Fausto Coppi since 1949 in the same race. Eddy Merckx holds the record of most victories in a single Monument, winning Milan-San Remo seven times.

2025 was also the first time ever 2 riders won all 5 monuments in a single season between them with Tadej Pogačar winning Liège–Bastogne–Liège, Tour of Flanders and Giro di Lombardia, whilst Mathieu van der Poel won Milan-San-Remo and Paris-Roubaix. They are the only riders to both win two monuments in a season, doing so three season in a row, in 2023, 2024 and 2025. Together they won eleven monuments in a row, from the Tour of Flanders 2024 Paris-Roubaix 2026 when Wout Van Aert won Paris-Roubaix in 2026(Pogačar won 7, van der Poel won 4).

Legend
^{†}	Rider won all five monuments
^{‡}	Rider won four different monuments
**X** (bold)	Record number of wins for a single monument
**Rider** (bold)	Rider is active

Rank	Cyclist	Nationality	First win	Latest win	M–S	ToF	P–R	L–B–L	GdL	Total
1	Eddy Merckx^{†}	Belgium	1966	1976	**7**	2	3	**5**	2	19
2	**Tadej Pogačar**^{‡}	Slovenia	2021	2026	1	**3**	—	4	**5**	13
3	Roger De Vlaeminck^{†}	Belgium	1970	1979	3	1	**4**	1	2	11
4	Costante Girardengo	Italy	1918	1928	6	—	—	—	3	9
4	Fausto Coppi	Italy	1946	1954	3	—	1	—	**5**	9
4	Sean Kelly^{‡}	Ireland	1983	1992	2	—	2	2	3	9
7	Rik Van Looy^{†}	Belgium	1958	1965	1	2	3	1	1	8
7	**Mathieu van der Poel**	Netherlands	2020	2025	2	**3**	3	—	—	8
9	Gino Bartali	Italy	1936	1950	4	—	—	—	3	7
9	Tom Boonen	Belgium	2005	2012	—	**3**	**4**	—	—	7
9	Fabian Cancellara	Switzerland	2006	2014	1	**3**	3	—	—	7
12	Henri Pélissier	France	1911	1921	1	—	2	—	3	6
12	Alfredo Binda	Italy	1925	1931	2	—	—	—	4	6
12	Fred De Bruyne^{‡}	Belgium	1956	1959	1	1	1	3	—	6
12	Francesco Moser	Italy	1975	1984	1	—	3	—	2	6
12	Moreno Argentin	Italy	1985	1991	—	1	—	4	1	6
12	Johan Museeuw	Belgium	1993	2002	—	**3**	3	—	—	6
18	Gaetano Belloni	Italy	1915	1928	2	—	—	—	3	5
18	Rik Van Steenbergen	Belgium	1944	1954	1	2	2	—	—	5
18	Bernard Hinault	France	1977	1984	—	—	1	2	2	5
18	Michele Bartoli	Italy	1996	2003	—	1	—	2	2	5
18	Paolo Bettini	Italy	2000	2006	1	—	—	2	2	5
18	Philippe Gilbert^{‡}	Belgium	2009	2019	—	1	1	1	2	5
24	Gaston Rebry	Belgium	1931	1935	—	1	3	—	—	4
24	Alfons Schepers	Belgium	1929	1935	—	1	—	3	—	4
24	Louison Bobet^{‡}	France	1951	1956	1	1	1	—	1	4
24	Germain Derycke^{‡}	Belgium	1953	1958	1	1	1	1	—	4
24	Felice Gimondi	Italy	1966	1974	1	—	1	—	2	4
24	Walter Godefroot	Belgium	1967	1978	—	2	1	1	—	4
24	Hennie Kuiper^{‡}	Netherlands	1981	1985	1	1	1	—	1	4
24	Jan Raas	Netherlands	1977	1983	1	2	1	—	—	4
24	Erik Zabel	Germany	1997	2001	4	—	—	—	—	4
24	Alejandro Valverde	Spain	2006	2017	—	—	—	4	—	4

=== Winners by nationality ===
Rank	Nationality	M–S	ToF	P–R	L–B–L	GdL	Total
1	Belgium	23	**69**	**58**	**61**	12	**222**
2	Italy	**51**	11	14	12	**69**	157
3	France	14	3	28	5	13	63
4	Netherlands	5	13	10	4	4	35
5	Switzerland	2	4	4	6	5	21
6	Slovenia	2	3	0	5	5	15
7	Germany	7	2	2	2	0	13
8	Ireland	2	0	2	3	4	11
8	Spain	5	0	0	4	2	11
10	Australia	2	0	2	1	0	5
10	Denmark	0	2	0	2	1	5
10	Luxembourg	0	0	1	3	1	5
13	United Kingdom	2	1	0	0	1	4
14	Kazakhstan	0	0	0	3	0	3
15	Norway	1	1	0	0	0	2
15	Russia	0	0	0	1	1	2
15	Slovakia	0	1	1	0	0	2
18	Colombia	0	0	0	0	1	1
18	Lithuania	0	0	0	0	1	1
18	Moldova	0	0	1	0	0	1
18	Poland	1	0	0	0	0	1
18	Sweden	0	0	1	0	0	1
18	United States	0	0	0	1	0	1

=== Most wins per monument ===
Monument	Wins	Rider(s)
(Italy) **Milan-San Remo**	7	Eddy Merckx (BEL)
(Belgium) **Tour of Flanders**	3	Achiel Buysse (BEL); Fiorenzo Magni (ITA); Eric Leman (BEL); Johan Museeuw (BEL); Tom Boonen (BEL); Fabian Cancellara (SUI); Mathieu van der Poel (NED); Tadej Pogačar (SLO)
(France) **Paris-Roubaix**	4	Roger De Vlaeminck (BEL); Tom Boonen (BEL)
(Belgium) **Liège-Bastogne-Liège**	5	Eddy Merckx (BEL)
(Italy) **Giro di Lombardia**	5	Fausto Coppi (ITA); Tadej Pogačar (SLO)

=== Winners of three monuments in a single year ===
No rider has ever won more than three monuments in a single year. Eddy Merckx and Tadej Pogačar have won three monuments in a single year:

Milan–San Remo, Tour of Flanders and Liège–Bastogne–Liège
1969	(Belgium) Eddy Merckx
1975	(Belgium) Eddy Merckx
2026	(Slovenia) Tadej Pogačar

Milan–San Remo, Liège–Bastogne–Liège and Giro di Lombardia
1971	(Belgium) Eddy Merckx
1972	(Belgium) Eddy Merckx

Tour of Flanders, Liège–Bastogne–Liège and Giro di Lombardia
2025	(Slovenia) Tadej Pogačar

=== Winners of two monuments in a single year ===
26 different riders (including Merckx and Pogačar) have managed to win two Monuments in the same year. The most common "double" consists of the two cobbled classics (Tour of Flanders and Paris–Roubaix), which have been won by the same rider in the same year on 13 occasions. The Italian "double" (Milan–San Remo and Giro di Lombardia) has been achieved 11 times. All 10 possible doubles have been achieved by multiple riders. Below the list of all doubles with years in bold indicating that they were part of a triple of monument wins (see the section above).

Milan–San Remo and Tour of Flanders
**1969**	(Belgium) Eddy Merckx
**1975**	(Belgium) Eddy Merckx
**2026**	(Slovenia) Tadej Pogačar

Milan–San Remo and Paris–Roubaix
1908	(Belgium) Cyrille van Hauwaert
1986	(Republic of Ireland) Sean Kelly
2015	(Germany) John Degenkolb
2023	(Netherlands) Mathieu van der Poel
2025	(Netherlands) Mathieu van der Poel

Milan–San Remo and Liège–Bastogne–Liège
1956	(Belgium) Fred De Bruyne
**1969**	(Belgium) Eddy Merckx
**1971**	(Belgium) Eddy Merckx
**1972**	(Belgium) Eddy Merckx
**1975**	(Belgium) Eddy Merckx
**2026**	(Slovenia) Tadej Pogačar

Milan–San Remo and Giro di Lombardia
1921	(Italy) Costante Girardengo
1930	(Italy) Michele Mara
1931	(Italy) Alfredo Binda
1939	(Italy) Gino Bartali
1940	(Italy) Gino Bartali
1946	(Italy) Fausto Coppi
1948	(Italy) Fausto Coppi
1949	(Italy) Fausto Coppi
1951	(France) Louison Bobet
**1971**	(Belgium) Eddy Merckx
**1972**	(Belgium) Eddy Merckx

Tour of Flanders and Paris–Roubaix
1923	(Switzerland) Heiri Suter
1932	(Belgium) Romain Gijssels
1934	(Belgium) Gaston Rebry
1954	(Belgium) Raymond Impanis
1957	(Belgium) Fred De Bruyne
1962	(Belgium) Rik Van Looy
1977	(Belgium) Roger De Vlaeminck
2003	(Belgium) Peter Van Petegem
2005	(Belgium) Tom Boonen
2010	(Switzerland) Fabian Cancellara
2012	(Belgium) Tom Boonen
2013	(Switzerland) Fabian Cancellara
2024	(Netherlands) Mathieu van der Poel

Tour of Flanders and Liège–Bastogne–Liège
**1969**	(Belgium) Eddy Merckx
**1975**	(Belgium) Eddy Merckx
**2025**	(Slovenia) Tadej Pogačar
**2026**	(Slovenia) Tadej Pogačar

Tour of Flanders and Giro di Lombardia
1959	(Belgium) Rik Van Looy
1981	(Netherlands) Hennie Kuiper
2023	(Slovenia) Tadej Pogačar
**2025**	(Slovenia) Tadej Pogačar

Paris–Roubaix and Liège–Bastogne–Liège
1961	(Belgium) Rik Van Looy
1973	(Belgium) Eddy Merckx
1984	(Republic of Ireland) Sean Kelly

Paris–Roubaix and Giro di Lombardia
1966	(Italy) Felice Gimondi
1974	(Belgium) Roger De Vlaeminck
1978	(Italy) Francesco Moser

Liège–Bastogne–Liège and Giro di Lombardia
**1971**	(Belgium) Eddy Merckx
**1972**	(Belgium) Eddy Merckx
1987	(Italy) Moreno Argentin
2021	(Slovenia) Tadej Pogačar
2024	(Slovenia) Tadej Pogačar
**2025**	(Slovenia) Tadej Pogačar

=== Most consecutive monuments ===
Tadej Pogačar won four consecutive monuments over two seasons – the 2025 Liège–Bastogne–Liège, the 2025 Il Lombardia, the 2026 Milan-San Remo and the 2026 Tour of Flanders, the only rider to have done so. His streak ended with the 2026 Paris–Roubaix, where he finished second, behind Wout van Aert, before once more winning 2026 Liège–Bastogne–Liège two weeks later.

== Women's events ==
As of 2026, four of the five monuments hold women's races as part of the UCI Women's World Tour. At least two monuments have had women's races in each calendar year since 2017, as well as in 2004 and 2005. As of 2026, Giro di Lombardia is the only monument without an equivalent race for women. RCS Sport, the organizers of the men's Giro di Lombardia, are reportedly planning to launch a women's edition in 2028.

- (Italy) Milan–San Remo Women – a women's version of Milan–San Remo, named Primavera Rosa, was first held in 1999, but cancelled after 2005. Since 2025, the race takes place as Milano–San Remo Donne, on the same day and over a shorter course as the men's race.
- (Belgium) Tour of Flanders – a women's edition of the Tour of Flanders has been held continuously since 2004. The first of the cobbled classics takes place on the same day as the men's event over a shorter route.
- (France) Paris–Roubaix Femmes – First held in October 2021, after the 2020 edition was cancelled due to the COVID-19 pandemic. The race takes place on the same day as the men's event over a shorter route.
- (Belgium) Liège–Bastogne–Liège Femmes – First held in 2017. The last of the Ardennes classics is held on the same day and over a shorter course as the men's race.

In 2021, British rider Lizzie Deignan became the first women's rider to win more than two of these events, having won 2016 Tour of Flanders for Women, 2020 Liège–Bastogne–Liège Femmes and 2021 Paris–Roubaix Femmes. Three riders have won two of them in one year – Zulfiya Zabirova in 2004, Anna van der Breggen in 2018 and Demi Vollering in 2026.

Until 2026, the women's editions did not have a higher points status above other one-day races. From 2026, the UCI awarded more ranking points to the four races compared to other one-day races in the UCI Women's World Tour – thereby officially designating them as monuments. Media have discussed other races that may be worthy of the "monument" title, including Trofeo Alfredo Binda-Comune di Cittiglio (the oldest one-day race on the women's calendar) and Strade Bianche Donne.

=== Winners ===
Year	Milan–San Remo Women	Tour of Flanders	Paris–Roubaix Femmes	Liège–Bastogne–Liège Femmes
1999	Sara Felloni (ITA)	Not held	Not held	Not held
2000	Diana Žiliūtė (LTU)	Not held	Not held	Not held
2001	Susanne Ljungskog (SWE)	Not held	Not held	Not held
2002	Mirjam Melchers-van Poppel (NED) (1/3)	Not held	Not held	Not held
2003	Zoulfia Zabirova (RUS) (1/3)	Not held	Not held	Not held
2004	Zoulfia Zabirova (RUS) (2/3)	Zoulfia Zabirova (RUS) (3/3)	Not held	Not held
2005	Trixi Worrack (GER)	Mirjam Melchers-van Poppel (NED) (2/3)	Not held	Not held
2006	Not held	Mirjam Melchers-van Poppel (NED) (3/3)	Not held	Not held
2007	Not held	Nicole Cooke (GBR)	Not held	Not held
2008	Not held	Judith Arndt (GER) (1/2)	Not held	Not held
2009	Not held	Ina-Yoko Teutenberg (GER)	Not held	Not held
2010	Not held	Grace Verbeke (BEL)	Not held	Not held
2011	Not held	Annemiek van Vleuten (NED) (1/4)	Not held	Not held
2012	Not held	Judith Arndt (GER) (2/2)	Not held	Not held
2013	Not held	Marianne Vos (NED)	Not held	Not held
2014	Not held	Ellen van Dijk (NED)	Not held	Not held
2015	Not held	Elisa Longo Borghini (ITA) (1/3)	Not held	Not held
2016	Not held	Lizzie Armitstead (GBR) (1/3)	Not held	Not held
2017	Not held	Coryn Rivera (USA)	Not held	Anna van der Breggen (NED) (1/3)
2018	Not held	Anna van der Breggen (NED) (2/3)	Not held	Anna van der Breggen (NED) (3/3)
2019	Not held	Marta Bastianelli (ITA)	Not held	Annemiek van Vleuten (NED) (2/4)
2020	Not held	Chantal van den Broek-Blaak (NED)	Race cancelled (Note: The 2020 Paris–Roubaix Femmes was initially moved to October and subsequently cancelled in its entirety due to the global COVID-19 pandemic.)	Lizzie Deignan (GBR) (2/3)
2021	Not held	Annemiek van Vleuten (NED) (3/4)	Lizzie Deignan (GBR) (3/3)	Demi Vollering (NED) (1/4)
2022	Not held	Lotte Kopecky (BEL) (1/5)	Elisa Longo Borghini (ITA) (2/3)	Annemiek van Vleuten (NED) (4/4)
2023	Not held	Lotte Kopecky (BEL) (2/5)	Alison Jackson (CAN)	Demi Vollering (NED) (2/4)
2024	Not held	Elisa Longo Borghini (ITA) (3/3)	Lotte Kopecky (BEL) (3/5)	Grace Brown (AUS)
2025	Lorena Wiebes (NED)	Lotte Kopecky (BEL) (4/5)	Pauline Ferrand-Prévot (FRA)	Kimberley Le Court (MUS)
2026	Lotte Kopecky (BEL) (5/5)	Demi Vollering (NED) (3/4)	Franziska Koch (GER)	Demi Vollering (NED) (4/4)
Year	Milan–San Remo Women	Tour of Flanders	Paris–Roubaix Femmes	Liège–Bastogne–Liège Femmes

=== Most monuments wins ===
Rank	Cyclist	Nationality	First win	Latest win	M–S	ToF	P–R	L–B–L	Total
1	Lotte Kopecky	Belgium	2022	2026	1	3	1	0	5
2	Annemiek van Vleuten	Netherlands	2011	2022	0	2	0	2	4
2	Demi Vollering	Netherlands	2021	2026	0	1	0	3	4
3	Zoulfia Zabirova	Russia	2003	2004	2	1	0	0	3
3	Mirjam Melchers-van Poppel	Netherlands	2002	2006	1	2	0	0	3
3	Anna van der Breggen	Netherlands	2017	2018	0	1	0	2	3
3	Lizzie Deignan	United Kingdom	2016	2021	0	1	1	1	3
3	Elisa Longo Borghini	Italy	2015	2024	0	2	1	0	3
9	Judith Arndt	Germany	2008	2012	0	2	0	0	2

=== Winners of two monuments in a single year ===
3 different riders have managed to win two Monuments in the same year.

Milan–San Remo and Tour of Flanders
2004	(Russia) Zoulfia Zabirova

Tour of Flanders and Liège–Bastogne–Liège
2017	(Netherlands) Anna van der Breggen
2026	(Netherlands) Demi Vollering

=== Winners by nationality ===
Rank	Nationality	M–S	ToF	P–R	L–B–L	Total
1	Netherlands	2	9	0	7	18
2	Belgium	1	4	1	0	6
3	Italy	1	3	1	0	5
3	Germany	1	3	1	0	5
5	United Kingdom	0	2	1	1	4
6	Russia	2	1	0	0	3
7	Australia	0	0	0	1	1
7	Canada	0	0	1	0	1
7	France	0	0	1	0	1
7	Lithuania	1	0	0	0	1
7	Mauritius	0	0	0	1	1
7	Sweden	1	0	0	0	1
7	United States	0	1	0	0	1
