= 1932 Liège–Bastogne–Liège =

Race details
- Dates: 5 May 1932
- Stages: 1
- Distance: 214 km (133 mi)
- Winning time: 6h 32' 02"

Results
	Winner	Marcel Houyoux (BEL)
	Second	Leopold Roosemont (BEL)
	Third	Gérard Lambrechts (BEL)

The 1932 Liège–Bastogne–Liège was the 22nd edition of the Liège–Bastogne–Liège cycle race and was held on 5 May 1932. The race started and finished in Liège. The race was won by Marcel Houyoux.

== General classification ==
Final general classification

Rank	Rider	Time
1	Marcel Houyoux (BEL)	6h 32' 02"
2	Leopold Roosemont (BEL)	+ 0"
3	Gérard Lambrechts (BEL)	+ 0"
4	Hermann Buse (GER)	+ 0"
5	Cornelius Leemans (BEL)	+ 0"
5	Achille Viane (BEL)	+ 0"
5	Eugène Gybels (BEL)	+ 0"
5	Alphons De Beule (BEL)	+ 0"
5	Kurt Stöpel (GER)	+ 0"
5	Georges Lemaire (BEL)	+ 0"
