= 1927 Liège–Bastogne–Liège =

Race details
- Dates: 10 April 1927
- Stages: 1
- Distance: 231 km (144 mi)
- Winning time: 8h 15' 39"

Results
	Winner	Maurice Raes (BEL)
	Second	Jean Hans (BEL)
	Third	Joseph Siquet (BEL)

The 1927 Liège–Bastogne–Liège was the 17th edition of the Liège–Bastogne–Liège cycle race and was held on 10 April 1927. The race started and finished in Liège. The race was won by Maurice Raes.

== General classification ==
Final general classification

Rank	Rider	Time
1	Maurice Raes (BEL)	8h 15' 39"
2	Jean Hans (BEL)	+ 0"
3	Joseph Siquet (BEL)	+ 0"
4	Auguste Van Haelter (BEL)	+ 0"
5	Alexis Macar (BEL)	+ 0"
6	Léon Briskot (BEL)	+ 0"
6	François Gardier (BEL)	+ 0"
6	Jean Wauters (BEL)	+ 0"
6	Emile Joly (BEL)	+ 0"
6	Ernest Mottard (BEL)	+ 0"
