= 1943 Liège–Bastogne–Liège =

Race details
- Dates: 27 June 1943
- Stages: 1
- Distance: 211 km (131 mi)
- Winning time: 5h 52' 00"

Results
	Winner	Richard Depoorter (BEL)
	Second	Joseph Didden (BEL)
	Third	Stan Ockers (BEL)

The 1943 Liège–Bastogne–Liège was the 30th edition of the Liège–Bastogne–Liège cycle race and was held on 27 June 1943. The race started and finished in Liège. The race was won by Richard Depoorter.

== General classification ==
Final general classification

Rank	Rider	Time
1	Richard Depoorter (BEL)	5h 52' 00"
2	Joseph Didden (BEL)	+ 7"
3	Stan Ockers (BEL)	+ 40"
4	Briek Schotte (BEL)	+ 40"
5	Albert Dubuisson (BEL)	+ 40"
6	Joseph Somers (BEL)	+ 40"
7	Hubert Deltour (BEL)	+ 40"
8	Prosper Depredomme (BEL)	+ 40"
9	André Declerck (BEL)	+ 1' 00"
10	Edward Van Dijck (BEL)	+ 1' 00"
