= Louis Rasquinet =

Belgian cyclist (1870–1936)

Personal information
- Born: 16 September 1870 Liège, Belgium
- Died: 9 June 1936 (aged 65) Liège, Belgium

Cycling career
- Sport: Cycling
- Discipline: Road
- Role: Rider

Amateur team
- 1891-1897: Individual

Major wins
- Wandre Championships (1892); Ans–Oreye–Ans (1895)

Louis Rasquinet, also indicated as Jean Rasquinet, (Note: CyclingRanking.com list the rider under the name Jean Rasquinet and gives 1873 as year of birth.) (16 September 1870 – 9 June 1936) was a Belgian road bicycle racer. He competed in road races during the 1890s, during the early years of competitive road cycling in Belgium.

In 1891, he won the silver medal at the Belgian National Road Race Championships and he had two times a podium finish at the first three editions of the cycling monument Liège–Bastogne–Liège in 1892 and 1894.

== Major achievements ==
1891
(silver) Belgian National Road Race Championships
6th Course Coulisse Théatrale & Sportive
1892
(gold) Wandre Championships
2nd Mons (Long-Distance Championship)
2nd Wavre–Nivelles
3rd 1892 Liège–Bastogne–Liège

1893
2nd Dinant–Namur–Givet–Dinant
2nd Verviers
3rd Liège–Spa–Liège
3rd Bruxelles–Leuven–Bruxelles
5th 1893 Liège–Bastogne–Liège
5th Huy-Namur-Huy-Amay-Huy
4th Huy Championships
4th Belgian Long-Distance Championship
6th Liège vs. Antwerp

1894
2nd 1894 Liège–Bastogne–Liège
10th Aywaille–Louveigné–Aywaille

1895
1st Ans–Oreye–Ans
