= 1999 Liège–Bastogne–Liège =

1999 UCI Road World Cup, race 4
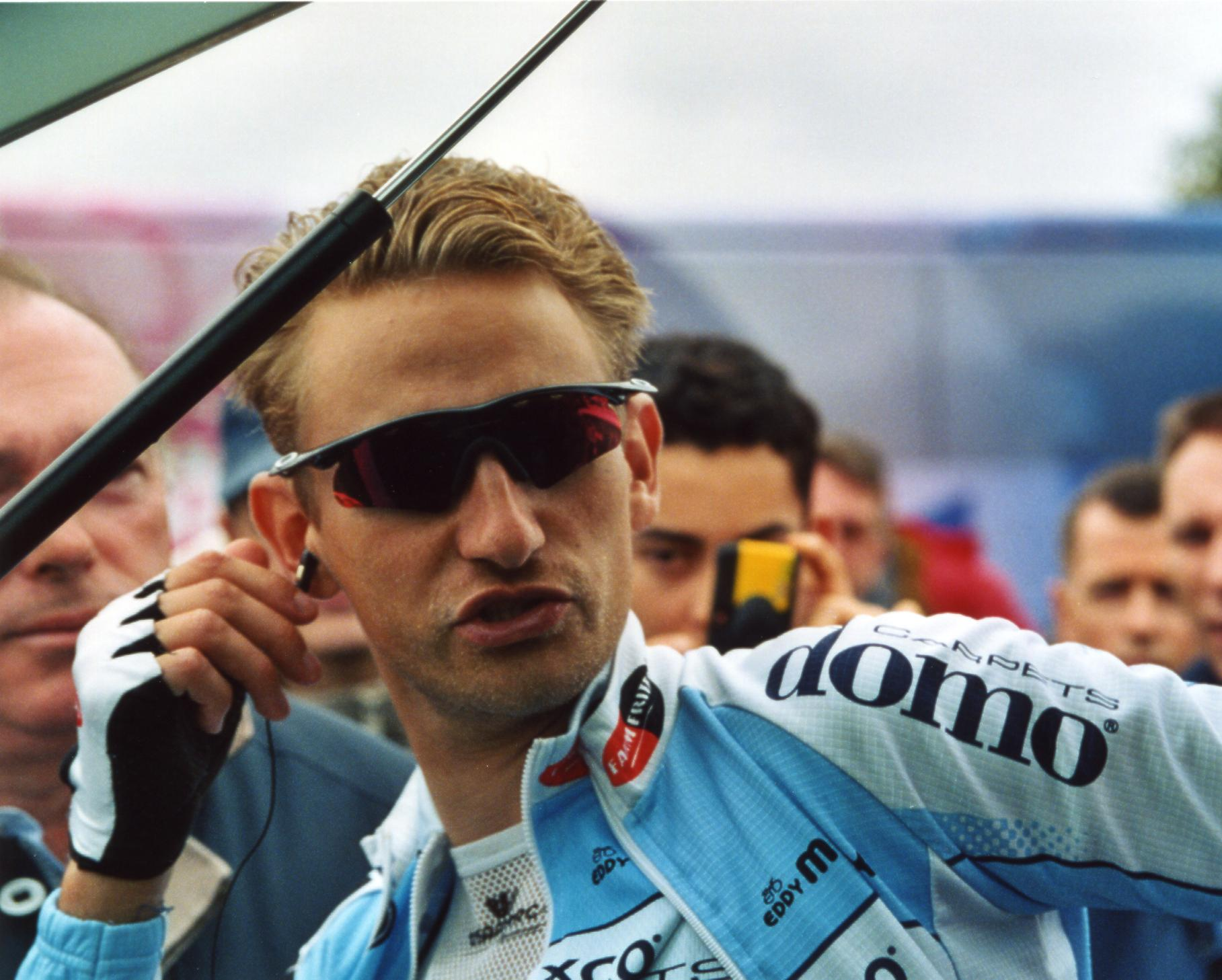
- Frank Vandenbroucke (pictured in 2002) won the 85th running of Liège–Bastogne–Liège

Race details
- Dates: 18 April 1999
- Distance: 264 km (164 mi)
- Winning time: 6h 25' 36"

Results
	Winner	Frank Vandenbroucke (BEL)	(Cofidis)
	Second	Michael Boogerd (NED)	(Rabobank)
	Third	Maarten den Bakker (NED)	(Rabobank)

The 85th running of Liège–Bastogne–Liège was held on 18 April 1999. It was the fourth leg of the 1999 UCI Road World Cup, held between Paris–Roubaix and Amstel Gold Race. Belgian Frank Vandenbroucke won the race after a solo attack on the Côte de Saint-Nicolas. Dutchmen Michael Boogerd and Maarten den Bakker completed the podium. 71 of 191 riders finished the race.

== Race Summary ==
Frenchman Laurent Jalabert broke away from the peloton at 94 km (58 mi) from the finish but was caught 50 km (31 mi) later, before the Côte de La Redoute. On La Redoute, a duel unfolded between Frank Vandenbroucke and Michele Bartoli. Bartoli, seeking a third consecutive win and winner of La Flèche Wallonne earlier in the week, attacked on the lower slopes of the climb, before being joined by Vandenbroucke. The two riders sprinted shoulder to shoulder for 10 seconds, before Vandenbroucke broke clear on the steep upper slopes and reached the top with ten seconds on Bartoli, Michael Boogerd and Maarten den Bakker.

After the Côte de La Redoute, with three climbs remaining, a lead group of 17 riders was formed with all key contenders, apart from a worn-out Jalabert. Peter Farazijn did most of the work for his leader Vandenbroucke and countered attacks from Paolo Bettini and Davide Rebellin. On the Côte de Saint-Nicolas, 7 km (4.3 mi) from the finish, Michael Boogerd attacked early on the climb, but was countered by Vandenbroucke who broke clear and powered on solo to the finish in Ans.

Vandenbroucke, who was second in the Tour of Flanders and seventh in Paris–Roubaix in the weeks before, claimed his first and only career monument win. Boogerd finished second at 30 seconds. Michele Bartoli was distanced by Maarten den Bakker in the final kilometre and finished a disappointing fourth.

== Result ==
Result (top 10)
Rank	Rider	Team	Time
1	Frank Vandenbroucke (BEL)	Cofidis	6h 25' 36"
2	Michael Boogerd (NED)	Rabobank	+ 30"
3	Maarten den Bakker (NED)	Rabobank	+ 41"
4	Michele Bartoli (ITA)	Mapei–Quick-Step	+ 44"
5	Paolo Bettini (ITA)	Mapei–Quick-Step	+ 54"
6	Niki Aebersold (SUI)	Rabobank	+ 55"
7	Markus Zberg (SUI)	Rabobank	+ 55"
8	Oscar Camenzind (SUI)	Lampre–Daikin	+ 56"
9	Udo Bölts (GER)	Team Telekom	+ 56"
10	Laurent Roux (FRA)	Casino–Ag2r Prévoyance	+ 56"
