= 1929 Liège–Bastogne–Liège =

Race details
- Dates: 9 May 1929
- Stages: 1
- Distance: 231 km (144 mi)
- Winning time: 8h 45' 25"

Results
	Winner	Alphonse Schepers (BEL)
	Second	Gustave Hombroeckx (BEL)
	Third	Maurice Raes (BEL)

The 1929 Liège–Bastogne–Liège was the 19th edition of the Liège–Bastogne–Liège cycle race and was held on 9 May 1929. The race started and finished in Liège. The race was won by Alphonse Schepers.

== General classification ==
Final general classification

Rank	Rider	Time
1	Alphonse Schepers (BEL)	8h 45' 25"
2	Gustave Hombroeckx (BEL)	+ 0"
3	Maurice Raes (BEL)	+ 0"
4	Constant Struyven (BEL)	+ 0"
5	Camille Degraeve (BEL)	+ 0"
6	Georges Laloup (BEL)	+ 1' 57"
7	Marcel Houyoux (BEL)	+ 1' 57"
8	Albert Herman (BEL)	+ 1' 57"
9	Prosper Delobelle (BEL)	+ 1' 57"
10	Henri Lepine (BEL)	+ 1' 57"
