= 1928 Liège–Bastogne–Liège =

Race details
- Dates: 13 May 1928
- Stages: 1
- Distance: 231 km (144 mi)
- Winning time: 7h 17' 00"

Results
	Winner	Ernest Mottard (BEL)
	Second	Maurice Raes (BEL)
	Third	Emile Van Belle (BEL)

The 1928 Liège–Bastogne–Liège was the 18th edition of the Liège–Bastogne–Liège cycle race and was held on 13 May 1928. The race started and finished in Liège. The race was won by Ernest Mottard.

== General classification ==
Final general classification

Rank	Rider	Time
1	Ernest Mottard (BEL)	7h 17' 00"
2	Maurice Raes (BEL)	+ 12' 00"
3	Emile Van Belle (BEL)	+ 12' 00"
4	Auguste Van Haelter (BEL)	+ 12' 00"
5	Jean Wauters (BEL)	+ 12' 00"
6	Albert Herman (BEL)	+ 17' 00"
7	Georges Lemaire (BEL)	+ 17' 00"
8	Pierre Van Mol (BEL)	+ 17' 00"
9	Troka Braems (BEL)	+ 17' 00"
10	Alfred Sira (BEL)	+ 17' 00"
