= 1930 Liège–Bastogne–Liège =

Race details
- Dates: 29 May 1930
- Stages: 1
- Distance: 231 km (144 mi)
- Winning time: 8h 25' 00"

Results
	Winner	Hermann Buse (GER)
	Second	Georges Laloup (BEL)
	Third	François Gardier (BEL)

The 1930 Liège–Bastogne–Liège was the 20th edition of the Liège–Bastogne–Liège cycle race and was held on 29 May 1930. The race started and finished in Liège. The race was won by Hermann Buse.

== General classification ==
Final general classification

Rank	Rider	Time
1	Hermann Buse (GER)	8h 25' 00"
2	Georges Laloup (BEL)	+ 0"
3	François Gardier (BEL)	+ 0"
4	Julien Vervaecke (BEL)	+ 0"
5	Jean Wauters (BEL)	+ 0"
6	Emile Van Belle (BEL)	+ 1' 06"
7	Louis De Lannoy (BEL)	+ 1' 14"
8	Albert Jordens (BEL)	+ 2' 46"
9	Leander Ghyssels (BEL)	+ 3' 52"
10	Georges Lemaire (BEL)	+ 4' 00"
