= 1947 Liège–Bastogne–Liège =

Race details
- Dates: 20 April 1947
- Stages: 1
- Distance: 218 km (135 mi)
- Winning time: 6h 28' 00"

Results
	Winner	Richard Depoorter (BEL)	(Garin–Wolber)
	Second	Raymond Impanis (BEL)	(Alcyon–Dunlop)
	Third	Florent Mathieu (BEL)	(Rochet–Dunlop)

The 1947 Liège–Bastogne–Liège was the 33rd edition of the Liège–Bastogne–Liège cycle race and was held on 20 April 1947. The race started and finished in Liège. The race was won by Richard Depoorter of the Garin–Wolber team.

== General classification ==
Final general classification

Rank	Rider	Team	Time
1	Richard Depoorter (BEL)	Garin–Wolber	6h 28' 00"
2	Raymond Impanis (BEL)	Alcyon–Dunlop	+ 4"
3	Florent Mathieu (BEL)	Rochet–Dunlop	+ 4"
4	Louis Thiétard (FRA)	Metropole–Dunlop	+ 4"
5	Stan Ockers (BEL)	Groene Leeuw	+ 4"
6	Giuseppe Tacca (ITA)		+ 4"
7	Marcel Rijckaert (BEL)	Mercier–Hutchinson	+ 1' 14"
8	René Oreel (BEL)	Bertin–Wolber	+ 1' 14"
9	Maurice De Wannemaeker (BEL)		+ 1' 14"
10	Désiré Stadsbaeder (BEL)	Arbos–Talbot	+ 1' 14"
