= 1949 Liège–Bastogne–Liège =

Race details
- Dates: 1 May 1949
- Stages: 1
- Distance: 256 km (159 mi)
- Winning time: 6h 57' 40"

Results
	Winner	Camille Danguillaume (FRA)
	Second	Adolph Verschueren (BEL)
	Third	Roger Gyselinck (BEL)

The 1949 Liège–Bastogne–Liège was the 35th edition of the Liège–Bastogne–Liège cycle race and was held on 1 May 1949. The race started and finished in Liège. The race was won by Camille Danguillaume.

== General classification ==
Final general classification

Rank	Rider	Time
1	Camille Danguillaume (FRA)	6h 57' 40"
2	Adolph Verschueren (BEL)	+ 0"
3	Roger Gyselinck (BEL)	+ 0"
4	Willy Kemp (LUX)	+ 0"
5	Maurice Meersman (BEL)	+ 0"
6	Pino Cerami (BEL)	+ 35"
7	Émile Masson (BEL)	+ 1' 25"
8	Jacques Geus (BEL)	+ 1' 25"
9	Achiel Buysse (BEL)	+ 1' 25"
10	Eugène Van Roosbroeck (BEL)	+ 1' 25"
