= Liège–Bastogne–Liège Femmes =

Belgian one-day women's cycling race

Race details
- Date: Late April
- Region: Wallonia, Belgium
- Discipline: Road
- Competition: UCI Women's World Tour (since 2017)
- Type: One-day race
- Organiser: ASO
- Web site: www.liege-bastogne-liege-femmes.be/en

History
- First edition: 2017
- Editions: 10 (as of 2026)
- First winner: Anna van der Breggen (NED)
- Most wins: Demi Vollering (NED) (3 wins)
- Most recent: Demi Vollering (NED)

Liège–Bastogne–Liège Femmes is an annual road bicycle racing event in the Ardennes region of Belgium, held in late April. It is part of the UCI Women's World Tour. The equivalent men's race is a cycling monument. Liège is one of four men's Monuments with an equivalent current women's race, along with Milan–San Remo Women, Paris–Roubaix Femmes and Tour of Flanders.

In 2017, Liège–Bastogne–Liège Femmes was inaugurated and added to the UCI Women's World Tour, becoming the second of the cycling monuments to introduce a women's edition after the Tour of Flanders in 2014. It is considered one of the most arduous one-day cycling events in the world because of its length and demanding course. The race generally marks the end of the entire spring classics season, as the one-day races give way to longer stage races; Liège is followed in the women's calendar by La Vuelta Femenina.

The race has been dominated by Dutch riders, with Demi Vollering winning three times, and Anna van der Breggen and Annemiek van Vleuten winning twice.

== History ==
The men's race was first held in 1892, making it the oldest of the five monuments of the European professional road cycling calendar.

The first-ever women's race took place in 2017, and was won by Olympic champion Anna van der Breggen. With the reboot of the Amstel Gold Race for Women and the creation of a women's Liège–Bastogne–Liège in 2017, the women's season has the same trio of Ardennes classics as the men's. Both races are held on Sundays mid-April, in addition to La Flèche Wallonne Femmes, which has been on the women's calendar since 1998.

Since 2026, the UCI has awarded more ranking points to Grand Tours and cycling monuments compared to other races in the UCI Women's World Tour – thereby officially designating the race as a cycling monument.

== Route ==
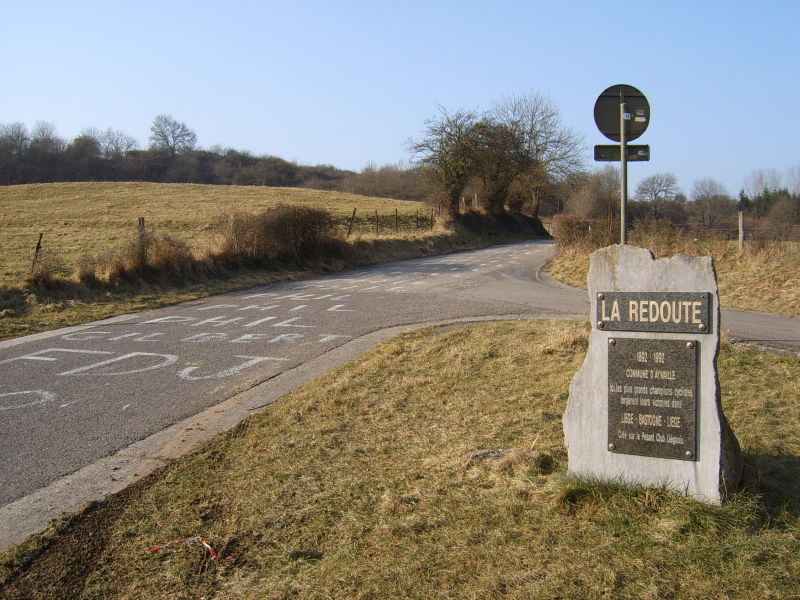
Côte de La Redoute

The race is approximately half the distance of the men's event – around 130 to 140 kilometres – starting in Bastogne, from where it heads north to finish in Liège. The route has generally used the same route as the men's race into Liège – using climbs such as Côte de La Redoute, Côte des Forges and Côte de la Roche aux Faucons. Since 2019, the race has finished in Liège, and therefore Côte de Saint-Nicolas has been omitted. The parcours, with its multiple short, hard climbs, is seen as friendlier terrain for general classification riders and climbers than the gravelled and cobbled classics of early spring.

== Winners ==
Year	Country	Rider	Team
2017	Netherlands	Anna van der Breggen	Boels–Dolmans
2018	Netherlands	Anna van der Breggen	Boels–Dolmans
2019	Netherlands	Annemiek van Vleuten	Mitchelton–Scott
2020	Great Britain	Lizzie Deignan	Trek–Segafredo
2021	Netherlands	Demi Vollering	SD Worx
2022	Netherlands	Annemiek van Vleuten	Movistar Team
2023	Netherlands	Demi Vollering	SD Worx
2024	Australia	Grace Brown	FDJ–Suez
2025	Mauritius	Kimberley Le Court	AG Insurance–Soudal
2026	Netherlands	Demi Vollering	FDJ United–Suez

=== Multiple-time winners ===
Wins	Rider	Editions
3	Demi Vollering (NED)	2021, 2023, 2026
2	Anna van der Breggen (NED)	2017, 2018
2	Annemiek van Vleuten (NED)	2019, 2022

=== Wins per country ===
Wins	Country
7	Netherlands
1	Australia; United Kingdom; Mauritius
