= 1921 Liège–Bastogne–Liège =

Race details
- Dates: 29 May 1921
- Stages: 1
- Distance: 209 km (130 mi)
- Winning time: 7h 23' 00"

Results
	Winner	Louis Mottiat (BEL)
	Second	Marcel Lacour (BEL)
	Third	Jean Rossius (BEL)

The 1921 Liège–Bastogne–Liège was the 11th edition of the Liège–Bastogne–Liège cycle race and was held on 29 May 1921. The race started and finished in Liège. The race was won by Louis Mottiat.

== General classification ==
Final general classification

Rank	Rider	Time
1	Louis Mottiat (BEL)	7h 23' 00"
2	Marcel Lacour (BEL)	+ 0"
3	Jean Rossius (BEL)	+ 0"
4	Adolphe Coppez (BEL)	+ 0"
5	Guillaume Nyssen (BEL)	+ 0"
6	Léon Scieur (BEL)	+ 0"
7	Félix Sellier (BEL)	+ 0"
7	Hector Heusghem (BEL)	+ 0"
7	Frans Beths (BEL)	+ 0"
7	Jules Matton (BEL)	+ 0"
