= 1913 Liège–Bastogne–Liège =

Race details
- Dates: 6 July 1913
- Stages: 1
- Winning time: 7h 23' 00"

Results
	Winner	Maurice Moritz (BEL)
	Second	Alphonse Fonson (BEL)
	Third	Hubert Noel (BEL)

The 1913 Liège–Bastogne–Liège was the eighth edition of the Liège–Bastogne–Liège cycle race and was held on 6 July 1913. The race started and finished in Liège. The race was won by Maurice Moritz.

== General classification ==
Final general classification

Rank	Rider	Time
1	Maurice Moritz (BEL)	7h 23' 00"
2	Alphonse Fonson (BEL)	+ 0"
3	Hubert Noel (BEL)	+ 0"
4	Omer Collignon (BEL)	+ 0"
5	René Vermandel (BEL)	+ 0"
6	Gilles Laubenthal (BEL)	+ 0"
7	Herman Braine (BEL)	+ 0"
8	Lucien Buysse (BEL)	+ 0"
9	Jules Halleux (BEL)	+ 0"
10	Camille Rossart (BEL)	+ 0"
