= 1931 Liège–Bastogne–Liège =

Race details
- Dates: 9 June 1931
- Stages: 1
- Distance: 213 km (132 mi)
- Winning time: 7h 23' 26"

Results
	Winner	Alphonse Schepers (BEL)
	Second	Marcel Houyoux (BEL)
	Third	Jean Deschepper (BEL)

The 1931 Liège–Bastogne–Liège was the 21st edition of the Liège–Bastogne–Liège cycle race and was held on 9 June 1931. The race started and finished in Liège. The race was won by Alphonse Schepers.

== General classification ==
Final general classification

Rank	Rider	Time
1	Alphonse Schepers (BEL)	7h 23' 26"
2	Marcel Houyoux (BEL)	+ 0"
3	Jean Deschepper (BEL)	+ 0"
4	Jules Goedhuys (BEL)	+ 0"
5	Erich Ussat (GER)	+ 0"
6	Jean Wauters (BEL)	+ 0"
7	Georges Lemaire (BEL)	+ 0"
8	Julien Vervaecke (BEL)	+ 4"
9	Alfons Deloor (BEL)	+ 6' 49"
10	Jan Meeuwis (BEL)	+ 8' 02"
