= 1933 Liège–Bastogne–Liège =

Race details
- Dates: 25 May 1933
- Stages: 1
- Distance: 213 km (132 mi)
- Winning time: 6h 05' 24"

Results
	Winner	François Gardier (BEL)
	Second	René Dewolf (BEL)
	Third	Albert Bolly (BEL)

The 1933 Liège–Bastogne–Liège was the 23rd edition of the Liège–Bastogne–Liège cycle race and was held on 25 May 1933. The race started and finished in Liège. The race was won by François Gardier.

== General classification ==
Final general classification

Rank	Rider	Time
1	François Gardier (BEL)	6h 05' 24"
2	René Dewolf (BEL)	+ 2' 16"
3	Albert Bolly (BEL)	+ 2' 18"
4	Edward Vissers (BEL)	+ 2' 41"
5	Georges Lemaire (BEL)	+ 2' 51"
6	Joseph Vanderhaegen (BEL)	+ 8' 08"
7	François Adam (BEL)	+ 8' 08"
8	Auguste Van Tricht (BEL)	+ 8' 21"
9	Désiré Louesse (BEL)	+ 8' 30"
10	André Decroix (BEL)	+ 8' 32"
