= 1926 Liège–Bastogne–Liège =

Race details
- Dates: 2 May 1926
- Stages: 1
- Distance: 231 km (144 mi)
- Winning time: 7h 48' 30"

Results
	Winner	Dieudonné Smets (BEL)
	Second	Joseph Siquet (BEL)
	Third	Alexis Macar (BEL)

The 1926 Liège–Bastogne–Liège was the 16th edition of the Liège–Bastogne–Liège cycle race and was held on 2 May 1926. The race started and finished in Liège. The race was won by Dieudonné Smets.

== General classification ==
Final general classification

Rank	Rider	Time
1	Dieudonné Smets (BEL)	7h 48' 30"
2	Joseph Siquet (BEL)	+ 0"
3	Alexis Macar (BEL)	+ 1' 15"
4	Joseph Wauters (BEL)	+ 4' 00"
5	Albert Bolly (BEL)	+ 4' 00"
6	Louis Muller (BEL)	+ 4' 00"
7	Antoine Loix (BEL)	+ 4' 00"
7	Michel Schouleur (BEL)	+ 4' 00"
7	Charles Meunier (BEL)	+ 4' 00"
7	Georges Laloup (BEL)	+ 4' 00"
