= 1950 Liège–Bastogne–Liège =

Race details
- Dates: 23 April 1950
- Stages: 1
- Distance: 263 km (163 mi)
- Winning time: 7h 25' 25"

Results
	Winner	Prosper Depredomme (BEL)
	Second	Jean Bogaerts (BEL)
	Third	Edward Van Dijck (BEL)

The 1950 Liège–Bastogne–Liège was the 36th edition of the Liège–Bastogne–Liège cycle race and was held on 23 April 1950. The race started and finished in Liège. The race was won by Prosper Depredomme.

== General classification ==
Final general classification

Rank	Rider	Time
1	Prosper Depredomme (BEL)	7h 25' 25"
2	Jean Bogaerts (BEL)	+ 3"
3	Edward Van Dijck (BEL)	+ 3"
4	Briek Schotte (BEL)	+ 3"
5	André Declerck (BEL)	+ 3"
6	Camille Danguillaume (FRA)	+ 3"
7	Ward Peeters (BEL)	+ 3"
8	Albert Dubuisson (BEL)	+ 3"
9	Omer Huwel (BEL)	+ 3"
10	André Rosseel (BEL)	+ 3"
