= 1935 Liège–Bastogne–Liège =

Race details
- Dates: 4 April 1935
- Stages: 1
- Distance: 240 km (150 mi)
- Winning time: 6h 37' 18"

Results
	Winner	Alphonse Schepers (BEL)
	Second	Frans Bonduel (BEL)
	Third	Louis Hardiquest (BEL)

The 1935 Liège–Bastogne–Liège was the 25th edition of the Liège–Bastogne–Liège cycle race and was held on 4 April 1935. The race started and finished in Liège. The race was won by Alphonse Schepers.

== General classification ==
Final general classification

Rank	Rider	Time
1	Alphonse Schepers (BEL)	6h 37' 18"
2	Frans Bonduel (BEL)	+ 0"
3	Louis Hardiquest (BEL)	+ 0"
4	François Gardier (BEL)	+ 7"
5	Jan-Jozef Horemans (BEL)	+ 3' 17"
6	Jules Geens (BEL)	+ 7' 02"
7	Edward Vissers (BEL)	+ 10' 01"
7	Cornelius Leemans (BEL)	+ 10' 01"
7	Alfons Deloor (BEL)	+ 10' 01"
7	Louis Bocken (BEL)	+ 10' 01"
