= 1893 Liège–Bastogne–Liège =

Race details
- Dates: 28 May 1893
- Stages: 1
- Distance: 250 km (160 mi)
- Winning time: 10h 42' 00"

Results
	Winner	Léon Houa (BEL)
	Second	Michael Borisowski (BEL)
	Third	Charles Collette (BEL)

The 1893 Liège–Bastogne–Liège was the second edition of the Liège–Bastogne–Liège cycle race and was held on 28 May 1893. The race started and finished in Liège. The race was won by Léon Houa.

== General classification ==
Final general classification

Rank	Rider	Time
1	Léon Houa (BEL)	10h 42' 00"
2	Michael Borisowski (BEL)	+ 30' 00"
3	Charles Collette (BEL)	+ 32' 00"
4	Richard Fischer (BEL)	+ 52' 00"
5	Louis Rasquinet (BEL)	+ 1h 00' 00"
6	René Nulens (BEL)	+ 1h 24' 00"
7	Henri Thanghe (BEL)	+ 1h 30' 00"
8	Degraa (BEL)	+ 1h 36' 00"
9	Lucien Loppart (BEL)	+ 2h 08' 00"
10	Van Haeme (BEL)	+ 2h 15' 00"
