= 1894 Liège–Bastogne–Liège =

Race details
- Dates: 26 August 1894
- Stages: 1
- Distance: 223 km (139 mi)
- Winning time: 8h 52' 05"

Results
	Winner	Léon Houa (BEL)
	Second	Louis Rasquinet (BEL)
	Third	René Nulens (BEL)

The 1894 Liège–Bastogne–Liège was the third edition of the Liège–Bastogne–Liège cycle race and was held on 26 August 1894. The race started and finished in Liège. The race was won by Léon Houa.

== General classification ==
Final general classification

Rank	Rider	Time
1	Léon Houa (BEL)	8h 52' 05"
2	Louis Rasquinet (BEL)	+ 7' 00"
3	René Nulens (BEL)	+ 25' 00"
4	Maurice Garin (ITA)	+ 43' 00"
5	Palau (BEL)	+ 53' 00"
6	Armand Cardol (BEL)	+ 53' 00"
7	Jos Berchmans (BEL)	+ 1h 11' 00"
8	Dethioux (BEL)	+ 1h 30' 00"
9	Mativa (BEL)	+ 1h 38' 00"
10	Ernest Winkin (BEL)	+ 1h 38' 00"
