= Liège–Bastogne–Liège =

Belgian one-day men's cycling race

Race details
- Date: Late April
- English name: Liège–Bastogne–Liège
- Local name: Liège–Bastogne–Liège (in French)
- Nickname: La Doyenne ("The Old Lady")
- Discipline: Road
- Competition: UCI World Tour
- Type: One-day Classic
- Organiser: Amaury Sport Organisation
- Race director: Christian Prudhomme
- Web site: liege-bastogne-liege.be/en

History
- First edition: 1892
- Editions: 112 (as of 2026)
- First winner: Léon Houa (BEL)
- Most wins: Eddy Merckx (BEL) (5 wins)
- Most recent: Tadej Pogačar (SLO)

Liège–Bastogne–Liège [ljɛʒ.bas.tɔɲ.ljɛʒ], also known as La Doyenne ("The Old Lady"), (Note: Doyenne is the female form of doyen, a French word literally meaning "dean". In its metaphorical meaning it denotes the most respected or prominent person in a particular field, usually the most senior person. Hence, la doyenne [la dwa.jɛn] roughly translates as "the oldest, most respected lady".) is a one-day classic cycling race in Belgium. First run in 1892, it is the oldest of the five Monuments of the European professional road cycling calendar; usually coming as the last of the spring classics. It is held annually in late April, in the Ardennes region of Belgium, from Liège to Bastogne and back.

It is considered one of the most arduous one-day cycling events in the world because of its length and demanding course. The most successful rider with five victories is Belgian rider Eddy Merckx, trailed by Italian Moreno Argentin in the 1980s and Spaniard Alejandro Valverde in the 2000s, who both won the race four times.

Liège–Bastogne–Liège is part of the UCI World Tour competition. It is the concluding race of the Ardennes Classics series, which includes the Amstel Gold Race (not technically in the Ardennes, but treated as part of the series) and La Flèche Wallonne ('The Walloon Arrow'). Both Liège and La Fleche are organised by French owner Amaury Sport Organisation, which also organises the Tour de France and Paris–Roubaix.

It generally marks the end of the entire spring classics season, as the one-day races give way to the stage races and grand tours; Liège is generally followed almost immediately by the week-long Giro d'Italia warm-up, the Tour de Romandie. The parcours, with its multiple short, hard climbs, is seen as friendlier terrain for general classification riders and climbers than the gravelled and cobbled classics of early spring.

In 2017, the Liège–Bastogne–Liège Femmes was inaugurated and added to the UCI Women's World Tour, becoming the second of the cycling monuments to introduce a women's edition after the Tour of Flanders in 2014. In 2020 a third women's 'monument', Paris-Roubaix Femmes was added, creating a triple crown of women's monuments.

== History ==
=== Spa-Bastogne-Spa ===
Like many of cycling's classics, Liège–Bastogne–Liège was first organized by a French-Belgian newspaper (L'Express). The route has always stayed in the southern, French-speaking (and hillier), part of Belgium where Liège and Bastogne are located.

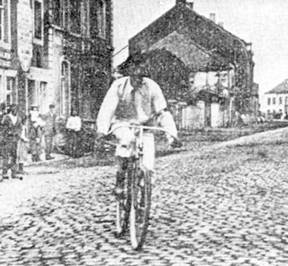
Léon Houa won the first three editions of Liège–Bastogne–Liège in the late 19th century.

The race had its first running for amateurs in 1892, from Spa to Bastogne and back, over a 250 km distance. As bicycles were expensive in the late 19th century, cycling was considered an exclusive sport for the wealthy, and the event was considered a "gentlemen's affair". 33 riders from the Liège cycling union and the Pesant Club Liégois, all Belgians and most of them from Liège, took the start. Only 17 finished. The course halfway turn point was the train station in Bastogne, chosen because of its convenience for race officials. Some tired riders abandoned the race in Bastogne and took the train back to Spa. Léon Houa, a Liège native, won the race after 10 hours and 48 minutes on the bike. The second-place finisher, Léon Lhoest, came in at 22 minutes, the third, Louis Rasquinet, at 44 minutes. Riders kept arriving for another five hours.

Houa won again the next year, over the same course, this time by a margin of a half hour. In 1894 the first race for professionals was held, and the average speed rose from 23.3 km/h (14.5 mph) to 25 km/h (16 mph). Houa concluded his third win, by seven minutes over Rasquinet. Frenchman Maurice Garin, who would later become the first winner of the Tour de France, finished fourth. After the inaugural three editions, the race was not organized for another 14 years, after which it was sometimes open only to amateurs and semi-professionals.

The race was resumed in 1908, with a start and finish in Liège for the first time. It was won by Frenchman André Trousselier. In 1909 the winner, Eugène Charlier, was disqualified because he had changed bikes. Victor Fastre was declared winner. The event was cancelled during World War I but resumed in 1919. The race was mainly won by Belgians, but started to attract more riders from Flanders, the bike-crazed northern part of Belgium, who began to dominate the event. Fleming Alfons Schepers gained three victories in the Interwar period.

=== Ardennes Classic ===
Liège–Bastogne–Liège had some interruptions during World War II, but was again a calendar-fixture as from 1945 and began to attract some of the stars of European cycling. In 1951 the race was added to the Challenge Desgrange-Colombo, the competition that combined cycling's greatest races at the time. Swiss Ferdinand Kübler won the race in 1951 and 1952. Belgian favourite Raymond Impanis became the race's eternal runner-up, with four second places but never a victory.

In the late 1950s Fred De Bruyne won the race three times in his first three participations, equalling the former record of Houa and Schepers. In 1957 two riders were declared winner. Germain Derijcke was first over the finish line, but he had crossed a closed level crossing. Derijcke had won by a three-minute lead and judges felt he had not gained that much time from illegally crossing the railway, thereby not disqualifying him. Officials compromised to promote second-place rider Frans Schoubben to first as well. In 1959 Liège–Bastogne–Liège became part of the Super Prestige, successor of the Desgrange-Colombo competition and early precursor of the UCI World Tour, making the Ardennes Classic one of the main cycling events of the year.

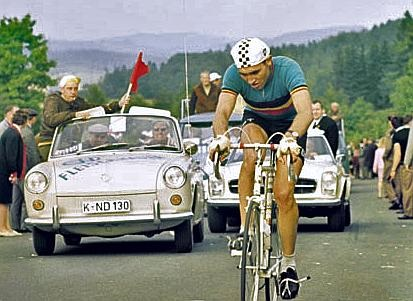
Record winner Eddy Merckx won Liège–Bastogne–Liège five times.

In 1969 began the era of cycling icon Eddy Merckx, who gained five victories, three of which consecutive, and a total of seven podium finishes. The 1971 race was run in appalling conditions, with snow and cold ravaging the peloton. Merckx gained one of his most memorable victories. The Belgian attacked in solo at 92 kilometers from the finish and soon had a five-minute advantage over his pursuiters. In a rare display, he suffered a sudden fatigue near the end and was joined by Georges Pintens. Pintens failed to distance a tired Merckx, and Merckx managed to outsprint his fellow Belgian to his second victory in the classic. In 1972 the finish moved to Verviers, 15 km from Liège, but because of fans' protest, this was a one-year occasion. The edition was again won by Merckx. In 1975 The Cannibal sealed his fifth and final victory, making him the sole record-holder of La Doyenne.

French cycling great, Bernard Hinault won the race twice, both times in harrowing weather conditions. In 1977 Hinault made a late escape from a six-strong group including a faltering Eddy Merckx; three years later he won the epic contest of 1980 in torrential snowfall and glacial temperatures.

In the 1980s, Italian classics specialist Moreno Argentin won the race four times, narrowly missing Merckx's record. Argentin also gained three victories in the sister classic La Flèche Wallonne, earning him the title of King of the Ardennes in his day.

=== Finish in Ans ===
In 1990, the Pesant Club Liégeois partnered with the Société du Tour de France, the organizer of cycling's flagships events of Tour de France and Paris–Roubaix. The partnership led to a more professional organization, resulting in a complete overhauling of the race course: the start and finish moved to different locations in Liège and five new climbs were included.

In the late 1990s, Italians Michele Bartoli and Paolo Bettini continued a tradition of Italian victories in La Doyenne, with two wins each. In 1997, Bartoli and Laurent Jalabert made a decisive breakaway on the climb of La Redoute, 40 km from the finish. Both riders worked together and Bartoli broke away from the Frenchman on the steep slopes in the final kilometer of the race. Jalabert, a specialist of the Ardennes races, finished second two years in a row but failed to win the Doyenne. In 1999, Bartoli sought a third consecutive win, but his effort was thwarted by young Belgian Frank Vandenbroucke who controlled the race and stunned followers with his victory.

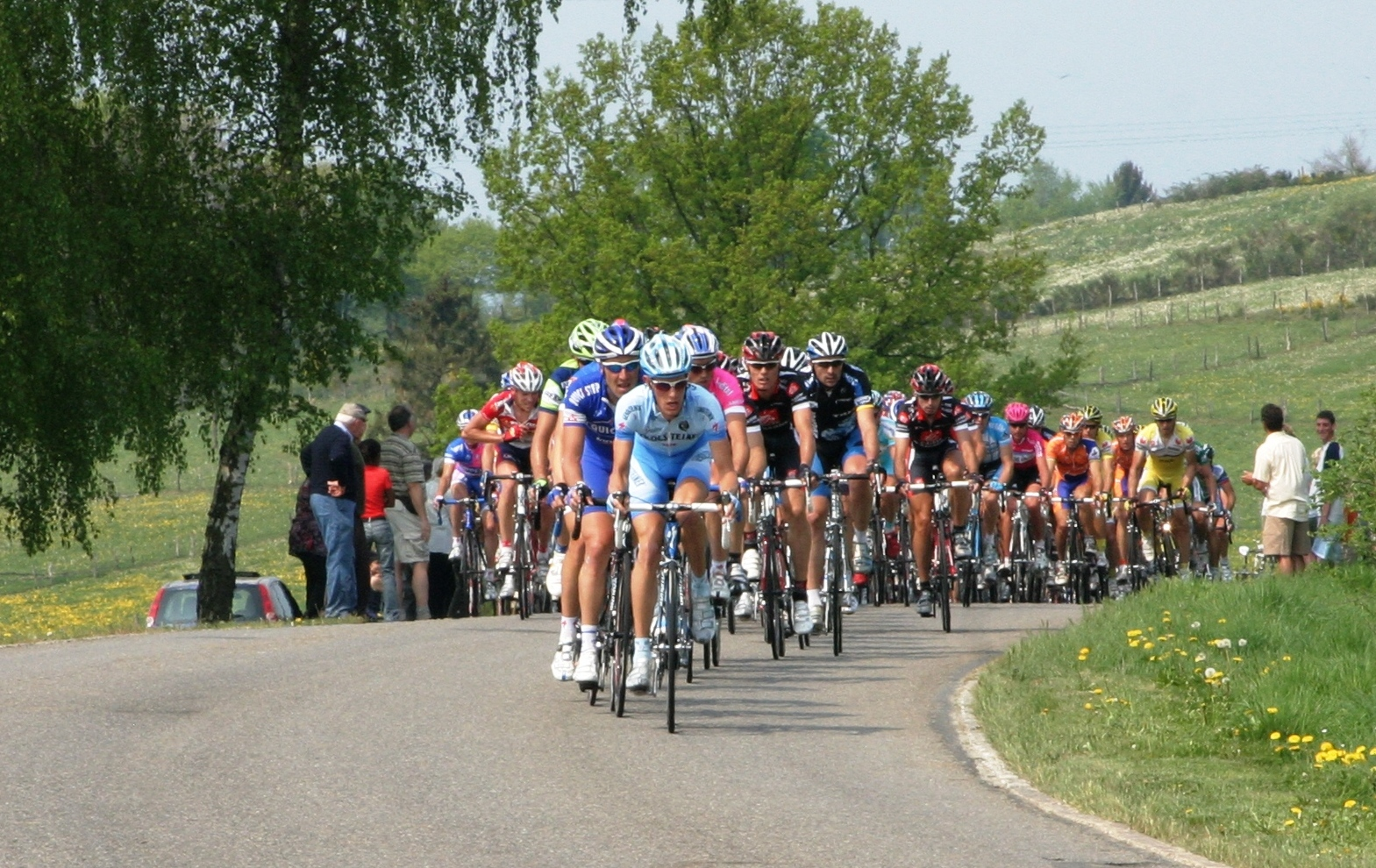
Peloton in Liège–Bastogne–Liège 2007 near Tavigny.

In 2005, Kazakh Alexander Vinokourov and German Jens Voigt broke away from the peloton 80 km from the end. Although the escape seemed unlikely to stay away in modern cycling, the two riders made it to the finish ahead of the peloton, with Vinokourov beating Voigt in the sprint.

Other memorable editions were the races of 2009 and 2010. In 2009, young Luxembourger Andy Schleck produced a solo breakaway to beat a strong field and win the race. In 2010, Alexander Vinokourov concluded his second victory by outsprinting his breakaway companion Alexander Kolobnev. The victory was controversial, not only because Vinokourov had recently returned to cycling after a doping ban, but also because it was suggested he had 'bought' the victory. Swiss magazine L'Illustré published e-mail correspondence between the winner and runner-up that suggests Vinokourov paid Kolobnev €100,000 not to contest the final sprint. Both riders were later charged with bribery by Belgian authorities.

In the 2010s, Spanish allrounder Alejandro Valverde won four times, all sprint victories of a select group at the finish. In 2016, the race was affected by snow with the race partially rerouted.

=== Finish in Liège ===
In 2019, the finish of the race moved back to Liège, with a flat run to the finish. In the 2020s, Slovenian rider Tadej Pogačar won the race four times, with three of his wins involving a solo escape.

== Route ==
=== Present course ===
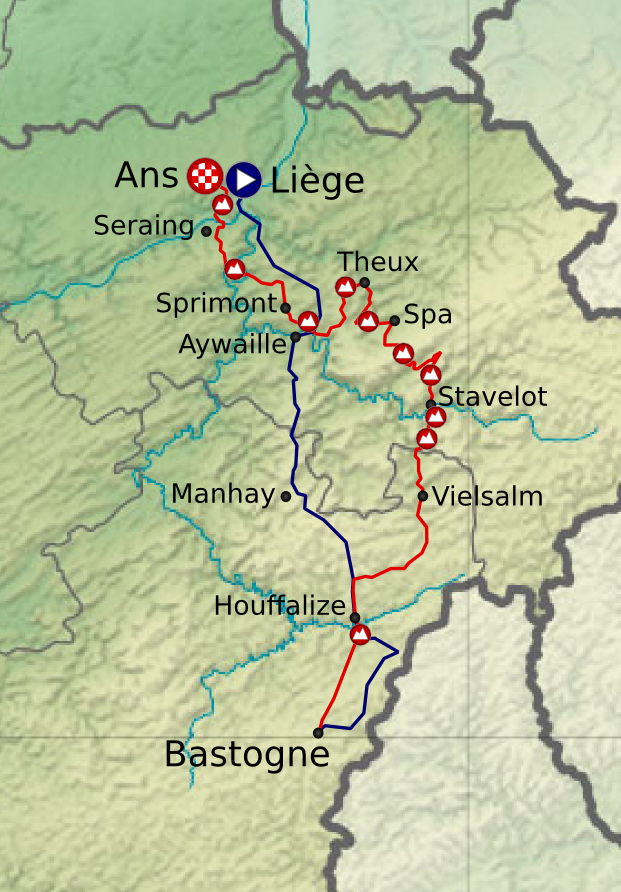
Route map of the 2011 edition.

The route of Liège–Bastogne–Liège crosses the two eastern Walloon provinces, Liège and Luxembourg, from north to south and back. Its distance is more or less fixed at 250–260 km. The race starts in the center of Liège, after which the course follows a straightforward 95 km (59 mi) route southwards to Bastogne, and a winding 163 km (101 mi) route back to Liège.

The second half of the course contains numerous climbs, such as the Stockeu, Haute-Levée, La Redoute, and the Côte de la Roche-aux-Faucons, before finishing in Liège. In the final 15 km of the race, the course makes a remarkable transition from the meadowy and agrarian landscapes in the Ardennes to the post-industrial urban scenery of Liège.

=== Course changes ===
Until 1991, the race finished in Liège's city center. In 1992, the finish moved to the industrial suburb of Ans, on the northwestern side of the city. The steep Côte de Saint-Nicolas was included in the final kilometres, along with a final climb to the finish in Ans. The move implied profound changes to the character of the race, as climbers with a strong uphill-sprint in recent years often wait until the final stretches to launch their ultimate attack.

The route usually has some minor changes every year, with some climbs skipped and others added, but the traditional finale containing the Côte de La Redoute, Côte de la Roche-aux-Faucons and Côte de Saint-Nicolas was a fixture for 27 years. (Note: Because of the composition of its immigrant population, and the many Italian flags hanging out the windows, Saint-Nicolas is nicknamed the "Italian hill".)

In 2019, the finish line moved back into the centre of Liège, with a flat run-in towards the finish. Both the Côte de Saint-Nicolas and the final climb to Ans were thereby removed from the route. The Côte de la Roche-aux-Faucons is the final named climb, topping out at 13 km from the finish but the climbing continues after a short descent off of La Roche, with the final uphill topping out approximately 10.5 km from the finish line.

== Race characteristics ==
=== Demands ===
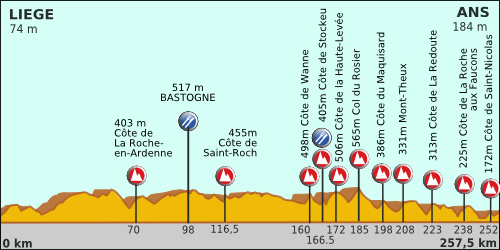
Profile of the 2012 edition

Liège–Bastogne–Liège is considered one of the most arduous one-day races in the world because of its length and succession of steep climbs. Every edition, about a dozen climbs – ranging in length, gradient and difficulty – are addressed, offering opportunities to attack. The British magazine Cycling Weekly stated:

In purely physical terms, this is probably the toughest classic: the climbs are long, most of them are pretty steep as well, and they come up with depressing frequency in the final kilometres.

Four-times winner Moreno Argentin said:

Riders who win in Liège are what we call fondisti – men with a superior level of stamina. [The climb of] La Redoute is like the Mur de Huy in that it has to be tackled at pace, from the front of the peloton. The gradient is about 14 or 15 per cent, and it comes after 220 or 230 kilometers, so you don't have to be a genius to work out how tough it is. I remember that we used to go up with a maximum of 39 x 21 – it's not quite as steep as the Mur de Huy. A lot of riders mistakenly think you should attack on the hardest part, but in reality you hurt people on the slightly flatter section that comes after this.
Liège is a race of trial by elimination, where it's very unlikely that a breakaway can go clear and decide the race before the final 100 km [62 mi]. You need to be strong and at the same time clever and calculating — in this sense it's a complete test of a cyclist's ability.

=== Climbs ===
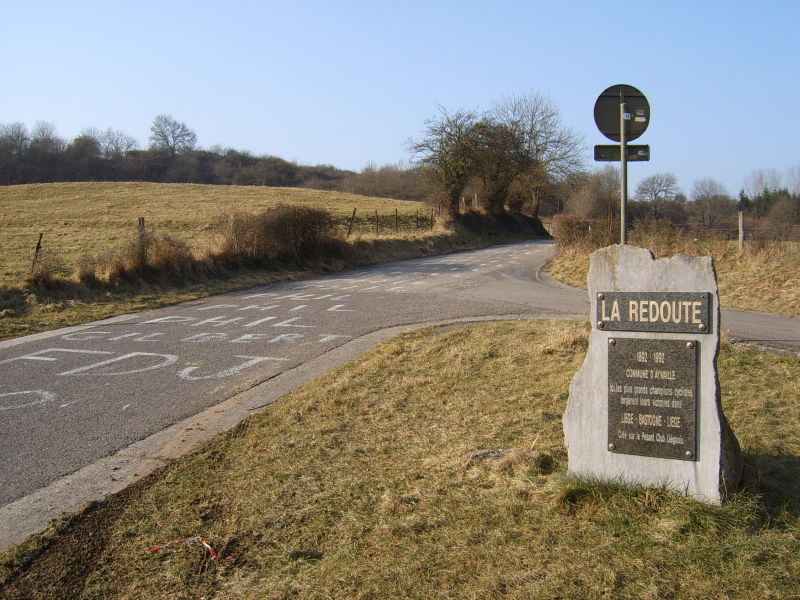
The foot of the Côte de La Redoute in Aywaille.

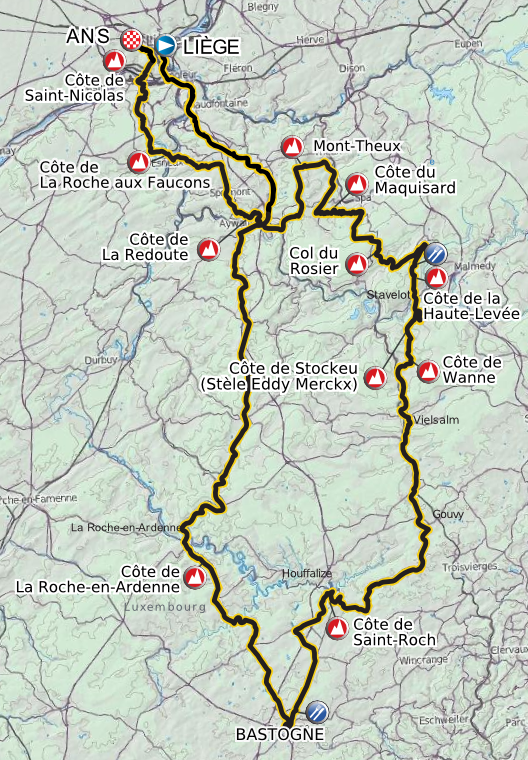
The climbs in the 2012 edition

The most well-known hill is the Côte de La Redoute, the 2.0 km climb in Aywaille at an average gradient of 8.9% with slopes of over 20%. For a long time in the 1980s and 1990s La Redoute, at ca. 40 km from the finish, was the breaking point of the race and often the place where decisive breakaways were launched. In recent years the climb seems to have lost that particular role, as many riders are able to keep up with the pace on the climb and race favourites often wait until the last stages of the race to make a break.

In modern cycling, as in many bike races, the decisive stretches have evolved towards the final climbs of the day. When the race finished in Ans, the Côte de Saint-Nicolas was the last categorized climb of the race, with the top at 6 km from the finish. It is a precipitous and atypical climb because it is not part of the forested hills in the Ardennes, but located in the middle of the industrial suburbs of Liège along the Meuse river. In 2016, the organisers inserted the 600 m cobbled Côte de la Rue Naniot following the Côte de Saint-Nicolas, but preceding the finish in Ans. This turned out to be a one-off, however, as the race has not used the climb since.

Since the finish returned to Liège in 2019, the Côte de Saint-Nicolas has been removed from the route, and the decisive climbs are once again the Côte de la Redoute, Côte des Forges and Côte de la Roche-aux-Faucons.

Course changes are frequent from year to year. Climbs are sometimes cut or others included. These are the climbs in recent editions:

Climbs of the 2019 Liège–Bastogne–Liège
km mark	Name	Distance	Slope
75.0	Côte de la Roche-en-Ardenne	2.8 km	6.2%
121.0	Côte de Saint-Roch	1.0 km	11.2%
161.0	Côte de Mont-le-Soie	1.7 km	7.9%
169.5	Côte de Wanne	3.6 km	5.1%
176.0	Côte de Stockeu	1.0 km	12.5%
181.5	Côte de la Haute-Levée	3.6 km	5.6%
194.5	Côte du Rosier	4.4 km	5.9%
207.0	Col du Maquisard	2.5 km	5.0%
219.0	Côte de la Redoute	2.0 km	8.9%
231.0	Côte des Forges	1.3 km	7.8%
241.0	Côte de la Roche-aux-Faucons	1.3 km	11.0%

=== Weather ===
The weather in April is often unpredictable and the race has repeatedly been affected by harsh weather conditions. In 1919, 1957, 1980, and 2016 there was severe snowfall. The edition of 1980 was exceptionally hard: snow fell from the start and temperatures were near freezing point, leading commentators to call it 'Neige-Bastogne-Neige' (Snow-Bastogne-Snow). Bernard Hinault attacked with 80 km (50 mi) to go and finished nearly 10 minutes ahead.

A feature published by the British magazine, Procycling in 2000, described the infamous race:

A cold wind that blew across Belgium brought snow flakes and then a heavy fall within moments of the race starting. [...] Riders struggled on, with hands to faces to keep a view of the road. The race was an anonymous mass of plastic jackets and windcheaters. Spectators stood in goggles like upmarket snowmen, red-faced in the bitterness. Within the hour some teams had barely a man left on the road. They pulled out two dozen at a time, men like Gibi Baronchelli and Giuseppe Saronni, Lucien Van Impe and Jean-René Bernaudeau.

Bernard Hinault, the winner, was one of just 21 riders to finish the race of 174 starters. It took three weeks for proper movement to return to two fingers of his right hand.

== Ardennes classics ==
Liège–Bastogne–Liège is the concluding race of the Ardennes classics series, which includes La Flèche Wallonne. Both are organised by ASO.

The Flèche Wallonne ("Walloon Arrow"), although younger than Liège–Bastogne–Liège, was longtime considered the more prestigious event of the two Ardennes Classics, showing how prestige and importance of a race can sometimes change over time. At one time, Flèche Wallonne and Liège–Bastogne–Liège were run on successive days known as Le Weekend Ardennais, with Liège–Bastogne–Liège organized on Saturday and the Flèche Wallonne on Sunday.

Only eight riders have won both races in the same year: Spanish rider Alejandro Valverde three times (2006, 2015 and 2017), Swiss rider Ferdinand Kübler twice (in 1951 and 1952), Belgians Stan Ockers (1955), Eddy Merckx (1972), and Philippe Gilbert (2011), Italians Moreno Argentin (1991) and Davide Rebellin (2004), and Slovenian rider Tadej Pogačar (2025).

In 2011, Belgian rider Philippe Gilbert won Liège–Bastogne–Liège, completing a unique streak of classics victories in a span of ten days. Gilbert had previously won the Brabantse Pijl, Amstel Gold Race and La Flèche Wallonne, thus achieving a historic quadruple of victories in the hilly classics of April. Gilbert beat Luxembourg brothers Fränck and Andy Schleck in a sprint of three.

== Winners ==
Year	Country	Rider	Team
1892	Belgium	Léon Houa	–
1893	Belgium	Léon Houa	–
1894	Belgium	Léon Houa	–
1895–1907	No race		
1908	France	André Trousselier	–
1909	Belgium	Victor Fastre	–
1910	No race		
1911	Belgium	Joseph Van Daele	–
1912	Belgium	Omer Verschoore	–
1913	Belgium	Maurits Moritz	–
1914–1918	No race		
1919	Belgium	Léon Devos	–
1920	Belgium	Léon Scieur	La Sportive
1921	Belgium	Louis Mottiat	La Sportive
1922	Belgium	Louis Mottiat	Alcyon–Dunlop
1923	Belgium	René Vermandel	Alcyon–Dunlop
1924	Belgium	René Vermandel	Alcyon–Dunlop
1925	Belgium	Georges Ronsse	–
1926	Belgium	Dieudonné Smets	–
1927	Belgium	Maurice Raes	–
1928	Belgium	Ernest Mottard	–
1929	Belgium	Alfons Schepers	–
1930	Germany	Hermann Buse	Duerkopp
1931	Belgium	Alfons Schepers	La Française
1932	Belgium	Marcel Houyoux	–
1933	Belgium	François Gardier	Cycles De Pas
1934	Belgium	Theo Herckenrath	La Française
1935	Belgium	Alfons Schepers	Dilecta
1936	Belgium	Albert Beckaert	Alcyon–Dunlop
1937	Belgium	Éloi Meulenberg	Alcyon–Dunlop
1938	Belgium	Alfons Deloor	Helyett–Hutchinson
1939	Belgium	Albert Ritserveldt	Dilecta–De Dion
1940–1942	No race		
1943	Belgium	Richard Depoorter	Helyett–Hutchinson
1944	No race		
1945	Belgium	Jean Engels	Alcyon–Dunlop
1946	Belgium	Prosper Depredomme	Dilecta–Wolber–Garin
1947	Belgium	Richard Depoorter	Garin–Wolber
1948	Belgium	Maurice Mollin	Mercier–Hutchinson
1949	France	Camille Danguillaume	Peugeot–Dunlop
1950	Belgium	Prosper Depredomme	Girardengo
1951	Switzerland	Ferdinand Kübler	Fréjus–Ursus
1952	Switzerland	Ferdinand Kübler	Fréjus
1953	Belgium	Alois De Hertog	Alcyon–Dunlop
1954	Luxembourg	Marcel Ernzer	Terrot–Hutchinson
1955	Belgium	Stan Ockers	Elvé–Peugeot
1956	Belgium	Fred De Bruyne	Mercier–BP–Hutchinson
1957	Belgium	Frans Schoubben (victory shared with Germain Derycke)	Elvé–Peugeot
1957	Belgium	Germain Derycke (victory shared with Frans Schoubben)	Faema–Guerra
1958	Belgium	Fred De Bruyne	Carpano
1959	Belgium	Fred De Bruyne	Carpano
1960	Netherlands	Albertus Geldermans	Saint-Raphaël–R. Geminiani–Dunlop
1961	Belgium	Rik Van Looy	Faema
1962	Belgium	Jef Planckaert	Flandria–Faema–Clément
1963	Belgium	Frans Melckenbeeck	Mercier–BP–Hutchinson
1964	Belgium	Willy Blocklandt	Flandria–Romeo
1965	Italy	Carmine Preziosi	Pelforth–Sauvage–Lejeune
1966	France	Jacques Anquetil	Ford France–Hutchinson
1967	Belgium	Walter Godefroot	Flandria–De Clerck
1968	Belgium	Valere Van Sweevelt	Smith's
1969	Belgium	Eddy Merckx	Faema
1970	Belgium	Roger De Vlaeminck	Flandria–Mars
1971	Belgium	Eddy Merckx	Molteni
1972	Belgium	Eddy Merckx	Molteni
1973	Belgium	Eddy Merckx	Molteni
1974	Belgium	Georges Pintens	MIC–Ludo–de Gribaldy
1975	Belgium	Eddy Merckx	Molteni–RYC
1976	Belgium	Joseph Bruyère	Molteni–Campagnolo
1977	France	Bernard Hinault	Gitane–Campagnolo
1978	Belgium	Joseph Bruyère	C&A
1979	West Germany	Dietrich Thurau	IJsboerke–Warncke Eis
1980	France	Bernard Hinault	Renault–Gitane
1981	Switzerland	Josef Fuchs	Cilo–Aufina
1982	Italy	Silvano Contini	Bianchi–Piaggio
1983	Netherlands	Steven Rooks	Sem–France Loire–Reydel–Mavic
1984	Ireland	Sean Kelly	Skil–Reydel–Sem–Mavic
1985	Italy	Moreno Argentin	Sammontana–Bianchi
1986	Italy	Moreno Argentin	Sammontana–Bianchi
1987	Italy	Moreno Argentin	Gewiss–Bianchi
1988	Netherlands	Adri van der Poel	PDM–Ultima–Concorde
1989	Ireland	Sean Kelly	PDM–Ultima–Concorde
1990	Belgium	Eric Van Lancker	Panasonic–Sportlife
1991	Italy	Moreno Argentin	Ariostea
1992	Belgium	Dirk De Wolf	Gatorade–Chateau d'Ax
1993	Denmark	Rolf Sørensen	Carrera Jeans–Tassoni
1994	Russia	Eugeni Berzin	Gewiss–Ballan
1995	Switzerland	Mauro Gianetti	Polti–Granarolo–Santini
1996	Switzerland	Pascal Richard	MG Maglificio–Technogym
1997	Italy	Michele Bartoli	MG Maglificio–Technogym
1998	Italy	Michele Bartoli	Asics–CGA
1999	Belgium	Frank Vandenbroucke	Cofidis
2000	Italy	Paolo Bettini	Mapei–Quick-Step
2001	Switzerland	Oscar Camenzind	Lampre–Daikin
2002	Italy	Paolo Bettini	Mapei–Quick-Step
2003	United States	Tyler Hamilton	Team CSC
2004	Italy	Davide Rebellin	Gerolsteiner
2005	Kazakhstan	Alexandre Vinokourov	T-Mobile Team
2006	Spain	Alejandro Valverde	Caisse d'Epargne–Illes Balears
2007	Italy	Danilo Di Luca	Liquigas
2008	Spain	Alejandro Valverde	Caisse d'Epargne
2009	Luxembourg	Andy Schleck	Team Saxo Bank
2010	Kazakhstan	Alexandre Vinokourov	Astana
2011	Belgium	Philippe Gilbert	Omega Pharma–Lotto
2012	Kazakhstan	Maxim Iglinsky	Astana
2013	Ireland	Dan Martin	Garmin–Sharp
2014	Australia	Simon Gerrans	Orica–GreenEDGE
2015	Spain	Alejandro Valverde	Movistar Team
2016	Netherlands	Wout Poels	Team Sky
2017	Spain	Alejandro Valverde	Movistar Team
2018	Luxembourg	Bob Jungels	Quick-Step Floors
2019	Denmark	Jakob Fuglsang	Astana
2020	Slovenia	Primož Roglič	Team Jumbo–Visma
2021	Slovenia	Tadej Pogačar	UAE Team Emirates
2022	Belgium	Remco Evenepoel	Quick-Step Alpha Vinyl Team
2023	Belgium	Remco Evenepoel	Soudal–Quick-Step
2024	Slovenia	Tadej Pogačar	UAE Team Emirates
2025	Slovenia	Tadej Pogačar	UAE Team Emirates XRG
2026	Slovenia	Tadej Pogačar	UAE Team Emirates XRG

=== Multiple winners ===
Active riders are in italic.

Wins	Rider	Years
5	Eddy Merckx (BEL)	1969, 1971, 1972, 1973, 1975
4	Moreno Argentin (ITA)	1985, 1986, 1987, 1991
4	Alejandro Valverde (ESP)	2006, 2008, 2015, 2017
4	Tadej Pogačar (SLO)	2021, 2024, 2025, 2026
3	Léon Houa (BEL)	1892, 1893, 1894
3	Alphonse Schepers (BEL)	1929, 1931, 1935
3	Fred De Bruyne (BEL)	1956, 1958, 1959
2	Louis Mottiat (BEL)	1921, 1922
2	René Vermandel (BEL)	1923, 1924
2	Richard Depoorter (BEL)	1943, 1947
2	Prosper Depredomme (BEL)	1946, 1950
2	Ferdinand Kübler (SUI)	1951, 1952
2	Joseph Bruyère (BEL)	1976, 1978
2	Bernard Hinault (FRA)	1977, 1980
2	Seán Kelly (IRL)	1984, 1989
2	Michele Bartoli (ITA)	1997, 1998
2	Paolo Bettini (ITA)	2000, 2002
2	Alexander Vinokourov (KAZ)	2005, 2010
2	Remco Evenepoel (BEL)	2022, 2023

=== Wins per country ===
Wins	Country
61	Belgium
12	Italy
6	Switzerland
5	France; Slovenia
4	Netherlands; Spain
3	Ireland; Kazakhstan; Luxembourg
2	Denmark; Germany
1	Australia; Russia; United States

== Liège–Bastogne–Liège Femmes ==
In 2017, Liège–Bastogne–Liège Femmes in the UCI Women's World Tour was inaugurated, following the example of La Flèche Wallonne Féminine and Women's Amstel Gold Race. The first Liège–Bastogne–Liège Femmes, run on 23 April 2017, was won by Olympic champion Anna van der Breggen of the Netherlands.

At 135.5 km, the race is approximately half the distance of the men's event. Hence, it does not start in Liège but in Bastogne, from where it heads north past Liège to finish in Ans on the same location as the men's race. The route features four categorized climbs: the Côte de la Vecquée, Côte de La Redoute, Côte de la Roche aux faucons and Côte de Saint-Nicolas. The top of the last climb of Saint-Nicolas comes at 5.5 km from the finish.
