= 1922 Liège–Bastogne–Liège =

Race details
- Dates: 9 April 1922
- Stages: 1
- Distance: 218 km (135 mi)
- Winning time: 7h 27' 30"

Results
	Winner	Louis Mottiat (BEL)
	Second	Albert Jordens (BEL)
	Third	Laurent Seret (BEL)

The 1922 Liège–Bastogne–Liège was the 12th edition of the Liège–Bastogne–Liège cycle race and was held on 9 April 1922. The race started and finished in Liège. The race was won by Louis Mottiat.

== General classification ==
Final general classification

Rank	Rider	Time
1	Louis Mottiat (BEL)	7h 27' 30"
2	Albert Jordens (BEL)	+ 0"
3	Laurent Seret (BEL)	+ 0"
4	Jules-Richard Matton (BEL)	+ 0"
5	Hubert Noël (BEL)	+ 0"
6	Henri Hanlet (BEL)	+ 0"
7	Jacques Coomans (BEL)	+ 0"
8	Joseph Jeanfils (BEL)	+ 0"
8	Guillaume Macquoi (BEL)	+ 0"
8	Joseph Marchand (BEL)	+ 0"
