= 1892 Liège–Bastogne–Liège =

Race details
- Dates: 29 May 1892
- Stages: 1
- Distance: 250 km (160 mi)
- Winning time: 10h 48' 36"

Results
	Winner	Léon Houa (BEL)
	Second	Léon Lhoest (BEL)
	Third	Louis Rasquinet (BEL)

The 1892 Liège–Bastogne–Liège was the inaugural edition of the Liège–Bastogne–Liège cycle race and was held on 29 May 1892. Léon Houa won the race, which started and finished in Liège.

== General classification ==
Final general classification

Rank	Rider	Time
1	Léon Houa (BEL)	10h 48' 36"
2	Léon Lhoest (BEL)	+ 22' 00"
3	Louis Rasquinet (BEL)	+ 44' 00"
4	Antoine Gehenniaux (BEL)	+ 57' 00"
5	Henri Thanghe (BEL)	+ 59' 00"
6	Jos Berchmans (BEL)	+ 1h 11' 00"
7	Gustave Ghiot (BEL)	+ 1h 22' 00"
8	René Nulens (BEL)	+ 1h 42' 00"
9	Maurice Tips (BEL)	+ 1h 58' 00"
10	Willem Muller (BEL)	+ 2h 31' 00"
