= 1946 Liège–Bastogne–Liège =

Race details
- Dates: 5 May 1946
- Stages: 1
- Distance: 205 km (127 mi)
- Winning time: 6h 02' 50"

Results
	Winner	Prosper Depredomme (BEL)
	Second	Albert Hendrickx (BEL)
	Third	Triphon Verstraeten (BEL)

The 1946 Liège–Bastogne–Liège was the 32nd edition of the Liège–Bastogne–Liège cycle race and was held on 5 May 1946. The race started and finished in Liège. The race was won by Prosper Depredomme.

== General classification ==
Final general classification

Rank	Rider	Time
1	Prosper Depredomme (BEL)	6h 02' 50"
2	Albert Hendrickx (BEL)	+ 0"
3	Triphon Verstraeten (BEL)	+ 0"
4	Joseph Somers (BEL)	+ 0"
5	Émile Carrara (FRA)	+ 0"
6	Edward Van Dijck (BEL)	+ 1' 35"
7	Joseph Claessen (BEL)	+ 1' 35"
8	Marcel Boumon (BEL)	+ 1' 35"
9	Eugene Kiewit (BEL)	+ 1' 35"
10	René Beyens (BEL)	+ 1' 35"
