= Albert Baker d'Isy =

French sports journalist (1906–1968)

Albert Baker d'Isy (b. Paris 18 April 1906, d. 20 May 1968) was a French cycling journalist and author and the founder of the Grand Prix des Nations international time-trial. He is considered, in the French expression, "one of the most beautiful pens" of sports writing. Pierre Chany a contemporary, called him "The best sporting journalist of his generation."

== Biography ==
Albert Baker d'Isy worked at L'Écho des Sports, a sports newspaper which appeared erratically between 1904 and 1957. In 1934, he became one of its main cycling writers, along with René de Latour, who was also foreign correspondent of the British monthly, Sporting Cyclist. By that time, he was also writing for the larger daily, Paris-Soir, which he joined in 1931.

With Paris-Soir′s sports editor, Gaston Bénac, he created the Critérium National, a road race limited to French riders, and the Grand Prix des Nations.

The Grand Prix began in 1932 to much suspicion among riders, because there had been no tradition of racing against the clock in continental Europe, but the race went on to become the unofficial world time-trial championship. Paris-Soir created both races in competition with L'Auto, the national sports daily which ran the Tour de France. Rivalry between the publications was so intense that Henri Desgrange, the organiser, changed the time of race finishes so to make them too late for Paris-Soir to report.

Baker d'Isy and Bénac got the idea of an international time-trial after watching the world championship road race in Copenhagen in 1931, which unusually had been run that way. The two decided that the novelty would ensure their paper publicity and that running a time-trial would cost less than a conventional road race. Baker d'Isy came up with the name and he and René de Latour claim to have found the route. Maurice Archambaud was the first winner. The route started near the Versailles château and ran round a triangle through Rambouillet, Maulette, Saint-Rémy-lès-Chevreuse, Versailles and Boulogne to finish on the Vélodrome Buffalo. There were three hills, one in the first 100 km, plenty of cobbles, and the last 40 km went through the woods of the Vallée de Chevreuse, a popular area for bike riders. The distance was 142 km.

Baker d'Isy moved after World War II to another Paris evening paper, Ce Soir. He became deputy to Georges Pagnoud in race organisation. Baker d'Isy also wrote for monthly papers, Sports and Miroir, which had been started by the Communist Party.

Ce Soir failed and Baker d'Isy joined L'Équipe, which had taken over from L'Auto. He was fired from L'Équipe after being sent to report from Egypt. Pierre Chany said:

The problem was that Albert always went that bit too far. When he was fired, he had just returned from a long reporting tour of Egypt. He had promised 12 articles but he only ever wrote the first. The paper had announced that the next 11 instalments were to follow, but they never appeared. Baker just wrote 11 titles on a sheet of paper. For the rest, he left a blank page. Out of respect for his readers, Jacques Goddet [the editor] could do nothing else than show him the door.

Baker d'Isy then worked at France Soir, the last newspaper of his career.

Baker d'Isy was a founder of Miroir du Cyclisme, writing about champions he had met. A collection of his reports was published as Le Tour de France. Chroniques de L’Équipe, 1954-1982 (2002, La Table Ronde, Paris).

Pierre Chany wrote of him that he had "a high forehead, a faintly projecting jaw, the dry face of a Breton sailor, a felt hat pushed back to his neck. Cycling was his family and cycling his passion."

== Decline and death ==
Baker d'Isy died in 1968 after a life of excess. He once drank a bottle of ink to show he had ink in his veins. He threw it back up on the office carpet. Chany, who told that story, also said:

Albert degenerated [in his writing]. His writing faded. The last papers he submitted didn't have the brilliance that we used to admire. He drank. He slept in the métro. We tried to help him but he wouldn't be helped and he insulted anyone who tried to alleviate his misery. At the Courrier de Lyon, a restaurant run by Aimé and Lucette Savy, those wonderful people, they kept an open table. When it wasn't Antoine Blondin it was me or one or two others who used to settle his bill as we passed.

We tried to look after him. I remember that Jacques Couvrat, who started the Super Prestige Pernod, a man who was always very attentive to others, he urged him to write a book. He found him a retreat, a monastery on the bank of the Loire I think, but nothing happened. Albert was stubborn. Albert degerated. One morning, after he'd eaten with me the previous day, he was found stretched out on the pavement in the rue Montmartre. He had no papers on him. He was taken to the Hôtel-Dieu. He died a few months later.
