= Guillaume Nyssen =

Belgian cyclist

Personal information
- Born: 14 December 1886

Cycling career
- Sport: Cycling
- Role: Rider

Guillaume Nyssen (born 14 December 1886, date of death unknown) was a Belgian racing cyclist. He rode in the 1922 Tour de France.
