= Procycling =

Bicycling sport magazine

- Cover of the final issue (January 2022), featuring Lizzie Deignan
- Editor: Ed Pickering
- Former editors: William Fotheringham, Jeremy Whittle, Peter Cossins, Cam Winstanley
- Frequency: 13 issues a year
- Circulation: 54,000
- First issue: April 1999
- Final issue: January 2022
- Company: Future
- Country: United Kingdom
- Language: English
- ISSN: 1465-7198

Procycling, or ProCycling, was a cycling sports magazine owned by Future plc. First published in April 1999, there were 13 issues a year distributed in all countries where there are English-speaking readers.

== History ==
Andrew Sutcliffe, the former editor of Cycle Trader and the IPC Media publication Cycling Weekly, helped form a company called Cabal Communications, run by other former IPC staff. Cabal introduced Procycling as a rival to IPC's own monthly publication, Cycle Sport. Its first editor was William Fotheringham, who had also been on IPC's staff. He was assisted and then succeeded by Jeremy Whittle, correspondent to The Times and author of Bad Blood. In 2003, Cabal was acquired by Highbury House.

Future plc acquired Procycling and several other magazines from Highbury House in 2005. In 2014, Future plc sold its sport and craft titles to Immediate Media. In 2019, Future reacquired Procycling from Immediate Media.

Procycling described itself as a "glossy and dynamic magazine . . . the authoritative, worldwide voice of international professional road racing, distributed in every country where there are English-speaking fans. With exclusive features and spectacular photography, Procycling brings to life the complexities, rivalries and hardships of the European professional scene."

The magazine is edited by Ed Pickering. The majority of the readers were males (90%) in their early thirties; the magazine had a global circulation of 54,000.

Procycling ceased publication in January 2022. The final issue was guest-edited by professional cyclist Lizzie Deignan.
