= Léopold Roosemont =

Belgian cyclist (1909–1963)

Personal information
- Born: 15 May 1909
- Died: 21 February 1963 (aged 53)

Cycling career
- Sport: Cycling
- Discipline: Road
- Role: Rider

Léopold Roosemont (15 May 1909 – 21 February 1963) was a Belgian racing cyclist. He rode in the 1933 Tour de France.
