= Giuseppe Brambilla =

Italian cyclist

Personal information
- Born: 25 October 1888 Melzo, Italy
- Died: 28 April 1918 (aged 29) Milan, Italy

Cycling career
- Sport: Cycling
- Role: Rider

Giuseppe Brambilla (25 October 1888 – 28 April 1918) was an Italian racing cyclist. He participated in the 7th edition of the Tour de France in 1909. In that same year he also won the Coppa del Re and placed second in the Giro dell'Emilia. He also participated in the Giro d'Italia in 1909, 1910, 1911 and 1913, but never finished the race. His participation in the first Giro d'Italia was controversial; during the second stage, he was found travelling on a train. He was disqualified and was in custody while the race continued without him.
