= Léon Houa =

Belgian cyclist

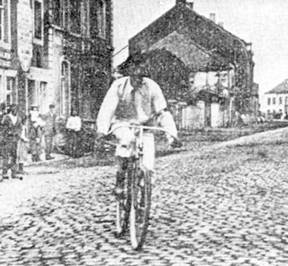

Personal information
- Full name: Léon Houa
- Born: 8 November 1867 Liège, Belgium
- Died: 31 January 1918 (aged 50) Bressoux, Belgium

Cycling career
- Sport: Cycling
- Current team: Retired
- Discipline: Road
- Role: Rider

Major wins
- Liège–Bastogne–Liège (1892–1894)

Léon Houa (8 November 1867 – 31 January 1918) was a Belgian road bicycle racer

== Career ==
He is famous for winning the first three editions of Liège–Bastogne–Liège in 1892–1894. The race has come to be known as La Doyenne ("The Old Lady"), and is one of the five 'Monuments' of the European professional road cycling calendar, and the oldest.

The first two editions of Liège–Bastogne–Liège were amateur races. On 29 May 1892, he bested 32 amateur riders over 250 km to finish the race in 10 hours, 48 minutes and 36 seconds and became the first Liège–Bastogne–Liège champion. On 28 May 1893, he finished in 10 hours, 40 minutes and ahead of 25 other riders. Also in 1893, Houa won the amateur version of the Belgium National Road Race Championship.

Houa went on to win the first professional version of the race held in 1894 in 8 hours, 52 minutes and 5 seconds over a distance of 223 km. Also in 1894, Houa captured the elite men's version of the Belgium National Road Race Championship.

In his later years, Houa was an automobile race driver. In 1910, he was driving for Renault. He died in a race accident during the Tour of Belgium.

== Major achievements ==
1892 – Amateur
1st Liège–Bastogne–Liège
1893 – Amateur
1st Liège–Bastogne–Liège
1st National (Amateur) Road Race Cycling Champion
1894 – Professional
1st Liège–Bastogne–Liège
1st Belgian National Road Race Championships
