= Maurice Moritz =

Belgian cyclist

Personal information
- Full name: Maurice Moritz

Cycling career
- Sport: Cycling
- Role: Rider

Maurice Moritz was a Belgian racing cyclist. He won the 1913 edition of the Liège–Bastogne–Liège.
