= Dieudonné Smets =

Belgian cyclist

Personal information
- Born: 17 August 1901 Oupeye, Belgium
- Died: 29 November 1981 (aged 80) Oupeye, Belgium

Cycling career
- Sport: Cycling
- Role: Rider

Dieudonné Smets (17 August 1901 – 29 November 1981) was a Belgian racing cyclist. He won the 1926 edition of the Liège–Bastogne–Liège.
