= Côte de Saint-Nicolas =

Cycling route

Coordinates: 50°38′26″N 5°32′19″E

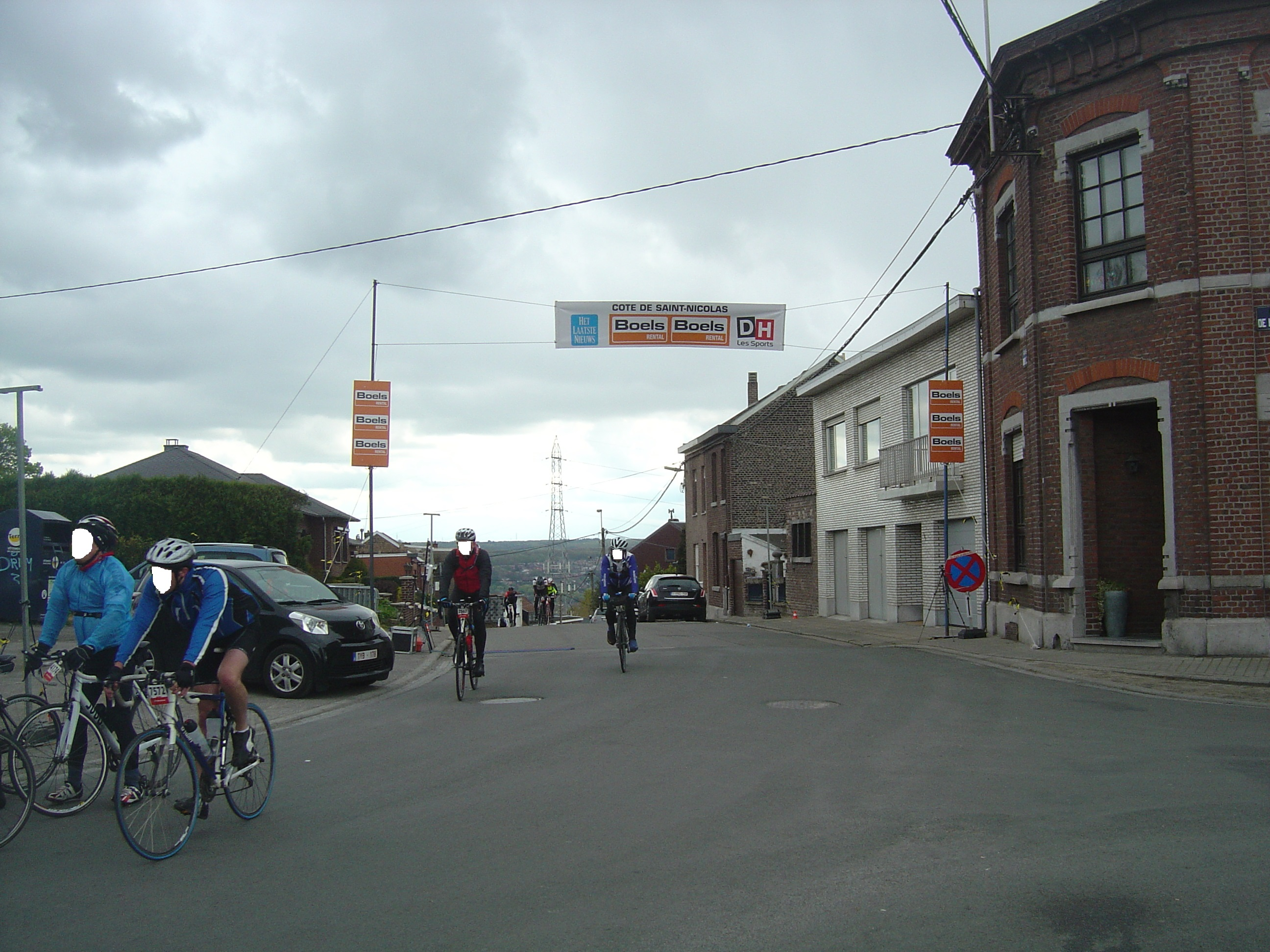
- Top of the Côte de Saint-Nicolas during the Liège-Bastogne-Liège amateur challenge
- Location: Wallonia; Belgium
- Start: Saint-Nicolas, Liège
- Gain in altitude: 102 m (335 ft)
- Length of climb: 1.42 km (0.88 mi)
- Maximum elevation: 173 m (568 ft)
- Average gradient: 7.6 %
- Maximum gradient: 13 %

The Côte de Saint-Nicolas is a climb of Wallonia in the municipality of Saint-Nicolas in Belgium. It is often included in the Liège–Bastogne–Liège cycling classic, where it comes as one of the last difficulties, at approximately 6 km from the finish in the neighbouring municipality of Ans. With a length of 1.4 km at an average gradient of 7.6%, it is often a decisive site of the race.

The climb is nicknamed The Italian Hill, because of the composition of its immigrant population and their descendants – often from Sicily and the South of Italy. Their presence is particularly expressed by the many Italian flags hanging outside the windows, especially during race day of Liège–Bastogne–Liège.
