= Prosper Depredomme =

Belgian cyclist

Personal information
- Born: 26 May 1918 Thouars, France
- Died: 8 November 1997 (aged 79) Anderlecht, Belgium

Cycling career
- Sport: Cycling
- Role: Rider

Major wins
- Liège–Bastogne–Liège (1946, 1950)

Prosper Depredomme (26 May 1918 – 8 November 1997) was a Belgian racing cyclist. He rode in the 1947 Tour de France. He won Liège–Bastogne–Liège in 1946 and 1950.
