= Hermann Buse =

German cyclist

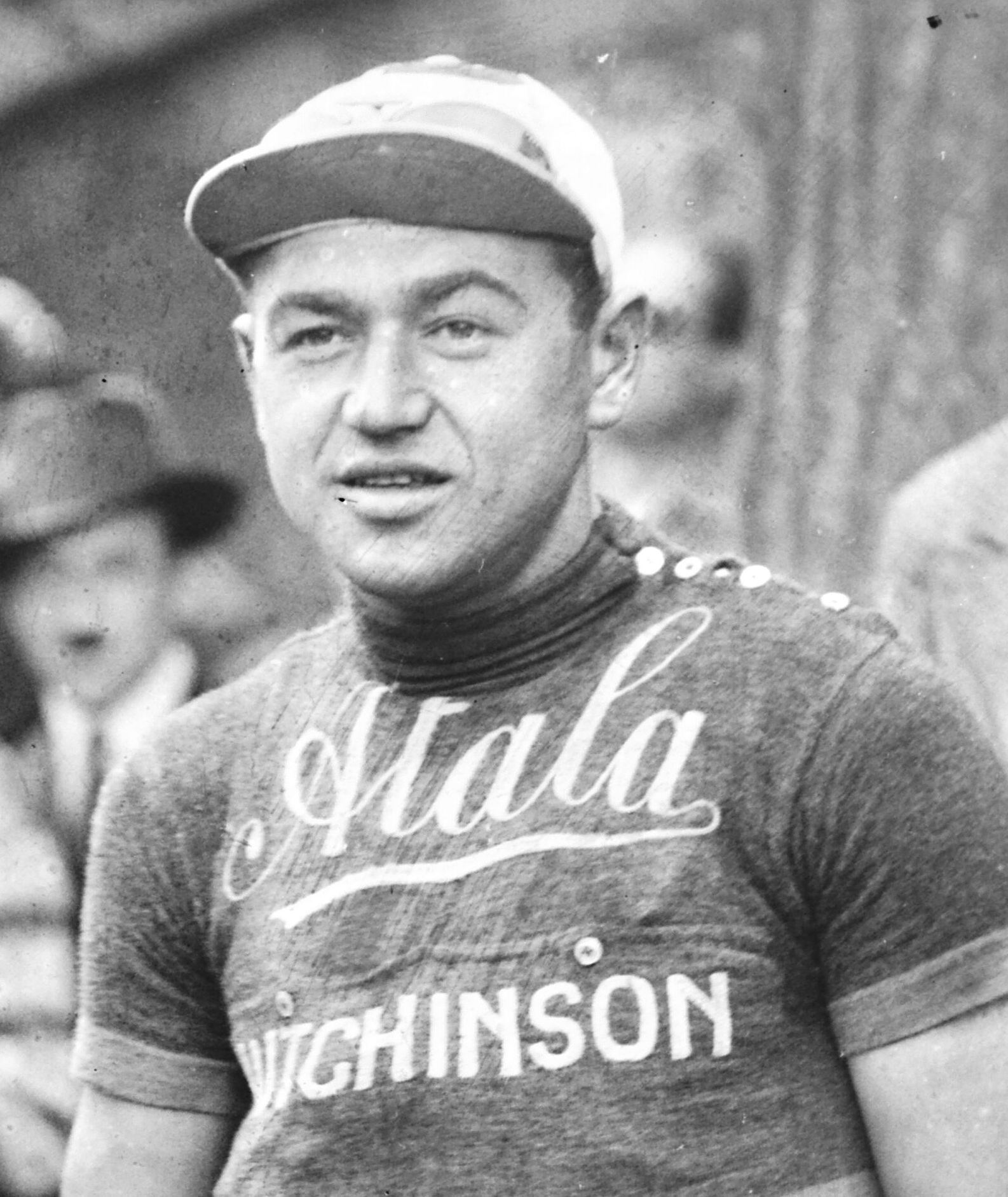
- Hermann Buse (1932)

Personal information
- Full name: Hermann Buse
- Born: 27 February 1907 Berlin, German Empire
- Died: 28 April 1945 (aged 38) Berlin, Nazi Germany

Cycling career
- Sport: Cycling
- Discipline: Road
- Role: Rider

Major wins
- Liège–Bastogne–Liège (1930)

Hermann Buse (27 February 1907 – 28 April 1945) was a German professional road bicycle racer, professional between 1929 and 1937. He won Liège–Bastogne–Liège in 1930. Buse was born in Berlin and died in Berlin, killed in action during World War II.

== Palmarès ==
1930
1st, Overall, Deutschland Tour
1st, Liège–Bastogne–Liège
1931
1st, Stage 8, Deutschland Tour, Liegnit
1937
3rd National Road Championships
