= Ernest Mottard =

Belgian cyclist

- Mottard in 1931

Personal information
- Born: 22 March 1902 Hollogne-aux-Pierres, Belgium
- Died: 30 December 1949 (aged 47) Hollogne-aux-Pierres, Belgium

Cycling career
- Sport: Cycling
- Role: Rider

Ernest Mottard (22 March 1902 – 30 December 1949) was a Belgian racing cyclist. He won the 1928 edition of the Liège–Bastogne–Liège.
