= Camille Danguillaume =

French cyclist (1919–1950)

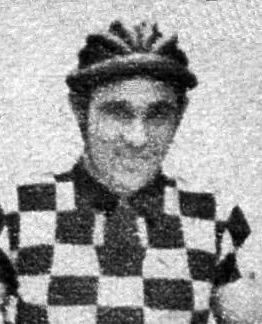
- Camille Danguillaume in 1943

Personal information
- Born: 4 June 1919 Châteaulin, France
- Died: 26 June 1950 (aged 31) Arpajon, France

Cycling career
- Sport: Cycling
- Discipline: Road
- Role: Rider

Professional team
- 1942–1950: Peugeot–Dunlop

Camille Danguillaume (4 June 1919 – 26 June 1950) was a French cyclist. He won Liège–Bastogne–Liège in 1949. He rode in the 1947, 1948 and 1949 Tour de France. He died of a fracture to the temporal bone four days after colliding with two motorcycles at the 1950 French National Road Championships at Montlhéry. He was the uncle of fellow racing cyclist Jean-Pierre Danguillaume.
