= Richard Depoorter =

Belgian cyclist

- Depoorter with Super

Personal information
- Born: 29 April 1915 Ichtegem, Belgium
- Died: 16 June 1948 (aged 33) Wassen, Switzerland

Cycling career
- Sport: Cycling
- Role: Rider

Richard Depoorter (29 April 1915 – 16 June 1948) was a Belgian racing cyclist. He won the 1943 and 1947 editions of the Liège–Bastogne–Liège. He crashed into a tunnel wall on a "descent of the Sustenpas near Bern" during the 1948 Tour of Switzerland and died onsite or shortly thereafter due to his injuries.

== See also ==
- List of professional cyclists who died during a race
