= Marcel Houyoux =

Belgian cyclist

Personal information
- Born: 2 May 1903 Bouffioulx, Belgium
- Died: 28 November 1983 (aged 80) Charleroi, Belgium

Cycling career
- Sport: Cycling
- Role: Rider

Marcel Houyoux (2 May 1903 – 28 November 1983) was a Belgian racing cyclist. He won the 1932 edition of the Liège–Bastogne–Liège.
