= Maurice Raes =

Belgian cyclist

Personal information
- Born: 17 January 1907 Heusden, Belgium
- Died: 23 February 1992 (aged 85) Gentbrugge, Belgium

Cycling career
- Sport: Cycling
- Role: Rider

Maurice Raes (17 January 1907 – 23 February 1992) was a Belgian racing cyclist. He won the 1927 edition of the Liège–Bastogne–Liège.
