= François Gardier =

Belgian cyclist

Personal information
- Born: 27 March 1903 Ayeneux, Belgium
- Died: 15 February 1971 (aged 67) Seraing, Belgium

Cycling career
- Sport: Cycling
- Role: Rider

François Gardier (27 March 1903 – 15 February 1971) was a Belgian racing cyclist. He won the 1933 edition of the Liège–Bastogne–Liège.
