= List of teams and cyclists in the 1926 Tour de France =

List of cyclists

There were 126 cyclists who started the 1926 Tour de France; 82 of them were touriste-routiers, cyclists who did not have the support from a team. The other 44 cyclists started the race in teams; some teams only had two cyclists. The two teams with favourites were Automoto and Alcyon. The Automoto team had Ottavio Bottecchia, the winner of the last two editions of the race, and Lucien Buysse, the runner-up of the previous edition. The Alcyon team had Bartolomeo Aymo and Nicolas Frantz, third and fourth in 1925. They also had Adelin Benoit, and the Tour organisation thought that the battle would be between Bottecchia and Benoit.

== Cyclists ==
=== By starting number ===
Legend
No.	Starting number worn by the rider during the Tour
Pos.	Position in the general classification
DNF	Denotes a rider who did not finish

No.	Name	Nationality	Team	Pos.	Ref
1	Ottavio Bottecchia	Italy	Automoto-Hutchinson	DNF	
2	Lucien Buysse	Belgium	Automoto-Hutchinson	1	
3	Jules Buysse	Belgium	Automoto-Hutchinson	9	
4	Samuel Tequi	France	Automoto-Hutchinson	DNF	
5	Omer Huyse	Belgium	Automoto-Hutchinson	13	
6	Joseph Van Dam	Belgium	Automoto-Hutchinson	12	
7	Emile Hardy	Belgium	Christophe-Hutchinson	16	
8	Alfonso Piccin	Italy	Christophe-Hutchinson	DNF	
9	Aimé Dossche	Belgium	Christophe-Hutchinson	15	
10	Joseph Pe	Belgium	Jean Louvet-Hutchinson	DNF	
11	Henri Collé	Switzerland	Jean Louvet-Hutchinson	18	
12	Léon Parmentier	Belgium	Jean Louvet-Hutchinson	7	
13	Albert Dejonghe	Belgium	JB Louvet-Wolber	6	
14	Camille Van De Casteele	Belgium	JB Louvet-Wolber	14	
15	Gustaaf Van Slembrouck	Belgium	JB Louvet-Wolber	DNF	
16	Henri Pélissier	France	JB Louvet-Wolber	DNF	
17	Romain Bellenger	France	JB Louvet-Wolber	DNF	
18	Arsène Alancourt	France	JB Louvet-Wolber	DNF	
19	Odile Tailleu	Belgium	JB Louvet-Wolber	11	
20	Raymond Decorte	Belgium	JB Louvet-Wolber	DNF	
21	Nicolas Frantz	Luxembourg	Alcyon-Dunlop	2	
22	Bartolomeo Aimo	Italy	Alcyon-Dunlop	3	
23	Jean De Busschere	Belgium	Alcyon-Dunlop	DNF	
24	Félix Sellier	Belgium	Alcyon-Dunlop	5	
25	Adelin Benoît	Belgium	Alcyon-Dunlop	DNF	
26	Raymond Englebert	Belgium	Alcyon-Dunlop	17	
27	Théophile Beeckman	Belgium	Armor-Dunlop	4	
28	Alfons Standaert	Belgium	Armor-Dunlop	22	
29	Jan Mertens	Belgium	Labor-Dunlop	26	
30	Louis De Lannoy	Belgium	Labor-Dunlop	28	
31	Marcel Bidot	France	Thomann-Dunlop	10	
32	Léon Devos	Belgium	Thomann-Dunlop	25	
33	Georges Cuvelier	France	Météore-Wolber	8	
34	Georges Detreille	France	Météore-Wolber	19	
35	Secondo Martinetto	Italy	Météore-Wolber	DNF	
36	Benoît Faure	France	Météore-Wolber	23	
37	Marcel Gobillot	France	Météore-Wolber	DNF	
38	Marcel Huot	France	Météore-Wolber	DNF	
39	Fernand Saivé	Belgium	Météore-Wolber	32	
40	Fernand Moulet	France	Météore-Wolber	36	
41	Omer Vermeulen	Belgium	Météore-Wolber	20	
42	André Casterman	Belgium	Météore-Wolber	DNF	
43	Henri Dejaeghere	Belgium	Météore-Wolber	DNF	
44	Albert Flahaut	France	Météore-Wolber	DNF	
101	Charles Parel	Switzerland	Touriste-routier	DNF	
102	Alexandre Bontoux	France	Touriste-routier	DNF	
103	Battista Recrosio	Italy	Touriste-routier	DNF	
108	Léopold Gelot	France	Touriste-routier	DNF	
109	Fernand Besnier	France	Touriste-routier	DNF	
112	Jules Gillard	Switzerland	Touriste-routier	40	
113	Henri Tesi	France	Touriste-routier	DNF	
119	André Drobecq	France	Touriste-routier	41	
120	Oscar Barselotti	Italy	Touriste-routier	DNF	
121	Albert Vigna	Monaco	Touriste-routier	DNF	
122	Germain Bezille	France	Touriste-routier	DNF	
125	Robert Beaulieu	France	Touriste-routier	DNF	
127	Maxime Mourguiat	France	Touriste-routier	DNF	
129	Baptiste Mousset	France	Touriste-routier	DNF	
130	Paul Coppens	France	Touriste-routier	DNF	
131	Henri Ferrara	France	Touriste-routier	39	
132	Alfred Francini	Italy	Touriste-routier	37	
133	Giovanni Canova	Italy	Touriste-routier	DNF	
134	Louis Michelena	France	Touriste-routier	DNF	
135	Henri Beirnaert	Belgium	Touriste-routier	DNF	
136	Henri Hennequin	France	Touriste-routier	DNF	
137	Louis Millo	France	Touriste-routier	DNF	
138	Kisso Kawamuro	Japan	Touriste-routier	DNF	
139	Léon Jacacier	France	Touriste-routier	DNF	
140	Clovis Cros	France	Touriste-routier	DNF	
141	Battista Ghiano	Italy	Touriste-routier	DNF	
142	Louis Gauthier	France	Touriste-routier	DNF	
143	Émile Brichard	Belgium	Touriste-routier	DNF	
144	Mario Della-Fina	Italy	Touriste-routier	DNF	
145	Charles Martinet	Switzerland	Touriste-routier	31	
146	Felix Richard	France	Touriste-routier	DNF	
147	Ermest Gillioli	France	Touriste-routier	DNF	
151	Adrien Toussaint	France	Touriste-routier	DNF	
152	Carlo Longoni	Italy	Touriste-routier	30	
153	Maurice Arnoult	France	Touriste-routier	33	
154	Henri Touzard	France	Touriste-routier	24	
155	Luigi Vertemati	Italy	Touriste-routier	DNF	
156	Norbert Larose	France	Touriste-routier	DNF	
157	François Chevalier	France	Touriste-routier	DNF	
158	Paul Filliat	France	Touriste-routier	DNF	
159	Adrien Alpini	France	Touriste-routier	DNF	
160	Robert Asse	France	Touriste-routier	DNF	
161	François Faillu	France	Touriste-routier	DNF	
162	Edouard Teisseire	France	Touriste-routier	38	
163	Eugène Dhers	France	Touriste-routier	29	
164	Arthur Hendryckx	Belgium	Touriste-routier	DNF	
165	Rodolfo Betta	Italy	Touriste-routier	DNF	
166	François Liverani	Italy	Touriste-routier	DNF	
167	Pierre Bristo	France	Touriste-routier	DNF	
168	Alfred Louchet	France	Touriste-routier	DNF	
169	Gino Bartolucci	Italy	Touriste-routier	DNF	
171	Ricardo Benasseni	Italy	Touriste-routier	DNF	
172	Giovanni Rossignoli	Italy	Touriste-routier	21	
174	Adrien Fraisse	France	Touriste-routier	DNF	
175	Maurice Vayssiere	France	Touriste-routier	DNF	
176	Emanuele Luigi	Italy	Touriste-routier	DNF	
177	Henri Faivre	France	Touriste-routier	DNF	
178	Henri Catelan	France	Touriste-routier	34	
179	Raphaël Dupau	France	Touriste-routier	DNF	
181	Edouard Petre	France	Touriste-routier	DNF	
182	Joseph Le Boubennec	France	Touriste-routier	DNF	
183	Jacques Pfister	France	Touriste-routier	DNF	
184	François Brient	France	Touriste-routier	DNF	
186	Pierre Corini	Italy	Touriste-routier	DNF	
187	Eugène Chiaberge	France	Touriste-routier	DNF	
189	Primo Gaida	Switzerland	Touriste-routier	DNF	
190	André Peton	France	Touriste-routier	DNF	
191	Luigi Cecili	Italy	Touriste-routier	DNF	
192	Paul Duboc	France	Touriste-routier	27	
193	Jean-Roger Schwenter	France	Touriste-routier	DNF	
194	Jules Deloffre	France	Touriste-routier	DNF	
195	Julien Drougard	France	Touriste-routier	DNF	
196	Tulio Rangis	Italy	Touriste-routier	DNF	
197	Yvon Pascoli	Italy	Touriste-routier	DNF	
198	Joseph Rayen	France	Touriste-routier	DNF	
200	Camille Bière	France	Touriste-routier	DNF	
202	Mose Arrosio	Italy	Touriste-routier	35	
203	Gaston Coriol	France	Touriste-routier	DNF	
206	Giuseppe Brenna	Italy	Touriste-routier	DNF	
207	Piero Brumana	Italy	Touriste-routier	DNF	
216	Guy Bariffi	Switzerland	Touriste-routier	DNF	
217	Maurice Guenot	France	Touriste-routier	DNF	
