= 1926 Tour de France, Stage 1 to Stage 9 =

Cycling race stages

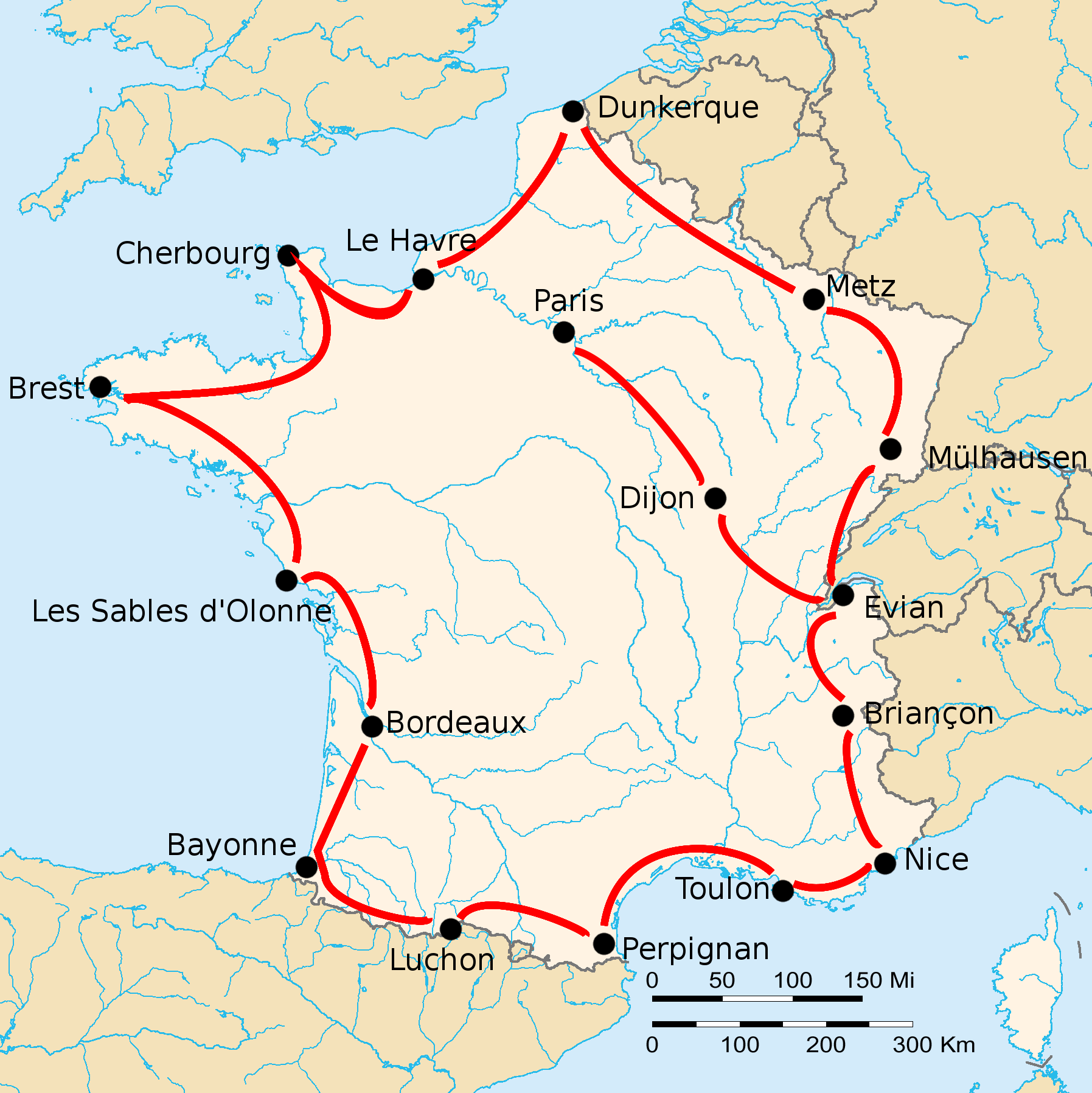
Route of the 1926 Tour de France

The 1926 Tour de France was the 20th edition of the Tour de France, one of cycling's Grand Tours. The Tour began in Evian with a flat stage on 20 June, and Stage 9 occurred on 4 July with a flat stage to Bayonne. The race finished in Paris on 18 July.

== Stage 1 ==
20 June 1926 - Evian to Mülhausen, 373 km (232 mi)

Stage 1 result and general classification after stage 1

Rank	Rider	Team	Time
1	Jules Buysse (BEL)	Automoto-Hutchinson	14h 12' 04"
2	Camille Van De Casteele (BEL)	JB Louvet-Wolber	+ 13' 06"
3	Léon Parmentier (BEL)	Jean Louvet-Hutchinson	s.t.
4	Jean Debusschere (BEL)	Alcyon-Dunlop	s.t.
5	Georges Cuvelier (FRA)	Météore-Wolber	s.t.
6	Adelin Benoît (BEL)	Alcyon-Dunlop	s.t.
7	André Casterman (BEL)	Météore-Wolber	s.t.
8	Odile Tailleu (BEL)	JB Louvet-Wolber	s.t.
9	Benoît Faure (FRA)	Météore-Wolber	s.t.
10	Gustaaf Van Slembrouck (BEL)	JB Louvet-Wolber	s.t.

== Stage 2 ==
22 June 1926 - Mülhausen to Metz, 334 km (208 mi)

Stage 2 result

Rank	Rider	Team	Time
1	Aimé Dossche (BEL)	Christophe-Hutchinson	13h 29' 16"
2	Félix Sellier (BEL)	Alcyon-Dunlop	s.t.
3	Joseph Van Dam (BEL)	Automoto-Hutchinson	s.t.
4	Adelin Benoît (BEL)	Alcyon-Dunlop	s.t.
5	Georges Cuvelier (FRA)	Météore-Wolber	s.t.
=6	Lucien Buysse (BEL)	Automoto-Hutchinson	s.t.
=6	Jules Buysse (BEL)	Automoto-Hutchinson	s.t.
=6	Simon Tequi (FRA)	Automoto-Hutchinson	s.t.
=6	Henri Collé (SUI)	Jean Louvet-Hutchinson	s.t.
=6	Léon Parmentier (BEL)	Jean Louvet-Hutchinson	s.t.

General classification after stage 2

Rank	Rider	Team	Time
1	Jules Buysse (BEL)	Automoto-Hutchinson	
2	Camille Van De Casteele (BEL)	JB Louvet-Wolber	+ 13' 06"
3	Léon Parmentier (BEL)	Jean Louvet-Hutchinson	s.t.
4			
5			
6			
7			
8			
9			
10			

== Stage 3 ==
24 June 1926 - Metz to Dunkerque, 433 km (269 mi)

Stage 3 result

Rank	Rider	Team	Time
1	Gustaaf Van Slembrouck (BEL)	JB Louvet-Wolber	17h 11' 14"
2	Albert Dejonghe (BEL)	JB Louvet-Wolber	s.t.
3	Adelin Benoît (BEL)	Alcyon-Dunlop	+ 10' 45"
4	Georges Cuvelier (FRA)	Météore-Wolber	s.t.
5	Théophile Beeckman (BEL)	Armor-Dunlop	s.t.
6	Odile Tailleu (BEL)	JB Louvet-Wolber	s.t.
7	Bartolomeo Aimo (ITA)	Alcyon-Dunlop	s.t.
8	Camille Van De Casteele (BEL)	JB Louvet-Wolber	+ 12' 22"
9	Nicolas Frantz (LUX)	Alcyon-Dunlop	s.t.
10	Léon Devos (BEL)	Thomann-Dunlop	s.t.

General classification after stage 3

Rank	Rider	Team	Time
1	Gustaaf Van Slembrouck (BEL)	JB Louvet-Wolber	
2	Albert Dejonghe (BEL)	JB Louvet-Wolber	+ 1' 09"
3	Jules Buysse (BEL)	Automoto-Hutchinson	+ 6' 27"
4			
5			
6			
7			
8			
9			
10			

== Stage 4 ==
26 June 1926 - Dunkerque to Le Havre, 361 km (224 mi)

Stage 4 result

Rank	Rider	Team	Time
1	Félix Sellier (BEL)	Alcyon-Dunlop	14h 57' 01"
2	Nicolas Frantz (LUX)	Alcyon-Dunlop	s.t.
3	Camille Van De Casteele (BEL)	JB Louvet-Wolber	s.t.
4	Joseph Van Dam (BEL)	Automoto-Hutchinson	s.t.
5	Alfonso Piccin (ITA)	Christophe-Hutchinson	s.t.
=6	Ottavio Bottecchia (ITA)	Automoto-Hutchinson	s.t.
=6	Lucien Buysse (BEL)	Automoto-Hutchinson	s.t.
=6	Jules Buysse (BEL)	Automoto-Hutchinson	s.t.
=6	Omer Huyse (BEL)	Automoto-Hutchinson	s.t.
=6	Joseph Pe (BEL)	Jean Louvet-Hutchinson	s.t.

General classification after stage 4

Rank	Rider	Team	Time
1	Gustaaf Van Slembrouck (BEL)	JB Louvet-Wolber	
2	Albert Dejonghe (BEL)	JB Louvet-Wolber	+ 1' 09"
3	Jules Buysse (BEL)	Automoto-Hutchinson	+ 6' 17"
4			
5			
6			
7			
8			
9			
10			

== Stage 5 ==
28 June 1926 - Le Havre to Cherbourg-en-Cotentin, 357 km (222 mi)

Stage 5 result

Rank	Rider	Team	Time
1	Adelin Benoît (BEL)	Alcyon-Dunlop	14h 14' 09"
2	Romain Bellenger (FRA)	JB Louvet-Wolber	s.t.
3	Joseph Van Dam (BEL)	Automoto-Hutchinson	s.t.
4	Camille Van De Casteele (BEL)	JB Louvet-Wolber	s.t.
5	Marcel Bidot (FRA)	Thomann-Dunlop	s.t.
6	Gustaaf Van Slembrouck (BEL)	JB Louvet-Wolber	s.t.
7	Joseph Pe (BEL)	Jean Louvet-Hutchinson	s.t.
8	Albert Dejonghe (BEL)	JB Louvet-Wolber	s.t.
9	Georges Cuvelier (FRA)	Météore-Wolber	s.t.
10	Ottavio Bottecchia (ITA)	Automoto-Hutchinson	s.t.

General classification after stage 5

Rank	Rider	Team	Time
1	Gustaaf Van Slembrouck (BEL)	JB Louvet-Wolber	
2	Albert Dejonghe (BEL)	JB Louvet-Wolber	+ 1' 09"
3	Jules Buysse (BEL)	Automoto-Hutchinson	+ 6' 17"
4			
5			
6			
7			
8			
9			
10			

== Stage 6 ==
30 June 1926 - Cherbourg-en-Cotentin to Brest, 405 km (252 mi)

Stage 6 result

Rank	Rider	Team	Time
1	Joseph Van Dam (BEL)	Automoto-Hutchinson	16h 12' 49"
2	Félix Sellier (BEL)	Alcyon-Dunlop	s.t.
3	Aimé Dossche (BEL)	Christophe-Hutchinson	s.t.
4	Romain Bellenger (FRA)	JB Louvet-Wolber	s.t.
5	Raymond Decorte (BEL)	JB Louvet-Wolber	s.t.
6	Marcel Bidot (FRA)	Thomann-Dunlop	s.t.
7	Ottavio Bottecchia (ITA)	Automoto-Hutchinson	s.t.
8	Gustaaf Van Slembrouck (BEL)	JB Louvet-Wolber	s.t.
=9	Benoît Faure (FRA)	Météore-Wolber	s.t.
=9	Léon Parmentier (BEL)	Jean Louvet-Hutchinson	s.t.

General classification after stage 6

Rank	Rider	Team	Time
1	Gustaaf Van Slembrouck (BEL)	JB Louvet-Wolber	
2	Albert Dejonghe (BEL)	JB Louvet-Wolber	+ 1' 09"
3	Jules Buysse (BEL)	Automoto-Hutchinson	+ 6' 17"
4			
5			
6			
7			
8			
9			
10			

== Stage 7 ==
2 July 1926 - Brest to Les Sables d'Olonne, 412 km (256 mi)

Stage 7 result

Rank	Rider	Team	Time
1	Nicolas Frantz (LUX)	Alcyon-Dunlop	16h 20' 54"
2	Adelin Benoît (BEL)	Alcyon-Dunlop	s.t.
3	Aimé Dossche (BEL)	Christophe-Hutchinson	s.t.
4	Marcel Bidot (FRA)	Thomann-Dunlop	s.t.
5	Romain Bellenger (FRA)	JB Louvet-Wolber	s.t.
=6	Ottavio Bottecchia (ITA)	Automoto-Hutchinson	s.t.
=6	Lucien Buysse (BEL)	Automoto-Hutchinson	s.t.
=6	Jules Buysse (BEL)	Automoto-Hutchinson	s.t.
=6	Omer Huyse (BEL)	Automoto-Hutchinson	s.t.
=6	Félix Sellier (BEL)	Alcyon-Dunlop	s.t.

General classification after stage 7

Rank	Rider	Team	Time
1	Gustaaf Van Slembrouck (BEL)	JB Louvet-Wolber	
2	Albert Dejonghe (BEL)	JB Louvet-Wolber	+ 1' 09"
3	Jules Buysse (BEL)	Automoto-Hutchinson	+ 6' 17"
4			
5			
6			
7			
8			
9			
10			

== Stage 8 ==
3 July 1926 - Les Sables d'Olonne to Bordeaux, 285 km (177 mi)

Stage 8 result

Rank	Rider	Team	Time
1	Joseph Van Dam (BEL)	Automoto-Hutchinson	12h 00' 08"
2	Nicolas Frantz (LUX)	Alcyon-Dunlop	s.t.
3	Félix Sellier (BEL)	Alcyon-Dunlop	s.t.
4	Emile Hardy (BEL)	Christophe-Hutchinson	s.t.
5	Camille Van De Casteele (BEL)	JB Louvet-Wolber	s.t.
=6	Ottavio Bottecchia (ITA)	Automoto-Hutchinson	s.t.
=6	Lucien Buysse (BEL)	Automoto-Hutchinson	s.t.
=6	Jules Buysse (BEL)	Automoto-Hutchinson	s.t.
=6	Omer Huyse (BEL)	Automoto-Hutchinson	s.t.
=6	Aimé Dossche (BEL)	Christophe-Hutchinson	s.t.

General classification after stage 8

Rank	Rider	Team	Time
1	Gustaaf Van Slembrouck (BEL)	JB Louvet-Wolber	
2	Albert Dejonghe (BEL)	JB Louvet-Wolber	+ 1' 09"
3	Jules Buysse (BEL)	Automoto-Hutchinson	+ 6' 17"
4			
5			
6			
7			
8			
9			
10			

== Stage 9 ==
4 July 1926 - Bordeaux to Bayonne, 189 km (117 mi)

Stage 9 result

Rank	Rider	Team	Time
1	Nicolas Frantz (LUX)	Alcyon-Dunlop	7h 38' 19"
2	Joseph Van Dam (BEL)	Automoto-Hutchinson	s.t.
3	Félix Sellier (BEL)	Alcyon-Dunlop	s.t.
4	Raymond Decorte (BEL)	JB Louvet-Wolber	s.t.
5	Jan Mertens (BEL)	Labor-Dunlop	s.t.
6	Henri Tesi (FRA)	Touriste-routier	s.t.
7	Louis De Lannoy (BEL)	Labor-Dunlop	s.t.
=8	Ottavio Bottecchia (ITA)	Automoto-Hutchinson	s.t.
=8	Lucien Buysse (BEL)	Automoto-Hutchinson	s.t.
=8	Jules Buysse (BEL)	Automoto-Hutchinson	s.t.

General classification after stage 9

Rank	Rider	Team	Time
1	Gustaaf Van Slembrouck (BEL)	JB Louvet-Wolber	
2	Albert Dejonghe (BEL)	JB Louvet-Wolber	+ 1' 09"
3	Jules Buysse (BEL)	Automoto-Hutchinson	+ 6' 17"
4			
5			
6			
7			
8			
9			
10			
