= 1926 Tour de France, Stage 10 to Stage 17 =

Cycling race stages

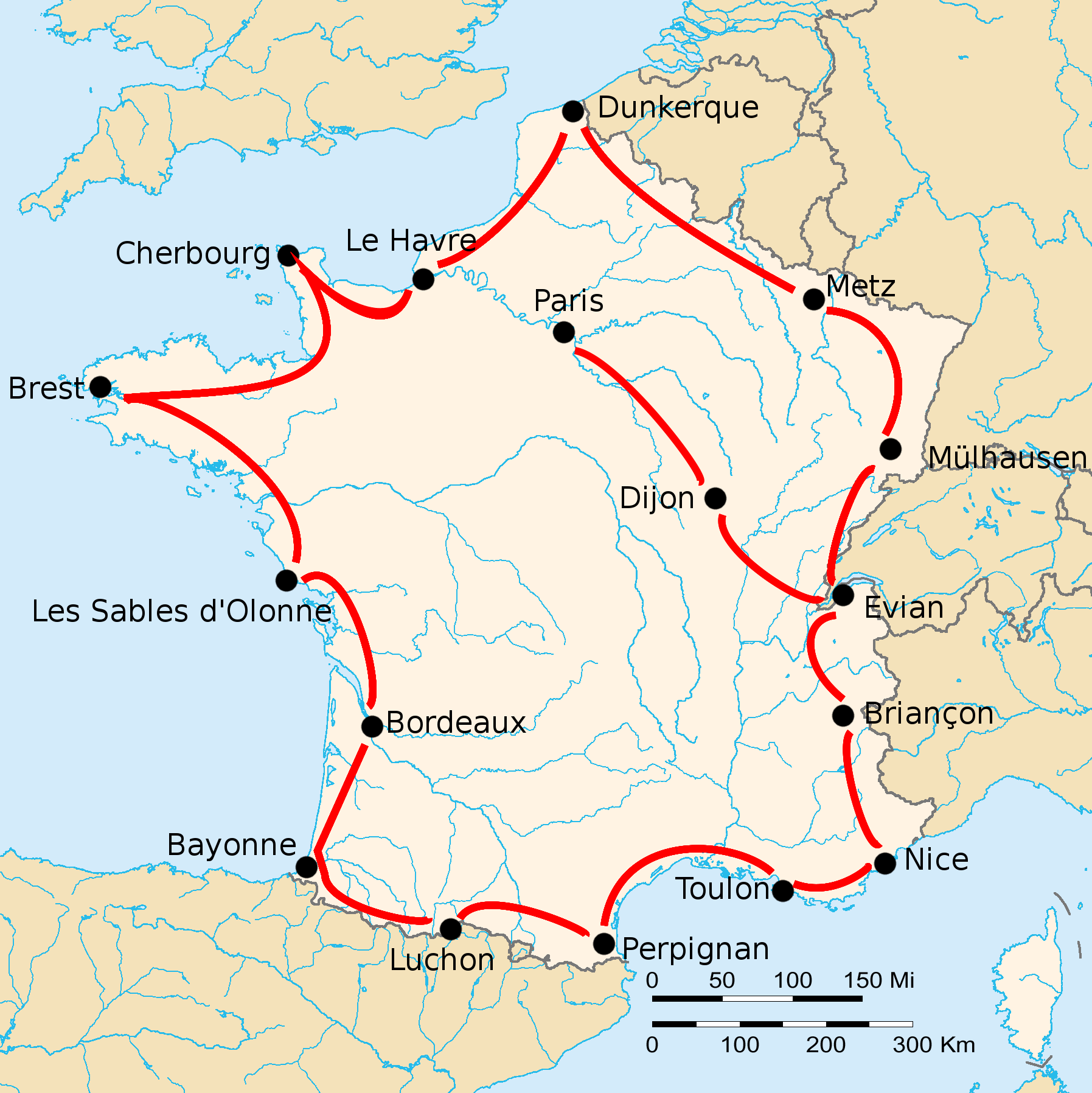
Route of the 1926 Tour de France

The 1926 Tour de France was the 20th edition of the Tour de France, one of cycling's Grand Tours. The Tour began in Evian on 20 June, and Stage 10 occurred on 6 July with a mountainous stage from Bayonne. The race finished in Paris on 18 July.

== Stage 10 ==
6 July 1926 - Bayonne to Luchon, 326 km (203 mi)

Stage 10 result

Rank	Rider	Team	Time
1	Lucien Buysse (BEL)	Automoto-Hutchinson	17h 12' 04"
2	Bartolomeo Aimo (ITA)	Alcyon-Dunlop	+ 25' 48"
3	Léon Devos (BEL)	Thomann-Dunlop	+ 29' 49"
4	Théophile Beeckman (BEL)	Armor-Dunlop	+ 40' 00"
5	Nicolas Frantz (LUX)	Alcyon-Dunlop	+ 42' 19"
6	Léon Parmentier (BEL)	Jean Louvet-Hutchinson	+ 46' 45"
7	Félix Sellier (BEL)	Alcyon-Dunlop	+ 47' 42"
8	Odile Tailleu (BEL)	JB Louvet-Wolber	+ 48' 19"
9	Raymond Englebert (BEL)	Alcyon-Dunlop	+ 51' 42"
10	Jan Mertens (BEL)	Labor-Dunlop	+ 53' 32"

General classification after stage 10

Rank	Rider	Team	Time
1	Lucien Buysse (BEL)	Automoto-Hutchinson	
2	Odile Tailleu (BEL)	JB Louvet-Wolber	+ 36' 14"
3	Albert Dejonghe (BEL)	JB Louvet-Wolber	+ 46' 50"
4			
5			
6			
7			
8			
9			
10			

== Stage 11 ==
8 July 1926 - Luchon to Perpignan, 323 km (201 mi)

Stage 11 result

Rank	Rider	Team	Time
1	Lucien Buysse (BEL)	Automoto-Hutchinson	12h 31' 16"
2	Jules Buysse (BEL)	Automoto-Hutchinson	+ 7' 16"
3	Jan Mertens (BEL)	Labor-Dunlop	+ 16' 50"
4	Nicolas Frantz (LUX)	Alcyon-Dunlop	+ 17' 51"
5	Camille Van De Casteele (BEL)	JB Louvet-Wolber	s.t.
6	Romain Bellenger (FRA)	JB Louvet-Wolber	s.t.
7	Albert Dejonghe (BEL)	JB Louvet-Wolber	s.t.
8	Emile Hardy (BEL)	Christophe-Hutchinson	+ 23' 52"
9	Léon Parmentier (BEL)	Jean Louvet-Hutchinson	s.t.
10	Benoît Faure (FRA)	Météore-Wolber	+ 27' 32"

General classification after stage 11

Rank	Rider	Team	Time
1	Lucien Buysse (BEL)	Automoto-Hutchinson	
2	Albert Dejonghe (BEL)	JB Louvet-Wolber	+ 1h 04' 41"
3	Odile Tailleu (BEL)	JB Louvet-Wolber	+ 1h 13' 32"
4			
5			
6			
7			
8			
9			
10			

== Stage 12 ==
10 July 1926 - Perpignan to Toulon, 427 km (265 mi)

Stage 12 result

Rank	Rider	Team	Time
1	Nicolas Frantz (LUX)	Alcyon-Dunlop	17h 32' 32"
2	Félix Sellier (BEL)	Alcyon-Dunlop	s.t.
3	Georges Cuvelier (FRA)	Météore-Wolber	s.t.
4	Marcel Bidot (FRA)	Thomann-Dunlop	s.t.
5	Bartolomeo Aimo (ITA)	Alcyon-Dunlop	+ 13"
6	Lucien Buysse (BEL)	Automoto-Hutchinson	+ 2' 36"
7	Omer Huyse (BEL)	Automoto-Hutchinson	s.t.
8	Joseph Van Dam (BEL)	Automoto-Hutchinson	+ 7' 08"
9	Odile Tailleu (BEL)	JB Louvet-Wolber	+ 9' 19"
10	Benoît Faure (FRA)	Météore-Wolber	+ 14' 15"

General classification after stage 12

Rank	Rider	Team	Time
1	Lucien Buysse (BEL)	Automoto-Hutchinson	
2	Odile Tailleu (BEL)	JB Louvet-Wolber	+ 1h 20' 15"
3	Albert Dejonghe (BEL)	JB Louvet-Wolber	+ 1h 20' 53"
4			
5			
6			
7			
8			
9			
10			

== Stage 13 ==
12 July 1926 - Toulon to Nice, 280 km (170 mi)

Stage 13 result

Rank	Rider	Team	Time
1	Nicolas Frantz (LUX)	Alcyon-Dunlop	11h 31' 10"
2	Marcel Bidot (FRA)	Thomann-Dunlop	s.t.
3	Théophile Beeckman (BEL)	Armor-Dunlop	+ 4' 20"
4	Lucien Buysse (BEL)	Automoto-Hutchinson	s.t.
5	Omer Huyse (BEL)	Automoto-Hutchinson	+ 8' 18"
6	Jan Mertens (BEL)	Labor-Dunlop	+ 11' 09"
7	Bartolomeo Aimo (ITA)	Alcyon-Dunlop	s.t.
8	Félix Sellier (BEL)	Alcyon-Dunlop	+ 12' 32"
9	Joseph Van Dam (BEL)	Automoto-Hutchinson	s.t.
10	Georges Cuvelier (FRA)	Météore-Wolber	s.t.

General classification after stage 13

Rank	Rider	Team	Time
1	Lucien Buysse (BEL)	Automoto-Hutchinson	
2	Nicolas Frantz (LUX)	Alcyon-Dunlop	+ 1h 19' 37"
3	Georges Cuvelier (FRA)	Météore-Wolber	+ 1h 33' 07"
4			
5			
6			
7			
8			
9			
10			

== Stage 14 ==
14 July 1926 - Nice to Briançon, 275 km (171 mi)

Stage 14 result

Rank	Rider	Team	Time
1	Bartolomeo Aimo (ITA)	Alcyon-Dunlop	11h 59' 55"
2	Félix Sellier (BEL)	Alcyon-Dunlop	+ 6' 38"
3	Marcel Bidot (FRA)	Thomann-Dunlop	+ 13' 05"
4	Jules Buysse (BEL)	Automoto-Hutchinson	+ 17' 13"
5	Léon Parmentier (BEL)	Jean Louvet-Hutchinson	+ 20' 43"
6	Emile Hardy (BEL)	Christophe-Hutchinson	+ 22' 22"
7	Théophile Beeckman (BEL)	Armor-Dunlop	s.t.
8	Omer Huyse (BEL)	Automoto-Hutchinson	+ 27' 02"
9	Lucien Buysse (BEL)	Automoto-Hutchinson	s.t.
10	Nicolas Frantz (LUX)	Alcyon-Dunlop	s.t.

General classification after stage 14

Rank	Rider	Team	Time
1	Lucien Buysse (BEL)	Automoto-Hutchinson	
2	Nicolas Frantz (LUX)	Alcyon-Dunlop	+ 1h 19' 37"
3	Bartolomeo Aimo (ITA)	Alcyon-Dunlop	+ 1h 22' 51"
4			
5			
6			
7			
8			
9			
10			

== Stage 15 ==
16 July 1926 - Briançon to Evian, 303 km (188 mi)

Stage 15 result

Rank	Rider	Team	Time
1	Joseph Van Dam (BEL)	Automoto-Hutchinson	12h 09' 08"
2	Camille Van De Casteele (BEL)	JB Louvet-Wolber	s.t.
3	Georges Cuvelier (FRA)	Météore-Wolber	s.t.
4	Emile Hardy (BEL)	Christophe-Hutchinson	s.t.
5	Aimé Dossche (BEL)	Christophe-Hutchinson	s.t.
=6	Lucien Buysse (BEL)	Automoto-Hutchinson	s.t.
=6	Jules Buysse (BEL)	Automoto-Hutchinson	s.t.
=6	Omer Huyse (BEL)	Automoto-Hutchinson	s.t.
=6	Henri Collé (SUI)	Jean Louvet-Hutchinson	s.t.
=6	Léon Parmentier (BEL)	Jean Louvet-Hutchinson	s.t.

General classification after stage 15

Rank	Rider	Team	Time
1	Lucien Buysse (BEL)	Automoto-Hutchinson	
2	Nicolas Frantz (LUX)	Alcyon-Dunlop	+ 1h 19' 37"
3	Bartolomeo Aimo (ITA)	Alcyon-Dunlop	+ 1h 22' 51"
4			
5			
6			
7			
8			
9			
10			

== Stage 16 ==
17 July 1926 - Evian to Dijon, 321 km (199 mi)

Stage 16 result

Rank	Rider	Team	Time
1	Camille Van De Casteele (BEL)	JB Louvet-Wolber	13h 45' 57"
2	Félix Sellier (BEL)	Alcyon-Dunlop	s.t.
3	Georges Cuvelier (FRA)	Météore-Wolber	s.t.
=4	Georges Detreille (FRA)	Météore-Wolber	s.t.
=4	Louis De Lannoy (BEL)	Labor-Dunlop	s.t.
=4	Paul Duboc (FRA)	Touriste-routier	s.t.
=4	Carlo Longoni (ITA)	Touriste-routier	s.t.
=4	Henri Touzard (FRA)	Touriste-routier	s.t.
=4	Lucien Buysse (BEL)	Automoto-Hutchinson	s.t.
=4	Raymond Englebert (BEL)	Alcyon-Dunlop	s.t.

General classification after stage 16

Rank	Rider	Team	Time
1	Lucien Buysse (BEL)	Automoto-Hutchinson	
2	Nicolas Frantz (LUX)	Alcyon-Dunlop	+ 1h 19' 37"
3	Bartolomeo Aimo (ITA)	Alcyon-Dunlop	+ 1h 22' 51"
4			
5			
6			
7			
8			
9			
10			

== Stage 17 ==
18 July 1926 - Dijon to Paris, 341 km (212 mi)

Stage 17 result

Rank	Rider	Team	Time
1	Aimé Dossche (BEL)	Christophe-Hutchinson	14h 56' 05"
2	Félix Sellier (BEL)	Alcyon-Dunlop	s.t.
3	Marcel Bidot (FRA)	Thomann-Dunlop	s.t.
4	Léon Parmentier (BEL)	Jean Louvet-Hutchinson	s.t.
5	Lucien Buysse (BEL)	Automoto-Hutchinson	s.t.
6	Benoît Faure (FRA)	Météore-Wolber	s.t.
7	Bartolomeo Aimo (ITA)	Alcyon-Dunlop	s.t.
8	Jules Buysse (BEL)	Automoto-Hutchinson	s.t.
9	Henri Touzard (FRA)	Touriste-routier	s.t.
10	Albert Dejonghe (BEL)	JB Louvet-Wolber	s.t.

General classification after stage 17

Rank	Rider	Team	Time
1	Lucien Buysse (BEL)	Automoto-Hutchinson	238h 44' 25"
2	Nicolas Frantz (LUX)	Alcyon-Dunlop	+ 1h 22' 25"
3	Bartolomeo Aimo (ITA)	Alcyon-Dunlop	+ 1h 22' 51"
4	Théophile Beeckman (BEL)	Armor-Dunlop	+ 1h 43' 54"
5	Félix Sellier (BEL)	Alcyon-Dunlop	+ 1h 49' 13"
6	Albert Dejonghe (BEL)	JB Louvet-Wolber	+ 1h 56' 15"
7	Léon Parmentier (BEL)	Jean Louvet-Hutchinson	+ 2h 09' 20"
8	Georges Cuvelier (FRA)	Météore-Wolber	+ 2h 28' 32"
9	Jules Buysse (BEL)	Automoto-Hutchinson	+ 2h 37' 03"
10	Marcel Bidot (FRA)	Thomann-Dunlop	+ 2h 53' 54"
