= Buysse =

Buysse is a last name. It is shared by the following people:

- Achiel Buysse (1918–1984), Belgian cyclist
- Autumn Buysse (???), American musical singer and songwriter
- Bart Buysse (born 1986), Belgian association football player
- Cyriel Buysse (1859–1932), Flemish naturalist author and playwright
- Henri-Corentin Buysse (born 1988), French ice hockey player
- Jules Buysse (1901–1950), Belgian racing cyclist
- Kamiel Buysse (1932–2020), Belgian racing cyclist
- Lucien Buysse (1892–1980), Belgian cyclist
- Marcel Buysse (1889–1939), Belgian racing cyclist
- Paul Buysse (born 1945), Belgian businessman
- Yves Buysse (born 1968), Belgian politician
