= Casterman (surname) =

Casterman is a surname. Notable people with the surname include:

- André Casterman (1899–1975), Belgian racing cyclist
- Eddy Casterman (born 1996), French politician

== See also ==
- Casterman, Belgian publisher
