= 1923 Liège–Bastogne–Liège =

Race details
- Dates: 3 June 1923
- Stages: 1
- Distance: 218 km (135 mi)
- Winning time: 7h 25' 15"

Results
	Winner	René Vermandel (BEL)
	Second	Jean Rossius (BEL)
	Third	Félix Sellier (BEL)

The 1923 Liège–Bastogne–Liège was the 13th edition of the Liège–Bastogne–Liège cycle race and was held on 3 June 1923. The race started and finished in Liège. The race was won by René Vermandel.

== General classification ==
Final general classification

Rank	Rider	Time
1	René Vermandel (BEL)	7h 25' 15"
2	Jean Rossius (BEL)	+ 0"
3	Félix Sellier (BEL)	+ 0"
4	Laurent Seret (BEL)	+ 0"
5	Théophile Beeckman (BEL)	+ 0"
5	Georges Delcominette (BEL)	+ 0"
5	Léon Despontin (BEL)	+ 0"
5	Léon Devos (BEL)	+ 0"
5	Émile Masson (BEL)	+ 0"
5	Henri Moerenhout (BEL)	+ 0"
