= 1921 Tour of Flanders =

Race details
- Dates: 13 March 1921
- Stages: 1
- Distance: 262 km (162.8 mi)
- Winning time: 9h 56' 00"

Results
	Winner	René Vermandel (BEL)	
	Second	Jules Vanhevel (BEL)	(Bianchi–Dunlop)
	Third	Louis Budts (BEL)	

The 1921 Tour of Flanders was the fifth edition of the Tour of Flanders, a Belgian one-day classic road cycling race, held on 13 March 1921. Ninety cyclists started and thirty-two finished the race, which was won by René Vermandel. In second place was Jules Van Hevel, riding for Bianchi–Dunlop, and Louis Budts was third.

== General classification ==
Final general classification

Rank	Rider	Team	Time
1	René Vermandel (BEL)		9h 56' 00"
2	Jules Vanhevel (BEL)	Bianchi–Dunlop	s.t.
3	Louis Budts (BEL)		s.t.
4	Albert Dejonghe (BEL)		s.t.
5	Louis Mottiat (BEL)	Alcyon	s.t.
6	John Van Ruysseveldt (BEL)		s.t.
7	Oscar Voet (BEL)		+ 150 m (490 ft)
8	Arthur Claerhout (BEL)		+ 2' 30"
9	Adolphe Coppez (BEL)		+ 5' 30"
10	Jules Masselis (BEL)		+ 9' 25"
