= 1924 Liège–Bastogne–Liège =

Race details
- Dates: 10 August 1924
- Stages: 1
- Distance: 245 km (152 mi)
- Winning time: 8h 14' 00"

Results
| | Winner | René Vermandel (BEL) |
| | Second | Adelin Benoît (BEL) |
| | Third | Jules Matton (BEL) |

The 1924 Liège–Bastogne–Liège was the 14th edition of the Liège–Bastogne–Liège cycle race and was held on 10 August 1924. The race started and finished in Liège. The race was won by René Vermandel.

== General classification ==
Final general classification

| Rank | Rider | Time |
|---|---|---|
| 1 | René Vermandel (BEL) | 8h 14' 00" |
| 2 | Adelin Benoît (BEL) | + 0" |
| 3 | Jules Matton (BEL) | + 0" |
| 4 | Albert Bolly (BEL) | + 0" |
| 5 | Denis Verschueren (BEL) | + 0" |
| 6 | Maurice De Waele (BEL) | + 0" |
| 7 | Félix Sellier (BEL) | + 0" |
| 8 | Léon Devos (BEL) | + 0" |
| 9 | Emile Masson (BEL) | + 0" |
| 10 | Léon Luites (BEL) | + 0" |
