= Vigna (surname) =

Vigna is an Italian surname. Notable people with the surname include:

- Albert Vigna (1891–1970), Monegasque racing cyclist
- Arturo Vigna (1863–1927), Italian opera conductor
- Benedetto Vigna (born 1969), Italian physicist and business executive
- Elvira Vigna (1947–2017), Brazilian writer, illustrator, and journalist
- Hernán Vigna (born 1977), former Argentine footballer
- Giovanni Vigna (born c. 1925), Italian rugby league footballer who played in the 1950s and 1960s
- Judith Vigna (1936–2019), English writer and painter
- Laura Vigna (born 1999), Italian softball player
- Marino Vigna (born 1938), retired Italian cyclist
- Pierluigi Vigna (1933–2012), Italian judge
- Sebastiano Vigna (born 1967), Italian professor of computer science
- Tecla Vigna (died 1927), Italian opera singer
