= 1920 Paris–Roubaix =

Cycling race

Race details
- Dates: 4 April 1920
- Stages: 1
- Distance: 280 km (174.0 mi)
- Winning time: 10h 47' 20"

Results
	Winner	Paul Deman (BEL)
	Second	Eugène Christophe (FRA)
	Third	Lucien Buysse (BEL)

The 1920 Paris–Roubaix was the 21st edition of the Paris–Roubaix, a classic one-day cycle race in France. The single day event was held on 4 April 1920 and stretched 280 km (174 mi) from Paris to its end in a velodrome in Roubaix. The winner was the Belgian Paul Deman.

== Results ==
Final results (1–10)
Rank	Cyclist	Time
1	Paul Deman (BEL)	10h 47' 20″
2	Eugène Christophe (FRA)	+0' 43″
3	Lucien Buysse (BEL)	+0' 43″
4	Honoré Barthélémy (FRA)	+1' 00″
5	Jules Van Hevel (BEL)	+6' 23″
6	Henri Pélissier (FRA)	+7' 26″
7	Robert Gerbaud (FRA)	+7' 26″
8	Giuseppe Azzini (ITA)	+15' 40″
9	Félix Goethals (FRA)	+16' 40″
10	Marcel Buysse (BEL)	+27' 42″
