= Brumana =

Brumana is a surname. Notable people with the surname include:

- Herminia Brumana (1897 – 1954), Argentine teacher, writer, journalist, playwright and feminist activist with socialist and anarchist ideas
- Paola Brumana (born 1982), Italian former football striker
- Piero Brumana (1901 – 1975), Italian racing cyclist

== See also ==
- Bruma
- Brumana Pugliese
- Brumana International
- Brummana
