= Schaal Sels =

Bicycle road race in Merksem, Belgium

Race details
- Date: Late August-Early September
- Region: Flanders, Belgium
- Local name(s): Schaal Sels-Merksem (in Dutch)
- Discipline: Road
- Competition: UCI Europe Tour
- Type: Single-day
- Web site: www.schaalsels.be

History
- First edition: 1921
- Editions: 96 (as of 2024)
- First winner: René Vermandel (BEL)
- Most wins: Steven de Jongh (NED) (3 wins)
- Most recent: Floris Van Tricht (BEL)

Schaal Sels is a single-day road bicycle race held annually in September in Merksem, Belgium. Since 2005, the race is organized as a 1.1 event on the UCI Europe Tour.

== Winners ==
=== Men ===
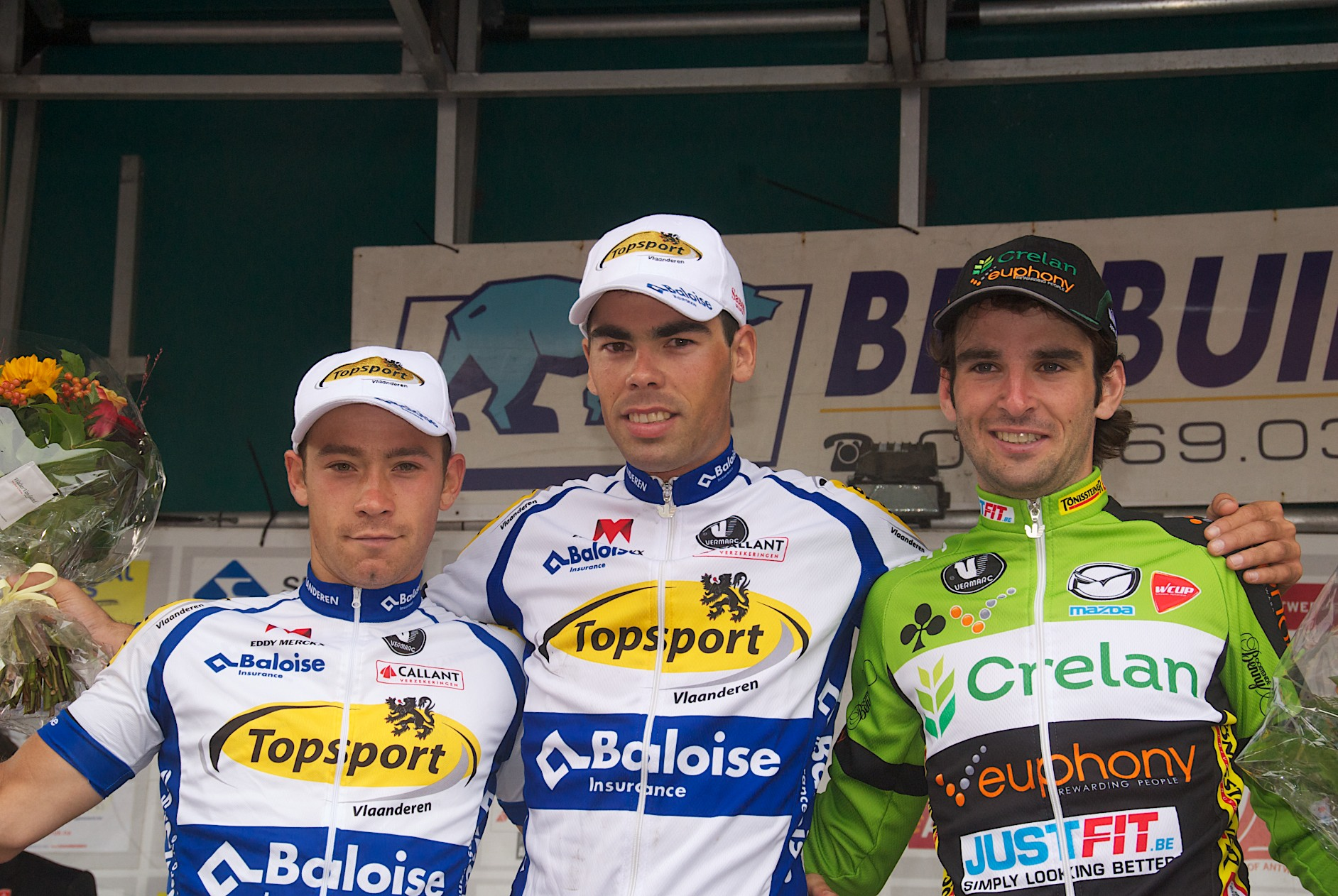
Schaal Sels 2013 : Michael Van Staeyen (2), Pieter Jacobs (1) & Baptiste Planckaert (3).

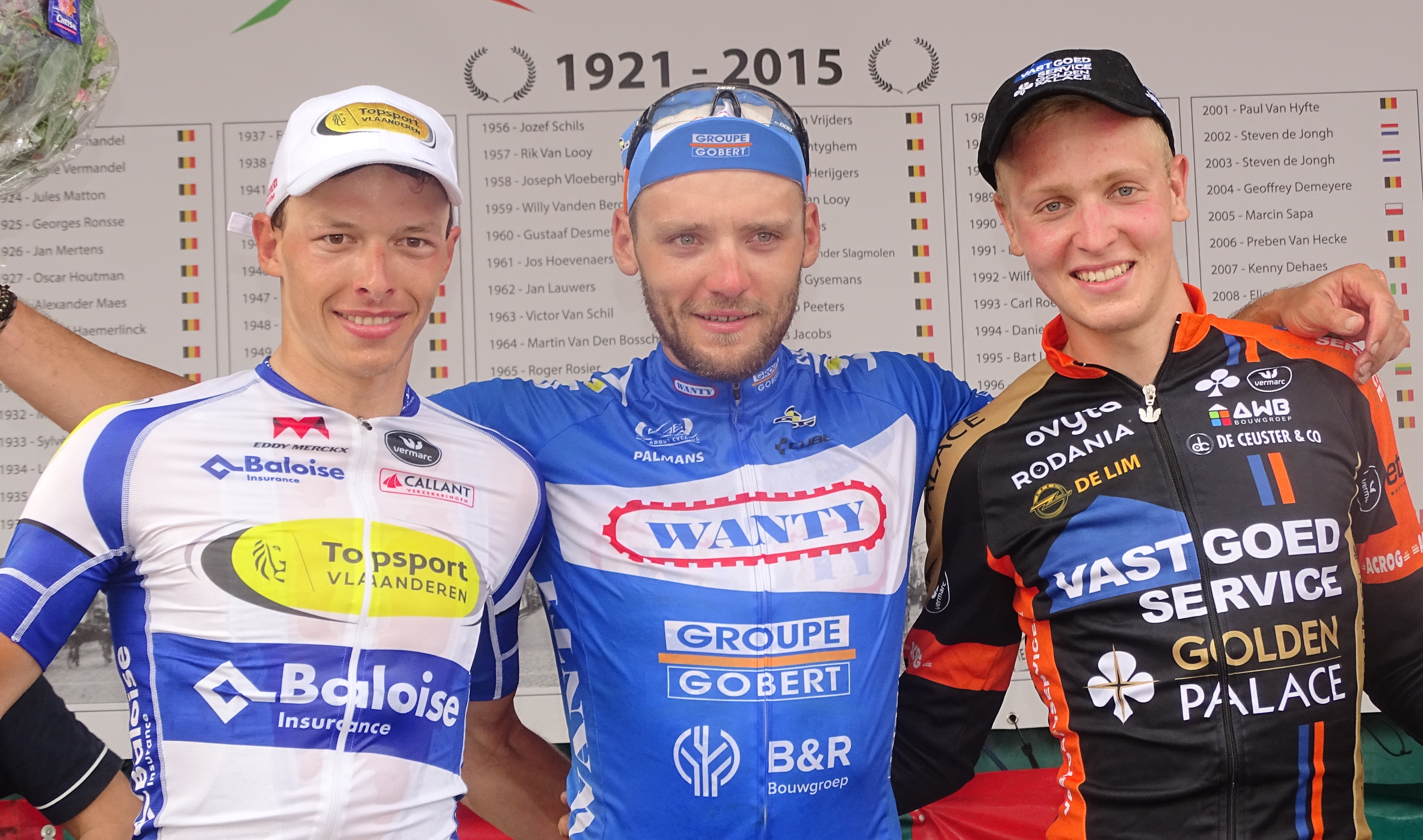
Schaal Sels 2015 : Oliver Naesen (2), Robin Stenuit (1) & Tim Merlier (3).

Year	Country	Rider	Team
1921	Belgium	René Vermandel	individual
1922	No race		
1923	Belgium	René Vermandel	Alcyon–Dunlop
1924	Belgium	Jules Matton	Thomann–Dunlop
1925	Belgium	Georges Ronsse	individual
1926	Belgium	Jan Mertens	Labor–Dunlop
1927	Belgium	Oscar Houtman	individual
1928	Belgium	Alexander Maes	individual
1929	Belgium	Alfred Haemerlinck	Génial Lucifer–Hutchinson
1930	Belgium	Frans Bonduel	Dilecta–Wolber
1931	Belgium	Odiel Van Hevel	t'Belfort
1932	Belgium	Maurice Croon	individual
1933	Belgium	Sylvère Maes	Alcyon–Dunlop
1934	Belgium	Leo De Rijck	individual
1935	Belgium	Sylvain Grysolle	individual
1936	Belgium	Sylvain Grysolle	Dilecta–Wolber
1937	Belgium	Frans Bonduel	Dilecta–Wolber
1938	Belgium	Frans Spiessens	Helyett–Hutchinson
1939– 1940	No race		
1941	Belgium	Maurice Clautier	Alcyon–Dunlop
1942	Belgium	Gustaaf Van Overloop	Alcyon–Dunlop
1943	Belgium	André Defoort	individual
1944– 1945	No race		
1946	Belgium	Jérôme Dufromont	individual
1947	Belgium	August Van Mirlo	individual
1948	Belgium	Josef De Beuckelaer	individual
1949	Belgium	Edward Peeters	Van Hauwaert–Dubonnet
1950	Belgium	Ernest Sterckx	L'Avenir
1951	Belgium	Lucien Mathys	Groene Leeuw
1952	Luxembourg	Marcel Dierkens	Bertin–D'Alessandro
1953	Belgium	René Mertens	Groene Leeuw
1953	Belgium	Gerard Buyl	Dossche Sport
1954	Belgium	Stan Ockers	Girardengo–Eldorado
1955	Belgium	Joseph Marien	Girardengo–Eldorado
1956	Belgium	Jozef Schils	Faema–Guerra
1957	Belgium	Rik Van Looy	Faema–Guerra
1958	Belgium	Jozef Vloebergs	Libertas–Dr. Mann
1959	Belgium	Willy Vanden Berghen	amateur
1960	Belgium	Gustaaf De Smet	Groene Leeuw–Sinalco
1961	Belgium	Jos Hoevenaers	Dr. Mann
1962	Belgium	Jan Lauwers	amateur
1963	Belgium	Victor Van Schil	L. Bobet–BP–Hutchinson
1964	Belgium	Martin Van Den Bossche	Wiel's–Groene Leeuw
1965	Belgium	Roger Rosiers	amateur
1966	Belgium	Edward Sels	Solo–Superia
1967	Belgium	Jos Boons	Mann–Grundig
1968	Belgium	Edward Sels	Bic
1969	Belgium	Jos Huysmans	Mann–Grundig
1970	Belgium	Herman Van Springel	Mann–Grundig
1971	Belgium	Herman Vrijders	Watney–Avia
1972	Belgium	Noël Vantyghem	Novy–Dubble Bubble
1973	Belgium	August Herijgers	IJsboerke–Bertin
1974	Belgium	Frans Van Looy	Carpenter–Flandria
1975	Belgium	Jos Jacobs	IJsboerke–Colner
1976	Belgium	Marcel Vander Slagmolen	Flandria–Velda
1977	Belgium	Emile Gijsemans	IJsboerke–Colnago
1978	Belgium	Ludo Peeters	IJsboerke–Gios
1979	Belgium	Jos Jacobs	IJsboerke–Warncke Eis
1980	Belgium	Benjamin Vermeulen	Boston–IFI–Mavic
1981	Belgium	Walter Schoonjans	Rianta
1982	Belgium	Jan Bogaert	Europ Decor
1983	Belgium	René Martens	Jacky Aernoudt Meubelen–Rossin–Campagnolo
1984	Belgium	Gery Verlinden	Splendor–Mondial Moquettes–Marc
1985	Belgium	Luc Govaerts	Lotto
1986	Belgium	Frank Verleyen	Transvemij–Van Schilt
1987	Belgium	Ludo De Keulenaer	Panasonic–Isostar
1988	Belgium	Patrick Verschueren	Roland
1989	Belgium	Carl Roes	Lotto–Vlaanderen–Jong–Mbk–Merckx
1990	Belgium	Peter Spaenhoven	S.E.F.B.–Saxon
1991	Belgium	Edwig Van Hooydonck	Buckler–Colnago–Decca
1992	Belgium	Wilfried Peeters	Team Telekom
1993	Belgium	Carl Roes	Lotto
1994	Belgium	Daniel Verelst	Trident–Schick
1995	Belgium	Bart Leysen	Mapei–GB–Latexco
1996	Belgium	Glenn D'Hollander	Vlaanderen 2002–Eddy Merckx
1997	Belgium	Tom Steels	Mapei–GB
1998	Netherlands	Danny Nelissen	home–Jack & Jones
1999	United States	Fred Rodriguez	Mapei–Quick-Step
2000	Netherlands	Steven de Jongh	Rabobank
2001	Belgium	Paul Van Hyfte	Lotto–Adecco
2002	Netherlands	Steven de Jongh	Rabobank
2003	Netherlands	Steven de Jongh	Rabobank
2004	Belgium	Geoffrey Demeyere	Vlaanderen–T Interim
2005	Poland	Marcin Sapa	Knauf Team
2006	Belgium	Preben Van Hecke	Davitamon–Lotto
2007	Belgium	Kenny Dehaes	Chocolade Jacques–Topsport Vlaanderen
2008	Italy	Elia Rigotto	Team Milram
2009	Belgium	Kris Boeckmans	Silence–Lotto
2010	Lithuania	Aidis Kruopis	Palmans–Cras
2011	Lithuania	Aidis Kruopis	Landbouwkrediet
2012	Belgium	Niko Eeckhout	An Post–Sean Kelly
2013	Belgium	Pieter Jacobs	Topsport Vlaanderen–Baloise
2014	No race due to roadworks on finish line		
2015	Belgium	Robin Stenuit	Wanty–Groupe Gobert
2016	Belgium	Wout van Aert	Crelan–Vastgoedservice
2017	Netherlands	Taco van der Hoorn	Roompot–Nederlandse Loterij
2018	Belgium	Timothy Dupont	Wanty–Groupe Gobert
2019	Italy	Attilio Viviani	Cofidis
2020	No race due to COVID-19 pandemic in Belgium		
2021	No race due to COVID-19 pandemic in Belgium		
2022	Belgium	Arnaud De Lie	Lotto–Soudal
2023	Belgium	Lionel Taminiaux	Alpecin–Deceuninck
2024	Belgium	Floris Van Tricht	Israel–Premier Tech

=== Women: Schaal Sels Ladies ===
Year	Country	Rider	Team
2019	Belgium	Lotte Kopecky	Lotto–Soudal Ladies
2020	No race due to COVID-19 pandemic in Belgium		
2021	No race due to COVID-19 pandemic in Belgium		
2022	Italy	Eleonora Gasparrini	Valcar–Travel & Service
2023	Belgium	Lotte Kopecky	SD Worx
2024	Belgium	Sanne Cant	Fenix–Deceuninck
