= 1922 Tour of Flanders =

Race details
- Dates: 1922
- Stages: 1
- Distance: 253 km (157.2 mi)

Results
	Winner	Léon Devos (BEL)
	Second	Jean Brunier (FRA)
	Third	Francis Pélissier (FRA)

== General classification ==
=== Final general classification ===
Rank	Rider	Team	Time
1	Léon Devos (BEL)		
2	Jean Brunier (FRA)	J.B.Louvet-Soly	
3	Francis Pélissier (FRA)	J.B.Louvet-Soly	
4	Henri Pélissier (FRA)		
5	Hilaire Hellebaut (BEL)		
6	Camille Leroy (BEL)		
7	Edward Maes (BEL)		
8	Laurent Seret (BEL)		
9	Victor Standaert (BEL)		
10	Edouard Thysman (BEL)		
