= François Faillu =

French cyclist

Personal information
- Born: 17 May 1900
- Died: 1 February 1974 (aged 73)

Cycling career
- Sport: Cycling
- Discipline: Road
- Role: Rider

François Faillu (17 May 1900 – 1 February 1974) was a French racing cyclist. He rode in the 1926 Tour de France.
