= Albert Flahaut =

French cyclist

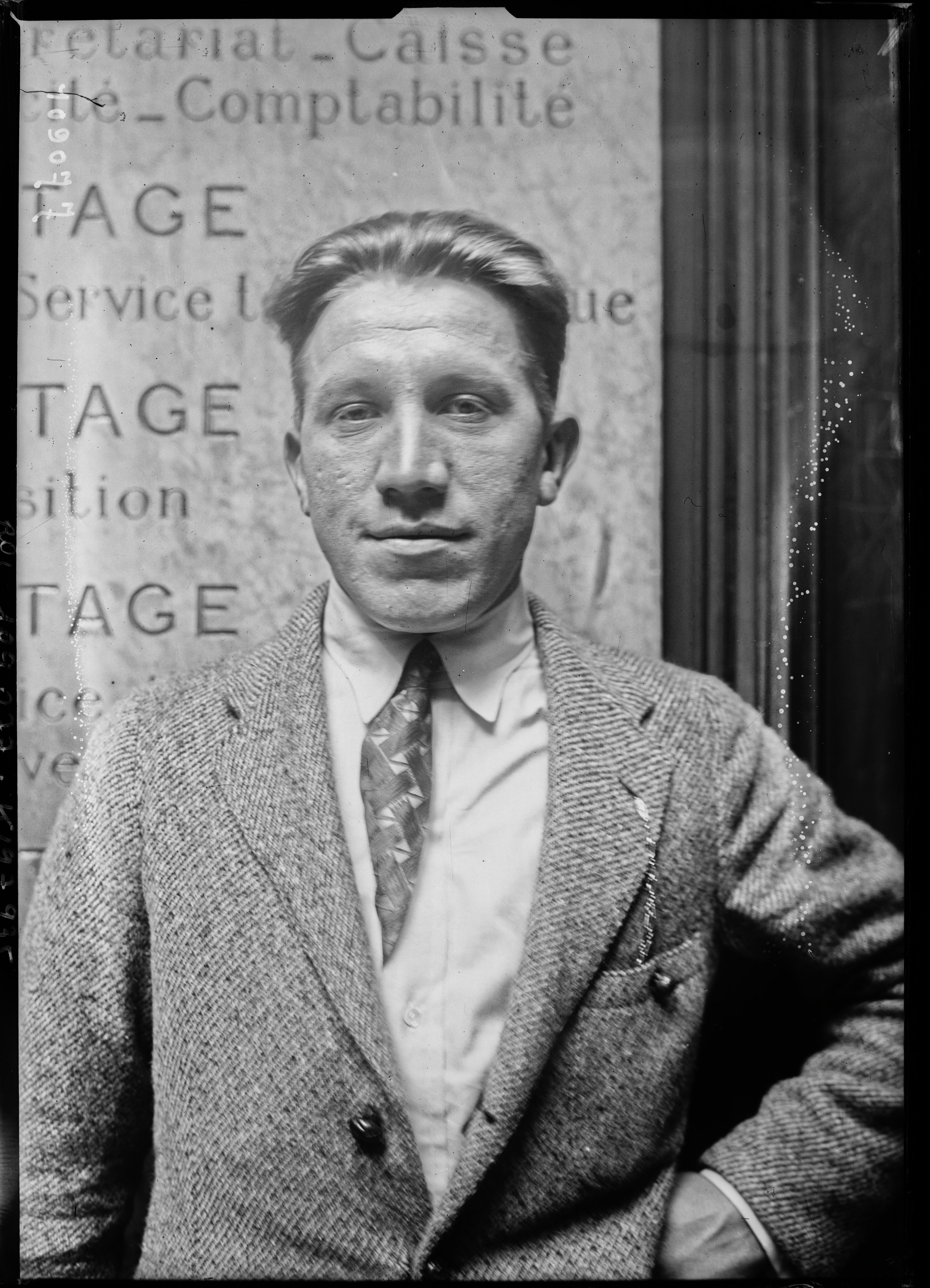

Personal information
- Born: 1897

Cycling career
- Sport: Cycling
- Discipline: Road
- Role: Rider

Albert Flahaut (born 1897, date of death unknown) was a French racing cyclist. He rode in the 1926 Tour de France.
