= Alfred Louchet =

French racing cyclist (1902–1944)

Personal information
- Full name: Alfred Yvon Louchet
- Born: 6 June 1902 Aumale, France
- Died: 26 January 1944 (aged 41) Mauthausen concentration camp, Nazi Germany

Cycling career
- Sport: Cycling
- Discipline: Road
- Role: Rider

Alfred Yvon Louchet (6 June 1902 – 26 January 1944) was a French racing cyclist. He rode in the 1926 Tour de France. He died in the Mauthausen concentration camp during World War II.
