= Joseph Le Boubennec =

French cyclist

Personal information
- Born: 25 February 1892

Cycling career
- Sport: Cycling
- Discipline: Road
- Role: Rider

Joseph Le Boubennec (born 25 February 1892, date of death unknown) was a French racing cyclist. He rode in the 1926 Tour de France.
