= Battista Ghiano =

Italian cyclist

Personal information
- Born: 27 September 1899

Cycling career
- Sport: Cycling
- Discipline: Road
- Role: Rider

Battista Ghiano (born 27 September 1899, date of death unknown) was an Italian racing cyclist. He rode in the 1926 Tour de France.
