= Luigi Cecili =

Italian cyclist

Personal information
- Born: 11 February 1902

Cycling career
- Sport: Cycling
- Discipline: Road
- Role: Rider

Luigi Cecili (born 11 February 1902, date of death unknown) was an Italian racing cyclist. He rode in the 1926 Tour de France.
