= Eupithecia buysseata =

Scientific classification
- Kingdom: Animalia
- Phylum: Arthropoda
- Clade: Pancrustacea
- Class: Insecta
- Order: Lepidoptera
- Family: Geometridae
- Genus: Eupithecia
- Species: E. buysseata

Binomial name
- Eupithecia buysseata Mironov & Galsworthy, 2011

Species of moth

Eupithecia buysseata is a moth in the family Geometridae. It is found in Yunnan, China. It is named for Paul Buysse in "recognition of his unfailing fascination with the moths".

The wingspan is 20 mm (0.79 in) for the holotype, a male, the only known specimen.
