= René Vermandel =

Belgian cyclist (1893–1958)

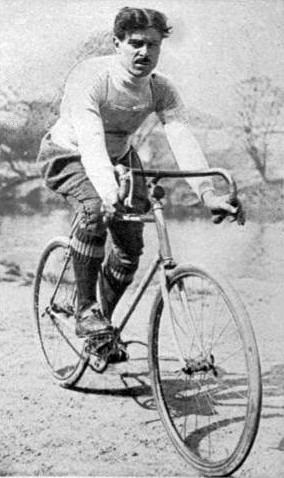
- René Vermandel (1921)

Personal information
- Born: 23 March 1893 Zelzate, Belgium
- Died: 20 April 1958 (aged 65) Anderlecht, Belgium

Cycling career
- Sport: Cycling
- Discipline: Road
- Role: Rider

Professional teams
- 1920–1921: Individual
- 1922–1924: Alcyon–Dunlop
- 1925: Individual
- 1926: Opel–Pollack
- 1926: Méteore–Wolber
- 1927: Opel–ZR III
- 1928–1931: Individual

René Vermandel (23 March 1893 – 20 April 1958) was a Belgian cyclist. He most notably won Liège–Bastogne–Liège in 1923 and 1924, as well as the 1921 Tour of Flanders. He finished in 2nd place in the 1923 Paris–Roubaix and 4th place in the 1921 Paris–Roubaix. He also rode in the 1921 Tour de France.

== Major results ==
1913
5th Liège–Bastogn–Liège
1920
3rd Road race, National Road Championships
3rd Paris–Brussels
8th Paris–Tours
10th Overall Tour of Belgium

1st Stages 3 & 4

1921
1st National Cyclo-cross Championships
1st Tour of Flanders
1st Overall Tour of Belgium

1st Stage 3

1st Scheldeprijs
1st Schaal Sels
1st Paris–Dijon
1st De Drie Zustersteden
2nd Road race, National Road Championships
2nd Critérium des As
4th Paris–Roubaix
1922
1st Road race, National Road Championships
1st Critérium des As
1st Overall Tour of Belgium

1st Stages 1, 2 & 3

1st Overall Criterium du Midi

1st Stages 1, 2 & 3

1st Jemeppe–Marche–Jemeppe
1st Stage 1 Paris-Saint-Étienne
3rd Paris–Brussels
1923
1st Liège–Bastogne–Liège
1st Schaal Sels
1st Overall Circuit de Champagne

1st Stages 1 & 2

1st Circuit de Paris
2nd Paris–Roubaix
3rd Road race, National Road Championships
5th Overall Tour of Belgium

1st Stage 4

1924
1st Road race, National Road Championships
1st Liège–Bastogne–Liège
1st Scheldeprijs
1st Stages 1 & 5 Tour of Belgium
1st Stage 3 Criterium du Midi
2nd Tour of Flanders
3rd Schaal Sels
1925
1st Overall Criterium du Midi

1st Stage 1

3rd Schaal Sels
1926
1st Rund um Leipzig
2nd Schaal Sels
1927
1st Rund um Leipzig
1928
3rd Overall Tour of Belgium

1st Stage 3
