= Norbert Larose =

French cyclist

Personal information
- Born: 8 June 1899
- Died: 24 April 1954 (aged 54)

Cycling career
- Sport: Cycling
- Discipline: Road
- Role: Rider

Norbert Larose (8 June 1899 – 24 April 1954) was a French racing cyclist. He rode in the 1926 Tour de France.
