= Germain Bezille =

French cyclist

Personal information
- Born: 3 April 1903

Cycling career
- Sport: Cycling
- Discipline: Road
- Role: Rider

Germain Bezille (born 3 April 1903, date of death unknown) was a French racing cyclist. He rode in the 1926 Tour de France.
