= Henri Hennequin =

French cyclist

Personal information
- Born: 13 September 1898 Dakar, French Senegal

Cycling career
- Sport: Cycling
- Discipline: Road
- Role: Rider

Henri Hennequin (born 13 September 1898, date of death unknown) was a French racing cyclist. He rode in the 1926 Tour de France.
