= Baptiste Mousset =

French cyclist

Personal information
- Born: 11 March 1894

Cycling career
- Sport: Cycling
- Discipline: Road
- Role: Rider

Baptiste Mousset (born 11 March 1894, date of death unknown) was a French racing cyclist. He rode in the 1926 Tour de France.
