= Battista Recrosio =

Italian cyclist

Personal information
- Born: 2 March 1901
- Died: 30 April 1945 (aged 44)

Cycling career
- Sport: Cycling
- Discipline: Road
- Role: Rider

Battista Recrosio (2 March 1901 – 30 April 1945) was an Italian racing cyclist. He rode in the 1926 Tour de France.
