= Primo Gaida =

Swiss cyclist

Personal information
- Born: 20 September 1899 Mont-la-Ville, Switzerland

Cycling career
- Sport: Cycling
- Discipline: Road
- Role: Rider

Primo Gaida (born 20 September 1899, date of death unknown) was a Swiss racing cyclist. He rode in the 1926 Tour de France.
