= Robert Gerbaud =

French cyclist

Personal information
- Born: 27 July 1893
- Died: 1 February 1977 (aged 83)

Cycling career
- Sport: Cycling
- Role: Rider

Robert Gerbaud (27 July 1893 – 1 February 1977) was a French racing cyclist. He rode in the 1920 Tour de France.
