= Paul Buysse =

Belgian businessman (1945–2023)

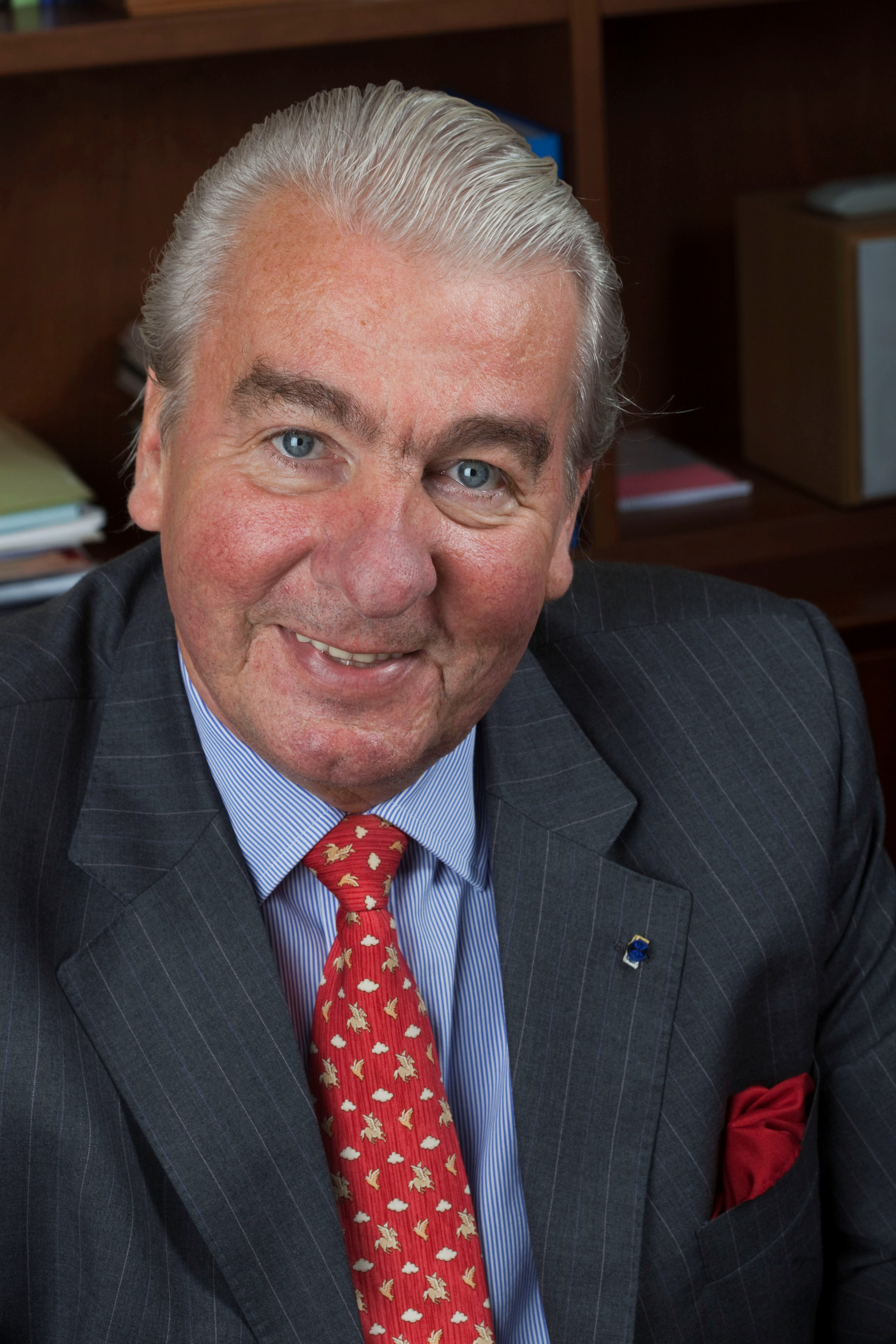
- Born: 17 March 1945; Antwerp
- Died: 30 December 2023 (aged 78)
- Education: Tenneco; Hoger Antwerps Marketing Instituut in Publiciteit
- Occupation: Businessman

Paul Henri Maria, Count Buysse, CMG, CBE (17 March 1945 – 30 December 2023) was a Belgian Captain of Industry. He was the main author of the Belgian Code for Corporate Governance (Code Buysse).

== Early life and education ==
Paul Buysse was born in Antwerp on 17 March 1945. He held a degree in Business Management from the Hoger Antwerps Marketing Instituut in Publiciteit, Marketing and PR. Buysse graduated from the Tenneco Advanced Management Programme (Mont Pelerin, Switzerland).

== Career ==
Buysse started his career in 1966 at Ford Motor Company, after which he joined British Leyland Belgium in 1976. In 1980 Buysse became executive director of Tenneco Belgium and managing director of J.I. Case Benelux and subsequently in 1984 he became general manager Europe North – J.I. Case, International Harvester and Poclain. In 1988, he joined BTR plc as group managing director of Hansen Transmissions International and was appointed in 1989 as group chief executive BTR Automotive and Engineering Group. In 1991 Paul Buysse was appointed group chief executive BTR Engineering and Dunlop Overseas and became executive director BTR plc (London) in 1992. In 1998 he became CEO of Vickers plc (London), after which in 2000 he joined the Bekaert Group as chairman of the board, which he remained until May 2014.

In addition, Count Buysse was chairman of the College of Censors of the National Bank of Belgium, vice-chairman of the Royal Higher Institute for Defence (RHID), chairman of Immobel, founder-president of NEA (a socio-economic reflection centre), member of the executive committee of the Federation of Belgian Enterprises (FEB), member of the high council of the University of Antwerp, member of the Belgian Council of INSEAD - Fontainebleau, member of the board of directors VEV (Flemish employers federation), chairman of FBNet Belgium (Family Business Network Belgium).

== Death ==
Buysse died on 30 December 2023, at the age of 78.

== Honours ==
=== National honours ===
- Incorporated in the Belgian non hereditary nobility with the personal title "Knight", by Royal Decree in 1994 of King Albert.
- Raised in the hereditary nobility with the personal title "Baron", by Royal decree in 1999.
- Created Count, for himself and for his descendants, by Royal Decree of 2 April 2014, by King Philippe of Belgium.
- Grand Officer in the Order of Leopold II by Royal decree of 2005.

=== Others ===
- Commander of the Order of the British Empire, by Royal Decree.
- Companion of the Order of St Michael and St George.
- Officer of the Order of Orange-Nassau.
- Officer of the Legion of Honour.
- Eupithecia buysseata, a species of moth named for him.

== Sources ==
- Code Buysse
- Third Belgo-British Conference : Opening speech by Minister Rik Daems at the Third Belgo-British conference

Belgian nobility
New creation	Count Buysse; 2014–2023	Incumbent
