= André Drobecq =

French cyclist

Personal information
- Full name: André Drobecq
- Born: 25 November 1900 Lormaison, France
- Died: 18 July 1997 (aged 96) Méru, France

Cycling career
- Sport: Cycling
- Role: Rider

André Drobecq (25 November 1900 – 18 July 1997) was a French racing cyclist. He finished in last place in the 1926 Tour de France to which he participated as a tourist routier.
