= Henri Tesi =

French cyclist

Personal information
- Born: 25 March 1903

Cycling career
- Sport: Cycling
- Discipline: Road
- Role: Rider

Henri Tesi (born 25 March 1903, date of death unknown) was a French racing cyclist. He rode in the 1926 Tour de France.
