= Piero Brumana =

Italian cyclist

Personal information
- Born: 30 July 1901
- Died: 17 December 1975 (aged 74)

Cycling career
- Sport: Cycling
- Discipline: Road
- Role: Rider

Piero Brumana (30 July 1901 – 17 December 1975) was an Italian racing cyclist. He rode in the 1926 Tour de France.
