= Jean Brunier =

French cyclist (1896-1981)

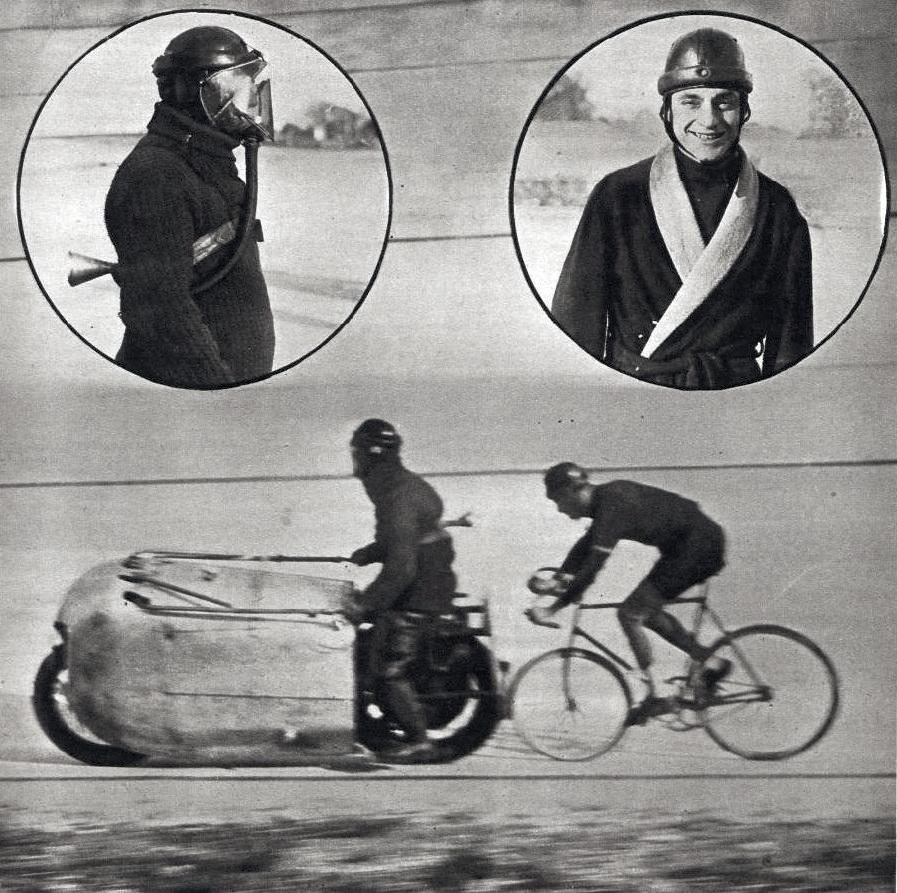

Personal information
- Full name: Jean Brunier
- Born: 9 October 1896 Paris, France
- Died: 23 June 1981 (aged 84) Paris, France

Cycling career
- Sport: Cycling
- Discipline: Road
- Role: Rider

Professional team
- 1922–1924: JB Louvet

Jean Brunier (9 October 1896 – 23 June 1981) was a French racing cyclist. He won the French national road race title in 1922.
