= Jules Gillard =

Swiss cyclist

Personal information
- Born: 21 December 1904
- Died: 31 October 1983 (aged 78)

Cycling career
- Sport: Cycling
- Discipline: Road
- Role: Rider

Jules Gillard (21 December 1904 – 31 October 1983) was a Swiss racing cyclist. He rode in the 1926 Tour de France.
