= Albert Vigna =

Monegasque cyclist (1891–1970)

Personal information
- Born: 29 January 1891
- Died: 27 November 1970 (aged 79)

Cycling career
- Sport: Cycling
- Discipline: Road
- Role: Rider

Albert Vigna (29 January 1891 – 27 November 1970) was a Monegasque racing cyclist. He rode in the 1926 Tour de France.
