= Louis Budts =

Belgian cyclist

Personal information
- Born: 7 September 1890
- Died: 29 December 1977 (aged 87)

Cycling career
- Sport: Cycling
- Role: Rider

Louis Budts (7 September 1890 – 29 December 1977) was a Belgian racing cyclist. He rode in the 1921 Tour de France.
