= Omer Vermeulen =

Belgian cyclist

Personal information
- Born: 24 November 1895 Zingem, Belgium
- Died: 27 January 1980 (aged 84) Oudenaarde, Belgium

Cycling career
- Sport: Cycling
- Discipline: Road
- Role: Rider

Omer Vermeulen (24 November 1895 – 27 January 1980) was a Belgian racing cyclist. He rode in the 1926 Tour de France.
