= André Casterman =

Belgian cyclist

Personal information
- Born: 20 April 1899
- Died: 4 January 1975 (aged 75)

Cycling career
- Sport: Cycling
- Discipline: Road
- Role: Rider

André Casterman (20 April 1899 – 4 January 1975) was a Belgian racing cyclist. He rode in the 1926 Tour de France.
