= Alfred Francini =

Italian cyclist

Personal information
- Born: 23 May 1903

Cycling career
- Sport: Cycling
- Discipline: Road
- Role: Rider

Alfred Francini (born 23 May 1903, date of death unknown) was an Italian racing cyclist. He rode in the 1925 Tour de France.
