= Laurent Seret =

Belgian cyclist

Personal information
- Born: 11 June 1896
- Died: 9 February 1978 (aged 81)

Cycling career
- Sport: Cycling
- Role: Rider

Laurent Seret (11 June 1896 – 9 February 1978) was a Belgian racing cyclist. He rode in the 1923 Tour de France.
