= Lucien Buysse =

Belgian cyclist (1892–1980)

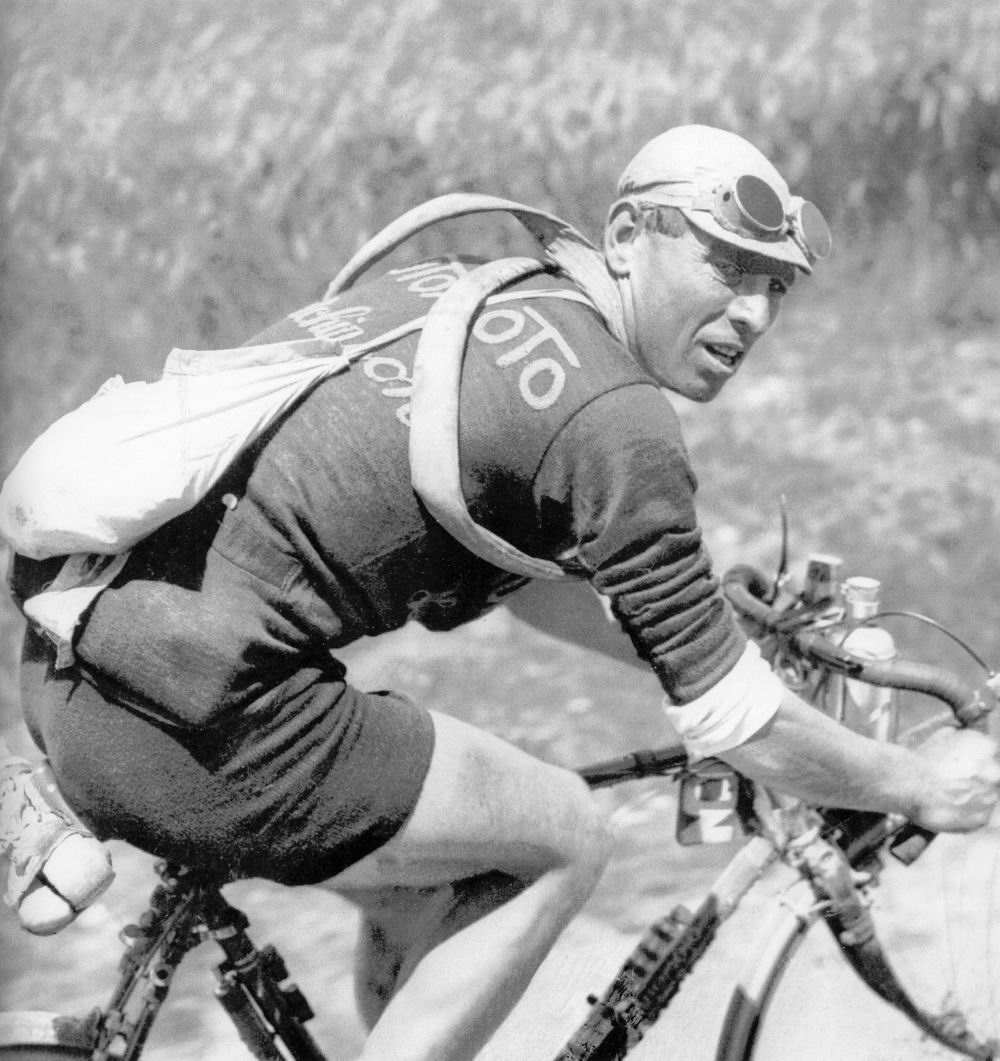

Personal information
- Full name: Lucien Buysse
- Born: 11 September 1892 Deinze, Belgium
- Died: 3 January 1980 (aged 87) Deinze, Belgium

Cycling career
- Sport: Cycling
- Discipline: Road
- Role: Rider

Major wins
- Road Grand Tours Tour de France General classification (1926) Mountains classification (1926) 5 individual stages (1923, 1925, 1926) One-day races and Classics Stadsprijs Geraardsbergen (1927) Track Six Days of Ghent (1923)

Lucien Buysse (French: [lysjɛ̃ bɥis], Flemish: [lyˈɕɛ̃ː ˈbœysə]; 11 September 1892 – 3 January 1980) was a Belgian cyclist and a champion of the Tour de France.

== Career ==
Born in Wontergem, Buysse began racing professionally in 1914, when he entered the Tour de France but did not finish. He resumed his career after World War I, entering but abandoning the Tour again in 1919 but placing third in the Paris–Roubaix classic in 1920. In 1923 he completed the Tour de France and finished in eighth place. In the 1924 and 1925 Tours, he rode with the Italian Automoto team led by Ottavio Bottecchia, where he was perhaps the first domestique in the history of the Tour. He placed third in 1924 and second in 1925.

The 1926 Tour was the longest in its history (5,745 km), with 17 stages averaging 338 km. Buysse, racing with his two brothers Jules and Michel, took the yellow jersey from Gustave Van Slembrouck on stage 10 by attacking during a furious storm on the Col d'Aspin in the Pyrenees. He gained almost an hour during the stage over his team leader Bottecchia who then abandoned. Buysse arrived in Paris as the champion despite suffering the loss of his daughter during the race.

In 1926, Buysse forced the Tour de France organiser Henri Desgrange to create a new rule when he eliminated the entire field by finishing so far ahead that everyone else was outside the limit. Desgrange extended the day's limit to 40 per cent of the winner's time and ruled that nobody in the first 10 could be eliminated.

Buysse won a total of five stages of the Tour during his career: one in 1923; two in 1925 and two in 1926.

== Career achievements ==
=== Major results ===
1912
8th Scheldeprijs
1913
1st Tour of Belgium for amateurs
8th Liège–Bastogne–Liège
1914
1st Brussels-Liège for amateurs
6th place overall classification Tour of Belgium
1919
3rd Grand Prix de l'Armistice (fr)
3rd Gran Fondo
10th Milan–San Remo
8th Scheldeprijs
10th Belgian National Road Race Championships, Road race
1920
2nd Liège–Bastogne–Liège
3rd Paris–Roubaix
6th Kampioenschap van Vlaanderen
1921
Winner Stage 5 Tour of Belgium
3rd Arlon–Ostend
4th Overall Giro d'Italia
1922
1st Lier
5th Tour of Flanders
7th Kampioenschap van Vlaanderen
7th Belgian National Road Race Championships, Road race
1923
Tour de France

8th place overall classification
Winner stage 8

1st Critérium of Amsterdam
4th Kampioenschap van Vlaanderen
1924
Tour de France:

3rd place overall classification

1925
Tour de France:

2nd place overall classification
Winner stages 11 and 12

9th Paris–Tours
1926
Tour de France:

Winner overall classification
Winner stages 10 and 11

3rd Bordeaux–Paris
9th Paris–Brussels
1927
1st Stadsprijs Geraardsbergen
Tour of the Basque Country

3rd place overall classification
Winner stage 4

3rd Critérium du Midi
5th Bordeaux–Paris
1928
2nd Kampioenschap van Vlaanderen
4th Tour of Flanders
1929
8th Paris–Brussels

=== Track cycling ===
1922
2nd Six Days of Ghent (with Henri Van Lerberghe)
1923
1st Six Days of Ghent (with Victor Standaert)
1924
2nd Six Days of Ghent (with Jules Van Hevel)
1925
3rd Six Days of Ghent (with Emile Thollembeek)

=== Grand Tour results timeline ===
	1914	1915	1916	1917	1918	1919	1920	1921	1922	1923	1924	1925	1926	1927	1928	1929	1930
Giro d'Italia	DNE	N/A	N/A	N/A	N/A	DNE	DNE	4	DNE	DNE	DNE	DNE	DNE	DNE	DNE	DNE	DNE
Stages won	—	N/A	N/A	N/A	N/A	—	—	—	—	—	—	—	—	—	—	—	—
Tour de France	DNF-10	N/A	N/A	N/A	N/A	DNF-2	DNE	DNE	DNE	8	3	2	1	DNE	DNE	DNF-9	DNF-16
Stages won	0	N/A	N/A	N/A	N/A	0	—	—	—	1	0	2	2	—	—	0	0
Vuelta a España	N/A	N/A	N/A	N/A	N/A	N/A	N/A	N/A	N/A	N/A	N/A	N/A	N/A	N/A	N/A	N/A	N/A
Stages won	N/A	N/A	N/A	N/A	N/A	N/A	N/A	N/A	N/A	N/A	N/A	N/A	N/A	N/A	N/A	N/A	N/A

Legend
1	Winner
2–3	Top three-finish
4–10	Top ten-finish
11–	Other finish
DNE	Did not enter
DNF-x	Did not finish (retired on stage x)
DNS-x	Did not start (not started on stage x)
HD-x	Finished outside time limit (occurred on stage x)
DSQ	Disqualified
N/A	Race/classification not held
NR	Not ranked in this classification
