= Carlo Longoni =

Italian cyclist

Personal information
- Born: 24 November 1889 Carate Brianza
- Died: 1969 (aged 79–80)

Cycling career
- Sport: Cycling
- Discipline: Road
- Role: Rider

Carlo Longoni (24 November 1889 – 1969) was an Italian racing cyclist. He rode in the 1923 Tour de France, and the 1926 Tour de France.
