= Jules-Richard Matton =

Belgian cyclist

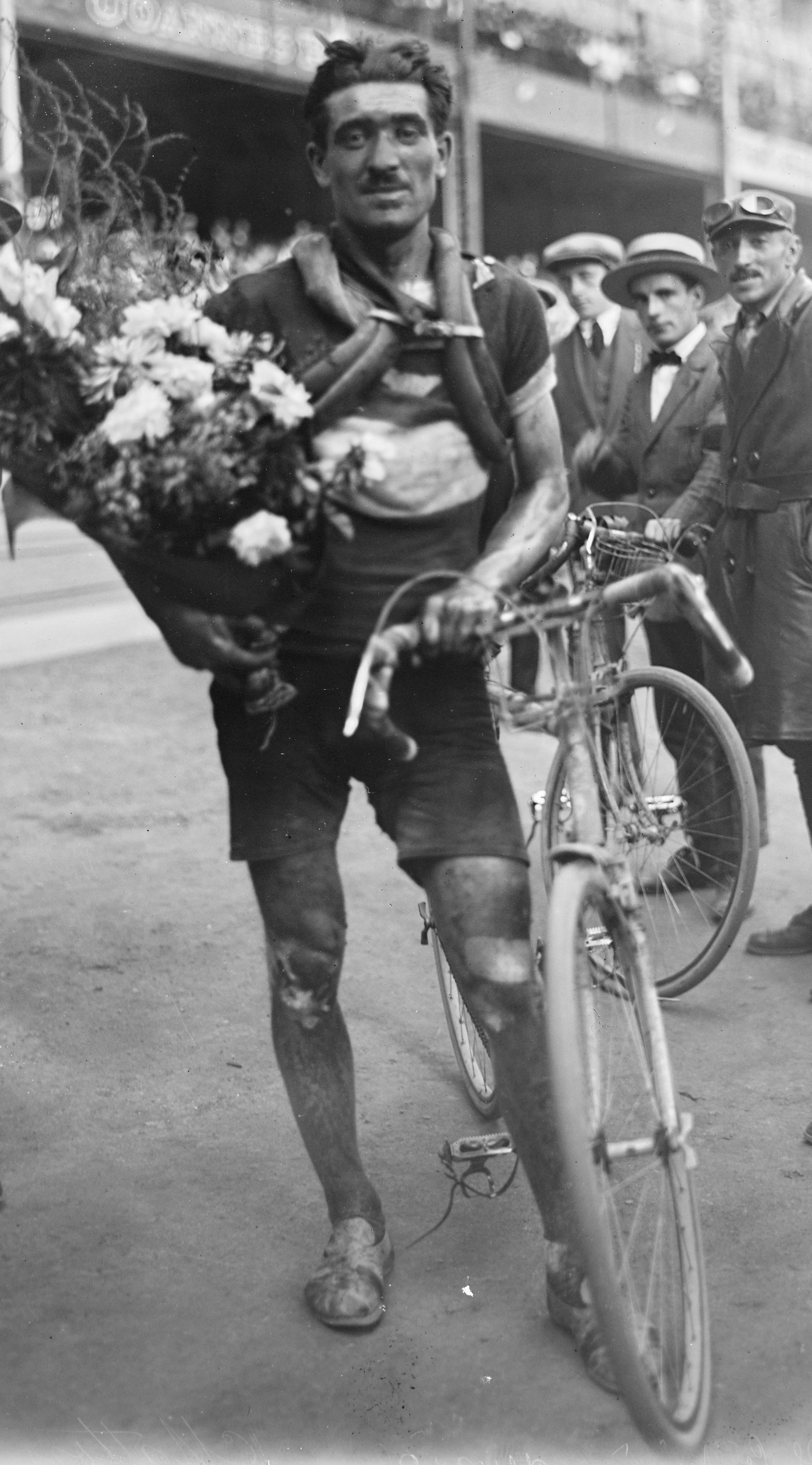
- Matton in 1925

Personal information
- Born: 10 October 1897
- Died: 21 October 1973 (aged 76)

Cycling career
- Sport: Cycling
- Role: Rider

Jules-Richard Matton (10 October 1897 – 21 October 1973) was a Belgian racing cyclist. He rode in the 1922 Tour de France.
