= Wontergem =

Village in Belgium

Coordinates: 50°58′45″N 3°26′39″E

Location of Wontergem

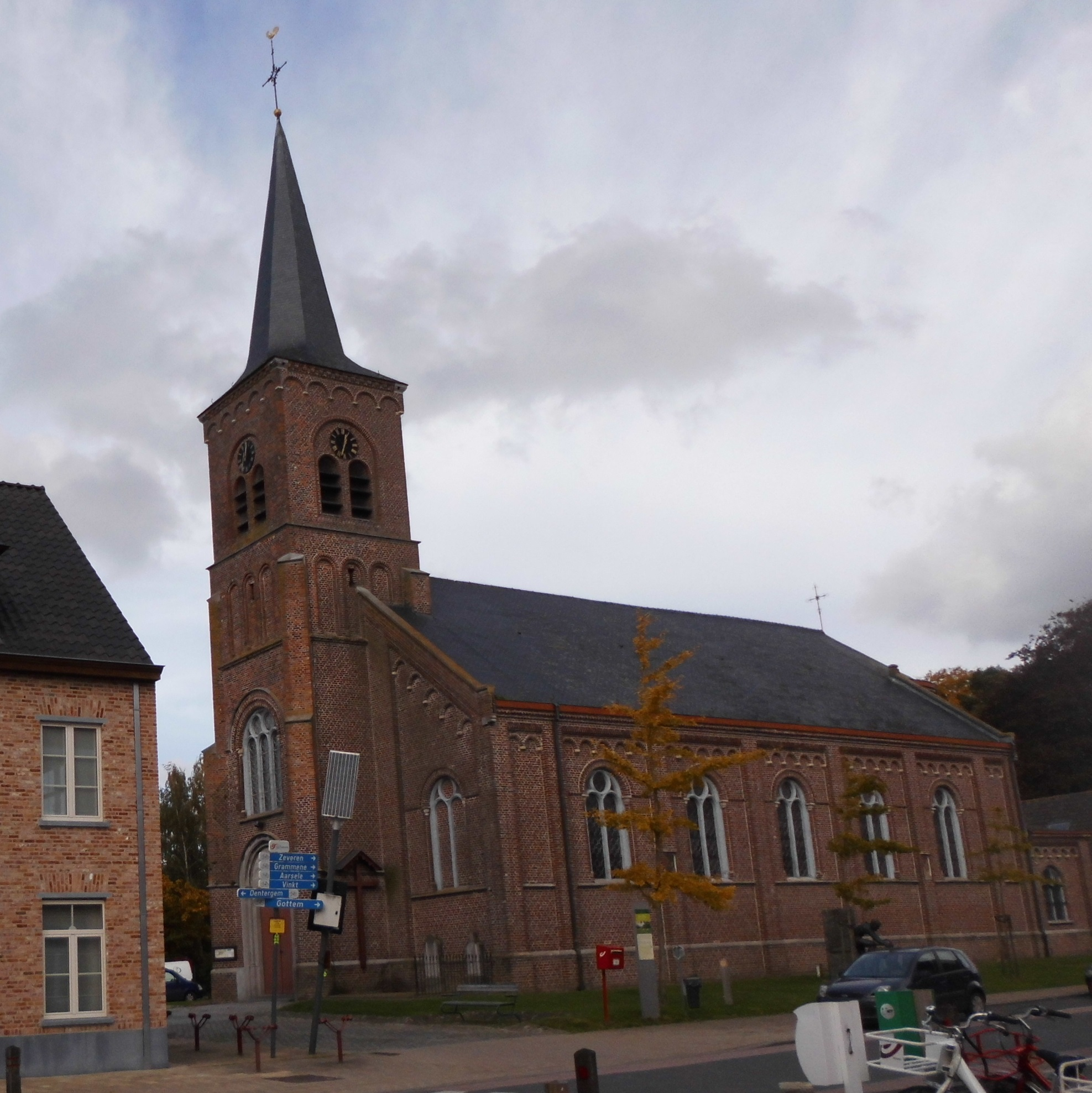
Church in Wontergem (2015)

Wontergem is a village in the Belgian province of East Flanders and is a submunicipality of Deinze. It was an independent municipality until the municipal reorganization of 1977. Wontergem is located west of Deinze, near the border with West Flanders, near the Oude Mandel. The village had 821 inhabitants in 1981.

The oldest mention of Wontergem is from around 1019-1030 Guntrengem. The name Wontergem was first used in 1320. Wontergem was part of the Land van Nevele. In addition to various lordships, the Drongen Abbey had also possessions here.

The "Sisters of Saint Vincent" from Dentergem settled here and founded a school in 1905.
