= Émile Hardy =

Belgian cyclist

Emile Hardy
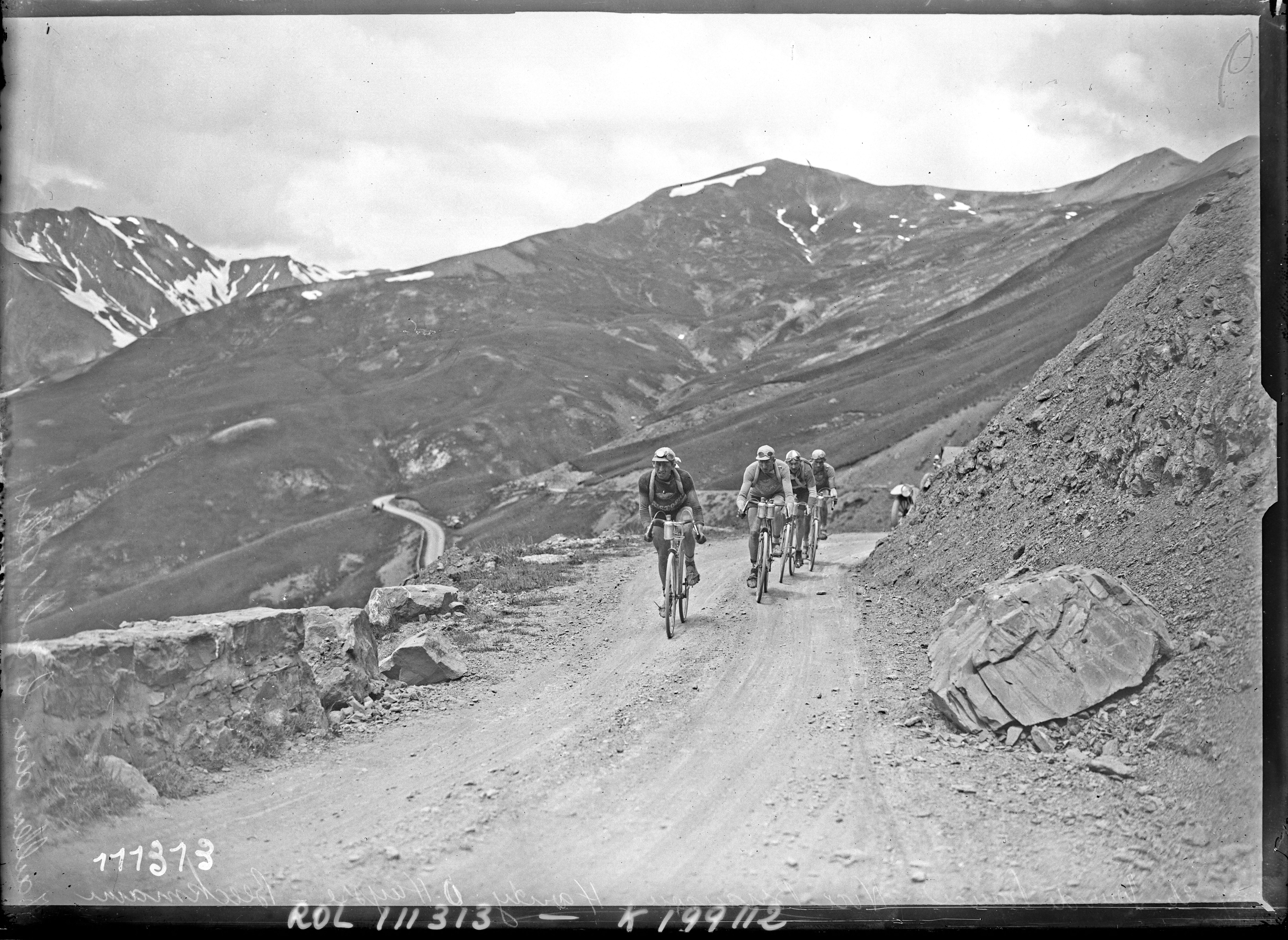
- Hardy in this group at Col d'Allos during the Nice-Briançon stage at Tour de France on 14 July 1926.

Personal information
- Born: 10 May 1897
- Died: 7 October 1967 (aged 70)

Cycling career
- Sport: Cycling
- Discipline: Road
- Role: Rider

Emile Hardy (18 May 1897 – 7 October 1967) was a Belgian racing cyclist. He rode in the 1924 Tour de France.
