= Jules Buysse =

Belgian cyclist

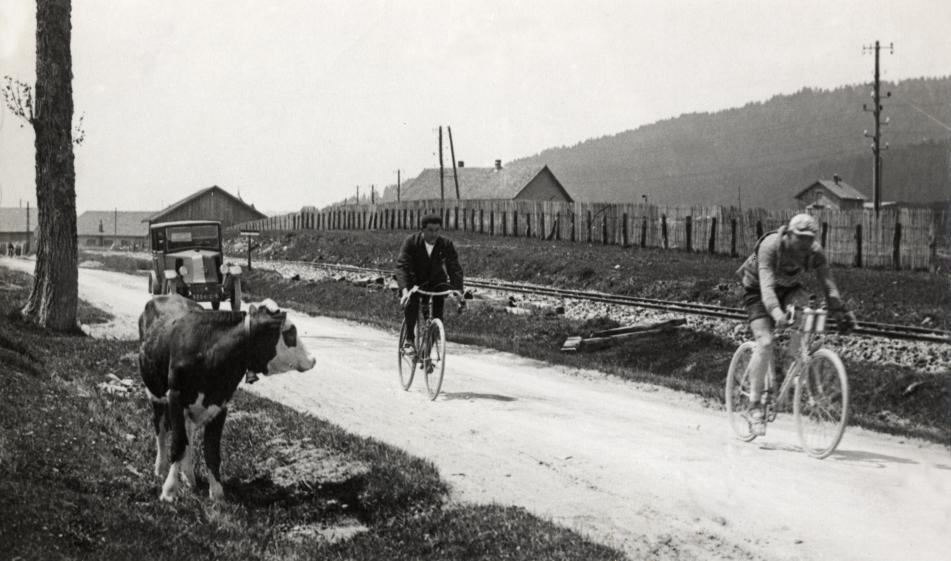
- Jules Buysse wins the first stage in the Tour de France 1926

Personal information
- Full name: Jules Buysse
- Born: 13 August 1901 Wontergem, Belgium
- Died: 31 December 1950 (aged 49)

Cycling career
- Sport: Cycling
- Discipline: Road
- Role: Rider

Major wins
- Grand Tours Tour de France 1 individual stage (1926)

Jules Buysse (13 August 1901 – 31 December 1950) was a Belgian racing cyclist.

Buysse was the youngest of three brothers who competed in the Tour de France. He won the first stage of 1926 Tour de France by 13 minutes and 6 seconds, allowing him to wear the yellow jersey for two days until losing it to fellow Belgian Gustave Van Slembrouck. He finished the tour in 9th place.

His brothers were Lucien Buysse, who won the 1926 Tour de France, and Marcel Buysse who won six stages on the 1913 Tour.

== Major results ==
1925
1925 Tour de France:

15th place overall classification

1926
1926 Tour de France:

Winner stage 1
Leading general classification for two days
9th place overall classification

1932
1932 Tour de France:

40th place overall classification
