= Joseph Van Dam =

Belgian cyclist

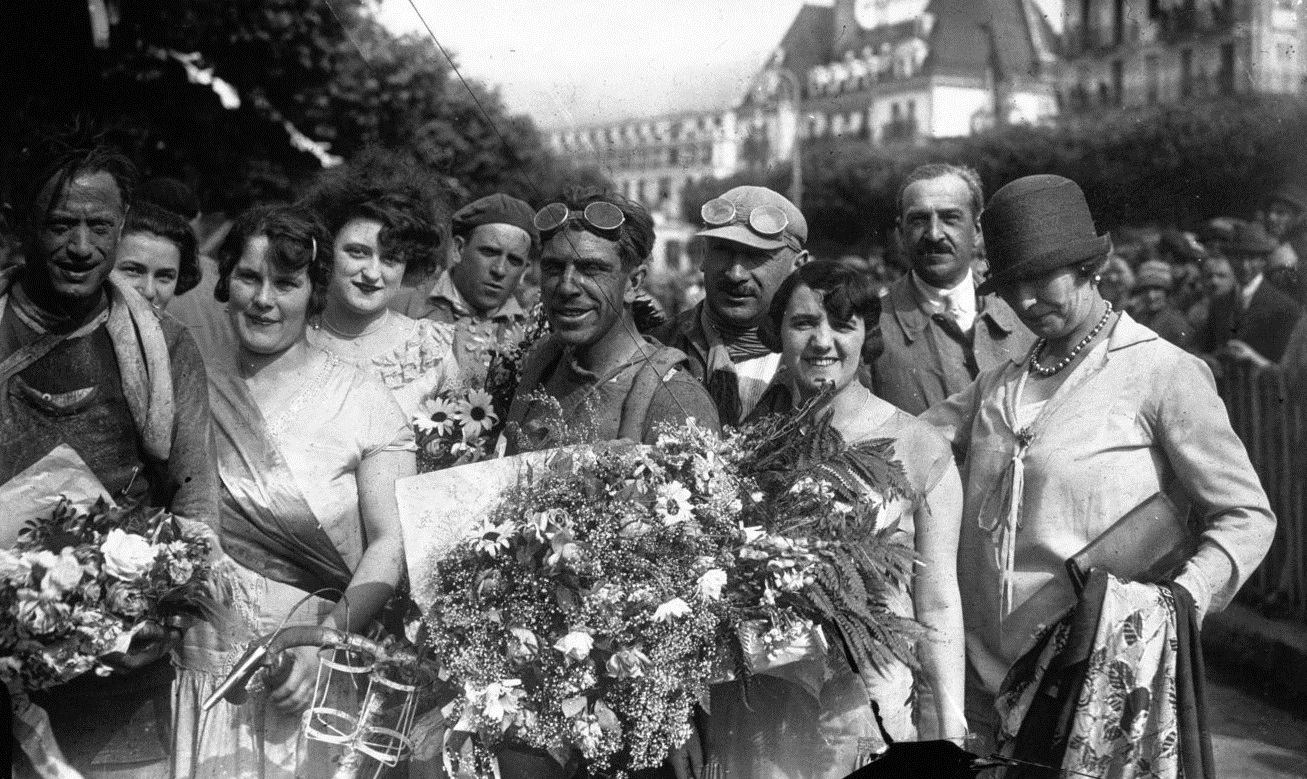

Personal information
- Full name: Joseph Van Dam
- Born: 2 November 1901 Willebroek, Belgium
- Died: 31 May 1986 (aged 84) Willebroek, Belgium

Cycling career
- Sport: Cycling
- Discipline: Road/Cyclo-cross
- Role: Rider

Major wins
- 3 stages 1926 Tour de France

Joseph Van Dam (Willebroek, 2 November 1901 — Willebroek, 31 May 1986) was a Belgian professional road bicycle racer. Van Dam entered the 1926 Tour de France, won three stages and finished 12th place in the general classification

== Major results ==
1924
Belgium national cyclo-cross championship
1926
Brussels-Liège for amateurs
1926 Tour de France:

Winner stages 6, 8 and 15
12th place overall classification
