= Léon Parmentier =

Belgian cyclist

Personal information
- Born: 20 March 1901
- Died: 21 October 1949 (aged 48)

Cycling career
- Sport: Cycling
- Discipline: Road
- Role: Rider

Léon Parmentier (20 March 1901 – 21 October 1949) was a Belgian racing cyclist. He rode in the 1926 Tour de France.
