= Odile Tailleu =

Belgian cyclist

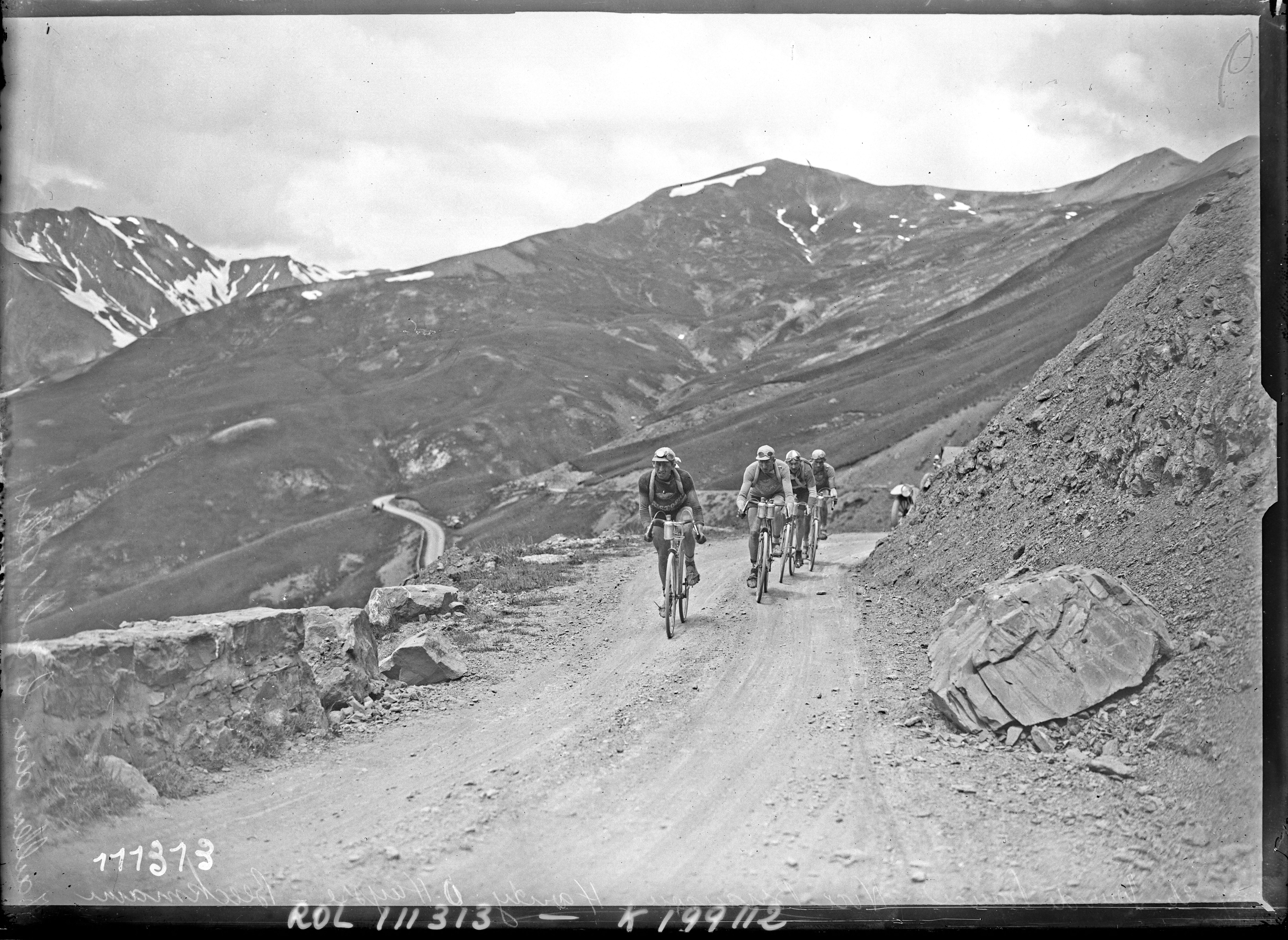
- Tailleu in this group at Col d'Allos during the Nice-Briançon stage at Tour de France on 14 July 1926.

Personal information
- Born: 27 March 1898
- Died: 11 May 1979 (aged 81)

Cycling career
- Sport: Cycling
- Discipline: Road
- Role: Rider

Odile Tailleu (27 March 1898 – 11 May 1979) was a Belgian racing cyclist. He rode in the 1926, 1927, 1928 and 1930 Tour de France.
