= Georges Cuvelier =

French cyclist

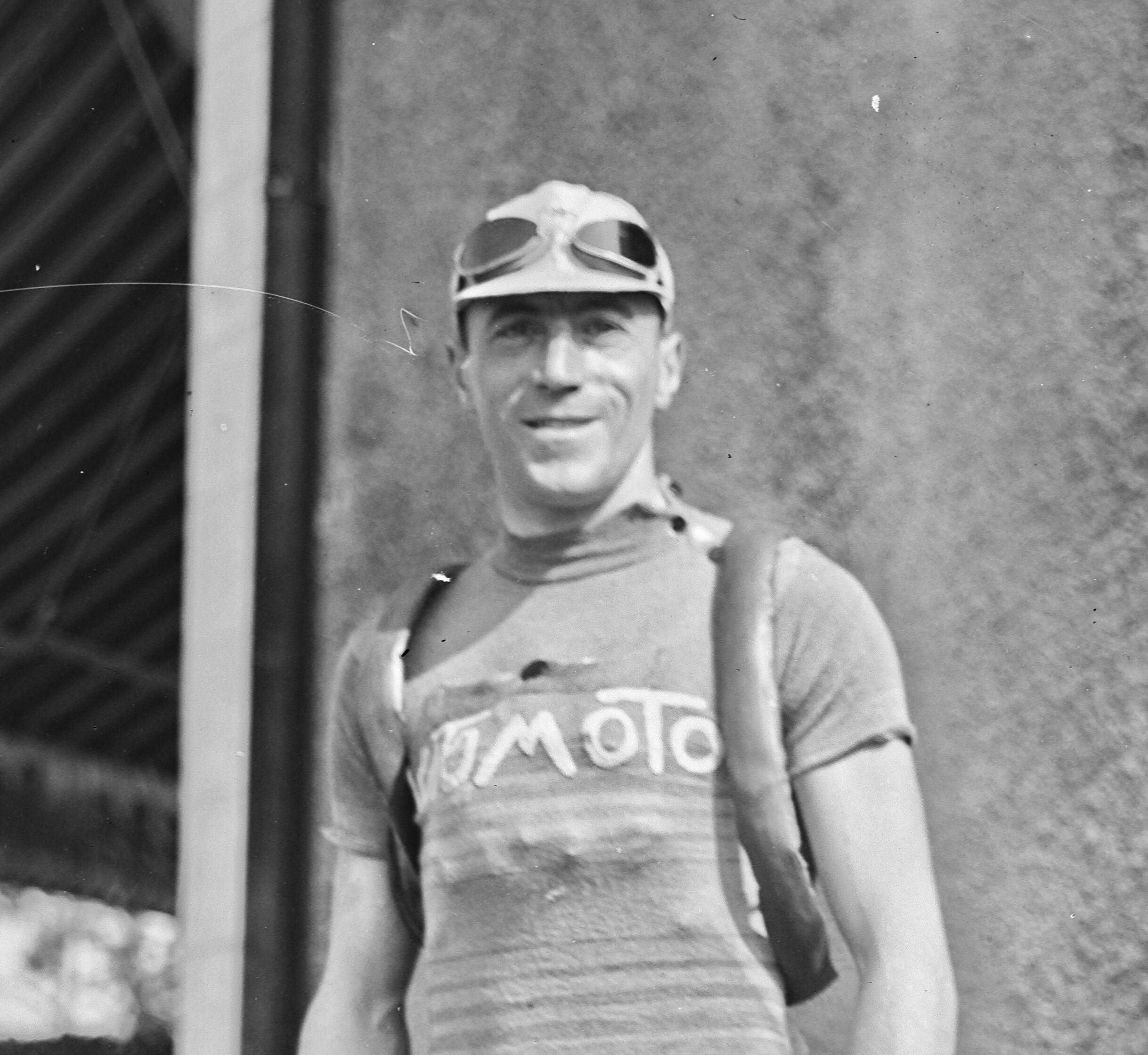
- Georges Cuvelier

Personal information
- Born: 26 October 1895 Paris, France
- Died: May 7, 1974 Épinay-sur-Orge, France

Cycling career
- Sport: Cycling
- Discipline: Road
- Role: Rider

Georges Cuvelier (26 October 1895 – 7 May 1974) was a French racing cyclist. He rode in the 1923 Tour de France.
