= Léon Devos (cyclist) =

Belgian cyclist

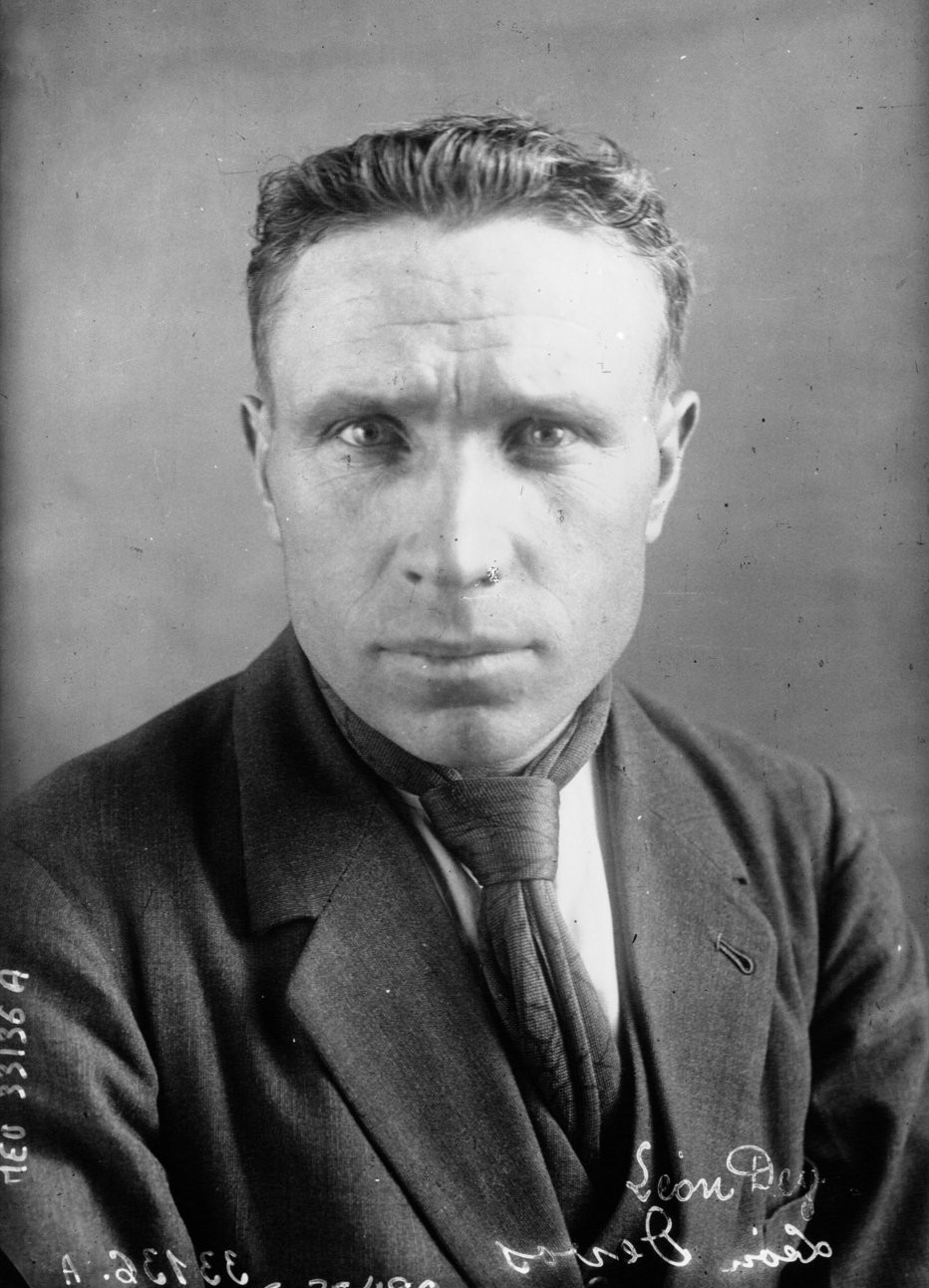
- Léon Devos in 1926

Personal information
- Born: 17 January 1896 Ardooie, Belgium
- Died: 23 August 1963 (aged 67)

Cycling career
- Sport: Cycling
- Discipline: Road
- Role: Rider

Major wins
- Tour of Flanders (1922)

Léon Devos (17 January 1896 – 23 August 1963) was a Belgian racing cyclist who won Liège–Bastogne–Liège in 1919 and the Tour of Flanders in 1922.

== Major results ==
1919
1st Liège–Bastogne–Liège
2nd Kampioenschap van Vlaanderen
1920
6th Liège–Bastogne–Liège
1922
1st Tour of Flanders
1923
3rd Arlon-Ostende
5th Liège–Bastogne–Liège
1924
1st Kampioenschap van Vlaanderen
1st De Drie Zustersteden
7th Paris-Roubaix
8th Liège–Bastogne–Liège
1925
2nd Overall Tour du Sud-Ouest

1st Stage 4

1926
2nd Overall Tour du Sud-Ouest

1st Stages 2, 3 and 7

1927
2nd GP Pascuas
3rd Circuit de la Vienne
