= 1926 Tour de France =

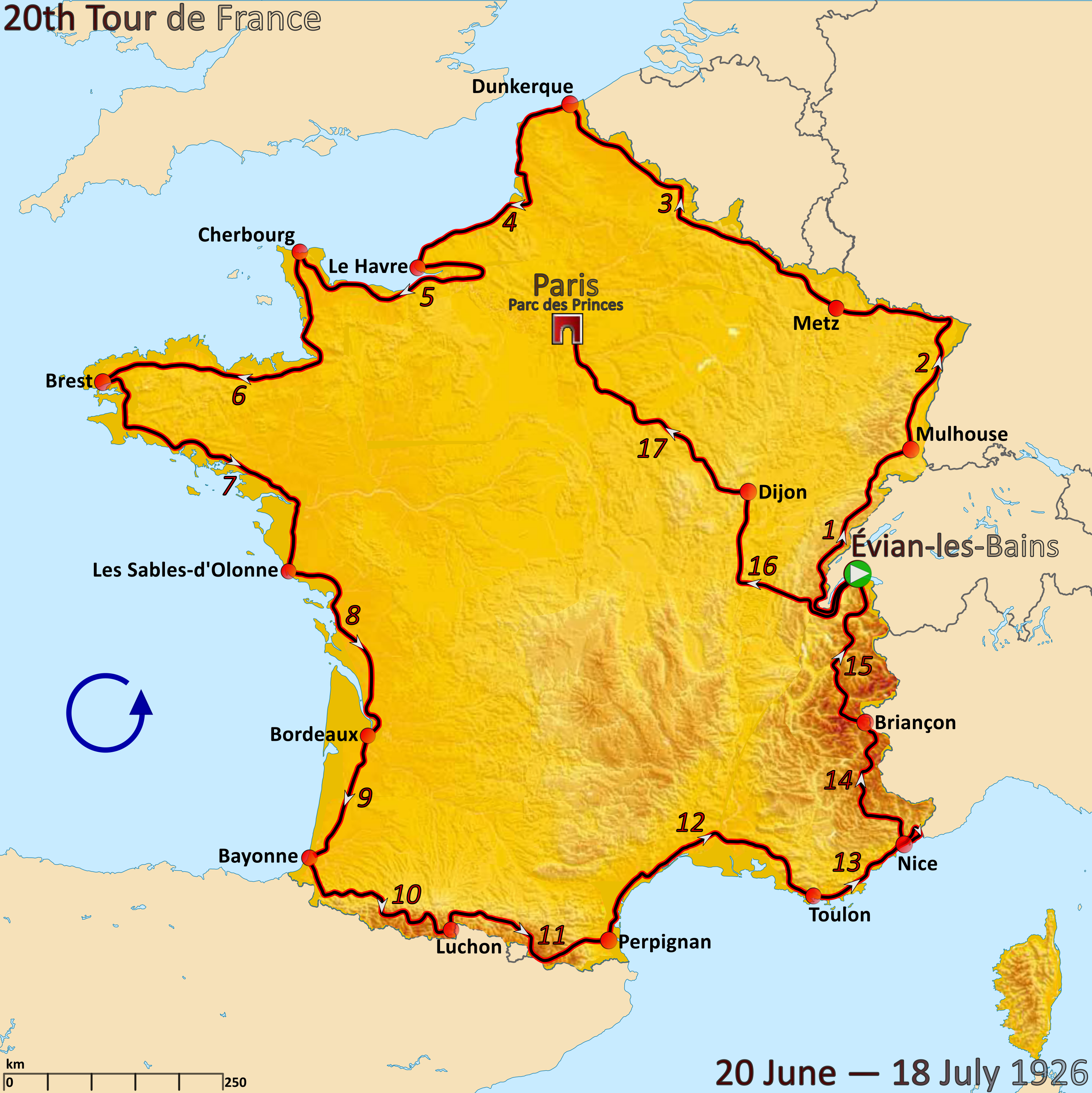
- Route of the 1926 Tour de France, starting in Evian, going counter-clockwise around France, and then to Paris

Race details
- Dates: 20 June – 18 July 1926
- Stages: 17
- Distance: 5,745 km (3,570 mi)
- Winning time: 238h 44' 25"

Results
Jersey awarded to the overall winner	Winner	Lucien Buysse (BEL)	(Automoto–Hutchinson)
	Second	Nicolas Frantz (LUX)	(Alcyon–Dunlop)
	Third	Bartolomeo Aymo (ITA)	(Alcyon–Dunlop)

The 1926 Tour de France was the 20th edition of the Tour de France, taking place from 20 June to 18 July. It consisted of 17 stages with a total distance of 5745 km, ridden at an average speed of 24.064 km/h.

The longest tour in history, the route traced closely the borders of France. It was the first time that the race started outside Paris; in this way riders were forced to climb the mountains in the east of the country twice, once at the beginning of the race, and again at the end. The race was won by Belgian cyclist Lucien Buysse.

== Innovations ==
In 1925, the number of stages had been increased from 15 (which was common since 1910) to 18 stages. In 1926, this was decreased to 17 stages. Tour organiser Henri Desgrange wanted to have longer stages, so the average stage length increased from 312 km per stage in 1925 to 338 km per stage in 1926.

== Teams ==
There were 126 cyclists who started the Tour de France; 82 of them were touriste-routiers, cyclists who did not have the support from a team. The other 44 cyclists started the race in teams; some teams only had two cyclists.

== Pre-race favourites ==
The two teams with favourites were Automoto and Alcyon. The Automoto team had Ottavio Bottecchia, the winner of the last two editions of the race, and Lucien Buysse, the runner-up of the previous edition. The Alcyon team had Bartolomeo Aymo and Nicolas Frantz, third and fourth in 1925. They also had Adelin Benoit, and the Tour organisation thought that the battle would be between Bottecchia and Benoit.

== Race overview ==
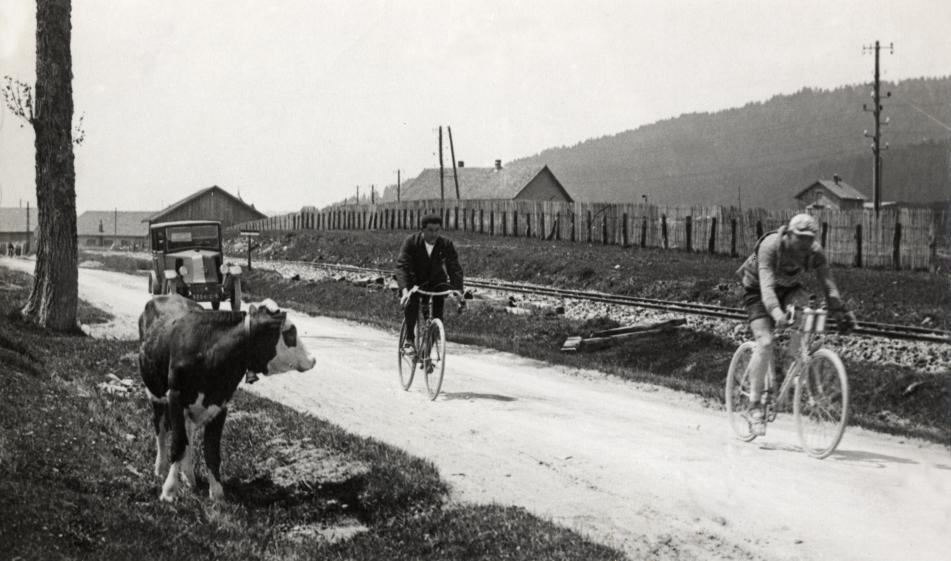
Jules Buysse leading, who will win the first stage (Evian to Mulhouse).

Jules Buysse started strong in the first stage, by finishing solo with a margin of more than 13 minutes. The second stage ended with a bunch sprint, so nothing changed in the general classification. In the third stage, he lost the lead to Gustaaf van Slembrouck. On that day, Lucien Buysse received the news that his daughter had died. He considered to leave the race, but decided to stay. The next stages all ended in bunch sprints, with all the favourites in the first group. In the sixth stage, Félix Sellier won the sprint. However, the jury decided that he had not sprinted according to the rules, and he was set back to second place, making Joseph van Dam the winner.

The battle for the general classification seriously began in the tenth stage. That tenth stage was a tough stage, and has been labeled as the toughest stage ever in the Tour de France; 76 cyclists started the race at midnight, and more than seventeen hours later, Lucien Buysse arrived as the winner. After twenty-five minutes, the next cyclist came in. After one hour, only 10 cyclists had finished, so the Tour de France organisation sent cars to look for the cyclists. At midnight, 47 cyclists had arrived, some of them in buses. The race officials decided to allow the cyclists 40% more time than the winning cyclist. Later that night, 54 cyclists had crossed the finish line, and the remaining 22 cyclists were gathered; they were no longer in the race. After the stage, the race officials were approached by a man who claimed that he had brought some cyclists to the finish line with his car, but that the cyclists had not paid him. The officials decided not to punish the cyclists, and paid the driver. Gustaaf Van Slembrouck, wearing the yellow jersey as leader of the general classification, officially finished in 20th place, two hours behind Buysse. Year later, Van Slembrouck said that during the stage he had said to Tour organiser Desgrange that he was giving up, and Desgrange ordered a car to bring Van Slembrouck to the finish. The same stage with the same mountains had also been in the 1913 Tour de France; then the weather was better, and winner Philippe Thys only took 13 hours to finish the stage. One of the cyclists who had not finished the stage was the defending champion, Ottavio Bottecchia.

When Buysse also won the next stage, his victory was assured, as he was leading by more than one hour. From that moment, Buysse saved his energy, and the race continued for the second place between Frantz and Aimo. At the end of the race, Frantz was in second place, only 26 seconds before Aimo.

== Results ==
In each stage, all cyclists started together. The cyclist who reached the finish first, was the winner of the stage. The time that each cyclist required to finish the stage was recorded. For the general classification, these times were added up; the cyclist with the least accumulated time was the race leader, identified by the yellow jersey.

=== Stage winners ===
In 1926, there were no French stage winners. This was the first time that this happened, and has since only happened again in 1999 and 2026.

Stage characteristics and winners
Stage	Date	Course	Distance	Type (Note: There was no distinction in the rules between plain stages and mountain stages; the icons shown here indicate which stages included mountains.)	Winner	Race leader
1	20 June	Evian to Mülhausen	373 km (232 mi)	Plain stage	Jules Buysse (BEL)	Jules Buysse (BEL)
2	22 June	Mülhausen to Metz	334 km (208 mi)	Plain stage	Aimé Dossche (BEL)	Jules Buysse (BEL)
3	24 June	Metz to Dunkerque	433 km (269 mi)	Plain stage	Gustaaf van Slembrouck (BEL)	Gustaaf van Slembrouck (BEL)
4	26 June	Dunkerque to Le Havre	361 km (224 mi)	Plain stage	Félix Sellier (BEL)	Gustaaf van Slembrouck (BEL)
5	28 June	Le Havre to Cherbourg-en-Cotentin	357 km (222 mi)	Plain stage	Adelin Benoit (BEL)	Gustaaf van Slembrouck (BEL)
6	30 June	Cherbourg to Brest	405 km (252 mi)	Plain stage	Joseph van Dam (BEL)	Gustaaf van Slembrouck (BEL)
7	2 July	Brest to Les Sables d'Olonne	412 km (256 mi)	Plain stage	Nicolas Frantz (LUX)	Gustaaf van Slembrouck (BEL)
8	3 July	Les Sables d'Olonne to Bordeaux	285 km (177 mi)	Plain stage	Joseph van Dam (BEL)	Gustaaf van Slembrouck (BEL)
9	4 July	Bordeaux to Bayonne	189 km (117 mi)	Plain stage	Nicolas Frantz (LUX)	Gustaaf van Slembrouck (BEL)
10	6 July	Bayonne to Luchon	326 km (203 mi)	Stage with mountain(s)	Lucien Buysse (BEL)	Lucien Buysse (BEL)
11	8 July	Luchon to Perpignan	323 km (201 mi)	Stage with mountain(s)	Lucien Buysse (BEL)	Lucien Buysse (BEL)
12	10 July	Perpignan to Toulon	427 km (265 mi)	Plain stage	Nicolas Frantz (LUX)	Lucien Buysse (BEL)
13	12 July	Toulon to Nice	280 km (170 mi)	Plain stage	Nicolas Frantz (LUX)	Lucien Buysse (BEL)
14	14 July	Nice to Briançon	275 km (171 mi)	Stage with mountain(s)	Bartolomeo Aimo (ITA)	Lucien Buysse (BEL)
15	16 July	Briançon to Evian	303 km (188 mi)	Stage with mountain(s)	Joseph van Dam (BEL)	Lucien Buysse (BEL)
16	17 July	Evian to Dijon	321 km (199 mi)	Plain stage	Camille van de Casteele (BEL)	Lucien Buysse (BEL)
17	18 July	Dijon to Paris	341 km (212 mi)	Plain stage	Aimé Dossche (BEL)	Lucien Buysse (BEL)
	Total		5,745 km (3,570 mi)			

=== General classification ===
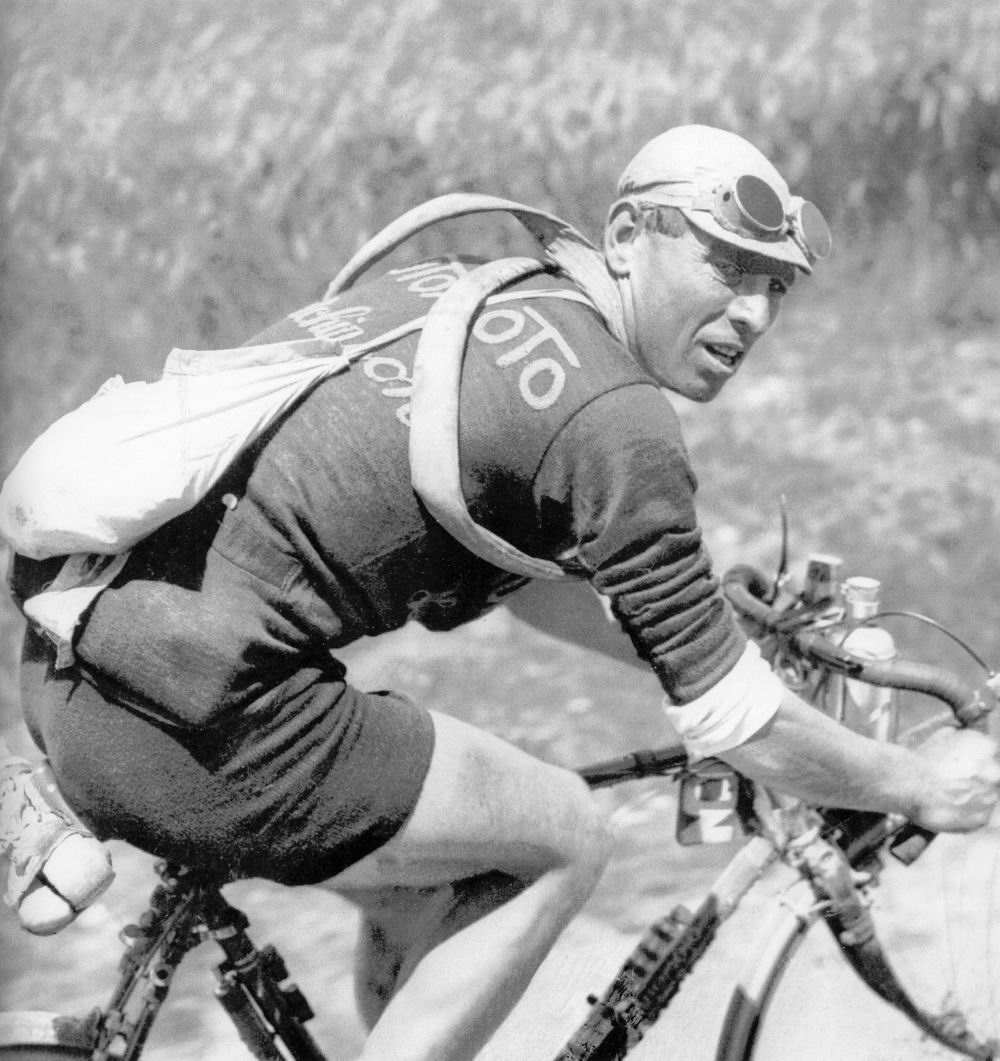
Lucien Buysse, the winner of the 1926 Tour de France.

The race was won by Belgian Lucien Buysse.

Final general classification (1–10)
Rank	Rider	Sponsor	Time
1	Lucien Buysse (BEL)	Automoto–Hutchinson	238h 44' 25"
2	Nicolas Frantz (LUX)	Alcyon–Dunlop	+1h 22' 25"
3	Bartolomeo Aimo (ITA)	Alcyon–Dunlop	+1h 22' 51"
4	Théophile Beeckman (BEL)	Armor–Dunlop	+1h 43' 54"
5	Félix Sellier (BEL)	Alcyon–Dunlop	+1h 49' 13"
6	Albert Dejonghe (BEL)	J.B. Louvet – Wolber	+1h 56' 15"
7	Léon Parmentier (BEL)	Jean Louvet – Hutchinson	+2h 09' 20"
8	Georges Cuvelier (FRA)	Meteore–Wolber	+2h 28' 32"
9	Jules Buysse (BEL)	Automoto–Hutchinson	+2h 37' 03"
10	Marcel Bidot (FRA)	Thomann–Dunlop	+2h 53' 54"

Final general classification (11–41)
Rank	Rider	Sponsor	Time
11	Odile Tailleu (BEL)	J.B. Louvet – Wolber	+3h 09' 08"
12	Joseph Van Dam (BEL)	Automoto–Hutchinson	+4h 00' 35"
13	Omer Huyse (BEL)	Automoto–Hutchinson	+4h 07' 24"
14	Camille Van de Casteele (BEL)	J.B. Louvet – Wolber	+4h 28' 19"
15	Aimé Dossche (BEL)	Christophe–Hutchinson	+5h 23' 19"
16	Emile Hardy (BEL)	Christophe–Hutchinson	+6h 02' 20"
17	Raymond Englebert (BEL)	Alcyon–Dunlop	+6h 03' 10"
18	Henri Colle (SUI)	Jean Louvet – Hutchinson	+7h 10' 35"
19	Georges Detreille (FRA)	Meteore–Wolber	+7h 48' 17"
20	Omer Vermeulen (BEL)	Meteore–Wolber	+7h 49' 44"
21	Giovanni Rossignoli (ITA)	—	+8h 23' 29"
22	Alfons Standaert (BEL)	Armor–Dunlop	+9h 37' 02"
23	Benoit Faure (FRA)	Meteore–Wolber	+9h 35' 44"
24	Henri Touzard (FRA)	—	+9h 36' 34"
25	Léon Devos (BEL)	Thomann–Dunlop	+10h 05' 23"
26	Jan Mertens (BEL)	Labor–Dunlop	+10h 27' 05"
27	Paul Duboc (FRA)	—	+10h 30' 47"
28	Louis Delannoy (BEL)	Labor–Dunlop	+10h 41' 09"
29	Eugène Dhers (FRA)	—	+11h 26' 16"
30	Carlo Longoni (ITA)	—	+11h 50' 56"
31	Charles Martinet (SUI)	—	+12h 56' 13"
32	Fernand Saive (BEL)	Meteore–Wolber	+13h 59' 59"
33	Maurice Arnoult (FRA)	—	+14h 24' 52"
34	Henri Catelan (FRA)	—	+15h 53' 32"
35	Mosé Arosio (ITA)	—	+17h 12' 30"
36	Fernand Moulet (FRA)	Meteore–Wolber	+18h 00' 43"
37	Alfred Francini (ITA)	—	+18h 18' 25"
38	Edouard Teisseire (FRA)	—	+19h 14' 17"
39	Henri Ferrara (FRA)	—	+21h 00' 22"
40	Jules Gillard (SUI)	—	+22h 47' 44"
41	André Drobecq (FRA)	—	+24h 59' 03"

== Other classifications ==
The race for touriste-routiers, cyclists who did not belong to a team and were allowed no assistance, was won by Italian Rossignoli.

The organising newspaper, l'Auto named a meilleur grimpeur (best climber), an unofficial precursor to the modern King of the Mountains competition. This award was won by Lucien Buysse.

== Aftermath ==
Lucien Buysse announced after his win that he expected to win again in 1927, but because his sponsor Automoto had financial problems, they could not send a team to the Tours of 1927 and 1928, and Buysse only returned in 1929. Lucien Buysse would never finish the Tour de France again. The winner of the previous edition, Bottecchia, said that he would retire from cycling, after the difficulties he faced in the 1926 Tour de France.

The Tour de France organisation did not like the outcome of the 1926 Tour de France, as 10 of the 17 stages had finished in bunch sprints. For the next year, the rules were changed, and the flat stages were run as team time trials.

== Bibliography ==
- Augendre, Jacques (2016). Guide historique [Historical guide] (PDF) (in French). Paris: Amaury Sport Organisation. Archived (PDF) from the original on 17 August 2016.
- McGann, Bill; McGann, Carol (2006). The Story of the Tour de France: 1903–1964. Vol. 1. Indianapolis, IN: Dog Ear Publishing. ISBN 978-1-59858-180-5.
