= Six Days of Brussels =

Cycling race

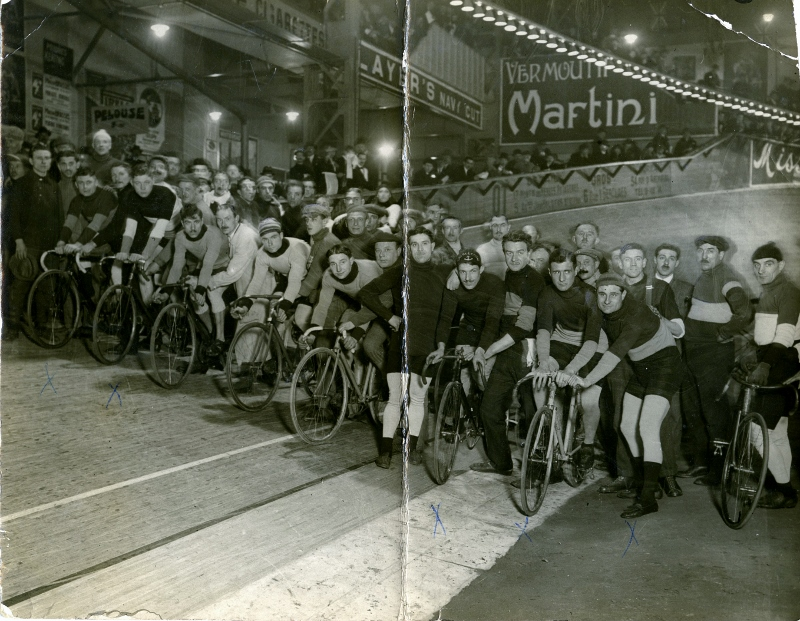
- Group picture at the start of the 1921 edition

Race details
- Region: Brussels, Belgium
- Discipline: Track
- Type: Six-day racing

History
- First edition: 1912
- Editions: 46 (as of 1971)
- Final edition: 1971
- First winner: Alfred Hill (USA); Eddy Root (USA)
- Most wins: Rik Van Steenbergen (BEL) (8 wins)
- Final winner: Albert Fritz (RFA); Sigi Renz (RFA)

The Six Days of Brussels was a six-day track cycling race held annually in Brussels, Belgium.

Rik Van Steenbergen holds the record of victories, winning 8 times.

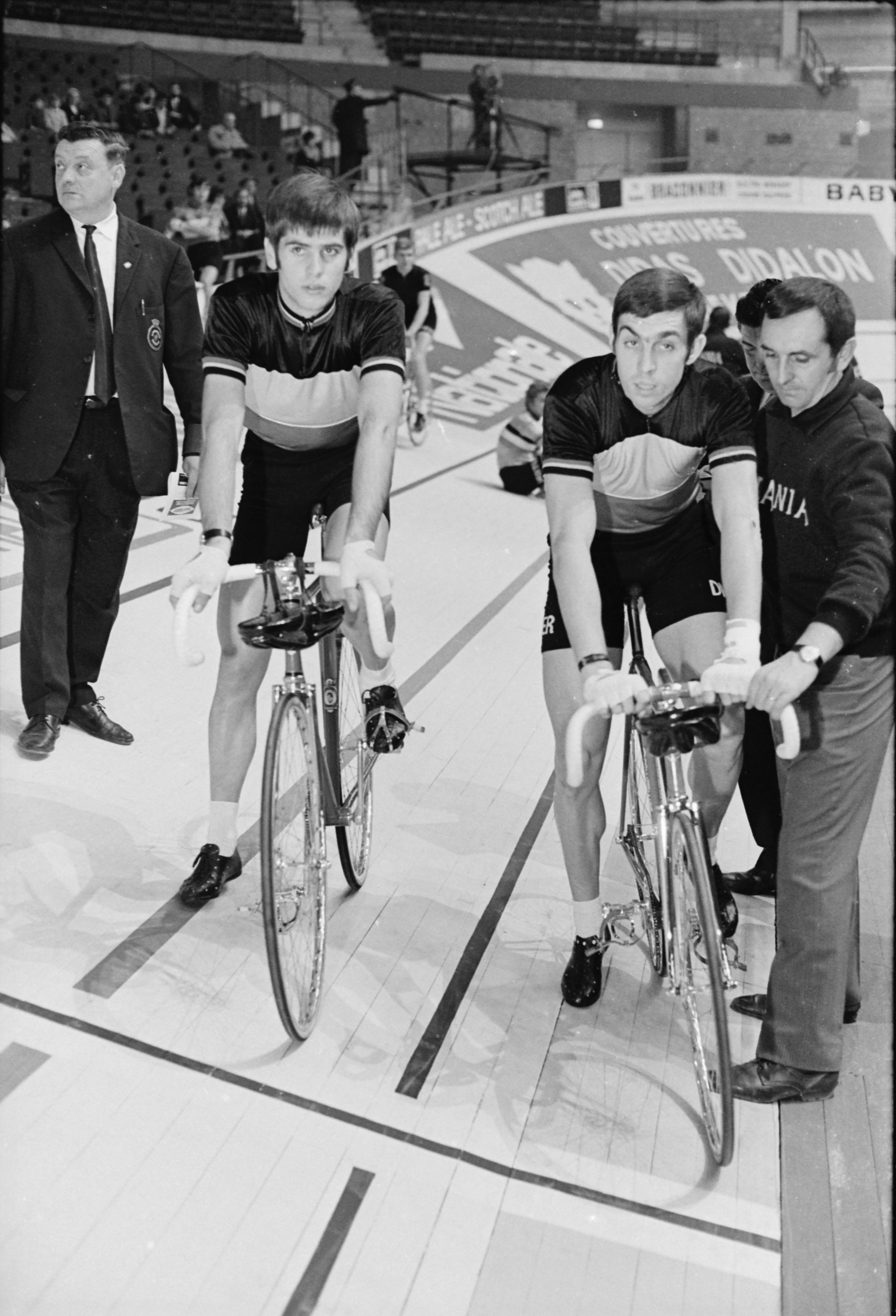
Jean-Pierre Monseré and Patrick Sercu during the 1970 Six Days of Brussels

== Winners ==
Year	Winner	Second	Third
1912	(United States) Alfred Hill (United States) Eddy Root	(Belgium) Cyrille Van Hauwaert (Belgium) Arthur Vanderstuyft	(United States) Elmer Collins (United States) Peter Drobach
1913	(Belgium) René Vandenberghe (France) Octave Lapize	(France) Léon Comès (France) Lucien Petit-Breton	(France) Charles Charron (Belgium) Michel Debaets
1914	(Belgium) Cyrille Van Hauwaert (Netherlands) John Stol	(France) Jules Miquel (France) Octave Lapize	(Australia) Reginald McNamara (United States) Jimmy Moran
1915	(Belgium) Cyrille Van Hauwaert (Belgium) Joseph Van Bever	(Belgium) Alfons Spiessens (Belgium) René Vandenberghe	(Belgium) Marcel Buysse (Belgium) Pierre Van De Velde
1916-1918	No race		
1919	(France) Marcel Dupuy (Belgium) Philippe Thys	(Belgium) Alfons Spiessens (Belgium) Émile Aerts	(Belgium) Aloïs Persyn (Belgium) Pierre Van De Velde
1920	(Belgium) Marcel Buysse (Belgium) Alfons Spiessens	(Belgium) Marcel Berthet (Belgium) Charles Deruyter	(Belgium) Henri Van Lerberghe (Belgium) Émile Aerts
1921	(Belgium) Marcel Berthet (Belgium) Charles Deruyter	(Belgium) Alfons Spiessens (Belgium) Émile Aerts	(Belgium) Albert Desmedt (Belgium) Jos Van Bever
1922	(Netherlands) Piet van Kempen (Belgium) Émile Aerts	(Belgium) Louis Eyckmans (Belgium) Pierre Rielens	(Belgium) Henri Wynsdau (Belgium) Théo Wynsdau
1923	(Belgium) César Debaets (Belgium) Jules Van Hevel	(Netherlands) Piet van Kempen (Belgium) Émile Aerts	(Belgium) Maurice Dewolf (Belgium) John Van Ruysseveldt
1924	(Belgium) Pierre Rielens (Belgium) Émile Aerts	(Belgium) Alfons Goossens (Belgium) Victor Standaert	(Belgium) Julien Delbecque (Belgium) Jules Verschelden
1925	(Netherlands) Piet van Kempen (Belgium) Émile Aerts	(Australia) Alfred Grenda (Australia) Alec McBeath	(Belgium) Maurice Dewolf (Belgium) Philippe Thys
1926	(Netherlands) Piet van Kempen (Netherlands) Klaas van Nek	(Belgium) Aloïs Degraeve (Belgium) Emile Thollembeeck	(Belgium) Aloïs Persyn (Belgium) Jules Verschelden
1927	(Belgium) Pierre Rielens (Belgium) René Vermandel	(Belgium) Adolphe Charlier (Belgium) Henri Duray	(Belgium) Hilaire Hellebaut (Belgium) Frans Roels
1928	(Belgium) Henri Duray (Belgium) Félix Sellier	(Belgium) Alfons Standaert (Belgium) Victor Standaert	(Belgium) César Debaets (Belgium) Henri Stockelynck
1929	(Belgium) Ferdinand Goris (Belgium) Armand Haesendonck	(Belgium) Roger De Neef (Belgium) Albert Desmedt	(Belgium) Alfons Standaert (Belgium) Victor Standaert
1930	(Netherlands) Piet van Kempen (Belgium) Paul Buschenhagen	(Belgium) René Vermandel (Belgium) Joseph Wauters	(Belgium) Pierre Rielens (Belgium) Michel Van Vlockhoven
1931	(Belgium) Roger Deneef (Belgium) Adolphe Charlier	(Netherlands) Piet van Kempen (Belgium) Jules Van Hevel	(Italy) Arturo Bresciani (France) André Mouton
1932	(Netherlands) Jan Pijnenburg (Netherlands) Janus Braspennincx	(Belgium) Roger Deneef (Belgium) Adolphe Charlier	(Belgium) Henri Aerts (Belgium) Armand Haesendonck
1933	(Netherlands) Jan Pijnenburg (Germany) Adolf Schön	(Belgium) Roger Deneef (Belgium) Adolphe Charlier	(Switzerland) Emil Richli (France) Georges Wambst
1934	(Netherlands) Jan Pijnenburg (Netherlands) Cor Wals	(Switzerland) Emil Richli (Germany) Adolf Schön	(Belgium) Adolphe Charlier (Belgium) Gerard Loncke
1935	(Belgium) Roger Deneef (Belgium) Adolphe Charlier	(Netherlands) Jan Pijnenburg (Netherlands) Cor Wals	(Belgium) Albert Buysse (France) Antonin Magne
1936	(Belgium) Albert Buysse (Belgium) Albert Billiet	(Belgium) Roger Deneef (Belgium) Adolphe Charlier	(Belgium) Jean Aerts (Germany) Adolf Schön
1937	(Belgium) Jean Aerts (Belgium) Omer De Bruycker	(Belgium) Roger Deneef (Germany) Adolf Schön	(Italy) Learco Guerra (Italy) Giuseppe Olmo
1938	No race		
1939	(Netherlands) Kees Pellenaars (Netherlands) Frans Slaats	(Belgium) Albert Buysse (Belgium) Albert Billiet	(Belgium) Omer De Bruycker (Belgium) Karel Kaers
1940	(Belgium) Omer De Bruycker (Belgium) Karel Kaers	(Belgium) Achiel Bruneel (Belgium) Jef Scherens	(Belgium) Robert Naeye (Belgium) Adelin Van Simaeys
1941-1946	No race		
1947	(Netherlands) Gerrit Schulte (Netherlands) Gerrit Boeyen	(Belgium) Maurice Depauw jr (Belgium) Ernest Thyssen	(Belgium) Kamiel Dekuysscher (Belgium) Fernand Spelte
1948	(Belgium) Rik Van Steenbergen (Belgium) Marcel Kint	(Belgium) Achiel Bruneel (Belgium) Kamiel Dekuysscher	(Belgium) Lucien Acou (Belgium) Robert Fruythof
1949	(Belgium) Rik Van Steenbergen (Belgium) Marcel Kint	(Netherlands) Gerrit Schulte (Netherlands) Gerrit Peters	(Belgium) Valere Ollivier (Belgium) Ernest Thyssen
1950	(Belgium) Jos De Beuckelaer (Belgium) Achiel Bruneel	(Netherlands) Gerrit Schulte (Netherlands) Gerrit Peters	(Belgium) Albert Ramon (Belgium) Ernest Thyssen
1951	(Belgium) Rik Van Steenbergen (Belgium) Stan Ockers	(Belgium) Robert Naeye (Belgium) Ernest Thyssen	(Belgium) Valere Ollivier (Belgium) Gerard Buyl
1952	(Belgium) Lucien Acou (Belgium) Achiel Bruneel	(Luxembourg) Lucien Gillen (France) Georges Senfftleben	(France) Émile Carrara (France) Dominique Forlini
1953	(Switzerland) Hugo Koblet (Switzerland) Armin von Büren	(Netherlands) Gerrit Schulte (Netherlands) Gerrit Peters	(Belgium) Rik Van Steenbergen (Belgium) Stan Ockers
1954	(France) Georges Senfftleben (France) Dominique Forlini	(Belgium) Rik Van Steenbergen (Belgium) Stan Ockers	(Netherlands) Gerrit Schulte (Netherlands) Gerrit Peters
1955	(Belgium) Rik Van Steenbergen (Belgium) Emile Severeyns	(Belgium) Jean Brankart (Belgium) Stan Ockers	(Netherlands) Gerrit Schulte (Netherlands) Gerrit Peters
1956	(Belgium) Rik Van Steenbergen (Belgium) Emile Severeyns	(Belgium) Willy Lauwers (Belgium) Arsene Rijckaert	(Belgium) Lucien Acou (Belgium) Rik Van Looy
1957	(Belgium) Willy Vannitsen (Belgium) Rik Van Looy	(France) Georges Senfftleben (France) Dominique Forlini	(Belgium) Rik Van Steenbergen (Belgium) Emile Severeyns
1958	(Belgium) Rik Van Steenbergen (Belgium) Emile Severeyns	(Australia) Reginald Arnold (Belgium) Fred De Bruyne	(Netherlands) Gerrit Schulte (Belgium) Jean Brankart
1959	(Netherlands) Gerrit Schulte (Netherlands) Peter Post	(Belgium) Rik Van Steenbergen (Belgium) Emile Severeyns	(West Germany) Klaus Bugdahl (Italy) Ferdinando Terruzzi
1960	(Belgium) Rik Van Steenbergen (Belgium) Emile Severeyns	(Belgium) Rik Van Looy (Netherlands) Peter Post	(Belgium) Emile Daems (Belgium) Willy Vannitsen
1961	(Belgium) Rik Van Looy (Netherlands) Peter Post	(Belgium) Rik Van Steenbergen (Belgium) Emile Severeyns	(West Germany) Klaus Bugdahl (Switzerland) Fritz Pfenninger
1962	(Belgium) Rik Van Steenbergen (Denmark) Palle Lykke	(Netherlands) Peter Post (Belgium) Willy Vannitsen	(Belgium) Emile Daems (Belgium) Emile Severeyns
1963	(Netherlands) Peter Post (Switzerland) Fritz Pfenninger	(Belgium) Rik Van Steenbergen (Denmark) Palle Lykke	(Belgium) Rik Van Looy (Belgium) Hugo Scrayen
1964	(Netherlands) Peter Post (Switzerland) Fritz Pfenninger	(Belgium) Rik Van Steenbergen (Denmark) Palle Lykke	(Belgium) Robert Lelangue (Belgium) Theo Verschueren
1965	(Netherlands) Peter Post (United Kingdom) Tom Simpson	(Belgium) Eddy Merckx (Belgium) Patrick Sercu	(Belgium) Rik Van Steenbergen (Denmark) Palle Lykke
1966-1969	No race		
1970	(Netherlands) Peter Post (France) Jacques Mourioux	(Belgium) Ferdinand Bracke (Belgium) Norbert Seeuws	(Belgium) Julien Stevens (Belgium) Noel Van Clooster
1971	(West Germany) Albert Fritz (West Germany) Sigi Renz	(Belgium) Roger De Vlaeminck (Belgium) Patrick Sercu	(Belgium) Ferdinand Bracke (Netherlands) Peter Post
