= Six Days of Antwerp =

Cycling race

- Poster to the 1972 edition

Race details
- Region: Antwerp, Belgium
- Discipline: Track
- Type: Six-day racing

History
- First edition: 1934
- Editions: 52 (as of 1994)
- Final edition: 1994
- First winner: Jan Pijnenburg (NED); Cor Wals (NED)
- Most wins: Peter Post (NED) (11 wins)
- Final winner: Etienne De Wilde (BEL); Jens Veggerby (DEN)

The Six Days of Antwerp was a six-day track cycling race held annually in Antwerp, Belgium.

The Six Days has seen 55 editions, was organized from 1934 with interruptions during World War II and the years 1984 to 1986 and last held in 1994.

The Six Days of Antwerp was held at the Antwerp Sportpaleis in Merksem on a wooden indoor track, initially 132m long, after a reconstruction in 1968 it was given a length of 250m.

Record winner is Peter Post with 11 victories, five of them in consecutive years.

== Winners ==
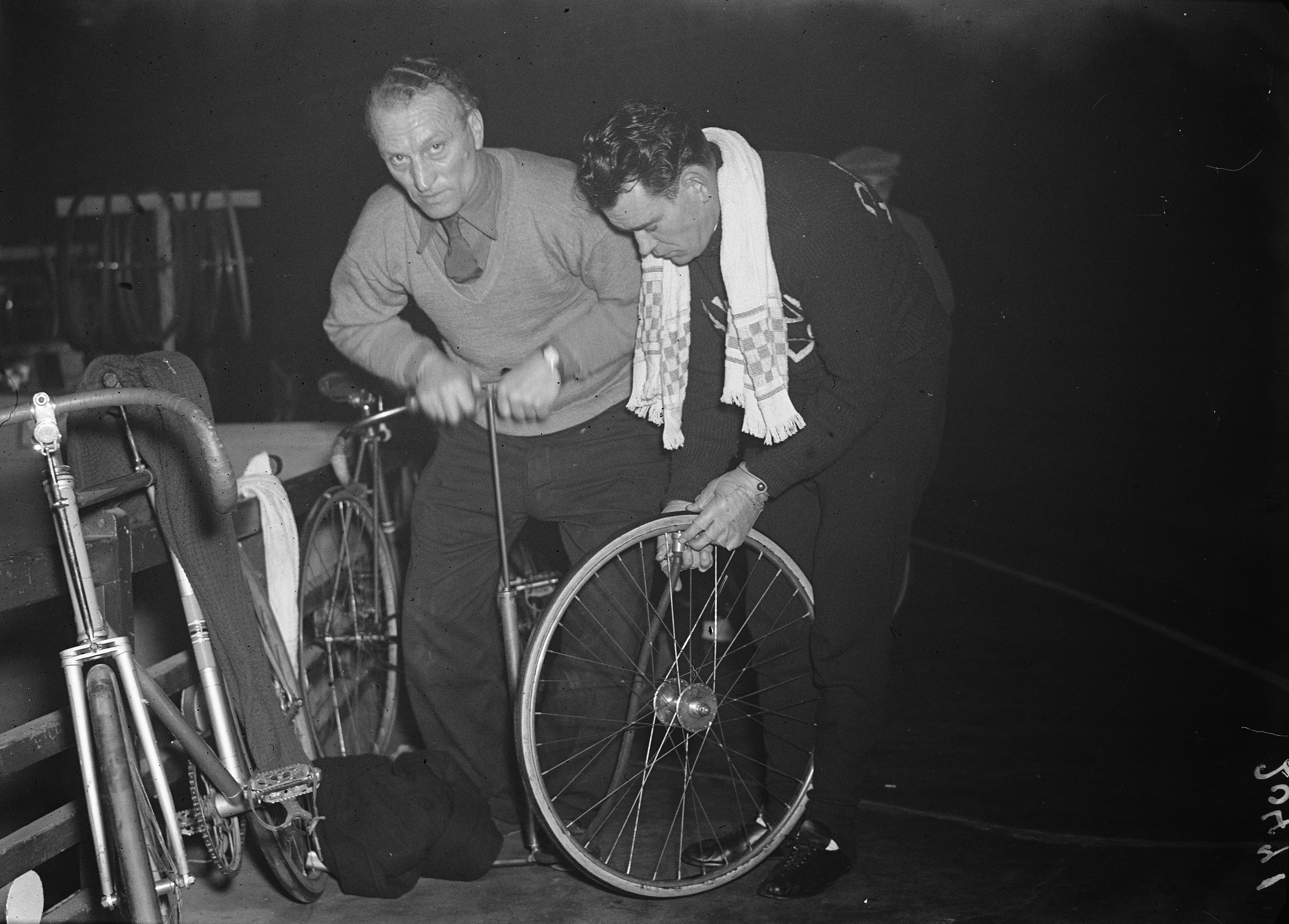
Kees Pellenaars changes a wheel during the 1947 Six Days of Antwerp

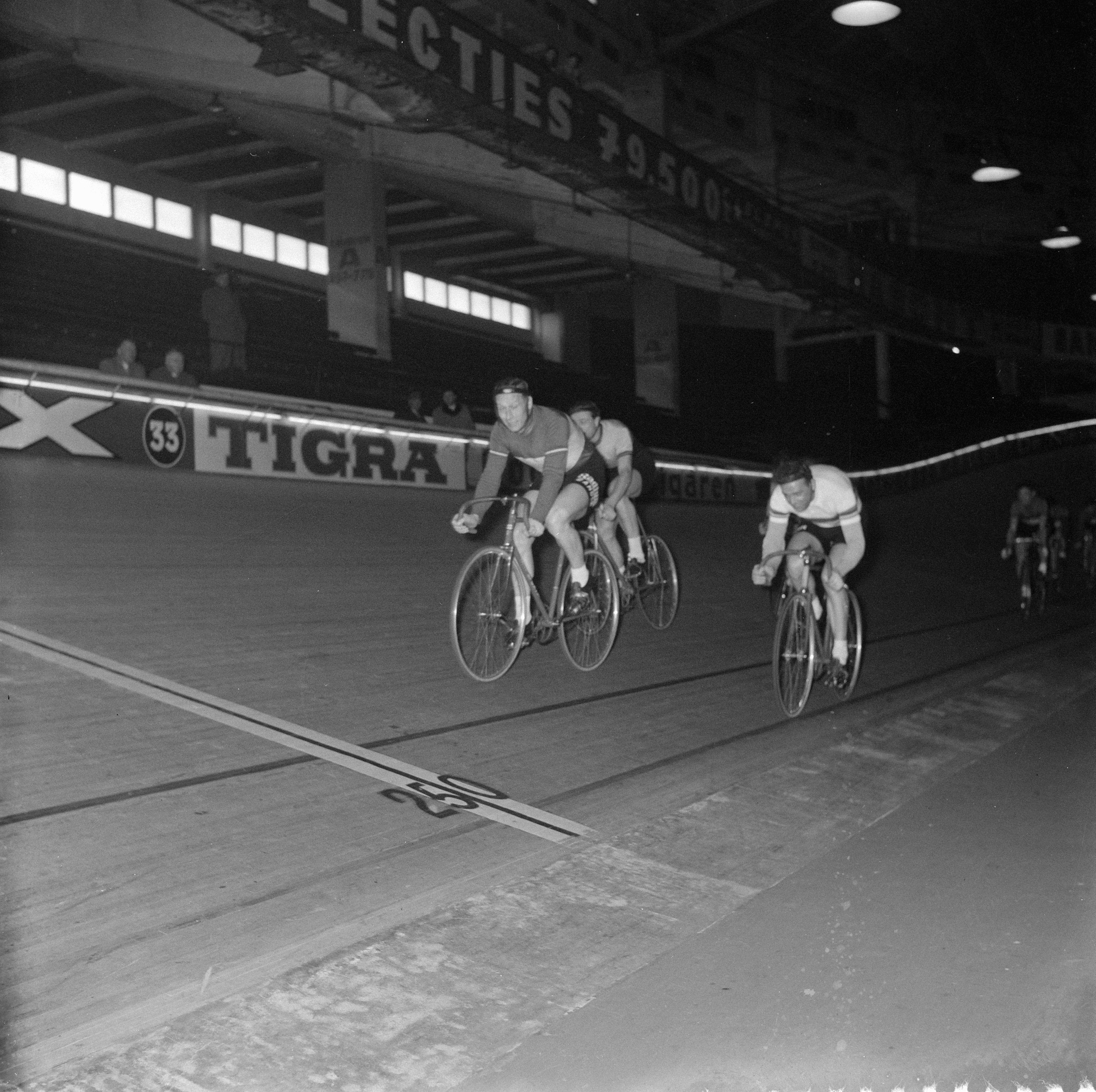
Jan Derksen (center) with Rik Van Steenbergen (right) in the 1958 Six Days of Antwerp

Year	Winner	Second	Third
1934	(Netherlands) Jan Pijnenburg (Netherlands) Cor Wals	(Belgium) Albert Buysse (Belgium) Roger Deneef	(Switzerland) Emil Richli (Germany) Adolf Schön
1935	(Italy) Learco Guerra (Belgium) Adolf Van Nevele	(Belgium) René Martin (Belgium) Dieudonné Smets	(Belgium) Frans Bonduel (Belgium) Constant Huys
1936	(Belgium) Kamiel Dekuysscher (Belgium) Roger Deneef	(France) Adolphe Charlier (Belgium) Maurice Depauw	(Belgium) Georges Ronsse (Germany) Adolf Schön
1937	(Netherlands) Jan Pijnenburg (Netherlands) Frans Slaats	(Belgium) Albert Billiet (Belgium) Albert Buysse	(Belgium) Maurice Depauw (Belgium) Georges Ronsse
1938	(Belgium) Albert Billiet (Belgium) Albert Buysse	(Netherlands) Cees Pellenaars (Netherlands) Frans Slaats	(Netherlands) Jan Pijnenburg (Netherlands) Cor Wals
1939	(Belgium) Albert Billiet (Belgium) Albert Buysse	(Netherlands) Gerrit Boeyen (Netherlands) Cor Wals	(Belgium) Karel Kaers (Belgium) Omer De Bruycker
1940	(Netherlands) Gerrit Boeyen (Netherlands) Gerrit Schulte	(Belgium) Achiel Bruneel (Belgium) Roger Deneef	(Belgium) Robert Naeye (Belgium) Adelin Van Simaeys
1941– 1946	No race		
1947	(Belgium) Achiel Bruneel (Belgium) Omer De Bruycker	(Netherlands) Gerrit Boeyen (Netherlands) Gerrit Schulte	(France) Guy Lapébie (Belgium) Arthur Sérès
1948	(Belgium) René Adriaenssens; Albert Bruylandt	(Belgium) Maurice Depauw (Belgium) Edward Thyssen	(Belgium) Stan Ockers (Belgium) Rik Van Steenbergen
1949	(Netherlands) Gerrit Boeyen (Netherlands) Gerrit Schulte	(Netherlands) Cees Pellenaars (Netherlands) Gerrit Peters	(Belgium) Maurice Depauw jr. (Belgium) Robert Naeye
1950	(Belgium) Achiel Bruneel (Belgium) Rik Van Steenbergen	(Netherlands) Gerrit Peters (Netherlands) Gerrit Schulte	(Belgium) Edward Thyssen (Netherlands) Arie van Vliet
1951	(Australia) Reginald Arnold (Australia) Alfred Strom	(Belgium) René Adriaenssens (Belgium) Albert Bruylandt	(Belgium) Achiel Bruneel (Belgium) Josef De Beuckelaer
1952	(Australia) Reginald Arnold (Australia) Alfred Strom	(Belgium) Achiel Bruneel (Belgium) Rik Van Steenbergen	(Netherlands) Gerrit Peters (Netherlands) Gerrit Schulte
1953	(Belgium) Achiel Bruneel (Switzerland) Oskar Plattner	(Netherlands) Gerrit Peters (Netherlands) Gerrit Schulte	(France) Dominique Forlini (Italy) Ferdinando Terruzzi
1954	(Netherlands) Gerrit Peters (Netherlands) Gerrit Schulte	(Switzerland) Oskar Plattner (Switzerland) Armin Von Büren	(Belgium) Stan Ockers (Belgium) Rik Van Steenbergen
1955	(Belgium) Stan Ockers (Belgium) Rik Van Steenbergen	(Netherlands) Gerrit Peters (Netherlands) Gerrit Schulte	(Switzerland) Walter Bucher (Switzerland) Jean Roth
1956	(Australia) Reginald Arnold (Belgium) Stan Ockers (Switzerland) Jean Roth	(Belgium) Arsène Rijckaert (Belgium) Emiel Severeyns (Belgium) Rik Van Steenbergen	(Netherlands) Jan Derksen (Netherlands) Gerrit Peters (Netherlands) Gerrit Schulte
1957	(Australia) Reginald Arnold (Belgium) Willy Lauwers (Italy) Ferdinando Terruzzi	(Luxembourg) Lucien Gillen (Netherlands) Gerrit Schulte (Switzerland) Armin Von Büren	(Belgium) Emiel Severeyns (Belgium) Willy Vannitsen (Belgium) Rik Van Steenbergen
1958	(Australia) Reginald Arnold (Belgium) Emiel Severeyns (Belgium) Rik Van Steenbergen	(West Germany) Klaus Bugdahl (Switzerland) Jean Roth (Netherlands) Gerrit Schulte	(Netherlands) Jan Derksen (Netherlands) Wout Wagtmans (Netherlands) Wim van Est
1959 (I)	(West Germany) Klaus Bugdahl (Netherlands) Gerrit Schulte (Netherlands) Peter Post	(Australia) Reginald Arnold (Belgium) Paul Depaepe (Italy) Ferdinando Terruzzi	(Belgium) Emiel Severeyns (Belgium) Rik Van Steenbergen (Belgium) Willy Lauwers
1959 (II)	(Netherlands) Jo de Roo (Belgium) Jan Palmans	(Belgium) Maurice Joossen (Belgium) Jos Verachtert	(Belgium) August Peeters (Belgium) Leo Proost
1960	(Netherlands) Jan Plantaz (Netherlands) Peter Post (Netherlands) Gerrit Schulte	(Belgium) Léo Proost (Belgium) Emiel Severeyns (Belgium) Rik Van Steenbergen	(Denmark) Frans Aerenhouts (Australia) Reginald Arnold (Italy) Ferdinando Terruzzi
1961	(Netherlands) Peter Post (Belgium) Willy Vannitsen (Belgium) Rik Van Looy	(Belgium) Gilbert Maes (Belgium) Emiel Severeyns (Belgium) Rik Van Steenbergen	(Denmark) Palle Lykke Jensen (Denmark) Kay Werner Nielsen (Belgium) Léo Proost
1962	(Switzerland) Oscar Plattner (Netherlands) Peter Post (Belgium) Rik Van Looy	(Denmark) Palle Lykke Jensen (Belgium) Emiel Severeyns (Belgium) Rik Van Steenbergen	(Australia) Reginald Arnold (West Germany) Klaus Bugdahl (Switzerland) Fritz Pfenninger
1963	(Denmark) Palle Lykke Jensen (Belgium) Léo Proost (Belgium) Rik Van Steenbergen	(Australia) Reginald Arnold (Netherlands) Peter Post (Belgium) Willy Vannitsen	(West Germany) Klaus Bugdahl (Switzerland) Fritz Pfenninger (Belgium) Hugo Scrayen
1964	(Belgium) Noël Foré (Switzerland) Fritz Pfenninger (Netherlands) Peter Post	(Denmark) Palle Lykke Jensen (Belgium) Léo Proost (Belgium) Rik Van Steenbergen	(West Germany) Klaus Bugdahl (West Germany) Sigi Renz (Belgium) Hugo Scrayen
1965	(West Germany) Klaus Bugdahl (Netherlands) Jan Janssen (Netherlands) Peter Post	(Denmark) Freddy Eugen (Denmark) Palle Lykke Jensen (Belgium) Rik Van Steenbergen	(Belgium) Patrick Sercu (Belgium) Emiel Severeyns (Belgium) Théo Verschueren
1966	(Netherlands) Jan Janssen (Netherlands) Peter Post (Switzerland) Fritz Pfenninger	(West Germany) Klaus Bugdahl (Belgium) Eddy Merckx (Belgium) Patrick Sercu	(Australia) Ron Baensch (Belgium) Léo Proost (Belgium) Joseph Verachtert
1967	(Netherlands) Jan Janssen (Netherlands) Peter Post (Switzerland) Fritz Pfenninger	(West Germany) Klaus Bugdahl (Belgium) Eddy Merckx (Belgium) Patrick Sercu	(Belgium) Léo Proost (Belgium) Emiel Severeyns (United Kingdom) Tom Simpson
1968	(West Germany) Sigi Renz (Belgium) Emiel Severeyns (Belgium) Théo Verschueren	(Switzerland) Fritz Pfenninger (Netherlands) Peter Post (Netherlands) Rik Van Looy	(West Germany) Klaus Bugdahl (Netherlands) Jan Janssen (Belgium) Patrick Sercu
1969	(Netherlands) Peter Post (Belgium) Patrick Sercu (Belgium) Rik Van Looy	(Netherlands) Léo Duyndam (Switzerland) Fritz Pfenninger (Belgium) Léo Proost	(West Germany) Sigi Renz (Belgium) Emiel Severeyns (Belgium) Théo Verschueren
1970	(West Germany) Klaus Bugdahl (Netherlands) René Pijnen (Netherlands) Peter Post	(Belgium) Romain Deloof (Belgium) Patrick Sercu (France) Alain Van Lancker	(West Germany) Sigi Renz (Belgium) Théo Verschueren (Belgium) Rik Van Looy
1971	(Netherlands) Léo Duyndam (Netherlands) René Pijnen (Netherlands) Peter Post	(West Germany) Dieter Kemper (Belgium) Jean-Pierre Monséré (Belgium) Julien Stevens	(Belgium) Walter Godefroot (West Germany) Sigi Renz (Belgium) Théo Verschueren
1972	(Netherlands) Léo Duyndam (Netherlands) René Pijnen (Belgium) Théo Verschueren	(Belgium) Patrick Sercu (France) Alain Van Lancker (Belgium) Rik Van Linden	(Australia) Graeme Gilmore (West Germany) Wolfgang Schulze (Belgium) Julien Stevens
1973	(Netherlands) Léo Duyndam (Netherlands) Gérard Koel (Netherlands) René Pijnen	(West Germany) Klaus Bugdahl (Australia) Graeme Gilmore (France) Cyrille Guimard	(Belgium) Walter Godefroot (Belgium) Norbert Seeuws (Belgium) Théo Verschueren
1974	(Belgium) Eddy Merckx (Belgium) Patrick Sercu	(Netherlands) René Pijnen (Belgium) Rik Van Linden	(Netherlands) Léo Duyndam (Netherlands) Gerben Karstens
1975	(Belgium) Eddy Merckx (Belgium) Patrick Sercu	(Australia) Graeme Gilmore (Belgium) Julien Stevens	(Netherlands) René Pijnen (Belgium) Alain Van Lancker
1976	(Belgium) Eddy Merckx (Belgium) Patrick Sercu	(West Germany) Dieter Kemper (Belgium) Freddy Maertens	(Australia) Graeme Gilmore (Belgium) Rik Van Linden
1977	(Belgium) Freddy Maertens (Belgium) Patrick Sercu	(West Germany) Albert Fritz (Belgium) Marc Demeyer	(Netherlands) René Pijnen (Belgium) Rik Van Linden
1978	(Australia) Danny Clark (Belgium) Freddy Maertens	(Australia) Donald Allan (Netherlands) René Pijnen	(Liechtenstein) Roman Hermann (Belgium) Marc Demeyer
1979	(West Germany) Albert Fritz (Netherlands) René Pijnen (Netherlands) Michel Vaarten	(Belgium) Patrick Sercu (Belgium) Roger De Vlaeminck (Belgium) Rik Van Linden	(Belgium) Ferdinand Bracke (West Germany) Wilfried Peffgen (Belgium) Stan Tourné
1980	(West Germany) Wilfried Peffgen (Netherlands) René Pijnen (Belgium) Roger De Vlaeminck	(Australia) Donald Allan (Australia) Danny Clark (Belgium) Fons De Wolf	(Liechtenstein) Roman Hermann (West Germany) Horst Schütz (Belgium) Gery Verlinden
1981	(Netherlands) René Pijnen (Belgium) Fons De Wolf	(West Germany) Wilfried Peffgen (Belgium) Stan Tourné	(Liechtenstein) Roman Hermann (Netherlands) Michel Vaarten
1982	(Belgium) Patrick Sercu (Belgium) Roger De Vlaeminck	(Denmark) Gert Frank (Netherlands) René Pijnen	(Australia) Donald Allan (Belgium) Stan Tourné
1983	(Netherlands) René Pijnen (Belgium) Stan Tourné	(Belgium) Patrick Sercu (Belgium) Etienne De Wilde	(Liechtenstein) Roman Hermann (Netherlands) Michel Vaarten
1984– 1986	No race		
1987	(Australia) Danny Clark (Belgium) Etienne De Wilde	(Liechtenstein) Roman Hermann (Belgium) Stan Tourné	(United Kingdom) Anthony Doyle (Belgium) Eric Vanderaerden
1988	(Belgium) Stan Tourné (Belgium) Etienne De Wilde	(Australia) Danny Clark (Belgium) Roger Ilegems	(Italy) Adriano Baffi (United Kingdom) Anthony Doyle
1989	No race		
1990	(Belgium) Eric Vanderaerden (Belgium) Etienne De Wilde	(Italy) Pierangelo Bincoletto (Italy) Guido Bontempi	(Belgium) Johan Bruyneel (Australia) Danny Clark
1991	(Belgium) Rudy Dhaenens (Belgium) Etienne De Wilde	(Belgium) Stan Tourné (Denmark) Jens Veggerby	(Belgium) Johan Bruyneel (Australia) Danny Clark
1992	(Belgium) Stan Tourné (Denmark) Jens Veggerby	(Switzerland) Urs Freuler (Netherlands) Peter Pieters	(Italy) Adriano Baffi (Italy) Pierangelo Bincoletto
1993	(Russia) Konstantín Khrabtsov (Belgium) Etienne De Wilde	(Switzerland) Urs Freuler (Netherlands) Peter Pieters	(Italy) Pierangelo Bincoletto (Italy) Guido Bontempi
1994	(Denmark) Jens Veggerby (Belgium) Etienne De Wilde	(Italy) Adriano Baffi (Italy) Pierangelo Bincoletto	(Switzerland) Kurt Betschart (Switzerland) Bruno Risi
