= Six Days of Paris =

- Poster to the 1957 edition

Race details
- Region: Paris, France
- Local name: Six Jours du Paris (in French)
- Discipline: Track
- Type: Six-day racing

History
- First edition: 1913
- Editions: 42 (as of 1981)
- Final edition: 1981
- First winner: Alfred Goullet (AUS); Joe Fogler (USA)
- Final winner: Charly Mottet (FRA); Etienne De Wilde (BEL)

The Six Days of Paris was a six-day track cycling race held annually in Paris, France.

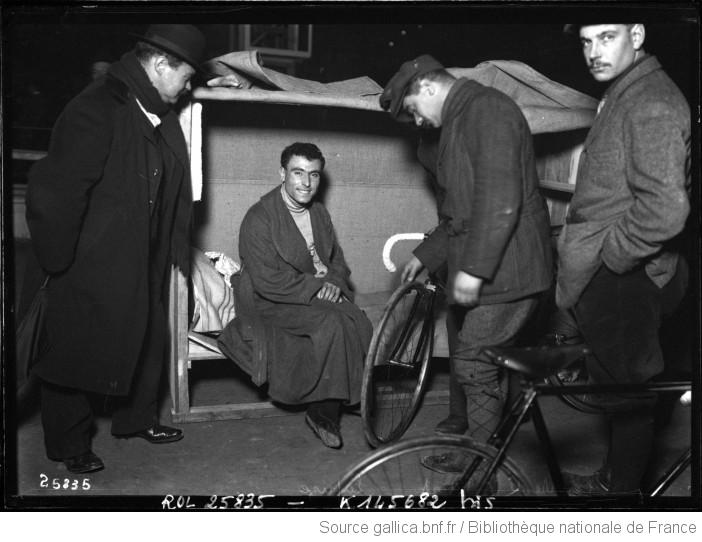
Octave Lapize resting in the Paris Winter Velodrome at the inaugural Six Days of Paris, January 1913

== Winners ==
Year	Winner
1913	(Australia) Alfred Goullet (United States) Joe Fogler
1914	(France) Léon Hourlier (France) Léon Comès
1915–1920	No race
1921	(Switzerland) Oscar Egg (France) Georges Sérès
1922	(Belgium) Emile Aerts (France) Georges Sérès
1923	(Switzerland) Oscar Egg (Netherlands) Piet van Kempen
1924	(Belgium) Emile Aerts (France) Georges Sérès
1925	(France) Alfred Beyl (Netherlands) Piet van Kempen
1926	(France) Charles Lacquehay (France) Georges Wambst
1927	(Belgium) Emile Aerts (Australia) Reginald McNamara
1928 (1)	(France) Charles Lacquehay (France) Georges Wambst
1928 (2)	(France) Onésime Boucheron (Italy) Alessandro Tonani
1929	(France) André Raynaud (France) Octave Dayen
1930	(France) Charles Pélissier (France) Armand Blanchonnet
1931	(Italy) Pietro Linari (Italy) Alfredo Dinale
1932	(Netherlands) Piet van Kempen (Netherlands) Jan Pijnenburg

Year	Winner
1933	(France) Paul Broccardo (France) Marcel Guimbretière
1934	(Netherlands) Jan Pijnenburg (Netherlands) Cor Wals
1935 (1)	(France) Paul Broccardo (France) Marcel Guimbretière
1935 (2)	(France) Maurice Archambaud (France) Roger Lapébie
1936	(Netherlands) Kees Pellenaars (Germany) Adolf Schön
1937	(Belgium) Albert Billiet (Netherlands) Cor Wals
1938	(Belgium) Albert Billiet (Belgium) Karel Kaers
1939	(Belgium) Albert Billiet (Belgium) Albert Buysse
1940–1945	No race
1946	(Netherlands) Gerrit Schulte (Netherlands) Gerrit Boeijen
1947	(Belgium) Achiel Bruneel (Belgium) Robert Naeye
1948	(France) Arthur Sérès (France) Guy Lapébie
1949	(Belgium) Achiel Bruneel (France) Guy Lapébie
1950	(Netherlands) Gerrit Schulte (Netherlands) Gerrit Peters
1951	(Belgium) René Adriaenssens (Belgium) Albert Bruylandt
1952	(Belgium) Rik Van Steenbergen (Belgium) Achiel Bruneel

Year	Winner
1953	(Netherlands) Gerrit Schulte (Netherlands) Gerrit Peters
1954	(France) Roger Godeau (France) Georges Senfftleben
1955	(Australia) Reginald Arnold (Australia) Sid Patterson (Australia) Russell Mockridge
1956	(Switzerland) Walter Bucher (Switzerland) Oskar Plattner (Switzerland) Jean Roth
1957	(France) Jacques Anquetil (France) André Darrigade (Italy) Ferdinando Terruzzi
1958	(France) Jacques Anquetil (France) André Darrigade (Italy) Ferdinando Terruzzi
1959–1983	No race
1984 (1)	(Denmark) Gert Frank (France) Bernard Vallet
1984 (2)	(Italy) Francesco Moser (Netherlands) René Pijnen
1985	(Belgium) Stan Tourné (Belgium) Etienne De Wilde
1986	(Australia) Danny Clark (France) Bernard Vallet
1987	No race
1988	(Australia) Danny Clark (United Kingdom) Anthony Doyle
1989	(France) Charly Mottet (Belgium) Etienne De Wilde
