= Urban Forest of Palma =

- Bosc Urbà de Palma (ca); Bosque Urbano de Palma (es)
- Interactive map of Urban Forest of Palma
- Type: Public park
- Location: Palma, Spain
- Coordinates: 39°34′43″N 2°38′41″E
- Area: 34,000 m^{2} (370,000 sq ft)
- Created: 2018-under construction
- Operator: Palma City Council

The Urban Forest of Palma (in catalan, Bosc Urbà de Palma; in spanish, Bosque Urbano de Palma) is an urban park planned in 2015 and under construction since 2018. It is located in Palma (Balearic Islands, Spain), in the space occupied by two sports facilities now in disuse, the Canódromo Balear and Tirador, in Es Fortí neighborhood. The first phase was completed in July 2022 and the second is expected to be carried out between 2027 and 2028.

== History ==
=== Precedents: la Falca Verda ===
At beginning of 21st century, the Palma City Council began planning a large public park called Sa Falca Verda on land where it had been planned for decades. Among other lands, this future space was to include the lands of two sports facilities that had already been closed: Tirador (a track for cycling), closed in 1973, and Canódromo Balear (for greyhound races), closed in 1999. In 2002 the project designed by architect Manuel Ribas Piera was approved, which envisaged several phases of execution, one of which included greyhound and cycling tracks and envisaged the replacement of the old sports structures with a new urbanization, similar to the design of the rest of the park.

In 2005, work began with the construction of a part of the project: the so-called Parc de la Riera, which opened its doors in 2007. The construction of the rest of Sa Falca Verda remained stalled. Specifically, in the case of future Bosc Urbà because the expropriation of the greyhound track could not be achieved until 2008 and the cycling track, until 2015.

=== New design. The urban park ===
On 28 December 28 2015 the city council presented a new project for the area: the so-called Bosc Urbà (urban park). This new plan separated it from the rest of Sa Falca Verda, reconfigured as a park distinct from the rest; it replaced the original project with another by the architect Isabel Bennasar that preserved the old sports structures and planned to landscape the area taking them as a base, in addition to increasing the area dedicated to trees and vegetation in relation to the original project by Ribas Piera.

The works did not start on time and on 14 February 2017 the project was re-submitted, now divided into two phases and to be implemented on the greyhound track. This new project also did not start on time.

=== Execution ===
The works on the Urban Forest began on 27 July 2018 in first phase, corresponding to Canódromo Balear. It was expected to last twelve months and then the second phase corresponding to Tirador would be implemented. However, the deadlines were extended longer than expected on several occasions, so that first phase of the green area did not open to the public until 29 July 2022. As for the second phase, corresponding to the velodrome, it was officially presented on 22 May 2025, according to a design by architects Isabel Bennasar and Corina Dîndăreanu, and is expected to be carried out between 2027 and 2028.

== Description ==
Despite the name of forest, the dimensions correspond of an urban park, since when it is completely finished the space will have a total of approximately 34,000 m^{2}, made up of 16,000 of greyhound track and 18,000 of cyclist track (for comparison, the main green lung of the city, Bosc de Bellver, exceeds one million m^{2}). However, the plan is quite different from the rest of the city's parks, since it is characterized by a basically soft, tree-lined and sparsely paved surface (with the exception of the accesses), in comparison with the rest of the main parks in the city, which would make it conceptually similar to surfaces such as Bosc de Bellver.

The site of the future park has an irregular shape and extends along the stretch of the Riera stream that runs between Es Fortí and Bons Aires neighborhoods. The perimeter is marked by Miquel dels Sants Oliver street (west), the military installations of Es Fortí (north), Jesús and Carles I streets (east), and the IES Ramon Llull and building of La Riera (UIB), to south.

In the first phase of the park, corresponding to Canódromo Balear, 280 trees have been planted: holm oaks, maples, linden trees, olive trees, elms, pines, poplars, oaks and cypresses, in addition to the planting of shrubs, lawn, spartium, grass, laurel, and bush, among others. It incorporates drainage systems so that rainwater is self-managed, complemented by irrigation systems with regenerated water. In addition to urban furniture and pedestrian routes, elimination of architectural barriers at the entrances to the park connected to the adjacent streets. The entire park will be crossed by the Riera stream and two footbridges will be built to connect the two parts of the Urban Forest.

Its strategic location, near important educational centers (Lluís Vives School, IES Ramon Llull and IES Joan Alcover high schools, among others), the historic center and easy access (near the Avingudes de Palma), everything suggests that it will be a very popular green area, especially for children and adolescents.

== See also ==
- Tirador (velodrome)
- Canódromo Balear
