= Six Days of Essen =

Former annual German cycling race

Race details
- Date: February, March
- Region: Essen, Germany
- Local name(s): Sechstagerennen von Essen (in German)
- Discipline: Track
- Type: Six-day racing

History
- First edition: 1960
- Editions: 8
- Final edition: 1967
- First winner: Hans Jarosczewicz (GER); Günther Ziegler (GER)
- Most wins: Fritz Pfenninger (SUI); Peter Post (NED) (3 wins)
- Final winner: Fritz Pfenninger (SUI); Peter Post (NED)

The Six Days of Essen was a short-lived six-day track cycling race held annually in Essen, Germany.

Fritz Pfenninger and Peter Post won in three of the eight editions, of which two as couple.

== Winners ==
Year	Winner	Second	Third
1960	(Germany) Hans Jarosczewicz (Germany) Günther Ziegler	(Germany) Klaus Bugdahl (Netherlands) Gerrit Schulte	(Australia) Reginald Arnold (Italy) Ferdinando Terruzzi
1961	(Australia) Reginald Arnold (Italy) Ferdinando Terruzzi	(Germany) Rudi Altig (Germany) Hans Junkermann	(Germany) Klaus Bugdahl (Switzerland) Jean Roth
1962	(Germany) Klaus Bugdahl (Switzerland) Fritz Pfenninger	(Germany) Rudi Altig (Germany) Hans Junkermann	(Belgium) Emile Severeyns (Belgium) Rik Van Steenbergen
1963	(Germany) Rudi Altig (Germany) Hans Junkermann	(Netherlands) Peter Post (Belgium) Rik Van Steenbergen	(Germany) Klaus Bugdahl (Switzerland) Fritz Pfenninger
1964	(Germany) Rudi Altig (Germany) Hans Junkermann	(Germany) Klaus Bugdahl (Germany) Sigi Renz	(Denmark) Palle Lykke Jensen (Belgium) Rik Van Steenbergen
1965	(Netherlands) Peter Post (Belgium) Rik Van Steenbergen	(Germany) Rudi Altig (Germany) Hans Junkermann	(Denmark) Palle Lykke Jensen (Denmark) Freddy Eugen
1966	(Netherlands) Peter Post (Switzerland) Fritz Pfenninger	(Germany) Klaus Bugdahl (Germany) Sigi Renz	(Germany) Rudi Altig (Germany) Dieter Kemper
1967	(Netherlands) Peter Post (Switzerland) Fritz Pfenninger	(Germany) Sigi Renz (Germany) Hans Junkermann	(Germany) Horst Oldenburg (Germany) Dieter Kemper
