= 1946 UCI Track Cycling World Championships =

- Venue: Zurich, Switzerland
- Date: 24 August - 1 September 1946
- Velodrome: Oerlikon Velodrome
- Events: 5

The 1946 UCI Track Cycling World Championships were the World Championship for track cycling. They took place in Zurich, Switzerland, from 24 August to 1 September 1946. Five events for men were contested, 3 for professionals and 2 for amateurs.

== Medal summary ==
Event	Gold	Silver	Bronze
Men's Professional Events
Men's sprint	Jan Derksen; Netherlands	Georges Senfftleben; France	Arie van Vliet; Netherlands
Men's individual pursuit	Gerrit Peters; Netherlands	Roger Piel; France	Arne Werner Pedersen; Denmark
Men's motor-paced	Elio Frosio; Italy	Jacques Besson; Switzerland	Louis Chaillot; France
Men's Amateur Events
Men's sprint	Oscar Plattner; Switzerland	Axel Schandorff; Denmark	Cornelis Byster; Netherlands
Men's individual pursuit	Roger Rioland; France	Børge Gissel; Denmark	Harald Janemar; Sweden

== Medal table ==
Rank	Nation	Gold	Silver	Bronze	Total
1	Netherlands (NED)	2	0	2	4
2	France (FRA)	1	2	1	4
3	Switzerland (SUI)	1	1	0	2
4	Italy (ITA)	1	0	0	1
5	Denmark (DEN)	0	2	1	3
6	Sweden (SWE)	0	0	1	1
Totals (6 entries)		5	5	5	15

== See also ==
- 1946 UCI Road World Championships
