= Omer De Bruycker =

Belgian cyclist

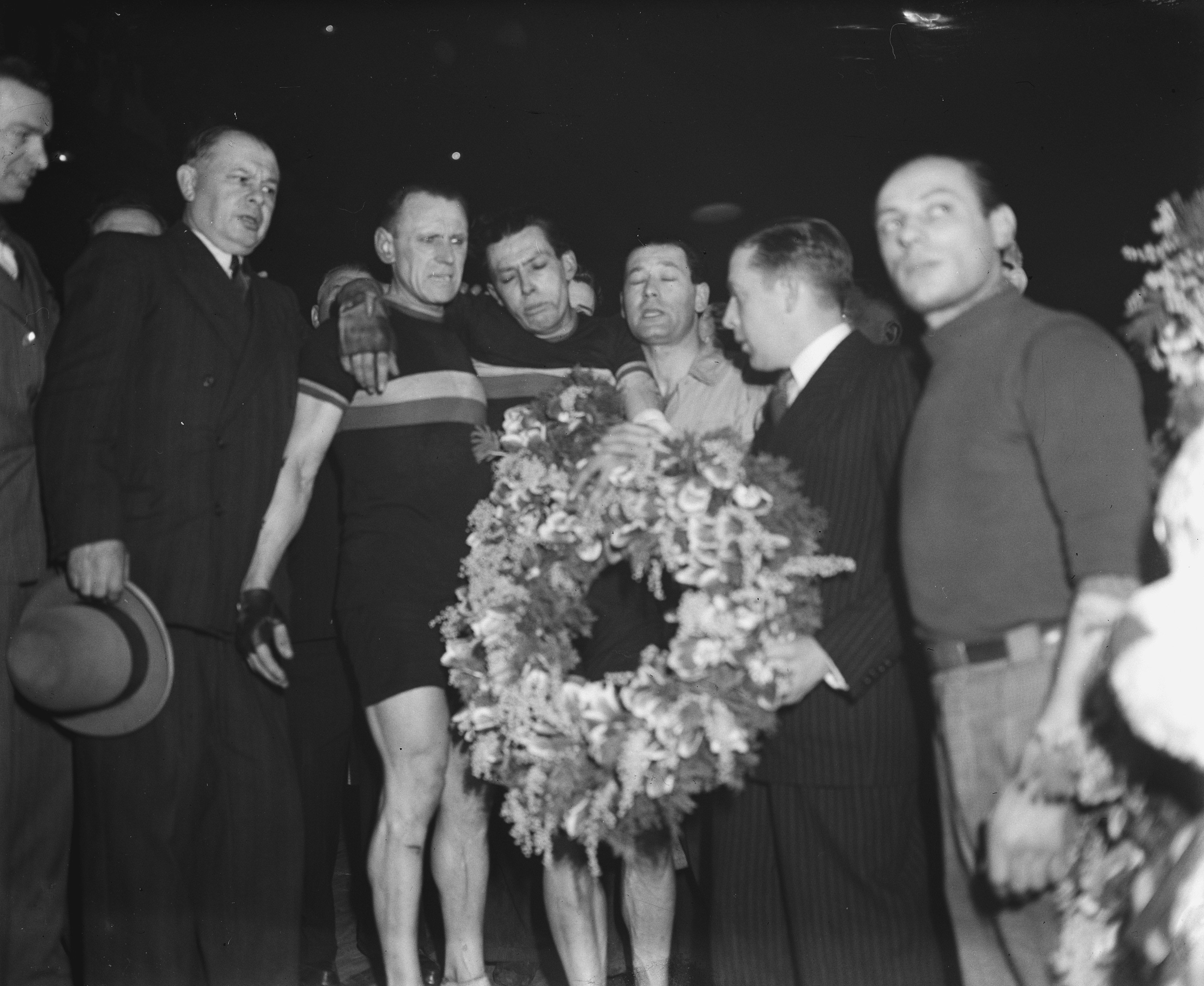
- 41 year-old De Brucker (middle left) after winning the 1947 Six Days of Antwerp

Personal information
- Born: February 10, 1906 Zelzate, Belgium
- Died: June 3, 1989 (aged 83) Ghent, Belgium

Cycling career
- Sport: Cycling
- Discipline: Track
- Role: Rider

Omer De Bruycker (10 February 1906 in Zelzate, Belgium – 3 June 1989 in Ghent) was a Belgian racing cyclist. He was a professional from 1930 to 1947.

== History ==
De Bruycker was one of the world's best team racers in the 1930s. Together with his friend and fellow countryman Fred Haemerlinck, he was virtually unbeatable in the couple stages. In his nomadic professional life, De Bruycker won more than 300 track races and nine six-day races. When in 1947 he formed a couple with Rik Van Steenbergen, eighteen years his junior, in a home match on the open-air track in Zelzate, fate struck. In a spectacular fall, he suffered a double skull fracture. After months of rehabilitation, the doctor forbade him to participate in competitive sports. De Bruycker spent the rest of his active life as a taxi driver.

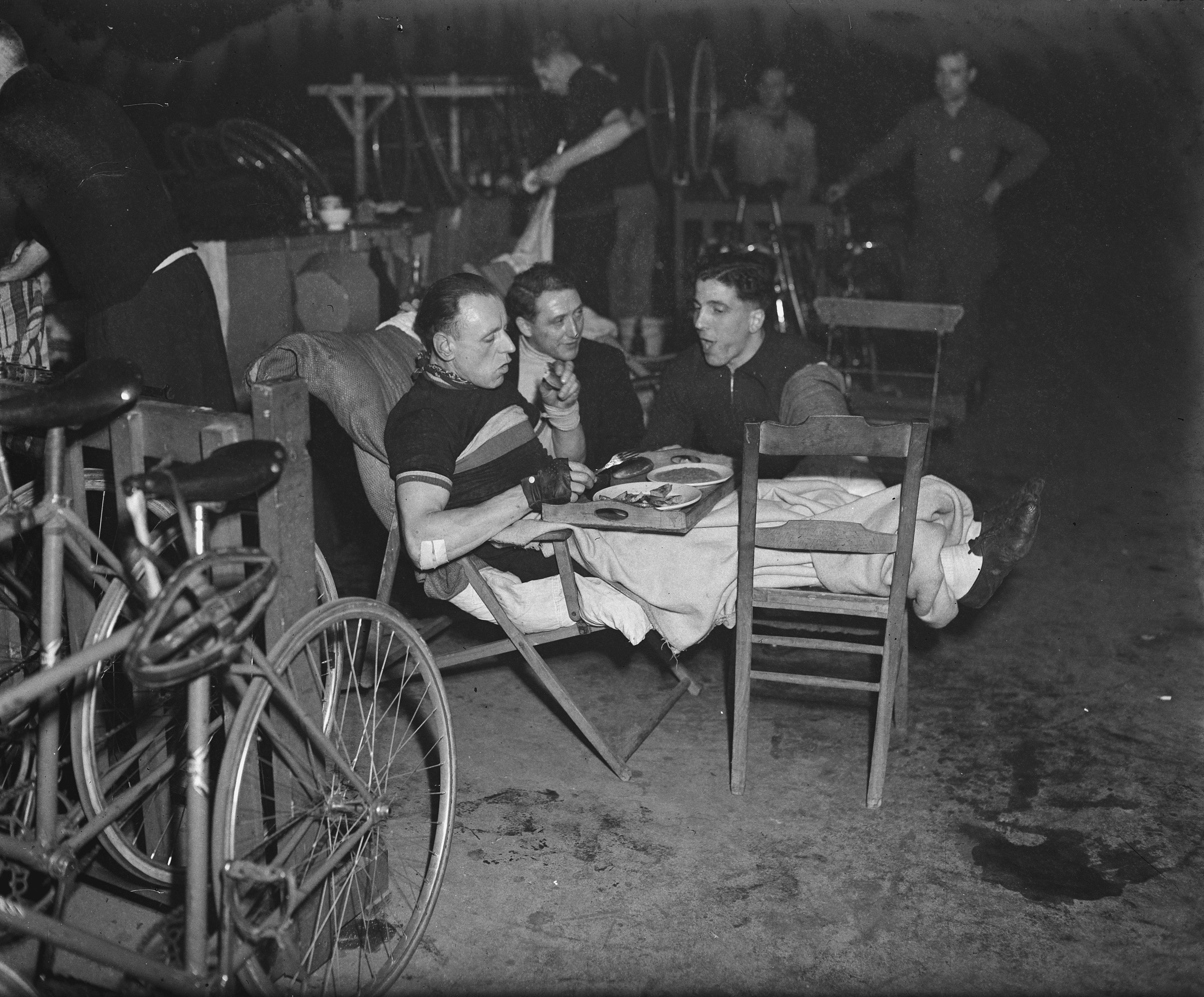
De Bruycker during a break at the 1947 Six Days of Antwerp

== Palmares ==
1931
1st Six Days of Saint-Étienne (with Albert Billiet)
1932
1st Prix Goullet-Fogler (fr) (with Jean Aerts)
1936
2nd Six Days of New York (with Frederick Verhaege)
1937
1st Six Days of Brussels (with Jean Aerts)
1st Six Days of New York (with Jean Aerts)
2nd Prix du Salon (with Gustave Danneels)
1938
1st Six Days of Buffalo (with Alfred Letourneur)
1st Six Days of Chicago (with Alfred Letourneur)
1939
1st Six Days of London (with Karel Kaers)
1st Six Days of Copenhagen (with Karel Kaers)
3rd Six Days of Antwerp (with Karel Kaers)
3rd Six Days of Brussels (with Karel Kaers)
1940
1st Six Days of Brussels (with Karel Kaers)
1945
1st Prix Raynaud-Dayen (fr) (with Achiel Bruneel)
1946
3rd Six Days of Paris (with Achiel Bruneel)
1947
1st Six Days of Antwerp (with Achiel Bruneel)
