= Gargallo (surname) =

Gargallo is a surname. Notable people with the surname include:

- Francesca Gargallo (1956 – 2022), Sicilian-born Mexican writer and poet
- Ligia Gargallo, Chilean chemist and professor
- Manuel García Gargallo (born 1973), Spanish researcher and writer
- María Teresa Gargallo (born 1969), Spanish racewalker
- Pablo Gargallo (1881–1934), Spanish sculptor and painter
- Tomás Gargallo (1536 – 1614), Spanish Roman Catholic prelate and Bishop of Malta

== See also ==
- Gargallo (disambiguation)
