= Oscar Plattner =

Swiss cyclist

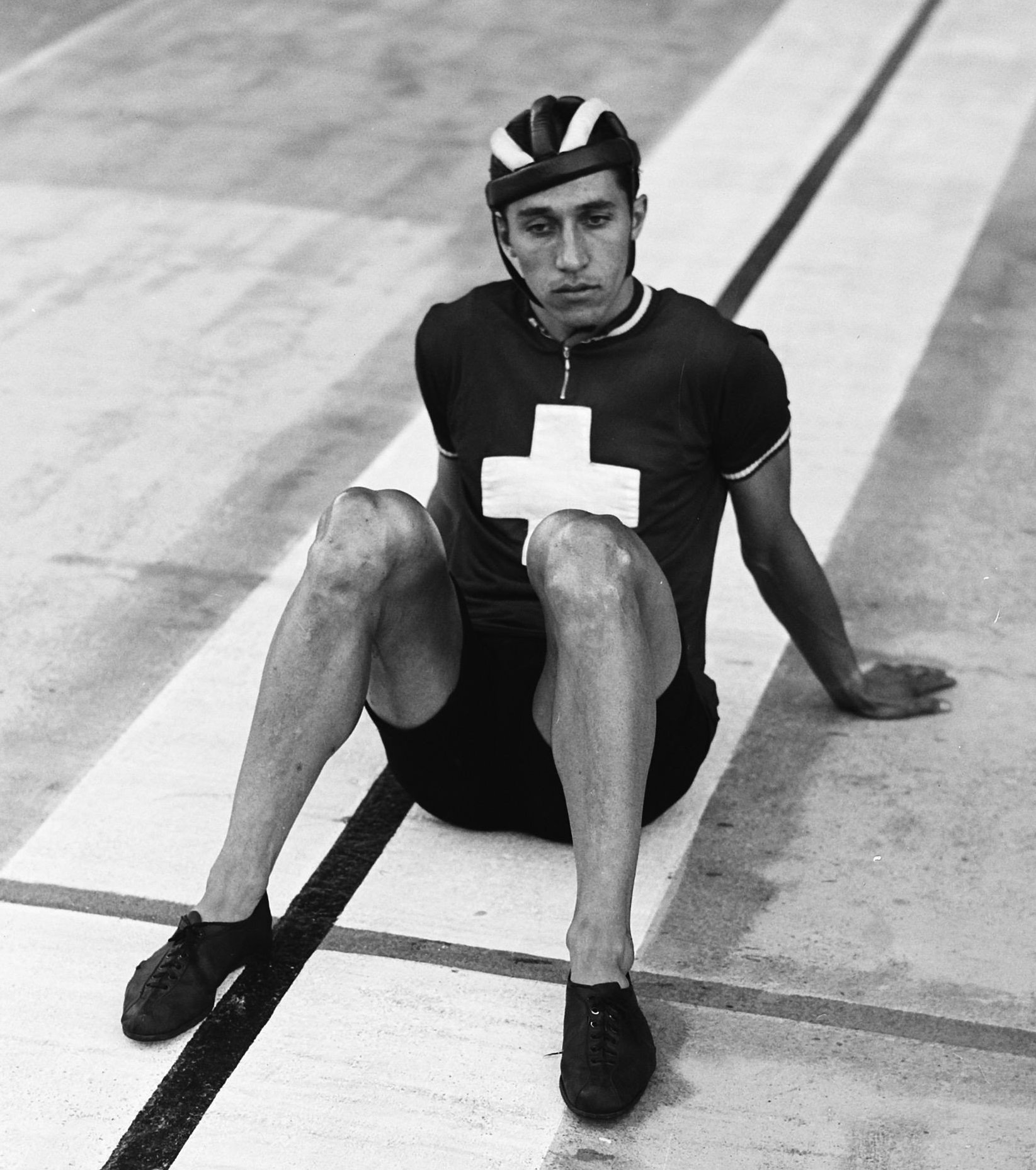

Personal information
- Full name: Oscar Ernest Plattner
- Nickname: Le Machiavel du Sprint
- Born: 17 February 1922 Tschappina, Switzerland
- Died: 21 August 2002 (aged 80) Zürich, Switzerland

Cycling career
- Sport: Cycling
- Disciplines: Track, Road
- Role: Rider
- Rider type: Sprinter

Professional teams
- 1947–1949: Tebag
- 1951–1952: Condor
- 1953–1958: Raleigh
- 1959: Condor
- 1962: Condor
Medal record
Men's track cycling
Representing France
World Championships
| Gold medal – first place | 1946 Zürich | Amateur Sprint |
| Gold medal – first place | 1952 Paris | Sprint |
| Silver medal – second place | 1955 Milan | Sprint |
| Bronze medal – third place | 1956 Copenhagen | Sprint |
| Silver medal – second place | 1960 Leipzig | Sprint |
| Bronze medal – third place | 1962 Milan | Sprint |

Oscar Plattner (17 February 1922 – 21 August 2002) was a Swiss cyclist.

== National and International Wins ==
Every year between and including 1944 and 1946, Plattner won the Swiss National Amateur Sprint Championships. In 1946, he additionally won the World Amateur Sprint Championships. From 1947 until 1964, Plattner competed in the Swiss National Sprint Championships and won every year he participated. Another notable achievement is his title at the World Sprint Championships in 1952.

Plattner won the Tour de Berne in 1950 and the Grand Prix du Paris in 1953. He won the Six Days of Copenhagen in 1951, with Kay Werner Nielsen; the Six Days of Hannover in 1953, with Hans Preiskeit; the Six Days of Antwerp in 1953, with Achiel Bruneel, and in 1962, with Peter Post and Rik Van Looy; the Six Days of Paris in 1956, with Walter Bucher and Jean Roth; the Six Days of Aarhus in 1956, with Fritz Pfenniger; and the Six Days of Madrid and the Six Days of New York in 1961, both with Armin von Büren. Plattner also won the national Madison championships in 1958 and 1959 with Walter Bucher.

== Major results ==
1944
1st National Amateur Sprint Championships
1945
1st National Amateur Sprint Championships
1946
1st World Amateur Sprint Championships
1st National Amateur Sprint Championships
1947
1st National Sprint Championships
1948
1st National Sprint Championships
1949
1st National Sprint Championships
1950
1st Tour de Berne
1st National Sprint Championships
1951
1st National Sprint Championships
1st Six Days of Copenhagen (with Kay Werner Nielsen)
1952
1st World Sprint Championships
1st National Sprint Championships
1953
1st National Sprint Championships
1st Grand Prix de Paris
1st Six Days of Hannover (with Hans Preiskeit)
1st Six Days of Antwerp (with Achiel Bruneel)
1954
1st National Sprint Championships
1955
1st National Sprint Championships
1956
1st Six Days of Paris (with Walter Bucher and Jean Roth)
1st Six Days of Aarhus (with Fritz Pfenninger)
1958
1st National Sprint Championships
1st National Madison Championships (with Walter Bucher)
1959
1st National Madison Championships (with Walter Bucher)
1960
1st National Sprint Championships
1961
1st National Sprint Championships
1st Six Days of Madrid (with Armin von Büren)
1st Six Days of New York (with Armin von Büren)
1962
1st National Sprint Championships
1st Six Days of Antwerp (with Peter Post and Rik Van Looy)
1963
1st National Sprint Championships
1964
1st National Sprint Championships
