= Willy Lauwers =

Belgian cyclist (1936–1959)

Personal information
- Nickname: Rupske Lauwers
- Born: 16 April 1936 Hemiksem, Belgium
- Died: 12 April 1959 (aged 22) Palma de Mallorca, Spain

Cycling career
- Sport: Cycling
- Disciplines: Road, Track
- Role: Rider

Professional teams
- 1956: Libertas
- 1957: Girardengo
- 1958: Libertas–Dr. Mann
- 1959: Flandria–Dr.Mann

Willy "Rupske" Lauwers (16 April 1936 – 12 April 1959) was a Belgian professional cyclist. He was born in Hemiksem, Belgium. Lauwers owned his nickname to the way he moved on his bicycle like a caterpillar (Dutch: rups), rocking and wriggling. In addition, thanks to his agility on the bike, he managed to maneuver through the smallest gaps in the peloton. His father was the Belgian cyclist Stan Lauwers.

In 1957, at the age of 21, he won the Six Days of Antwerp together with Reginald Arnold and Ferdinando Terruzzi. In the same year he was also the best in Leuven, Oudenaarde, Moerbeke and in Sint-Jansteen, the Netherlands. He was believed to have a great career ahead of him, both on the track and on the road.

Lauwers died from serious injuries suffered following a fall at the Tirador velodrome in Palma de Majorca, during a race behind motors. While cycling at a speed of over 70 km/h (43 mph), he suddenly lost his balance and fell on the track, and was subsequently hit by the motorbike of the rider Gomila who was following him a short distance away. Lauwers was rushed to hospital and died shortly afterwards. More than 10,000 people attended his funeral in Hemiksem.

Since 2002, the Grote Prijs Rupske Lauwers, a cycle race in Hemiksem is organized to honor him. A memorial plaque was inaugurated there in 2022, in a street named Rupske Lauwerslaan.

== Major results ==
1954
2nd Scheldeprijs
1956
1st Prix du Salon with Arsene Rijckaert
2nd Six Days of Brussels with Arsene Rijckaert
2nd Hanret criterium
1957
1st Six Days of Antwerp with Reginald Arnold & Ferdinando Terruzzi
1st Prix Goullet-Fogler with Arsene Rijckaert
1st Leuven
3rd Antwerpen–Herselt
1958
1st Antwerp
1st Borgerhout
1st Hoegaarden–Antwerpen–Hoegaarden

== See also ==
- List of racing cyclists and pacemakers with a cycling-related death
