= Achiel Bruneel =

Belgian cyclist

Personal information
- Full name: Ludovicus Achilles Bruneel
- Born: 19 October 1918 Herenthout, Belgium
- Died: 5 June 2008 (aged 89)

Cycling career
- Sport: Cycling
- Discipline: Track
- Role: Rider

Professional teams
- 1939: Alcyon-Dunlop
- 1940-1942: Individual
- 1943: Europe-Dunlop
- 1944-1946: Individual
- 1947: Dayton
- 1948-1955: Individual
Medal record
Representing Belgium
Men's track cycling
European Championships
Silver medal – second place	1949 Brussels	Madison
Silver medal – second place	1950 Zürich	Madison
Bronze medal – third place	1953 Zürich	Madison
Bronze medal – third place	1954 Zürich	Madison

Achiel Bruneel (19 October 1918 – 5 June 2008) was a professional track cyclist from Herenthout, Belgium.

He rode different Six-days events of which he eventually won 12, remarkably with 9 different teammates.

== Major results ==
1940
2nd Six Days of Brussels (with Jef Scherens)
2nd Six Days of Antwerp (with Roger Deneef)
1942
1st Six Days of Antwerp (with Karel Kaers)
1946
1st Prix Raynaud-Dayen Paris (with Omer De Bruycker)
3rd Six Days of Paris (with Omer De Bruycker)
1947
1st Six Days of Antwerp (with Omer De Bruycker)
1st Six Days of Paris (with Robert Naeye)
1948
1st Six Days of Ghent (with Camile Dekuysscher)
2nd Six Days of Brussels (with Camile Dekuysscher)
1949
1st Six Days of Paris (with Guy Lapébie)
2nd European Track Championships – Madison (with Camile Dekuysscher)
1950
1st Six Days of Antwerp (with Rik Van Steenbergen)
1st Six Days of Saint-Étienne (with Guy Lapébie)
1st Six Days of Brussels (with Jozef De Beuckelaer)
1st Prix Dupré-Lapize Paris (with Jozef De Beuckelaer)
2nd European Track Championships – Madison (with Guy Lapébie)
2nd Six Days of Paris (with Guy Lapébie)
3rd Six Days of Ghent (with Albert Bruylandt)
1951
2nd Six Days of Ghent (with Rik Van Steenbergen)
2nd Six Days of Paris (with Jozef De Beuckelaer)
3rd Six Days of Antwerp (with Jozef De Beuckelaer)
1952
1st Six Days of Paris (with Rik Van Steenbergen)
1st Six Days of Brussels (with Lucien Acou)
2nd Six Days of Antwerp (with Rik Van Steenbergen)
1953
1st Six Days of Antwerp (with Oscar Plattner)
1st Six Days of Ghent (with Arsène Rijckaert)
2nd Six Days of Paris (with Rik Van Steenbergen)
3rd Six Days of Copenhagen (with Lucien Acou)
3rd European Track Championships – Madison (with Arsene Ryckaert)
1954
1st Six Days of Dortmund (with Lucien Acou)
2nd Six Days of Ghent (with Lucien Acou)
3rd European Track Championships – Madison (with Lucien Acou)
