= Léon Hourlier =

French cyclist

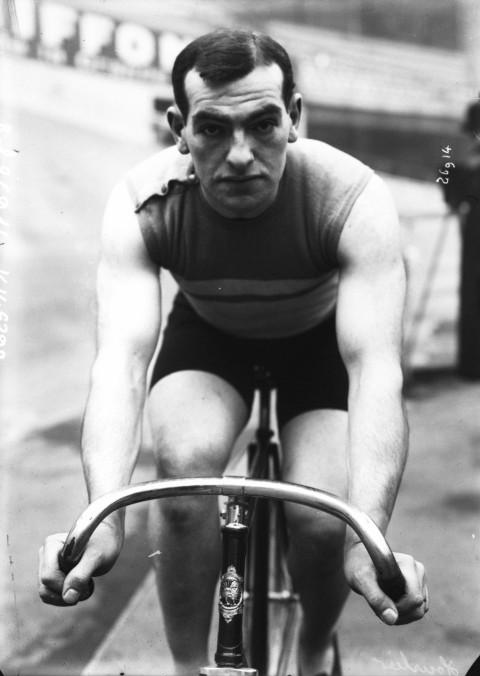
- Hourlier in 1913

Personal information
- Born: 16 September 1885 Reims, France
- Died: 16 October 1915 (aged 30) Saint-Étienne-au-Temple, France

Cycling career
- Sport: Cycling
- Discipline: Track
- Role: Rider
- Rider type: Sprinter

Professional team
- 1908–1914: –
Medal record
Men's track cycling
Representing France
World Championships
Silver medal – second place	1911 Rome	Sprint

Léon Hourlier (16 September 1885 – 16 October 1915) was a French cyclist. He was born in Reims, France. He won the French national cycling championships in 1909, 1911 and 1914. He also won the Grand Prix de Paris in 1914. Both Hourlier and his brother-in-law and fellow cyclist Léon Comès enlisted in the French military during World War I. They died together in a military air accident at Saint-Etienne-au-Temple in the Champagne district in France.
