= Arne Pedersen (cyclist) =

Danish cyclist (1917–1959)

Personal information
- Full name: Arne Werner Pedersen
- Born: 7 September 1917 Copenhagen, Denmark
- Died: 11 July 1959 (aged 41) Hovedstaden, Denmark

Cycling career
- Sport: Cycling
- Discipline: Track
- Role: Rider
Medal record
Representing Denmark
World Track Championships
Gold medal – first place	1946 Zürich	Individual pursuit

Arne Werner Pedersen (7 September 1917 – 11 July 1959) was a Danish cyclist. He competed in the 1000m time trial and team pursuit events at the 1936 Summer Olympics. He also won the bronze medal in the individual pursuit at the 1946 UCI Track Cycling World Championships.
