= Etienne De Wilde =

Belgian cyclist

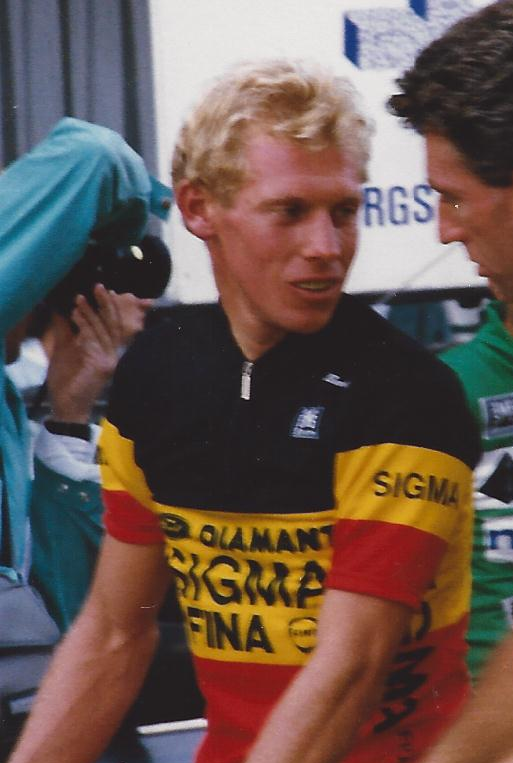
- De Wilde in 1988, wearing the Belgian national road race champions jersey

Personal information
- Full name: Etienne De Wilde
- Born: 23 March 1958 (age 68) Wetteren, Belgium

Cycling career
- Sport: Cycling
- Current team: Retired
- Disciplines: Road, Track
- Role: Rider

Professional teams
- 1980–1981: Splendor
- 1982–1984: La Redoute–Motobécane
- 1985: Safir-Vandeven
- 1986: Hitachi–Marc
- 1987–1991: Sigma–Fina
- 1992–1993: Team Telekom
- 1994: Collstrop
- 1995–1999: RDM

Major wins
- Grand Tours Tour de France 2 individual stages (1989, 1991) Vuelta a España 1 individual stage (1980) One-day races and Classics National Road race Championships (1988)
Medal record
Men's track cycling
Representing Belgium
Olympic Games
Silver medal – second place	2000 Sydney	Madison
World Championships
Gold medal – first place	1993 Hamar	Points race
Gold medal – first place	1998 Bordeaux	Madison
European Championships
Gold medal – first place	1989 Ghent	Omnium
Gold medal – first place	2000 Ghent	Madison
Silver medal – second place	1987 Stuttgart	Madison
Bronze medal – third place	1995 Manchester	Madison
Bronze medal – third place	1997 Dortmund	Madison

Etienne De Wilde (born 23 March 1958 in Wetteren, East Flanders) is a Belgian former professional road bicycle racer. De Wilde won races on the road and on the track. He won a silver medal in the madison at the 2000 Summer Olympics.

== Major results ==
1979
3rd National Amateur Road Race Championships
1980
1st Stage 12 Vuelta a España
1st Grand Prix d'Isbergues
1st Berlare & Nevele
5th Blois-Chaville
1981
1st Omloop van West-Brabant
1st Stage 1a Three Days of De Panne
1st Velaines sur Sambre & Wetteren
1982
1st Flèche Picarde
1st Stage 2 Four Days of Dunkirk
1st Stage 3 Tour de l'Oise
1st Mouscron, Wetteren & Zele
1983
1st Dwars door Vlaanderen
1st Flèche Picarde
1st Stage 3 Tour de l'Oise
1st Destelbergen, Laarne & Sint-Niklaas
5th Gent–Wevelgem
1984
1st Omloop van de Fruitstreken
1985
1st Stage 1 Setmana Catalana de Ciclisme
1st Temse
1986
1st Omnium, National Track Championships
1st Stage 2 Tour de l'Aude
1st Merelbeke
3rd National Road Race Championships
1987
1st Scheldeprijs
1st Nokere Koerse
1st Boucles Parisiennes
1st Stage 2 Tour de l'Oise
1st Hasselt & Ninove
2nd European madison championship (with Stan Tourné)
2nd Gent–Wevelgem
1988
1st National Road Race Championships
1st Omnium, National Track Championships
1st GP Wielerrevue
1st Stage 4 Paris–Nice
1st Stage 2 Tour Méditerranéen
1st Stage 1 Three Days of De Panne
1st Prologue Tour of Belgium
1st Beveren-Leie, Sint-Katelijne-Waver & Scherpenheuvel
1989
(Europe) Omnium, European Track Championships
1st Overall Étoile de Bessèges

1st Stages 1, 3 & 4

1st Omloop Het Volk
1st Kampioenschap van Vlaanderen
1st Stage 7 Tour de France
1st Stages 1 & 2 Paris–Nice
1st Stages 3a & 6 La Méditerranéenne
1st Stage 4 Tour d'Armorique
1st Aalst, Geraardsbergen, Herselt, Laarne and 's Heerenhoek
4th Wincanton Classic
1990
1st Grand Prix d'Ouverture La Marseillaise
1st Omloop van de Fruitstreken
1st Stage 2 Paris–Nice
1st Stage 3 Tour Méditerranéen
1st Stage 1 Tour of Belgium
1991
1st GP Wielerrevue
1st Stage 3 Tour de France
1st Ronse
1993
World Points Race Champion
1st Wetteren
1994
1st Omloop van het Houtland
1st Coca Cola Trophy
1st Ennepetal
2nd Points race, National Track Championships
1995
1st Wetteren
(bronze) European Madison Championship (with Lorenzo Lapage)
1997
1st Rodenkirchen
(bronze) European Madison Championship (with Frank Corvers)
1998
1st Madison (with Matthew Gilmore), UCI Track World Championships
1st Omloop van het Houtland
1st Dentergem & Stekene
1999
1st Grote Prijs Stad Zottegem
1st Omloop van het Houtland
1st Deurne
2000
(Europe) European Madison Champion (with Matthew Gilmore)
(silver) Olympic Games - Men's Madison (with Matthew Gilmore)
2001
(Europe) European Madison Champion (with Matthew Gilmore)

== Six Days-wins ==
1983
Six Days of Ghent (with René Pijnen)
1985
Six Days of Ghent (with Stan Tourné)
Six Days of Paris (with Stan Tourné)
1987
Six Days of Ghent (with Danny Clark)
Six Days of Antwerp (with Danny Clark)
1988
Six Days of Köln (with Stan Tourné)
Six Days of Antwerp (with Stan Tourné)
1989
Six Days of Paris (with Charly Mottet)
Six Days of Dortmund (with Andreas Kappes)
Six Days of Munich (with Andreas Kappes)
Six Days of Ghent (with Stan Tourné)
1990
Six Days of Bordeaux (with Gilbert Duclos-Lassalle)
Six Days of Köln (with Andreas Kappes)
Six Days of Stuttgart (with Volker Diehl)
Six Days of Anvers (with Eric Vanderaerden)
1991
Six Days of Bremen (with Andreas Kappes)
Six Days of Ghent (with Tony Doyle)
Six Days of Köln (with Andreas Kappes)
Six Days of Stuttgart (with Andreas Kappes)
Six Days of Antwerp (with Rudy Dhaenens)
1992
Six Days of Bremen (with Andreas Kappes)
Six Days of Ghent (with Jens Veggerby)
1993
Six Days of Antwerp (with Kostantine Khrabzov)
Six Days of Stuttgart (with Andreas Kappes)
1994
Six Days of Antwerp (with Jens Veggerby)
Six Days of Ghent (with Danny Clark)
Six Days of Stuttgart (with Jens Veggerby)
1995
Six Days of Bordeaux (with Frédéric Magné)
Six Days of Ghent (with Andreas Kappes)
Six Days of Munich (with Erik Zabel)
Six Days of Stuttgart (with Danny Clark)
1997
Six Days of Ghent (with Matthew Gilmore)
Six Days of Köln (with Olaf Ludwig)
1998
Six Days of Leipzig (with Andreas Kappes)
Six Days of Milan (with Silvio Martinello)
1999
Six Days of Berlin (with Andreas Kappes)
