= Canódromo Balear =

- Es Canòdrom
- Interactive map of Canódromo Balear
- Location: Llorenç Cerdà, s/n
- Coordinates: 39.5783°N 2.6453°E
- Owner: Municipal property
- Field size: 376,50 m.

Construction
- Opened: 13 June 1932
- Renovated: 2018-2022 (public park)
- Closed: 30 March 1999

Canódromo Balear is a sports venue in Palma (Balearic Islands, Spain) originally dedicated to greyhound racing. It was built in 1932 on private initiative and operated until 1999, when it fell unused and abandoned. It is currently municipally owned and has been converted into a green area as part of Palma Urban Forest.

== History ==
Greyhound racing arrived in Mallorca in 1931, promoted by Club Deportivo Galguero Balear society. Due to the lack of suitable ground, the racetrack was initially held at the then existing racetrack in the Buenos Aires district of the city. Shortly after, and given its success, the society acquired the land known as Ses Parellades Baixes, located in the current Es Fortí district. The facility was inaugurated on 13 June 1932. Among other events, the venue hosted Spanish Championship seven times (1943, 1951, 1956, 1971, 1980, 1989 and 1991) and one European Championship (1956). The 1991 Spanish Championship was one of the last major events hosted by the facility.

The facility operated until its final closure on 30 March 1999, and was the penultimate dog track in Spain to cease operations. The last was the Canòdrom Meridiana in Barcelona, which closed in 2006.

== Conversion into a green area ==
Since the 1990s, Palma City Council had been planning the construction of a large green area on Sa Riera torrent called Sa Falca Verda (the Green Wedge). To this end, in August 1996 the expropriation procedures were initiated by the Palma City Council and in 2008 the facilities were demolished; Since then, only the site and the layout of the old track remained standing, as well as the wall and the entrances to the enclosure. The design of the park contemplated the disappearance of the Dog Track, but the legal appeals filed by other owners of affected plots and the delay in their resolution meant that only part of the park, inaugurated in 2007, which did not affect the enclosure was carried out, leaving the rest for a later phase.

Later, in 2015, the pending project of Sa Falca Verda that affected the Dog Track was discarded and replaced by another design that maintained the few vestiges that still remain of the facility (the track layout, walls and entrances), together with the adjacent site of old Tirador velodrome: the so-called Palma Urban Forest. The project planned to recover the remains of the old irrigation ditch of Font de la Vila, an infrastructure from the Muslim period built to supply water to the old medieval city. The works of the Palma Urban Forest began on 27 July 2018 and were expected to last twelve months. However, the works suffered repeated delays and mishaps that postponed its inauguration as a green area, until it was officially opened on 29 July 2022.

== Bibliography ==
- García-Gargallo, Manuel (2021). El Canòdrom Balear. Una historia del llebrer a Palma (in Catalan). Palma: Illa Edicions. ISBN 978-84-18441-28-8.
