= Gargallo =

Gargallo may refer to:

- Gargallo (surname)

== Places ==
- Gargallo, Piedmont, a commune in the province of Novara, Piedmont, Italy
- Priolo Gargallo, a commune in the province of Syracuse, Sicily, Italy
- Gargallo, Aragon, a municipality in the province of Teruel, Aragon, Spain
