= Léon Comès =

French cyclist

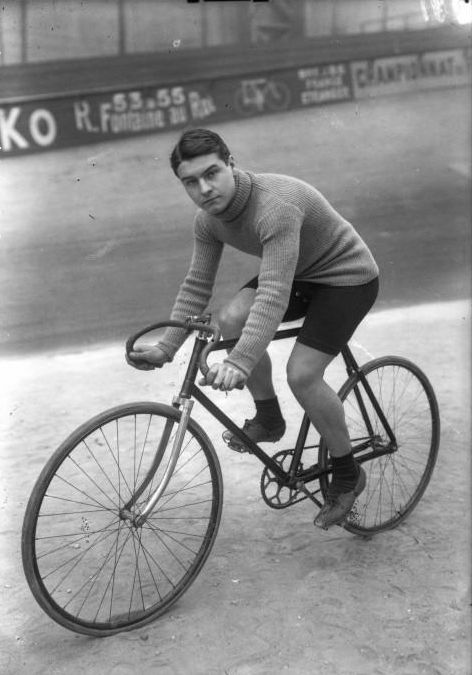
1909

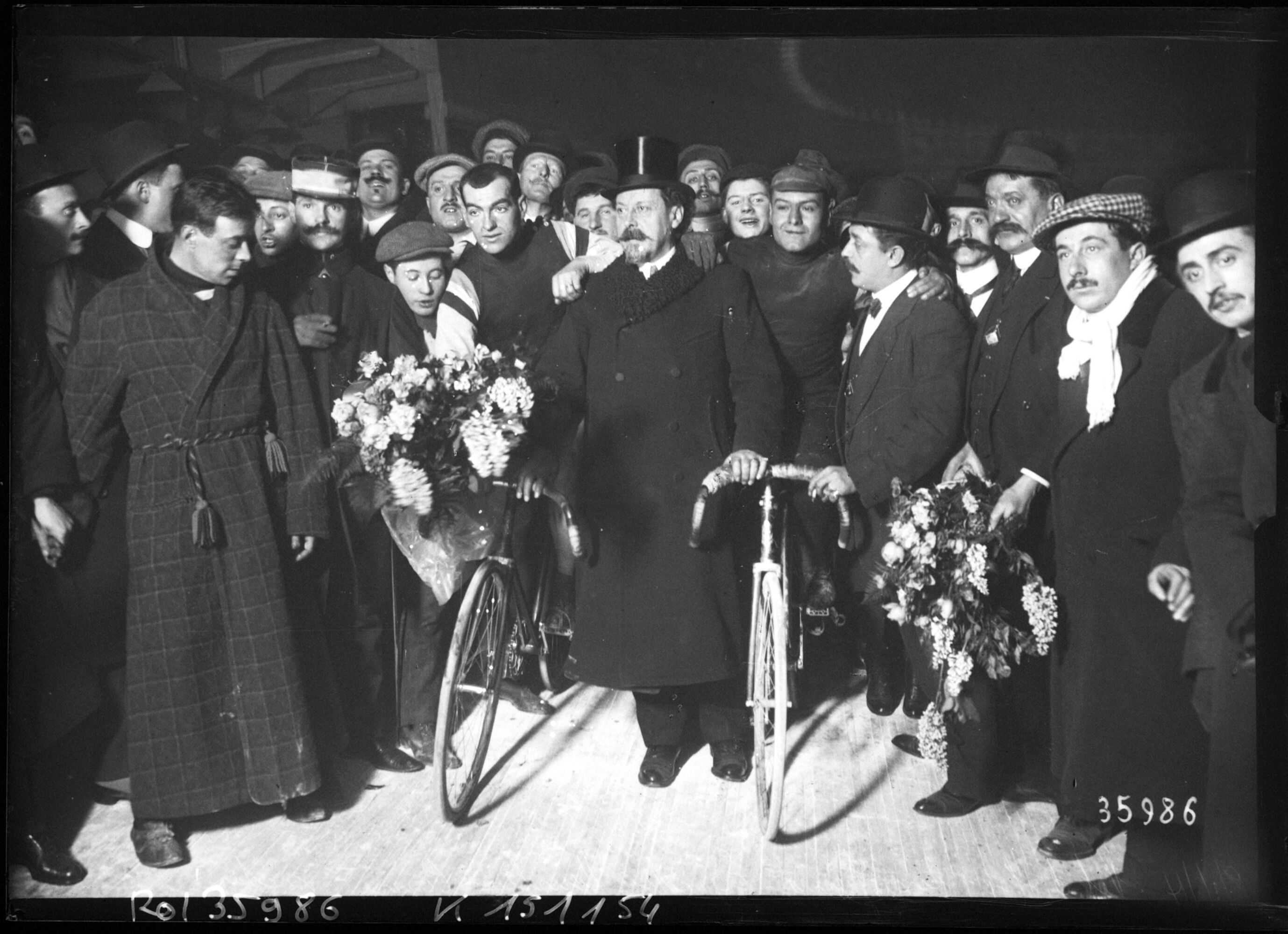
Léon Hourlier and Léon Comès, Paris Six Days, 1914

Léon Comès (11 February 1889 – 17 October 1915) was a French cyclist. He was born in Perpignan, France. Comès won the French national cycling championships in 1909, 1911 and 1914. He also won the French Grand Prix in 1914. Both Comès and his brother-in-law and fellow cyclist Léon Hourlier enlisted in the French military during World War I. They died together in a military air accident at Saint-Etienne-au-Temple in the Champagne district in France.

In 1908 he placed 3rd in the French National Championship sprint and the following year took 1st in the GP Angers spring. In 1914 he placed 1st, along with his brother-in-law Léon Hourlier, in the Paris Six Days.
