= Hilaire Hellebaut =

Belgian cyclist

Personal information
- Born: 19 October 1895
- Died: 18 May 1951 (aged 55)

Cycling career
- Sport: Cycling
- Role: Rider

Hilaire Hellebaut (19 October 1895 – 18 May 1951) was a Belgian racing cyclist. He rode in the 1922 Tour de France. He won the Ghent Lotto Six-Day in 1927, numerous podium finishes in the Tour of Flanders, Paris-Roubaix, Liège-Bastogne-Liège, Scheldeprijs, Tour of Belgium, Three Sister Cities, etc..Prof. rider 1920 - 1928
