= Manuel García Gargallo =

Spanish historian and writer

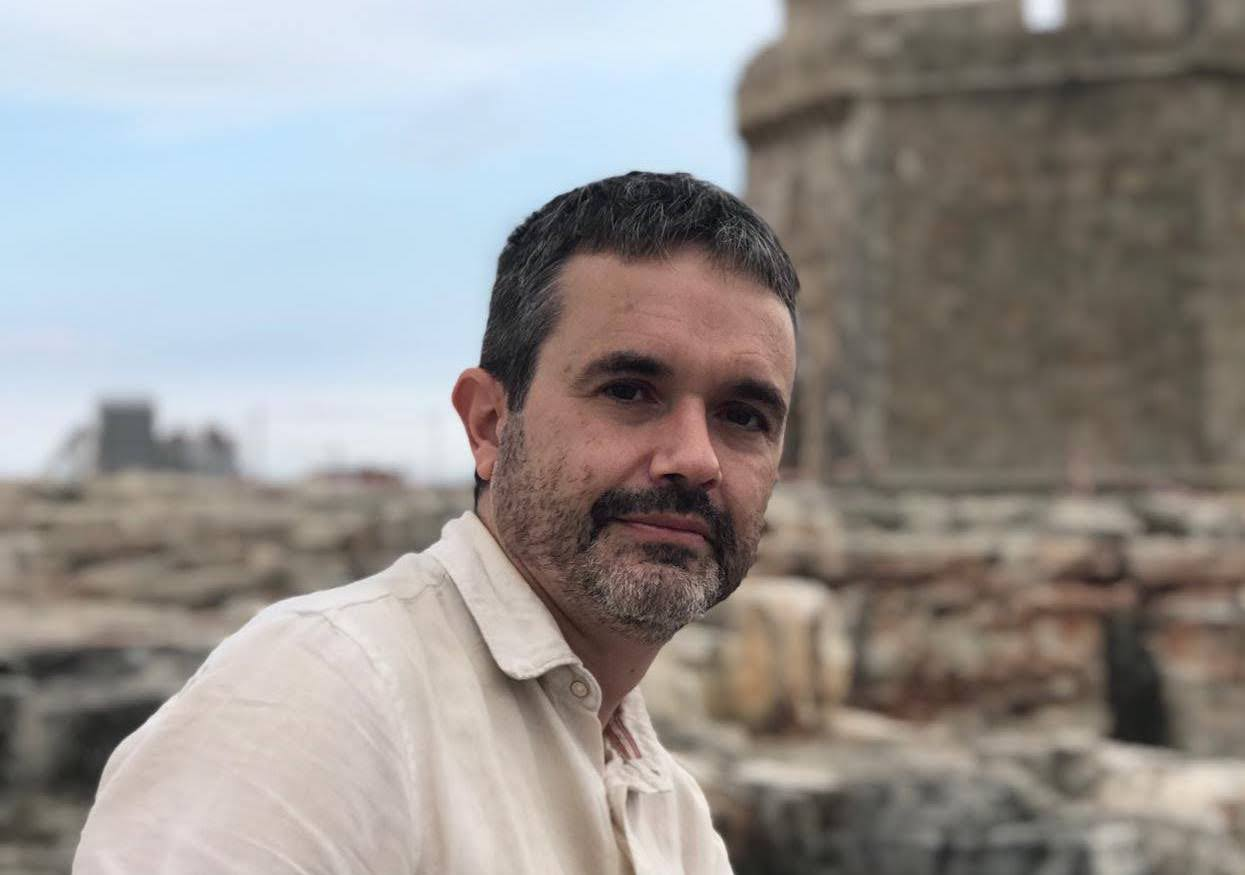
- Born: 24 June 1973 (age 53); Barcelona, Spain
- Occupations: historian, writer
- Writing career
- Language: Spanish, Catalan

Manuel García Gargallo (Barcelona, 24 June 1973) is a Spanish historian and writer.

He’s native of Sarrià (neighborhood of Barcelona), and he holds licenciate and doctorate in History from University of Barcelona (UB). He resides in Mallorca, where he initially specialized in history of local sports and later expanded his research to include a wider range of topics such as local culture, heritage, classical music, and current affairs. He has collaborated in various media in Balearic Islands and Aragon, such as Diario de Mallorca, Última Hora, El Periódico de Aragón, Ara Balears, IB3 Radio, Ona Mediterrània and Diario de Teruel. His work has helped to promote and highlight the historical and sporting heritage of Balearic Islands, notably Tirador Velodrome (Palma de Mallorca).

== Works ==
- García Gargallo, Manuel (2013). Els orígens de l'Atlètic Balears (1920-1942). Dels inicis a la fusió [The origins of Atlètic Balears (1920-1942). From the beginnings to the fusion] (in Catalan). Barcelona: Lulú. ISBN 978-84-09-43355-1.
- García Gargallo, Manuel; Vidal Perelló, Miguel (2017). 100 anys del Club Deportiu Consell. 1918-2018 [100 years of Club Deportiu Consell. 1918-2018] (in Catalan). Palma: Graficmon. ISBN 978-84-697-6479-4.
- García Gargallo, Manuel (2018). El velòdrom de Tirador. Una història de l'esport a Mallorca [The Velodrome of Tirador. A history of sport on Mallorca] (in Catalan). Palma: Illa Edicions. ISBN 978-84-947890-1-4.
- García Gargallo, Manuel (2018). Campeonatos Regionales de Baleares. Orígenes y desarrollo (1900-1940) [Regional Championships of the Balearic Islands. Origins and development (1900-1940)] (in Spanish). Madrid: CIHEFE. ISBN 978-84-948698-6-0.
- García Gargallo, Manuel (2020). L’Atlètic Balears (1920-1942): Els primers anys d'una entitat centenària [Atlètic Balears (1920-1942): The first years of a centenary entity] (in Catalan). Palma: Documenta Balear. ISBN 978-84-18441-08-0.
- García Gargallo, Manuel (2021). El Canòdrom Balear. Una historia del llebrer a Palma [The Balear Canodrome. A history of greyhound racing in Palma] (in Catalan). Palma: Documenta Balear. ISBN 978-84-18441-28-8.
- García Gargallo, Manuel (2022). El mundo sonoro del siglo XX. 101 obras clásicas para un siglo [The world of sounds in the 20th century. 101 classical works for a century] (in Spanish). Palma: Documenta Balear. ISBN 978-84-18441-71-4.
- García Gargallo, Manuel (2026). Cultura oberta, cultura desperta [Open culture, awake culture] (in Catalan). Palma: Documenta Balear. ISBN 978-84-19956-92-7.
- García Gargallo, Manuel (2026). Conocer Fuentes Claras. Historia, lugares, personajes [Discover Fuentes Claras: History, places, and people] (in Spanish). Zaragoza: Tipolinea. ISBN 979-13-991565-1-5.
