= Emil Richli =

Swiss cyclist

- Richli in 1928

Personal information
- Born: 24 October 1904 Zurich, Switzerland
- Died: 13 May 1934 (aged 29) Zürich, Switzerland

Cycling career
- Sport: Cycling

Emil Richli (24 October 1904 – 13 May 1934) was a Swiss cyclist. He competed in the team pursuit at the 1924 Summer Olympics.
