= Saint-Étienne-au-Temple =

- Commune
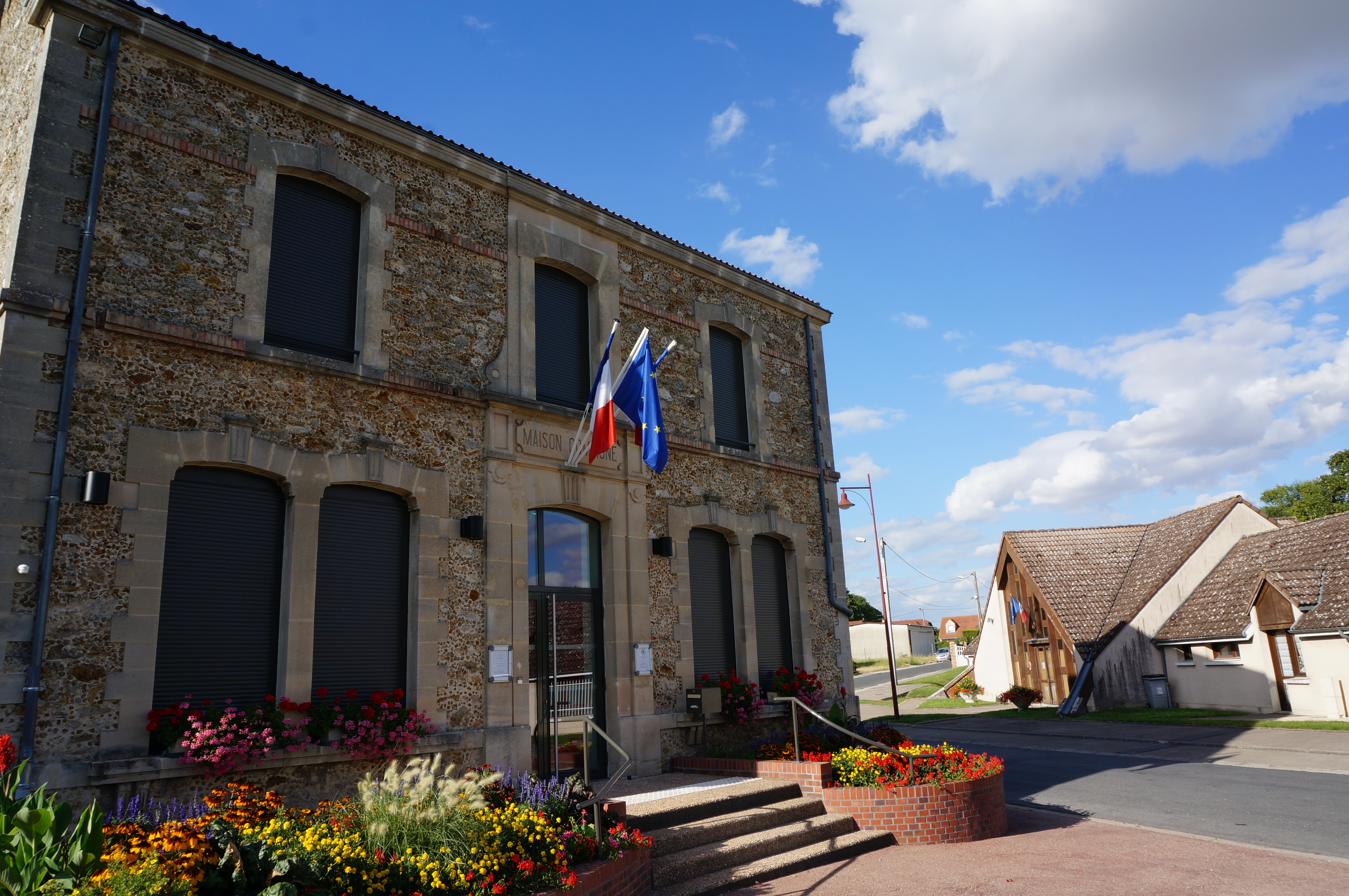
- The town hall in Saint-Étienne-au-Temple
- Location of Saint-Étienne-au-Temple
- Location within France Location within Grand Est
- Coordinates: 49°01′32″N 4°25′28″E
- Country: France
- Region: Grand Est
- Department: Marne
- Arrondissement: Châlons-en-Champagne
- Canton: Châlons-en-Champagne-3
- Intercommunality: CA Châlons-en-Champagne

Government
  - Mayor (2020–2026): Cyril Pointud
- Area^{1}: 11.94 km^{2} (4.61 sq mi)
- Elevation: 130 m (430 ft)
- Population (2023): 768
  - Density: 64.3/km^{2} (167/sq mi)
- Time zone: UTC+01:00 (CET)
  - Summer (DST): UTC+02:00 (CEST)
- INSEE/Postal code: 51476 /51460
- ^{1} French Land Register data, which excludes lakes, ponds, glaciers > 1 km^{2} (0.386 sq mi or 247 acres) and river estuaries.

Saint-Étienne-au-Temple (French pronunciation: [sɛ̃.t‿etjɛn o tɑ̃pl]) is a commune in the Marne department in north-eastern France.

== See also ==
- Communes of the Marne department
