= Frans Slaats =

Dutch cyclist (1912–1993)

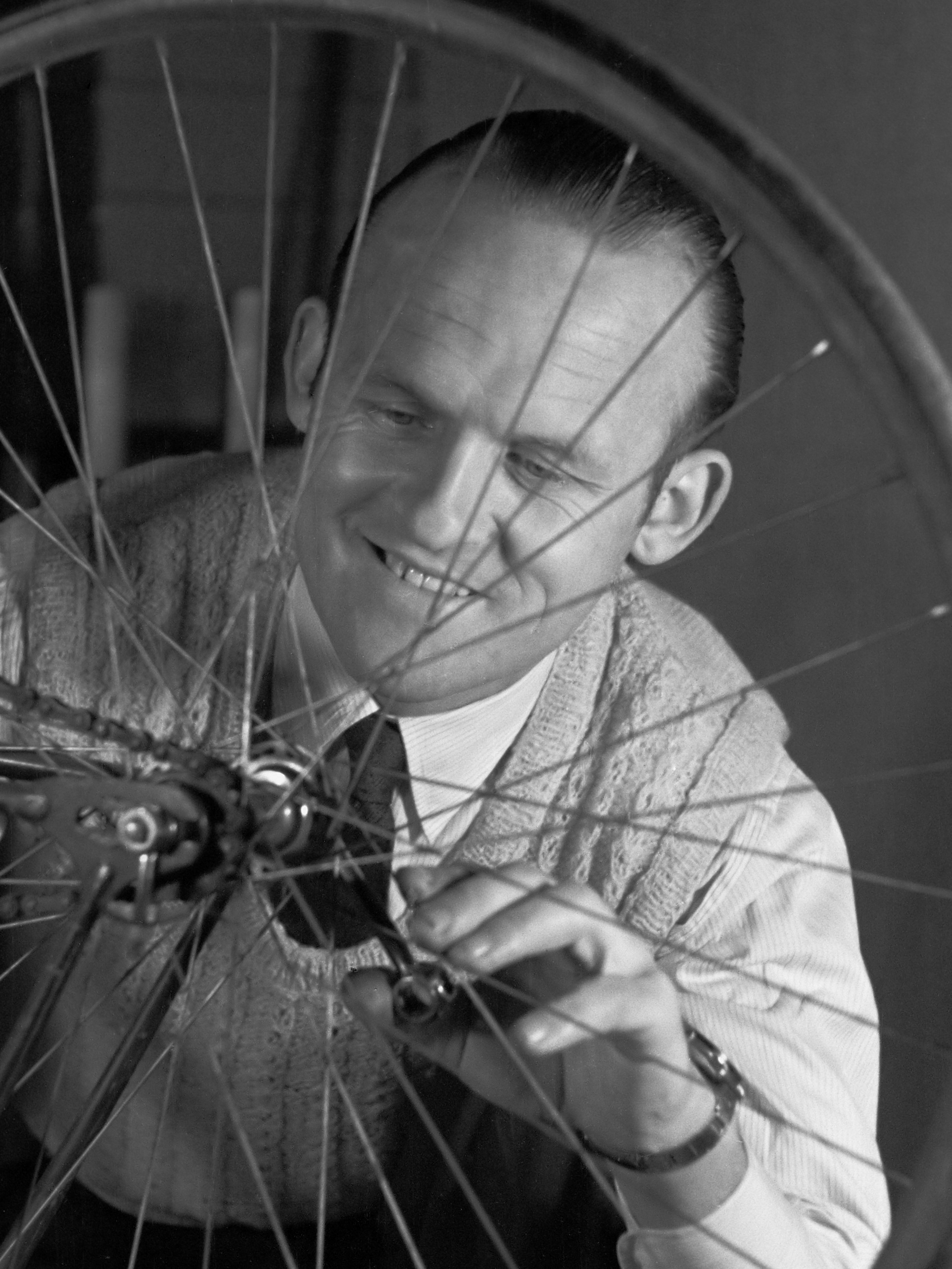
- Frans Slaats (1945)

Personal information
- Born: 11 June 1912 Waalwijk, Netherlands
- Died: 6 April 1993 (aged 80) Waalwijk, Netherlands

Cycling career
- Sport: Cycling
- Rider type: Rider

Frans Slaats (born Waalwijk, Netherlands, 11 June 1912, died Waalwijk, 6 April 1993) was a Dutch professional cyclist who broke the world hour record.

Slaats was a prominent velodrome rider in the 1930s, especially in six-day racing. In September 1937 he set the world hour record at 45.558 km on the Vigorelli track in Milan, Italy. It was bettered the same year by the French rider, Maurice Archambaud.

Slaats was at the Buenos Aires six-day in Argentina when World War II erupted in 1939. On returning to the Netherlands when peace came in 1945, he found his four brothers had been killed by the German army.

== Palmarès ==
1934
2nd Berlin six-day
1936
3rd Ronde van Valkenburg
1st Amsterdam six-day
2nd Ghent six-day
1st Copenhagen six-day
1937
1st Antwerp six-day
World hour record
1st Copenhagen six-day
1938
1st Ghent six-day
2nd Antwerp six-day
1939
1st Brussels six-day
3rd Copenhagen six-day
1944
1st Buenos Aires six-day

Records
Preceded by Maurice Richard	UCI hour record (45.325 km); 29 September 1937 – 3 November 1937	Succeeded by Maurice Archambaud
