= Tirador (velodrome) =

Velodrome in Palma, Spain

Velodrome of Tirador
- Tirador
- Interactive map of Velodrome of Tirador
- Location: 4 Miquel dels Sants Oliver; Palma de Mallorca; Balearic Islands, Spain
- Coordinates: 39.578678°N 2.644325°E
- Owner: Municipal property
- Capacity: 2,000 seats
- Surface: Cement
- Field size: 333,33 m.

Construction
- Built: 1898–1903
- Opened: 10 August 1903
- Renovated: 2026–2028 (public park)
- Closed: March 1973

Tirador (Catalan: Velòdrom del Tirador or Velòdrom de Tirador) is a velodrome in Palma (Mallorca, Balearic Islands, Spain). It is an outdoor track cycling, opened in 1903, and used to be the most important velodrome built in Spain for six decades until the construction of the Velódromo de Anoeta (San Sebastián) in 1965. Tirador was closed in 1973 and still exists but is no longer in use. It was the leading cycling track in Spain for six decades until the construction of Velódromo de Anoeta (San Sebastián) in 1965. Since 2015 is municipally owned, and in 2020 it was declared a Listed Building by the Palma City Council.

Closed for years, it suffered a process of abandonment and progressive degradation. The City Council planned to demolish it to build a green area; but it was saved in extremis thanks to the actions of various groups fighting for the conservation, such as the Associació de Veïns des Fortí and citizen initiatives, particularly the researcher Manuel García Gargallo, who achieved the preservation and publicized its historical and cultural value. This led Palma City Council, which had initially planned to demolish it to create a park, to rehabilitate it for the same purpose. This led to the withdrawal of the initial project in favor of another that preserves the track and will be carried out between 2027 and 2028 to incorporate it into the so-called Palma Urban Forest.

It has been one of the four cycling tracks in the city: Son Espanyolet (1893-1911), Son Moix (1987) and Palma Arena (2007).

== History ==
=== Origins and construction ===
Before the construction of the velodrome, this place had been owned by the carders' guild since the 14th century, being the place where they washed, stretched and dried the clothing. It owes its name to the process of stretching the clothing (tirar translating to 'stretching' in Old Catalan, and tirador to 'place where one stretches').

The Palma cyclist society Veloz Sport Balear was the driving force behind its construction. In the decade of the 1890s, track cycling was beginning to take hold on the island and, with it, several short slopes of poor quality were constructed. That is how the first velodrome of the capital was born: Son Espanyolet, inaugurated in 1893. Like the rest, its construction was technically deficient (it was reopened two times more to make up for its shortcomings) and Veloz Sport Balear (one of the tenants of the track) thought of building an enclosure of higher quality, in addition to doing it on their own land guarantee its durability. For this, the association acquired some land (then outside the walls) of the city, near the torrent of Sa Riera that formerly crossed the city.

The first stone of the velodrome was placed on 4 December 1898, but various circumstances (mainly lack of liquidity) interrupted the works on several occasions and prolonged them for almost five years, until the velodrome was inaugurated on 10 August 1903. After its inauguration, the activity in Son Espanyolet completely ceased, and shortly afterwards, it disappeared.

=== First years ===
Its inauguration was a national event, and very soon, Tirador became the reference track in Spain: The Spanish National Track Cycling Sprint Championship was held there in 1904, a tournament that had ceased to be disputed in 1897 because of the lack of an adequate track. At the same time, it propitiated the birth of the Spanish National Track Cycling Motor-Paced Championships in 1908, until then non-existent, since it was the most suitable track for the long-distance race dispute. Despite this, the cycling fans in Mallorca were going through a period of crisis and the amateur only responded to the big events, so during the rest of the year in the precinct was practiced all kinds of sports, especially football.

=== Years of splendor ===
The first years of the track contributed to the consolidation and development of the Mallorcan cycling fans and the emergence of the first local Spanish Championships from 1913. Since then, the Spanish track has been dominated by Mallorcan cyclists for decades, especially in the medium-depth category. Remarkable cyclists from this era include Simó Febrer "Guixer" and Miquel Bover Salom. In 1920, Veloz Sport Balear planned to replace the runway with a covered velodrome of greater capacity and functionality due to the success of the contested events, similar to Vélodrome d'Hiver of Paris (the Vél d'Hiv); but nothing happened, and the track remained the same.

Between 1921 and 1925 was closed by a federative sanction, and upon its reopening it regained its leadership in Spanish track cycling without problems. Successively, there were appearing tracks in Spain that could be an alternative, like the Velodrome of Ciudad Lineal (Madrid), the velodrome annexed to Estadio Torrero (Zaragoza) or the velodrome of Sants (Barcelona), which hosted several editions of the Spanish National Track Cycling Championships in the 1920s and 1930s. However, for various reasons, these were all of short duration, leaving Tirador as the only track of reference.

During the Spanish Civil War the track was practically inactive, but suffered no material damage. At the end of the war, the track recovered its activity with equal or greater force and, except for specific periods, during the 1940s and 1950s its cycling activity was constant at all levels. During these years the competition of foreign cyclists was scarce, first because the Second World War and then because the diplomatic isolation of the country. Cyclists that stood out in this era were the Mallorcan runners Miquel Llompart and Bartomeu Flaquer. During those years, new tracks appeared in Campos (1935), Tortosa (1943), Mataró (1948) and others of shorter voyage, which hosted important events and official championships with assiduity, but without ever challenging the Palma track for being the main reference.

The victory of the Mallorcan Guillem Timoner in the 1955 World Championship held in Milan was an accolade for the track, which since then entered the circuit of great tracks of the world attracted by the local champion, regular runner on the track. This also coincided with a generation of Mallorcan cyclists who achieved international relevance and helped to consolidate the international range of the track, like Pere Josep Gomila, Josep Escalas, Francesc Tortella, or the 1965 world champion, Miquel Mas.

From the 1950s, some projects were created to replace the velodrome with other facilities of greater capacity and functionality, once the worst postwar years were overcome, because of gradual aging of Tirador. Nevertheless, nothing would actually change, and the track survived. The moment of greatest danger was the ambitious municipal project planned in the 1960s by the mayor Màxim Alomar to cover the torrent of Sa Riera that crosses the city and passed by the side of the track, but that was finally discarded due to its high cost.

=== Decay and closure ===
The opening of the Velódromo de Anoeta (San Sebastián) in 1965, with the celebration of the World Championships the same year, marked the beginning of its decline. From then on, Tirador ceased to be the reference track in Spain and entered a process of irreversible decadence. It stopped receiving first level tournaments from 1968 (it would still host official Spanish National Championships until 1972). Its increasing deterioration and the generalized loss of interest in track competitions to the detriment of road cycling forced its definitive closure in March 1973. The last rehabilitation projects in collaboration with the Spanish or Balearic federations did not succeed and the construction of a new velodrome in the neighboring town of Algaida in 1975 buried it definitively in oblivion.

Since then, its owners, a Veloz Sport Balear in bad moments, dedicated the land to other uses. In 1999, paddle courts were built in the central space and a parking lot for the users, for which the runway was mutilated at the height of one of the cantons to allow access for the vehicles. And shortly after, another velodrome space was used as a municipal vehicle depot. Meanwhile, the track was abandoned and in a state of progressive degradation.

=== Expropriation and rehabilitation ===
Since the 1990s, the municipal government planned the construction of a large green area in the torrent of Sa Riera called Sa Falca Verda ('The Green Wedge'). The design of the park, in line with a project by Manuel Ribas i Piera and approved in 2002, contemplated the disappearance of the track, except for the Xalet of Gaspar Bennazar. In 2007 a first phase of the park was inaugurated, the so-called Parc de sa Riera (Sa Riera Park), and the expropriation procedures were continued for the second, among whose land was Tirador.

The judicial appeals filed by the affected owners and the delay in their resolution meant that the expropriation of the velodrome to be delayed until July 2015. However, the municipality was unable to act because the appraisal of the land and its subsequent payment were still pending a final judicial resolution. In short, Tirador was not entirely municipal until February 2019.

Meanwhile, the initial Sa Falca Verda project for the area had been scrapped. When the expropriation took place in 2015, the Palma City Council had replaced the initial design of Ribas i Piera with another that maintained the historic installation integrated in the future green area, plus the annexed site of the old Canòdrom Balear (an old greyhound track). The new design was in charge of the architect's studio Isabel Bennasar Félix and the green area was named Bosc Urbà (Urban Forest).

Due to the lack of maintenance until the expropriation of 2015 was final, the facilities underwent an accelerated process of degradation until finding themselves in an unfortunate state of neglect and dirt, in addition to the presence of squatters. Meanwhile, the project for the rehabilitation of the velodrome and the allocation of a budget for its execution were being processed.

Finally, on 22 May 2025 the preliminary project for the rehabilitation of the runway to convert it into a green area was presented, according to the design of architects Isabel Bennasar and Corina Dîndăreanu.

== Description ==
The track has a rope of 333.33 m and 6m wide, with two solid concrete banks (facing east and west) and stands on each side of the straight lines: main (north) and general (south), with capacity for approximately 2,000 spectators. Due to the elongated nature of the land acquired by Veloz Sport Balear, the ellipse of the track is longer than normal to adapt to the perimeter of the farm: its straights have a longer route and their supers are closed more than normal in addition to more being inclined, to compensate for its pronounced curvature. As a result, the central space has an approximate area of 110 by 33.3 m.

At the beginning of February 1918, Veloz Sport Balear undertook works to improve the facilities that included fixing the track, redoing the walls that surrounded it and renovating the covered grandstand on the Ponente canton, until then provisional. The architect Gaspar Bennazar, the city's municipal architect, was who designed the new covered grandstand on said camber. At the end of March, the works were well advanced, so in the short term it should have started working. The construction, in the shape of a rectangular temple, soon became known as es Xalet (the Chalet). In addition to serving as a grandstand, it also provided a cafeteria and terrace service for members, offering a privileged perspective of the cycling events that were held there. In the 1970s, when the velodrome ceased its activity, the building was renovated. The arches of the grandstand were bricked up and the building divided into two floors, to move the clubhouse of Veloz Sport Balear there.

Since its closure in 1973, the work as a whole (track, steps and Xalet) degraded progressively. Even so, the quality of the construction has meant that it is only superficial and that the whole structure remains intact. At the beginning of the 1990s, a vial was opened that carried the wall and part of the entrance gardens, but did not affect the rest of the group.

== Events ==
From its opening to its closure, the track hosted official events regularly and is probably the track that hosted the most official championships of Spain and Balearic Islands.

=== International competitions ===
Tirador organized tests with foreign runners very early on, since the first one went back to 1906. Although the participation of very first figures had to wait for the 1950s, thanks to the successes of whoever was six times UCI Motor-paced World Championships between 1955 and 1965, the Mallorcan Guillem Timoner.

On several occasions, the track hosted the old European Championship, and even a World Championship. But it never was highly successful, mainly due to the lack of resources of the Royal Spanish Cycling Federation to confront the company and the superiority of other countries in the economic sphere, logistics and sports. Also other factors, such as the outbreak of World War I, prevented its candidacy for the 1915 European and the 1917 World Championship from prospering.

=== National competitions ===
Since its inauguration, the velodrome has gained great prestige nationwide and regularly hosted the Spanish National Championships of sprint (since 1904) and Spanish National Championships of Motor-Paced (from 1908). Later he would do the same with the different modalities that arose, especially, from the 1940s: Commercial Motor-Paced (1941) or Pursuit (1949), both in professional and amateur categories in all cases.

- Spain Championship of Sprint: 1904, 1914, 1916, 1919, 1920, 1921, 1931, 1934, 1935, 1939, 1940, 1941, 1944, 1947, 1948, 1950 and 1956.
- Spain Championship of Stayer Motor-paced: 1908 (*), 1913, 1914, 1915, 1916, 1917, 1918, 1919, 1920, 1921, 1926, 1927, 1929, 1931, 1934, 1940, 1941, 1943, 1945, 1946, 1947 and 1949.
- Spain Championship of Stayer Motor-paced (amateurs): 1972.
- Spain Championship of Commercial Motor-paced: 1941 (*), 1944, 1959, 1960, 1961, 1962, 1963, 1964, 1968, 1969, 1970 and 1972.
- Spain Championship of Commercial Motor-paced (amateurs): 1957 (*), 1958, 1959, 1960, 1963, 1964, 1968 and 1969.
- Spain Championship of individual Pursuit: 1949 (*), 1954, 1956, 1957, 1959, 1960, 1961, 1962, 1963 and 1964.
- Spain Championship of individual Pursuit (amateurs): 1958, 1959, 1960 and 1970.
- Spain Championship of Long-distance: 1941 (*), 1962 and 1963.
- Spain Championship of Long-distance (amateurs): 1964.

(*) first edition of the modality.

In the 1960s participated in the Intervelodromes Tournament, a competition in league format that faced teams attached to different tracks of the Spanish geography. The Balearic team, who ran in Tirador, won the first edition (1965).

=== Regional competitions ===
The Balearic Championship of Sprint was held for its inauguration, and since then it has been regularly held there. Balearic Championship of Long-distance since its creation in 1912, as well as the rest of the modalities that emerged later as in the national case. In this case, Tirador had to rival the profusion of tracks of Mallorca, especially with the velodrome of Campos.

- Balearic Championship of Sprint: 1903, 1905, 1906, 1908, 1912, 1913, 1916, 1917, 1919, 1920, 1925, 1926, 1932, 1935, 1939, 1944, 1945 and 1966.
- Balearic Championship of Sprint (amateurs): 1955 (*), 1956, 1957 and 1966.
- Balearic Championship of Long-distance: 1912 (*), 1913, 1917, 1919, 1920, 1925, 1926, 1928, 1931, 1938, 1939, 1942, 1944, 1956 and 1963.
- Balearic Championship of Long-distance (amateurs): 1954 (*), 1958, 1959 and 1972.
- Balearic Championship of Stayer Motor-paced: 1930 (*), 1931, 1932, 1933, 1934, 1935, 1936, 1941 and 1946.
- Balearic Championship of Commercial Motor-paced: 1941 (*), 1943, 1958, 1959, 1965, 1971 and 1972.
- Balearic Championship of Commercial Motor-paced (amateurs): 1956 (*), 1958, 1959, 1970 and 1971.
- Balearic Championship of Individual Pursuit: 1956 (*), 1957 and 1966.
- Balearic Championship of individual Pursuit (amateurs): 1955 (*), 1956, 1957, 1958, 1966, 1970 and 1972.
- Balearic Championship of Madison: 1966 (*) and 1972.
- Balearic Championship of Km Standing Start: 1972 (*).

(*) first edition of the modality.

=== Women's Cycling ===
During the years of activity of Tirador, the tests were carried out only by male cyclists. The exception was the visit of the Italian Alfonsina Strada, a pioneer of women's cycling in her time, who ran in 1926. No official women's events were organized, since they began to be held at Mallorca starting 1979 and the regional championships on track starting the following year, when the velodrome had already been closed.

=== Other sports ===
When the track was built, cycling was the only sport with certain roots and the practice of other sports was still scarce, and there were hardly any spaces for their practice. This turned Tirador into the main sports space in which the majority of sports developed as they arrived on the island.

- Athletics. Since 1917, tournaments of pedestrianism were disputed, which continued in the following years.
- Basketball. Basketball was first played in 1938 on an outdoor track. Veloz Sport Balear had a team federated between 1942 and 1945 that played in this pitch.
- Boxing. Although this sport was developed in other spaces of the city during the 1930s, some fighting was initially disputed on the track. The exhibition of the former heavyweight world champion, Jack Johnson, in 1917, stands out.
- Football. Football arrived to Mallorca in 1903 and the central space within Tirador was the only existing playing field in Palma for years. The football section of Veloz Sport Balear used to be the most powerful team on the island until the birth of RCD Mallorca in 1916 and the construction of the first regulatory playing field that same year. Also in Tirador, Baleares FC (currently CD Atlético Baleares) played its first match in 1920 and continued playing here until moving to the Unión-Baleares field in 1923.
- Motorcycling. Motorcycle tests were disputed, especially in the early years of the track.
- Other sports: Roller Skating, tennis, pigeon shooting.

=== Social acts ===
Apart from the sports slope, the velodrome was a social meeting point as it was the main outdoor space suitable for mass events. Fireworks, concerts, and shows were common, especially during the first third of the 20th century.

== Patrimonial value ==
Tirador is the oldest cycling track in Spain. It is followed by the velodrome of Campos (1935) and later on the tracks of Tortosa (1943) and Mataró (1948). At the moment it is the oldest sport enclosure that is conserved in Mallorca and one of the oldest in Spain.

At the world level, it is the twelfth oldest runway in the world (see List of oldest cycling tracks and velodromes), surpassed only by four United Kingdom velodromes (built between 1877 and 1900), six French ones (between 1884 and 1897) and one Hungarian one (1896). All of them are in use and, for this reason, they have been modernized to varying degrees for their use; unlike Tirador, which is preserved almost as when it was inaugurated in 1903.

The failing of projects for its extension or substitution (first) and the relative abandonment (after) in the 1950s were already qualified to the track as old-made that Tirador remained almost unchanged as is since its inauguration, except surface arrangements for its basic maintenance.

A series of articles in the press since 2014 demonstrated the idiosyncrasy of the track and its value and heritage. This helped to spread the importance of Tirador among those who were unaware of its existence, or recovered it for those old fans who believed that it had disappeared. In 2018 a book was presented that compiles the history of the velodrome, from the origins to the present.

=== Cataloging ===
Due to its historical value, since 2014 there have been initiatives to catalogue the velodrome as a protected property.

- The Palma City Council, in the plenary session of 29 May 2014, unanimously approved a proposal for the heritage cataloging of the Xalet and the conservation of the track as a public space.
- The Palma City Council announced on 20 October 2015 its cataloging and inclusion in the catalog of protected buildings, but it was never realized.
- The Mallorca Insular Council, in the plenary session of 16 October 2018, unanimously approved a similar proposal urging the City Council to catalog the site entirely; otherwise, the Insular Council will start the procedures for its patrimonial protection.
- The preservationist association Hispania Nostra included it on 26 November 2019 in its list of assets in danger of disappearance.
- The Palma City Council, in the plenary session of 19 December 2019, unanimously approved a proposal for the cataloging of the entire space.
- The Palma City Council in the plenary session on 30 April 2020 approved the provisional cataloging of the velodrome and definitively on 17 December 2020, unanimously by all municipal groups.
- Finally, the cataloging was official since its publication in the Official Gazette of the Balearic Islands (BOIB), on 18 February 2021.

== Deadly accidents ==
During the seventeen years of activity of the velodrome there were a total of five fatalities:

- Antoni Parets Coll, 21 August 1927 when, as a motor-paced rider, he drove into cyclist Gaspar Pocoví in a race.
- Josep Nicolau i Balaguer nicknamed es Canó de Llorito (the cannon of Llorito), 18 November 1934 (26 years old), when the Spanish National Track Cycling Motor-Paced Championships was held.
- Rafel Pou Sastre, 27 May 1936 (27 years old), when training with a motorcycle.
- Pere Bover Pons, son of Miquel Bover Salom es Sardiner, 15 May 1940 (18 years old), when he was competing in an American-style race.
- Willy Lauwers (Belgium), 12 April 1959 (22 years old), in a motor-paced race.

== See also ==
- List of cycling tracks and velodromes

== Bibliography ==
- García-Gargallo, Manuel (2018). El velòdrom de tirador. Una història de l'esport a Mallorca (in Catalan). Palma: Illa Edicions. ISBN 978-84-947890-1-4.
