= Robert Naeye =

American astronomers

- Born: Burlington, Vermont
- Education: Oberlin College; Boston University
- Scientific career
- Fields: Science journalism
- Institutions: Discover magazine; Astronomy magazine; Mercury magazine; NASA Goddard Space Flight Center; Sky & Telescope magazine

Robert Naeye is an American science journalist and former magazine editor.

== Early life ==
He was born in Burlington, Vermont and raised in Hershey, Pennsylvania. He currently lives just outside Hershey.

His ancestry can be traced to the Flanders region of Belgium and other places in Northern Europe. He is unrelated to the Belgian cyclist of the same name Robert Naeye.

== Education ==
He completed and undergraduate degree at Oberlin College and a master's degree in science journalism at Boston University.

== Career ==
=== Publications and NASA ===
He has worked as a Researcher/Reporter at Discover magazine, Senior Editor at Astronomy magazine, Editor in Chief of Mercury magazine, Senior Editor and later Editor in Chief of Sky & Telescope magazine, and Senior Science Writer for the Astrophysics Science Division at NASA Goddard Space Flight Center in Greenbelt, Maryland. He has also written numerous freelance articles for a variety of print and online publications.

== Bibliography ==
He has contributed to four books and authored two other books:

- Through the Eyes of Hubble: The Birth, Life, and Violent Death of Stars
- Signals from Space: The Chandra X-ray Observatory

== Awards and honours ==
- In 2002, the Astronomical Association of Northern California honored him with its Professional Astronomer of the Year Award
- In 2002, the American Astronomical Society's High-Energy Astrophysics Science Division honored him with the David N. Schramm Award for Science Journalism
- In 2019, the Pennsylvania NewsMedia Association honored him with the Keystone Press Award for Investigative Journalism, Division VI (First Place)
