= Jean Roth =

Swiss cyclist (1924–2019)

Personal information
- Born: 3 March 1924 Le Havre, France
- Died: 2019 (aged 94–95)

Cycling career
- Sport: Cycling

Jean Roth (3 March 1924 – 2019) was a Swiss cyclist. He competed in the sprint and tandem events at the 1948 Summer Olympics.

== Biography ==
Jean Roth was born in Le Havre, in Upper Normandy, France, on 3 March 1924. He retired from professional cycling in 1961. He died in 2019.
