= Gerard Peters =

Dutch cyclist (1920–2005)

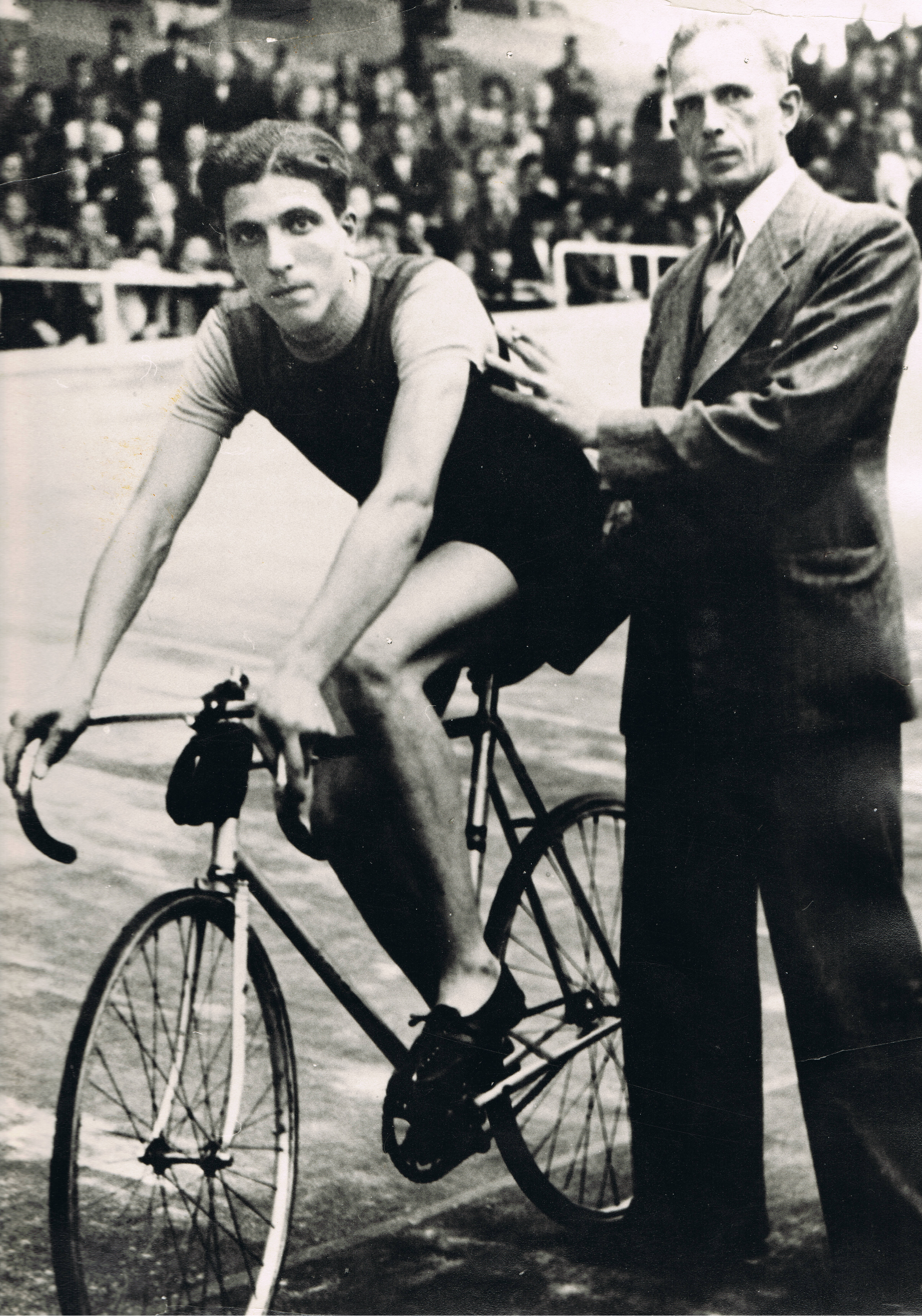
- Peters in 1946

Personal information
- Born: 31 July 1920 Haarlem, the Netherlands
- Died: 6 April 2005 (aged 84) Haarlem, the Netherlands

Sport
- Sport: Cycling
Medal record
Representing the Netherlands
World Track Championships
Gold medal – first place	1946 Zürich	Individual pursuit
European Track Championships
Gold medal – first place	1950	Madison

Gerard "Gerrit" Peters (31 July 1920 – 6 April 2005) was a Dutch track and road cyclist who was active between 1941 and 1956. On track he won the world title in the individual pursuit in 1946 and the European title in madison in 1950. On the road, he won six six-day races, in Ghent (1950), Paris (1950, 1953), Berlin (1954), Antwerpen (1954) and Münster (1955). He also rode in the 1951 Tour de France.
