= Albert (given name) =

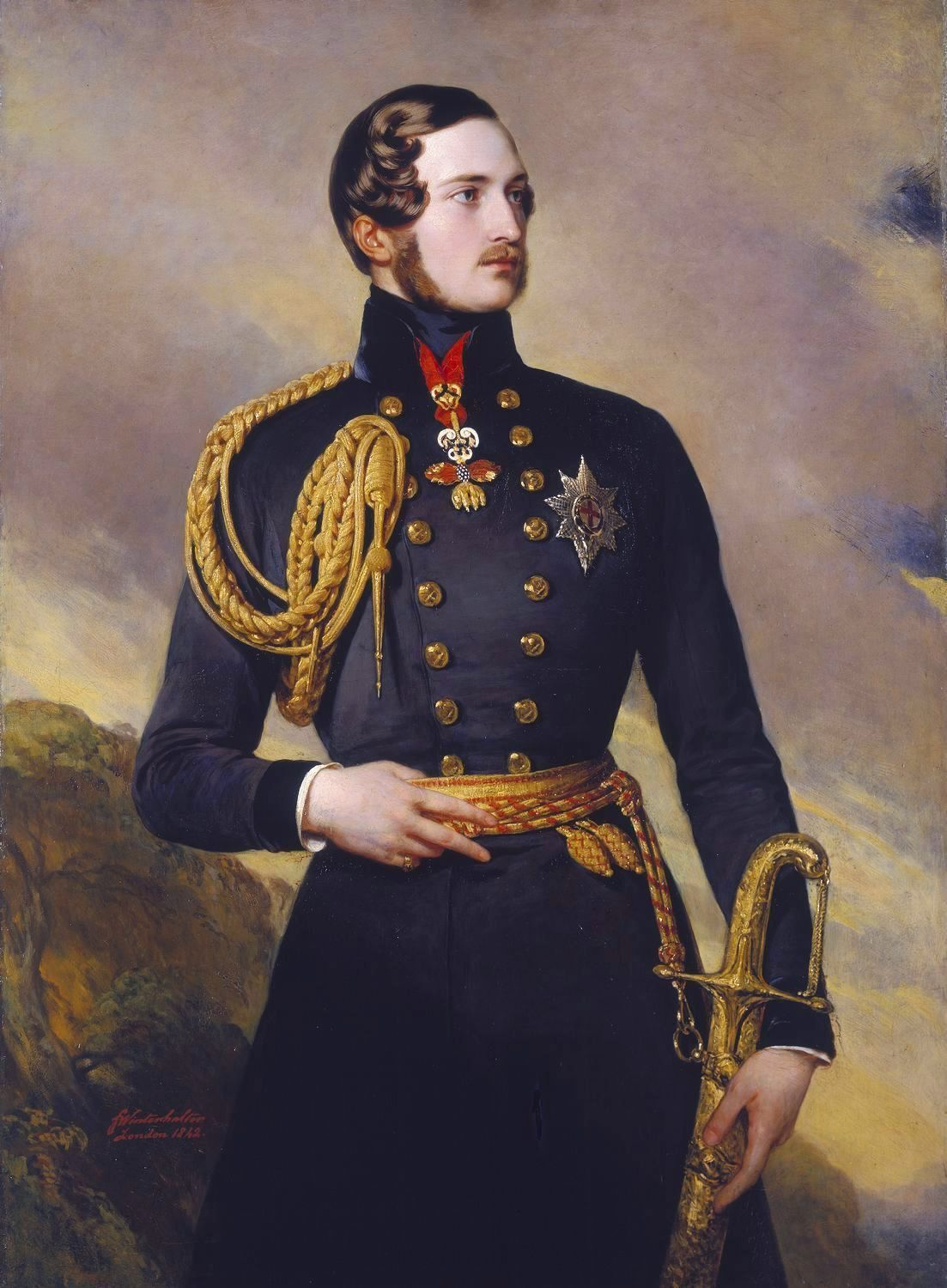
- Prince Albert of Saxe-Coburg and Gotha, who popularised the name in the British Empire
- Pronunciation: English: /ˈælbərt/ AL-bərt; French: [albɛʁ] German: [ˈalbɛʁt] Danish: [ˈælˀpɐt]
- Gender: Male
- Language: Germanic
- Name day: November 15

Origin
- Meaning: Noble and bright

Other names
- Related names: Al (nickname), Ab, Abert, Bert, Adalbert, Adalberto, Albertson, Adelbert, Delbert, Adbert, Elbert, Alberto, Albrecht, Alprecht, Alpert

Albert is a masculine given name. It is derived from the Germanic Adalbert and Adelbert, containing the words adal ("noble") and beraht ("bright"). It is also less commonly used as a surname. Feminine forms of the name, such as "Alberta" are relatively uncommon and are declining in use.

== Translations ==
- Albanian: Albert
- Arabic: ألبرت (Albirt), ألبير (Albīr)
- Armenian: Ալբերտ (Albert)
- Azerbaijani: Albert
- Bengali: আলবার্ট (Albart), (Ālabārṭa)
- Breton: Alberzh
- Catalan: Albert
- Simplified Chinese: 阿尔伯特（Āěrbótè）
- Circassian: Альберт (Albert)
- Croatian: Albert
- Czech: Albert, Vojtěch
- Danish: Albert
- Dutch: Albert, Aalbert, Alberta
- Estonian: Albert
- Finnish: Albert, Alpertti
- French: Albert, pronounced [albeʁ]
- Galician: Alberte, Alberto and Albertos
- Valencian: Albert
- Georgian: ალბერტი (Alberti)
- German: Albert, Albrecht
- Greek: Αλβέρτος (Alvértos)
- Gujarati: આલ્બર્ટ (Ālbarṭa)
- Hebrew: אלברט (Albert)
- Hindi: अल्बर्ट (Albarṭa)
- Icelandic: Albert
- Indonesian: Albert
- Irish: Ailbe, Ailbhe
- Italian: Alberto
- Japanese: アルバート (Arubāto)
- Kannada: ಆಲ್ಬರ್ಟ್ (Ālbarṭ)
- Khmer: អាល់ប៊ើត (Albeut)
- Korean: 알버트 (Albeoteu)
- Latin: Albertus
- Latvian: Alberts
- Lithuanian: Albertas
- Mongolian: Альберт (Alibyert)
- Nepali: अल्बर्ट (Albarṭa)
- Norwegian: Albert
- Old English: Æthelberht
- Persian: آلبرت
- Polish: Albert, Olbracht
- Portuguese: Alberto
- Punjabi: ਐਲਬਰਟ (Ailabaraṭa)
- Romanian: Albert
- Russian: Альберт, romanized: Al'bert
- Serbian: Алберт/Albert
- Slovak: Albert
- Slovene: Albert
- Spanish: Alberto
- Swedish: Albert
- Syriac: ܐܠܒܪܬ (Albert)
- Tamil: ஆல்பர்ட் (Ālparṭ)
- Thai: อัลเบิร์ต (Xạlbeir̒)
- Turkish: Albert
- Tatar: Альберт (Albert)
- Ukrainian: Альберт, romanized: Al'bert
- Urdu: البرٹ
- Yiddish: אַלבערט

== People named Albert ==
=== Royalty ===
- Albert of Austria (disambiguation)
- St. Albert (disambiguation)
- Prince Albert (disambiguation)
- King Albert (disambiguation)
- Albert of Aix (c. 1100), historian of the first crusade
- Albert I of Brandenburg (c. 1100–1170) Margrave of Brandenburg from 1157 to 1170 and duke of Saxony from 1138 to 1142
- Albert of Riga (c. 1165–1229), third Bishop of Riga in Livonia, founder of the city of Riga, one of the principal commanders of Livonian Crusade
- Albert III of Habsburg
- Albert IV of Habsburg
- Albert of Saxony, King of Saxony, one of the principal commanders of Austro-Prussian War, Battle of Gitschin, Battle of Königgrätz, Battle of Sedan and Siege of Paris (1870–1871)
- Albert of Brunswick and Lunenburg-Wolfenbüttel (died 1395), as Albert II Prince-Archbishop of Bremen
- Albert II of Meissen (c. 1240–1314), the son of Henry III of Meißen and Constantia of Austria
- Albert, King of Sweden (1338–1412), king of Sweden
- Albert, Duke of Saxony (1443–1500), the younger son of Frederick II the Gentle
- Albert VII of Austria (1559–1621), ruling Archduke of Austria, one of the principal commanders of Dutch Revolt
- Albert of Mainz (1490–1545), Elector and Archbishop of Mainz from 1514 to 1545 and Archbishop of Magdeburg from 1513 to 1545
- Albert, Duke of Prussia (1490–1568), Grand Master of the Teutonic Order before converting to Lutheranism and becoming the first duke of Ducal Prussia
- Albert Alcibiades (1522–1557), Margrave of Brandenburg-Kulmbach
- Prince Albert of Saxe-Coburg and Gotha (1819–1861), Consort of Queen Victoria of the United Kingdom
- Albert, 4th duc de Broglie (1821–1901), French monarchist politician
- Albert, King of Saxony (1828–1873)
- Albert I of Monaco (1848–1922), the reigning Prince of Monaco from September 10, 1889, to June 26, 1922
- Albert I of Belgium (1875–1934), the third King of the Belgians
- Albert II of Belgium (born 1934), the 6th King of the Belgians
- Albert II of Monaco (born 1958), the head of the House of Grimaldi and the current ruler of the Principality of Monaco
- Christian Albert, Duke of Holstein-Gottorp (1641–1695)
- Albert I, Duke of Saxony (1175–1260), one of the principal commanders of Livonian Crusade
- Albert Alcibiades, Margrave of Brandenburg-Kulmbach (1522–1557), one of the principal commanders of Battle of Sievershausen
- Albert Anton, Prince of Schwarzburg-Rudolstadt (1641–1710), Count of Schwarzburg-Rudolstadt (1662–1710)
- Albert Augustus of Isenburg-Wächtersbach, German count of Isenburg-Wächtersbach (1780–1782)
- Albert Azzo I of Milan (c. 970–1029), Italian nobleman
- Albert Azzo II of Milan (997/1009–1097), Italian nobleman
- Albert Bogátradvány (died after 1239), Hungarian nobleman
- Albert Casimir, Duke of Teschen (1738–1822), Saxon prince
- Albert Frederick, Duke of Prussia (1553–1618), the 2nd Duke of Prussia
- Charles Albert of Sardinia, King of Sardinia, one of the principal commanders of First Italian War of Independence
- Archduke Albrecht, Duke of Teschen, one of the principal commanders of Battle of Custoza (1866) and Austro-Prussian War
- Albert Casimir, Duke of Teschen, Governor of the Austrian Netherlands, one of the principal commanders of Battle of Jemappes
- Albert Spencer, 7th Earl Spencer (1892–1975), British peer
- Albert the Bear, first margrave of Brandenburg, one of the principal commanders of Second Crusade
- Albert Wolfgang, Count of Hohenlohe-Langenburg (1659–1715), Eldest child of Count Henry Frederick, Count of Hohenlohe-Langenburg and Countess Juliana Dorothea of Castell-Remlingen
- Albert Wolfgang, Count of Schaumburg-Lippe (1699–1748), ruler of the County of Schaumburg-Lippe

==== A–D ====
- Albert (1789–1865), stage name of ballet dancer, François-Ferdinand Decombe
- Albert Aalbers (1897–1961), Dutch architect
- Albert Leigh Abbott (1890–1952), British architect, Royal Regiment officer, and Military Cross recipient
- Albert Abicht (1893–1973), German farmer and politician
- Albert Abongo (born 1959), Ghanaian politician and civil engineer
- Albert Abotsi (born 1981), Ghanaian weightlifter
- Albert Abramovitz (1879–1963), American artist and painter
- Albert Abrams (1863–1924), American physician
- Albert Abreu (born 1995), Dominican major league baseball pitcher
- Albert Acevedo (born 1983), Chilean footballer
- Albert Achard (1894–1972), French World War I flying ace
- Albert Ackroyd, English rugby league footballer
- Albert Wojciech Adamkiewicz (1850–1921), Polish pathologist
- Albert J. Adams (1845–1906), American racketeer
- Albert "Bert" Addinall (1925–2001), English footballer
- Albert Christopher Addison (1862–1935), English writer and historian
- Albert Adeogun, Nigerian politician
- Albert Adomah (born 1987), English footballer
- Albert Adomakoh (1922–2016), Ghanaian economist, Governor of Bank of Ghana from 1965 to 1968
- Albert Adrià (born 1969), Spanish chef
- Albert Aduloju Agbaje (1937–2005), Nigerian Anglican Bishop
- Albert Aereboe (1889–1970), German painter
- Albert Aernoult (1886–1909), French ditch digger
- Albert Aeschmann (1900–?), Swiss weightlifter
- Albert Aftalion (1974–1956), French economist
- Albert Agarunov (1969–1992), Azerbaijani Army soldier
- Albert Aguayo (born 1934), Canadian neurologist
- Albert Aguilà (born 1970), Spanish footballer and football manager
- Albert Agyemang (born 1977), Ghanaian sprinter
- Albert W. Aiken (1846–1894), American actor, author, and playwright
- Albert Ajaiso (born 1986), French footballer
- Albert Ákos (died after 1276), Hungarian Master of the horse
- Albert Akst (1899–1958), American musician, film editor, and saxophonist
- Albert Alain (1880–1971), French organist and composer
- Albert Alarr (born 1956), American television director and producer
- Albert Alavedra (born 1999), Andorran footballer
- Albert Alberts (1911–1995), Dutch writer, translator, and journalist
- Albert Alcalay (1917–2008), American abstract artist
- Albert Alden (1813–1892), American congressman from Wisconsin
- Albert Alden (1887–1965), English cyclist
- Albert Alderman (1907–1990), English cricketer and footballer
- Albert K. Aldinger (1873–1957), American football, basketball, and baseball player and coach
- Albert Aldridge (1864–1891), English footballer
- Albert Alejo (born 1958), Filipino Jesuit, anthropologist, activist, and Tagalog poet
- Albert Alexander (1896–1941), English police officer who was the first patient to be treated with injections of penicillin
- Albert Alexander Sr. (1867–1953), English footballer
- Albert Ernest Alexander (1914–1970), British-Australian chemist
- Albert R. Alexander (1859–1966), Canadian-American judge
- Albert Aley (1919–1986), American producer, screenwriter, script doctor, and story editor
- Albert Allard (1860–1941), Canadian politician and businessman
- Albert Allen (1867–1899), English footballer
- Albert Arthur Allen (1886–1962), American photographer and film director
- Albert Allnutt (1892–1963), Australian politician
- Albert Alloo (1893–1955), New Zealand cricketer and lawyer
- Albert L. Allred (born 1931), American chemist
- Albert Almanza (1936–2023), Mexican basketball player
- Albert Almora (born 1994), American major league baseball player
- Albert Almoznino (1923–2020), Israeli hand shadow artist
- Albert Alter (born 1947/1948), American clown
- Albert L. Altman (1853–1903), Irish entrepreneur and businessman
- Albert Jean Amateau (1889–1996), Turkish rabbi, businessman, lawyer, and social activist
- Albert Ambler (1892–1970), Australian cricketer
- Albert Ammann (1860–1929), Swiss politician, President of the Swiss Council of States (1905–1906)
- Albert Ammons (1907–1949), American pianist
- Albert Amrhein (1870–1945), German rugby union player
- Albert Anae (born 1989), New Zealand-Australian rugby union footballer
- Albert Anastasia (1902–1957), Italian-American mobster, hitman, and crime boss
- Albert Andersen (1891–1977), Danish long-distance runner
- Albert Anderson (1876–1948), American judge
- Albert Anderson (1889–1944), Irish cricketer
- Albert Anderson (1907–1986), Irish politician and businessman
- Albert Anderson (born 1961), New Zealand rugby union player
- Albert "Al" Anderson (born 1950), American songwriter and guitarist
- Albert B. Anderson (1857–1938), American circuit judge from Indiana
- Albert E. Anderson (1885–1966), American lawyer and politician from Maine
- Albert R. Anderson (1837–1898), American congressman from Iowa
- Albert Andersson (1865–1915), Swedish missionary
- Albert Andersson (1878–1962), Swedish politician
- Albert Andersson (1902–1977), Swedish gymnast
- Albert Ando (1929–2002), Japanese-American economist
- Albert André (1869–1954), French painter
- Albert Andrews (1881–1960), Canadian politician from Alberta
- Albert LeRoy Andrews (1878–1961), American Germanic philologist and bryologist
- Albert Andreyev (born 1968), Russian footballer
- Albert Androt (1781–1804), French composer
- Albert Angell (1660–1705), Norwegian civil servant, landowner, and businessman
- Albert H. Angstman (1888–1964), Justice of the Montana Supreme Court
- Albert Anis (1889–1964), American architect
- Albert Anker (1831–1910), Swiss painter and illustrator
- Albert T. Annexstad, American businessman and philanthropist
- Albert Edward Anson (1879–1936), British actor
- Albert Antébi (1873–1919), Turkish Jewish public activist and community leader
- Albert Anthony (born c. 1839), Lenape missionary and scholar
- Albert Apponyi (1846–1933), Hungarian aristocrat and politician
- Albert Apuzzi, American pharmacist and handball player
- Albert Ernest Archer (1878–1949), Canadian physician and political activist
- Albert Arenas (born 1996), Spanish motorcycle racer
- Albert Arents (1840–1914), German-American metallurgist
- Albert Arlen (1905–1993), Turkish-Australian pianist, composer, actor, and playwright
- Albert Armitage (1864–1943), Scottish polar explorer and Merchant Navy officer
- Albert Arnal (1913–1966), Valencian handball player
- Albert Arnheiter (1890–1945), German rower
- Albert Nicholas Arnold (1814–1883), American Baptist minister
- Albert Arntgolts (born 1937), Soviet and Russian stage actor
- Albert Arnulf (1898–1984), French engineer and physicist
- Albert Arnz (1832–1914), German painter
- Albert Arrowsmith, Australian rugby league footballer
- Albert Arthur (died 1944), English Royal Air Force Flying Officer who was a George Medal recipient
- Albert Arutiunov (1930–2014), Armenian chess master and coach
- Albert Asadullin (born 1948), Soviet and Russian Tatar singer and tenor altino
- Albert Asher (1879–1965), New Zealand rugby union and rugby league footballer
- Albert Ashwood (born 1959), American Emergency Management Official from Oklahoma
- Albert Aspinall (1839–1903), Australian stonemason and builder
- Albert Asriyan (1951–2007), Armenian-American violinist, composer, arranger, and band leader
- Albert Assor (1895–1943), Estonian politician, Minister of Justice (1938–1940)
- Albert Atkey (1867–1947), English politician
- Albert Atkins (1867–1943), Australian cricketer
- Albert Atkinson (c. 1909–1953), English rugby league footballer
- Albert Attalla (1931–2014), American nuclear scientist
- Albert Atterberg (1846–1916), Swedish chemist and agricultural scientist
- Albert William Atwater (1856–1929), Canadian legislator from Quebec
- Albert Au (born 1955), Hong Kong-English singer-songwriter and DJ
- Albert Zenophile Aubin (1891–1957), Canadian political figure
- Albert Aublet (1851–1938), French painter
- Albert Auger (1889–1917), French flying ace pilot
- Albert Aurier (1865–1892), French poet, art critic, and painter
- Albert Austin (1882–1953), English actor, film star, director, and script writer
- Albert E. Austin (1877–1942), American surgeon and congressman from Connecticut
- Albert William Austin (1857–1934), Canadian golfer and businessman
- Albert Auwercx (c. 1629–1709), Belgian tapestry-maker
- Albert Avdolyan (born 1970), Russian-Armenian businessman
- Albert Avery (1883–1914), English rugby union and rugby league footballer
- Albert Edwin Avey (1886–1963), American philosopher and professor
- Albert Awachie (born 1992), Canadian football player
- Albert S. Axelrad (born 1938), American Reform rabbi, author, educator, and community leader
- Albert Axelrod (1921–2004), American foil fencer
- Albert Ayat (1875–1935), French fencer
- Albert Ayguesparse (1900–1996), Belgian writer
- Albert Ayler (1936–1970), American jazz saxophonist
- Albert Azaryan (1929–2023), Soviet-Armenian artistic gymnast
- Albert Ulrik Bååth (1853–1912), Swedish poet, translator, lecturer, and author
- Albert Bach (1910–2003), Austrian Nazi soldier
- Albert Bachmann (1863–1934), Swiss lexicographer and dialectologist
- Albert Bachmann (1906–?), Swiss gymnast
- Albert Bachmann (1929–2011), Swiss military intelligence officer
- Albert Baciocco (1931–2015), American U.S. Navy vice admiral
- Albert Victor Bäcklund (1845–1922), Swedish mathematician and physicist
- Albert Baernstein II (1941–2014), American mathematician
- Albert Baertsoen (1866–1922), Belgian painter, pastellist, and graphic artist
- Albert E. Baesel (1890–1918), American Army officer and Medal of Honor recipient
- Albert Baez (1912–2007), Mexican-American physicist
- Albert Edward Baharagate Akiiki (1930–2023), Ugandan Roman Catholic priest
- Albert George Baidoe Amoah, Ghanaian academic
- Albert Bailey, English rugby league footballer
- Albert William Bailey (1873–1955), American Christian missionary
- Albert Baillie (1864–1955), English clergyman
- Albert Baines, English priest, Archdeacon of Halifax (1935–1946)
- Albert Bakaev (1964–2009), Russian Paralympic swimmer
- Albert Baker (1872–1948), English cricketer
- Albert Baker d'Isy (1906x–1968), French cycling journalist and author
- Albert C. Baker (1845–1921), American jurist and politician
- Albert J. Baker (1874–1964), American politician, farmer, and businessman
- Albert William Baker (1918–2008), Canadian aviator and aeronautical engineer
- Albert Bakun (born 1946), Russian painter
- Albert V. Balch (1828–1915), American surveyor, businessman, and politician
- Albert Balchen (1874–1940), Norwegian barrister, economist, editor, and politician
- Albert Henrik Krohn Balchen (1825–1908), Norwegian priest and politician
- Albert Baldauf (1917–1991), German politician
- Albert Balink (1906–1976), Dutch journalist and filmmaker
- Albert Ball (1863–1946), English politician
- Albert Ball (1896–1917), British fighter pilot
- Albert Ballard (1888–1969), British politician
- Albert Ballin (1857–1918), German shipping magnate
- Albert Ballu (1849–1939), French architect
- Albert W. Bally (1925–2019), American geologist
- Albert Balows (1921–2006), American clinical microbiologist
- Albert Band (1924–2002), French-American film director and film producer
- Albert Bandura (1925–2021), Canadian-American psychologist
- Albert Banfield (1912–1970), English footballer
- Albert Baning (born 1985), Cameroonian footballer
- Albert Banks (1883–1930), Australian cricketer and Australian rules footballer
- Albert Franklin Banta (1843–1924), American newspaperman, politician, jurist, and army scout
- Albert Baldwin Bantock (1862–1938), British politician, Mayor of Wolverhampton (1905–1907, 1914–1915)
- Albert Barakeina (born 1948), Papua New Guinea lawn bowler
- Albert Wilfred Barbelle (1887–1957), American artist and illustrator
- Albert S. Bard (1866–1963), American lawyer and civic activist
- Albert Barillé (1920–2009), French television producer, creator, screenwriter, cartoonist, and animation studio owner
- Albert Barker (1901–1961), Australian rules footballer
- Albert S. Barker (1843–1916), American United States Navy admiral
- Albert Barnes (1798–1870), American theologian, clergyman, abolitionist, temperance advocate, and author
- Albert Barnes (1913–1990), Welsh Bantamweight boxer
- Albert C. Barnes (1872–1951), American chemist, businessman, art collector, writer, and educator
- Albert Barnett (1892–1941), English footballer
- Albert B. Barney (1835–1910), American lawyer, businessman, and legislator
- Albert W. Barney Jr. (1920–2010), American lawyer and judge
- Albert Baró (born 1996), Spanish actor
- Albert Désiré Barre (1818–1878), French engraver and medalist
- Albert Barrett (1903–1989), English footballer
- Albert Moore Barrett (1871–1936), American physician and professor
- Albert Barron (1888–1962), American football player, college track and football coach, and college athletics administrator
- Albert Bartha (1877–1960), Hungarian military officer and politician
- Albert Barthélémy (1906–1988), French racing cyclist
- Albert Barthelme (1919–2004), American basketball coach
- Albert O'Donnell Bartholeyns (1852–1922), English journalist, hospital administrator, and translator
- Albert Bartholomé (1848–1928), French painter and sculptor
- Albert Bartlett (1884–1969), English footballer
- Albert Bartlett (1900–1968), Australian cricketer
- Albert Allen Bartlett (1923–2013), American physicist and professor
- Albert Charles Bartlett (1900–1976), British electrical engineer
- Albert L. Bartlett (1851–1934), American congressman from Massachusetts
- Albert Baskakov (1928–2012), Soviet and Russian scientist
- Albert Henry Baskerville (1883–1908), New Zealand postal clerk, rugby union player, and author
- Albert Bassermann (1867–1952), German stage and screen actor
- Albert Batchellor (1850–1913), American lawyer, historian, and politician from New Hampshire
- Albert Bateman (1924–2020), English footballer
- Albert Bates (1867–1950), New Zealand cricketer
- Albert Bates (1893–1948), American bank robber and burglar
- Albert Bates (born 1947), American lawyer, author, and teacher
- Albert Carlos Bates (1865–1954), American librarian, bibliographer, genealogist, book collector, and historian
- Albert Edmund Bates (1862–1929), Australian architect
- Albert Batsa (born 1983), Togolese footballer
- Albert Battel (1891–1952), German Army lieutenant and lawyer
- Albert Batteux (1919–2003), French footballer and manager
- Albert Batyrgaziev (born 1998), Russian Featherweight boxer
- Albert Batyrov (born 1981), Belarusian wrestler
- Albert Batzill (born 1952), German sailor
- Albert Bauer (1928–2021), American senator from Washington
- Albert C. Baugh (1891–1981), American professor and author
- Albert Baumann, Swiss sport shooter
- Albert Baumeister (1882–1953), German trade unionist and journalist
- Albert David Baumhart Jr. (1908–2001), American congressman from Ohio
- Albert Baumler (1914–1973), American fighter ace piolet
- Albert Baur (1835–1906), German painter, illustrator, and engraver
- Albert Bayet (1880–1961), French sociologist and professor
- Albert Baynham (1875–1951), English footballer
- Albert Bazeyan (born 1956), Armenian politician, Mayor of Yerevan (1999–2001)
- Albert I. Beach (1883–1939), American politician, Mayor of Kansas City, Missouri (1924–1930)
- Albert Lee Beaty (1869–1936), American congressman from Ohio
- Albert Béchard (1922–2002), Canadian politician and notary from Quebec
- Albert Bechervaise (1884–1969), British politician
- Albert Bechestobill (1879–1959), American wrestler
- Albert Beckaert (1910–1980), Belgian racing cyclist
- Albert Becker (1834–1899), German composer and conductor
- Albert Becker (1896–1984), Austrian-Argentine chess master
- Albert L. Becker (1911–1992), American United States Navy naval officer
- Albert Sidney Beckham (1897–1964), American psychologist
- Albert Beckles (born 1930), British bodybuilder
- Albert Bedane (1893–1980), British Army personnel
- Albert Bedford (1932–2001), Australian cricketer
- Albert Bedouce (1869–1947), French politician
- Albert Beech (1912–1985), English footballer
- Albert Beerman (1901–1967), Dutch politician
- Albert Beger (born 1959), Turkish saxophonist, flutist, and lecturer
- Albert Béguin (1901–1957), Swiss academic and translator
- Albert R. Behnke (1903–1992), American physician
- Albert Beier (1900–1972), German footballer
- Albert Belan (1930–2011), American senator from Pennsylvania
- Albert Belay (born 1925), German community activist
- Albert Belin (died 1677), French writer
- Albert Beliveau (1887–1971), American judge
- Albert Bell (1898–1973), English footballer
- Albert Bell (born 1964), American football player
- Albert Bellamy (1870–1931), English trade unionist and politician
- Albert Belle (born 1966), American major league baseball player
- Albert Fitch Bellows (1829–1883), American painter
- Albert Béltran (born 1993), Spanish field hockey player
- Albert Belz (born 1973), New Zealand actor, writer, and lecturer
- Albert Benbrook (1887–1943), American football player
- Albert Bendall (1884–1967), Australian politician
- Albert Bender (1866–1941), German-American art collector
- Albert K. Bender (1921–2016), American ufologist and author
- Albert Benitz (1904–1979), German cinematographer
- Albert Benjamin (1909–2006), Scottish bridge player
- Albert Bennett (1910–1985), English cricketer
- Albert Bennett (1944–2016), English footballer
- Albert Arnold Bennett (1849–1909), American Baptist missionary and composer
- Albert Arnold Bennett (1888–1971), American mathematician
- Albert E. Bennett (1914–1971), American senator and lawyer from Illinois
- Albert F. Bennett, American zoologist, physiologist, evolutionary biologist, author, and academic
- Albert Benningk (1637–1695), German bellfounder and producer of baroque cannons
- Albert Benschop (1949–2018), Dutch sociologist
- Albert Bensimon (born 1948), Australian businessman
- Albert Bentley (born 1960), American football player
- Albert Berbatovci (born 1989), Norwegian footballer
- Albert Berdini of Sarteano (1385–1450), Franciscan friar and preacher
- Albert Berg (1864–1945), American football player, coach, teacher, and deaf advocate
- Albert Berg (1872–1950), American surgeon
- Albert Berger, American film producer
- Albert Bergesen, American sociologist and professor
- Albert Berghaus, American illustrator
- Albert Berkowitz (1910–2008), American lawyer and senator from New York
- Albert Bernard (1917–?), Belgian fencer
- Albert James Bernays (1823–1892), British chemist
- Albert Berry (1878–?), American stuntman
- Albert S. Berry (1836–1908), American congressman from Kentucky
- Albert Bers (1931–2021), Belgian football player and coach
- Albert Bertelin (1872–1951), French composer
- Albert Bertelsen (1921–2019), Danish painter and graphic artist
- Albert Berzeviczy (1853–1936), Hungarian politician, Minister of Religion and Education (1903–1905)
- Albert Bessis (1885–1972), Tunisian politician
- Albert Bessler (1905–1975), German film actor
- Albert Besson (1896–1965), French hygienist and physician
- Albert Bethel (1874–1935), English businessman and politician
- Albert Bettannier (1851–1932), French painter
- Albert Betts (1888–1924), British gymnast
- Albert Betz (1885–1968), German physicist and pioneer of wind turbine technology
- Albert J. Beveridge (1862–1927), American historian and senator from Indiana
- Albert Beyer (1859–1929), American United States Navy Coxswain and Medal of Honor recipient
- Albert Turner Bharucha-Reid (1927–1985), American mathematician and theorist
- Albert Bickford (1887–1971), Australian rules footballer
- Albert S. Bickmore (1839–1914), American naturalist and museum originator
- Albert M. Bielawski (1867–1942), Polish-American congressman from Michigan
- Albert Bielschowsky (1847–1902), German literary historian
- Albert Bierstadt (1830–1902), German-American painter
- Albert Bigelow (1906–1993), American United States Navy Commander
- Albert Biggs (1889–1954), Australian rules footballer
- Albert Bijaoui (born 1943), French astronomer
- Albert Bilicke (1861–1915), American hotelier and businessman
- Albert Bimper (born 1983), American football player
- Albert Birch (1868–1936), English cricketer
- Albert Bird (1867–1927), English cricketer
- Albert Webb Bishop (1832–1901), American lawyer, public official, university administrator, and Union Army soldier
- Albert Bitran (1931–2018), French painter, engraver, and sculptor
- Albert Bittlmayer (1952–1977), German footballer
- Albert Bittner (1900–1980), German conductor and music director
- Albert Black (born 1959), American businessman
- Albert T. Blackwell Jr. (1925–2022), American justice from Maryland
- Albert Blakeney (1850–1924), American congressman from Maryland
- Albert Francis Blakeslee (1874–1954), American botanist
- Albert P. Blakeslee, American congressman from Wisconsin
- Albert Blakey (1879–1935), Australian politician
- Albert Blan (1930–2015), English rugby league footballer
- Albert G. Blanchard (1810–1891), American United States Army general
- Albert H. Blanding (1876–1970), American United States Army officer
- Albert Blankert (1940–2022), Dutch art historian
- Albert Blattmann (1904–1967), Swiss cyclist
- Albert Blaustein (1921–1994), American civil rights and human rights lawyer and constitutional consultant
- Albert Taylor Bledsoe (1809–1877), American Episcopal priest, attorney, mathematician, professor, and Confederate Army officer
- Albert A. Bliss (1812–1893), American congressman from Ohio
- Albert Blithe (1923–1967), American U.S. Army Master Sergeant
- Albert Bloch (1882–1961), American artist
- Albert Blount (1889–1961), English cricketer
- Albert Bloxham (1905–1996), English footballer
- Albert Blue (1881–1967), Canadian congressman from Alberta
- Albert Blumberg (1906–1997), American philosopher and political activist
- Albert H. Blumenthal (1928–1984), American lawyer and politician
- Albert Boadella (born 1943), Spanish actor and playwright
- Albert Adu Boahen (1932–2006), Ghanaian academic, historian, and politician
- Albert Boardman (1870–1943), English football goalkeeper
- Albert Ebossé Bodjongo (1989–2014), Cameroonian footballer
- Albert E. Bodwell (1851–1926), American architect and designer
- Albert Boer (1935–2002), Dutch author
- Albert Bogatyryov (born 1994), Russian footballer
- Albert Bogen (Albert Bógathy; 1882–1961), Austrian fencer
- Albert Vilhelm Bøgh (1843–1927), Norwegian actor
- Albert Bogle (born 1949), Scottish minister of the Church of Scotland
- Albert Boime (1933–2008), American art historian and author
- Albert Bollinger (1870–1933), American businessman, lawyer, and senator from Illinois
- Albert Bollmann (1889–1959), German footballer
- Albert Bonass (1911–1945), English footballer
- Albert Boni (1892–1981), American book publisher and co-founder of the publishing company Boni & Liveright
- Albert Bonnier (1820–1900), Swedish book publisher and entrepreneur
- Albert Bontridder (1921–2015), Belgian architect and writer
- Albert Bonzano (1905–1985), French rower
- Albert Boonstra (born 1957), Dutch swimmer
- Albert Booth (1928–2010), British politician and cabinet minister
- Albert A. Booth (1850–1914), American pioneer, settler, and county official
- Albert Bore (born 1946), British nuclear physicist, academic, and politician
- Albert Borella (1881–1968), Australian Imperial Force Captain and Victoria Cross recipient
- Albert Borg Olivier de Puget (1932–2017), Maltese diplomat
- Albert Borgard (1659–1751), Danish artillery and engineer officer
- Albert Borgmann (1937–2023), German-American philosopher
- Albert Borland (1901–1961), South African cricketer
- Albert Bormann (1902–1989), German Socialist Motor Corps officer
- Albert Borschette (1920–1976), Luxembourgish diplomat and writer
- Albert Borsig (1829–1878), German entrepreneur
- Albert Borzenkov (born 1973), Russian footballer and coach
- Albert Bosanquet (1837–1923), British judge
- Albert H. Bosch (1908–2005), American jurist and congressman from New York
- Albert O. Boschen (1873–1957), American politician
- Albert Boscov (1929–2017), American businessman and philanthropist
- Albert Bosomtwi-Sam (1954–1998), Ghanaian lawyer and politician
- Albert Bosquet (1882–1926), Belgian sport shooter
- Albert D. Bosson (1853–1926), American jurist, attorney, and politician, Mayor of Chelsea, Massachusetts (1891)
- Albert Carlton Bostwick (1878–1911), American banker, sportsman, and car enthusiast
- Albert C. Bostwick Jr. (1901–1980), American jockey, Thoroughbred racehorse owner, breeder, and trainer
- Albert Botran (born 1984), Spanish historian and congressman
- Albert Bouchard (born 1947), American musician and founding member of the American rock band Blue Öyster Cult
- Albert Bourcier (1879–1971), French equestrian
- Albert Bourcier (1901–1982), Canadian congressman from Alberta
- Albert Bourderon (1858–1930), French barrel maker and syndicalist
- Albert Bourget (1881–1956), French sculptor
- Albert Bourla (born 1961), Greek-American veterinarian and CEO of Pfizer
- Albert Bourlon (1916–2013), French road bicycle racer
- Albert Bourne (1863–1930), English footballer
- Albert Bousser (1906–1995), Luxembourgish politician, railway inspector, and trade unionist
- Albert Boutinet (1901–1963), French racing cyclist
- Albert Boutwell (1904–1978), American senator, Mayor of Birmingham, Alabama (1963–1967), and Lieutenant Governor of Alabama (1959–1963)
- Albert Bouvet (1930–2017), French cyclist
- Albert Bouwers (1893–1972), Dutch optical engineer
- Albert Bowden (1874–1943), Australian cricketer
- Albert E. Bowen (1875–1953), American lawyer and Mormon religious leader
- Albert Bowen, 1st Baronet (1858–1924), English businessman
- Albert Bowers, English rugby league footballer
- Albert H. Bowker (1919–2008), American statistician and university administrator
- Albert Jesse Bowley Sr. (1875–1945), American United States Army lieutenant general
- Albert A. Boyajian (born 1940), American businessman and Armenian activist
- Albert Boyd (1906–1976), American United States Air Force test pilot and Major General
- Albert Brachet (1869–1930), Belgian physician and professor
- Albert J. Brackley (1874–1937), American congressman from New York
- Albert Brackmann (1871–1952), German historian and writer
- Albert Bradshaw (1882–1956), Canadian politician, businessman, and farmer
- Albert Andriessen Bradt (1607–1686), Norwegian settler
- Albert Bragg (1896–1970), Australian rules footballer
- Albert Brahms (1692–1758), Frisian dike judge and community leader
- Albert Braithwaite (1893–1959), British politician
- Albert Brallisford (1911–1991), English footballer
- Albert R. Brand (1889–1940), American author and zoologist
- Albert Brandon-Cremer (1871–1959), Australian theatre manager, producer, and stage actor
- Albert Brasseur (1860–1932), stage name for the French actor, Jules Cyrille Albert Dumont
- Albert Brassey (1844–1918), British rower, soldier, and politician
- Albert Braun (1889–1983), American Roman Catholic priest and teacher
- Albert Breer (born 1980), American football journalist
- Albert Bregman (1936–2023), Canadian academic and phycologist
- Albert Brehme (1903–1971), German bobsledder
- Albert Heinrich Brendel (1827–1895), German painter
- Albert Brenner (1926–2022), American production designer and art director
- Albert Breton (1882–1954), French clergyman and bishop
- Albert Brewer (1928–2017), American lawyer and congressman from Alabama, Governor of Alabama (1968–1971)
- Albert Briand (1909–1966), French merchant and politician
- Albert Brigance (died 2007), American author and special education resource specialist
- Albert Perry Brigham (1855–1932), American geologist
- Albert George Brighton (1900–1988), British museum curator and paleontologist
- Albert Brisbane (1809–1890), American utopian socialist and author
- Albert Broadbent (1867–1912), English food lecturer, writer, and vegetarianism activist
- Albert Broadbent (1934–2006), English footballer
- Albert Broadhouse (1893–1946), English footballer
- Albert R. Broccoli (1909–1996), American film producer
- Albert Brock-Utne (1906–c. 1990), Norwegian religious scholar and anthropologist
- Albert Brojka (born 1958), Albanian politician, Mayor of Tirana (1996–2000)
- Albert Nelson Bromley (1850–1934), English architect
- Albert Brommels (1891–1962), Finnish schoolteacher, journalist, and politician
- Albert Brooks (born 1947), American actor, comedian, writer, and director
- Albert Broome (1900–1989), English footballer
- Albert Broomham (1885–1948), Australian rugby league footballer
- Albert Brough (1895–1980), English rugby league and association footballer
- Albert Brown (1862–1930), English footballer
- Albert Brown (1879–1955), English footballer
- Albert Brown (1890–1954), Australian cricketer
- Albert Brown (1905–2011), American dentist and U.S. Army officer
- Albert Brown (1911–1995), English cricketer and snooker player
- Albert Brown (born 1963), Canadian football player
- Albert A. Brown (1895–1971), Canadian politician, barrister, lawyer, and Canadian football player
- Albert E. Brown (1889–1984), American U.S. Army Major General
- Albert G. Brown (1813–1880), American senator from Mississippi, Governor of Mississippi (1844–1848)
- Albert Grant Brown (1881–1924), American architect and professor
- Albert Greenwood Brown (born 1954), American murderer and rapist
- Albert Joseph Brown (1861–1938), Canadian lawyer and politician from Quebec
- Albert Joseph Brown III (born 1968), American singer, songwriter, record producer, radio host, and record executive known professionally as Al B. Sure!
- Albert O. Brown (1852–1937), American lawyer, banker, and politician from New Hampshire, Governor of New Hampshire (1921–1923)
- Albert Oldfield Brown (1872–1945), American actor
- Albert Bruce (born 1993), Ghanaian footballer
- Albert Bruce-Joy (1842–1924), Irish sculptor
- Albert Bruckner (1904–1985), Swiss historian, paleographer, and medievalist
- Albert Brudzewski (c. 1445–c. 1497), Polish astronomer, mathematician, philosopher, and diplomat
- Albert Brülls (1937–2004), German footballer
- Albert E. Brumley (1905–1977), American composer and publisher
- Albert Brunies (1900–1978), American jazz cornetist
- Albert Brunner (1918–1943), German Luftwaffe ace and Knight's Cross of the Iron Cross recipient
- Albert Bruntnell (1866–1929), Australian politician
- Albert Bryan (born 1968), Virgin Islander politician, Governor of the United States Virgin Islands (2019–present)
- Albert Vickers Bryan (1899–1984), American judge
- Albert Vickers Bryan Jr. (1926–2019), American judge
- Albert Bryant Jr. (born 1952), American U.S. Army brigadier general
- Albert Büche (1911–?), Swiss footballer
- Albert Büchi (1907–1988), Swiss road bicycle racer
- Albert Buchman (1859–1936), American architect
- Albert Buchmann (1894–1975), German politician
- Albert Buck (1895–1942), German Nazi general
- Albert Buckley (1877–1965), British politician and businessman
- Albert Budak (born 1985), French footballer
- Albert R. Buehman (1886–1967), American photographer and congressman from Arizona
- Albert A. Bühlmann (1923–1994), Swiss physician
- Albert Buick (1875–1948), Scottish footballer
- Albert Frederik Hendrik Buining (1901–1976), Dutch botanist
- Albert Bullock (1884–1951), English footballer
- Albert Bumford, Welsh footballer
- Albert H. Bumstead (1875–1940), American cartographer and inventor
- Albert Bunjaki (born 1971), Kosovan footballer, coach, and manager
- Albert Bunjaku (born 1983), Kosovan footballer
- Albert Burbank (1902–1976), American clarinetist
- Albert Burditt (born 1972), American basketball player
- Albert Burdon (1900–1981), British actor and comedian
- Albert Burdus (1885–1961), Australian rugby league footballer
- Albert Burge (1889–1943), Australian rugby union player
- Albert Bürger (1913–1996), German fire official
- Albert Burger (1925–1981), German politician
- Albert Burger (1955–2023), German alpine skier
- Albert Franklin Burgess (1873–1953), American entomologist
- Albert Burgh (1593–1647), Dutch physician and Mayor of Amsterdam
- Albert Burke (1901–1958), French tennis player
- Albert E. Burke (1919–1999), American professor, environmentalist, radio and television personality, public speaker and author
- Albert Burkill (1839–1913), British businessman
- Albert S. Burleson (1863–1937), American congressman from Texas and Postmaster General from 1913 to 1921
- Albert E. Burling (1891–1960), American Supreme Court justice from New Jersey
- Albert Burnett (born 1955), Scottish footballer
- Albert Burns (1898–1921), American dirt and board track motorcycle racer
- Albert Garrette Burns (1888–1951), American inventor
- Albert M. Burns (1847–1903), American U.S. Army soldier and senator from Indiana
- Albert G. Burr (1829–1882), American congressman from Illinois
- Albert Burrage (1859–1931), American industrialist, attorney, horticulturist, and philanthropist
- Albert Burrows (1837–1896), American congressman from Washington
- Albert Burstein (1922–2018), American politician from New Jersey
- Albert Burtch (1804–1888), American farmer, pioneer, and congressman from Wisconsin
- Albert Burton (1838–?), American U.S. Navy sailor and Medal of Honor recipient
- Albert Buser, Swiss footballer
- Albert Bush-Brown (1926–1994), American architectural historian and university president
- Albert Bussau (1884–1947), British politician and Agent General
- Albert Bustamante (1935–2021), American congressman from Texas
- Albert Busuttil (1891–1956), Maltese philosopher
- Albert Butler (1872–1952), English architect known professionally as A. T. Butler
- Albert Butler (born 1947/1948), American senator from Mississippi
- Albert Jamil Butros (1934–2021), Jordanian Ambassador and university dean
- Albert Butterworth (1912–1991), English footballer
- Albert Butz (1849–1905), Swiss-American inventor and businessman
- Albert Byrd (1915–1990), American cyclist
- Albert Caasmann (1886–1968), German sculptor and porcelain artist
- Albert Cabestany (born 1980), Spanish motorcycle trials rider
- Albert Cadot (1901–1972), French sailor
- Albert Cadwell (1900–1944), English footballer
- Albert Cahen (1846–1903), French composer
- Albert Cahen (1877–1837), French fencer
- Albert Edmunds Cahlan (1899–1968), American newspaper publisher and civil leader
- Albert Callan (1839–1912), Irish businessman and politician
- Albert Calland (1929–2014), English footballer
- Albert M. Calland III (1952–2023), American United States Navy vice admiral
- Albert Callay (1822–1896), French pharmacist and botanist
- Albert Calmes (1881–1967), Luxembourgish economist and historian
- Albert Calmette (1863–1933), French physician, bacteriologist, and immunologist
- Albert Frederick Calvert (1872–1946), English author, engineer, and explorer
- Albert Cambriels (1816–1891), French military commander
- Albert Cameron, American architect
- Albert Cammermeyer (1838–1893), Norwegian bookseller and publisher
- Albert Campbell (1872–1947), American singer
- Albert Campbell (1894–1961), Canadian musher and trapper
- Albert Campbell (1910–1973), Canadian politician, Mayor of Scarborough, Ontario (1967–1969), and Chairman of Metropolitan Toronto (1969–1973)
- Albert Campbell (born 1938), Northern Irish footballer
- Albert J. Campbell (1857–1907), American congressman from Montana
- Albert Ralph Campbell (1875–1925), American United States Marine Corps Corporal and Medal of Honor recipient
- Albert Camus (1913–1960), Algerian philosopher, author, dramatist, and journalist
- Albert Canal (born 1991), Spanish footballer
- Albert Canet (1878–1930), French tennis player
- Albert Cano Smit (born 1996), Spanish-Dutch pianist
- Albert F. Canwell (1907–2002), American journalist and congressman from Washington
- Albert Capellani (1874–1931), French film director and screenwriter
- Albert Capellas (born 1967), Spanish football manager
- Albert Capraro (1943–2013), American fashion designer
- Albert Caquot (1881–1976), French engineer
- Albert Caraco (1919–1971), French-Uruguayan philosopher, writer, essayist, and poet
- Albert Cardozo (1828–1885), American jurist and attorney
- Albert N. Carlblom (1865–1920), American public servant and State Auditor from North Dakota
- Albert E. Carlton (1866–1931), American investor and businessman
- Albert Carman (1833–1917), Canadian Methodist minister and teacher
- Albert A. Carmichael (1895–1952), American politician, Lieutenant Governor of Alabama from 1939 to 1943
- Albert Carnelly (1870–1920), English footballer
- Albert Carnesale (born 1936), American academic and arms specialist
- Albert J. Carpenter (1911–1999), American United States Coast Guard officer
- Albert Carré (1852–1938), French theatre director, opera director, actor, and librettist
- Albert Carrier (1919–2002), Italian-American actor
- Albert Carrington (1813–1889), American apostle
- Albert Carter (1898–?), English footballer
- Albert Desbrisay Carter (1892–1919), Canadian Royal Flying Corps flying ace
- Albert E. Carter (1881–1964), American lawyer and congressman from California
- Albert Cartier (born 1960), French footballer and manager
- Albert F. Case Jr. (born 1955), American software engineer
- Albert Vincent Casey (1920–2004), American United States Postmaster General
- Albert Cashier (1843–1915), American Union Army soldier
- Albert Cassell (1895–1969), American architect
- Albert E. Castel (1928–2014), American historian and author
- Albert Castelyns (1917–1974), Belgian water polo player
- Albert Castiglia (born 1969), American blues singer, songwriter, and guitarist
- Albert Casuga (born 1943), Filipino-Canadian writer
- Albert Edward Caswell (1884–1954), Canadian physician and professor
- Albert L. Catlin (c. 1809–1884), American politician, Mayor of Burlington, Vermont from 1865 to 1866
- Albert Cavens (1906–1985), Belgian-American silent film actor
- Albert Celades (born 1975), Spanish footballer and manager
- Albert Černý (born 1989), Czech singer and guitarist
- Albert Chabrier (1896–1920), French flying ace
- Albert Chadwick (1866–1937), English footballer
- Albert Chadwick (1897–1983), Australian rules footballer
- Albert Charles Challen (1847–1881), British artist
- Albert John Chalmers (1870–1920), British colonial physician and researcher
- Albert Chama, Zambian Anglican bishop
- Albert Chamberland (1886–1975), Canadian violinist, composer, conductor, music producer, and music educator
- Albert A. Chambers (1906–1993), American bishop, Bishop of the Episcopal Diocese of Springfield from 1962 to 1972
- Albert Champagne (1866–1937), Canadian rancher, hotel owner, and politician from Saskatchewan
- Albert Champion (1851–1909), English cricketer
- Albert Champion (1878–1927), French track bicycle racer and industrialist
- Albert Champoudry (1880–1933), French middle-distance runner
- Albert Chan (born 1955), Hong Kong politician
- Albert M. Chan (born 1975), Canadian-American actor and filmmaker
- Albert Sun-Chi Chan (born 1950), Hong Kong chemist
- Albert M. Chang, American physicist
- Albert Bishop Chance (1873–1949), American businessman and inventor
- Albert Brown Chandler (1840–1923), American businessman
- Albert Chang (born 1971), Canadian tennis player
- Albert Chapman (1872–1945), Australian politician
- Albert Charlesworth (1865–1926), English cricketer
- Albert Charpin (1842–1924), French painter
- Albert Chartier (1912–2004), French-Canadian cartoonist and illustrator
- Albert Chartier, French racing cyclist
- Albert Chaumarat (1925–2013), French racing cyclist
- Albert Chavannes (1836–1903), Swiss-American author, philosopher, and sociologist
- Albert Cheesebrough (1935–2020), English footballer
- Albert Cheetham (1915–1997), Australian cricketer
- Albert Chemutai (born 1999), Ugandan runner
- Albert Chen Hung-yee (born 1957), Hong Kong legal scholar
- Albert Cheng (born 1946), Hong Kong-Canadian radio host, businessman, and politician
- Albert Cheng (born 1970), American politician
- Albert Chernenko (1935–2009), Russian philosopher
- Albert Chester (1886–1962), English footballer
- Albert Huntington Chester (1843–1903), American geologist and mining engineer
- Albert Chevalier (1861–1923), English music hall comedian, singer, and theatre actor
- Albert Chiarandini (1915–2007), Italian-Canadian painter
- Albert Chibnall (1894–1988), British biochemist
- Albert Chichery (1888–1944), French politician
- Albert Childs (born 1930), English footballer
- Albert Chimedza (born 1955), Zimbabwean poet
- Albert Chmielowski (1845–1916), Polish nobleman and painter
- Albert Chong (born 1958), Jamaican artist
- Albert M. Chop (1916–2006), American newspaper reporter and aerospace public relations officer
- Albert Chowne (1920–1945), Australian Army soldier and Victoria Cross recipient
- Albert Sherman Christensen (1905–1996), American trial attorney, author, and United States district judge from Utah
- Albert Chua (born 1968), Singaporean civil servant and diplomat
- Albert T. Church (born 1947), American United States Navy vice admiral
- Albert Ciamberlani (1864–1956), Belgian symbolist painter
- Albert Cigagna (born 1960), French rugby union footballer
- Albert Cim (1845–1924), French novelist, literary critic, and bibliographer
- Albert Clapp (1867–1936), English cricketer
- Albert A. Clapp (1841–1911), American U.S. Army soldier and Medal of Honor recipient
- Albert Clark (1843–1928), English painter
- Albert Clark (1910–1988), American major league baseball player
- Albert Curtis Clark (1859–1937), English classical scholar
- Albert M. Clark (1879–1950), American Supreme Court justice from Missouri
- Albert O. Clark (1858–1935), American architect
- Albert P. Clark (1913–2010), American United States Air Force Academy superintendent
- Albert Clarke (1916–1944), English footballer
- Albert Claude (1899–1983), Belgian-American cell biologist and medical doctor
- Albert Clauson (1870–1946), British barrister and judge
- Albert T. Clay (1866–1925), American professor, historian, and Semitic linguist
- Albert Cleage (1911–2000), American Christian minister, politician, newspaper publisher, political organizer, and author
- Albert Cleary (1919–1945), Australian soldier
- Albert Clemenceau (1861–1955), French lawyer and politician
- Albert Clément (1883–1907), French racing driver
- Albert Clement (born 1962), Dutch musicologist and professor
- Albert Clerc (1830–1918), French chess master
- Albert Cleuter (1901–1996), Belgian botanical artist
- Albert Clough (1901–1957), English footballer
- Albert Edward Cloutier (1902–1965), Canadian painter and graphic designer
- Albert Cluytens (born 1955), Belgian footballer
- Albert Coates (1882–1953), English conductor and composer
- Albert Coates (1895–1977), Australian surgeon and soldier
- Albert Coates (1896–1989), American lawyer
- Albert Cobo (1893–1957), American politician, Mayor of Detroit, Michigan (1950–1957)
- Albert Cocksedge (1884–1928), British bantamweight and flyweight boxer
- Albert Wheeler Coffrin (1919–1993), American United States district judge from Vermont
- Albert Cohen (1895–1981), Greek-Swiss novelist
- Albert Cohen (1932–2025), Israeli actor, voice actor, theatre director, singer, and accordionist
- Albert Cohen (born 1965), French mathematician
- Albert Cohen, French film and television producer, musical producer, and radio personality
- Albert D. Cohen (1914–2011), Canadian entrepreneur, community builder, philanthropist, and Officer of the Order of Canada
- Albert K. Cohen (1918–2014), American criminologist
- Albert Cohn (1814–1877), French philanthropist and scholar
- Albert C. Cohn (1885–1959), American judge from New York
- Albert Colbec (1884–1966), French racing cyclist
- Albert T. Colburn (1816–unknown), American congressman from Wisconsin
- Albert Cole (1904–1966), American senator from Massachusetts, Mayor of Lynn, Massachusetts (1946–1947)
- Albert Cole (born 1981), Sierra Leonean footballer
- Albert M. Cole (1901–1994), American congressman from Kansas
- Albert Coleman, English footballer
- Albert L. Coles (1909–1978), American senator and Attorney General from Connecticut
- Albert Collett (1842–1896), Norwegian businessman, timber merchant, and sawmill owner
- Albert Collier (1909–1988), Australian rules footballer
- Albert Henry Collings (1868–1947), English artist
- Albert Collins (1868–1956), Australian politician
- Albert Collins (1883–1951), Australian painter, teacher, and actor
- Albert Collins (1899–1969), English footballer
- Albert Collins (1932–1993), American electric blues guitarist and singer
- Albert Collon, Belgian ice hockey player
- Albert C. Comstock (1845–1910), American lawyer and senator from New York
- Albert Conlon (1880–1956), Australian rugby league footballer
- Albert Connell (born 1974), American football player
- Albert Clinton Conner (1848–1929), American Impressionist painter
- Albert O. Connor (1914–1989), American United States Army lieutenant general
- Albert J. Connors (1891–1948), American senator from Wisconsin
- Albert Conrad De Vito (1904–1970), Italian Roman Catholic clergyman
- Albert Constable (1805–1855), American lawyer and congressman from Maryland
- Albert Conti (1887–1967), Italian-American actor
- Albert Contreras (1933–2017), American artist and painter
- Albert Conway (1889–1969), American politician and lawyer from New York, Chief Judge of the New York Court of Appeals (1955–1959)
- Albert Cook (1880–1949), English footballer
- Albert John Cook (1842–1916), American entomologist and zoologist
- Albert Ruskin Cook (1870–1951), British medical missionary
- Albert Spaulding Cook (1925–1998), American literary critic, poet, classical scholar, teacher, and translator
- Albert Stanburrough Cook (1853–1927), American philologist, literary critic, and scholar
- Albert Cooke (1908–1988), English footballer
- Albert D. Cooley (1900–1976), American United States Marine Corps. lieutenant general and aviator
- Albert Coons (1912–1978), American physician, pathologist, and immunologist
- Albert Cooper (1893–1977), English cricketer
- Albert Cooper (1904–1993), American soccer goalkeeper and politician
- Albert Cooper (1910–1986), British politician
- Albert Cooper (1924–2011), British flute maker
- Albert Cooper (born 1952), Canadian politician
- Albert Cope (c. 1878–1930), English billiards and snooker player
- Albert James Smith Copp (1866–1912), Canadian politician
- Albert Coppé (1911–1999), Belgian politician and economist
- Albert H. C. Corbett (1887–1983), Canadian legislator from Manitoba
- Albert T. Corbett, American research professor and psychologist
- Albert Cordingley (1871–1945), English cricketer
- Albert Corey (1878–1926), French marathon runner
- Albert Cornelis (c. 1485–1532), Flemish Renaissance painter
- Albert J. Cornish (1856–1920), American congressman and Supreme Court justice from Nebraska
- Albert Cossery (1913–2008), Egyptian-French writer
- Albert Costa (born 1975), Spanish tennis player
- Albert Costa (born 1990), Spanish racing driver
- Albert Costain (1910–1987), British politician
- Albert Côté (1927–2020), Canadian forestry engineer and politician
- Albert Courquin (1875–1953), French sport shooter
- Albert Courtot (1891–1955), French racing cyclist
- Albert B. Cowden (1879–1958), American college football and basketball coach
- Albert E. Cowdrey (1933–2022), American author
- Albert Cox (1917–2003), English footballer
- Albert Lyman Cox (1883–1965), American attorney, legislator, judge, and U.S. Army major general
- Albert Coyette (1860–1935), French philatelist
- Albert Crahay (1903–1991), Belgian historian and soldier
- Albert Craig (1849–1909), English rhymester
- Albert Craig (born 1962), Scottish footballer
- Albert Craig, Jamaican reggae musician, member of the Jamaican vocal trio, Israel Vibration
- Albert M. Craig (1927–2021), American academic, historian, author, and professor
- Albert Cramond (1881–1954), New Zealand cricketer
- Albert M. Crampton (1900–1953), American jurist
- Albert P. Crary (1911–1987), American pioneer geophysicist and glaciologist
- Albert W. Cretella (1897–1979), American congressman from Connecticut
- Albert Crewe (1927–2009), British-American physicist and inventor
- Albert H. Crews (born 1929), American chemical and aeronautical engineer and United States Air Force astronaut
- Albert Cristina (born 1970), Dutch volleyball player
- Albert Crocker (1882–1961), American inventor and businessman, founder of Crocker Motorcycles
- Albert Scott Crossfield (1921–2006), American naval officer and test pilot
- Albert Crumeyrolle (1919–1992), French mathematician and professor
- Albert Crusat (born 1982), Spanish footballer
- Albert Cuffe (1895–1969), Canadian Air Force officer
- Albert Cullum (1921–2003), American teacher, educator, and writer
- Albert Culton, American basketball player
- Albert Cummings, American blues musician
- Albert B. Cummins (1850–1926), American lawyer and senator, Governor of Iowa (1902–1908)
- Albert Cunningham (died 1691), Irish British Army Colonel
- Albert Cuny (1869–1947), French linguist
- Albert Curtis (1875–1933), Australian tennis player and medical practitioner
- Albert Edward Curtis (1866–1940), English British Army Sergeant and Victoria Cross recipient
- Albert Curtz (1600–1671), German astronomer
- Albert Curwood (1910–1971), English footballer
- Albert Cuthbertson (1909–1977), New Zealand yachtsman
- Albert S. D'Agostino (1892–1970), American art director
- Albert Joseph Goblet d'Alviella (1790–1873), Belgian Army officer, politician, and Prime Minister of Belgium (1832–1834)
- Albert D'Oench (1852–1918), American architect
- Albert D'Souza (born 1945), Indian Roman Catholic Archbishop
- Albert Dadon (born 1957), Australian businessman, philanthropist, and musician
- Albert Daeger (1872–1932), American prelate
- Albert Dagnaux (1861–1933), French painter
- Albert Gustaf Dahlman (1848–1920), Swedish executioner
- Albert Dailey (1939–1984), American jazz pianist
- Albert Dakin (1873–1964), New Zealand cricketer
- Albert Dalimier (1875–1936), French politician
- Albert Dalmau (born 1992), Spanish footballer
- Albert Clayton Dalton (1867–1957), American U.S. Army officer
- Albert Daly (1900–1976), Australian rules footballer
- Albert Darasz (1808–1852), Polish political activist
- Albert Darcq (1848–1895), French sculptor
- Albert Dastre (1844–1917), French physiologist
- Albert Dauchez, French archer
- Albert Dauphin (1827–1898), French lawyer and politician
- Albert Dauzat (1877–1955), French linguist
- Albert David (1867–1950), Anglican bishop and schoolmaster
- Albert David (1896–1970), French sculptor
- Albert David (1902–1945), American United States Navy officer and recipient of the Navy Cross and Medal of Honor
- Albert Davies (1900–1953), British politician
- Albert Emil Davies (1875–1950), British politician and writer
- Albert Thomas Davies (1869–1940), Welsh footballer
- Albert Davis, American major league baseball pitcher
- Albert Davy (1886–1959), New Zealand political organizer and campaign manager
- Albert Dawes (1907–1973), English footballer
- Albert F. Dawson (1872–1949), American congressman from Iowa
- Albert K. Dawson (1885–1967), American photojournalist and film correspondent
- Albert Day (1797–1876), American politician, Lieutenant Governor of Connecticut (1856–1957)
- Albert Day (1865–1908), English cricketer
- Albert Day (1918–1983), English footballer
- Albert Day, Welsh footballer
- Albert Day, British iron and brass founder
- Albert R. Day (1861–unknown), American educator and senator from Maine
- Albert Dayer (1925–1987), Belgian decathlon athlete
- Albert L. De Alwis Seneviratne, Ceylonese politician
- Albert De Bunné (1896–?), Belgian cyclist
- Albert Gauthier de Clagny (1853–1927), French politician
- Albert De Coninck (1915–2006), Belgian communist Army soldier
- Albert De Deken (1915–2003), Belgian footballer
- Albert Patin de La Fizelière (1819–1879), French writer, art critic, and historian
- Albert Lecoy de La Marche (1839–1897), French archivist and historian
- Albert Terrien de Lacouperie (1844–1894), French orientalist, philologist, and author
- Albert De Martin (born 1951), Canadian politician from Quebec
- Albert De Paoli (born 1932), Australian footballer
- Albert De Raedt (1918–1992), Belgian footballer
- Albert Jean Michel de Rocca (1788–1818), French Army lieutenant
- Albert De Roocker (1904–1989), Belgian fencer
- Albert Gregorio De Souza (born 1933), Ghanaian politician
- Albert De Vleeschauwer (1897–1971), Belgian politician
- Albert De Wilton (1862–1931), British police general
- Albert Deagan (1902–1968), Australian rules footballer
- Albert Deborgies (1902–1984), French water polo player
- Albert Decaris (1901–1988), French artist, engraver, and painter
- Albert Decourtray (1923–1994), French Catholic Cardinal and Archbishop
- Albert Decrais (1838–1915), French lawyer, administrator, diplomat, and politician
- Albert Defant (1884–1974), Austrian meteorologist, oceanographer, and climatologist
- Albert Degnan, Scottish footballer
- Albert Dehert (1921–2013), Belgian footballer
- Albert Dejonghe (1894–1981), Belgian road bicycle racer
- Albert Dekker (1905–1968), American actor and congressman from California
- Albert Delannoy (1881–1944), French long jumper
- Albert Delin (1712–1771), Belgian harpsichord maker
- Albert Delpy (born 1941), French actor and writer
- Albert Delvaux (1918–1985), Congolese politician
- Albert Demangeon (1872–1940), French educator, author, and geographer
- Albert Joe Demby (1934–2021), Sierra Leonean politician
- Albert Demchenko (born 1971), Russian luger
- Albert Dement (1868–?), American horse breeder
- Albert DeMond (1901–1973), American screenwriter
- Albert Demuyser (1920–2003), Belgian artist
- Albert Denison (1805–1860), British politician and diplomat
- Albert Denison (1835–1903), British Royal Navy officer
- Albert Denny (1886–1965), British cyclist
- Albert H. Densmore (born 1946), American businessman and congressman from Oregon
- Albert Tatum Dent (1863–unknown), American lawyer and politician from Mississippi
- Albert W. Dent (1904–1984), American academic administrator and businessman
- Albert Thomas DeRome (1885–1959), American painter
- Albert Derrick (1862–1931), Australian philatelist
- Albert Derrick (1908–1975), Welsh footballer
- Albert Derrick (1939–2022), Welsh footballer
- Albert DeSalvo (1931–1973), American serial killer
- Albert Desenfans (1845–1938), Belgian sculptor
- Albert DeSilver (1888–1924), American lawyer and founding member of the American Civil Liberties Union
- Albert Flynn DeSilver (born 1968), American poet, memoirist, novelist, meditation teacher, speaker, and workshop leader
- Albert Dess (born 1947), German politician
- Albert Louis Deullin (1890–1923), French flying ace
- Albert Deuring (born 1962), Austrian sports shooter
- Albert Deutsch (1905–1961), American journalist and social historian
- Albert Devèze (1881–1959), Belgian politician and minister
- Albert George Dew-Smith (1848–1903), British physiologist, lens maker, bibliophile, and photographer
- Albert Dewes (1860–1892), New Zealand cricketer
- Albert Diaz (born 1960), American circuit judge
- Albert Dick (1856–1934), American businessman
- Albert Dickin (1901–1955), British freestyle swimmer and diver
- Albert Diebold (1895–1955), French rower
- Albert Christoph Dies (1755–1822), German painter, engraver, and biographer
- Albert Dietrich (1829–1908), German composer and conductor
- Albert Dietrich (1873–1961), German pathologist
- Albert Gottfried Dietrich (1795–1856), German botanist
- Albert Dieudonné (1889–1976), French actor, screenwriter, film director, and novelist
- Albert Dikwa (born 1998), Cameroonian footballer
- Albert Dimes (1914–1972), Scottish-Italian criminal and enforcer
- Albert Dinan (1902–1976), French film actor
- Albert V. DiVirgilio (born c. 1942), American politician, Mayor of Lynn, Massachusetts from 1986 to 1991
- Albert Divo (1895–1966), French racing driver
- Albert Baldwin Dod (1805–1845), American theologian and mathematician
- Albert Döderlein (1860–1941), German obstetrician and gynecologist
- Albert Doguzov (born 1968), Russian footballer and coach
- Albert Dohmen (born 1956), German operatic bass-baritone
- Albert Doja, Albanian-French professor and anthropologist
- Albert H. Dolan (1892–1951), American Catholic priest and author
- Albert Dolhats (1921–2009), French racing cyclist
- Albert Dolleschall (1887–1939), Austrian equestrian
- Albert Dolmans (1928–2021), American painter
- Albert Dolphin (1896–1940), British hospital porter and George Cross recipient
- Albert Don-Chebe, Ghanaian lawyer, soldier, and public servant
- Albert Edward Donovan (1859–1925), Canadian businessman and political figure
- Albert J. Dooley (1930–2022), American congressman from South Carolina
- Albert Dorca (born 1982), Spanish footballer
- Albert Dorfman (1916–1982), American biochemical geneticist
- Albert Dormer (1925–2014), English bridge player
- Albert Dorne (1906–1965), American illustrator and entrepreneur
- Albert Dorrington (1874–1953), English writer
- Albert Dossenbach (1891–1917), German flying ace
- Albert Doucet (born 1942), Canadian businessman and politician
- Albert Douglas (1852–1935), American lawyer and congressman from Ohio
- Albert B. Douglas (1912–1971), Canadian politician and wheat farmer
- Albert E. Douglas (1860–1908), Canadian physician and politician
- Albert Dovecar (1937–1962), French Army sergeant
- Albert G. Dow (1808–1908), American merchant, banker, and politician
- Albert Downing (1886–1915), New Zealand rugby union player and soldier
- Albert Downs (1905–1985), Australian rules footballer
- Albert Drach (1902–1995), Austrian-Jewish writer and lawyer
- Albert Draper (1895–1963), Canadian congressman from Manitoba
- Albert Drew (1906–1984), Australian cricketer
- Albert S. Drew (1843–1920), American businessman, civic activist, and political activist
- Albert Driedger (1936–2011), Canadian legislator from Manitoba
- Albert Thomas Dryer (1888–1963), Australian medical doctor and political activist
- Albert J. duBois (1906–1980), American Anglo-Catholic priest
- Albert Dubois-Pillet (1846–1890), French painter and army officer
- Albert Dubosq (1863–1940), Belgian scenographer
- Albert Dubout (1905–1976), French cartoonist, illustrator, painter, and sculptor
- Albert Dubuisson (1918–1974), Belgian racing cyclist
- Albert Duder (1856–1936), New Zealand mariner and harbormaster
- Albert Duffel (1813–1862), American Supreme Court justice from Louisiana
- Albert Dufour-Feronce (1868–1945), German diplomat
- Albert Dulk (1819–1884), German author
- Albert Dumouchel (1916–1971), Canadian printmaker, painter, and teacher
- Albert Duncanson (1911–2000), Canadian ice hockey player
- Albert Dunkley (1877–1949), English footballer
- Albert J. Dunlap (1937–2019), American corporate executive
- Albert Dunlop (1932–1990), English football goalkeeper
- Albert Dunn (1864–1937), British politician
- Albert T. Dunn (1842–1916), New Brunswick political figure
- Albert Elijah Dunning (1844–1923), American Congregationalist theologian
- Albert Dunstan (1882–1950), Australian politician
- Albert Dupontel (born 1964), French actor, film director, and screenwriter
- Albert Dupouy (1901–1973), French rugby union player
- Albert Dupuis (1877–1967), Belgian composer
- Albert Dupuy (born 1947), French civil servant
- Albert Durant (1892–unknown), Belgian water polo player
- Albert Dürer, German painter and theorist of the German Renaissance, regarded as one of the greatest painters of the Renaissance era
- Albert Alonzo Durham, American settler and founder of Lake Oswego, Oregon
- Albert W. Durley (1841–1914), American politician and lawyer
- Albert Duro (born 1978), Albanian footballer
- Albert Durston (1894–1959), English Royal Air Force officer
- Albert Duval, French sailor
- Albert Duvaleix (1893–1962), French actor
- Albert A. Dye (1845–1934), American politician, Mayor of Madison, Wisconsin from 1896 to 1897
- Albert Dyment (1869–1944), Canadian politician and businessman

==== E–M ====
- Albert Eagle, English mathematician and author
- Albert Whiggs Easmon (1865–1921), Sierra Leonean medical doctor
- Albert Edgar Eberlin (1895–1977), English architect
- Albert Eckhout (c. 1610–1665), Dutch painter
- Albert Edelfelt (1854–1905), Finnish-Swedish painter
- Albert J. Edmonds (born 1942), American United States Air Force lieutenant general
- Albert Edward (born 1991), Tanzanian-Australian footballer
- Albert Edwards (died 1918), English footballer
- Albert "Turk" Edwards (1907–1973), American football player
- Albert Gallatin Edwards (1812–1892), American politician
- Albert Eerola (1874–1950), Finnish politician
- Albert Egbe, Nigerian actor and producer
- Albert Gallatin Egbert (1828–1896), American congressman from Pennsylvania
- Albert Fredrik Eggen (1878–1966), Norwegian farmer and politician
- Albert Ehlman (1876–1930), American lawyer, schoolteacher, and professor
- Albert Ehrenstein (1886–1950), Austrian-German poet
- Albert Ehrensvärd (1867–1940), Swedish diplomat
- Albert Ehrhard (1862–1940), German Catholic theologian, church historian, and Byzantinist
- Albert Ehrhardt (1862–1929), British lawyer, judge, and colonial administrator
- Albert Eichelberger, Austrian luger
- Albert Eichhorn (1856–1926), German Protestant theologian
- Albert Einstein (1879–1955) German-born theoretical physicist, scientist, and philosopher who developed the theory of relativity, one of the two pillars of modern physics, widely regarded as one of the greatest scientists of all time
- Albert Eischen (1899–1949), Luxembourgish racing cyclist
- Albert Eisentraut, American artist
- Albert Ejupi (born 1992), Swedish footballer
- Albert Ekka (1942–1971), Indian Army soldier
- Albert Elias (1971–2012), American football agent and businessman
- Albert Elkus (1884–1962), American composer, pianist, and educator
- Albert R. Ellingwood (1887–1934), American mountaineer
- Albert Elliott (1869–1900), English rugby union player
- Albert Ellis (1869–1951), Australian prospector
- Albert Ellis (1889–1961), English footballer
- Albert Ellis (1913–2007), American psychologist and psychotherapist
- Albert Gallatin Ellis (1800–1885), American pioneer, settler, and Governor of Stevens Point, Wisconsin from 1860 to 1861, 1864–1866, 1867–1968, and 1869–1872
- Albert H. Ellis (1861–1950), American politician and farmer
- Albert Ellmenreich (1816–1905), German actor, writer, dancer, singer, and composer
- Albert Elmore (1904–1988), American college football player and coach, college basketball coach, and college athletics administrator
- Albert Elms (1920–2009), English composer and arranger
- Albert Eloy (1927–2008), French footballer
- Albert Elsen (1927–1995), American art historian and educator
- Albert Elton, American United States Air Force major general
- Albert Emon (born 1953), French football manager and footballer
- Albert Emptage (1917–1997), English footballer
- Albert Engel (died 1500), German Roman Catholic prelate
- Albert J. Engel (1888–1959), American congressman from Michigan
- Albert J. Engel Jr. (1924–2013), American United States circuit judge
- Albert Engström (1869–1940), Swedish artist, author, and academic
- Albert Eon (1894–1970), French head of military resistance
- Albert Erives (born 1972), American biologist
- Albert Russel Erskine (1871–1933), American businessman
- Albert Eschenlohr (1898–1938), German footballer
- Albert Eschenmoser (1925–2023), Swiss organic chemist
- Albert Español (born 1985), Spanish water polo player
- Albert Espinosa (born 1973), Spanish industrial engineer, screenwriter, playwright, writer, actor, and director
- Albert Estcourt (c. 1832–1909), English construction worker and builder
- Albert Estopinal (1845–1919), American soldier and congressman from Louisiana
- Albert Etter (1872–1950), American plant breeder
- Albert J. Ettinger (1919–2013), Canadian politician from Nova Scotia
- Albert Eulenburg (1840–1917), German neurologist
- Albert Eutropius (1888–1915), French rugby union player
- Albert Evans (1874–1966), English footballer
- Albert Evans (1901–1969), English footballer
- Albert Evans (1903–1988), British politician
- Albert Evans (1968–2015), American ballet dancer and choreographer
- Albert Evans (born 1989), American football player
- Albert Evans, Welsh footballer
- Albert S. Evans (died 1872), American explorer and writer
- Albert Evans-Jones (1895–1970), Welsh war poet and dramatist
- Albert Evers (1868–after 1890), English footballer
- Albert Ewing (1871–1946), Canadian politician and judge
- Albert Exendine (1884–1973), American football player, coach, and lawyer
- Albert Facchiano (1910–2011), American mobster
- Albert Facey (1894–1982), Australian writer
- Albert Facon (born 1943), French politician
- Albert Faille (1887–1973), Canadian pioneer, explorer, trapper, and prospector
- Albert Fairclough (1891–1958), English footballer
- Albert Fairfax (1870–1939), American politician
- Albert Falaux (1921–2013), French wrestler
- Albert Falco (1927–2012), French scuba diving pioneer
- Albert B. Fall (1861–1944), American senator from New Mexico who was convicted for his involvement in the Teapot Dome scandal
- Albert Falsan (1833–1902), French geologist and glaciologist
- Albert T. Fancher (1859–1930), American congressman from New York
- Albert Farmer (1864–?), English footballer
- Albert Brydges Farn (1841–1921), British entomologist
- Albert L. Farr (1871–1947), American architect
- Albert J. Farrah (1863–1944), American university dean
- Albert Farrar (1884–1954), English cricketer
- Albert Farrow (1886–1916), English footballer
- Albert Fathi (born 1951), Egyptian-French mathematician
- Albert Bernhardt Faust (1870–1951), American scholar
- Albert B. Fay (1913–1992), American businessman, politician. United States ambassador to Trinidad and Tobago (1976–1977)
- Albert Fear (1907–2000), Welsh rugby union player
- Albert Fearnley (1924–1999), English rugby league footballer
- Albert Fedosov (born 1970), Russian footballer
- Albert Fee (1880–1957), Canadian congressman from Alberta
- Albert Feebery (1889–1964), English footballer
- Albert Fennell (1920–1988), British film and television producer
- Albert Féraud (1921–2008), French sculptor and author
- Albert Ferber (1911–1987), Swiss pianist
- Albert E. Fernald (1838–1908), American soldier
- Albert Fernand-Renault (1887–1939), French painter
- Albert Ferrer (born 1970), Spanish footballer
- Albert Warren Ferris (1856–1937), American psychiatrist
- Albert Fert (born 1938), French physicist
- Albert Fertsch, American football and basketball coach
- Albert Feuerwerker (1927–2013), American historian
- Albert Fewtrell (1885–1950), Australian railway engineer and Australian Army senior officer
- Albert K. Fiadjoe, Ghanaian-Barbadian academic
- Albert Fichefet (1903–unknown), Belgian sports shooter
- Albert Field (1910–1990), Australian senator
- Albert Field (1916–2003), American art archivist
- Albert Fielder (1889–1947), English cricketer
- Albert Fields (born 1975), American actor and singer
- Albert Filozov (1937–2016), Soviet-Russian actor
- Albert Finch (1926–2003), British boxer
- Albert Fink (1827–1897), German-American civil engineer
- Albert Ernest Finley (1870–1923), Canadian physician and political figure
- Albert Finney, (1936–2019), English actor
- Albert Firth (1937–2015), English rugby league footballer
- Albert Fish (1870–1936), American serial killer, child rapist, and cannibal also known as the "Gray Man", the "Werewolf of Wysteria", the "Brooklyn Vampire", the "Moon Maniac", and "The Boogeyman"
- Albert Fish (1922–2006), Canadian realtor and politician
- Albert Fisher (1864–1942), American businessman
- Albert Fisher (1881–1937), English footballer
- Albert J. Fisher (1842–1882), American photographer
- Albert Kenrick Fisher (1856–1948), American ornithologist and author
- Albert Fishlow, American economist
- Albert Fitzgerald (1906–1982), American trade unionist
- Albert Fitzpatrick (born 1928), American journalist and media executive
- Albert Flahaut (1897–unknown), French racing cyclist
- Albert Flamen (c. 1620–after 1669), Flemish engraver, painter, and tapestry designer
- Albert Flamm (1823–1906), German painter
- Albert Fleet (1880–1953), English footballer
- Albert Fleischmann (1862–1942), German zoologist
- Albert Fletcher (1867–1940), English footballer
- Albert Fletcher (1898–unknown), English footballer
- Albert Lewis Fletcher (1896–1979), American Roman Catholic prelate
- Albert Flewitt (1872–1943), English footballer
- Albert Lange Fliflet (1908–2001), Norwegian philologist and translator
- Albert Florath (1888–1957), German actor
- Albert Flynn (1863–1933), British civil servant
- Albert Foan (1923–2009), English footballer
- Albert Foday (born 1985), Sierra Leonean footballer
- Albert Fogarty (born 1940), Canadian educator and politician
- Albert Folch Folch (born 1966), Spanish-Catalan scientist, writer, and artist
- Albert Folens (1916–2003), Belgian publisher
- Albert Fontenay, French servant and diplomat
- Albert Fontenot (born 1970), American football player
- Albert Fonó (1881–1972), Hungarian mechanical engineer
- Albert E. Foote (1846–1895), American mineralogist and physician
- Albert J. Fornace Jr. (born 1949), American molecular biologist and professor
- Albert Forns i Canal (born 1982), Catalan journalist, writer, and poet
- Albert Forslund (1881–1954), Swedish politician and trade union organizer
- Albert Forster (1902–1952), Nazi German politician and war criminal, Gauleiter of Danzig-West Prussia during the Second World War
- Albert Ernest Forsythe (1897–1986), American physician and pioneer aviator
- Albert P. Forsythe (1830–1906), American congressman from Illinois
- Albert Foulcher (died 2001), French murderer
- Albert Jennings Fountain (1838–1896), American congressman and attorney from New Mexico
- Albert Fourvelle (1916–?), Congolese politician
- Albert Moulton Foweraker (1873–1942), English painter
- Albert Fowler (1802–1883), American pioneer and politician
- Albert Fox (1867–1946), Australian cricketer
- Albert Fox (1881–1964), American chess master
- Albert E. Fox (1858–1914), English trade unionist and politician
- Albert Fraenkel (1848–1916), German physician
- Albert Fraenkel (1864–1938), German physician
- Albert Franck (1899–1973), Canadian artist
- Albert Frankel (architect) (1868–1957), Swedish architect
- Albert Bernhard Frank (1839–1900), German botanist, plant pathologist, and mycologist
- Albert Franklin (born 1948), American politician
- Albert Franks (1936–2017), English footballer
- Albert Fransella (1865–1935), Dutch flutist
- Albert T. Frantz (1903–1982), associate justice of the Colorado Supreme Court
- Albert Fratellini, Italian circus clown
- Albert Frazer, Irish Anglican priest
- Albert Frazier (1915–1999), American major league baseball player and football and baseball coach
- Albert Freedman (1922–2017), American television producer
- Albert Freeman (1844–1920), English cricketer
- Albert Freeman (1887–1945), English cricketer
- Albert Freeman (1899–unknown), English footballer
- Albert Freethy (1885–1966), Welsh rugby union referee and cricketer
- Albert French (born 1943), American author and publisher
- Albert Frère (1926–2018), Belgian businessman
- Albert Frey (1903–1998), Swiss-American architect
- Albert Frey (1913–2003), German Nazi commander
- Albert Frey-Wyssling (1900–1988), Swiss botanist
- Albert Frick (1714–1776), German theologian
- Albert Frick (born 1948), Liechtensteiner politician
- Albert Frick (born 1949), Liechtensteiner alpine skier
- Albert Friedländer (1888–1966), German-Swiss bank director and writer
- Albert Friedlander (1927–2004), German rabbi and teacher
- Albert D. Friesen (born 1947), Canadian biotechnologist
- Albert Friling (1879–unknown), Belgian footballer
- Albert Frink, American politician and businessman
- Albert J. Friscia (1911–1989), Italian-American sculptor
- Albert Fritz (1947–2019), German racing cyclist
- Albert Fritz (born 1959), South African politician and advocate
- Albert Frost (1878–1951), Australian cricketer
- Albert Frost (1914–2010), British businessman
- Albert Frost, South African blues singer, rock guitarist, and producer
- Albert Fryar (1875–1944), South Australian philatelist and sportsman
- Albert Fudge (1858–1949), English-Australian politician
- Albert Fulivai (born 1968), Australian rugby union and rugby league footballer
- Albert Fuller (1894–1969), British politician
- Albert Fuller (1926–2007), American harpsichordist, conductor, teacher, and impresario
- Albert W. Fuller (1854–1934), American architect
- Albert Henry Fullwood (1863–1930), Australian artist
- Albert Füracker (born 1968), German politician
- Albert Furrer, Swiss racing cyclist
- Albert Fytche (1820–1892), British Indian Army officer
- Albert Gabarayev (born 1997), Russian footballer
- Albert Gabbai (born 1949), American rabbi
- Albert Gabriel (1883–1972), French architect, archaeologist and art historian academic
- Albert Gadzhibekov (born 1988), Russian footballer
- Albert Gaillard (1858–1903), French mycologist
- Albert Galaburda (born 1948), Chilean cognitive and behavioral neurologist
- Albert Frédéric Jean Galeer (1810–1851), Swiss teacher and activist
- Albert J. Galen (1876–1936), American Supreme Court justice from Montana
- Albert Gall (1842–1905), American businessman and politician
- Albert Ernest Gallagher (1872–1940), British Infantry and colonial military police officer
- Albert Gallatin (1761–1849), Genevan-American politician, diplomat, ethnologist, and linguist
- Albert Eugene Gallatin (1881–1952), American artist
- Albert Gallo (born 1930), American mobster
- Albert F. Gallun (1865–1938), American businessman
- Albert Gallup (1796–1851), American congressman from New York
- Albert Gamse (1901–1974), American lyricist
- Albert Ganado (1924–2025), Maltese lawyer and historian
- Albert C. Gannaway (1920–2008), American film director, producer, and screenwriter
- Albert Ganzenmüller (1905–1996), German Nazi officer
- Albert Garcia (born 1970), Filipino politician
- Albert Gardiner (1867–1952), Australian politician
- Albert Gardner (1887–1923), English footballer
- Albert Creswell Garlington (1822–1885), American Confederate States Army brigadier general
- Albert Garzia (born 1977), Maltese composer, musician, and music teacher
- Albert Gaskell (1874–1950), Archdeacon of Rochdale from 1935 to 1950
- Albert Joseph Gasteiger (1823–1890), Austrian nobleman and engineering officer
- Albert Samuel Gatschet (1832–1907), Swiss-American ethnologist and linguist
- Albert Gaun (born 1992), Russian taekwondo practitioner
- Albert Gayton (1840–1923), Canadian merchant
- Albert Gazal (born 1950), Israeli footballer
- Albert Gazier (1908–1997), French trade union leader and politician
- Albert Geary (1900–1989), English cricketer
- Albert Geddes (1871–1935), New Zealand cricketer
- Albert Geldard (1914–1989), English footballer
- Albert Gelis (born 1981), Spanish Paralympic swimmer
- Albert Gelpi, American professor
- Albert Gemmrich (born 1955), French footballer
- Albert Gendelshtein (1906–1981), Soviet film director
- Albert Hermelink Gentiaras (1898–1983), Dutch Roman Catholic clergyman and bishop
- Albert Geouffre de Lapradelle (1871–1955), French jurisconsult
- Albert S. Gérard (1920–1996), Belgian scholar
- Albert Fredrick Ottomar Germann (1886–1976), American physical chemist, professor, and chemical entrepreneur
- Albert Geromini (1896–1961), Swiss ice hockey player
- Albert Gervais (1922–1989), Canadian politician
- Albert M. Gessler (1919–2003), American research chemist
- Albert Geutebrück (1801–1868), German classicist architect
- Albert Geyser (1918–1985), South African cleric, scholar, and theologian
- Albert C. Geyser, American physicist
- Albert Ghica (1868–1928), Romanian writer and socialite
- Albert Ghiorso (1915–2010), American nuclear scientist
- Albert Gicquel des Touches (1818–1901), French naval officer and author
- Albert Lee Giddens (born 1947), American lawyer
- Albert Gigaire (1872–1959), Canadian businessman, politician, and police officer
- Albert Giger (1946–2021), Swiss cross country skier
- Albert Gijsen (1915–2007), Dutch racing cyclist
- Albert Gilbert (1892–1955), English football goalkeeper
- Albert Gilbert (1922–2019), Canadian photographer
- Albert W. Gilchrist (1858–1926), American congressman, governor of Florida from 1909 to 1913
- Albert Gill (1879–1916), English British Army soldier, Victoria Cross recipient
- Albert Gilles (1895–1979), French coppersmith
- Albert Gillespie (1912–1938), Australian cricketer and Royal Air Force officer
- Albert Edouard Gilou (1910–1961), French art collector and art director
- Albert Girard (1595–1632), French-Dutch mathematician
- Albert Girard (1860–1914), American-Portuguese naturalist and zoologist
- Albert Girard (born 1949), Canadian businessman and politician
- Albert Giraud (1860–1929), Belgian poet
- Albert Girós (born 1952), Catalan painter and sculptor
- Albert Gittins (1897–1977), English cricketer
- Albert Gjedde (born 1946), Danish-Canadian neuroscientist
- Albert Gjerdrum (1869–1954), Norwegian jurist
- Albert Gladstone (1886–1967), British businessman and rower
- Albert Glandaz (1870–1943), French sailor
- Albert Glasser (1916–1998), American composer, conductor, and arranger
- Albert Glawinski (1852–unknown), American United States Army soldier, Medal of Honor recipient
- Albert Gleaves (1858–1937), American United States Navy admiral and naval historian
- Albert Gleizes (1881–1953), French artist, theoretician, and philosopher
- Albert Glinsky (born 1952), American composer and author
- Albert Glock (1925–1992), American archaeologist
- Albert Glotzer (1908–1999), American stenographer
- Albert Glover (1849–1941), New Zealand politician
- Albert Joseph Goblet d'Alviella (1790–1873), Belgian politician
- Albert J. Goddard (1863–1958), American congressman from Washington
- Albert Godderidge (1902–1976), English football goalkeeper
- Albert Earl Godfrey (1890–1982), Canadian Air Force flying ace
- Albert Goffin (died 1958), Belgian banker, civil servant, and governor of the National Bank of Belgium in 1941
- Albert Goldbarth (born 1948), American poet
- Albert Goldberg (1847–1905), German operatic baritone, opera director, and theater manager
- Albert Goldman (1897–1960), Belarusian-American political and civil rights lawyer
- Albert Goldman (1927–1994), American academic and author
- Albert Goldsmid (1846–1904), British officer
- Albert Goldstein (1943–2007), Croatian Jewish intellectual, writer, publisher, poet, and translator
- Albert Goldthorpe (1871–1943), English rugby footballer
- Albert Gollhofer (born 1954), German sport scientist and academic scholar
- Albert Gombault (1844–1904), French neurologist
- Albert Gomes (1911–1978), Trinidadian unionist, politician, and writer
- Albert Gonzalez (born 1981), American computer hacker, criminal, and police informer
- Albert Gooderham (1861–1935), Canadian distiller, financier, soldier, and philanthropist
- Albert Goodman (1880–1937), English politician
- Albert Goodwin (1845–1932), British landscape painter
- Albert Goodwin (1887–1918), Canadian coal miner and trade unionist
- Albert Goodwin (1906–1995), British academic and historian
- Albert T. Goodwyn (1842–1931), American congressman from Alabama
- Albert Goodyear, American archaeologist
- Albert Goossens, Belgian baritone singer
- Albert Goozee (1923–2009), British murderer and criminal
- Albert Hamilton Gordon (1901–2009), American businessman
- Albert L. Gordon (1915–2009), American attorney and gay rights activist
- Albert Gore, birth name of Al Gore (born 1948), 45th Vice President of the United States
- Albert Gore Sr. (1907–1998), American senator and congressman from Tennessee
- Albert Göring (1895–1966), German engineer and businessman
- Albert Görtz (born 1933), German football goalkeeper
- Albert Gottschalk (1866–1906), Danish painter
- Albert Goudreau (1887–1962), Canadian legislator from Quebec
- Albert Gould (1847–1936), Australian politician and solicitor
- Albert Gourlay (1881–1918), Australian rules footballer
- Albert Goutal (1918–2009), French cyclist
- Albert Gower-Rees (1880–1956), Canadian Anglican priest
- Albert Graf (born 1955), Austrian luger
- Albert Graff, American football coach
- Albert Gräfle (1809–1889), German painter
- Albert Grajales (born 1962), American intelligence consultant
- Albert Gran (1862–1932), Norwegian-American actor
- Albert Grant (1831–1899), Irish-British company promoter and politician
- Albert W. Grant (1856–1930), American United States Navy admiral
- Albert Alexander Gray (1868–1936), British physician and otologist
- Albert L. Gray (1847–1916), American merchant and politician
- Albert Grayland (1900–1963), English cricketer
- Albert Green (1869–1940), Australian politician
- Albert Green (1874–1941), British politician
- Albert Green (1892–1956), English footballer
- Albert Green (1907–1977), English footballer
- Albert Green, birth name of Al Green (born 1946), American R&B musician
- Albert Green, Welsh rugby league footballer
- Albert E. Green (1912–1999), British mathematician and research scientist
- Albert Greenberg, American software engineer and computer scientist
- Albert C. Greene (1792–1863), American lawyer and senator from Rhode Island
- Albert Gorton Greene (1802–1868), American judge and poet
- Albert M. Greenfield (1887–1967), Russian-American real estate broker and developer
- Albert Greenup (died 1952), British theologian and academic
- Albert Gregorius (1774–1853), Flemish-Belgian painter and academic
- Albert Gregory (1917–2010), English Royal Air Force Air Gunner
- Albert Grenier (1878–1961), French historian, theologian, and archaeologist
- Albert Grenier (born 1939), Canadian pianist, academic, and university administrator
- Albert Grévy (1823–1899), French lawyer and politician
- Albert Grey (1851–1917), British politician, Governor General of Canada from 1904 to 1911
- Albert Griffiths (1908–1970), British trade unionist
- Albert Grigg (1873–1959), Canadian merchant and politician
- Albert Gaspard Grimod (1772–1843), Bonapartist general and nobleman
- Albert Grisar (1808–1869), Belgian composer
- Albert Grisar (1870–1930), Belgian sailor
- Albert Grodet (1853–1933), French civil servant, colonial administrator, and politician
- Albert Lorey Groll (1866–1952), American artist and etcher
- Albert Grønbæk (born 2001), Danish footballer
- Albert Grossman (1926–1986), American entrepreneur and music manager
- Albert Groves (1883–after 1909), English footballer
- Albert Groves (1886–1960), Welsh footballer and manager
- Albert B. Groves (1866–1925), American architect
- Albert Grunow (1826–1914), German-Austrian chemist and phycologist
- Albert Grünwedel (1856–1935), German Indologist, Tibetologist, archaeologist, and explorer
- Albert Grzesinski (1879–1948), German politician, Minister of the Interior of Prussia from 1926 to 1930
- Albert N. Gualano, Italian-American writer
- Albert Guardado (born 1973), American light flyweight boxer
- Albert Guarnieri (1899–1980), American football player
- Albert Gubay (1928–2016), Welsh businessman and philanthropist
- Albert J. Guerard (1914–2000), American critic, novelist, and professor
- Albert Léon Guérard (1880–1959), American academic
- Albert Guérisse (1911–1989), Belgian Resistance member
- Albert Guillaume (1873–1942), French painter and caricaturist
- Albert Guille (1854–1914), French operatic tenor
- Albert Guillon (1801–1854), French composer
- Albert Guinchard (1914–1971), Swiss footballer
- Albert Guinon (1863–1923), French playwright
- Albert Guinovart (born 1962), Spanish composer
- Albert Günther (1830–1914), German-British zoologist, ichthyologist, and herpetologist
- Albert Guðmundsson (1923–1994), Icelandic footballer
- Albert Guðmundsson (born 1958), Icelandic footballer
- Albert Guðmundsson (born 1997), Icelandic footballer
- Albert Brewer Guptill (1854–1931), American author and photographer
- Albert Gurule (born around 1944), American activist and politician
- Albert Paris Gütersloh (1887–1973), Austrian painter and writer
- Albert Gutterson (1887–1865), American long jumper
- Albert Brown Guynes (1848–1929), American congressman from Mississippi
- Albert Guyot (1881–1947), French racing driver
- Albert Gyulay (1766–1835), Hungarian Army soldier
- Albert "Bert" Haanstra (1916–1997), Dutch film director
- Albert W. Hachmeister (1918–1980), American publisher and congressman from Illinois
- Albert Hackett (1900–1995), American actor, dramatist, and screenwriter
- Albert Hackley, American major league baseball player
- Albert Hadley (1920–2012), American interior designer and decorator
- Albert Haepers, Belgian gymnast
- Albert Hagar (1827–1924), Canadian merchant and politician
- Albert Viljam Hagelin (1881–1946), Norwegian businessman and opera singer
- Albert David Hager (1817–1888), American geologist, librarian, and historian
- Albert Hague (1920–2001), German-American songwriter and actor
- Albert Hahl (1868–1945), German colonial administrator
- Albert Hahn (1877–1918), Dutch political cartoonist, caricaturist, poster artist, and book cover designer
- Albert Haight (1842–1926), American lawyer and politician from New York
- Albert R. Haines (1826–unknown), American senator from Ohio
- Albert Hainz (born 1964), Austrian cyclist
- Albert Hakim (1936–2003), Iranian-American businessman
- Albert Halder (1855–1901), German architect, civil engineer, and businessman
- Albert Hale (1950–2021), American attorney and congressman from Arizona
- Albert W. Hale (1882–1947), French-American director and producer
- Albert Hales (born 1932), Australian politician
- Albert Hall (1878–1941), English engineer and inventor
- Albert Hall (1918–1998), Welsh footballer
- Albert Hall (1934–2008), American hammer thrower
- Albert Hall (born 1937), American actor
- Albert Hall (born 1958), American major league baseball player
- Albert R. Hall (1841–1905), American farmer, businessman, and congressman from Minnesota and Wisconsin
- Albert R. Hall (1884–1969), American educator and congressman from Indiana
- Albert Hallam (1869–1940), English off spin bowler
- Albert Hallworth (1898–1962), British trade unionist
- Albert Halper (1904–1984), American novelist and playwright
- Albert Halsall (1942–2011), English rugby league footballer
- Albert Halton (1893–1971), English British Army private, Victoria Cross recipient
- Albert F. N. Hambleton (1857–1922), American congressman from Iowa
- Albert Hammond (1883–1968), American businessman and congressman from Wisconsin
- Albert Hammond (1924–1989), English footballer
- Albert Hammond (born 1944), British-Gibraltarian singer, songwriter, and record producer
- Albert Hammond Jr. (born 1980), American musician
- Albert Handcock (1863–1937), Irish peer and landowner
- Albert Hänel (1833–1918), German jurist, legal historian, and politician
- Albert Hanken (1926–2016), Dutch mathematician, inventor, and professor
- Albert Hankey (1914–1998), English football goalkeeper
- Albert James Hannan (1887–1965), Australian lawyer
- Albert Hansen (1871–1943), American college football player, coach, and congressman from Iowa
- Albert Hanson (1913–1971), English politician and academic
- Albert J. Hanson (1867–1914), Australian artist
- Albert Hansson (born 2004), Swedish golfer
- Albert Harbot (1896–1968), English badminton player
- Albert Hardenberg (c. 1510–1574), Dutch theologian and Protestant reformer
- Albert Hardie Jr. (born 1987), American professional wrestler
- Albert Harding (cricketer)) (1918–1989), Trinidadian cricketer
- Albert Austin Harding (1880–1958), American college band director
- Albert Hare (1887–1969), British track and field runner
- Albert Harjo (1937–2019), American artist
- Albert Harkness (1822–1907), American classical scholar and educator
- Albert Harland (1869–1957), British politician
- Albert Harley (1940–1993), English footballer
- Albert Harrington (1850–1914), American grain merchant and businessman
- Albert Harris (1912–1995), English footballer
- Albert Harris (1916–2005), English orchestrator, arranger, and composer for film
- Albert Harris, English footballer and football manager
- Albert Edward Harris (c. 1870–1933), British engineer and artist
- Albert L. Harris (1869–1933), American architect
- Albert Harrison (1904–unknown), English footballer
- Albert Harrison (1909–1989), English footballer
- Albert Harrison (1940–2015), American psychologist and professor
- Albert Galliton Harrison (1800–1839), American congressman from Missouri
- Albert Harry (1903–1981), Australian rugby league footballer
- Albert Bushnell Hart (1854–1943), American historian, writer, and editor
- Albert Hartkopf (1889–1968), Australian cricketer and Australian rules footballer
- Albert Hartl (1904–1982), German Catholic priest
- Albert Hartshorne (1839–1910), English archaeologist
- Albert Harvey (1843–1912), Scottish rugby union player and textile merchant
- Albert W. Harvey (1879–1956), American businessman and government official from Vermont
- Albert Hasibuan (1939–2022), Indonesian politician
- Albert Hassell (born 1936), Barbadian cricketer
- Albert Young Hassell (1841–1918), Australian pastoralist and politician
- Albert Hassler (1903–1994), French ice hockey player and speed skater
- Albert Baird Hastings (1895–1987), American biochemist and physiologist
- Albert Hatton (1879–1963), English footballer
- Albert Hauck (1845–1918), German theologian and church historian
- Albert Hauf (born 1938), Majorcan philologist, literature historian, and literary critic
- Albert Haug (1925–2001), Swiss footballer
- Albert J. Hausbeck (1918–1999), American congressman from New York
- Albert Gallatin Hawes (1804–1849), American congressman from Kentucky
- Albert Hawkes (1887–1962), Australian rugby league footballer
- Albert King Hawkes (1848–1916), American optometrist, inventor, and philanthropist
- Albert W. Hawkes (1878–1971), American senator from New Jersey
- Albert Hawkins (1886–1969), Welsh gymnast
- Albert F. Hayden (1865–1962), American judge
- Albert Hayes (1895–?), English footballer
- Albert Hayhurst (1905–1991), English cricketer and footballer
- Albert Haynesworth (born 1981), American football player
- Albert Hazlett (c. 1836–1860), American involved in John Brown's raid on Harpers Ferry
- Albert Victor Heal (1887–1975), English architect and designer
- Albert Frederick Healy (1873–1944), Canadian lawyer and politician
- Albert Heard (1833–1890), American banker and diplomat
- Albert Heath (born 1935), American jazz drummer
- Albert J. R. Heck (born 1964), Dutch scientist and professor
- Albert Hedderich (born 1957), German rower
- Albert Heer (1891–1972), Canadian building contractor and politician
- Albert Heffer (1933–2013), South African cricketer
- Albert Francis Hegenberger (1895–1983), American United States Air Force major general
- Albert Hehn (1908–1983), German actor
- Albert Heijn (1865–1945), Dutch entrepreneur, founder of the Dutch food retailer Albert Heijn
- Albert Heijn Jr. (1927–2011), Dutch entrepreneur, stockholder, and businessman
- Albert Heijnneman (1898–1944), Dutch sprinter
- Albert Heikenwälder (1898–1953), Austrian footballer
- Albert Heilmann (1886–1949), German architect and contractor
- Albert Heim (1849–1937), Swiss geologist
- Albert Heine (1867–1949), German-Jewish stage and film actor
- Albert S. Heinrich (1889–1974), American pioneer aviator
- Albert Heisé (1899–1951), French sprinter
- Albert Held (1866–1924), American architect
- Albert Helgerud (1876–1954), Norwegian rifle shooter
- Albert Hellyer (1860–1945), Canadian congressman from Ontario
- Albert M. Hemeon (1843–1896), Canadian merchant and politician from Nova Scotia
- Albert Hemming (1910–1987), Irish soldier, George Cross recipient
- Albert Hemmo (born 1934), Egyptian-born Israeli basketball player
- Albert Hemrom (born 1970), Indian prelate
- Albert Henderickx (1900–1965), Belgian footballer
- Albert Henderson (1881–1947), Canadian soccer player
- Albert Henderson (1915–2004), American actor
- Albert H. Henderson (1893–1951), American lawyer, politician, and judge
- Albert John Henderson (1920–1999), American United States circuit judge
- Albert Hendrickx (1916–1990), Belgian racing cyclist
- Albert Leon Henne (1901–1967), American chemist
- Albert Henraux (1881–1953), French arts administrator
- Albert Henry (c. 1880–1909), Australian cricketer
- Albert Henry (1906–1981), Cook Island politician
- Albert Henry (1910–2002), Belgian Romance philologist and political activist
- Albert Henry, Australian rugby union player
- Albert Hensel (1895–1942), German politician
- Albert Henze (1894–1979), German Nazi general
- Albert Herbert (1925–2008), British artist, painter, and etcher
- Albert J. Herberger (1931–2022), American United States Navy Vice Admiral
- Albert Heremans (1906–1997), Belgian footballer
- Albert Herger (1942–2009), Swiss racing cyclist
- Albert Herman (1887–1958), American actor, screenwriter, and film director
- Albert Hermanson (1881–1960), Swedish-Canadian farmer and politician
- Albert Hermoso Farras (born 1978), Spanish horse rider
- Albert William Herre (1868–1962), American ichthyologist and lichenologist
- Albert Herren (born 1952), American congressman from Massachusetts
- Albert Herrmann (1886–1945), German archaeologist and geographer
- Albert E. Herrnstein (1882–1958), American football player and coach
- Albert Hertel (1843–1912), German painter
- Albert Herter (1871–1950), American painter, illustrator, muralist, and interior designer
- Albert Hertzog (1899–1982), South African politician, Afrikaner nationalist, and cabinet minister
- Albert Herzfeld (1865–1943), German painter
- Albert Heschong (1919–2001), American art director and production designer
- Albert John Hesse (1895–1987), South African entomologist
- Albert Hetterle (1918–2006), German actor and theater intendant
- Albert Heux (1892–1980), French racing cyclist
- Albert Hewitt (1866–1947), Australian cricketer
- Albert Heyche (born 1949), Belgian rower
- Albert Heywood (1913–1989), English football goalkeeper
- Albert Hibbs (1924–2003), American mathematician and physicist
- Albert Hickman (1875–1943), Canadian politician, Prime Minister of Newfoundland from May to June 1924
- Albert W. Hicks (c. 1820–1860), American pirate and murderer
- Albert Hilger (1839–1905), German pharmacologist and chemist
- Albert Hill (1889–1969), British track and field runner
- Albert Hill (1895–1971), English British Army private, Victoria Cross recipient
- Albert Hill (1896–1969), American college football player
- Albert E. Hill (1870–1933), American congressman and senator from Tennessee
- Albert G. Hill (1910–1996), American physicist
- Albert Ross Hill (1868–1943), American educator and university president
- Albert Hillary (1868–1954), English chocolate manufacturer, businessman, and politician
- Albert W. Hillestad (1924–2007), American Episcopal priest and bishop
- Albert Hilton (1862–1935), English cricketer
- Albert Hilton (1908–1977), British farm laborer and trade union official
- Albert Henry Hime (1842–1919), Irish British Army Royal Engineers officer and politician
- Albert Hinchcliffe (1860–1935), English trade union organizer
- Albert Hinchley (1869–1922), English football goalkeeper
- Albert Hiorth (1876–1949), Norwegian engineer
- Albert O. Hirschman (1915–2012), German economist and author
- Albert Hitchen (1938–2015), English racing cyclist, team manager, and engineer
- Albert Ho (何俊仁, born 1951), Hong Kong solicitor and politician
- Albert Hobbs (1822–1897), American lawyer and congressman from New York
- Albert Hobson (1925–2017), English footballer
- Albert John Hockings (1826–1890), Australian politician
- Albert Hodge (1875–1917/1918), Scottish sculptor
- Albert Hodges (1861–1944), American chess master
- Albert Hodgini (1884–1962), English circus performer
- Albert Hodgkinson (1895–1975), English British Army Lance Corporal, Distinguished Conduct Medal recipient
- Albert Hoffa (1859–1907), German surgeon, orthopedist, and physiotherapist
- Albert Hoffman (1915–1993), American painter and wood carver
- Albert Hoffmann (1907–1972), German entrepreneur and Nazi propagandist
- Albert Hoffmann (1846–1924), German rosarian
- Albert Hofman (born 1951), Dutch clinical epidemiologist
- Albert Hofman (born 2003), Romanian footballer
- Albert Hofmann (1906–2008), Swiss chemist and author
- Albert Hofstadter (1910–1989), American philosopher
- Albert Hofstede (1940–2016), American politician, Mayor of Minneapolis, Minnesota (1974–1975, 1978–1979)
- Albert Gallatin Hoit (1809–1856), American painter
- Albert L. Holladay (1805–1856), American Presbyterian minister, educator, and college president
- Albert Woldemar Hollander (1796–1868), German educator and pedagog
- Albert Hollingworth (1910–1968), Australian rules footballer
- Albert Holmes (1885–unknown), English footballer
- Albert Holmes (born 1942), English footballer
- Albert Holt (born 1936), Australian Aboriginal elder
- Albert Holway (1902–1968), Canadian ice hockey player
- Albert Edwin Honeywell (1878–1956), Canadian barrister and politician
- Albert Hood (1964–1994), American weightlifter
- Albert Hope (1914–1966), New Zealand rower
- Albert Cole Hopkins (1837–1911), American congressman from Pennsylvania
- Albert J. Hopkins (1846–1922), American congressman and senator from Illinois
- Albert L. Hopkins (1931–2016), American computer designer
- Albert Hopoate (born 1985), Australian rugby league and rugby union footballer
- Albert Hopoate (born 2001), Australian rugby league footballer
- Albert Horne (born 1980), South African chorus master and orchestral conductor
- Albert Horner (1913–2009), Canadian politician, grain producer, and livestock breeder
- Albert Horsell (1909–1982), Australian rugby league footballer
- Albert Horsfall (born 1941), Nigerian security and intelligence official
- Albert Horsley (1866–1954), Canadian miner convicted for the assassination of Frank Steunenberg
- Albert Clinton Horton (1798–1865), American congressman from Texas, Lieutenant Governor of Texas (1846–1847)
- Albert H. Horton (1837–1902), American Supreme Court chief justice from Kansas
- Albert Hotopp (1886–1942), German political activist and writer
- Albert Hough (1877–1960), English bowls player
- Albert C. Houghton (1844–1914), American businessman and politician, Mayor of North Adams, Massachusetts (1896–1897)
- Albert Hourani (1915–1993), Lebanese-British historian
- Albert House (1890–1966), New Zealand rugby union and rugby league footballer
- Albert Houssiau (1924–2026), Belgian Catholic prelate and bishop
- Albert Houthuesen (1903–1979), Dutch-British artist
- Albert Houtin (1867–1926), French Catholic theologian and historian
- Albert Houtum-Schindler (1846–1916), British scholar and politician
- Albert Hovhannisyan (2001–2020), Amernian Army junior sergeant
- Albert Howard (1828–1910), American politician, lieutenant governor of Rhode Island (1877–1880)
- Albert Howard (1873–1947), English botanist
- Albert Howcroft (1882–1955), English cricketer
- Albert R. Howe (1840–1884), American businessman, Union Army major, and politician
- Albert Howell (1898–1958), English cricketer
- Albert Howell, Canadian comedian, actor, and writer
- Albert Howson (1881–1960), American actor and head of the censorship department of Warner Bros.
- Albert G. Howson (1931–2022), British mathematician and educationist
- Albert Harrison Hoyt (1826–1915), American editor and author
- Albert Hudson (1875–1947), Canadian politician, lawyer, and judge from Manitoba
- Albert Huegli (1913–1998), American professor and academic administrator
- Albert Huffstickler (1927–2002), American poet
- Albert Huggins (born 1997), American football player
- Albert Hughes (1878–1954), Irish Bishop
- Albert Hughes (1899–1969), Canadian ice hockey player
- Albert Hughes (born 1972), American film director, producer, and screenwriter, working alongside his twin brother Allen
- Albert Huie (1920–2010), Jamaican painter
- Albert W. Hull (1880–1966), American physicist and electrical engineer
- Albert Hulsebosch (1897–1982), American track and field runner
- Albert Hulzebosch (born 1949), Dutch racing cyclist
- Albert H. Humes (1867–1947), American architect
- Albert S. Humphrey (1926–2005), American business and management consultant
- Albert Humphreys (1864–1922), American sculptor and painter
- Albert Hunt, American mechanical engineer and inventor
- Albert C. Hunt (1888–1956), American lawyer and Supreme Court judge from Oklahoma
- Albert Hunter (1900–1969), British politician
- Albert John Hunting (died 1946), Australian inventor and entrepreneur
- Albert F. Huntt (c. 1868–1920), American architect
- Albert Snouck Hurgronje (1903–1967), Dutch footballer
- Albert Huser (born 1936), German weightlifter
- Albert Hinrich Hussmann (1874–1946), German artist and sculptor
- Albert Husson (1912–1978), French playwright and theatre director
- Albert Hustin (1882–1967), Belgian medical doctor
- Albert Hutchinson (1910–1974), English footballer
- Albert Huybrechts (1899–1938), Belgian composer
- Albert Huybrechts (1915–unknown), Belgian sailor
- Albert Hwang, American artist
- Albert Montefiore Hyamson (1875–1954), British civil servant and historian
- Albert Hybart (1865–1945), Welsh rugby union footballer
- Albert Hyman (1893–1972), American cardiologist
- Albert Hyzler (1916–1993), Maltese politician, Acting President of Malta (1981–1982)
- Albert Ilemobade (1936–2015), Nigerian veterinary parasitologist
- Albert Iles (1914–1979), English footballer
- Albert Illingworth (1865–1942), British businessman and politician
- Albert Graham Ingalls (1888–1958), American scientific editor and astronomer
- Albert Ingham (1900–1967), English mathematician
- Albert Ingman (1871–1948), Finnish house painter and politician
- Albert Inkpin (1884–1944), British politician
- Albert Innaurato (1947–2017), American playwright, theatre director, and writer
- Albert L. Ireland (1918–1997), American United States Marine Corps staff sergeant
- Albert Iremonger (1884–1958), English football goalkeeper
- Albert Ireton (1879–1947), British tug of war competitor and boxer
- Albert Irvin (1922–2015), English artist
- Albert Irvine (1898–1975), English footballer
- Albert Irwin (1917–2006), Canadian alpine skier
- Albert Augustus Isaacs (1826–1903), British clergyman, historian, and anthropologist
- Albert Isley (1871–1953), American judge, lawyer, and senator from Illinois
- Albert Isola, Gibraltarian barrister and politician
- Albert Iten (born 1962), Swiss cross-country and downhill mountain biker
- Albert Ivanov (1931–2000), Soviet long-distance runner
- Albert Carlo Iversen (1895–1944), Danish person executed by Nazi Germany
- Albert Ely Ives (1898–1966), American architect
- Albert Jacka (1893–1932), Australian Imperial Force Captain, Victoria Cross recipient
- Albert G. Jackes (1844–1888), Canadian politician and doctor
- Albert Jackson (1857–1918), Canadian mail carrier
- Albert Jackson (1943–2014), English footballer
- Albert Bruce Jackson (1876–1947), British botanist and dendrologist
- Albert Jacob (1858–1929), British politician
- Albert Jacob (born 1980), Australian politician
- Albert C. Jacobs, American college chancellor
- Albert Marius Jacobsen (1838–1909), Norwegian military officer and politician
- Albert E. Jacomb (c. 1873–1946), British printer and politician
- Albert Jacquard (1925–2013), French geneticist, scientist, and essayist
- Albert Jaegers (1868–1925), American sculptor
- Albert Jäger (1801–1891), Austrian priest and historian
- Albert E. James (c. 1892–1952), American judge
- Albert Janesch (1889–1973), Austrian painter
- Albert S. Janin (1881–1931), American aviation pioneer and inventor
- Albert E. Jarrell (1901–1977), American U.S. Navy officer
- Albert Jarrett (born 1984), Sierra Leonean footballer
- Albert Järvinen (1950–1991), Finnish guitarist
- Albert Jeck (born 1935), German economist
- Albert W. Jefferis (1868–1942), American congressman from Nebraska
- Albert Jelley (1894–1966), New Zealand cricket umpire
- Albert Jenicot (1885–1916), French footballer
- Albert Jenkin (1872–1961), English rugby union player
- Albert Jenkins (1861–1940), English footballer
- Albert Jenkins (1895–1953), Welsh rugby union player
- Albert G. Jenkins (1830–1864), American attorney, planter, politician, and military officer
- Albert Jenkinson (1884–unknown), English rugby league footballer
- Albert Jenks (1869–1953), American anthropologist and professor
- Albert E. Jenner Jr. (1907–1988), American lawyer
- Albert Jensen (1847–1913), Danish architect
- Albert Jesionek (1870–1935), German dermatologist
- Albert Jewell (1886–1913), American aviator
- Albert G. Jewett (1802–1885), American politician
- Albert Jodlbauer (1871–1945), German pharmacologist and toxicologist
- Albert Johanneson (1940–1995), South African footballer
- Albert Johannsen (1871–1962), American geologist and geology professor
- Albert Johansson (born 2001), Swedish ice hockey player
- Albert Johnson (1869–1957), American congressman from Washington
- Albert Johnson (1880–1941), Canadian soccer player
- Albert Johnson (1880–1963), American track and field athlete
- Albert Johnson (c. 1890/1900–1932), North American criminal also known as the "Mad Trapper of Rat River"
- Albert Johnson (1900–1966), American horse jockey and trainer
- Albert Johnson (1918–1998), English rugby league footballer
- Albert Johnson (1920–2011), English footballer
- Albert Johnson (1923–1989), English footballer
- Albert Johnson (1931–2011), British racewalker
- Albert Johnson (1934/1935–1984), American politician; mayor of Las Cruces, New Mexico (1976–1980)
- Albert Johnson (born 1977), Canadian football player
- Albert Johnson, American congressman from Mississippi
- Albert Johnson, birth name of rapper Prodigy (rapper) of Mobb Deep
- Albert Ariel Bedwin Johnson (1914–1996), English tennis player
- Albert Mussey Johnson (1872–1948), eccentric multimillionaire and builder of Scotty's Castle
- Albert Tilford Johnson (1851–1916), American banker
- Albert W. Johnson, Republican member of the U.S. House of Representatives from Pennsylvania
- Albert Wesley Johnson (1923–2010), Canadian civil servant, professor, political scientist, and author
- Albert Williams Johnson (1872–1957), American United States District Court judge in Pennsylvania
- Albert Johnston (1891–1961), Australian rugby league footballer
- Albert C. Johnston (1900/1901–1988), American doctor
- Albert Sidney Johnston (1803–1862), American Texian Army general, United States Army general, and Confederate States Army general
- Albert Jolis (1912–2000), American diamond dealer
- Albert Jones (1883–1963), Welsh footballer
- Albert Beckford Jones (born 1958), American executive, entrepreneur, scientist, and businessman
- Albert Edward Jones (1878–1954), English silversmith and designer
- Albert Gamaliel Jones (1812–1880), American carpenter
- Albert F. Jones (1858–1920), American lawyer and senator from California
- Albert F. A. L. Jones (1920–2013), New Zealand astronomer
- Albert M. Jones (1890–1967), American United States Army major general
- Albert R. Jonsen (1931–2020), American bioethicist
- Albert Jordan (c. 1821–1872), American architect
- Albert Jordens (1902–1949), Belgian racing cyclist
- Albert N. Jorgensen (1899–1978), American academic administrator
- Albert Joris (1915–unknown), Belgian sprint canoeist
- Albert Jorquera (born 1979), Spanish football goalkeeper
- Albert Joscelyne (1866–1945), English-Anglican clergyman
- Albert Jourda (1893–1961), French footballer
- Albert Journeay (1890–1972), American football player
- Albert Charles Joyce (1886–1973), Australian auditor
- Albert Jud (1912–?), Swiss sprinter
- Albert Francis Judd (1838–1900), Hawaiian Kingdom judge
- Albert Francis Judd Jr. (1874–1939), American lawyer and trust officer
- Albert Judson (1885–1975), English cricketer
- Albert Juliussen (1920–1982), English footballer
- Albert Jull (1864–1940), New Zealand politician
- Albert Kaçi (born 1981), Albanian footballer
- Albert Kägi (1912–unknown), Swiss cyclist
- Albert Kahn (1860–1940), French banker and philanthropist
- Albert Kahn (1869–1942), American industrial architect
- Albert E. Kahn (1912–1979), American journalist, photographer, and author
- Albert M. Kales (1875–1922), American lawyer and legal scholar
- Albert Kallio (1884–1945), Finnish politician
- Albert Kalonji (1929–2015), Congolese politician
- Albert Kalthoff (1850–1906), German Protestant theologian
- Albert Kaltschmidt (1871–unknown), German industrialist and convicted terrorist
- Albert Kamehameha (1858–1862), Hawaiian son of Kamehameha IV and Queen Emma
- Albert Kan-Dapaah (born 1953), Ghanaian accountant and politician, Ghana's Minister of National Security (2017–present)
- Albert Kandlbinder, German bobsledder
- Albert Kanta Kambala (1958–2008), Congolese footballer
- Albert Kanter (1897–1973), Russian-born American comic book publisher
- Albert Kapengut (born 1944), Soviet chess master
- Albert Kapikian (1930–2014), Armenian-American virologist
- Albert Kappis (1836–1914), German painter and drafter
- Albert Kapsky (born 1997), Belarusian footballer
- Albert Karasu (1885–1982), Jewish-Turkish journalist
- Albert Karaziwan (born 1958), Syrian-Belgian businessman
- Albert Kariyawasam (1921–unknown), Sri Lankan politician
- Albert Karubuy (1915–unknown), Indonesian politician and activist
- Albert Katz (1858–1923), Polish rabbi, writer, and journalist
- Albert Katzenellenbogen (1863–1942), German legal advisor
- Albert Kautz (1839–1907), American United States Navy Rear admiral
- Albert Kawal (1912–1990), American football and basketball player and college football, basketball, and baseball coach
- Albert Kawana (born 1956), Namibian politician
- Albert Kay (1895–1975), English footballer
- Albert Kaye (1872–1935), English footballer
- Albert Kayser (1898–1944), German trades union official, political activist, and politician
- Albert Kazimirski de Biberstein (1808–1887), French orientalist, Arabist, dictionary author, and translator
- Albert Keary (1886–1962), English footballer
- Albert Keast (1895–1969), New Zealand cricketer and journalist
- Albert Keates (1862–1949), English pipe organ builder
- Albert Keating (1902–1984), English footballer
- Albert Keck (1930–1990), German footballer
- Albert Keep (1826–1907), American railroad official and financer
- Albert Galloway Keller (1874–1956), American sociologist and author
- Albert H. Kelley (1894–1989), American film director
- Albert J. Kelley (1924–2004), American United States Navy officer and NASA guidance systems engineer
- Albert Kellogg (1813–1887), American physician and botanist
- Albert Kelly (born 1991), Australian rugby league footballer
- Albert Kelsey (1870–1950), American architect
- Albert Kemp, English rugby union and rugby league footballer from the 1890s and 1900s
- Albert Edward Kemp (1858–1929), Canadian businessman and politician
- Albert Kempster (1874–1952), British sports shooter
- Albert Kendra (1883–1942), Estonian politician
- Albert Kenessey (1889–1973), Hungarian surgeon and hospital director
- Albert Kennedy (1906–1991), Irish police officer
- Albert W. Kenner (1889–1959), American United States Army major general
- Albert Kent (1877–1923), Canadian football player and coach
- Albert Fenner Kercheval (1829–1893), American farmer
- Albert Kerr (1889–1941), Canadian ice hockey player
- Albert Kerr, British slalom canoeist
- Albert "Bert" Kesselring (1885–1960), German military officer and convicted war criminal
- Albert H. Ketcham (1870–1935), American orthodontist
- Albert Ketèlbey (1875–1959), English composer, conductor, and pianist
- Albert Kevend (1883–1945), Estonian politician
- Albert Sybrandus Keverling Buisman (1890–1944), Dutch civil engineer and professor
- Albert Kewene (born 1939/1940), New Zealand dentist
- Albert Khachumyan (born 1999), Armenian footballer
- Albert Khelfa (born 1945), Canadian politician
- Albert Khinchagov (born 1996), Russian para-athlete
- Albert Khoshaba (born 1944), Iraqi footballer
- Albert Kidd (born 1961), Scottish footballer
- Albert Clements Killam (1849–1908), Canadian lawyer, politician, railway commissioner, and Supreme Court judge
- Albert Kimmerling (1882–1912), French pioneer aviator
- Albert Kindler (1833–1876), German genre painter
- Albert Kinert (1919–1987), Yugoslav artist and illustrator
- Albert King (1878–1946), South African cricket umpire
- Albert "Bertie" King (1912–1981), Jamaican jazz and mento musician
- Albert King (1923–1992), American blues guitarist and singer
- Albert King (born 1959), American basketball player
- Albert Freeman Africanus King (1841–1914), English-American physician
- Albert Kingsbury (1863–1943), American engineer, inventor, and entrepreneur
- Albert Kingwell (1863–1949), English architect, surveyor, and land agent
- Albert Kinross (1870–1929), English journalist, magazine editor, and writer
- Albert Kinsey (born 1945), English footballer
- Albert Kipalan (1900s–2008), Guinean politician
- Albert Hamilton Kipp (1850–1906), American architect
- Albert Kiralfy (1915–2001), English legal scholar
- Albert Király, Hungarian noble and Transylvanian military captain
- Albert Kirchner (1860–1902), French photographer, manufacturer, exhibitor, and filmmaker known under the pseudonym Léar
- Albert Kirvan (1870–1951), Canadian politician from Manitoba
- Albert D. Kirwan (1904–1971), American football coach and university administrator
- Albert Kish (1937–2015), Canadian documentarian and filmmaker
- Albert Kitson (1863–1944), British peer and bank director
- Albert Kitson (1868–1937), British-Australian geologist, naturalist, and Lyell Medal recipient
- Albert Kivikas (1898–1978), Estonian writer and journalist
- Albert Klapstein (born 1940), Canadian politician from Alberta
- Albert Kligman (1916–2010), American dermatologist
- Albert Jansz. Klomp (1625–1688), Dutch painter
- Albert Kluyver (1888–1956), Dutch microbiologist and biochemist
- Albert Knapp (1798–1864), German poet and animal welfare activist
- Albert Knight (1817–after 1881), Canadian merchant and politician from Quebec
- Albert Knight (1872–1946), English cricketer
- Albert Knight (1900–1964), British diver
- Albert Decatur Kniskern (1861–1930), American brigadier general
- Albert Knoll (1796–1863), Austrian dogmatic theologian
- Albert Knowles (1871–1950), English footballer
- Albert Knowles (1885–1953), British trade union leader
- Albert C. Knudson (1873–1953), American Christian theologian
- Albert Knutti (1912–1997), Swiss racing cyclist
- Albert S. Kobayashi (born 1924), American engineer and scientist
- Albert Kocer (1930–2018), American congressman from South Dakota
- Albert Koebele (1853–1924), German economic entomologist and biological pioneer
- Albert Köhl (1879–1954), French-Swedish chef
- Albert Komp (1845–1910), German-American painter
- Albert Kongsbak (1877–1958), Danish artist
- Albert Kónya (1917–1988), Hungarian physicist and politician
- Albert Koochooei, Iranian writer, journalist, translator, and radio broadcaster
- Albert Kookesh (1948–2021), American congressman from Alaska
- Albert Kopfermann (1846–1914), German musicologist and librarian
- Albert Kopytich (born 2002), Belarusian footballer
- Albert Korir (born 1994), Kenyan long-distance runner
- Albert Kálmán Kőrössy (1869–1955), Hungarian architect
- Albert Koskinen (1925–2004), Finnish high jumper
- Albert Kostanian (born 1980), Lebanese politician and journalist
- Albert Köster (1862–1924), German theater scholar
- Albert Kostin (1892–1984), American painter
- Albert Kotin (1907–1980), American painter
- Albert Kowert (born 1989), German coxswain
- Albert Krais, German slalom canoeist
- Albert Krajmer (1933–2014), Slovak rower
- Albert Krantz (c. 1450–1517), German historian
- Albert Kraus (born 1980), Dutch kickboxer
- Albert Krause (1882–1961), American wood sculptor and painter
- Albert Krauss, Slovak luger
- Albert Krawczyk (born 1934), American congressman from Vermont
- Albert Krebs (1899–1974), German Nazi Gauleiter
- Albert Henry Krehbiel (1873–1945), American painter
- Albert Kresch (1922–2022), American painter
- Albert Kretschmer (1825–1891), German professor, painter, costumes researcher, and businessman
- Albert Krieger (1923–2020), American criminal defense lawyer
- Albert Kriemler (born 1960), Swiss fashion designer and creative director
- Albert Kristjansson (1877–1974), Canadian legislator from Manitoba
- Albert Krivchenko (1935–2021), Russian politician, Governor of Amur Oblast, Russia (1991–1993)
- Albert Kruschel (1889–1959), American road racing cyclist
- Albert Christian Kruyt (1869–1949), Dutch Calvinist missionary, ethnographer, and theologian
- Albert Küchler (1803–1886), Danish painter
- Albert Kuchler (born 1998), German cross-country skier
- Albert Kudjabo (1896–1934), Congolese Belgian Army soldier
- Albert Kuhn (1860–1934), American pioneer and businessman
- Albert Kuntz (1896–1945), German goldsmith, soldier, communist, and Holocaust victim
- Albert Kūnuiākea (1851–1903), Hawaiian politician
- Albert Künzler (1911–1982), Swiss ice hockey goaltender
- Albert Kuqi (born 1992), Finnish footballer
- Albert Kurland (1914–2008), American psychiatrist and neuropsychopharmacologist
- Albert Kushlick (1932–1997), South African psychiatrist
- Albert Kusnets (1902–1942), Estonian wrestler
- Albert Kutal (1904–1976), Czech art historian
- Albert Kuvezin (born 1965), Tuvan guitarist
- Albert Kuvodu, Ghanaian actor and producer
- Albert Kuzilov (born 1985), Georgian weightlifter
- Albert Kwok (1921–1944), Malaysian resistance fighter
- Albert Laberge (1871–1960), Canadian author and journalist
- Albert Laboz, American real estate developer, landlord, and businessman
- Albert Lacombe (1827–1916), French-Canadian Roman Catholic missionary
- Albert Lacroix (1834–1903), Belgian publisher and printer
- Albert Ladenburg (1842–1911), German chemist
- Albert Laessle (1877–1954), American sculptor and educator
- Albert Lai, Hong Kong climate strategist and politician
- Albert Laing (1908–1962), New Zealand rugby league footballer
- Albert Laisant (1873–1928), French writer
- Albert Bond Lambert (1875–1946), American golfer and aviator
- Albert Edward Lambert (1869–1929), English architect
- Albert Lammens (1890–1933), Belgian tennis player
- Albert Lamorisse (1922–1970), French filmmaker, film producer, and screenwriter
- Albert Lamppu (1899–1976), Finnish javelin thrower
- Albert Lancaster (1849–1908), Belgian astronomer and meteorologist
- Albert Lance (1925–2013), Australian opera singer
- Albert Henry Landseer (1829–1906), Australian businessman and politician
- Albert Lane (1885–1948), English cricketer
- Albert Lane (1873–1950), Australian politician
- Albert Lane (1904–1982), Australian rugby league footballer known professionally as A.S. Lane
- Albert G. Lane (1841–1906), American educator
- Albert Langen (1869–1909), German publisher and publication founder
- Albert Langer, Australian political activist and electoral fraud convict
- Albert Langereis (1888–1966), Dutch sports shooter
- Albert Langford (1899–1965), English footballer
- Albert P. Langtry (1860–1939), American newspaper editor, publisher, and politician
- Albert P. Laning (1817–1880), American lawyer and politician
- Albert Lansdown (1897–1979), Australian cricketer
- Albert Lantonnois van Rode (1852–1934), Belgian Lieutenant General
- Albert Laponneraye (1808–1849), French socialist, journalist, historian, educator, and editor
- Albert Laprade (1883–1978), French architect
- Albert Larmour (born 1951), Northern Irish footballer
- Albert Larsen (1901–1985), Danish middle-distance runner
- Albert Lashbrooke (1883–1963), English cricketer
- Albert Lasker (1880–1952), American advertising executive and businessman
- Albert Latham (1904–1982), English footballer
- Albert George Latham (1864–1940), English professor
- Albert H. Latimer (c. 1800–1877), American Supreme Court justice from Texas
- Albert L. Latter (1921–1997), American nuclear physicist
- Albert G. Lauber (born 1950), American lawyer
- Albert Lauder (1898–1971), Australian rules footballer
- Albert Ernest Laurie (1866–1937), Scottish Episcopalian priest and soldier
- Albert Lautman (1908–1944), French mathematician and medical doctor
- Albert Lauzemis (1918–1944), German U-boat commander
- Albert Lavignac (1846–1916), French music scholar, music theorist, and composer
- Albert Lavigne (1908–1962), Canadian politician, businessman, and merchant
- Albert Law (1872–1956), British politician
- Albert G. Lawrence (1836–1887), American diplomat and soldier
- Albert Lawton (1879–1955), English cricketer
- Albert Le Bas (died 1972), Irish magician
- Albert Édouard Le Brethon de Caligny (1833–1863), French Navy officer
- Albert Le Grand (1599–1641), Breton hagiographer and preacher
- Albert Le Guillard (1887–1958), French composer and conductor
- Albert Alexander Cochrane Le Souef (1828–1902), Australian zoologist
- Albert Sherbourne Le Souef (1877–1951), Australian zoologist
- Albert Le Sueur (1849–1906), Jersey astronomer
- Albert Miller Lea (1808–1891), American military engineer
- Albert Leake (1930–1999), English footballer
- Albert Leatham (1859–1948), English cricketer
- Albert Leboucher (1888–1954), Tahitian businessman and politician
- Albert Lebourg (1849–1928), French painter
- Albert Lebrun (1871–1950), French politician, President of France from 1932 to 1940
- Albert C. Ledner (1924–2017), American architect
- Albert Leduc (1902–1990), Canadian ice hockey player
- Albert Lee (1910–1982), American Auditor General from Michigan from 1965 to 1982
- Albert Lee (born 1943), English guitarist
- Albert Lee (born 1962), Australian Paralympic volleyball player
- Albert Lee, Anglican bishop
- Albert G. Lee (1879–1967), British radio pioneer
- Albert Lindley Lee (1834–1907), American lawyer, United States Army and Union Army general, and Supreme Court judge from Kansas
- Albert Leese, English rugby league footballer
- Albert Leeson (1904–1946), English bow maker
- Albert Lefevre (1873–1928), American psychologist
- Albert Leffingwell (1845–1916), American physician, social reformer, and science advocate
- Albert Leffingwell (1895–1946), American advertising executive and novelist
- Albert LeGatt (born 1953), Canadian Roman Catholic Archbishop
- Albert Legault (1938–2022), Canadian academic and researcher
- Albert Legge (1903–1998), English footballer
- Albert Legogie (1947–2013), Nigerian senator from Edo North
- Albert Lehman, American lacrosse player
- Albert Lehmann, German socialist and politician
- Albert L. Lehninger (1917–1986), American biochemist
- Albert Leidmann (1908–1945), German boxer
- Albert Leman (1915–1998), Soviet composer
- Albert Lemaître (c. 1864–1906), French racing driver
- Albert Lemieux (1916–2003), Canadian attorney and businessman
- Albert Lenoir (1801–1891), French art historian, archaeologist, and writer
- Albert J. Lepore (1941–2010), American congressman from Rhode Island
- Albert Lerat, Belgian bobsledder
- Albert Lester (c. 1803–1867), American lawyer and congressman from New York
- Albert Letchford (1866–1905), English artist
- Albert Leung (born 1961), Hong Kong lyricist and writer
- Albert Levame (1881–1958), Monegasque Catholic prelate
- Albert Levan (1905–1998), Swedish botanist and geneticist
- Albert William Levi (1911–1988), American philosopher
- Albert J. Levis (born 1937), Greek psychiatrist and museum director
- Albert Levitt (1887–1968), American judge, law professor, Unitarian minister, attorney, and government official
- Albert Levy (1800–1848), Dutch-American physician
- Albert Lévy (1847–1931), French photographer
- Albert Levy Themans (1889–1959), Dutch bobsledder, businessman, and political activist
- Albert Lewin (1894–1968), American director, producer, and screenwriter
- Albert Lewis (1877–1956), English cricketer known professionally as Talbot Lewis
- Albert Lewis (1884–1978), Polish theatre and film producer
- Albert Lewis (c. 1884–unknown), English footballer
- Albert Lewis (1921–2008), Welsh Anglican priest
- Albert Lewis (born 1960), American football player
- Albert B. Lewis (1925–2021), American lawyer, accountant, and senator from New York
- Albert Buell Lewis (1867–1940), American anthropologist
- Albert Gerald Lewis (1918–1982), South African fighter pilot and fighter ace
- Albert L. Lewis (1917–2008), American rabbi, scholar, and author
- Albert Lexie (1942–2018), American shoe shiner and philanthropist
- Albert P. Li, Hong Kong-American biologist
- Albert J. Libchaber (born 1934), French mathematician, physicist, and professor
- Albert Libertad (1875–1908), French anarchist militant and writer
- Albert G. Lieske (1887–1979), American farmer and politician
- Albert Lieven (1906–1971), German actor
- Albert Lightfoot (1936–2023), English cricketer
- Albert Likhanov (1935–2021), Soviet-Russian writer and politician
- Albert Likuvalu (born 1943), French politician
- Albert Lilar (1900–1976), Belgian politician
- Albert Lilius (1873–1947), Finnish child psychologist and professor
- Albert Lim, Hong Kong opera singer
- Albert Lin (born 1981), American engineer, scientist, technologist, explorer, and television host
- Albert Lind (1878–1964), Australian politician
- Albert Lindegger (1904–1991), Swiss painter and illustrator
- Albert Lindemann, American historian
- Albert Linder (1877–unknown), Swiss footballer
- Albert Linder (1996–2021), Kazakh weightlifter
- Albert Lindhagen (1823–1887), Swedish city planner, lawyer, and politician
- Albert Lindon (1891–1976), English football player and manager
- Albert Lindqvist (1888–1961), Swedish tennis player
- Albert Lindsay (1881–1961), English football goalkeeper
- Albert J. Lingo (1910–1969), American segregationist and police chief
- Albert Paul Linnell (1922–2017), American astronomer and professor
- Albert Lippert (1901–1978), German actor
- Albert Lippmann, French tennis player
- Albert Lipscomb (born 1951), American senator from Alabama
- Albert Lisacek (1933–2012), Canadian policeman
- Albert Edward Litherland (born 1928), British nuclear physicist
- Albert Littlefield, American physician
- Albert Liurette (1904–unknown), Guinean physician and politician
- Albert Llovera (born 1966), Andorran rally driver and alpine skier
- Albert Locke (1898–unknown), English footballer and manager
- Albert Lockley (1873–1939), Welsh footballer
- Albert Loeak (died 1976), Marshallese politician
- Albert Henry Loeb (1868–1924), American attorney
- Albert Loibl (born 1937), German ice hockey player
- Albert Lomotey (born 1955), Ghanaian sprinter
- Albert Londe (1858–1917), French photographer, medical researcher, and chronophotographer
- Albert Londres (1884–1932), French journalist and writer
- Albert Long (1832–1901), American Methodist pastor
- Albert George Long (1915–1999), British educator and paleobotanist
- Albert Longdon (1865–1937), English cricketer
- Albert Longhurst (1876–1955), British archaeologist and art historian
- Albert Heber Longman (1880–1954), English-Australian newspaper publisher and museum director
- Albert Lord (1888–1969), English cricketer
- Albert Lord (1912–1991), American researcher, folklorist, poetry collector, and professor
- Albert Lortzing (1801–1851), German composer, librettist, actor, and singer
- Albert Lottin (born 2001), French footballer
- Albert Louppe (1856–1927), French explosives engineer and politician
- Albert L'Ouvrier (1815–1895), French socialist statesman of the French Second Republic
- Albert Love (1911–1943), Welsh boxer
- Albert J. Loveland (1893–1961), American Secretary of Agriculture from 1948 to 1950
- Albert Low (1928–2016), English-Canadian Zen master, author, and human resources executive
- Albert Peter Low (1861–1942), Canadian geologist, explorer, and ice hockey player
- Albert Lowagie (born 1929), Belgian sprinter
- Albert Lowerson (1896–1945), Australian Army soldier, recipient of the Victoria Cross
- Albert Löwy (1816–1908), Moravian-English Hebrew scholar and Reform rabbi
- Albert Lucas (1859–1923), English-American Jewish activist
- Albert Lucas (1899–1967), French hurdler
- Albert Lucas (born 1960), American juggler
- Albert Pike Lucas (1862–1945), American painter
- Albert Luce (1888–1962), American industrialist, entrepreneur, bus designer, and businessman
- Albert Luckenbach (1851–1939), American postmaster
- Albert Ludick (born 1939), South African boxer
- Albert Ludovici Sr. (1820–1894), German-British artist
- Albert Ludwig (1919–2019), Canadian Royal Canadian Air Force soldier, lawyer, judge, author, and legislator from Alberta
- Albert Lujan (1892–1948), Taos Pueblo painter
- Albert Lukmanov (born 1975), Russian footballer and coach
- Albert Lunn, English rugby league footballer
- Albert C.J. Luo (born 1964), American mechanical engineer and research professor
- Albert Luque (born 1978), Spanish footballer
- Albert Luthuli (1898–1967), South African teacher, politician, and anti-apartheid activist
- Albert Luykx (1917–1978), Belgian businessman
- Albert Lybrock (1827–1886), German-American architect
- Albert Howe Lybyer (1876–1949), American scholar and historian
- Albert R. Lyman (1880–1973), American writer and pioneer
- Albert Lynch (1860–1950), German-Peruvian painter
- Albert Edwin Lynch (1900–1976), Australian musician and Catholic priest
- Albert Brown Lyons (1841–1926), American chemist
- Albert Lysander (1875–1956), Swedish Lutheran priest
- Albert Lythgoe (1868–1934), American archaeologist and Egyptologist
- Albert Jan Maat (born 1953), Dutch politician
- Albert Dutton MacDade (1871–1954), American politician and district attorney
- Albert Frederick Macdonald (1901–1976), Canadian railway employee and politician
- Albert Reginald MacDougall (1902–1953), Canadian legislator from British Columbia
- Albert Mackey (1807–1881), American medical doctor and author
- Albert D. Mackey (died 1935), American politician and lawyer
- Albert Macklin (born 1958), American actor
- Albert Mächler (born 1950), Swiss biathlete
- Albert Macovski (born 1929), American professor
- Albert MacQuarrie (1882–1950), American silent film actor
- Albert Madansky (1934–2022), American statistician
- Albert Madörin (1905–1960), Swiss bobsledder
- Albert Maes (1906–1986), Belgian weightlifter
- Albert H. Maggs (1916–1994), Australian bookmaker and philanthropist
- Albert Magilton (1826–1875), American United States Army colonel
- Albert Magnin (1846–1906), American congressman from Pennsylvania
- Albert Magnoli (born c. 1954), American film director, screenwriter, and editor
- Albert Mahieu (1860–1926), French politician
- Albert Mahomet (1858–unknown), English photographer, teacher, and Methodist preacher
- Albert Maier (1860–1944), German Christadelphian
- Albert Maige (1872–1943), French botanist
- Albert Maignan (1845–1908), French painter and illustrator
- Albert Makashov (born 1938), Russian officer and politician
- Albert Makiadi (born 1997), French footballer
- Albert Malam (1913–1992), English footballer
- Albert Malbert (1914–1972), French actor
- Albert Malbois (1915–2017), French prelate
- Albert Malet (1864–1915), French historian and textbook writer
- Albert Malet (1905–1986), French painter
- Albert Mallalieu (1904–1991), English cricketer
- Albert Mallinson (1870–1946), British organist and composer
- Albert Mallory (1848–1904), Canadian physician and political figure
- Albert Hay Malotte (1895–1964), American pianist, organist, composer, and educator
- Albert Malouin (1857–1936), Canadian lawyer, politician, and Supreme Court justice from Quebec
- Albert Maltz (1908–1985), American playwright, writer, and screenwriter
- Albert Mamary (1932–2011), American school superintendent, educational consultant, and author
- Albert Mancini (1899–1987), American musician and composer
- Albert Mandelbaum (1925–unknown), Israeli chess master
- Albert Mandler (1929–1973), Israeli major general
- Albert Mando (1846–1912), American composer, conductor, and educator
- Albert Manent (1930–2014), Catalan writer and cultural activist
- Albert Mangan (1915–1993), American racewalker
- Albert Mangelsdorff (1928–2005), German jazz trombonist
- Albert Manger (1899–1985), American weightlifter
- Albert Mangonès (1917–2002), Haitian architect
- Albert Mangwea (1982–2013), Tanzanian hip hop artist
- Albert Manifold (born 1962), Irish businessman
- Albert V. Maniscalco (1908–1998), American congressman from New York
- Albert Manliguis (born 1930), American basketball coach
- Albert Mannheimer (1913–1972), American screenwriter
- Albert Mansbridge (1876–1952), English educator
- Albert Mansour (born 1939), Lebanese politician
- Albert Manteca (born 1988), Spanish footballer
- Albert Manthe (1847–1929), German sculptor
- Albert Manucy (1910–1997), American author, historian, and scholar
- Albert Maori Kiki (1931–1993), Papua New Guinean politician
- Albert Marcet (born 1960), Spanish economist
- Albert Gallatin Marchand (1811–1848), American congressman from Pennsylvania
- Albert Marchinsky (1875–1930), Polish magician
- Albert Marco (1887–unknown), Italian bootlegger
- Albert Marcœur (born 1947), French composer, singer, and songwriter
- Albert Marden (born 1934), American mathematician
- Albert Marenčin (1922–2019), Slovak writer, poet, surrealist, essayist, screenwriter, editor, collage artist, translator, and critic
- Albert Margai (1910–1980), Sierra Leonean politician, Prime Minister of Sierra Leone from 1964 to 1967
- Albert Margai (born 1987), English basketball player
- Albert Marie (born 1957), Seychellois long-distance runner
- Albert Hastings Markham (1841–1918), British explorer, author, and Royal Navy officer
- Albert Markov (born 1933), Russian-American violinist, composer, conductor, and pedagogue
- Albert A. Marks Jr., American businessman
- Albert S. Marks (1836–1891), American attorney, soldier, and politician, Governor of Tennessee from 1879 to 1881
- Albert Branson Maris (1893–1989), American judge
- Albert Marque (1872–1939), French sculptor and doll maker
- Albert Marquet (1875–1947), French painter
- Albert Nelson Marquis (1855–1943), American publisher
- Albert Marrama (born 1983), Spanish football goalkeeper
- Albert Marre (1924–2012), American stage director and producer
- Albert Marrin (born 1936), American historian, professor, and author
- Albert Marsden (1887–1971), Australian cricketer
- Albert Marsh (1831–1895), American United States Army sergeant and recipient of the Medal of Honor
- Albert L. Marsh (1877–1944), American metallurgist
- Albert Marshall (1897–2005), British Army soldier and recipient of the Legion of Honour
- Albert Marshall (1909–1968), American football coach
- Albert Marshall (born 1947), Maltese-Australian senior leader, board member, executive producer, lecturer, theater and television director, television presenter, and author
- Albert L. Marshall, American football player and coach known professionally as A. L. Marshall
- Albert P. Marshall (1914–2001), American librarian and educator known professionally as A. P. Marshall
- Albert W. Marshall (1874–1958), American United States Navy rear admiral
- Albert Marteaux (1886–1949), Belgian physician, politician, and resistance leader
- Albert E. Martel, American government official and police officer
- Albert Marth (1828–1897), German astronomer
- Albert Martin (1808–1836), Texian merchant and Texas Army captain
- Albert Martin, Scottish sailor
- Albert C. Martin Sr. (1879–1960), American architect and engineer
- Albert C. Martin Jr. (1913–2006), American architect
- Albert Edward Martin (1876–1936), English merchant and politician
- Albert N. Martin (born 1934), American Reformed Baptist minister
- Albert Martinez (c. 1888–1940), Taos Pueblo painter, known professionally as Albert Looking Elk
- Albert Martinez (born 1963), Filipino actor, producer, and director
- Albert Masland (born 1956), American congressman from Pennsylvania
- Albert Abraham Mason (1926–2018), English anesthesiologist
- Albert L. Mason (1824–1896), American congressman from Wisconsin
- Albert Massard (1900–1968), Luxembourgish footballer
- Albert Kiplagat Matebor (born 1980), Kenyan long-distance runner
- Albert Mathiez (1874–1932), French historian
- Albert Matignon (1860–1937), French painter
- Albert E. Matt (1864–1941), British musician, composer, and trombone player
- Albert Matterstock (1911–1960), German actor
- Albert Matthews (born 1944), Scottish cricketer
- Albert Edward Matthews (1873–1949), Canadian politician, Lieutenant Governor of Ontario from 1937 to 1946
- Albert Mauer (1907–1999), Polish ice hockey player
- Albert Mayaud (1899–1987), French water polo player and swimmer
- Albert Mayer (1892–1914), German Imperial German Army soldier
- Albert Mayer (1897–1981), American planner and architect
- Albert Mayer (born 1943), French sprint canoeist
- Albert Mayr (born 1943), Italian composer
- Albert Mays (1929–1973), Welsh footballer
- Albert Maysles (1926–2015), American documentarian, part of a duo
- Albert Mazibuko (born 1948), South African singer
- Albert Mbano (born 1969), Zimbabwean footballer
- Albert McAndrew (1920–2009), Australian rugby league player
- Albert Chase McArthur (1881–1951), American architect
- Albert McCann (1941–2014), English footballer
- Albert McCarthy (1920–1987), English jazz and blues discographer, critic, historian, and editor
- Albert McCay (1901–1969), American congressman from New Jersey
- Albert McCleery (1911–1972), American television producer
- Albert McClellan (born 1986), American football player
- Albert Joseph McConnell (1903–1993), Irish mathematician and mathematical physicist
- Albert McDonald (1930–2014), American congressman from Alabama
- Albert McElroy (1915–1975), Scottish-Irish minister and politician
- Albert H. McGeehan (born 1944), American politician, Mayor of Holland, Michigan from 1993 to 2009
- Albert McGinn (1913–2006), Australian cricketer
- Albert McGregor (1870–1948), Canadian legislator from Manitoba
- Albert McGuinness, Australian rugby league footballer
- Albert McInroy (1901–1985), English football goalkeeper
- Albert McIntire (1853–1935), American politician, Governor of Colorado from 1895 to 1897
- Albert Thongchai McIntyre (born 1958), Thai singer and actor
- Albert Edward McKenzie (1898–1918), English Royal Navy soldier and Victoria Cross recipient
- Albert McKnight (1927–2016), American author, activist, Black Catholic priest, and religious advocate
- Albert McLeland, American college football and basketball coach
- Albert S. McLemore (1869–1921), American United States Marine Corps officer
- Albert J. McNeil (1920–2022), American choral conductor, ethnomusicologist, and author
- Albert McPherson (1927–2015), English footballer
- Albert McPhillips (1904–1971), Canadian politician from British Columbia
- Albert Edward McPhillips (1861–1938), Canadian politician and barrister from British Columbia
- Albert McQuarrie (1918–2016), British politician
- Albert E. Mead (1861–1913), American lawyer and politician from Washington
- Albert R. Mead (1915–2009), American malacologist
- Albert Means (born 1982), American football player
- Albert Mechelynck (1854–1924), Belgian politician
- Albert Medwin (1925–2020), American electrical engineer
- Albert Stewart Meek (1871–1943), English bird collector and naturalist
- Albert Meems (1888–1950s), Dutch German spy
- Albert Mehrabian (born 1939), American psychologist and professor
- Albert Meier, Swiss footballer
- Albert Meijeringh (1645–1714), Dutch painter
- Albert Mellin (1843–1886), Finnish architect
- Albert Meltzer (1920–1996), English anarcho-communist activist and writer
- Albert Memmi (1920–2020), French-Tunisian writer and essayist
- Albert Menduni (born 1945), French boxer
- Albert Mengue (born 1999), Cameroonian boxer
- Albert W. Merck (1920–2014), American politician and philanthropist
- Albert Merlin (1931–2015), French economist
- Albert Mertz (1920–1990), Danish painter
- Albert Merz (died 1941), German Christadelphian
- Albert Meserlin (1920–2009), American photographer
- Albert Messiah (1921–2013), French physicist
- Albert Methfessel (1785–1869), German composer, singer, musicologist, and conductor
- Albert Métin (1871–1918), French teacher, professor, author, and politician
- Albert Edward Mettam (1867–1917), Irish scholar
- Albert Meyer (1870–1953), Swiss politician and editor
- Albert Meyer, Swiss football goalkeeper
- Albert Gregory Meyer (1903–1965), American Roman Catholic prelate
- Albert J. Meyer (1919–1983), American economist
- Albert J. Meyer, American forensic accountant and investor
- Albert R. Meyer (born 1941), American computer scientist and professor
- Albert Meyers (1932–2007), American organic chemist and professor
- Albert Meyong (born 1980), Cameroonian footballer and manager
- Albert Meysey-Thompson (1848–1894), English barrister and footballer
- Albert Mezergues (1886–1925), French flying ace
- Albert Micallef (born 1958), Maltese cyclist
- Albert Michant, Belgian water polo player
- Albert Michel (1909–1981), French actor
- Albert Michelet (1869–1928), French sailor
- Albert Michelsen (1893–1964), American long-distance runner
- Albert A. Michelson (1852–1931), Polish-American physicist
- Albert Michiels (1931–1998), Belgian wrestler
- Albert Michiels (born 1939), Belgian footballer
- Albert Michotte (1881–1965), Belgian psychologist
- Albert Midlane (1825–1909), British poet
- Albert Mikhaylov (born 2002), Belarusian footballer
- Albert Miles (1903–unknown), Welsh footballer
- Albert Miles (1912–2008), British academic dentist
- Albert Millaire (1935–2018), Canadian actor and theatre director
- Albert Millard (1868–unknown), English footballer
- Albert Millaud (1844–1892), French journalist, writer, and author
- Albert Miller (born 1957), Fijian decathlete
- Albert C. Miller (1898–1979), American attorney, Attorney General of South Dakota (1961–1963) and Lieutenant Governor of South Dakota (1941–1945)
- Albert Millet (1929–2007), French serial killer
- Albert E. Milloy (1921–2012), American U.S. Army officer
- Albert Leopold Mills (1854–1916), American United States Army major general
- Albert Milton (1885–1917), English footballer
- Albert Minczér (born 1986), Hungarian steeplechase runner
- Albert Miralles (born 1982), Spanish basketball player
- Albert Miravent (born 1994), Spanish footballer
- Albert Mitchell, American soccer player
- Albert Mkrtchyan (1937–2018), Armenian film director, screenwriter, and actor
- Albert Mnatsakanyan (born 1999), Armenian-Russian footballer
- Albert Mncwango (born 1953), South African politician
- Albert Mobilio, American poet and critic
- Albert Moché (1885–1977), French long-distance runner
- Albert Mockel (1866–1945), Belgian poet
- Albert Modley (1901–1979), English entertainer and comedian
- Albert Moeschinger (1897–1985), Swiss composer
- Albert Theodor Alexius Moeskau (1864–1929), Norwegian laborer and politician
- Albert Mohler (born 1959), American theologian and podcast host
- Albert Mohler, Swiss footballer
- Albert Henrik Mohn (1918–1999), Norwegian journalist and correspondent
- Albert Mohr (1929–2005), West German cross-country skier
- Albert Richard Mohr (1911–1992), German musicologist
- Albert Mokeyev (1936–1969), Soviet pentathlete
- Albert Mol (1917–2004), Dutch author, actor, and television personality
- Albert Moll (1862–1939), German neurologist, psychologist, sexologist, and ethicist
- Albert Moll, Canadian psychiatrist
- Albert Mollegen (1906–1984), American Christianity apologist
- Albert Szenczi Molnár (1574–1634), Hungarian Calvinist pastor, linguist, philosopher, poet, religious writer, and translator
- Albert Mondet (1898–unknown), Swiss water polo player
- Albert Mongita (1916–1985), Congolese actor, dramatist, painter, filmmaker, and theatre director
- Albert Monk (1900–1975), Australian trade unionist
- Albert Monks (1875–1936), English footballer
- Albert Monks (1903–1937), English football goalkeeper
- Albert Monnier (1815–1869), French author, poet, biographer, and playwright
- Albert Montañés (born 1980), Spanish tennis player
- Albert Monteys (born 1971), Spanish comic writer and illustrator
- Albert Moore (1862–1916), American United States Marine Corps private and Medal of Honor recipient
- Albert Moore (1863–unknown), English footballer
- Albert Moore (1898–unknown), English footballer
- Albert Joseph Moore (1841–1893), English painter
- Albert Mooren (1828–1899), German ophthalmologist
- Albert Morales (born 1991), American mixed martial artist
- Albert P. Morano (1908–1987), American congressman from Connecticut
- Albert Hodges Morehead (1909–1966), American newspaper writer, bridge player, lexicographer, author, and editor
- Albert P. Morehouse (1835–1891), American politician and Governor of Missouri from 1887 to 1889
- Albert Morel (1870–1949), Canadian ice hockey goaltender
- Albert T. Morgan (1842–1922), American farmer and congressman from Mississippi
- Albert Andreas Mørkved (1898–1990), Norwegian lawyer, judge, and politician
- Albert Morris (1886–1939), Australian botanist, landscaper, ecologist, and conservationist
- Albert Morrow (1863–1927), Irish illustrator, poster designer, and cartoonist
- Albert Morrow (1883–1969), Irish businessman and politician
- Albert Pitts Morse (1863–1936), American entomologist
- Albert Clifford Morson (1881–1975), English surgeon and urologist
- Albert Moses (1937–2017), Sri Lankan actor
- Albert Moss (1863–1945), English cricketer
- Albert Moss (1969–2001), American DJ known professionally as DJ Uncle Al
- Albert Mosse (1846–1925), German judge and legal scholar
- Albert Moukheiber (1912–2002), Lebanese doctor and politician
- Albert Mountain (1897–1967), English British Army Sergeant and Victoria Cross recipient
- Albert W. Moursund III (1919–2002), American lawyer and politician
- Albert Wadel Hansen Moursund (1845–1927), American judge and politician
- Albert Mousson (1805–1890), Swiss physicist and malacologist
- Albert Mouton, Namibian politician
- Albert Henry Mowbray (1881–1949), American economist
- Albert Msando (born 1979), Tanzanian lawyer and politician
- Albert Muchnik (1934–2019), Russian mathematician
- Albert Mugnier (1903–1974), French bobsledder
- Albert Muis (1914–1988), Dutch artist
- Albert Mulder (1889–1987), Dutch painter
- Albert Mullard (1920–1984), English footballer
- Albert Müller (1897–1926), Swiss painter, glass artist, draftsman, graphic artist, and sculptor
- Albert Mullett (1933–2014), Australian spokesperson
- Albert A. Mullin (1933–2017), American engineer and mathematician
- Albert Mumford (1865–1926), English footballer
- Albert G. Mumma (1906–1997), American Navy rear admiral
- Albert F. Mummery (1855–1895), English mountaineer and author
- Albert Edward Munn (1865–1946), Canadian businessman and politician
- Albert Mundy (1926–1999), English footballer
- Albert Henry Munsell (1858–1918), American painter, art teacher, and inventor
- Albert Murasira (born 1962), Rwandan politician
- Albert A. Murphree (1870–1927), American college professor and university president
- Albert Murray (1887–1974), English-Canadian golfer
- Albert Murray (1906–1992), American naval combat artist
- Albert Murray (1916–2013), American literary and music critic, novelist, essayist, and biographer
- Albert Murray (1930–1980), British politician
- Albert Frederick Mutti (born 1938), American bishop
- Albert Muwalo (1927–1977), Malawian politician
- Albert Muylle (1910–unknown), Belgian cyclist
- Albert J. Myer (1828–1880), American United States Army general and surgeon
- Albert L. Myer (1846–1914), American United States Army soldier, interim Mayor of Ponce, Puerto Rico in 1899
- Albert L. Myerson (1919–2004), American chemist

==== N–Z ====
- Albert Nabonibo (born 1983/1984), Rwandan gospel singer
- Albert Nađ (born 1974), Serbian footballer and manager
- Albert Nalchajyan (born 1939), Armenian psychologist
- Albert Namatjira (1902–1959), Australian painter
- Albert Napier (1881–1973), British civil servant
- Albert Narath (1864–1924), Austrian surgeon and anatomist
- Albert Narath (1933–2023), German chemist
- Albert C. Nash (1825–1890), American architect
- Albert L. Nash (1921–2015), American businessman and congressman from Massachusetts
- Albert Nasibulin (born 1972), Russian material scientist and chemist
- Albert Nasse (1878–1910), American rower
- Albert Naughton (1929–2013), English rugby league footballer
- Albert Naumann (1875–1952), German fencer
- Albert Ndele (1930–2023), Congolese politician and banker
- Albert Abdoulaye N'Diaye, Senegalese politician
- Albert Ndongmo (1926–1992), Cameroonian Roman Catholic bishop
- Albert Henry Near (1897–1951), American United States Air Force officer
- Albert Negahnquet (1874–1944), American Indian Catholic priest
- Albert Ludwig Sigesmund Neisser (1855–1916), German physician
- Albert "Red" Nelson (1886–1956), American major league baseball pitcher
- Albert Nelson (1890–1957), British peer
- Albert Nelson, American actor
- Albert H. Nelson (1812–1858), American jurist and Superior Court chief justice from Massachusetts
- Albert Nemethy (1920–1998), Hungarian-American artist
- Albert Nerenberg (born 1962), Canadian filmmaker, actor, journalist, and hypnotist
- Albert J. Neri (1952–2011), American political news correspondent, pundit, and political analyst
- Albert Neuberger (1908–1996), British academic and scientist
- Albert Neuhuys (1844–1914), Dutch artist
- Albert Neumann (1899–1976), Luxembourgish gymnast
- Albert Ernest Newbury (1891–1941), Australian artist
- Albert A. Newman (1843–1933), American businessman, merchant, and banker
- Albert Newsam (1809–1864), American lithographer and painter
- Albert R. Newsome (1894–1951), American author, editor, educator, and historian
- Albert Newton (1894–1975), English footballer
- Albert Newton (c. 1910–1989), Australian lawn bowler
- Albert "Bert" Newton (1938–2021), Australian media personality and presenter
- Albert Kai-Wing Ng (born 1950), Canadian graphic designer
- Albert Parker Niblack (1859–1929), American United States Navy admiral
- Albert Nibte (born 1993), Surinamese footballer
- Albert Nicholas (1900–1973), American jazz clarinetist
- Albert Nicholas (1931–2016), American businessman
- Albert (Peto) Nicholas (1951–2012), Cook Islands politician
- Albert Nicholas (born 1971), Cook Islands politician
- Albert Russell Nichols (1859–1933), English museum curator and zoologist
- Albert S. Nicholson (1829–1893), American religious leader, civic leader, and educator
- Albert Nickerson (1911–1994), American business executive
- Albert W. Nickerson (1840–1893), American railroad executive
- Albert Nico, Filipino-Malaysian hairstylist
- Albert Niemann (1831–1917), German opera singer
- Albert Niemann (1834–1861), German chemist
- Albert Niemann (1880–1921), German physicist
- Albert Nightingale (1923–2006), English footballer
- Albert Nijenhuis (1926–2015), Dutch-American mathematician
- Albert Nikolayevitch Benois (1852–1936), Russian painter and art teacher
- Albert Nikoro (born 1992), New Zealand-Samoan rugby union player
- Albert Nipon (1927–2022), American fashion designer and clothing manufacturer
- Albert G. Noble (1895–1980), American Navy admiral
- Albert Jay Nock (1870–1945), American author, editor, educational theorist, Georgist, and social critic
- Albert Nofi (born 1944), American military historian, defense analyst, and computer designer
- Albert Nolan (1934–2022), South African Catholic priest and theologian writer
- Albert Norak (1928–2015), Estonian Communist politician, swimmer, financier, and civil servant
- Albert Norden (1904–1982), German Communist politician
- Albert Nordengen (1923–2004), Norwegian banker and politician
- Albert Norman (1882–1964), British pathologist
- Albert North (1877–1933), English cricketer
- Albert Norton (1836–1914), Australian politician and pastoralist
- Albert D. Nortoni (1867–1938), American politician, judge, and lawyer from Missouri
- Albert Nozaki (1912–2003), Japanese-American art director
- Albert Ntabaliba, Tanzanian politician
- Albert F. Nufer (1894–1956), American diplomat
- Albert Nürnberger (1854–1931), German bow maker
- Albert Nuss (1907–1969), Luxembourgish boxer* Albert Frederick Nussbaum (1934–1996), American murderer and bank robber
- Albert Nutter (1913–1996), English cricketer
- Albert Nyathi (born 1962), Zimbabwean poet, musician, writer, actor, and philanthropist
- Albert Nyembo (born 1929), Congolese-Katangese politician
- Albert Nyman (1872–1924), Finnish diver
- Albert Nzula (1905–1934), South African politician and activist
- Albert Kwaku Obbin (born 1956), Ghanaian politician
- Albert Öberg (1888–1990), Swedish runner
- Albert Obiefuna (1930–2011), Roman Catholic archbishop
- Albert Oblinger (1910–unknown), Austrian racing cyclist
- Albert O'Connor (1843–1928), American Union Army and United States Army sergeant
- Albert Kwesi Ocran (1929–2019), Ghanaian Army soldier and politician
- Albert Odulele (born 1964), Nigerian-British pastor, author, and evangelist
- Albert Oehlen (born 1954), German artist
- Albert Oganezov (1949–2002), Russian handball player
- Albert Ogilvie (1890–1939), Australian politician
- Albert Oguzov (born 1991), Russian judoka
- Albert Öijermark (1900–1970), Swedish footballer
- Albert Okonkwo, Nigerian military administrator
- Albert Okura (1951–2023), American businessman
- Albert Okwuegbunam (born 1998), American football player
- Albert Oldman (1883–1961), English super heavyweight boxer
- Albert Oliver (born 1978), Spanish basketball player
- Albert Ollivier (1915–1964), French historian, author, journalist, and politician
- Albert T. Olmstead (1880–1945), American historian and academic
- Albert H. Olpin (1870–1923), American Mormon missionary
- Albert Olsson (1896–1977), Swedish footballer
- Albert Olsson (1904–1994), Swedish writer and teacher
- Albert Julius Olsson (1864–1942), British maritime artist and yachtsman
- Albert Olszewski (born 1962), American orthopedic surgeon and congressman from Montana
- Albert Olszewski Von Herbulis (1861–1928), American architect
- Albert Ondo Ossa, Gabonese politician
- Albert Kwame Onwona- Agyeman, Ghanaian politician
- Albert Onyeawuna (died 2014), Nigerian footballer
- Albert Onyembo Lomandjo (1931–2016), Congolese Roman Catholic bishop
- Albert Opoku (1915–2002), Ghanaian choreographer, dancer, printmaker, painter, and educator
- Albert Oppel (1831–1865), German paleontologist
- Albert Oram (1913–1999), English politician
- Albert Orme (1937–2008), New Zealand rugby player, lawyer, and politician
- Albert Orr (born 1953), Australian entomologist
- Albert Orsborn (1886–1967), English Salvation Army general
- Albert Ortega (born 1998), Spanish alpine ski racer
- Albert L. Osborn (1858–1940), American congressman from Wisconsin
- Albert S. Osborn (1855–1946), American forensic scientist
- Albert Óskarsson (born 1968), Icelandic basketball player
- Albert Oskolkov (born 1973), Russian footballer
- Albert Oss (1818–1898), American Union Army soldier and Medal of Honor recipient
- Albert Osswald (1919–1996), German politician
- Albert Ostman (c. 1893–1975), Canadian prospector
- Albert H. Oswald (1879–1929), English composer and organist
- Albert M. Ottenheimer (1904–1980), American stage actor
- Albert Henry Ottenweller (1916–2012), American prelate
- Albert Ottinger (1878–1938), American lawyer, congressman, and Attorney General from New York
- Albert Julius Otto Penzig (1856–1929), German mycologist
- Albert Ouédraogo (born 1969), Burkinabé economist and interim Prime Minister of Burkina Faso in 2022
- Albert Oustric (1887–1971), French entrepreneur and banker
- Albert Outler (1908–1989), American Methodist historian, theologian, and pastor
- Albert Ouzoulias (1915–1995), French politician and Communist leader
- Albert Overhauser (1925–2011), American physicist
- Albert Overton (1903–1988), American major league baseball pitcher
- Albert Ovsepyan (born 1938), Armenian-Abkhazian politician
- Albert Owen (born 1959), Welsh politician
- Albert Alan Owen (born 1948), British composer and musician
- Albert Owens, American major league baseball pitcher
- Albert H. Owens Jr. (1926–2017), American cancer researcher
- Albert Oxley (1915–1994), English footballer
- Albert Pacifico, American cardiac surgeon
- Albert Pahimi Padacké (born 1966), Chadian politician and Prime Minister of Chad from 2016 to 2018 and 2021–2022
- Albert Padmore (born 1944), West Indies cricketer
- Albert Pagara (born 1994), Filipino super bantamweight boxer
- Albert Page (1916–1995), English footballer
- Albert Paine (1861–1937), American author and biographer
- Albert Pakeyev (born 1968), Russian boxer
- Albert Paley (born 1944), American modernist and metal sculptor
- Albert Palle (1916–2007), French writer
- Albert Palmer (1831–1887), American schoolteacher, businessman, politician, and mayor of Boston, Massachusetts from 1883 to 1884
- Albert Palmer (1859–1919), Australian politician
- Albert Palmer, Canadian trader and politician
- Albert Marshman Palmer (1838–1905), American theatrical manager, known professionally as A. M. Palmer
- Albert Pannam (1882–1968), Australian rules footballer
- Albert Pape (1897–1955), English footballer
- Albert Papilaya (1967–2021), Indonesian middleweight boxer
- Albert Parker (1843–1905), British peer and politician
- Albert Parker (1885–1974), American film director, producer, screenwriter, and actor
- Albert Parker (1916–1995), American businessman
- Albert Parker (1927–2005), English footballer
- Albert Lindsay Parkinson (1870–1936), British businessman and politician
- Albert Eide Parr (1900–1991), American marine biologist, zoologist, and oceanographer
- Albert Parry (1874–1950), Welsh clergyman
- Albert Parry (1901–1992), Russian academic and historian
- Albert Parsells (1918–1954), American polo player
- Albert Parsis (1890–1980), French footballer
- Albert Parsons (1848–1887), American newspaper editor, orator, and labor activist
- Albert Parsons (1869–1948), Canadian merchant and politician
- Albert Partridge (1901–unknown), English footballer
- Albert T. Patrick (1866–1940), American lawyer
- Albert Patron (born 1969), Italian composer, music theorist, writer, philosopher, and artist
- Albert Pattengill (1842–1906), American professor
- Albert Patterson (1894–1954), American politician and attorney
- Albert Paulig (1873–1933), German silent film actor
- Albert Paulsen (1925–2004), Ecuadorian-American actor
- Albert Pauphilet (1884–1948), French professor and medievalist
- Albert Payne (cricketer) (1885–1908), English cricketer
- Albert Henry Payne (1812–1902), English steel engraver, painter, and illustrator
- Albert Payton (1898–1967), English cricketer
- Albert Lister Peace (1844–1912), British organist, arranger, composer, editor, and author
- Albert Charles Peale (1849–1914), American geologist, mineralogist, and paleobotanist
- Albert Pearce, American congressman from Vermont
- Albert Pearson (1892–1975), English footballer
- Albert H. Pearson (1920–1963), American farmer and congressman from Illinois
- Albert J. Pearson (1846–1905), American soldier, attorney, judge, and congressman from Ohio
- Albert Peatfield (1874–1953), English cricketer
- Albert Pechan (1902–1969), American senator from Pennsylvania
- Albert Pel (1849–1924), French serial killer
- Albert Pell (1820–1907), English solicitor and politician
- Albert Pelling (1903–1977), British fencer
- Albert Pen (1931–2003), Canadian politician
- Albert Pendarvis, American Christian radio broadcaster
- Albert G. Pendleton (1809–1875), American politician
- Albert Joseph Pénot (1862–1930), French painter
- Albert Pepperell (1922–1986), English rugby league footballer
- Albert Auguste Perdonnet (1801–1867), French railroad engineer
- Albert Perera (died 1965), Sri Lankan bantamweight boxer
- Albert Peries (1905–1967), Speaker of the Parliament of Sri Lanka from 1951 to 1956
- Albert Perikel (1913–1989), Belgian racing cyclist
- Albert Perkins (1833–1896), American educator and university administrator
- Albert Pessler (1590–1629), Austrian provost
- Albert Johan Petersson (1870–1914), Swedish chemist, engineer, and industrialist
- Albert Pettersson (1885–1960), Swedish weightlifter
- Albert Pettit (1930–1997), American congressman from Pennsylvania
- Albert Peyronnet (1862–1958), French politician
- Albert Pfluger (1907–1993), Swiss mathematician
- Albert Phelan (1945–2016), English footballer
- Albert Philippot (1899–1974), Belgian painter and art restorer
- Albert Philipsen (born 2006), Danish cyclist
- Albert L. Phillips (1824–1893), American congressman from Wisconsin
- Albert Philpott (1873–1950), Australian cricketer
- Albert Piaget (born 1928), Swiss field hockey player
- Albert Pick (1922–2015), German numismatist
- Albert J. Pickett (1810–1858), American planter, lawyer, and historian
- Albert Pickles (1877–1958), English footballer and manager
- Albert Pickles (1905–unknown), English footballer
- Albert Piddington (1862–1945), Australian lawyer, politician, and judge
- Albert Pieczonka (1828–1912), German-American composer, pianist, and music instructor
- Albert Pierrepoint (1905–1992), English hangman
- Albert H. Pierson (1839–1918), American farmer, teacher, and congressman from New York
- Albert Pietersma (born 1935), Dutch professor
- Albert Piette (born 1960), French anthropologist and professor
- Albert Pighius (1490–1542), Dutch Roman Catholic theologian, mathematician, and astronomer
- Albert Pike (1809–1891), American author, poet, orator, editor, lawyer, jurist, and Confederate States Army general
- Albert Pilát (1903–1974), Czech botanist and mycologist
- Albert Pillans (1869–1901), Anglo-Ceylonese cricketer
- Albert E. Pillsbury (1849–1930), American lawyer, congressman, and attorney general from Massachusetts
- Albert Pimblett (1919–2001), English rugby league footballer
- Albert Pinhasov (born 1972), Israeli academic
- Albert Pinkus (1903–1984), American chess master and writer
- Albert Pintat (born 1943), Andorran politician, prime minister of Andorra from 2005 to 2009
- Albert Pinxton (1912–1992), English footballer
- Albert P. Pisano (born 1954), American academic
- Albert Pissis (1852–1914), Mexican-American architect
- Albert J. Pitman (1887–1966), Welsh composer
- Albert Pitres (1848–1928), French neurological physician
- Albert Pitt (1842–1906), New Zealand politician and cabinet minister
- Albert Pitt (1880–unknown), English footballer
- Albert Planasdemunt i Gubert (1929–2021), Spanish politician
- Albert Planchon (1905–1989), French sports shooter
- Albert Planta (1868–1952), Canadian senator and financial agent
- Albert Platts (1883–1969), English footballer
- Albert Plécy (1914–1977), French journalist, painter, photographer, and filmmaker
- Albert Plesman (1889–1953), Dutch aviation pioneer
- Albert Plotkin (1920–2010), Jewish rabbi
- Albert Plummer (1840–1912), American physician and congressman from Minnesota
- Albert Pobor (1956–2022), Croatian football manager
- Albert Podell (1937–2023), American magazine editor and writer, advertising executive, trial attorney, and documentary producer and director
- Albert Poffenberger (1885–1977), American psychologist
- Albert Poggio (born 1945), Gibraltarian businessman and political consultant
- Albert Pohlman (c. 1868–unknown), American politician, mayor of South Norwalk, Connecticut from 1910 to 1911
- Albert Poisson (1868–1893), French author and alchemist
- Albert Polge (1909–unknown), French footballer
- Albert Poli (1945–2008), Italian footballer
- Albert F. Polk (1869–1955), American lawyer and congressman from Delaware
- Albert Pollard (1869–1948), British historian
- Albert C. Pollard (born 1967), American congressman from Virginia
- Albert Polman (born 1961), Dutch physicist and laboratory director
- Albert Pommer (1886–1946), German film producer
- Albert Pommier (1880–1943), French sculptor
- Albert Pomortsev (born 1939), Russian bandy executive
- Albert Pontremoli (1862–1923), French art collector, lawyer, and magistrate
- Albert Poon (born 1936), Hong Kong racing driver
- Albert Popa (born 1999), Romanian football goalkeeper
- Albert Augustus Pope (1843–1909), American Union Army Brevet Lieutenant-Colonel
- Albert Popov (born 1997), Bulgarian alpine skier
- Albert Popper (1808–1889), Czech doctor and politician
- Albert Popwell (1926–1999), American actor
- Albert Portas (born 1973), Spanish tennis player
- Albert Porte (1906–1986), Liberian political journalist
- Albert Porter (1864–1937), English cricketer and clergyman
- Albert G. Porter (1824–1897), American politician, Governor of Indiana from 1881 to 1885
- Albert S. Porter (1904–1979), American engineer and politician
- Albert Portevin (1880–1962), French metallurgist
- Albert B. Poston (1855–1902), American teacher, principal, preacher, and congressman from Mississippi
- Albert A. Pothier (1862–1931), Canadian politician from Nova Scotia
- Albert Potter (1897–1942), English footballer
- Albert Poulain (1851–1937), French chocolatier and industrialist
- Albert Pound (1831–1913), American businessman and politician
- Albert Powell (1873–1948), South African cricketer and rugby union footballer
- Albert Powell (1893–1979), English cricketer
- Albert Powell (1908–1940), Welsh footballer
- Albert Power (1870–1948), Irish Roman Catholic Jesuit priest, academic, and author
- Albert Power (1881–1945), Irish sculptor
- Albert E. Powers (1816–1910), American academic administrator
- Albert Theodore Powers (born 1953), American lawyer, business executive, and investor
- Albert Powys (1881–1936), English architect
- Albert Prago (1911–1993), American historian
- Albert Pratt (1893–1916), New Zealand cricketer
- Albert F. Pratt (1872–1928), American lawyer and congressman from Minnesota
- Albert Pratz (1914–1995), Canadian violinist, conductor, composer, and music educator
- Albert Praun (1894–1975), German Army general
- Albert Prebble (1973–1946), English badminton and tennis player
- Albert Prefontaine (1861–1935), Canadian politician from Manitoba
- Albert Préjean (1894–1979), French actor
- Albert Benjamin Prescott (1832–1905), American chemist
- Albert I. Prettyman (died 1963), American athletic administrator
- Albert Preuß (1864–unknown), German sport shooter
- Albert Thomas Price (1903–1978), British geophysicist
- Albert Prince (1825–1875), Canadian lawyer and politician from Ontario
- Albert Prince (1887–unknown), English footballer
- Albert Prince-Cox (1890–1967), English footballer, manager, referee, boxer, and boxing promoter
- Albert Prior (1921–1971), Australian rules footballer
- Albert Prisco (1890–unknown), American actor
- Albert Prisse (1788–1856), Belgian soldier, engineer, diplomat, and statesman
- Albert Richard Pritchard (1863–1927), American businessman
- Albert Probst (1931–2015), German politician
- Albert Profumo (1879–1940), English barrister
- Albert Prosa (born 1990), Estonian footballer
- Albert Proud (born 1988), Australian rules footballer
- Albert Prowse (1858–1925), Canadian merchant and political figure
- Albert Prus (born 1987), Russian footballer
- Albert Pryce-Jones (1870–1946), Welsh footballer
- Albert John Pucci (1920–2005), American multi-genre visual artist
- Albert Pudas (1899–1976), Finnish-Canadian ice hockey player and coach
- Albert Pugsley (1910–2002), Australian agricultural scientist
- Albert Puig (born 1968), Spanish football manager
- Albert Puig (swimmer) (born 1994), Spanish swimmer
- Albert Puigdollers (born 1980), Spanish footballer
- Albert Pujols (born 1980), Dominican-American major league baseball player
- Albert Pulitzer (1851–1909), American newspaper publisher
- Albert J. Pullen (1861–1937), American senator from Wisconsin
- Albert Pullins (1910–1985), American basketball player
- Albert Purcell (1913–2001), English footballer
- Albert Purchas (1825–1909), Australian architect
- Albert Purdy (1899–1991), English footballer
- Albert Putt (1927–2007), New Zealand cricketer
- Albert Pynegar (1895–1978), English footballer
- Albert Pyun (1953–2022), American film director
- Albert Que, Filipino politician
- Albert Quinn (1920–2008), English footballer
- Albert Quiquet (1862–1934), French actuary and statistician
- Albert Quixall (1933–2020), English footballer
- Albert Raaen (1887–1971), Norwegian trade unionist and politician
- Albert I. Rabin (1912–2010), American-Lithuanian psychologist
- Albert J. Raboteau (1943–2021), American scholar
- Albert Raby (1933–1988), American civil rights activist
- Albert Rachkov (1927–2023), Soviet-Russian diplomat and politician
- Albert Racine (1907–1984), American artist
- Albert Ernest Radford (1918–2006), American botanist
- Albert Raes (1932–unknown), Belgian magistrate
- Albert Rafetraniaina (born 1996), Malagasy footballer
- Albert Ràfols-Casamada (1923–2009), Spanish painter, poet, and art teacher
- Albert Raines, American long-distance runner
- Albert Rains (1865–1947), New Zealand cricketer
- Albert Rains (1902–1991), American congressman from Alabama
- Albert Raisner (1922–2011), French harmonica player, television host, radio host, and producer
- Albert Raitanen (1886–1918), Finnish politician
- Albert Ramassamy (1923–2018), French politician
- Albert Ramdin (born 1958), Surinamese diplomat
- Albert Ramírez (born 1992), Venezuelan light heavyweight boxer
- Albert Ramon (1920–1993), Belgian racing cyclist
- Albert Ramos Viñolas (born 1988), Spanish tennis player
- Albert Ramsden, New Zealand rugby footballer
- Albert Ramsey (1813–1869), American United States Army translator and journalist
- Albert Ranft (1858–1938), Swedish theatre director and actor
- Albert Rasco (1925–1989), American congressman from Pennsylvania
- Albert Rakoto Ratsimamanga (1907–2001), Malagasy physician, biochemist, and diplomat
- Albert Newton Raub (1840–1904), American educator and academic administrator
- Albert Ravila (1897–1980), Finnish sports shooter and military officer
- Albert Rawson (1896–1949), English footballer
- Albert Ray (1897–1944), American film director, actor, and screenwriter
- Albert Razbaum (1937–unknown), Latvian flautist
- Albert Razin (1940–2019), Udmurt language rights activist
- Albert Read (1893–1959), English footballer
- Albert Read, British business executive
- Albert Cushing Read (1887–1967), American United States Navy Rear Admiral and aviator
- Albert B. Reagan (1871–1936), American author and historian
- Albert William Recht (1898–1962), American mathematician and astronomer
- Albert Redhead, Grenadian lawyer and judge
- Albert Reed (1846–1931), English cricketer
- Albert Reed (born 1985), American model
- Albert Reed Jr. (1922–1986), American actor and police officer
- Albert Edwin Reed (1846–1920), British businessman
- Albert Rees (1921–1992), American economist and author
- Albert Lloyd George Rees (1916–1989), Australian chemical physicist
- Albert Reese (born 2002), Canadian football player
- Albert L. Reeves (1873–1971), American district judge from Missouri
- Albert L. Reeves Jr. (1906–1987), American attorney, businessman, and congressman from Missouri
- Albert Regge (1866–unknown), German trade union leader
- Albert Regis (born 2003), American football player
- Albert Regnier (1872–1925), French sports shooter
- Albert Rehm (1871–1949), German philologist
- Albert Reich (1881–1942), German painter, graphic designer, draftsman, and illustrator
- Albert Reichmann (1929–2022), Canadian businessman
- Albert Reid (1886–1962), Australian politician
- Albert Reiss (1870–1940), German operatic tenor
- Albert J. Reiss (1922–2006), American sociologist and criminologist
- Albert Relf (1874–1937), English cricketer
- Albert Rémy (1915–1967), French actor
- Albert Renaud (1855–1924), French organist and composer
- Albert Renaud (1920–2012), Canadian ice hockey player
- Albert L. Rendlen (1922–2009), American Supreme Court justice from Missouri
- Albert Renger-Patzsch (1897–1966), German photographer
- Albert Rénier (1896–1948), French footballer
- Albert Renold (1923–1988), Swiss physician and clinical biochemist
- Albert Resis (1921–2021), American academic, writer, and historian
- Albert Reuss (1889–1975), Austrian-British painter and sculptor
- Albert Reuter (1907–2003), Luxembourgish footballer
- Albert Réville (1826–1906), French theologian
- Albert Reyes (1941–1992), Mexican-born American director and producer for theatre, radio, and television
- Albert Reyes (born 1996), Andorran footballer
- Albert Reynolds (1932–2014), Irish politician; Taoiseach of Ireland from 1992 to 1994
- Albert Reynolds (born 1988), Saint Lucian javelin thrower
- Albert C. Reynolds, American engineer, mathematician, and professor
- Albert Rhodes (1840–1894), American diplomat and author
- Albert Rhodes (1889–1970), English cricketer
- Albert Rhodes (1916–1983), English cricketer, known professionally as Dusty Rhodes
- Albert Rhoton Jr. (1932–2016), American neurosurgeon and professor
- Albert Ribaucour (1845–1893), French civil engineer and mathematician
- Albert E. Rice (1845–1921), American banker, newspaperman, legislator, politician, and Lieutenant Governor of Minnesota from 1887 to 1891
- Albert Richards (1903–1973), English footballer
- Albert Richards (1919–1945), British artist
- Albert Richards (1924–2003), New Zealand long-distance runner
- Albert G. Richards (1917–2008), American photographer and dental scientist
- Albert Norton Richards (1821–1897), Canadian lawyer and politician
- Albert Richardson (1864–1937), American farmer and congressman from Wisconsin
- Albert Richardson (c. 1868–unknown), British missionary
- Albert Richardson (1880–1964), English architect, teacher, and writer
- Albert D. Richardson (1833–1869), American journalist, Union spy, and author
- Albert E. Richardson, English iron turner, fitter, and inventor
- Albert F. Richardson (1868–1932), American law enforcement officer and politician
- Albert Richter (1909–2007), German academic and forester
- Albert Richter (1912–1940), German cyclist
- Albert Ricot (1826–1902), French civil engineer, ironmaster, and politician
- Albert G. Riddle (1816–1902), American congressman from Ohio
- Albert Alphonso Ridge (1898–1967), American judge
- Albert Riederer (1945–2012), American jurist and politician
- Albert Rieker (1889–1959), American sculptor
- Albert Riemenschneider (1878–1950), American musician and musicologist
- Albert Riera (born 1982), Spanish footballer and manager
- Albert Riera (born 1983), Spanish footballer and manager
- Albert Rieux (1914–1983), French actor
- Albert Rigby (1901–1963), Australian cricketer
- Albert Riggenbach (1854–1921), Swiss meteorologist and author
- Albert Rigolot (1862–1932), French painter
- Albert Heinrich Riise (1810–1882), Danish pharmacist, merchant, and rum manufacturer
- Albert Joyce Riker (1894–1982), American plant pathologist and professor
- Albert Risso, Gibraltarian trade unionist and politician
- Albert Ritchie (1876–1936), American lawyer and politician, Governor of Maryland from 1920 to 1935
- Albert Ritserveldt (1915–2002), Belgian racing cyclist
- Albert Ritzenberg (1918–2018), American tennis player, coach, and tennis historian
- Albert Ritzhaupt (born 1980), American educational researcher, author, professor, and computer scientist
- Albert Rivaud (1876–1955), French philosopher and scholar
- Albert Rivera (born 1979), Spanish politician
- Albert Rivett (1855–1934), Australian clergyman and pacifist
- Albert Rivière (1891–1953), French tailor and politician
- Albert Robbe (1916–unknown), Belgian heavyweight boxer
- Albert Roberts (1908–2000), British politician
- Albert H. Roberts (1868–1946), American politician, educator, and jurist, Governor of Tennessee from 1919 to 1921
- Albert Robertson (1864–1952), Canadian legislator from Alberta
- Albert Robida (1848–1926), French illustrator, etcher, lithographer, caricaturist, and novelist
- Albert Robinson (1863–1948), Anglican priest
- Albert Robinson (1877–1943), Australian politician
- Albert Robinson (1913–unknown), English footballer
- Albert Robinson (born 1938), American congressman from Kentucky
- Albert Robinson (1948–1995), English footballer
- Albert Robinson (born 1964), American sprinter
- Albert Alonzo Robinson (1844–1918), American civil engineer
- Albert H. Robinson (1881–1956), Canadian painter
- Albert Roßhaupter (1878–1949), Bavarian politician and newspaper editor
- Albert Robles (born 1969), American politician, Mayor of Carson, California from 2015 to 2020
- Albert T. Robles, American politician, councilman, treasurer, deputy city manager, and Mayor of South Gate, California in 1991
- Albert Roca (born 1962), Spanish footballer and manager
- Albert Rocas (born 1982), Spanish handball player
- Albert Roccardi (1864–1934), Italian silent film actor
- Albert Severin Roche (1895–1939), French soldier
- Albert Rockwell (1862–1925), American inventor, manufacturer, industrialist, and philanthropist
- Albert P. Rockwood (1805–1879), American Latter Day Saint
- Albert S. Rodda (1912–2010), American senator from California
- Albert S. Rogell (1901–1988), American film director
- Albert Rohan (1936–2019), Austrian diplomat
- Albert A. Rollestone (c. 1866–1952), American Presbyterian philanthropist and oil pioneer
- Albert Rollit (1842–1922), British politician, lawyer, and businessman
- Albert Ronsin (1928–2007), French scholar, historian, librarian, and curator
- Albert H. Rooks (1891–1942), American United States Navy captain and Medal of Honor recipient
- Albert Rop (born 1992), Kenyan long-distance runner
- Albert Rosas (born 2002), Andorran footballer
- Albert Rose (1901–1961), American long jumper
- Albert Rose (1910–1990), American physicist
- Albert Rose-Innes (1868–1946), South African cricketer
- Albert Rosellini (1910–2011), American congressman, Governor of Washington from 1957 to 1965
- Albert Rosen (1924–1997), Austrian-Czech conductor
- Albert "Al" Rosen (1924–2015), American major league baseball player
- Albert Rosenblatt (born 1936), American judge
- Albert Rosenfeld (1885–1970), Australian rugby league player
- Albert Rosenthal (1863–1939), American artist, printmaker, writer, and collector
- Albert J. Rosenthal (1919–2010), American legal scholar and specialist
- Albert Rosewig (1846–1929), American composer
- Albert Ross (1916–1998), English footballer
- Albert Henderson Wade Ross (1884–1939), American businessman, lawyer, newspaper owner, and baseball team owner
- Albert Henry Ross (1881–1950), English advertising agent and freelance writer
- Albert Randolph Ross (1868–1948), American architect
- Albert S. Ross (1897–1987), American architect
- Albert B. Rossdale (1878–1968), American congressman from New York
- Albert Rostenkowski (1875–1929), American congressman from Illinois
- Albert Rösti (born 1967), Swiss businessman, lobbyist, and politician
- Albert Rothenberg (born 1930), American psychiatrist
- Albert Rouet (1936–unknown), French Roman Catholic bishop
- Albert Roussel (1869–1937), French composer
- Albert Rousselle, French racing cyclist
- Albert Roussin (1821–1896), French politician
- Albert Roussos (born 1996), Greek footballer
- Albert Roux (1935–2021), French restaurateur and chef
- Albert Rowe (1872–1955), Australian politician
- Albert Rowe (1898–1976), British radar pioneer and university administrator
- Albert Rowland (1885–1918), New Zealand track and field athlete
- Albert Roy (born 1939), Canadian politician and jurist
- Albert Roze (1861–1952), French sculptor
- Albert Rubens (1614–1657), Flemish philologist and scholar
- Albert Rubin (1887–1956), Bulgarian painter, sculptor, graphic artist, and illustrator
- Albert S. Ruddy (born 1930), Canadian-American film and television producer
- Albert Rudé (born 1987), Spanish football manager
- Albert Rudomine (1892–1975), French photographer
- Albert J. Ruffo (1908–2003), American politician, philanthropist, educator, lawyer, and college football coach
- Albert Leroy Rule (1886–1943), American documentary producer and director
- Albert Gleason Ruliffson (1833–1896), American minister
- Albert Rupprecht (born 1968), German politician
- Albert Rusnák (born 1974), Slovak footballer and manager
- Albert Rusnák (born 1994), Slovak footballer
- Albert Russell (1884–1975), Scottish politician, lawyer, and judge
- Albert Russell (1890–1929), American director, screenwriter, and actor
- Albert Russo (born 1943), Belgian author, essayist, and poet
- Albert Rust (c. 1818–1870), American politician and slaveholder
- Albert Rust (born 1953), French football goalkeeper
- Albert G. Rutherford (1879–1941), American congressman from Pennsylvania
- Albert Rutherston (1881–1953), British artist
- Albert Cornelius Ruyl, Dutch trader and translator
- Albert James Ryan (1884–1955), New Zealand commercial traveler, newspaper publisher, Irish nationalist, and land agent
- Albert Rybak (born 1973), Belarusian footballer and manager
- Albert Janse Ryckman (c. 1642–1737), Dutch politician
- Albert Pinkham Ryder (1847–1917), American painter
- Albert Sabin (1906–1993), Polish-American medical researcher who developed an oral polio vaccine; President of the Weizmann Institute of Science
- Albert F. Sabo (1920–2002), American lawyer and judge
- Albert Sacco (born 1949), American chemical engineer and astronaut
- Albert Sack (1915–2011), American antiques dealer and author
- Albert M. Sackett (1920–2016), American United States Navy rear admiral
- Albert Sacks (1920–1991), American lawyer and academic
- Albert Sadacca (1901–1980), American inventor
- Albert Safaryan (born 1963), Armenian actor
- Albert Saijo (1926–2011), Japanese-American poet
- Albert Sala (born 1981), Spanish field hockey player
- Albert Sale (1850–1874), American United States Army soldier and Medal of Honor recipient
- Albert Saléza (1867–1916), French tenor opera singer
- Albert Salmi (1928–1990), American stage, film, and television actor
- Albert Salomon (1883–1976), Jewish-German surgeon
- Albert Salomon (1891–1966), German-Jewish sociologist
- Albert Salomon (1935–2020), Bulgarian-Israeli accordion player and social activist
- Albert Salomon Anselm von Rothschild (1844–1911), Austria-Hungarian banker
- Albert Salter (1816–1874), Canadian land surveyor
- Albert Salvadó (1951–2020), Andorran writer and industrial engineer
- Albert Samain (1858–1900), French poet and writer
- Albert Samama Chikly (1872–1934), Tunisian filmmaker and photographer
- Albert Sambi Lokonga (born 1999), Belgian footballer
- Albert Morris Sames (1873–1958), American United States district judge from Arizona
- Albert Sammons (1886–1957), English violinist, composer, and violin teacher
- Albert Sammt (1889–1982), German commander
- Albert Samreth (born 1987), American artist
- Albert Samuel (1876–1963), New Zealand politician
- Albert Samuels (1900–1982), British politician
- Albert Sánchez Piñol (born 1965), Spanish anthropologist, writer, and novelist
- Albert W. Sanborn (1853–1937), American congressman from Vermont
- Albert George Sandeman (1833–1923), English businessman and Governor of the Bank of England
- Albert Sanders (1889–1957), Canadian politician from Alberta
- Albert Sandrin Jr. (1923–2004), American chess master
- Albert Sangwine (1901–1962), English freestyle sport wrestler
- Albert Sanschagrin (1911–2009), Canadian Roman Catholic Bishop
- Albert Santoli, American writer
- Albert Saritov (born 1985), Russian-Romanian freestyle wrestler
- Albert Sarkisyan (born 1963), Armenian footballer and manager
- Albert Sarkisyan (born 1975), Armenian footballer and coach
- Albert Sarraut (1872–1962), French politician and Prime Minister of France in 1933 and 1936
- Albert Sassoon (1818–1896), Iraqi-English businessman and philanthropist
- Albert Sauer (1898–1945), German Nazi SS officer and concentration camp commandant of Mauthausen-Gusen and Kaiserwald concentration camps
- Albert Bokhare Saunders (1880–1946), Australian composer and musician
- Albert Charles Saunders (1874–1943), Canadian jurist and politician from Prince Edward Island
- Albert Sauveur (1863–1939), Belgian-American metallurgist
- Albert Savage (1888–unknown), English footballer
- Albert R. Savage (1847–1917), American attorney and congressman from Maine
- Albert Sawley (1915–1983), Australian rules footballer
- Albert Gerald Sayre (1897–1990), American radioman and Arctic explorer
- Albert Scaddan (1887–1967), Australian rules footballer
- Albert Scanes (1900–1969), Australian cricketer
- Albert Scanlon (1935–2009), English footballer
- Albert Scardino, American journalist and newspaper publisher
- Albert Schaack (1936–2016), Luxembourgish footballer
- Albert Schädler (1848–1922), Liechtenstein physician, historian, and politician
- Albert Charles Schaeffer (1907–1957), American mathematician
- Albert Schaff (1885–1968), French footballer
- Albert Schäffle (1831–1903), German sociologist, political economist, and newspaper editor
- Albert Schagidullin, Russian bass-baritone opera singer
- Albert Schaller (1857–1934), American jurist, politician, and businessman
- Albert Schatz (1839–1910), German musicologist, musician, and composer
- Albert Schatz (1879–1940), French law professor and historian
- Albert Schatz (1920–2005), American microbiologist and academic
- Albert Gerard Schatz (1921–1985), American United States district judge
- Albert Schaufelberger (1949–1983), American United States Navy lieutenant commander
- Albert Scherb (1839–1908), Swiss politician
- Albert Scherrer (1908–1986), Swiss racing driver
- Albert Schickedanz (1846–1915), Austria-Hungarian architect and painter
- Albert Schiess (born 1951), Swiss sailor
- Albert Schindler (1805–1861), Austrian painter and graphic artist
- Albert Schinz (1870–1943), American-French philosophical scholar, editor, and professor
- Albert Nicolai Schioldann (1843–1917), Danish master mason, developer, and philanthropist
- Albert Schippel (1862–1935), American architect
- Albert Leo Schlageter (1894–1923), German military officer
- Albert Schlicklin (1857–1932), Vietnamese-French Alsatian Catholic priest
- Albert Schluter (1923–2007), German-Australian immigration activist
- Albert G. Schmedeman (1864–1946), German-American politician and diplomat
- Albert-Marie Schmidt (1901–1966), French linguist
- Albert Schmidt (born 1948), German Benedictine monk and abbot
- Albert Schneider (1884–1924), American architect
- Albert Schnelzer (born 1972), Swedish composer
- Albert Schnez (1911–2007), German Army and Nazi officer
- Albert Frederick Schoenhut (1849–1912), American toy producer and businessman
- Albert F. Schoepper (1913–1997), American U.S. Marine music consultant
- Albert Gallatin Scholfield (1807–1901), American businessman
- Albert Schönhofer (died 1493), German Roman Catholic prelate
- Albert Schorn, German sprint canoeist
- Albert Schou (1849–1900), Danish photographer
- Albert Schram (born 1964), Dutch university administrator
- Albert Schreiner (1892–1979), German political activist and historian
- Albert Schultens (1686–1750), Dutch philologist
- Albert Schultz (born 1963), Canadian actor, director, and artistic director
- Albert Schulz (1802–1893), German writer
- Albert Schumberg (1909–1967), German swimmer
- Albert Hugo Schuster (1912–1973), German Nazi war criminal
- Albert E. Schwab (1920–1945), American U.S. Marine soldier and Medal of Honor recipient
- Albert Schwartz (1908–1986), American swimmer
- Albert Schwartz (1923–1992), American zoologist
- Albert Schwarz (born 1934), Soviet-American mathematician and theoretical physicist
- Albert Schwegler (1819–1857), German philosopher and theologian
- Albert Schweitzer (1875–1965), French-German theologian, organist, philosopher, physician, and medical missionary
- Albert Schweitzer (1921–2023), American artist and cartoonist
- Albert E. Schwittay (1874–1913), American lawyer, newspaper publisher, and politician
- Albert Charles Scott (1872–1969), British Royal Navy officer
- Albert Seabi (born 1962), South African politician
- Albert Sealy (1917–2008), American congressman from Ohio
- Albert Seay (1916–1984), American musicologist
- Albert Sechehaye (1870–1946), Swiss linguist
- Albert Secrétant (1906–1991), French cross-country skier
- Albert Seedman (1918–2013), American NYPD officer
- Albert Seerig (1797–1862), German surgeon and anatomist
- Albert Séguin (1891–1948), French gymnast
- Albert Seibel (1844–1936), French physician and viticulturist
- Albert Seitz (1872–1937), French composer and viola player
- Albert Selim El-Mankabadi (1917–1970), Egyptian rower
- Albert Selimov (born 1986), Russian boxer
- Albert G. Semmes (1810–1883), American lawyer
- Albert Richard Sendrey (1911–2003), American composer, conductor, and arranger
- Albert Sercu (1918–1978), Belgian road cyclist
- Albert Serra (born 1975), Spanish filmmaker and film production manager
- Albert Serra (born 1978), Spanish footballer
- Albert Serrán (born 1984), Spanish footballer
- Albert Servaes (1883–1966), Belgian painter
- Albert Yonathan Setyawan (born 1983), Indonesian ceramic artist
- Albert Sévigny (1881–1961), Canadian politician and judge from Quebec
- Albert Seward (1863–1941), British botanist and geologist
- Albert Sewell (1927–2018), English football statistician and sports journalist
- Albert Seymour (1841–1908), English Archdeacon of Barnstaple from 1890 to 1908
- Albert Sézary (1880–1956), French dermatologist and syphilogist
- Albert R. Shadle (1885–1963), American biologist
- Albert Shakhov (born 1975), Ukrainian footballer and manager
- Albert Elay Shaltiel (born 1969), Israeli businessman
- Albert Shanker (1928–1997), American labor leader
- Albert Sharipov (born 1993), Russian footballer
- Albert Sharpe (1877–1966), American college football player, basketball player, baseball player, coach, athletic director, and medical doctor
- Albert Sharpe (1885–1970), Irish actor
- Albert Shaw (1857–1947), American journalist and academic
- Albert Shaw, English footballer
- Albert D. Shaw (1841–1901), American government official and politician from New York
- Albert Shcherbakov (born 1976), Russian footballer
- Albert Shchukin (born 1971), Russian footballer and coach
- Albert Shelton (1875–1922), American medical doctor and Protestant missionary
- Albert Shepherd (1885–1929), English footballer
- Albert Shepherd (1936–2019), English actor
- Albert Edward Shepherd (1897–1966), English British Army soldier and Victoria Cross recipient
- Albert W. Sherer Jr. (1916–1986), American diplomat
- Albert Shesternyov (1941–1994), Russian footballer
- Albert Shibura (born 1939), Burundian politician and military officer
- Albert F. Shields (1908–1974), American mechanical engineer
- Albert Cavendish Shillingford (1882–1938), Dominican businessman
- Albert D. Shimek (1873–1960), American congressman from Wisconsin
- Albert Shin, Canadian filmmaker
- Albert Shingiro (born 1970), Burundian diplomat
- Albert Micajah Shipp (1819–1887), American Methodist minister and university administrator
- Albert Shiryaev (born 1934), Soviet-Russian mathematician
- Albert Ferdinand Shore (1876–1936), American metallurgist
- Albert Shugg (1894–1941), Australian cricketer
- Albert Shutt (born 1952), English cricketer
- Albert Sigl (1911–1969), German sports shooter
- Albert Siklós (1878–1942), Hungarian composer
- Albert Silva (1917–2009), Sri Lankan politician
- Albert Simard (ca. 1891–1973), French-American medical doctor, Legion of Honour recipient
- Albert T. W. Simeons (1900–1970), British endocrinologist and medical doctor
- Albert Simmonds (1875–1953), American college football coach
- Albert G. Simms (1882–1964), American congressman from New Mexico
- Albert Simon (1901–1956), Luxembourgish painter
- Albert J. Simone (born 1935), American university president
- Albert Simonin (1905–1980), French novelist and scriptwriter
- Albert Simons (1890–1980), American architect
- Albert Simonson (1914–1965), American chess master
- Albert Simonsz (1523–1600s), Dutch painter
- Albert Benjamin Simpson (1843–1919), Canadian preacher, theologian, author, and businessman
- Albert Sims (1871–1962), Australian cricketer
- Albert Sinabov (born 2007), Bulgarian footballer
- Albert Sing (1917–2008), German footballer and manager
- Albert Sissons (1903–after 1927), English footballer
- Albert Siu, Cuban-American internist and geriatrician
- Albert Sixtus (1892–1960), German writer
- Albert Škarvan (1869–1926), Slovak physician, writer, and translator
- Albert M. Skeels (1813–1876), American businessman and congressman from Wisconsin
- Albert Skinner (1868–unknown), English footballer
- Albert Skira (1904–1973), Swiss art dealer, publisher, and businessman
- Albert Sleeper (1862–1934), American politician and Governor of Michigan from 1917 to 1921
- Albert Sleumer (1876–1964), German doctor and Catholic priest
- Albert Sloman (1921–2012), English academic and college administrator
- Albert Sloss (1911–1990), Australian politician
- Albert H. Small (1925–2021), American real estate developer and philanthropist
- Albert E Smedley (1895–1965), Australian Army Sergeant
- Albert Smethurst (1868–1935), British trade unionist
- Albert Smidt (c. 1847–1890), German-Australian serial killer
- Albert Smijers (1888–1957), Dutch musicologist and academic
- Albert Smith (1793–1867), American congressman from Maine
- Albert Smith (1805–1870), American congressman and judge from New York
- Albert Smith (1863–unknown), English cricketer
- Albert Smith (1867–1942), British trade unionist and politician
- Albert Smith (1869–1921), English footballer
- Albert Smith (1881–1965), Australian politician
- Albert Smith (1885–1975), Australian politician
- Albert Smith (1887–1929), English footballer
- Albert Smith (1898–unknown), English footballer
- Albert Smith (1905–unknown), Scottish footballer
- Albert Alexander Smith (1896–1940), American artist, illustrator, and jazz musician
- Albert C. Smith (1894–1974), American U.S. Army Major general
- Albert Charles Smith (1906–1999), American botanist and museum director
- Albert Daniel Smith (1887–1970), American aviator and U.S. Army brigadier general
- Albert E. Smith (1875–1958), English stage magician, film director, and producer
- Albert E. Smith, American congressman from Wisconsin
- Albert Edward Smith (1871–1947), Canadian religious leader and politician
- Albert Eugene Smith (1907–1973), American computing pioneer
- Albert Hugh Smith (1903–1967), English scholar
- Albert J. Smith (1894–1939), American actor
- Albert James Smith (1822–1883), Canadian politician
- Albert Joseph Smith (1898–1973), American United States Marine Corps sergeant and Medal of Honor recipient
- Albert L. Smith Jr. (1931–1997), American congressman from Alabama
- Albert Richard Smith (1816–1860), English author, entertainer, and mountaineer
- Albert Smithson (1911–unknown), English footballer
- Albert Smoke (1894–1944), Canadian long-distance runner
- Albert E. S. Smythe (1861–1947), Irish-Canadian journalist, poet, and politician
- Albert Henry Smyth (1863–1907), American history and English professor, writer, editor, and curator
- Albert Snaer (1902–1962), American jazz trumpeter
- Albert Snell (1931–2007), English footballer
- Albert Snider (1921–1948), Canadian-American horse jockey
- Albert Snow (1852–1909), English cricketer
- Albert Soboul (1914–1982), French historian
- Albert Socin (1844–1899), Swiss orientalist
- Albert Sojourner (1872–1951), American congressman from Mississippi
- Albert Solia (died 2020), French politician
- Albert Solliday (1841–1924), American dentist, soldier, and congressman from Wisconsin, Mayor of Watertown, Wisconsin from 1884 to 1886
- Albert J. Solnit (1919–2002), American psychoanalyst
- Albert Solomon (1876–1914), Australian politician
- Albert Solomonov (born 1973), Russian-Israeli footballer, coach, and manager
- Albert Somit (1919–2020), American political scientist
- Albert Sommers (born 1959), American congressman from Wyoming
- Albert Sonnichsen (1878–1931), American journalist, author, and adventurer
- Albert Sorby Buxton (1867–1932), English painter, historian, and antiquarian
- Albert Sorel (1842–1906), French historian
- Albert Sorensen (born 1932), American congressman from Iowa
- Albert O. Sorge (1881–1967), American businessman and congressman from Wisconsin
- Albert Sosnowski (born 1979), Polish heavyweight boxer
- Albert Southwood (1882–1965), English cricketer
- Albert Southworth (1811–1894), American photographer
- Albert Spaggiari (1932–1989), French bank robber
- Albert Spahiu (born 1990), Kosovan-Swiss footballer
- Albert Spaier (1883–1934), French philosopher and academic
- Albert Spalding (1849–1915), American major league baseball pitcher, manager, baseball executive, and businessman
- Albert Spalding (1888–1953), American violinist and composer
- Albert Späni (born 1927), Swiss sports shooter
- Albert Spanswick (1919–1983), British trade unionist
- Albert Spaulding (1914–1990), American anthropologist and archaeologist
- Albert Spear (1852–1929), American congressman and United States Supreme Court Chief Justice from Maine
- Albert Speer (1905–1981), German architect and Minister of Armaments and War Production from 1942 to 1945
- Albert Speer (1934–2017), German architect and urban planner
- Albert Friedrich Speer (1863–1947), German architect
- Albert Spencer, English footballer
- Albert Henry Spencer (1886–1971), Australian bookseller
- Albert Spicer (1847–1934), English businessman and politician
- Albert Spillane, Australian rugby league footballer
- Albert Spilsbury (1894–1959), English football goalkeeper
- Albert Spradling Jr. (1920–2004), American senator from Missouri
- Albert Sprott (1897–1951), American middle-distance runner
- Albert Squires (born 1958), Canadian weightlifter
- Albert Ssempeke, Ugandan musician
- Albert Stahl (born 1999), Romanian footballer
- Albert Staine (1928–1987), Belizean judge
- Albert Stall Jr. (born 1961), American Thoroughbred horse racing trainer
- Albert Stanaj (born 1994), Albanian-American singer and songwriter
- Albert Stange (1899–unknown), German police official and politician
- Albert Stanhope Elmore (1827–1909), American politician
- Albert Stankowski (born 1971), Polish historian
- Albert Stanley (1863–1915), English politician
- Albert Stanley (1874–1948), British-American businessman
- Albert Starchevsky (1818–1901), Russian literary historian, journalist, editor, philologist, lexicographer, and encyclopedist
- Albert P. Stark (1863–1938), American Supreme Court justice from Montana
- Albert Starr (1926–2024), American cardiovascular surgeon
- Albert Staton (1899–1980), American college football and basketball player and businessman
- Albert Steck (1843–1899), Swiss politician
- Albert Stecken (1915–2011), German Nazi officer, Knight's Cross of the Iron Cross recipient
- Albert Steede (born 1968), Bermudian cricketer
- Albert Steeples (1870–1945), English cricketer
- Albert Steffen (1884–1963), Swiss poet, painter, dramatist, essayist, and novelist
- Albert Stegemann (born 1976), German politician
- Albert Barnes Steinberger (1841–1894), American agent, Prime Minister of Samoa (1875–1876)
- Albert Steiner (1877–1965), Swiss photographer
- Albert Steinmetz (1909–1984), German sprinter
- Albert Steinrück (1872–1929), German stage and film actor
- Albert Stephens, American major league baseball pitcher
- Albert Lee Stephens (1874–1965), American United States circuit judge from Indiana
- Albert Lee Stephens Jr. (1913–2001), American United States district judge from California
- Albert Victor Sterling (died 1945), Canadian legislator from Saskatchewan
- Albert Stern, American violinist
- Albert Gerald Stern (1878–1966), English banker
- Albert Sterner (1863–1946), British-American illustrator and painter
- Albert Sterz, German noble
- Albert Stevens (1887–1966), American house painter and test patient also known as the most radioactive human ever
- Albert K. Stevens (1901–1984), American scholar, professor, and working class activist
- Albert Leo Stevens (1877–1944), American balloonist pioneer
- Albert William Stevens (1886–1949), American United States Army Air Corps officer, balloonist, and aerial photographer
- Albert Stewart (1889–1917), Irish rugby union player and British Army officer
- Albert Stewart (1900–1965), American sculptor
- Albert Oliphant Stewart (1884–1958), New Zealand tribal leader, law clerk, interpreter, politician, and rate collector
- Albert Stigzelius (1853–1928), Finnish jurist and politician
- Albert Stinson (1944–1969), American jazz double-bassist
- Albert Stirn (1903–unknown), Luxembourgish footballer
- Albert A. Stirpe Jr. (born 1953), American politician from New York
- Albert Stitfall (1924–1998), Welsh footballer
- Albert Stock (1897–1969), Welsh rugby union footballer
- Albert Stöckl (1823–1895), German neo-scholastic philosopher and theologian
- Albert Stoessel (1894–1943), American composer, violinist, and conductor
- Albert Stohr (1890–1961), German Roman Catholic Bishop
- Albert Stokes (1933–2014), English footballer
- Albert Stolow (born 1959), Canadian physicist
- Albert M. Stondall (1865–1934), American businessman and senator from Wisconsin
- Albert Stone (1928–2023), American businessman and philanthropist
- Albert Eduard Stoové (1920–2010), Dutch Air Force Sergeant
- Albert Stopford (1860–1939), British antiques and art dealer
- Albert Boynton Storms (1860–1933), American professor, university administrator, and Methodist theologian
- Albert Strange (1855–1917), English artist and yacht designer
- Albert Strange (1905–1990), Australian rules footballer
- Albert Strauss (1876–1963), American fencer
- Albert Streckeisen (1901–1998), Swiss petrographer and petrologist
- Albert Streit (born 1980), Romanian-German footballer
- Albert Strickler (1887–1963), Swiss mechanical engineer
- Albert Strickler (1955–2023), French poet and author
- Albert Ströck (1903–1971), Romanian-Hungarian footballer
- Albert Strohschein (1905–1985), Canadian politician from Alberta
- Albert Stroni (born 1971), Albanian footballer
- Albert P.L. Stroucken (born 1947), Dutch businessman
- Albert R. Stuart (1906–1973), American Episcopal bishop
- Albert Stubbins (1919–2002), English footballer
- Albert Stubblebine (1930–2017), American United States Army major general
- Albert Stuivenberg (born 1970), Dutch footballer, coach, and manager
- Albert Stunkard (1922–2014), American psychiatrist
- Albert Sturges (1819–1887), American Protestant missionary and minister
- Albert Sturgess (1882–1957), English footballer
- Albert D. Sturtevant (1894–1918), American United States Navy officer
- Albert Suárez (born 1989), Venezuelan major league baseball pitcher
- Albert Subirats (born 1986), Venezuelan swimmer
- Albert Suerbeer (c. 1200–1273), Livonian Archbishop
- Albert Suho, German cleric and writer
- Albert Sukop (1912–1993), German footballer
- Albert Sulon (1938–2020), Belgian footballer
- Albert E. Summers (1824–1901), American senator from West Virginia
- Albert Sund (1884–1960), Norwegian trade unionist and politician
- Albert Sutanto (born 1975), Indonesian swimmer
- Albert C. Sutphin (1895–1974), American sports promoter and businessman
- Albert Sutton (1874–1946), Australian politician
- Albert Suurkivi (1894–1977), Estonian politician
- Albert H. Sweetser (1848–1889), American snuff manufacturer and congressman from Massachusetts
- Albert Swinden (1901–1961), English-American painter
- Albert Syben (born 1952), Belgian heavyweight boxer
- Albert Sykes (1900–1994), English footballer
- Albert Sylla (1909–1967), Malagasy medical doctor and politician
- Albert Hale Sylvester (1871–1944), American pioneer, explorer, and forest supervisor
- Albert Szabo (1925–2003), American architect, educator, and artist
- Albert Szatola (1927–2010), Hungarian equestrian
- Albert Szent-Györgyi (1893–1986), Hungarian biochemist
- Albert Szirmai (1880–1967), Hungarian operetta composer and music editor
- Albert Szukalski (1945–2000), Polish-Belgian artist
- Albert Taar (born 1990), Estonian footballer
- Albert Tadros (1914–1993), Egyptian basketball player
- Albert R. Tadych (1932–2001), American congressman from Wisconsin
- Albert Tafel (1876–1935), German geographer, medical doctor, and explorer
- Albert Taillandier (1879–1945), French racing cyclist
- Albert Takács (born 1955), Hungarian politician and jurist
- Albert Talbot (1877–1936), Australian Anglican Dean
- Albert G. Talbott (1808–1887), American congressman from Kentucky
- Albert Talipeau (born 1981), Samoan-Australian rugby league footballer
- Albert Tam (born 1972), Hong Kong writer
- Albert Mangaratua Tambunan (1910–1970), Dutch politician
- Albert Tangora (1903–1978), American speed typist
- Albert Klein Tank, British academic
- Albert Tannenbaum (1906–1976), Jewish-American hitman
- Albert Tarantola (1949–2009), Spanish physicist and author
- Albert Tarradas (born 1996), Catalan politician
- Albert Tate Jr. (1920–1986), American judge from Louisiana
- Albert Taubert (1900–1964), American United States Marine Corps major, Navy Cross and Distinguished Service Cross recipient
- Albert Tavkhelidze (1930–2010), Georgian physicist and scientist
- Albert Chevallier Tayler (1862–1925), English artist
- Albert Taylor (1877–1947), British trade unionist and political activist
- Albert Taylor (1894–1960), English cricketer
- Albert Taylor (1911–1988), Canadian rower
- Albert Davis Taylor (1883–1951), American architect and author
- Albert H. Taylor (1879–1961), American electrical engineer
- Albert Pierce Taylor (1872–1931), American archivist, journalist, and historian
- Albert R. Taylor (1864–1929), American educator
- Albert Tebbit (1871–1938), British speed skater
- Albert Techov (born 1980), Lithuanian judoka
- Albert Teich (1929–2010), American lawyer and politician
- Albert M. Ten Eyck (1869–1958), American agricultural academic and farmer
- Albert Payson Terhune (1872–1942), American writer, dog breeder, and journalist
- Albert Teruel (born 1987), Spanish basketball player
- Albert Tessier (1895–1976), French-Canadian priest, historian, and filmmaker
- Albert Tetteh Nyakotey (born 1965), Ghanaian politician
- Albert Tévoédjrè (1929–2019), Beninese writer and politician
- Albert Texeira (born 1960), Saint Vincent and the Grenadines cricketer
- Albert Thain (1900–1979), English footballer
- Albert R. Thayer (1878–1965), American painter and etcher
- Albert Theer (1815–1902), Austrian painter and lithographer
- Albert Vigoleis Thelen (1903–1989), German author and translator
- Albert Thellung (1881–1928), Swiss botanist
- Albert Themba, South African politician
- Albert Thévenon (1901–1959), French water polo player
- Albert Thibaudet (1874–1936), French essayist and literary critic
- Albert Thierfelder (1842–1908), German pathologist
- Albert Thomas (1878–1932), French politician and Minister of Armament
- Albert Thomas (1893–unknown), Welsh cricketer
- Albert Thomas (1898–1966), American congressman from Texas
- Albert Ernest Thomas (1872–1923), Australian politician
- Albert Reuben Edward Thomas (1908–1983), English-Australian Roman Catholic bishop
- Albert Sidney Thomas (1873–1967), American Bishop
- Albert Thompson (1885–1956), English footballer
- Albert Thompson (1886–1966), Australian politician
- Albert Thompson (1912–unknown), Welsh footballer
- Albert Thompson (1922–2004), American jurist and congressman from Georgia
- Albert Thompson (born 1952), Irish sports shooter
- Albert C. Thompson (1842–1910), American District Court judge and congressman from Ohio
- Albert G. Thompson (1928–2016), American educator and philanthropist
- Albert Thornton (1856–1931), English cricketer
- Albert Thorpe, English footballer
- Albert Thurgood (1874–1927), Australian rules footballer
- Albert Thys (1849–1915), Belgian businessman
- Albert Thys (1894–1976), Belgian painter
- Albert Kakou Tiapani (c. 1944–2021), Ivorian politician
- Albert Ross Tilley (1904–1988), Canadian plastic surgeon
- Albert Tillman (1928–2004), American educator and underwater diver
- Albert Timmer (born 1985), Dutch road bicycle racer
- Albert Tingey Sr. (1869–1953), English golfer
- Albert Tipton (1917–1997), American flutist, pianist, and conductor
- Albert Tirrell (1824–1880), American murder suspect
- Albert Tissandier (1839–1906), French architect, aviator, illustrator, editor, and archaeologist
- Albert Titley (1918–1986), English footballer
- Albert Tiu (born 1969), Filipino pianist
- Albert Tocco (1929–2005), American mob boss who was active in the city of Chicago, Illinois
- Albert Todd (1813–1885), American lawyer and politician
- Albert E. Todd (1878–1928), Canadian politician and Mayor of British Columbia from 1917 to 1919
- Albert M. Todd (1850–1931), American chemist, businessman, and congressman from Michigan
- Albert Wheeler Todd (1856–1924), American architect
- Albert S. Toe (1953–2010), Liberian politician
- Albert Toeaina (born 1984), American Canadian and American football player
- Albert Toft (1862–1949), British sculptor
- Albert Toll (1865–1960), Australian businessman
- Albert Tom, American congressman from Arizona
- Albert Tomàs (born 1970), Spanish footballer
- Albert Tomkin (1915–1989), English footballer
- Albert Toney (1879–1931), American major league baseball player
- Albert Toney III (born 1966), American civil rights activist
- Albert Tonkin (1886–1969), Australian World War I flying ace
- Albert Tonkinson (1936–unknown), English rugby league footballer
- Albert Toris (1925–2022), French footballer
- Albert Törnqvist (1819–1898), Swedish architect
- Albert Toro (died 2019), Papua New Guinean actor, director, and politician
- Albert Torras (born 1996), Spanish footballer
- Albert Torrens (born 1976), Australian rugby league footballer
- Albert Torres (1956–2017), American salsa dancer
- Albert Torres (born 1990), Spanish track and road racing cyclist
- Albert Frederick Totzke (1882–1951), Canadian pharmacist and politician
- Albert Touchard (1876–unknown), French author
- Albert Touraine (1883–1961), French dermatologist
- Albert Alan Townsend (1917–2010), Australian scientist and author
- Albert E. Tozier (1860–1937), American newspaper editor and historian
- Albert Trachsel (1863–1929), Swiss painter, architect, and writer
- Albert H. Tracy (1793–1859), American lawyer and congressman from New York
- Albert Traeger (1830–1912), German parliamentarian and writer
- Albert Trapp (died 1953), Canadian legislator from Manitoba
- Albert Tresvant (1926–2004), American politician, Mayor of Opa-Locka, Florida from 1975 to 1976
- Albert C. Triaca (1875–?), Italian balloonist, pioneer aviator, and businessman
- Albert Trim (1875–1954), Australian rules footballer
- Albert Dominicus Trip van Zoudtlandt (1776–1835), Dutch lieutenant general
- Albert Tröndle (1886–unknown), Swiss sports shooter
- Albert Trott (1873–1914), Australian cricketer
- Albert Trueman (1902–1988), American-Canadian teacher, professor, and university administrator
- Albert Tsai (born 2004), American actor
- Albert Tsarayev (born 1967), Russian footballer and coach
- Albert Tschautsch (1843–1922), German painter
- Albert Joseph Tsiahoana (1927–2012), Malagasy Catholic archbishop
- Albert Tskhovrebov (born 1993), Russian footballer
- Albert Tucker (1843–1902), Australian politician
- Albert Tucker (1914–1999), Australian artist
- Albert W. Tucker (1905–1995), Canadian mathematician
- Albert Tugbe Chie, Liberian politician
- Albert Tuipulotu (born 1979), American rugby union player
- Albert Tuisue (born 1993), Fijian rugby union player
- Albert Tullgren (1874–1958), Swedish entomologist and arachnologist
- Albert Tumenov (born 1991), Russian mixed martial artist and boxer
- Albert Angus Turbayne (1866–1940), American book designer and bookbinding artist
- Albert Turnbull (1866–1929), New Zealand cricketer
- Albert Turner (1901–1985), English footballer
- Albert Turner (1936–2000), American civil rights activist and advisor to Martin Luther King Jr.
- Albert Twesme (1879–1949), American lawyer, jurist, and congressman from Wisconsin
- Albert L. Twesme (1914–1995), American lawyer and judge
- Albert Tye (1883–1917), English footballer
- Albert Tyler (1872–1945), American pole vaulter
- Albert Tyler (1906–1968), American marine biologist
- Albert Udachin (born 1941), Soviet sports shooter
- Albert Uderzo (1927–2020), French comic book artist
- Albert Lee Ueltschi (1917–2012), American aviation pioneer and philanthropist
- Albert Üksip (1886–1966), Estonian botanist
- Albert Ullin (1930–2018), German-Australian bookseller and businessman
- Albert Ulmann (1861–unknown), American banker and author
- Albert B. Ulrey (1860–1932), American marine biologist
- Albert A. Ultcht (1859–1943), American politician, Mayor of Melbourne, Florida (1922–1924)
- Albert Urfer (1914–1985), Swiss pianist and chansonnier
- Albert Urrea (born 1987), Spanish footballer
- Albert Uttley (1906–1985), English scientist
- Albert Uustulnd (1925–1997), Estonian writer and playwright
- Albert Uytenbogaardt (born 1930), South African football goalkeeper
- Albert Vadas (1876–1946), Croatian United States Navy seaman, Medal of Honor recipient
- Albert Vaguet (1865–1943), French opera singer
- Albert Robert Valentien (1862–1925), American painter, botanical artist, and ceramic artist
- Albert Valentin (1908–1968), Belgian screenwriter and film director
- Albert Valentine (1907–1990), English footballer
- Albert Vallci (born 1995), Austrian footballer
- Albert Vallvé (1945–2021), Spanish politician
- Albert Valsien (1882–1955), French composer and conductor
- Albert Valtin (1937–2015), Soviet basketball player
- Albert van Breugel (died 1687), Dutch politician
- Albert Van Cauwenburg (1891–unknown), Belgian equestrian
- Albert Van Coile (1900–1927), Belgian footballer
- Albert Van Damme (born 1940), Belgian cyclo-crosser
- Albert van Dantzig (1937–2000), Dutch historian
- Albert Van de Vliet (1917–unknown), Belgian canoe sprinter
- Albert Van Den Abeele (1907–unknown), Belgian sailor
- Albert Van den Berg (1890–1945), Belgian resistant
- Albert van den Berg (born 1957), Dutch physicist
- Albert van den Berg (rugby union) (born 1974), South African rugby union player
- Albert Jan van den Berg (born 1949), Dutch lawyer, businessman, and professor
- Albert Van Den Branden (1910–unknown), Belgian field hockey player
- Albert van der Haar (born 1975), Dutch footballer
- Albert van der Merwe (born 1979), South African-Irish cricketer
- Albert van der Sandt Centlivres (1887–1966), South African judge, Chief Justice of South Africa from 1950 to 1957
- Albert E. Van Dusen (1916–1999), American historian and academic
- Albert W. Van Duzer (1917–1999), American Episcopal bishop
- Albert Van Dyck (1902–1951), Belgian painter
- Albert Egges van Giffen (1884–1973), Dutch archaeologist
- Albert van Ouwater (c.1415–1475), Dutch painter
- Albert Jurardus van Prooijen (1834–1898), Dutch painter
- Albert van Raalte (1890–1952), Dutch conductor
- Albert van Schendel (1912–1990), Dutch road bicycle racer
- Albert van Spiers (1665–1718), Dutch painter
- Albert Van Vlierberghe (1942–1991), Belgian road bicycle racer
- Albert Van Zetten (born 1954), Australian politician, Mayor of Launceston, Tasmania from 2007 to 2022
- Albert Vanbuel (born 1940), Belgian Salesian missionary and bishop
- Albert Vandal (1853–1910), French historian
- Albert Dresden Vandam (1843–1903), English journalist and writer
- Albert Vandeplancke (1911–1939), French water polo player and swimmer
- Albert Vanhoye (1923–2021), French priest and Jesuit biblical scholar
- Albert Vanloo (1846–1920), Belgian librettist and playwright
- Albert Vann (1934–2022), American congressman from New York
- Albert Vanpoulle (born 1939), French field hockey player
- Albert Vanucci (born 1947), French footballer
- Albert C. Vaughn (1894–1951), American congressman from Pennsylvania
- Albert Jean Baptiste Marie Vayssière (1854–1942), French scientist, biologist, malacologist, and entomologist
- Albert Vecten (1926–2023), French farmer and politician
- Albert Vander Veer (1841–1929), American surgeon pioneer
- Albert Veera Chey (born 1982), French kickboxer
- Albert Veiel (1806–1874), German dermatologist
- Albert Venn (1867–1908), American lacrosse player
- Albert Verbrugghe (died 1963), Belgian crime victim
- Albert Jacques Verly (1815–1883), French commanding officer
- Albert Verrecchia, French-Italian keyboardist, composer, and record producer
- Albert Vërria (1936–2015), Albanian actor
- Albert Verwey (1865–1937), Dutch poet, translator, staffer, and literary historian
- Albert Henry Vestal (1875–1932), American lawyer and congressman from Indiana
- Albert Vete (born 1993), Tonga rugby league footballer
- Albert Viaplana (c. 1933–2014), Spanish architect and author
- Albert Viau (1910–2001), Canadian folksinger, composer, and music educator
- Albert Vicars (1840–1896), English architect
- Albert Vidalie (1913–1971), French writer, screenwriter, and songwriter
- Albert Vielfaure (1923–2007), Canadian politician from Manitoba
- Albert Viger (1843–1926), French politician
- Albert Vigna (1891–1970), Monegasque racing cyclist
- Albert Gautier Vignal (1854–1939), French-Monegasque nobleman and tycoon
- Albert Viksten (1889–1969), Swedish writer
- Albert Jansz Vinckenbrinck (1604–1665), Dutch sculptor
- Albert Virgili (born 1983), Spanish footballer
- Albert Visetti (1846–1928), Dalmatian musician
- Albert Vishnyakov (born 1983), Russian ice hockey player
- Albert Camille Vital (born 1952), Malagasy Army officer, politician, and civil engineer, Prime Minister of Madagascar (2009–2011)
- Albert Vitali (1955–2020), Swiss politician
- Albert Vivancos (born 1994), Spanish footballer
- Albert Vizentini, French violinist, composer, conductor, and writer
- Albert Vogel (1874–1933), Dutch officer, teacher, and performer
- Albert Vögler (1877–1945), German politician, industrialist, and entrepreneur
- Albert Voinea (born 1992), Romanian footballer
- Albert Vollrat (1903–1978), Estonian wrestler and football coach
- Albert Volz (1871–1971), American businessman and politician
- Albert von Barnekow (1809–1895), Prussian Army general
- Albert Gillis von Baumhauer (1891–1939), Dutch aviation pioneer
- Albert von Behaim (ca. 1180–1260), Roman papal legate
- Albert von Berrer (1857–1917), German Imperial German Army Generalleutnant
- Albert von Bezold (1836–1868), German physiologist
- Albert von Bülow (1829–1892), Prussian major general
- Albert von Einsiedel (1917–1999), Filipino sports shooter
- Albert von Ettingshausen (1850–1932), Austrian physicist
- Albert von Hellens (1879–1950), Finnish jurist and politician
- Albert von Julin (1846–1906), Finnish businessman
- Albert Lindsay von Julin (1871–1944), Finnish engineer, businessman, and vuorineuvos
- Albert von Keller (1844–1920), German painter
- Albert von Kersten (1889–1937), Austrian actor
- Albert von Kölliker (1817–1905), Swiss anatomist, physiologist, and histologist
- Albert von Le Coq (1860–1930), Prussian-German brewer, businessman and wine merchant
- Albert von Levetzow (1827–1903), German politician
- Albert von Maybach (1822–1904), German lawyer, politician, and railway manager
- Albert von Memerty (1814–1896), Prussian Imperial German Army general
- Albert von Mensdorff-Pouilly-Dietrichstein (1861–1945), Austro-Hungarian diplomat
- Albert Anton von Muchar (1786–1849), Austrian historian
- Albert von Pourtalès (1812–1861), Prussian diplomat
- Albert von Rauch (1829–1901), Prussian diplomat
- Albert von Sachsen (1934–2012), German politician and historian
- Albert von Sack (1757–1829), German explorer
- Albert von Schrenck-Notzing (1862–1929), German physician, psychiatrist, and researcher
- Albert von Stein, Swiss mercenary captain
- Albert von Thurn und Taxis (born 1983), German businessman and racing driver
- Albert Von Tilzer (1878–1956), American songwriter
- Albert Voorhies (1829–1913), American politician, Lieutenant Governor of Louisiana from 1865 to 1867
- Albert Voorn (born 1956), Dutch equestrian
- Albert O. Vorse Jr. (1914–1979), American United States Navy aviator and flying ace
- Albert Vorspan (1924–2019), American author
- Albert Vos (1886–unknown), Belgian sailor
- Albert Vrana (1921–1994), American sculptor
- Albert L. Vreeland (1901–1975), American congressman from New Jersey
- Albert Vulivuli (born 1985), Fijian rugby union player
- Albert Waalkens (1920–2007), Dutch farmer and art dealer
- Albert Luvian Wade (1884–1917), Scottish rugby union footballer
- Albert Wagelmans (born 1960), Dutch economist and professor
- Albert Wagner (1848–1898), German-American architect
- Albert Wagner (1899–2007), American United States Marine Corp veteran
- Albert C. Wagner (1911–1987), American agent, Director of the New Jersey Department of Corrections (1966–1973)
- Albert Wakefield (1921–2006), English footballer
- Albert Walder (born 1957), Italian cross-country skier
- Albert W. Waldron (1892–1961), American United States Army officer
- Albert H. Walenta (born 1943), German physicist and professor
- Albert Walker (1910–1993), English footballer
- Albert Walker (1910–2001), Canadian legislator from Ontario
- Albert Johnson Walker (born 1946), Canadian murderer known as "The Rolex Killer"
- Albert R. Walker (1881–1958), American architect
- Albert Shield Walker (1846–1915), American politician, blacksmith, Mayor of Springfield, Oregon in 1885
- Albert Joseph Wallace (1853–1939), American politician, Lieutenant Governor of California (1911–1915)
- Albert Gregory Waller (1890–1967), Irish flying ace
- Albert Walmsley (1885–1964), English footballer
- Albert Walmsley, Irish judge and politician
- Albert Walrath (1885–1926), American college football and basketball coach
- Albert Walsh (1877–1956), Australian rules footballer
- Albert Walsh (1900–1958), Canadian politician, Lieutenant Governor of Newfoundland from April to September 1949
- Albert D. Walton (1886–1951), American attorney
- Albert Edvard Wang (1864–1930), Danish painter
- Albert Warburton (1856–1925), English footballer
- Albert Ward (1865–1939), English cricketer
- Albert Ward (1870–1956), British screenwriter and film director
- Albert Ward (1896–1979), English cricketer
- Albert Wardell (born c. 1908), Welsh footballer
- Albert Warner (1884–1967), American cartoonist and one of the founders of Warner Bros.
- Albert Warner (1921–unknown), South African cricket umpire
- Albert Benjamin Washburn (1869–1942), American congressman from Iowa
- Albert Henry Washburn (1866–1930), American assistant attorney
- Albert Lincoln Washburn (1911–2007), American geomorphologist and skier
- Albert Wass (1908–1998), Hungarian nobleman, forest engineer, novelist, and poet
- Albert Wassell (1892–1975), English cricketer
- Albert Waterall (1890–1963), English footballer
- Albert Waters (1902–1985), English cricketer
- Albert Victor Waters (1896–1953), Canadian lawyer and politician
- Albert Durrant Watson (1859–1926), Canadian poet and physician
- Albert Watson (1828–1904), English college administrator
- Albert Watson (1857–1944), American jurist
- Albert Watson (1903–unknown), English footballer
- Albert Watson (1918–2009), English footballer
- Albert Watson (1922–1994), American congressman from South Carolina
- Albert Watson (born 1942), Scottish photographer
- Albert Watson (born 1985), Irish footballer
- Albert Watson II (1909–1993), American United States Army lieutenant general
- Albert Leisenring Watson (1876–1960), American United States district judge from Pennsylvania
- Albert Wattenberg (1917–2007), American physicist
- Albert Waugh (1902–1985), American economist and academic administrator
- Albert Way (1805–1874), English antiquary
- Albert J. Weatherhead Jr. (1892–1966), American college football player and coach
- Albert Weber (German footballer) (1888–1940), German footballer
- Albert J. Weber (1859–1925), American Supreme Court justice and chief justice from Utah
- Albert Webster (1920–2014), Australian rugby league footballer
- Albert Webster (1925–2010), British middle-distance runner
- Albert Falvey Webster (1848–1876), American author
- Albert Coady Wedemeyer (1896–1989), US Army commander who served in Asia during World War II, a principal commander of Operation Beleaguer
- Albert Clark Wedge (1834–1911), American physician and congressman from Minnesota
- Albert Weeks (1864–1948), Australian cricketer
- Albert Weiblen (1857–1957), German-American architect, sculptor, and businessman
- Albert Bythesea Weigall (1840–1912), English-Australian schoolmaster and headmaster
- Albert Weil (1880–1945), French sailor
- Albert Weiler (born 1965), German politician
- Albert Wein (1915–1991), American sculptor
- Albert Weinert (1863–1947), German-American sculptor
- Albert Weinstein (1885–1969), German long jumper
- Albert Weisbogel (1844–1919), American United States Navy sailor, two-time Medal of Honor recipient
- Albert Weisbord (1900–1977), American political activist and union organizer
- Albert Weisgerber (1878–1915), German painter
- Albert Weiss (1900–1981), American bridge player
- Albert Paul Weiss (1879–1931), German-American psychologist, theorist, scientist, and experimentalist
- Albert Welling (born 1952), British actor
- Albert R. Welsh (1860–1930), American senator from Florida
- Albert Welter (born 1952), American Buddhist scholar
- Albert Welti (1862–1912), Swiss painter and etcher
- Albert J. Welti (1894–1965), Swiss writer and painter
- Albert Wendt (born 1939), Samoan poet and writer
- Albert Wensley (1898–1970), English cricketer
- Albert Werkmüller (1879–1914), German track and field runner
- Albert Wessels (1908–1991), South African industrialist and businessman
- Albert West (1949–2015), Dutch singer and record producer
- Albert Benjamin West (1883–1929), American lawyer and congressman from Rhode Island
- Albert L. West (1825–1892), American architect, also known as A. L. West
- Albert Westcott (1870–1929), English cricketer
- Albert Western (1923–1987), Australian rules footballer
- Albert G. Wetherby (1833–1902), American malacologist and mineralogist
- Albert Wetton (1928–1996), English footballer
- Albert Buckman Wharton Jr. (1909–1963), American rancher and polo player
- Albert Buckman Wharton III, American rancher
- Albert D. Whealdon (1868–1963), American politician and educator
- Albert Wheeler (1915–1994), American professor and politician, Mayor of Ann Arbor, Michigan from 1975 to 1978
- Albert Whelan (1875–1961), Australian singer and entertainer
- Albert White (1889–1965), English cricketer
- Albert White (1890–1965), British cyclist
- Albert White (1892–1917), English British Army sergeant, Victoria Cross recipient
- Albert White (1895–1982), American diver
- Albert White (born 1942), American blues guitarist, singer, and songwriter
- Albert White (born 1977), American basketball player
- Albert B. White (1856–1941), American politician, Governor of West Virginia (1901–1905)
- Albert Scott White (1855–1931), Canadian lawyer, politician, and judge from New Brunswick
- Albert Smith White (1803–1864), American congressman and District Court district judge from Indiana
- Albert White Hat (1938–2013), Lakota teacher, translator, and activist
- Albert Whitehurst (1898–1976), English footballer
- Albert H. Whitfield (1849–1918), American Supreme Court justice from Mississippi
- Albert Whitford (1877–1924), English tailor and politician
- Albert Whitford (1905–2002), American physicist and astronomer
- Albert Whiting (cricketer) (1866–1946), Australian cricketer
- Albert N. Whiting (1917–2020), American academic administrator
- Albert Whitlock (1915–1999), British matte artist
- Albert Eugene Whitmore (1876–1949), Canadian merchant, rancher, and political figure
- Albert Wurts Whitney (1870–1943), American statistician and actuarial scientist
- Albert Whittle (1877–1917), English cricketer
- Albert Widdowson (1864–1938), English cricketer
- Albert Widmann (1912–1986), German SS officer and chemist
- Albert Wiesener (1902–1986), Norwegian lawyer
- Albert Wigand (1821–1886), German botanist and pharmacologist
- Albert Wigand (1882–1932), German science professor and scientist
- Albert E. Wiggam (1871–1957), American psychologist and eugenicist
- Albert H. Wiggin (1868–1951), American banker
- Albert Wiggins (1935–2011), American swimmer
- Albert Wijuk Kojałowicz (1609–1677), Lithuanian historian, theologian, and translator
- Albert Wilansky (1921–2017), Canadian-American mathematician
- Albert Spencer Wilcox (1844–1919), Hawaiian businessman and politician
- Albert J. Wilke (1895–1977), American senator from Michigan
- Albert H. Wilkening (1946–2020), American United States Air National Guard major general
- Albert Wilkes (1875–1936), English sports photographer and footballer
- Albert Wilkins (1908–1970), South African cricketer
- Albert Wilkinson (1928–2011), English footballer
- Albert Willecomme (1900–1971), French photographer
- Albert Willemetz (1887–1964), French librettist
- Albert Willetts (1900–1979), New Zealand yacht designer, builder, and racer
- Albert C. Willford (1877–1937), American congressman from Iowa
- Albert Williams (1927–2007), British trade unionist
- Albert Williams (born 1954), Nicaraguan major league baseball pitcher
- Albert Williams (born 1964), American Canadian football player and American football player
- Albert Henry Wilmot Williams (1832–1919), British Army officer and courtier
- Albert Cecil Williams (1929–2024), American pastor, civil and LGBT rights activist, community leader, and author
- Albert Lawrence Williams Jr. (born 1934), American football player and coach, also known as A. L. Williams
- Albert Lynn Williams (1911–1982), American business executive
- Albert Rhys Williams (1883–1962), American journalist, labor organizer, and publicist
- Albert Smiley Williams (1849–1924), American politician, Mayor of Nashville, Tennessee from 1904 to 1906
- Albert Williamson (1866–unknown), English footballer
- Albert Willimsky (1890–1940), German Roman Catholic priest
- Albert Willis (1876–1954), Australian politician
- Albert S. Willis (1843–1897), American congressman and Ambassador to Hawaii from 1893 to 1897
- Albert Potter Wills (1873–1937), American physicist
- Albert Edward Wilshire (1863–1935), English organist and composer
- Albert Wilson (1878–unknown), Australian politician
- Albert Wilson (1903–1996), American botanist, landscape architect, author, teacher, television personality, and radio talk show host
- Albert Wilson (1915–1998), English footballer
- Albert Wilson (born 1992), American football player
- Albert E. Wilson (c. 1813–1861), American pioneer and merchant
- Albert George Wilson (1918–2012), American astronomer
- Albert Windisch (1878–1967), German painter, professor, and typographer
- Albert J. Winegar (1868–1935), American mechanical engineer and congressman from Wisconsin
- Albert Winfield (1868–1932), British trade unionist and politician
- Albert Wingert (1897–1962), Luxembourgish teacher and war protestor
- Albert J. Winkler (1894–1989), American professor
- Albert Winsemius (1910–1996), Dutch economist
- Albert Edward Winship (1845–1933), American educator and journalist
- Albert G. Winterhalter (1856–1920), American Navy admiral
- Albert Wirsching (1920–1997), German footballer
- Albert Wise (1884–1964), English football goalkeeper
- Albert W. Wishard (c. 1854–1917), American congressman and attorney
- Albert "Al" Witcher (born 1936), American football player
- Albert Wittmer (1896–1950), American college football and basketball player and coach, lawyer, and congressman from Pennsylvania
- Albert Wodrig (1883–1972), German Army general
- Albert Wohlsen (1919–2004), American businessman and politician, Interim Mayor of Lancaster, Pennsylvania from 1979 to 1980
- Albert Wohlstetter (1913–1997), American political scientist
- Albert B. Wolfe (1876–1967), American economist
- Albert Wolff (1814–1892), German sculptor and medalist
- Albert Wolff (1825–1891), French writer, dramatist, journalist, and art critic
- Albert Wolff (1884–1970), French conductor and composer
- Albert Wolff (1899–1977), Australian Chief Justice of the Supreme Court of Western Australia
- Albert Wolff (1906–1989), French-born American fencer
- Albert Moritz Wolff (1854–1923), German sculptor and medalist
- Albert Wolfgang (1689–1734), German Imperial Army general
- Albert Charles Wollenberg (1900–1981), American district judge from California
- Albert Woller (1861–unknown), American insurance agent, real estate agent, and congressman from Wisconsin
- Albert F. Woller (1886–1944), German-American machinist, auto mechanic, and politician
- Albert Wolsky (born 1930), American costume designer
- Albert Wolstencroft (1898–1984), English footballer
- Albert M. Wolters (born 1942), Canadian professor
- Albert William Wolters (1883–1961), British psychologist
- Albert Wood (1903–1965), English footballer
- Albert Wood, English rugby union footballer
- Albert Beaumont Wood (1890–1964), British physicist
- Albert E. Wood (1873/1974–1941), British barrister
- Albert Woodbury (1909–1989), American composer and orchestrator
- Albert Woodland (1895–1955), English cricketer
- Albert Woods (1816–1904), English officer of arms
- Albert Woods, English footballer
- Albert Woodworth (1843–1908), American businessman and congressman from New Hampshire
- Albert Woolley (1871–1896), English footballer
- Albert Woolley (1902–1978), English cricketer
- Albert Woolson (1850–1956), American Union Army Drummer Boy; last known surviving member of the Union Army who served in the American Civil War
- Albert Worgan (1871–unknown), English footballer
- Albert Worrall, English rugby league footballer
- Albert Worth (1888–1971), English footballer
- Albert Worthy (1905–1978), English footballer
- Albert Woyciechowski (1868–1899), German-American railroad employee and congressman from Wisconsin
- Albert Wratislaw (1822–1892), English clergyman and Slavonic scholar
- Albert A. Wray (1858–1924), American lawyer and politician from New York
- Albert Wren (1916–1961), Canadian legislator from Ontario
- Albert Wright (1875–1938), Australian cricketer and pitch curator
- Albert Wright (1899–1987), English cricketer
- Albert Wright (1902–1984), English cricketer
- Albert Wright (born 1941), English cricketer
- Albert D. Wright (1842–1926), American Union Army soldier and Medal of Honor recipient
- Albert Hazen Wright (1879–1970), American herpetologist and professor
- Albert Wurzer, German bobsledder
- Albert Wyckmans (1897–1995), Belgian cyclist
- Albert Capwell Wyckoff (1903–1953), American minister and writer
- Albert Wynn (born 1951), American lobbyist and congressman from Maryland
- Albert Xavery (baptized 1664–c. 1728), Flemish sculptor
- Albert Yagüe (born 1985), Spanish footballer
- Albert Yarullin (born 1993), Russian ice hockey player
- Albert C. Yates (born 1942), American academic administrator
- Albert Yator (1993–2011), Kenyan long-distance runner
- Albert Yava (1888–1980), Hopi-Tewa autobiographer and interpreter
- Albert Yavuryan (1935–2007), Armenian film producer
- Albert F. Yeager (1892–1961), American horticulturalist
- Albert Yeates (1860–1941), Australian pastoralist and businessman
- Albert Yee, Korean-American educational psychologist
- Albert Edward Ismail Yelda (born 1959), Iraqi politician
- Albert Yeung (born 1943), Hong Kong businessman
- Albert Yobo (born 1979), Nigerian footballer
- Albert York (1928–2009), American painter
- Albert Yorke (1867–1904), British diplomat and politician
- Albert Young (1877–1940), American welterweight boxer
- Albert Young (1917–2013), Welsh footballer
- Albert Young (born 1962), Taiwanese writer and poet
- Albert Young (born 1985), American football player
- Albert Yuma Mulimbi (born 1955), Congolese businessman and economist
- Albert Zachary (1914–2006), American major league baseball pitcher
- Albert Zafy (1927–2017), Malagasy politician and educator, President of Madagascar from 1993 to 1996
- Albert Francis Zahm (1862–1954), American aeronautical experimenter and physician
- Albert Zahn, Prussian sculptor
- Albert Żamett (1821–1876), Polish-Russian painter
- Albert Zander (1864–1897), German engineer, photographer, and entrepreneur
- Albert Favre Zanuti, Swiss-Italian watchmaker and entrepreneur
- Albert C. Zapanta (born 1941), American businessman and trade ambassador
- Albert Zerkowitz (1905–1964) Austria-Hungarian entomologist
- Albert Ziegler (1927–2022), Swiss Roman-Catholic theologian, ethicist, and author
- Albert Ziegler (born 1961), German psychologist
- Albert Kwasi Zigah (born 1959), Ghanaian politician
- Albert Zimmermann (1808–1888), German painter
- Albert Zirkel (1884–1945), American lightweight wrestler
- Albert Lindsey Zobrist (born 1942), American computer scientist, games researcher, and inventor
- Albert Zoer (born 1975), Dutch show jumper, horse breeder, and businessman
- Albert Zohmingmawia (born 1991), Indian footballer
- Albert Zoller, French military officer
- Albert Zomaya, Australian computer engineer and educator
- Albert Zugsmith (1910–1993), American film producer, director, and screenwriter
- Albert Zürner (1890–1920), German diver
- Albert Rudolph Zuroweste (1901–1987), American Roman Catholic prelate
- Albert Zwar (1863–1935), Australian politician
- Albert Zwaveling (1927–2023), Dutch surgeon
- Albert Zweifel (born 1949), Swiss cyclo-cross cyclist

=== Fictional characters ===
- Albert, titular character in the Swedish comedy series Albert & Herbert
- Albert, titular character in the American video game Albert & Otto
- Albert "Al", a character in Veronica Roth's Divergent
- Albert Angelo, titular character in the English novel Albert Angelo
- Albert Arkwright, a character in British sitcom Open All Hours
- Albert Campion, character in a series of detective novels and short stories written by Margery Allingham
- Albert Davies, a character in the British soap opera EastEnders
- Albert Heinrich, a.k.a. Cyborg 004, a character in the manga series Cyborg 009
- "Fat" Albert Robertson, lead character in the animated series Fat Albert and the Cosby Kids
- Albert Steptoe, one of the lead characters in British sitcom Steptoe and Son
- Albert Tatlock, a character in British soap opera Coronation Street
- Albert Trotter, a character in British sitcom Only Fools and Horses
- Albert Volpe, a character in the American film series The Godfather
- Albert Wesker, a villain and high ranking commander of Umbrella Corps in the Japanese video game series Resident Evil
- Albert W. Wily, a villain in the video game series Mega Man

== See also ==
- Albertus (given name)
- Albertet, an Occitan diminutive of Albert
- Albrecht
- Elbert (disambiguation)
- Albert I (disambiguation)
- Albert II (disambiguation)
- Albert III (disambiguation)
- Albert IV (disambiguation)
- Albie (given name)
- Alby (disambiguation)
