= Albertina (given name) =

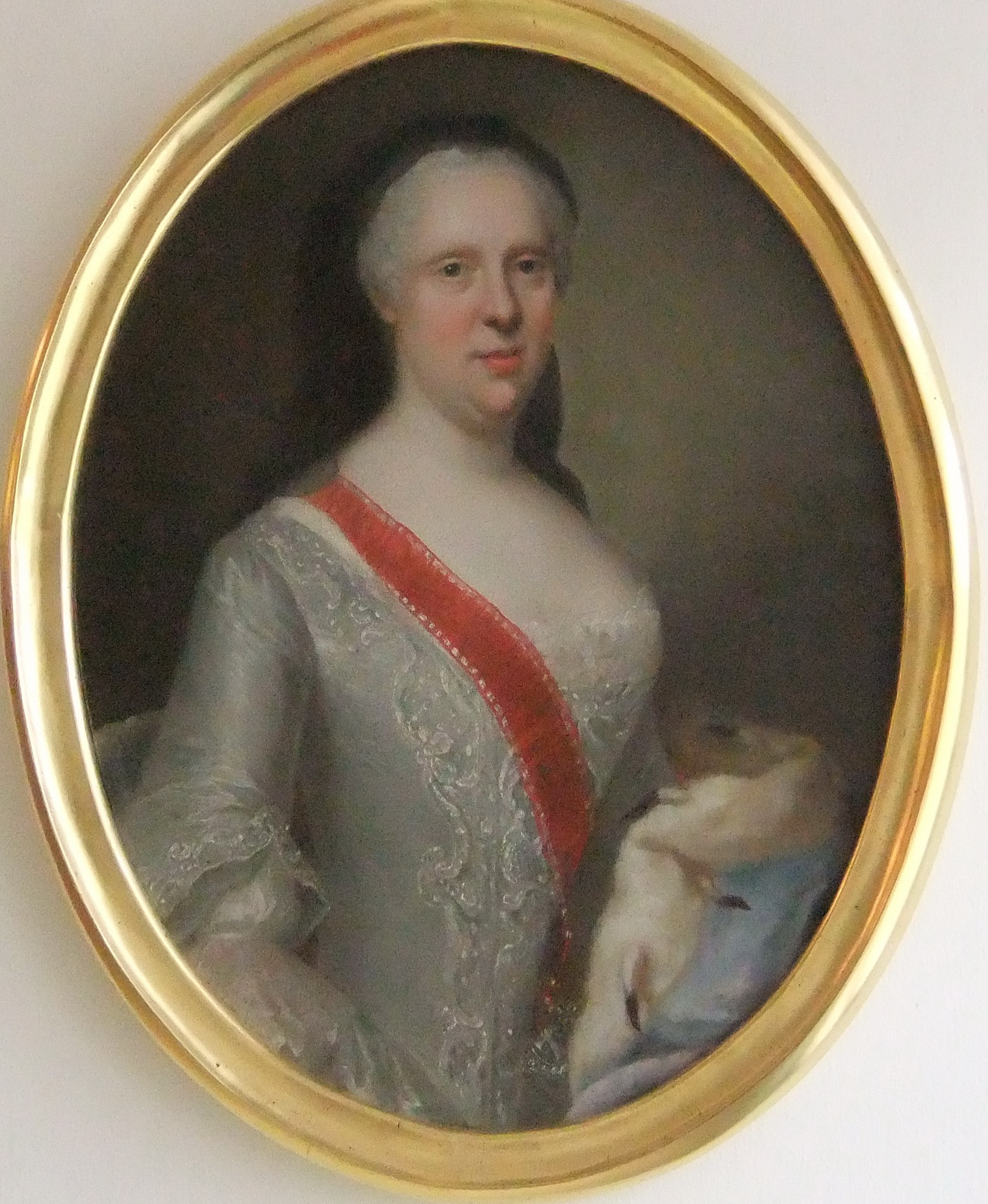
- Princess Albertina Frederica of Baden-Durlach
- Gender: Feminine

Other gender
- Masculine: Albert

Origin
- Language: Germanic
- Meaning: Noble and bright

Other names
- Related names: Alberta, Alberte, Albertine

Albertina is a feminine given name and a diminutive of Alberta, the feminine form of Albert. It originates from the Germanic elements adal ("noble") and beraht ("bright").

== Notable people ==
- Princess Albertina Frederica of Baden-Durlach (1682–1755), German princess
- Sophia Albertina, Abbess of Quedlinburg (1753–1829), Swedish princess and last Princess-Abbess of Quedlinburg
- Albertina Almeida (born 1966), Indian lawyer and human rights activist
- Albertina Berkenbrock (1919–1931), Brazilian girl beatified by the Roman Catholic Church
- Albertina Carlsson (1848–1930), Swedish zoologist
- Albertina Carri (born 1973), Argentine filmmaker
- Albertina Dias (born 1965), Portuguese runner
- Albertina Francis (born 1995), Nigerian volleyball player
- Albertína Friðbjörg Elíasdóttir (born 1980), Icelandic politician
- Albertina Ho (born 1980), Indonesian judge
- Albertina Ivanova (born 1954), Mari poet
- Albertina Johannes, Namibian sprinter
- Albertina Kassoma (born 1996), Angolan handball player
- Albertina Kerr (1890–1911), American philanthropist
- Albertina Luthuli (born 1932), South African politician and medical doctor
- Albertina Machado (born 1961), Portuguese long-distance runner
- Albertina "Tina" Majorino (born 1985), American actress
- Albertina Martínez Burgos (1981–2019), Chilean photojournalist
- Albertina Noyes (born 1949), American figure skater
- Albertina Ramírez (1898–1979), Nicaraguan Roman Catholic nun and mystic
- Albertina Rasch (1891–1967), Austrian-American dancer and choreographer
- Albertina Sisulu (1918–2011), South African anti-apartheid activist
- Albertina Soepboer (born 1969), Dutch writer
- Albertina Walker (1929–2010), American gospel singer, songwriter and humanitarian

== See also ==
- , including other people with the first name
- Albertina (disambiguation)
