= Alberta (given name) =

- Gender: Feminine

Other gender
- Masculine: Albert

Origin
- Language: Old High German
- Derivation: adal + beraht
- Meaning: Noble and bright

Other names
- Variant forms: Alberte, Albertina, Albertine, Albertyna
- Pet names: Bertie, Birdie
- Related names: Bertina

Alberta is a feminine given name derived from the masculine name Albert. It originates from the Old High German elements adal ("noble") and beraht ("bright"). The first element is cognate with the Old English æþele ("noble"), from which the given name Ethel is derived.

== Variants ==
- Alberta (Albanian, Catalan, Dutch, English, German, Italian, Lithuanian, Polish, Portuguese, Spanish)
- Alberte (Danish, French)
- Albertina (Italian, Lithuanian, Portuguese, Spanish)
- Albertine (Dutch, French, German)
- Albertyna (Polish, Ukrainian)

== Notable people named Alberta ==
- Princess Louise Caroline Alberta (1848–1939), daughter of Queen Victoria and namesake of the Canadian province
- Alberta of Agen (died 286), Roman martyr
- Alberta, Queen of Castile (fl. 1071), wife of Sancho II
- Alberta Adams (1917–2014), American blues singer
- Alberta Ampomah (born 1994), Ghanaian weightlifter
- Alberta Anderson, American politician
- Alberta Bigagli (1928–2017), Italian psychologist and poet
- Alberta Brianti (born 1980), Italian tennis player
- Alberta Cariño (died 2010), Mexican human rights defender
- Alberta Jeannette Cassell (1926–2007), American architect and children's book author
- Alberta Cleland (1876–1960), Canadian painter and educator
- Alberta Darling (born 1944), American educator and politician
- Alberta Gallatin (1861–1948), American stage and film actress
- Alberta Gay (1913–1987), mother of singer Marvin Gaye
- Alberta Pierson Hannum (1906–1985), American author
- Alberta Hunter (1895–1984), American jazz singer and songwriter
- Alberta Martin (1906–2004), once thought to have been the last surviving widow of a Confederate soldier
- Alberta Moore Smith (c. 1875–1957), American writer and clubwoman, also known as Albreta Moore Smith and Alberta Covington
- Alberta Johanna Meijer-Smetz (1893–1953), Dutch painter
- Alberta Jones Seaton (1924–2014), American zoologist
- Alberta Odell Jones (1930–1965), American attorney and civil rights icon
- Alberta Kinsey (1875–1952), American painter
- Alberta Lee (1860–1928), American stage and film actress
- Alberta Masiello (1915–1990), Italian-American conductor and opera singer
- Alberta Mayne (born 1980), Canadian actress, theatre producer, and social activist
- Alberta Mennega (1912–2009), Dutch botanist
- Alberta Montagu, Countess of Sandwich (1877–1951), American heiress and British aristocrat
- Alberta Neiswanger Hall (1870–1956), American composer and children's book author
- Alberta Nelson (1937–2006), American television and film actress
- Alberta Nichols (1898–1957), American songwriter
- Alberta Pfeiffer (1899–1994), American architect
- Alberta Sackey (born 1972), Ghanaian footballer
- Alberta Santuccio (born 1994), Italian fencer
- Alberta Virginia Scott (c. 1875–1902), American educator
- Alberta Schenck Adams (1928–2009), American civil rights activist
- Alberta Sheriff (fl. 1998–1999), also known as Alberta, a singer from Sierra Leone
- Alberta Slim (1910–2005), Canadian country singer
- Alberta Tinsley-Talabi (born 1954), American politician
- Alberta Banner Turner (1909–2008), American professor and psychologist
- Alberta Uitangcoy-Santos (1867–1953), Filipino women's rights activist
- Alberta Vaughn (1904–1992), American silent film actress
- Alberta Watson (1955–2015), Canadian film and television actress
- Alberta Whittle (born 1980), Barbadian-Scottish artist
- Alberta Williams King (1904–1974), mother of Martin Luther King Jr.
- Alberta Zanardi (born 1940), Italian sprint canoer

== See also ==
- Albert (given name)
- Albert (surname)
- Alberta (disambiguation)
