= Birdy =

Birdy or Birdie may refer to:

== Places in the United States ==
- Birdie, Georgia, an unincorporated community
- Birdie, Mississippi, an unincorporated community

== People with the name ==
- Birdie (given name)
- Birdy (singer) (born 1996), the stage name of English singer-songwriter Jasmine van den Bogaerde
- Eliza Sophia Robertson Johnson (1868–1926), nicknamed "Birdie", American political activist
- Henry Robertson Bowers (1883–1912), nicknamed "Birdie", participant in Robert Falcon Scott's doomed race to the South Pole
- Byrd Spilman Dewey (1856–1942), nicknamed "Birdie", American author and land investor
- Birdy Sweeney (1931–1999), Irish actor and comedian
- Jack Ward (c. 1553–1622), nicknamed "Birdy", notorious English pirate and Barbary Corsair
- Birdy, pseudonym of a former guitarist of the glam punk band Trashcan Darlings

== Arts and entertainment ==
=== Fictional characters ===
- Birdie (Street Fighter), in Capcom's video games
- Betty Draper, on Mad Men, whom Don Draper affectionately refers to as "Birdie"
- Birdie the Early Bird, the first identifiably female McDonaldland character
- Birdy (character), a Marvel Comics villain
- Birdy, in the Conker platform video game series
- Birdy, also known as Torii, a robotic pet in Gundam SEED and Gundam SEED Destiny
- Birdy, the title character of Birdy the Mighty, a Japanese manga series
- Wang Po-Te in Your Name Engraved Herein goes by the name Birdy, named after the character in the movie of the same name
- Birdie Anders, the younger sister of the Anders family in the Six Minutes podcast

=== Music ===
- Birdy (Birdy album) (2011)
- Birdy (Peter Gabriel album), 1985 soundtrack of the film Birdy
- Birdy, an album by Bloodthirsty Butchers
- "Birdie", a song by Avril Lavigne from the album Head Above Water
- "Birdy", a song by British Sea Power from the single "Remember Me"

=== Other ===
- Birdie (novel), by Tracey Lindberg
- Birdy (novel), by William Wharton
- Birdie (film), starring Maeve Dermody and Sam Parsonson, and directed by Shelly Lauman
- Birdy (film), starring Matthew Modine and Nicolas Cage, and directed by Alan Parker, based on Wharton's novel

== Brands and enterprises ==
- Birdy (bicycle), a folding bicycle
- Birdy Airlines (2002–2004), a defunct airline based in Belgium

== Sports ==
- Birdie (golf), a score of one under par on a hole in golf
- A gun dog that gets excited by birds
- Shuttlecock, in badminton

== Other uses ==
- Birdie, the common nickname for a small parabolic aluminized reflector light
- Birdy, unwanted artifacts that occur in noise reduction or in "frequency mixing".
- BIRDIE, Martin AN/GSG-5 Battery Integration and Radar Display Equipment
