= Bertina =

Bertina (or Bertine) is a feminine given name. It may also be found as a nickname, or as a surname.

== People ==
- Bertina Foltz (1897–1940), American writer, associate editor of Vogue
- Bertina Henrichs (born 1966), German writer
- Bertina Lopes (1924– 2012), Mozambican-Italian artist
- Bertine Zetlitz (born 1975), Norwegian pop singer

== Other uses ==
- Bonomi BS.9 Bertina, an experimental glider built in Italy in the 1930s
- Bertina, an Iranian web search service

== See also ==
- Albertina (given name)
- Albertine (given name)
- Bettina
- Bertha
- Burtina (a genus of moth)
