= Albertina (disambiguation) =

The Albertina is a museum in Vienna, Austria.

Albertina may also refer to:

== People ==
Albertina (given name), includes list of name-holders

== Places ==
- Albertina, Minas Gerais, a town in Brazil
- Albertina, Western Cape, a town in South Africa's Western Cape province

== Libraries ==
- Albertina, a nickname for the Royal Library of Belgium
- Bibliotheca Albertina, the Leipzig University Library

== Schools ==
- Accademia Albertina, art school in Turin, Italy
- University of Freiburg, Albert Ludwig University of Freiburg before the year 1820
- University of Königsberg, or Königsberg Albertus University, the former University in East Prussia

== See also ==
- Albertine (disambiguation)
- Alberta (disambiguation)
