= Albertinus =

Albertinus may refer to:

- Albertinus de Virga, 15th-century Venetian cartographer
- Phyllonorycter albertinus, a moth of the family Gracillariidae

== See also ==
- Albertine (disambiguation)
- Albertus (given name)
