= Santo Antônio do Jardim =

- Municipality
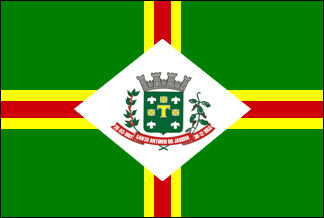
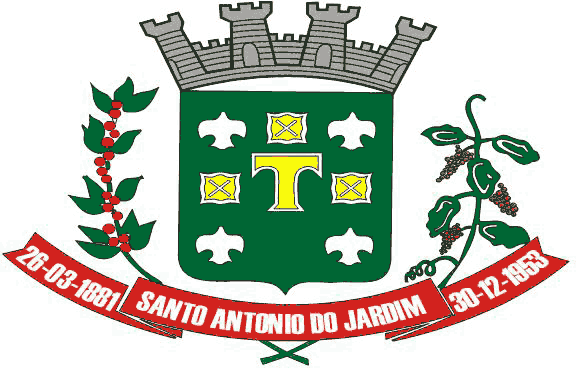
- Flag Coat of arms

- Location in São Paulo state

- Location in Brazil
- Coordinates: 22°6′53″S 46°41′1″W
- Country: Brazil
- Region: Southeast Brazil
- State: São Paulo

Area
  - Total: 109.96 km^{2} (42.46 sq mi)

Population (2020)
  - Total: 5,940
  - Density: 54.0/km^{2} (140/sq mi)
- Time zone: UTC−3 (BRT)
- Website: www.stoantoniojardim.sp.gov.br

Santo Antônio do Jardim (Portuguese meaning "Saint Anthony of the garden") is a municipality in the eastern part of the state of São Paulo in Brazil. The population is 5,940 (2020 est.) in an area of 109.96 km^{2}. The elevation is 850 m.

== Geography ==
Santo Antônio do Jardim is located north of the state capital named São Paulo and east-northeast of Campinas. The state of Minas Gerais is bounded to the east.

=== Neighboring municipalities ===
- Albertina, Minas Gerais
- Andradas
- Espírito Santo do Pinhal
- São João da Boa Vista

== Media ==
In telecommunications, the city was served by Telecomunicações de São Paulo. In July 1998, this company was acquired by Telefónica, which adopted the Vivo brand in 2012. The company is currently an operator of cell phones, fixed lines, internet (fiber optics/4G) and television (satellite and cable).

== See also ==
- List of municipalities in São Paulo
