= List of shipwrecks in November 1883 =

The list of shipwrecks in November 1883 includes ships sunk, foundered, grounded, or otherwise lost during November 1883.

== 1 November ==
List of shipwrecks: 1 November 1883
Ship	State	Description
Kingaloch	United Kingdom	The ship departed from Fowey, Cornwall for Blyth, Northumberland. No further trace, reported missing.
Shooting Star	United Kingdom	The Mersey Flat collided with the steamship Merchant (United Kingdom) and sank in the River Mersey.

== 3 November ==
List of shipwrecks: 3 November 1883
Ship	State	Description
Duguesclin	United Kingdom	The ship departed from Aberdeen for Nairn. No further trace, reported missing.

== 4 November ==
List of shipwrecks: 4 November 1883
Ship	State	Description
Sarah M. Smith	Flag unknown	The barque was sighted by the steamer Plantyn (Belgium) abandoned in the Atlantic Ocean off Long Island, New York, at 40°34′N 72°34′W.

== 5 November ==
List of shipwrecks: 5 November 1883
Ship	State	Description
Eunomia	United Kingdom	The ship was wrecked on the Mull of Galloway, Wigtownshire with the loss of four of her twelve crew. She was on a voyage from Lamlash, Isle of Arran to Demerara, British Guiana.

== 6 November ==
List of shipwrecks: 6 November 1883
Ship	State	Description
Iris	United Kingdom	The steamship struck rocks off Cape Villano, Spain and sank with the loss of 35 of her 36 crew. She was on a voyuage from Cardiff, Glamorgan to Port Said, Egypt.
Thankful	United Kingdom	The brig sank off Southwold, Suffolk. Her crew were rescued by a fishing smack.

== 7 November ==
List of shipwrecks: 7 November 1883
Ship	State	Description
Burslem	United Kingdom	The steamship ran aground in the River Ouse. She was on a voyage from Goole, Yorkshire to Calais, France.
Modina	United Kingdom	The steamship was wrecked on the Manacles Rock, Cornwall. She was on a voyage from Newport, Monmouthshire to Devoran, Cornwall.

== 10 November ==
List of shipwrecks: 10 November 1883
Ship	State	Description
Iris	United Kingdom	The steamship was wrecked off the coast of Galicia, Spain with the loss of 35 of her crew.
Mary Ann	United Kingdom	The smack collided with the smack Velox (United Kingdom) and sank in the North Sea with the loss of four of her five crew. The survivor was rescued by Velox.
Ramsey	United Kingdom	The ship was wrecked on the Elizabeth Reef, 400 nautical miles (740 km) off the Australian coast, with some loss of life. She was on a voyage from London to Brisbane, Queensland.
Saint Paul	United States	The steamship caught fire at De Tour, Michigan and was scuttled in 13 feet (4.0 m) of water. She was refloated on 13 November.
Trinidad	United Kingdom	The ship de[arted from Batavia, Netherlands East Indies for the English Channel. No further trace, reported overdue.

== 11 November ==
List of shipwrecks: 11 November 1883
Ship	State	Description
Arab	United States	The schooner capsized and sank in Lake Michigan about 25 nautical miles (46 km) off Racine, Wisconsin (42°38.70′N 087°47.49′W) with the loss of one of her nine crew. Survivors were rescued by the tug Protection (United States), which was towing her from St. Joseph, Michigan to Milwaukee, Wisconsin.
Ashtabula	United States	The schooner capsized and sank in Lake Michigan off Milwaukee (43°04.200′N 087°48.139′W). Her four crew abandoned ship in a yawl and were rescued by the tug Starke Brothers (United States). Ashtabula was on a voyage from Chicago, Illinois, to Escanaba, Michigan.
Hollandia	Netherlands	The steamship was run into by the steamship John Ormston (United Kingdom) in the River Thames and was beached at Blackwall, Middlesex, United Kingdom. Hollandia was on a voyage from Harlingen, Friesland to London, United Kingdom.
J. N. Carter	Canada	The schooner was driven ashore 2 nautical miles (3.7 km) south of Kincardine, Ontario, Canada. She was refloated in Spring 1884, repaired, and returned to service.
Paola	Italy	The brig was wrecked on the Vada Banks, in the Mediterranean Sea off Livorno with some loss of life.

== 12 November ==
List of shipwrecks: 12 November 1883
Ship	State	Description
Arab	United States	The schooner foundered in Lake Huron with the loss of one of her nine crew.
Etoile	France	The ship departed from Swansea, Glamorgan, United Kingdom for Cette, Hérault. No further trace, reported missinhg.
Hattie Chester	United States	The schooner left Gloucester, Massachusetts on 7 November for the Georges Bank, probably lost in the gale on 12 November with all fourteen crew.
Nahar	Austria-Hungary	The barque was run into by the steamship Duke of Argyll (United Kingdom) and sank in the Crosby Channel with the loss of her pilot. Her crew were rescued by the tug Columbus (United Kingdom).
Nellie	United States	The steamship was wrecked in Lake Winnipeg with the loss of several lives.
Rutherford B. Hayes	United States	The fishing schooner sank in a gale on the Georges Bank, last seen the day before. Lost with all twelve crew.
Sultana	United States	The fishing schooner left Gloucester, Massachusetts on 19 October and vanished, probably lost on 12 November on the Georges Bank in a gale with the loss of all fourteen crew.
Witchcraft	United States	The fishing schooner sank in a gale on the Georges Bank, last seen the day before. Lost with all eleven crew.
Five unnamed vessels	United States	The fishing vessels capsized in Chesapeake Bay with the loss of 30 lives.
Three unnamed vessels	United Kingdom	The coal barges were wrecked in Long Island Sound with the loss of eight lives.
20 unnamed vessels	United States	The schooners were wrecked on the American coast. Their crews were rescued.

== 13 November ==
List of shipwrecks: 13 November 1883
Ship	State	Description
H. C. Ackley	United States	The steam barge suffered engine and steering problems in a severe gale after encountering and taking under tow the tug Protection (United States), which also was in distress. H. C. Ackley sank in Lake Michigan in 20 fathoms (120 ft; 37 m) of water 15 nautical miles (28 km) off Holland, Michigan, with the loss of her captain and five other crew members. The schooner Driver (United States) rescued the other twelve members of her crew.

== 14 November ==
List of shipwrecks: 14 November 1883
Ship	State	Description
Protection	United States	After departing St. Joseph, Michigan, on 10 November, the tug got into trouble in a severe gale on Lake Michigan while towing the schooner Arab (United States) to Milwaukee, Wisconsin. Protection cut Arab loose to try to save herself, and Arab sank on 11 November with the loss of one life, Protection rescuing the other eight men on board. Protection then was taken under tow by the steam barge H. C. Ackley (United States), but soon H. C. Ackley got into trouble and cut her loose. Protection eventually grounded 1 mile (1.6 km) south of the harbor at Saugatuck, Michigan, on 14 November with the loss of one life after dragging her anchor. The United States Life-Saving Service crew from St. Joseph and local people helped the other four members of Protection′s crew and the eight survivors of Arab get ashore safely.
Unnamed	Flag unknown	The schooner was wrecked at Port Rowan, Ontario, Canada with the loss of all eight hands.

== 15 November ==
List of shipwrecks: 15 November 1883
Ship	State	Description
Galatea, and St. Andrew's Castle	United Kingdom	The barques collided in the Atlantic Ocean and both vessels sank. Their crew were rescued by the full-rigged ship Emma C. (Italy). Galatea was on a voyage from Hull, Yorkshire to the River Plate. St. Andrew's Castle was on a voyage from Middlesbrough, Yorkshire to the River Plate
Grecian	United Kingdom	The barque was abandoned, sinking, in mid-Atlantic, after developing a leak in heavy gales on voyage from Philadelphia, United States, to Porto, Portugal, with grain; all crew were rescued by American ship MARTHA COBB.

== 16 November ==
List of shipwrecks: 16 November 1883
Ship	State	Description
Algoma	United Kingdom	The ship caught fire at Penarth, Glamorgan. The fire was extinguished.
C. W. Anderson	Canada	The ship was abandoned in the Atlantic Ocean. Her crew were rescued by the steamship Carmona (United Kingdom). C. W. Anderson was on a voyage from Halifax, Nova Scotia to Puerto Rico.
Manistee	United States	The cargo liner broke up and sank in a severe gale in Lake Superior with the loss of between 23 and 30 lives. Wreckage was found on shore scattered between Ontonagon, Michigan and Keweenaw Point.

== 17 November ==
List of shipwrecks: 17 November 1883
Ship	State	Description
Alberta	United States	The steamship was destroyed by fire with the loss of one life.
Par Excellent	United Kingdom	The pilot cutter foundered in the Bristol Channel off Barry Island, Glamorgan. Her crew were rescued.
Four unnamed vessels	United States	A tug and three barges were destroyed by fire at Philadelphia, Pennsylvania.

== 18 November ==
List of shipwrecks: 18 November 1883
Ship	State	Description
Condor	United Kingdom	The steamship struck the pier at IJmuiden, North Holland, Netherlands and sank with the loss of eighteen of her 27 crew. She was on a voyage from Liverpool, Lancashire to Amsterdam, North Holland.
Dei Gratia	Norway	The barque was abandoned in the Atlantic Ocean. Her crew were rescued by Kate Covert (United Kingdom). Dei Gratia was on a voyage from Quebec City, Canada to Liverpool.
Hymettus	United Kingdom	The steamship was driven ashore on the coast of South Holland, Netherlands. Some of her crew were rescued by the 's-Gravenzande Lifeboat. She was on a voyage from Rotterdam, South Holland to Bilbao, Spain.
Labrador	France	The schooner was driven ashore and wrecked in the West Voe of Sumburgh. Her crew were rescued.
Yan Pan	United Kingdom	The steamship sank at Burntisland, Fife.
Salvatore	Italy	The ship was destroyed by fire off Carboneras, Spain. Her crew were rescued. She was on a voyage from Marseille, Bouches-du-Rhône, France to Senegal.

== 19 November ==
List of shipwrecks: 19 November 1883
Ship	State	Description
Bacalieu	United Kingdom	The ship departed from Dublin for Antwerp, Belgium. No further trace, reported overdue.
Iolani	Spain	The steamship was wrecked on Panagatan Island, Spanish East Indies. Some of her passengers and crew were reported missing. She was on a voyage from Iloilo to Manila.

== 20 November ==
List of shipwrecks: 20 November 1883
Ship	State	Description
Blaenavon	United Kingdom	The steamship collided with the steamship Crown of Arragon (United Kingdom) and sank in the Clyde. Her crew survived. Blaenavon was on a voyage from Lisbon, Portugal to Glasgow, Renfrewshire.
Mimi P.	Austria-Hungary	The barque was wrecked near Alcúdia, Mallorca, Spain with some loss of life. She was on a voyage from Marseille, Bouches-du-Rhône, France to Montevideo, Uruguay.
Telegraf	Norway	The brig was abandoned in the North Sea 16 nautical miles (30 km) north of Texel, North Holland, Netherlands. Her eight crew were rescued by the smack Laurel (United Kingdom). Telegraf was on a voyage from Kragerø to London, United Kingdom. The derelict was towed into the Nieuwe Diep in a waterlogged condition on 22 November.

== 21 November ==
List of shipwrecks: 21 November 1883
Ship	State	Description
Catherina Hillechina	Germany	The ship departed from the River Tyne for Rendsburg. No further trace, reported overdue.
Erie Belle	United States	The tug was wrecked by a boiler explosion whilst attempting to refloat the schooner J. N. Carter Canada 2 nautical miles (3.7 km) south of Kincardine, Ontario, Canada. Four of her twelve crew were killed.
Fulmar	United Kingdom	The steamship was driven ashore at Boulogne, Pas-de-Calais, France. Her crew were rescued by the Boulogne Lifeboat Louis Fontaine (France). Fulmar was on a voyage from Middlesbrough, Yorkshire to Boulogne. She was refloated in early December and taken in o Boulogne.

== 22 November ==
List of shipwrecks: 22 November 1883
Ship	State	Description
Espadarto	Portugal	The ship departed from Bridgewater, Nova Scotia, Canada for Madeira. No further trace, reported overdue.
New Brunswick	Norway	The barque was driven ashore and wrecked at Newhaven, Sussex, United Kingdom. Her eleven crew were rescued by the Newhaven Lifeboat.
Nisero	United Kingdom	The steamship was driven ashore and wrecked at Acheen, Kingdom of Aceh Darussalam. Her crew survived, but were taken prisoner by the Sultan. She was on a voyagte from Surabaya, Netherlands East Indies to a European port. The wreck was plundered by the local inhabitants.

== 23 November ==
List of shipwrecks: 23 November 1883
Ship	State	Description
Rhône	Switzerland	The steamship was run into by the steamboat Cygne (Switzerland) and sank in Lake Geneva with the loss of 11 lives (initial reports said 20).

== 24 November ==
List of shipwrecks: 24 November 1883
Ship	State	Description
Unnamed	Italy	The barque was driven ashore and wrecked at Natal, Brazil. Her crew were rescued.

== 25 November ==
List of shipwrecks: 25 November 1883
Ship	State	Description
New Brunswick	Norway	The barque was wrecked at Birling Gap, Sussex, United Kingdom. Her eleven crew were rescued by the Eastbourne Lifeboat The William and Mary ( Royal National Lifeboat Institution).

== 26 November ==
List of shipwrecks: 26 November 1883
Ship	State	Description
Marigo	Greece	The ship sank at Cette, Hérault, France. Her crew were rescued. She was on a voyage from Thessaloniki to Cette.

== 27 November ==
List of shipwrecks: 27 November 1883
Ship	State	Description
Judit	Netherlands	The ship was lost near Mandal, Norway, with the loss of fourteen of her fifteen crew. Her captain was rescued. She was on a voyage from Loviisa, Sweden to Purmerend, North Holland.

== 29 November ==
List of shipwrecks: 29 November 1883
Ship	State	Description
Boy Jack	United Kingdom	The fishing lugger collided with the steamship J. M. Strachan (United Kingdom) and sank off Great Yarmouth, Norfolk with the loss of a crew member. Survivors were rescued by J. M. Strachan.
Elemore	United Kingdom	The steamship collided with another vessel and sank in the River Thames near Gravesend, Kent with the loss of two of her crew.
Triumph	United States	The barque was wrecked on Tiritiri Island, in the Hauraki Gulf. Salvaged, repaired and put in New Zealand service.
Triumph	United Kingdom	The ship departed from Gioia Tauro, Italy for the Clyde. No further trace, reported missing.

== 30 November ==
List of shipwrecks: 30 November 1883
Ship	State	Description
Druid	United Kingdom	The steamship ran aground at Port Talbot, Glamorgan. She was refloated the next day and resumed her voyage.
Hope	(United Kingdom of Great Britain and Ireland) Guernsey	The ketch struck the Rundlestone, Cornwall and sank. Her crew were rescued. She was on a voyage from Swansea, Glamorgan to Guernsey.
Lord Marmion	United Kingdom	The ship collided with the steamship Jane Bacon (United Kingdom) and sank off Swansea, Glamorgan with the loss of five of her crew.
Mary Wiggins	Canada	The barque was driven ashore at Cap La Heve. Seine-Inférieure, France with the loss of a crew member. She was on a voyage from New York, United States to Havre de Grâce, Seine-Inférieure. She subsequently broke up.
Ocean Bride	United Kingdom	The ship departed from London for Newcastle upon Tyne, Northumberland. No further trace,. reported missing.
Regina	Canada	The full-rigged ship was abandoned in the Atlantic Ocean with the loss of eleven of her seventeen crew. Survivors took to a raft; they were rescued on 5 December by the barque Helen Finlayson (United Kingdom). Regina was on a voyage from Philadelphia, Pennsylvania, United States to London.
Rocabey	France	The ship collided with Thomas Dana (United States) and sank in the Atlantic Ocean with the loss of 89 of the 110 people on board. Survivors were rescued by Thomas Dana. Rocabey was on a voyage from Saint-Pierre, Saint Pierre and Miquelon to a port in Brittany.
Sutlej	United Kingdom	The steamship ran aground at Faro Point, Sicily, Italy. She was refloated and resumed her voyage.
Ville de Havre	France	The steamship ran aground at Leixões, Portugal. She was on a voyage from Havre de Grâce to Lisbon, Portugal. She was refloated and taken into Porto, where she was beached.
Wonderful	United Kingdom	The ship was driven ashore and wrecked at Sutton. All seven people on board were rescued. She was on a voyage from London to Leeds, Yorkshire.

== Unknown date ==
List of shipwrecks: Unknown date in November 1883
Ship	State	Description
Albert	Germany	The brig collided with the steamship and sank in the Stettin Lagoon. She was on a voyage from Hull, Yorkshire, United Kingdom to Stettin.
Anna Maria	Italy	The ship was driven ashore at Charlestown, South Carolina, United States. She was refloated on 6 November with the assistance of a tug.
Antagonist	(United Kingdom of Great Britain and Ireland) Guernsey	The ship was wrecked on Klein Curaçao, Curaçao and Dependencies. She was on a voyage from Curaçao to a British port.
Bethlehem	Germany	The schooner was abandoned in the Baltic Sea. She was towed into Bolderāja, Russia.
Carine	Norway	The fishing vessel was wrecked on the coast of Iceland. Her crew survived.
Conestoga	United States	The steamship foundered in Lake Michigan with the loss of seventeen lived.
Eclipse	United Kingdom	The steamship foundered in Lake Huron with the loss of all seven crew before 27 November. She was on a voyage from Algoma, United States to Port Sarnia, Ontario, Canada. Three bodies washed up near Wiarton, Ontario.
Eleonora Madre	Italy	The barque was wrecked on the coast of the Natal Colony.
Empress	United Kingdom	The steamship was driven ashore on the Dutch coast. She was on a voyage from Galveston, Texas, United States to Bremen, Germany. She was refloated and taken into the Nieuwe Dieo.
Familia Causi	Italy	The barque foundered off the African coast. Her crew were rescued by the barque J. H. Love (Denmark). Familia Causi was on a voyage from Cardiff, Glamorgan, United Kingdom to the Bacan Islands.
Francis Smith	Canada	The steamship was reported missing whilst on a voyage from Collingwood to Port Arthur, Ontario. She had 100 passengers aboard.
Garson	United Kingdom	The sailing barge ran aground on the Cross Sands, in the North Sea off the coast of Norfolk. She was on a voyage from London to Hull. She was refloated and taken into Great Yarmouth, Norfolk in a derelict condition.
George H. Pierson	United States	The fishing schooner sailed from Gloucester, Massachusetts for the Georges Bank on 8 November and probably sank in the gales on 12, 13, and 14 November. Lost with all twelve crew.
Glenrosa	United Kingdom	The barque was abandoned in the Atlantic Ocean. Her crew were rescued by the barque Maria Falanga (Italy). Glenrosa was on a voyage from Cardiff to Buenos Aires, Argentina.
Gorsente	Germany	The ship was driven ashore on Terschelling, Friesland, Netherlands.
Gustave	France	The fishing boat was wrecked off Cherbourg, Manche. Her crew were rescued by the smack Martha (United Kingdom).
Helen M. Dennis	United States	The fishing schooner sailed from Gloucester, Massachusetts for the Georges Bank on 1 November and probably sank in the gales on 12, 13, and 14 November. Lost with all twelve crew.
Helios	Germany	The barque was driven ashore in the Bay of St. George. She was on a voyage from Caraquet, New Brunswick, Canada to Glasgow, Renfrewshire, United Kingdom.
Hittero	Norway	The barque foundered off the coast of New Brunswick with the loss of all hands.
India	New Zealand	The barque was wrecked at Ho Rianga before 24 November.
James Wade	United States	The schooner foundered in Lake Erie with the loss of seven lives.
Java	France	The ship was wrecked in the Bahamas. She was on a voyage from Haiti to France.
John McDonough	United States	The fishing schooner sailed from Providence, Rhode Island for the Georges Bank and would have reached it before the gales, and probably sank in the gales on 12, 13, and 14 November. Lost with all sixteen crew.
Lotus	United Kingdom	The ship was abandoned at sea. She was on a voyage from Runcorn, Cheshire to Saint John's, Newfoundland Colony.
Margarita	Flag unknown	The ship caught fire at New York, United States.
Mario	Italy	The barque foundered at sea. Her crew were rescued by a German barque.
Mattie B. Rulon	United States	The ship was abandoned in the Atlantic Ocean before 22 November.
Plovmander	Norway	The barque was wrecked on Cape Breton Island, Nova Scotia, Canada with the loss of eleven of her thirteen crew.
Prosper Corne	Flag unknown	The ship ran aground at Bordeaux, Gironde, France. She was on a voyage from Saint John's to Bordeaux.
Queen	Flag unknown	The steamship was driven ashore on Naissaar, Russia. She was on a voyage from Charleston, South Carolina, United States to Reval, Russia.
Rob Roy	United Kingdom	The steamship was driven ashore on the Carr Rock and sank with the loss of a crew member.
Royal Star	United Kingdom	The schooner was lost in Placentia Bay with the loss of all six crew.
Ruth Groves	United States	The schooner vanished after leaving Provincetown, Massachusetts on 21 October. Believed to have sunk in a gale that occurred on 12 November on the Georges Bank. Lost with all twelve hands.
Senegal	France	The steamship was driven ashore at Corcubión, Spain. Her crew were rescued. She was on a voyage from Smyrna, Ottoman Empire to Havre de Grâce, Seine-Inférieure.
Signal	United Kingdom	The brigantine ran aground near Martinique and was severely damaged.
Thor	Sweden	The steamship collided with the steamship Kiew (Denmark) and sank near Swinemünde, Germany with the loss of a crew member. Thor was on a voyage from Bergen to Stettin, Germany.
Tjorkenning	Norway	The fishing vessel was wrecked on the coast of Iceland. Her crew survived.
Twee Gezusters	Netherlands	The galiot was driven ashore at Rye, Sussex, United Kingdom. She was on a voyage from Hamburg to Littlehampton, Sussex.
Valdivia	United Kingdom	The ship departed from Old Calaba, Africa for Falmouth, Cornwall. No further trace, reported ovedue.
Unnamed	Flag unknown	The barge was wrecked in Lake Ontario with the loss of all five people on board.
