= Alberte =

- Gender: Feminine (Danish, French); masculine (Galician)
- Language: Danish, French, Galician

Origin
- Language: Germanic
- Meaning: Noble and bright

Other names
- Related names: Albert, Alberta, Albertina, Albertine, Albertyna

Alberte is a given name of Germanic origin, derived from the elements adal ("noble") and beraht ("bright"). It is a feminine form of Albert in Danish and French, and a masculine form in Galician.

== Notable people ==
- Alberte Aveline (1939–2018), French actress
- Alberte Brun (1918–1991), French pianist
- Alberte de Campou (1935–2022), French sprinter
- Alberte Ebler (born 2003), Danish handball player
- Alberte Kielstrup Madsen (born 2000), Danish handball player
- Alberte Pagán (born 1965), Galician filmmaker and writer
- Alberte Kjær Pedersen (born 1998), Danish runner and triathlete
- Alberte Pullman (1920–2011), French chemist
- Alberte Vingum (born 2004), Danish footballer
- Alberte Winding (born 1963), Danish singer and actress
