= Albertines =

Albertines may refer to:

- Albertine Wettins, a branch of the German noble House of Wettin
- Albertine Brothers, a Catholic congregation of religious brothers

== See also ==
- Albertine (disambiguation)
