= Albertine (given name) =

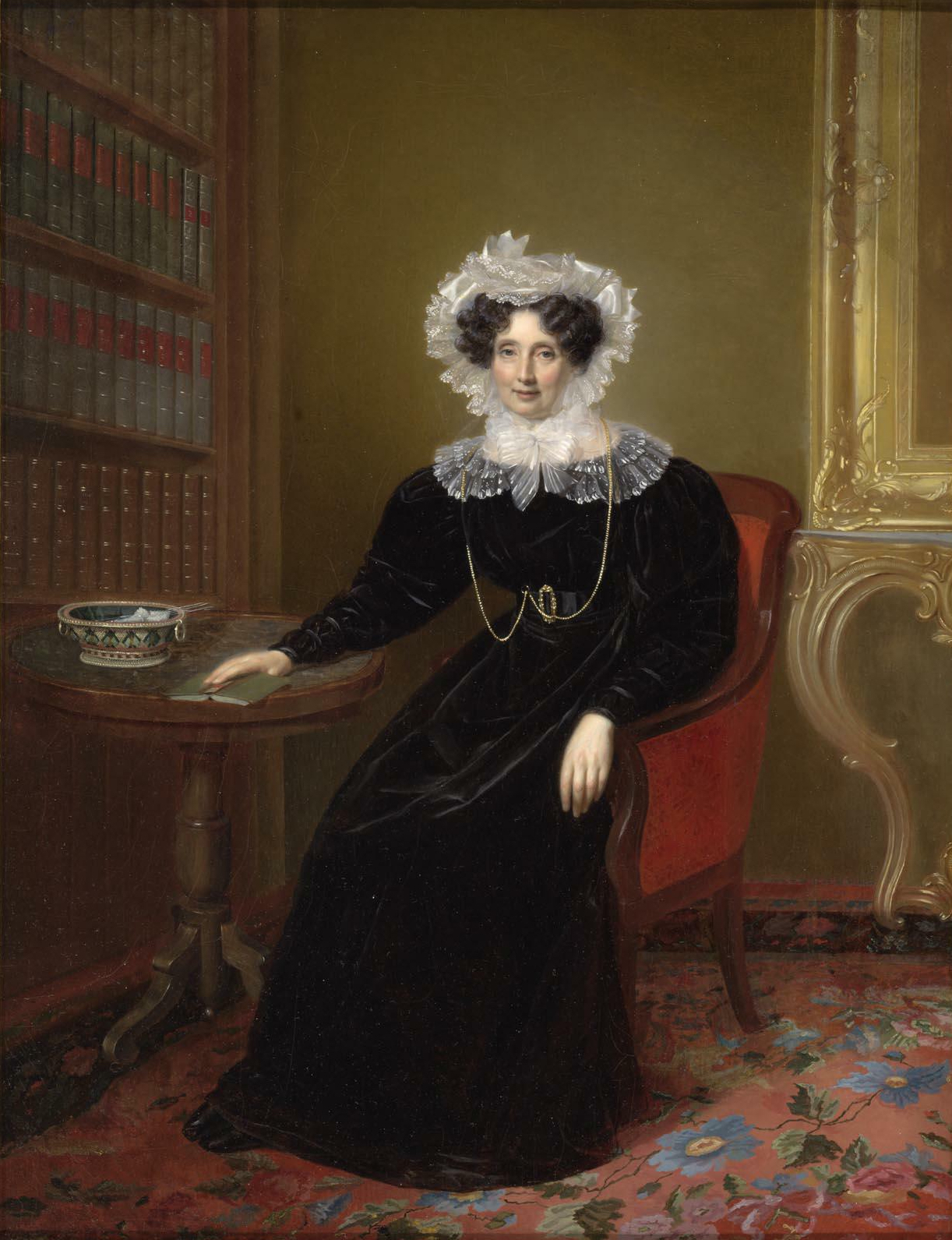
- Albertine Necker de Saussure (1766–1841), Swiss writer and educator
- Gender: Feminine
- Languages: French, German

Other gender
- Masculine: Albert

Origin
- Language: Germanic
- Meaning: Noble and bright

Other names
- Related names: Alberta, Alberte, Albertina

Albertine is a feminine given name used in French and German, derived from the masculine name Albert. It originates from the Germanic elements adal ("noble") and beraht ("bright").

The name ranked among the 100 most popular names for girls in France from 1900 to 1926 and again in 1928, remaining among the top 500 until 1957. In the United States, it appeared intermittently among the top 1,000 names for girls between 1880 and 1925.

== Notable people ==
- Albertine of Brandenburg-Schwedt (1712–1750), German princess
- Albertine, Baroness Staël von Holstein (1797–1838)
- Albertine Agnes of Nassau (1634–1696), regent of Friesland, Groningen and Drenthe
- Princess Elisabeth Albertine of Saxe-Hildburghausen (1713–1761), Duchess of Mecklenburg-Strelitz
- Ernestine Albertine of Saxe-Weimar (1722–1769), Countess of Lippe-Alverdissen
- Louise Albertine of Schleswig-Holstein-Sonderburg-Plön (1748–1769), Danish princess
- Countess Sophia Albertine of Erbach-Erbach (1683–1742), German noblewoman and regent of Saxe-Hildburghausen
- Albertine Baclet (born 1922), French politician from Guadeloupe
- Albertine Badenberg (1865–1958), German teacher and women's rights activist
- Albertine Gnanazan Hépié, Ivorian politician
- Albertine Lapensée (1898-?), Canadian ice hockey player
- Albertine Morin-Labrecque (1886–1957), Canadian pianist, soprano, composer and music educator
- Albertine Necker de Saussure (1766–1841), Swiss writer and educator
- Albertine N'Guessan (died 2016), Ivorian actress
- Hinikissia Albertine Ndikert (born 1992), Chadian sprinter
- Albertine Rahéliarisoa (born 1961), Malagasy middle-distance runner
- Albertine Randall (1863–1954), American illustrator, cartoonist and costume designer
- Therese Albertine Luise Robinson (1797–1870), German author, linguist and translator
- Albertine Sarrazin (1937–1967), French writer
- Albertine Thackwell (1863–1944), British archer
- Albertine Van Roy-Moens (1915–1987), Belgian gymnast
- Albertine Winner (1907–1988), British physician and medical administrator
- Albertine Zullo (born 1967), Swiss illustrator
