= Holwert =

- Village
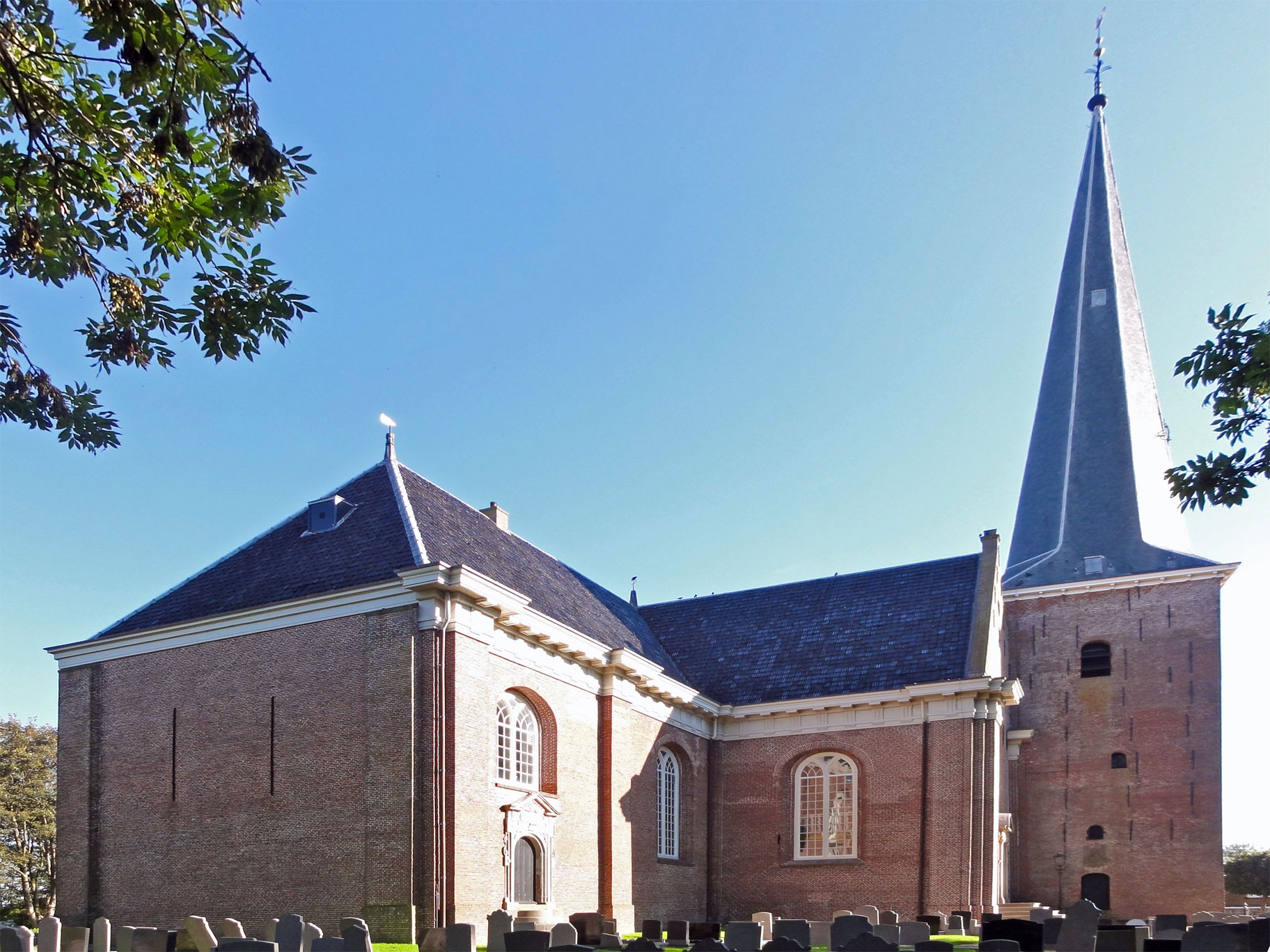
- St Willibrord church

- Flag Coat of arms

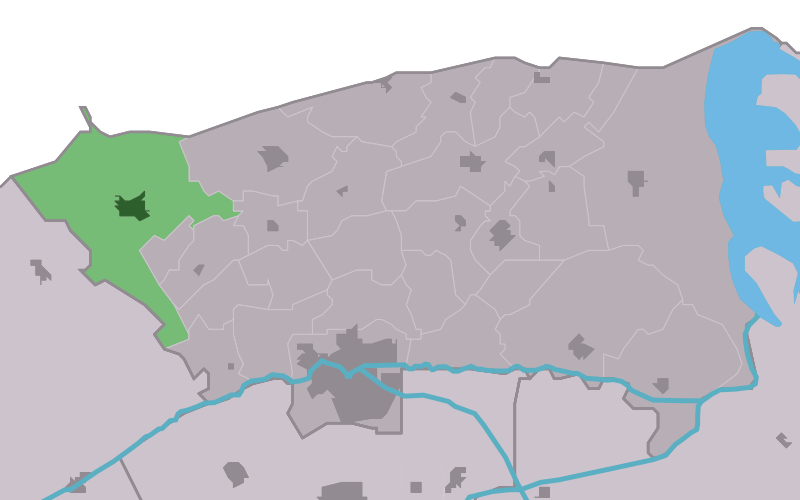
- Location in the former Dongeradeel municipality

- Location in the Netherlands Holwert (Netherlands)
- Country: Netherlands
- Province: Friesland
- Municipality: Noardeast-Fryslân

Area
  - Total: 18.42 km^{2} (7.11 sq mi)
- Elevation: 0.7 m (2.3 ft)

Population (2021)
  - Total: 1,595
  - Density: 86.59/km^{2} (224.3/sq mi)
- Time zone: UTC+1 (CET)
  - Summer (DST): UTC+2 (CEST)
- Postal code: 9151
- Dialing code: 0519

Holwert is a village in Noardeast-Fryslân municipality in the northern Netherlands, in the province of Friesland. It had a population of around 1,607 in January 2017. Before 2019, the village was part of the Dongeradeel municipality.

The ferry to the island of Ameland departs from Holwert. Wadloopcentrum Fryslân in Holwert is a centre for the training of wadlopen guides and the preservation of the sport. There are two windmills in Holwert, De Hoop and Miedenmolen.

== History ==
The village was first mentioned in early-11th century as Holeuurt, and means "hollow terp". Holwert developed as a terp (artificial living mound) village several centuries before Christ in a radial shape. The original terp was designated for the church, and in the 8th or 9th century, a long stretched out terp was created for trade and residential houses. In the 11th or 12th century, a dike was built along the Wadden Sea coast, however Holwert remained outside the dike until 1580.

The tower of the Dutch Reformed church dates from the 13th century. The spire has probably been added in 1661. In 1776, the old church was demolished, and an L-shaped church was built in its place. In 1840, Holwert was home to 1,741 people.

In 1872, a dam was privately constructed from Holwert to the island of Ameland across the Wadden Sea, and on 9 June, it was possible to walk to Ameland. The dam required a lot of maintenance. In October 1881, a storm created a hole in the dike, and two more holes were created in April 1882. In 1888, an investment of ƒ 1.2 million was needed to strengthen and repair the dam, and a loan was asked from the government, however the Dutch parliament voted against the proposal. A part of the dam still exists. The ferry to Ameland leaves on the end of the remaining dam.

Holwert is one of the starting points for wadlopen (mudflat hiking). At low tide, it is possible to walk to the island of Ameland. Mudflat hiking is potentially dangerous, and is only allowed under the supervision of a licensed guide.

The village's official name was changed from Holwerd to Holwert in 2023.

== Transportation ==
Holwert had a station on the North Friesland Railway, which opened in 1901 and closed to passengers in 1940. The ferry to Ameland departs from Holwert on the end of the dam.

== Notable people ==
- Hans Willem van Aylva (c. 1633–1691, admiral
- Theo Hiddema (born 1944), lawyer and politician
- Johannes Phocylides Holwarda (1618–1651), astronomer, physician, and philosopher
- Albertina Soepboer (born 1969), writer

== Gallery ==
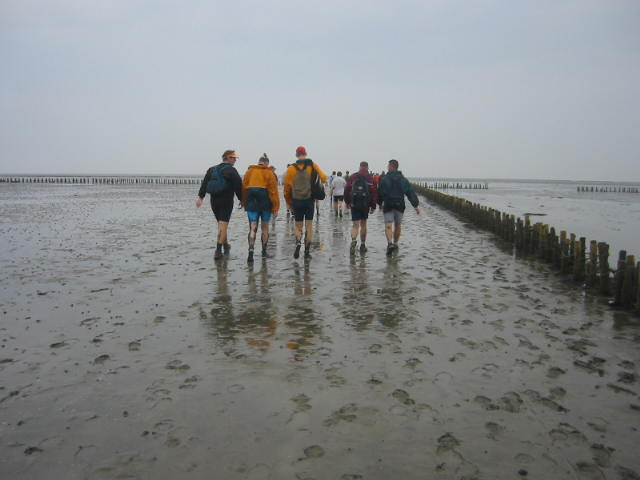
Wadlopen

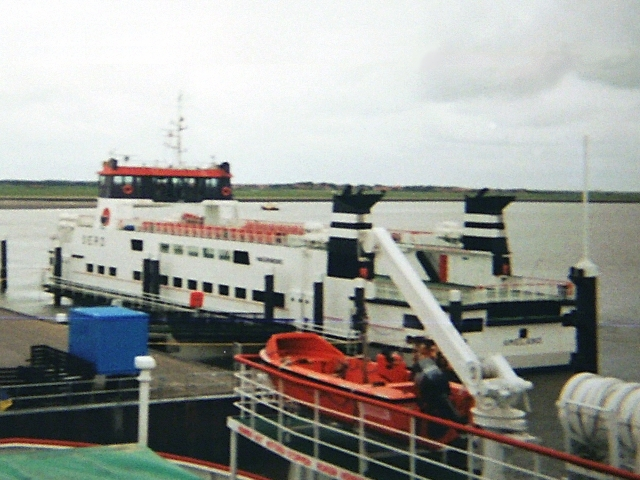
Ferry

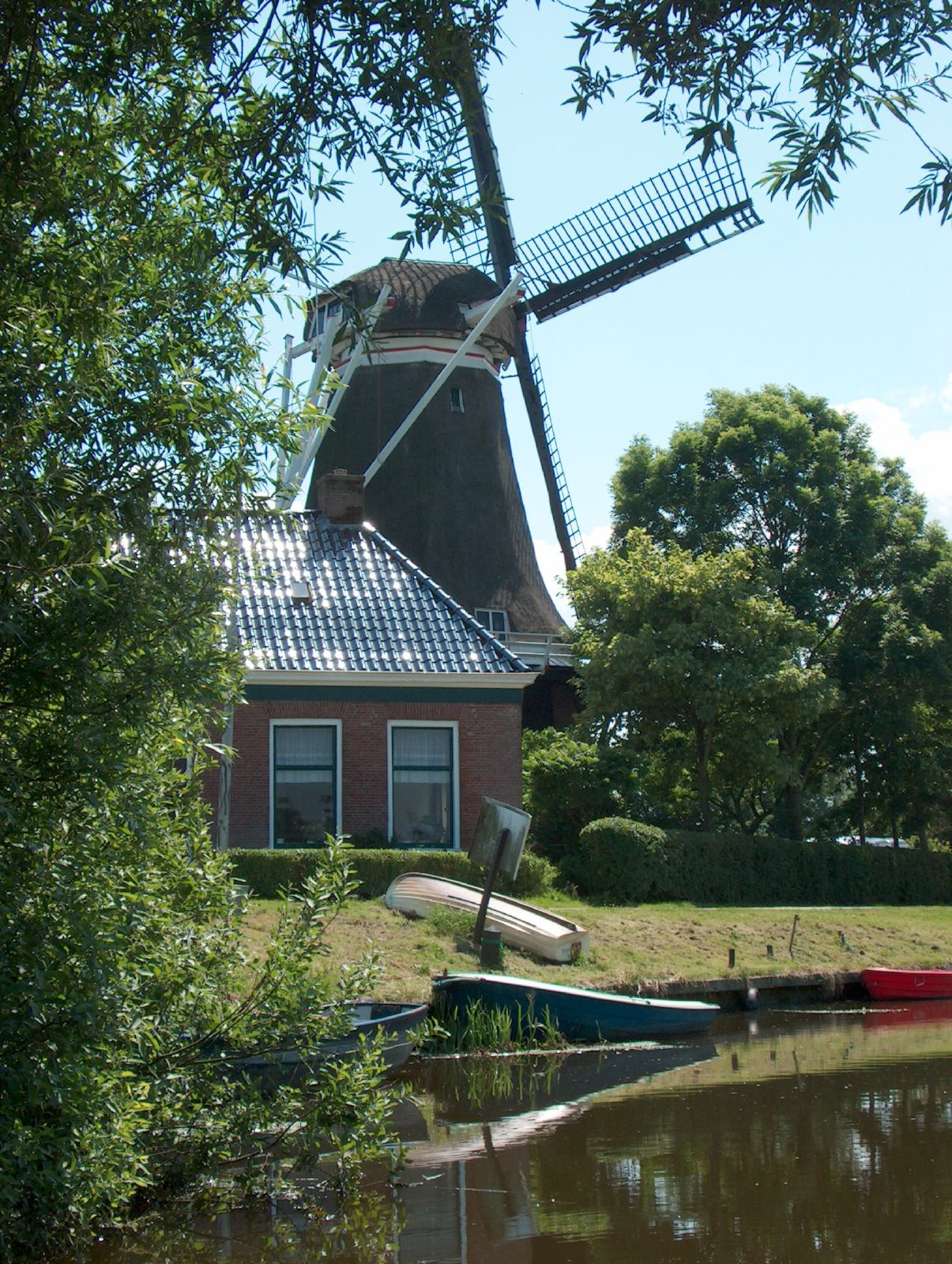
De Hoop

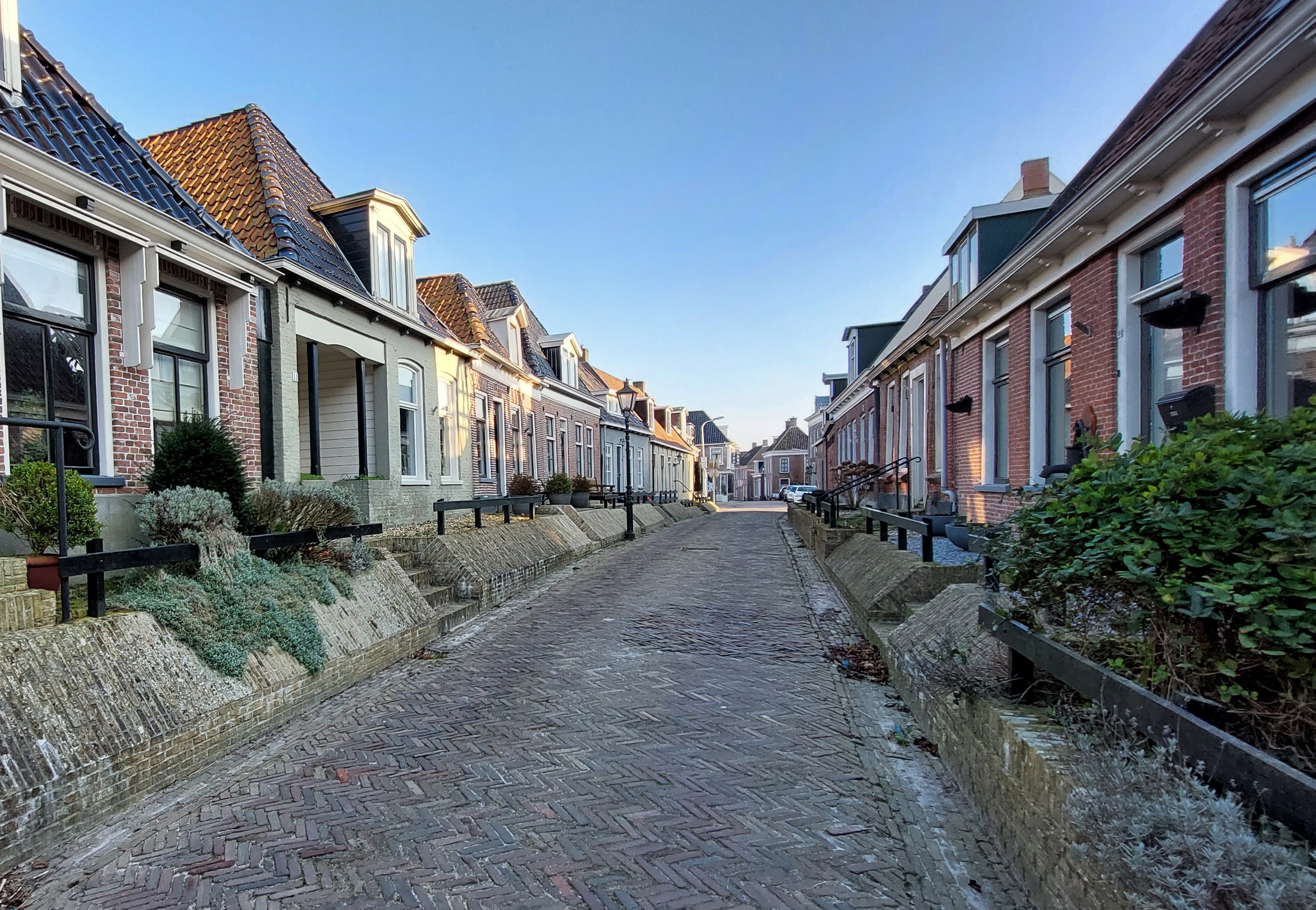
Street view

== See also ==
- Holwerda
