= Albertine Baclet =

French politician

Member of the French National Assembly
- In office 3 April 1967 – 30 May 1968
- Preceded by: Gaston Feuillard
- Succeeded by: Gaston Feuillard

Personal details
- Born: 1 December 1922 (age 103) Grand-Bourg
- Party: Union of Democrats for the Republic

Albertine Baclet (born 1 December 1922) is a politician from Guadeloupe who served in the French National Assembly from 1967 to 1968. She turned 100 on 1 December 2022.

== Biography ==
Albertine Adige, later Baclet, was born into a modest family in Grand-Bourg, on the rural island of Marie-Galante. Drawn to teaching from an early age, she continued her studies in Guadeloupe and became a schoolteacher after completing her teacher training. She first taught at various schools in Marie-Galante before becoming a principal. Her commitment to education, discipline, and academic success earned her great respect in the local community.

She married Albert Baclet, mayor of the town of Saint-Louis de Marie-Galante, with whom she shares a deep commitment to community life and the transmission of knowledge.
