= Miedenmolen, Holwerd =

Smock mill in Holwerd, Friesland, Netherlands

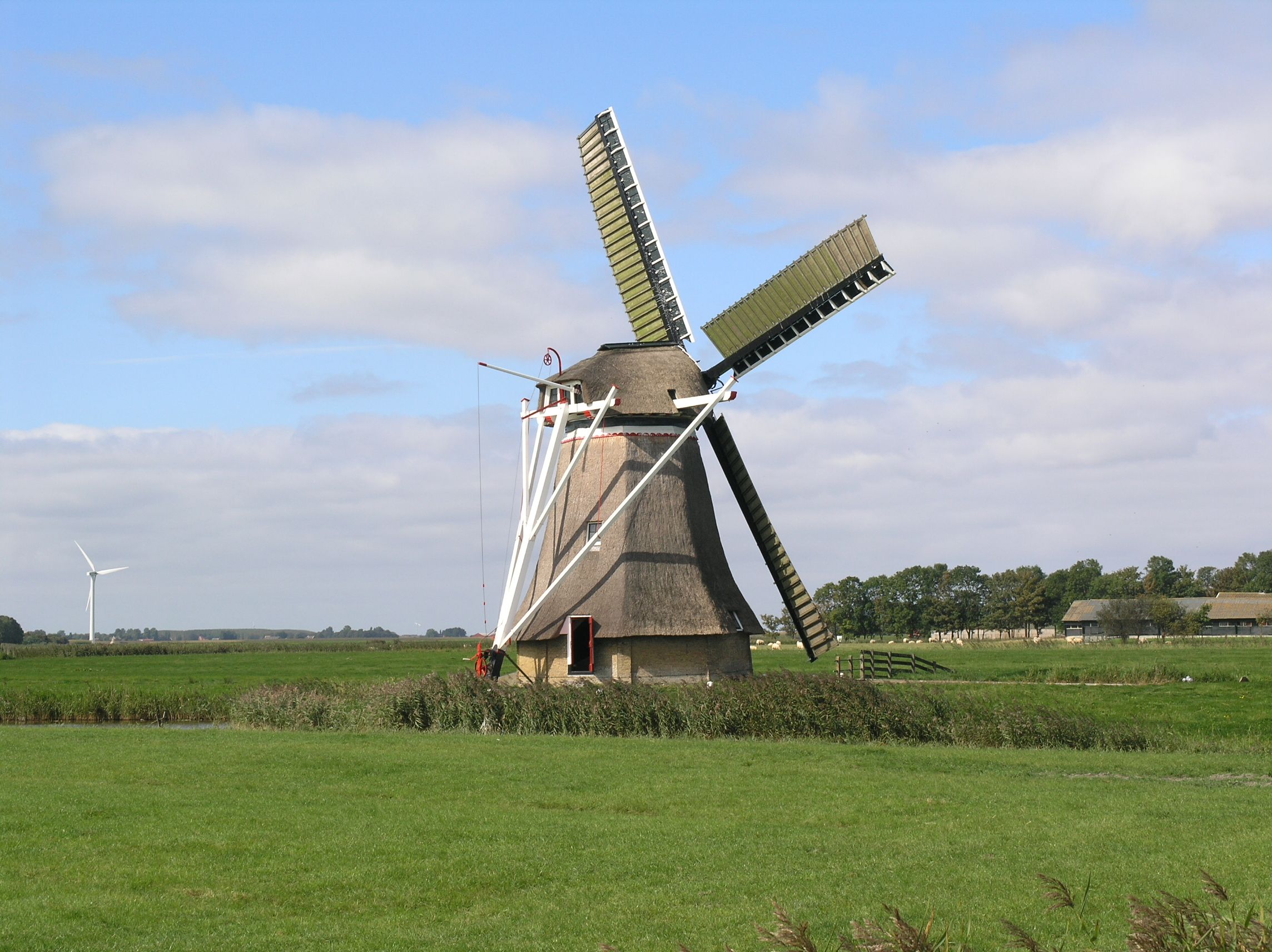
- Miedenmolen, September 2009

Origin
- Mill name: Miedenmolen
- Mill location: Miedweg 11, 9151 AH Holwerd
- Coordinates: 53°20′29″N 5°55′09″E
- Operator(s): Stichting De Fryske Mole
- Year built: 1855

Information
- Purpose: Drainage mill
- Type: Smock mill
- Storeys: Three-storey smock
- Base storeys: Single-storey base
- Smock sides: Eight sides
- No. of sails: Four sails
- Type of sails: Patent sails
- Windshaft: Cast iron
- Winding: Tailpole and winch
- Auxiliary power: Electric motor
- Type of pump: Archimedes' screw

Miedenmolen is a smock mill in Holwerd, Friesland, Netherlands which was built in 1855. The mill has been restored to working order. It is listed as a Rijksmonument, number 38696.

== History ==
Meidenmolen was built in 1855 to drain the Dwergsmear Polder. In 1953, the water board decided to fully mechanise the mill. Meetings held on 27 December 1961 and 13 March 1962 resulted in the mill being assisted by an electric motor, but full mechanisation was not carried out. The mill was restored in 1966. The mill was sold to Stichting De Fryske Mole (English: Frisian Mills Foundation) on 4 May 1976. Further restorations were carried out in 1978 and 1994, the latter was carried out by millwright Thijs Jellema of Birdaard. In 2004 a new steel Archimedes' screw was fitted. In 2006, the mill was officially listed as being held in reserve for use in an emergency.

== Description ==
Meidenmolen is what the Dutch describe as an grondzeiler. It is a three-storey smock mill on a single-storey base. There is no stage, the sails reaching almost to the ground. The mill is winded by tailpole and winch. The smock and cap are thatched. The sails are Patent sails. They have a span of 20.80 metres (68 ft 3 in). The sails are carried on a cast-iron windshaft, which was cast in 1904 by De Munck Kiezer, Martenshoek, Groningen. The windshaft also carries the brake wheel which has 57 cogs. This drives the wallower (29 cogs) at the top of the upright shaft. At the bottom of the upright shaft, the crown wheel, which has 44 cogs drives a gearwheel with 43 cogs on the axle of the Archimedes' screw. The axle of the Archimedes' screw is 620 millimetres (2 ft 0 in) diameter. The screw is 1.70 metres (5 ft 7 in) diameter and 5.82 metres (19 ft 1 in) long. It is inclined at 19.7°. Each revolution of the screw lifts 1,667 litres (367 imp gal) of water.

== Public access ==
Meidenmolen is open by appointment.
