= Holwerda =

Holwerda is a West Frisian and Dutch surname. It originally denoted someone from the village of Holwert. Notable people with the surname include:

- Benne Holwerda (1909–1952), Dutch theologian
- Gus Holwerda (born 1975), American film director
- Sina Wynne Holwerda (born 1997), an American rapper known monomymously as Wynne
