= Alberta (disambiguation) =

Alberta is a Canadian province.

Alberta may also refer to:

== Places ==
=== Australia ===
- Alberta, Queensland, a locality in the Central Highlands, Australia

=== Canada ===
- Alberta (Provisional District), a federal electoral district in the Northwest Territories from 1887 to 1908
- Alberta Plateau, a plateau in Alberta and British Columbia
- District of Alberta, a former district of the North West Territories, now the southern part of the province of Alberta
- Mount Alberta, Alberta

=== United States ===
- Alberta, Alabama, an unincorporated community
- Alberta, Louisiana, a former lumbering community just north of Roy, Louisiana
- Alberta, Michigan, an unincorporated community
- Alberta, Minnesota, a city
- Alberta, Virginia, a town
- Alberta City, Tuscaloosa, Alabama, a suburb of Tuscaloosa
- Alberta Township, Benton County, Minnesota

== People ==
- Alberta (given name)
- Alberta (singer), singer from Sierra Leone

== Music ==
- "Alberta" (blues), several blues songs
- "Alberta" (anthem), the official provincial song of Alberta
- T-Rex Alberta, a guitar effect pedal

== Other uses ==
- Alberta (plant), a genus in the family Rubiaceae
- 45562 Alberta, a British LMS Jubilee Class locomotive
- Project Alberta, part of the Manhattan Project
- University of Alberta, Edmonton, Alberta, Canada
- HMY Alberta, a yacht
- SS Alberta, several ships

== See also ==
- Albertan epoch, alternate name for the Middle Cambrian geological epoch
- Albertosaurus dinosaur
