= Birdie (given name) =

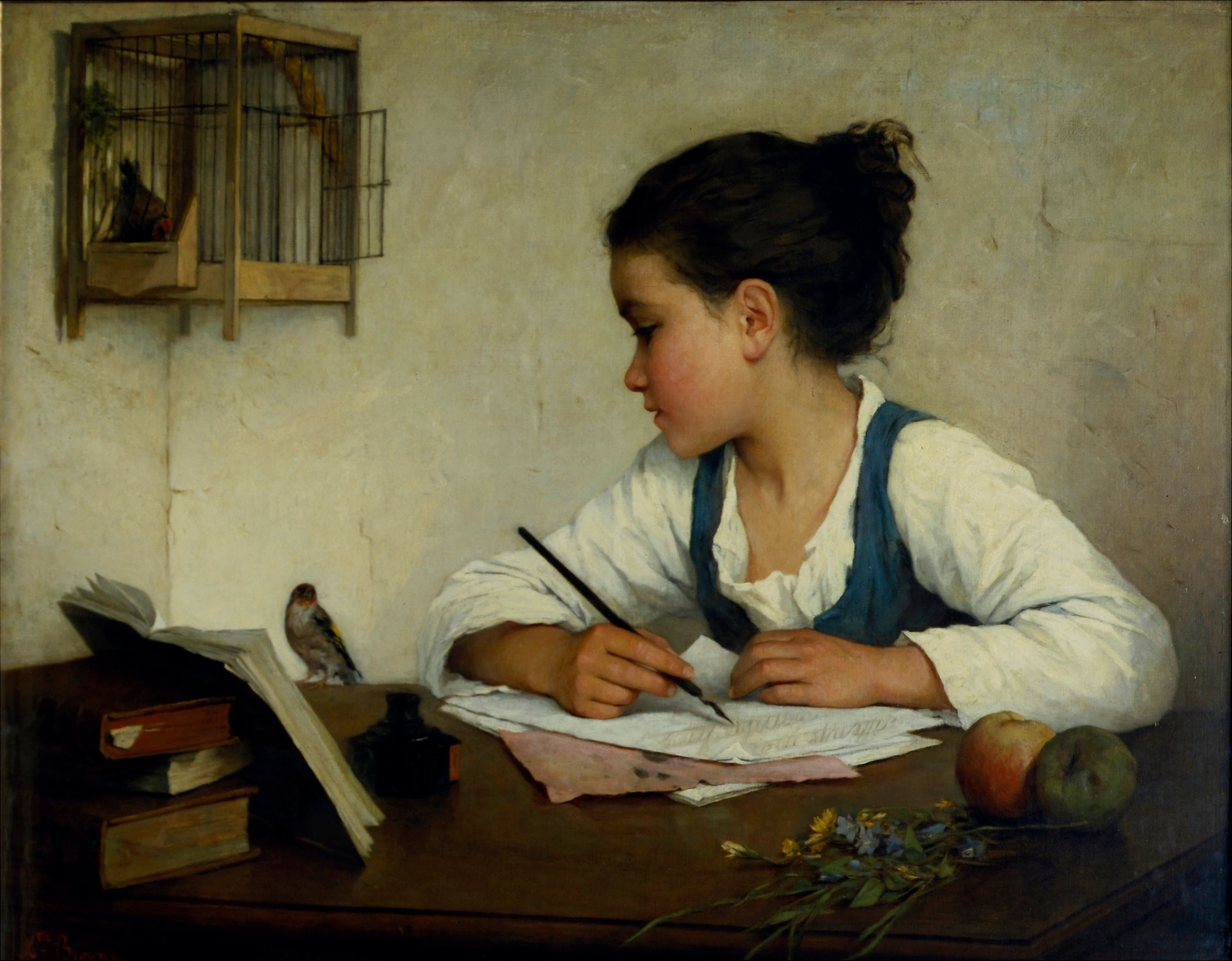
- A Girl Writing: The Pet Goldfinch by Henriette Browne, 1870.
- Gender: Primarily female
- Language: English

Origin
- Meaning: bird

Birdie is a given name used in reference to an informal English diminutive word for a bird. Spelling variants include Birdee, Birdy, and Byrdie.

It has been in use since at least the 1800s in the United States both as a nickname for various formal names such as Elizabeth and as a formal name. It was among the one thousand most popular names for American girls between 1880 and 1940. It then declined in popularity but has since increased in usage and has ranked among the one thousand most used names for newborn American girls since 2021. Some commentators note that the name has risen in use for girls along with other names of a similar style that all exude cuteness and promote enjoyment, perhaps in reaction to serious times.

== Notable people ==
- Birdie Alexander (1870–1960), American educator and music teacher
- Birdie Amsterdam (1901–1996), American attorney and judge
- Birdice “Birdie” Blye-Richardson (1871–1935), American pianist
- Birdie Draper (1916–2005), American parachutist and stunt performer
- Birdie Robertson Johnson (1868–1926), American political activist and clubwoman
- Birdie Reeve Kay (1907–1996), American champion typist and vaudeville performer
- Ju-Yun “Birdie” Kim, born 1981, South Korean professional golfer
- Bertha “Birdie” Parker Pollan (1907–1978), American archaeologist
- George Robert “Birdie” Tebbetts (1912–1999), American professional baseball player, manager, scout and front office executive.
- Virginia “Birdie” Fair Vanderbilt (1875–1935), an American socialite, hotel builder/owner, philanthropist, owner of Fair Stable, a Thoroughbred racehorse operation, and a member of the prominent Vanderbilt family by marriage.
- Edmund “Birdy” Sweeney (1931–1999), Irish actor and comedian
- Jasmine “Birdy” van den Bogaerde, born 1996, British singer, songwriter and musician
- Evelyn Byrd “Byrdie” Bell, born 1985, American actress
- Byrdie Green (1936–2008), American jazz and R&B singer
