= Albertine Badenberg =

German teacher and a feminist activist (1865–1958)

- Born: 29 December 1865; Steele, Rhine Province, Prussia, German confederation
- Died: 20 April 1958 (aged 92); Essen, North Rhine-Westphalia, West Germany
- Occupations: teacher politician feminist activist
- Political party: Centre Party
- Parent(s): Albert Badenberg (1831-1888); Auguste (1838-1922)

Albertine Badenberg (29 December 1865 – 20 April 1958) was a teacher and a feminist activist. She later became involved with mainstream politics (Centre Party), sitting as a member of the Prussian parliament ("Landtag") between 1924 and its abolition in 1933.

== Life ==
=== Provenance and early years ===
Albertine Badenberg was born in Steele, at that time a manufacturing town outside Essen (into which it has subsequently been subsumed), at the heart of the rapidly industrialising Ruhr region. Albert Badenberg (1831–1888), her father, was an architect and land surveyor. Her mother, Auguste (1838–1922), came from a family of Viennese minor aristocrats. Albertine left her girls' school when she was fifteen and spent the next two years in Belgium and England in order to learn French and English. She then attended a (single sex) teacher training college in Koblenz, passing her final exams in 1885, which qualified her to teach at middle and senior schools (for girls). In 1886 she accepted a teaching position locally in Steele and in 1887 she accepted the headship of the German School in Genoa. The sudden death of her father in March 1888 put an end to her career and travel plans, however, and she returned to Germany, finding herself at the age of 22 responsible not just for supporting herself, but also for her widowed (and thereby impoverished) mother and six younger siblings.

=== Feminism in a Catholic context ===
Badenberg had already joined the recently formed Association of Catholic Women Teachers ("Verein katholischer deutscher Lehrerinnen" / VkdL), and on returning from Italy she engaged actively with it. In 1894 she set up a job placement service and in 1896 a legal advice service for members. She campaigned for legal and financial equality with male teachers. She joined the VkdL executive committee in 1898. Her proposal as to how the association could acquire a more prominent public profile resulted in the launch in 1900 of "Christliche Frau" ("Christian Woman"), a news-magazine and a mouth-piece of the Catholic women's movement.

In the teeth of opposition from other parts of the catholic mainstream, in 1906 Badenberg played an important part in the founding of the German Catholic Women's Association. She became a member of its national executive and in 1909 founded a branch association in her home town, Steele. In 1910 she took over national responsibility for the KDFB's treasury function. In 1917 she absented herself from her teaching work in order to work full time for the KDFB as its General Secretary till 1921. That year she returned to teaching, becoming a deputy school head in 1922.

=== After the war ===
Naturally as a leading figure within the KDFB, Albertine Badenberg backed votes for women, but during the war years the topic was off the political agenda. Another organisation with close connections to the Catholic Church in Germany was the Centre Party, within which there were strong opinions on both side of the enfranchisement argument: formally the party tended to remain silent on the topic. However, in the aftermath of national military defeat and the emperor's abdication new constitutional arrangements became unavoidable in 1918, and the provisional government published a declaration that all future elections to public bodies would take place using a system of secret ballots and proportional representation, open to all persons aged at least 20, whether male or female. The "votes for women" debate thereby ended suddenly, and before there had been time for it to resurface. The Centre Party immediately approached the KDFB, calling for co-operation. One upshot was that the KDFB took on responsibility for the "political education of women" on behalf of the party. More generally, in the feverish political year that followed, the two were closely co-ordinated in their campaigning.

=== Prussian politics ===
At some stage Albertine Badenberg joined the Centre Party, becoming a member of the regional party executive, the district party executive and the local party executive. In December 1924 she was elected a member of the Prussian parliament ("Landtag"), representing the Düsseldorf-East electoral district, and taking a special interest in wages issues. The Landtag had been dissolved, along with other democratic institutions, by the time Albertine Badenberg celebrated her 68th birthday in December 1933.

=== Later years ===
There are suggestions that during the Hitler years Badenberg was in touch with opposition circles as the outreach of the Catholic associations became ever more constrained by the authorities. The Association of Catholic Women Teachers (VkdL) closed down in 1937 after the Gestapo confiscated its head office premises in Berlin-Steglitz. After 1945 she involved herself in helping to refound the VkdL, and remained engaged when in 1949 it was able to establish itself in a new head office in Essen. 1949 was also the year in which she undertook a pilgrimage to Assisi.

== Awards and honours ==
- 1955 Order of Merit of the Federal Republic of Germany on the occasion of her ninetieth birthday

A street in Essen has been named in her honour.
