= Albertina Soepboer =

Dutch writer (born 1969)

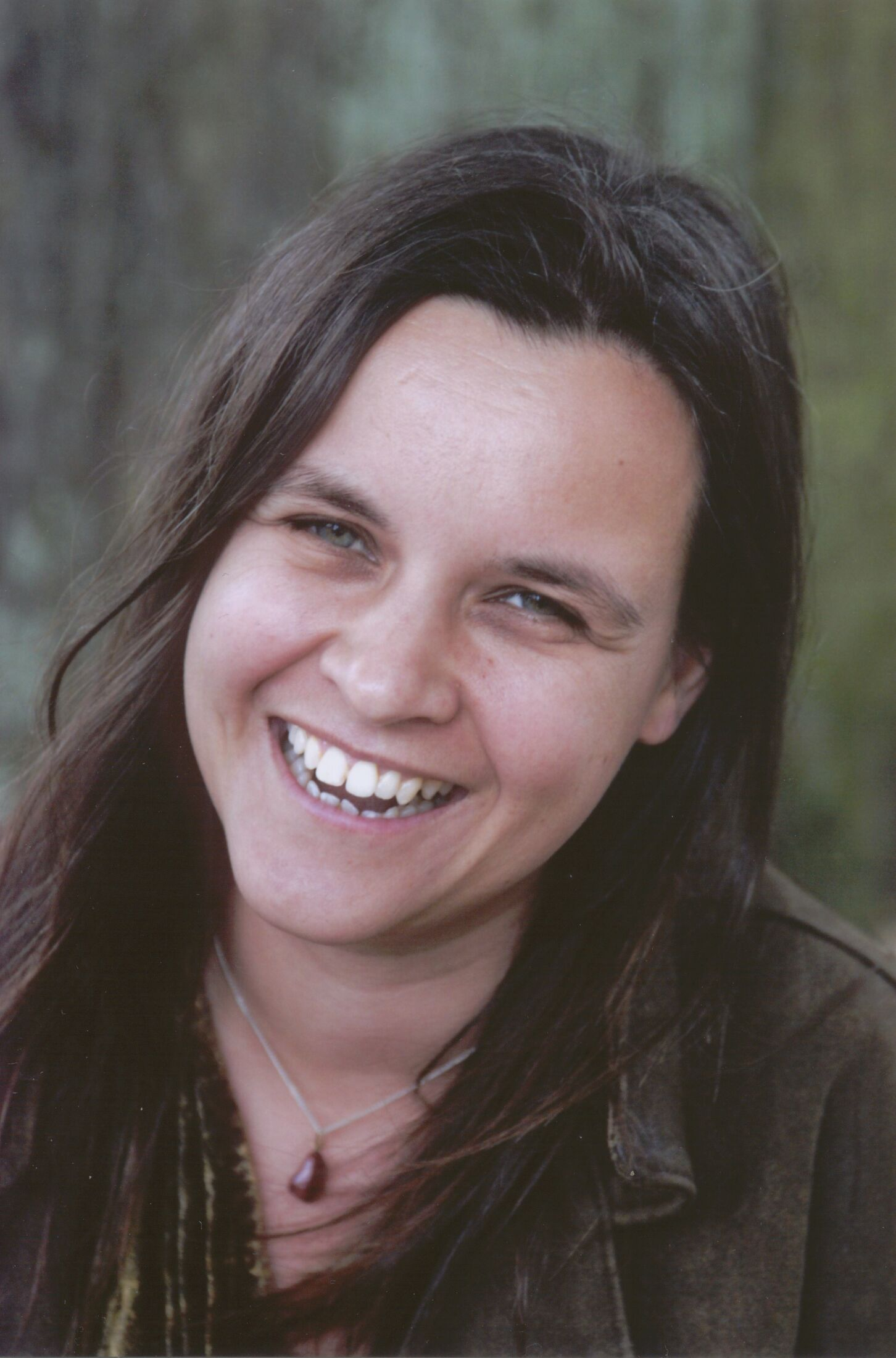
Albertina Soepboer (2004)

Albertina Soepboer (born December 3, 1969) is a Dutch writer writing in both Frisian and Dutch.

She was born in Holwerd and studied Romance languages and cultures and then Frisian literature in Groningen. Soepboer has written plays for the Theater De Citadel in Groningen.

Soepboer was a finalist for the Rely Jorritsma Prize in 1996, 1997 and 1998 for her poetry and received the prize in 2003 for the story Dy griene neisimmer.

== Selected works ==
- It nachtlân/Het nachtland (The Night Country), poetry in West Frisian (1998)
- De stobbewylch (The Pollard Willow), poetry in West Frisian (2000)
- De fjoerbidders (The Fire Worshippers), poetry (2003)
