= Albertina Almeida =

Indian lawyer and activist

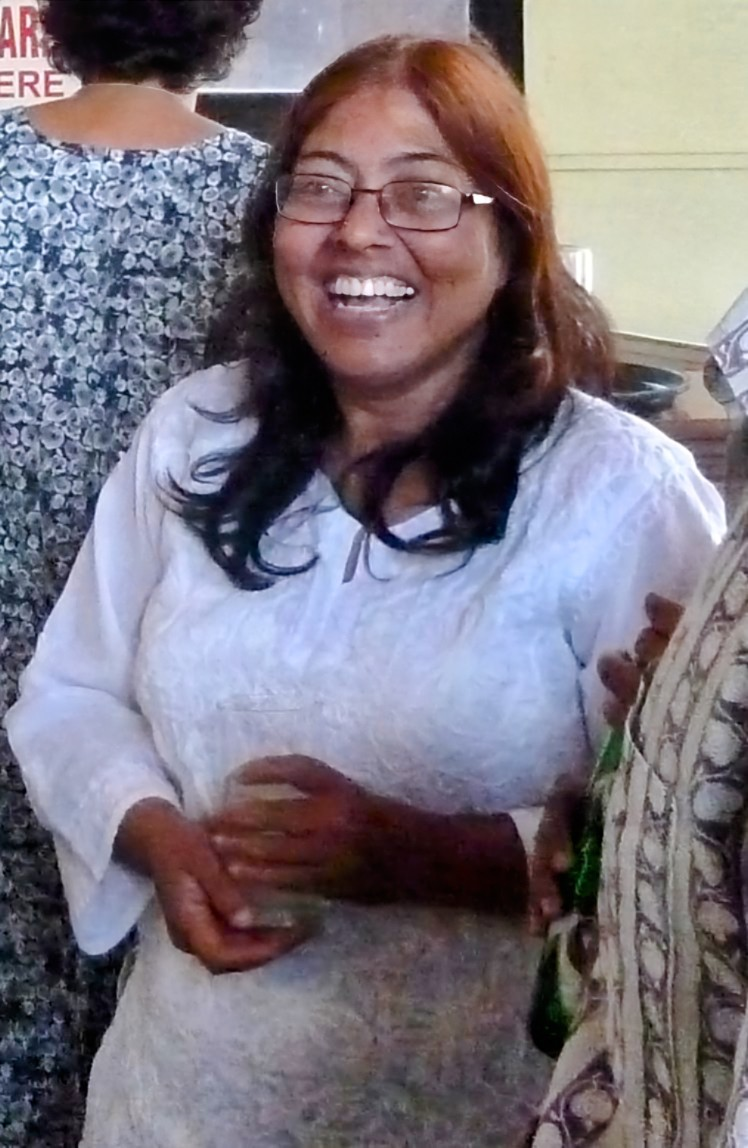
- Almeida in 2011
- Born: 1966 (age 59–60)
- Occupation: Lawyer

Albertina Almeida (born 1966) is a lawyer and human rights activist from Goa.

== Career ==
Almeida's parents both worked for the government. She holds a doctorate in Law and has authored a thesis on the matrimonial property rights of women. She co-founded Bailancho Saad (transl. Voice of Women), a women's collective organisation, and later Saad Aangan, a gender resource group. She has also co-initiated several other citizens' formations such as Citizens' Initiatives for Communal Harmony and SEZ Watch. She is also Visiting Senior Fellow at Impact and Policy Research Institute (IMPRI). She is a member of the Al-Zulaij Collective and of the Social Justice Action Committee-Goa. She has been a speaker at successive editions of the Goa Arts and Literature Festival. She was also part of a panel at Difficult Dialogues 2018, speaking on the topic Empowerment within the Family: Women and the Law. She was also a panelist at the 8th Policy Debate at Government Law College Mumbai's Debating and Literary Society on the potential of the Uniform Civil Code in India

She is a member of the Asia Pacific Forum on Women, Law and Development, which has a consultative status with UN ESCAP and is part of many networks including the Intercontinental Alliance for Women, Law and Development. She is the author of the book Tug and Tear: Dealing With Child Sexual Abuse.

She has taught as a part time lecturer at Salgaonkar College of Law, and as a visiting faculty at MA (Women's Studies) Goa University, National Academy of Legal Studies and Research, Hyderabad, apart from lecturing on the family laws of Goa at leading institutions such as the National Law School of India University, Bangalore, National Law University Delhi. She has been a member of the Board of Studies in Women's Studies at Goa University and at Shivaji University, Kolhapur, and has an office in Taleigao, Goa. She has written articles for Herald Goa, "Goa Today" The Wire and DNA News., Frontline and Indian Express, and poems for Muse India. She was part of the drafting Committee constituted by the Government of Goa to review and revise the Family Laws of Goa. She was also part of the panel for the program of Zero Discrimination Day, organised by Human Touch Foundation at Instituto Nossa Senhora de Piedade, Panjim.

=== Work with Bailancho Saad ===
Almeida co-founded Bailancho Saad in 1986. The organisation was responsible for putting gender on the agenda in Goa, and for getting the Dowry Prohibition Act extended to Goa and for unearthing a racket of selling abandoned infants in Goa.
