= Phyllonorycter albertinus =

Scientific classification
- Domain: Eukaryota
- Kingdom: Animalia
- Phylum: Arthropoda
- Class: Insecta
- Order: Lepidoptera
- Family: Gracillariidae
- Genus: Phyllonorycter
- Species: P. albertinus

Binomial name
- Phyllonorycter albertinus de Prins, 2012

Species of moth

Phyllonorycter albertinus is a moth of the family Gracillariidae. It is found in the Albertine Rift in Kenya in savannah areas with intermixed secondary vegetation.

The length of the forewings is 3.27–3.36 mm.
