= Albertine Gnanazan Hépié =

Ivorian politician

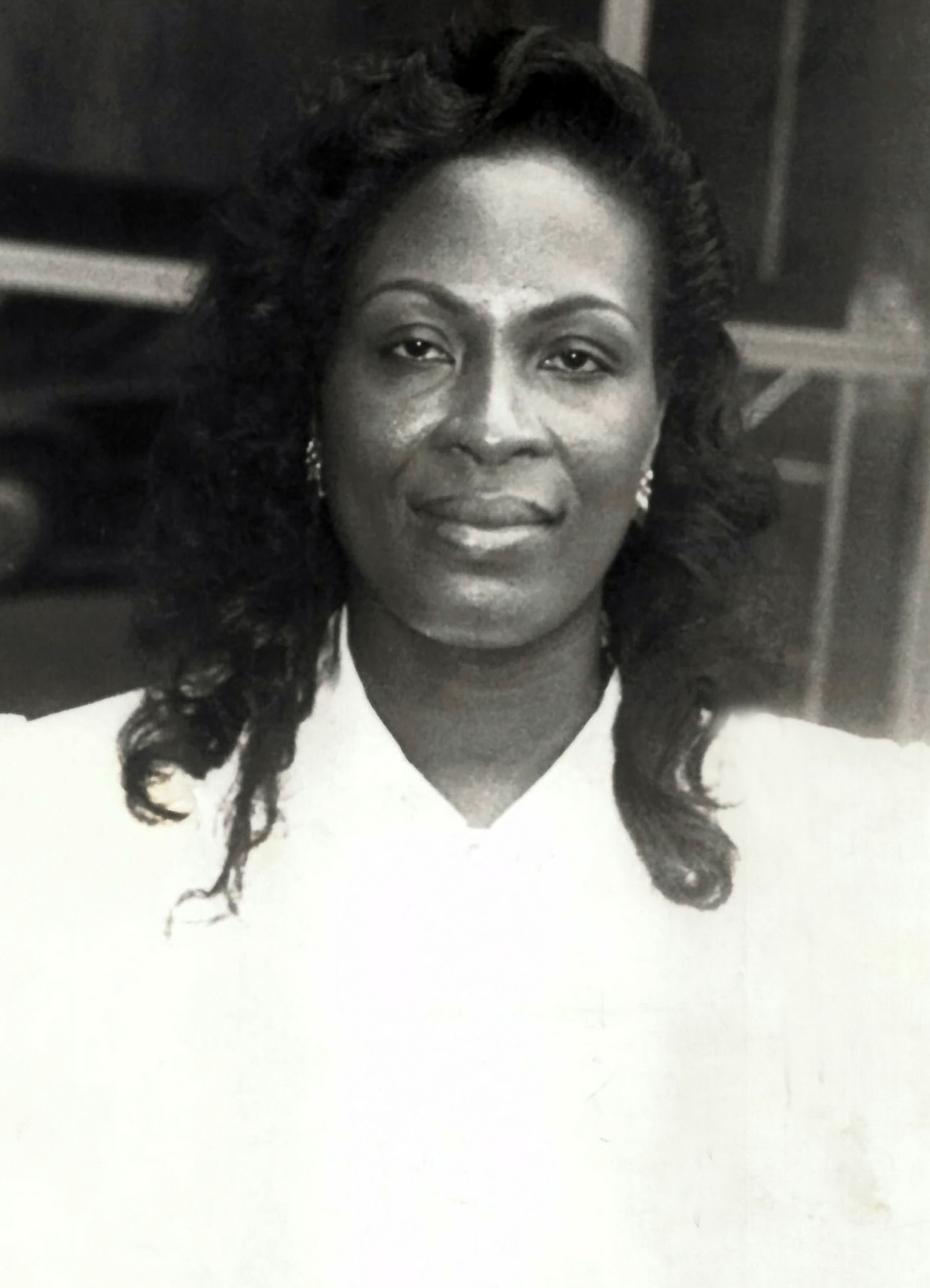
Albertine Gnanazan Hépié

Albertine Gnanazan Hépié is a politician from Ivory Coast. She served as Minister for the Family and the Promotion of Women from 1993 to 1998.
