= Albertina Ho =

Indonesian judge

- Born: 1 January 1960; Southeast Maluku, Indonesia
- Occupation: Judge

Albertina Ho SH, MH (born 1 January 1960) is a career woman judge at the General Court under the Supreme Court of Indonesia. Albertina became known publicly when she became chairwoman of the presiding judge bribery tax official Gayus Tambunan at the South Jakarta District Court. Because of persistence, rigor and seriousness as female judges, Albertina Ho earned the nickname "Srikandi Hukum" ("legal hero") by some.
