= Alberte Aveline =

French actress (1939–2018)

Alberte Aveline (September 1939 in Constantine, Algeria – 21 December 2018 in Paris) was a French stage actress. She was a sociétaire of the Comédie-Française from 1966 to 2003.

== Biography ==
She studied at the Conservatoire National Supérieur d'Art Dramatique in Paris, where she won first prize in modern drama and second prize in classical drama. She joined the Comédie-Française as a resident artist in 1966 and became its 480th member in 1989. She retired in 2003 and devoted herself to teaching.

She was married to actor René Arrieu from 1967 to 1978.
