= Albertine =

Albertine may refer to:

== Arts and entertainment ==
- Albertine (Krohg novel), an 1886 novel by Christian Krohg
  - Albertine i politilægens venteværelse (Albertine at the Police Doctor's Waiting Room), an 1887 painting by Krohg
- Albertine (Rose novel), a 2002 novel by Jacqueline Rose
- Albertine (album), a 2006 album by Brooke Fraser
  - "Albertine" (song), a song from the album
- Albertine Simonet, a character in Marcel Proust's novel In Search of Lost Time
- Albertine Prize, Francophone literary award to recognize French literature in translation, based in the United States

== People ==
- Albertine (given name)
- Albertin di Virga, 15th-century Venetian cartographer
- Albertine Necker de Saussure (1766–1841), Swiss writer and educationalist
- Albertine Sarrazin (1937–1967), French author
- Albertine Zullo (born 1967), professionally known simply as Albertine, Swiss illustrator
- Viv Albertine (born 1954), Australian-born British singer and songwriter
- Princess Elisabeth Albertine of Saxe-Hildburghausen (1713–1761)
- Albertine, Baroness Staël von Holstein (1797–1838)

== Other uses ==
- Albertine Rift, the western branch of the East African Rift
- Albertine Brothers, a Catholic congregation of religious brothers
- Albertine Wettins, junior branch of the House of Wettin family
- Albertine, a French nickname for the Royal Library of Belgium

== See also ==
- Albert (disambiguation)
- Albertina (disambiguation)
- Albertine Statute, the constitution that Charles Albert of Sardinia conceded to the Kingdom of Sardinia in Italy in 1848
