= Albertina Johannes =

Namibian sprinter

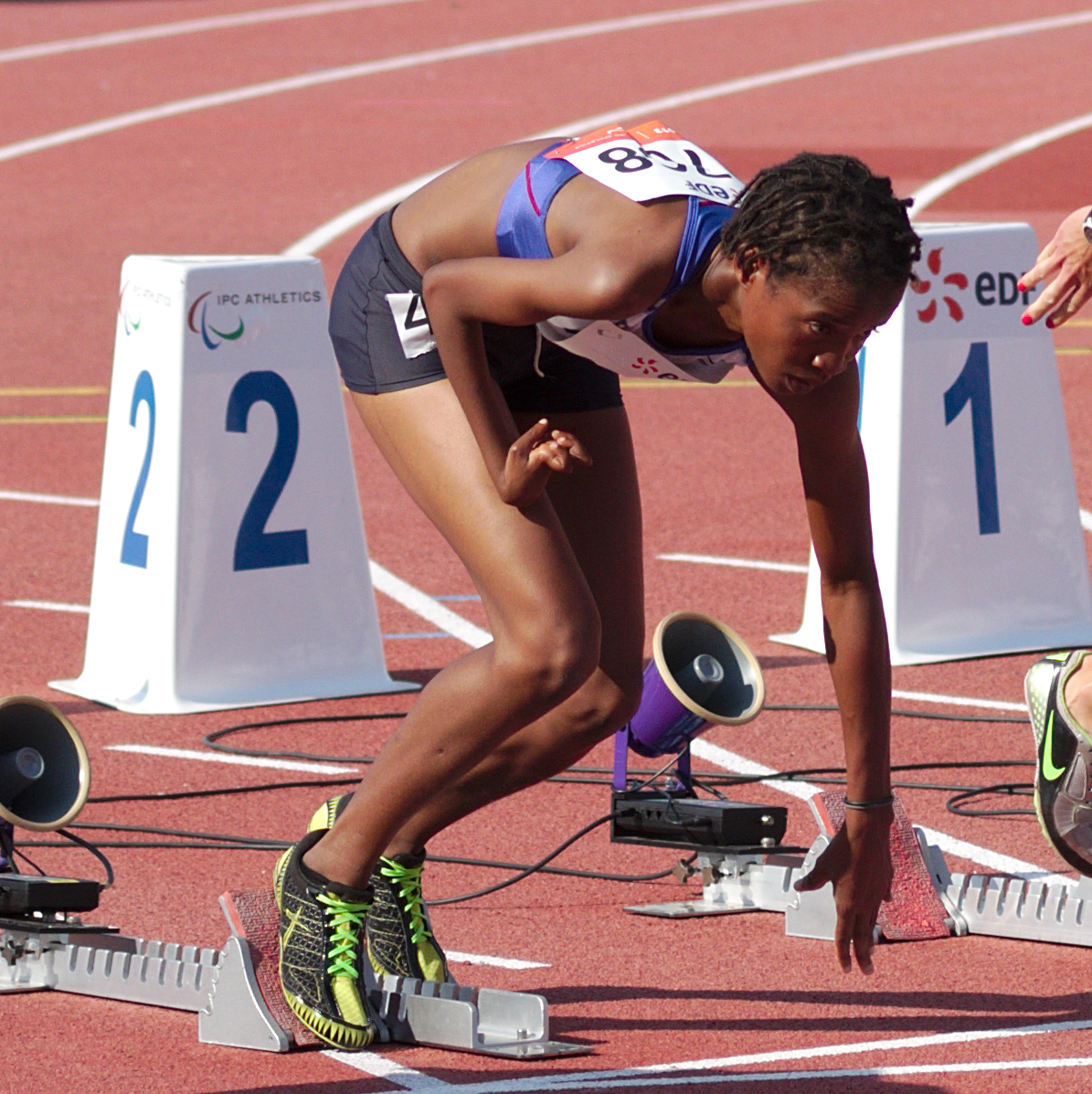
Albertina Johannes at the 2013 IPC Athletics World Championships

Albertina Johannes is a sprinter from Namibia.

Johannes has competed and won medals for the paralympic team of Namibia. Johannes has competed at Namibia's national championships.
