= SS Alberta =

SS Alberta is the name of the following ships:

- SS Alberta (1883), served with the Canadian Pacific Railway Upper Lake Service
- SS Alberta (1900), bombed and sunk in 1941

== See also ==
- Alberta (disambiguation)
- HMY Alberta
