= Trashcan Darlings =

American punk rock band

- Origin: Oslo
- Genres: Glam punk
- Years active: 1995–2008
- Labels: East Side Records
- Members: Strange? Gentle; Chris Damien Doll; Frankie Nachtnebel; Q. Ken Rockers; Andy Hunter
- Past members: Dan Dee; Skinny Shotgun; Eric Carr; Birdy
- Website: trashcandarlings.com MySpace; Label

Trashcan Darlings were a band from Oslo. They described themselves as the pioneers of Glamour-Punk and a mix of Ramones, Kiss, Sex Pistols and New York Dolls.

== Band history ==
The band was founded by Chris Damien Doll and Strange? Gentle in 1995. Their debut single "I Just Wanna Die (On A Chemical High)" was released in 1999. The same year they signed to a German record label (East Side Records). After that they toured through Germany, France and Austria.

Since 2000 they are also playing in Switzerland and the rest of Scandinavia. In the summer of 2008 the band announced their retirement, after singer Strange? Gentle said he wanted to quit the band due to lack of inspiration. The rest of the band did not want to continue without Strange? and split up. Their last show was in Oslo on December 13, 2008.

== Band Members ==
Current members

- Strange? Gentle – vocals
- Chris Damien Doll – guitar
- Frankie Nachtnebel – guitar
- Q. Ken Rockers – bass
- Andy Hunter – drums

Former members

- Dan Dee – bass
- Skinny Shotgun - drums
- Eric Carr - drums
- Birdy – guitar

== Discography ==
=== Albums ===
- Episode I: The Lipstick Menace – LP (2002; East Side Records; Germany)
- Episode I: The Lipstick Menace – CD (2004; East Side Records; Germany)
- Episode I: The Lipstick Menace - CD (2005; Wizzard In Vinyl; Japan)
- Getting Away With Murder - CD (2006; East Side Records / StrangeDolls Records; Germany/Norway)
- Getting Away With Murder - PicLP (2007; East Side Records; Germany/Norway)

=== Singles ===
- "I Just Wanna Die (On A Chemical High)" -7” (1999; StrangeDolls Records; Norway)
- "Johnny Is A Drag-Queen" -7” (1999; Siri; Norway)
- "Gore Gore Boys And Splatter Pussies" -10” (2000; East Side Records; Germany)
- "Gore Gore Boys And Splatter Pussies" -MCD (2000; StrangeDolls Records; Norway)
- "Holiday In My Head" -EP (2001; East Side Records; Germany)
- "Trashcan Darlings / Silver -Split 7"(2002; StrangeDolls Records; Norway)
- Trashcan Darlings / The Revolvers -Split EP (2003; East Side Records; Germany)
- "Tunes From The Trashcan" -7"(2004; East Side Records; Germany)
- "Tunes From The Trashcan" -MCD (2004; StrangeDolls Records; Norway)

=== Compilations ===
- Real Fucking Make-Up -CD (2008; StrangeDolls Records; Norway)

=== DVD ===
- 10 Years Of Trash - (2005; StrangeDolls Records; Norway)
