= Albertina Martínez Burgos =

Chilean photojournalist (1981-2019)

Albertina Martínez Burgos (March 14, 1981 – November 21, 2019) was a Chilean photojournalist.

== Biography ==
Albertina Mariana Martínez Burgos was born March 14, 1981. She moved to Santiago from southern Chile in 2009 to pursue a career in photography. In her early career, she worked at Chile's main daily newspaper, El Mercurio, and later worked as a lighting assistant for the Chilean television channel, Mega, and as a freelance photojournalist. Martínez was involved in demonstrations against the Carabineros de Chile, following their repression and abuse against demonstrators in the protests against the government of Sebastián Piñera in November 2019. She also covered "violence against women during protests". Her private Instagram showed photos of masked protestors in the week before her death.

== Death ==
She was found dead in her apartment in Santiago on November 21, 2019. She had been stabbed and beaten, and her photography equipment was missing from her home. Her body was discovered by her boyfriend's mother after he was unable to contact her; with the help of a locksmith the mother was able to enter the apartment and found Burgos dead. The timing of her death and her missing equipment prompted suspicion that she was targeted because of her protest coverage. After her death, the photojournalist group Frente Fotograficó shared her pictures from the protests on social media with the hashtag #JUSTICIAPARAALBERTINA.
