= Gaston Feuillard =

Gaston Feuillard (14 April 1904, Anjouan, Comoros – 13 March 1978, Paris) was a politician from Comoros who represented Guadeloupe in the French National Assembly from 1958-1973.
