= Alberta Kinsey =

American painter

- Born: 1875; West Milton, Ohio, U.S.
- Died: April 23, 1952; New Orleans, Louisiana, U.S.
- Occupation: Painter

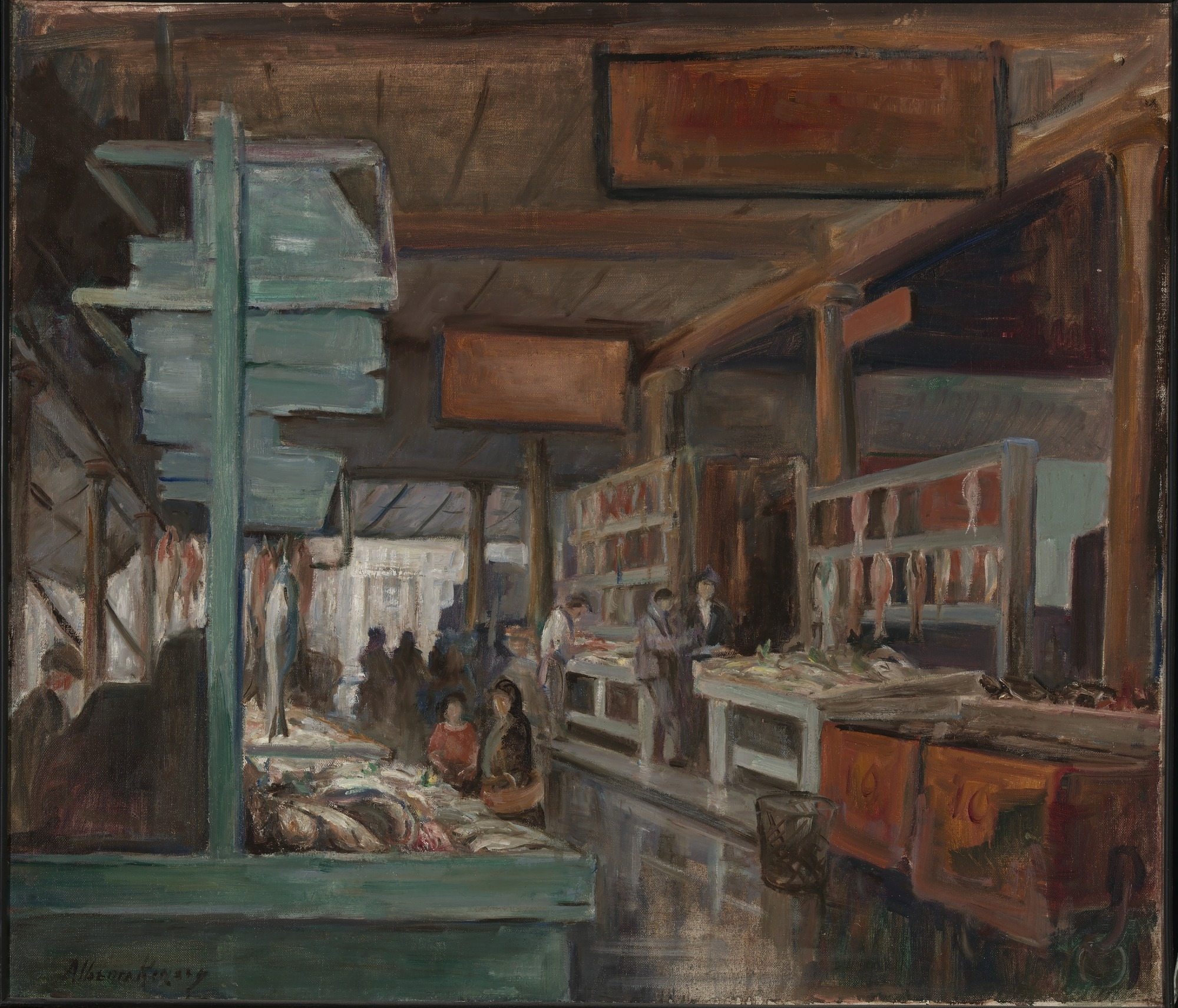
Fish Market (1934), painting by Alberta Kinsey for the Public Works of Art Project

Alberta Kinsey (1875 - April 23, 1952) was an American painter. Born in West Milton, Ohio, she was trained in New Orleans, France and Italy. She taught at Wilmington College and became an artist in New Orleans' French Quarter. Her work can be seen at the Smithsonian American Art Museum.
