= Alberta Plateau =

Plateau in Canada

- Plateau
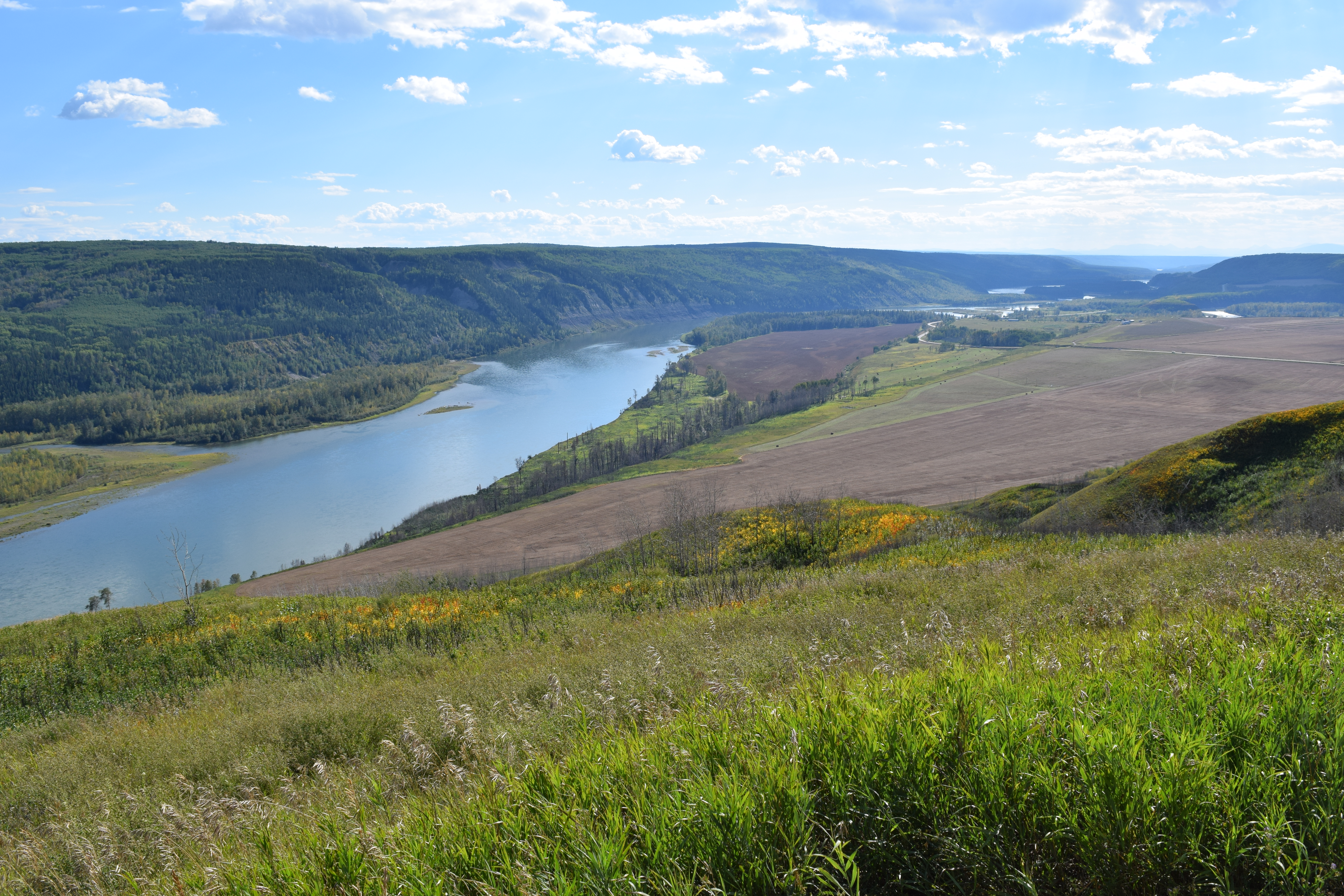
- The Alberta Plateau cut by Peace River valley in British Columbia

- Location in British Columbia
- Coordinates: 57°59′59″N 122°00′05″W
- Location: Alberta and British Columbia
- Part of: Interior Plains

The Alberta Plateau is a flat and gently rolling upland in Northern Alberta and in the northeastern corner of British Columbia, Canada. It ranges in elevation from about 910 to 1,220 metres (3,000 to 4,000 feet) and lies in the middle of the Interior Plains, one of seven physiographic regions in Canada. The Alberta Plateau is east of the Rocky Mountain Foothills and is subdivided into multiple smaller plateaus by wide intervening valleys; the two main valleys are the Fort Nelson River and Peace River lowlands. Underlying the Alberta Plateau are flat-lying beds of sandstone, shale and conglomerate which were deposited during the Mesozoic. The Alberta Plain, which extends southeastward to the Canada–United States border, is a flatter extension of the Alberta Plateau.

A steep escarpment forms the western plateau boundary; the Alaska Highway extends along the western edge of the Alberta Plateau between Dawson Creek and Fort Nelson. The northern boundary is a discontinuous escarpment overlooking the Great Slave Plain but elsewhere the Alberta Plateau boundary is less defined. To the northeast, the boundary extends around the Birch Hills and then continues south along the Athabasca River valley. The Alberta Plateau then crosses the Athabasca River valley to include the Cheecham Hills. To the southeast, the boundary extends past Pelican Mountain and Swan Hills where it generally extends southward along the Athabasca River to merge with the Canadian Cordillera.

The name of the plateau was proposed by Stuart Holland who was Chief Geologist of the Government of British Columbia until his retirement in 1974. It was officially adopted 2 November 1964 but was rescinded 21 March 1978 after British Columbia recommended its cancelation and removal from standard topographic maps in 1974. The reason for this was that the name was not used or recognized by the general public; the Alberta Plateau was named and delineated for use by geologists. As of 2024, the name of the plateau remains unofficial.

== See also ==
- List of plateaus in British Columbia
