= Albertina Ramírez =

Servant of God Albertina Ramírez SMCR
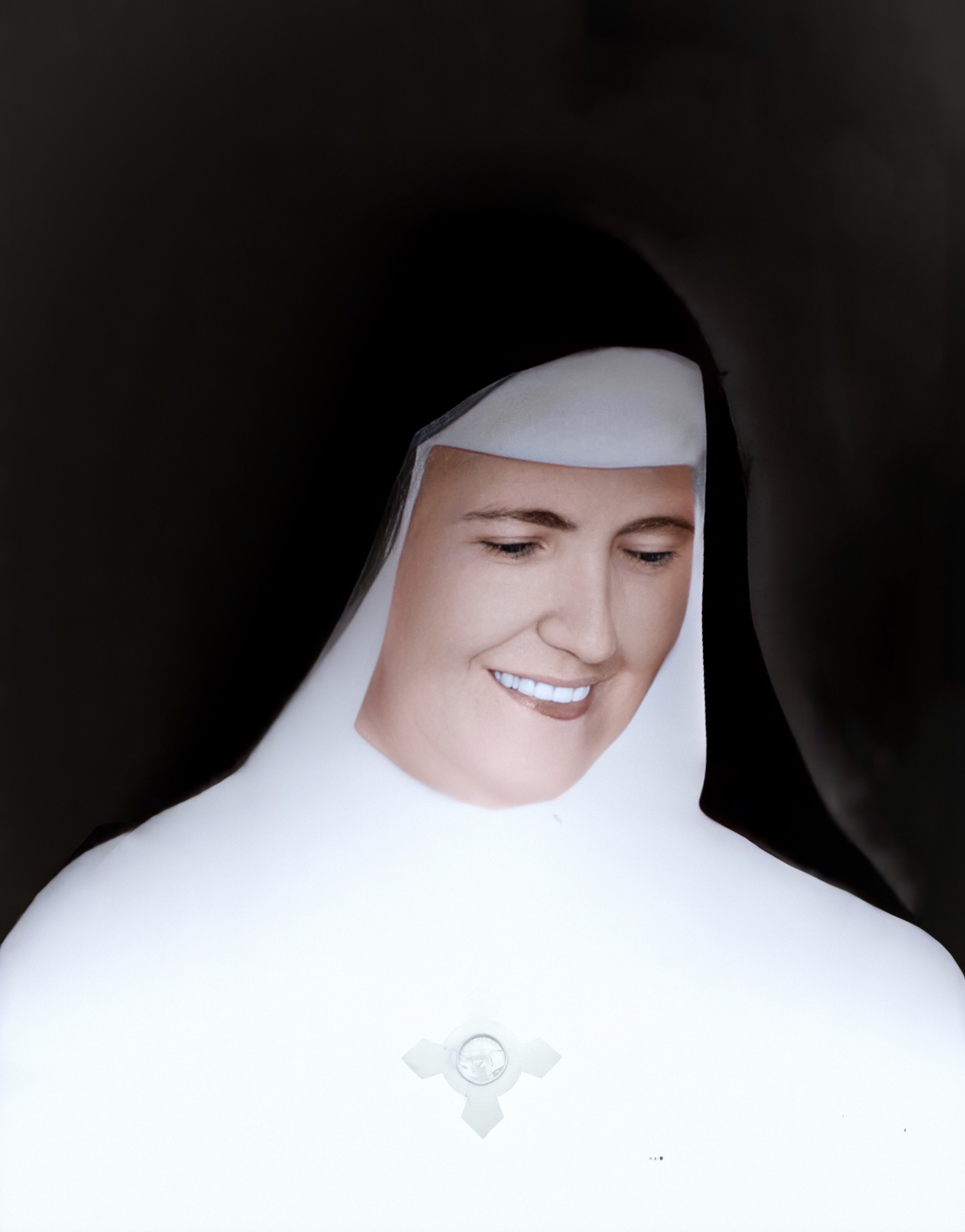
- Born: María Albertina Prudencia Ramírez Martínez; 28 April 1898; Managua, Nicaragua
- Died: 20 July 1979 (aged 81); Granada, Nicaragua
- Known for: Founder of the Missionary Servants of Christ the King
- Parents: Alberto Cristóbal Ramírez Briones (father); Leonor Martínez Solórzano (mother)

María Albertina Prudencia Ramírez Martínez, SMCR, also known as Madre Albertina (28 April 1898 – 20 July 1979), was a Nicaraguan Catholic mystic and religious leader who founded the Missionary Servants of Christ the King, the Madre Albertina Sisters, and the Servants of Jesus Christ, King of the Universe.

== Biography ==
María Albertina Prudencia was born on 28 April 1898, the penultimate of the children of Leonor Martínez Solórzano and Alberto Cristóbal Ramírez Briones. (Note: Through her mother, Prudencia was the granddaughter of Tomás Martínez and descended directly from Rafaela Herrera, defender of the Fortress of the Immaculate Conception, and Francisco de Paula Santander.) She was baptized on 9 May 1898 in the Old Cathedral of Managua and her Confirmation in 1904 at the Cathedral of León and, finally, First Communion in the same parish as her baptism on 4 December 1910.

To this end, Prudencia founded the Nazareth House for disadvantaged girls in 1935 (closed in 1943) and the Association of Missionary Servants of Christ the King in 1943, which would receive Papal approval in 1946. In 1952, the Unión de Mujeres Americanas recognized Prudencia's work and dubbed her a "Prominent Woman of Nicaragua" for her social work.

Mother Prudencia died on 20 July 1979 in Granada, Nicaragua. Twenty years after her death, on 17 October 2001, the Diocese of Granada began the process of canonization for Mother Prudencia and on 19 November it was approved with the nihil obstat.

== See also ==
- Catholic Church in Nicaragua
