= Burtina =

Scientific classification
- Kingdom: Animalia
- Phylum: Arthropoda
- Clade: Pancrustacea
- Class: Insecta
- Order: Lepidoptera
- Family: Geometridae
- Subfamily: Ennominae
- Genus: Burtina; Walker, [1865]

Genus of moths

Burtina is a genus of moths in the family Geometridae.

== Species ==
- Burtina atribasalis (Warren, 1899)
- Burtina continua Walker, [1865]
