= Birdie Draper =

Parachutist and stunt performer

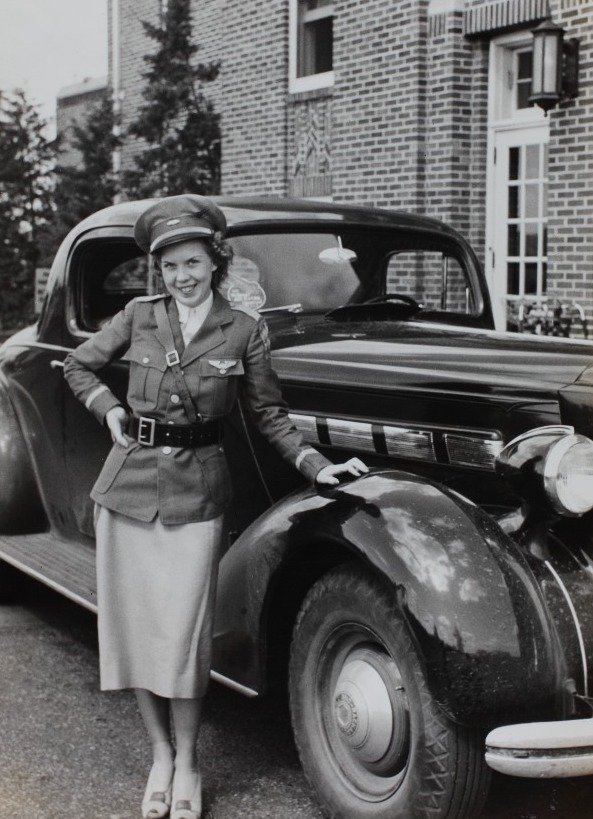
Birdie Draper in Minneapolis, September 1938.

Birdie Viola Draper (1916–2005) was a parachutist and stunt performer who made her first jump on June 6, 1937. She traveled around the country as a member of the Thrill Day Performers and became known as the "Queen of the Daredevils."

== Early life ==
Draper was born in Minneapolis, Minnesota in 1916. In 1937 at the age of 20, Draper began her training as a parachutist with Stub Chrissinger, an instructor for Hincks flying service and one of two licensed parachute riggers in Minnesota.

== Career ==
After her training, Draper joined the stunt group Thrill Day Performers traveling to state fairs. She was paired up with Captain F. F. "Bowser" Frakes who was best known for his daring plane crashing stunts and was known as the "Monarch of the Air." Draper was recognized for crashing through sixteen sticks of dynamite with her car, as well as solid masonry walls, a stunt for which she received $42.50.

By 1940, Draper completed thirty-five parachute jumps. She retired in 1941 as a daredevil once she received her license as a parachute rigger from the Department of Commerce. Shortly afterwards she took a position as a rigger for Ryan Aeronautical Company. Draper married George Griffin, a local attorney, and retired from Ryan Aeronautical Company in 1945.

Draper died on November 1, 2005.
