= Alberta Virginia Scott =

American educator (c. 1875 – 1902)

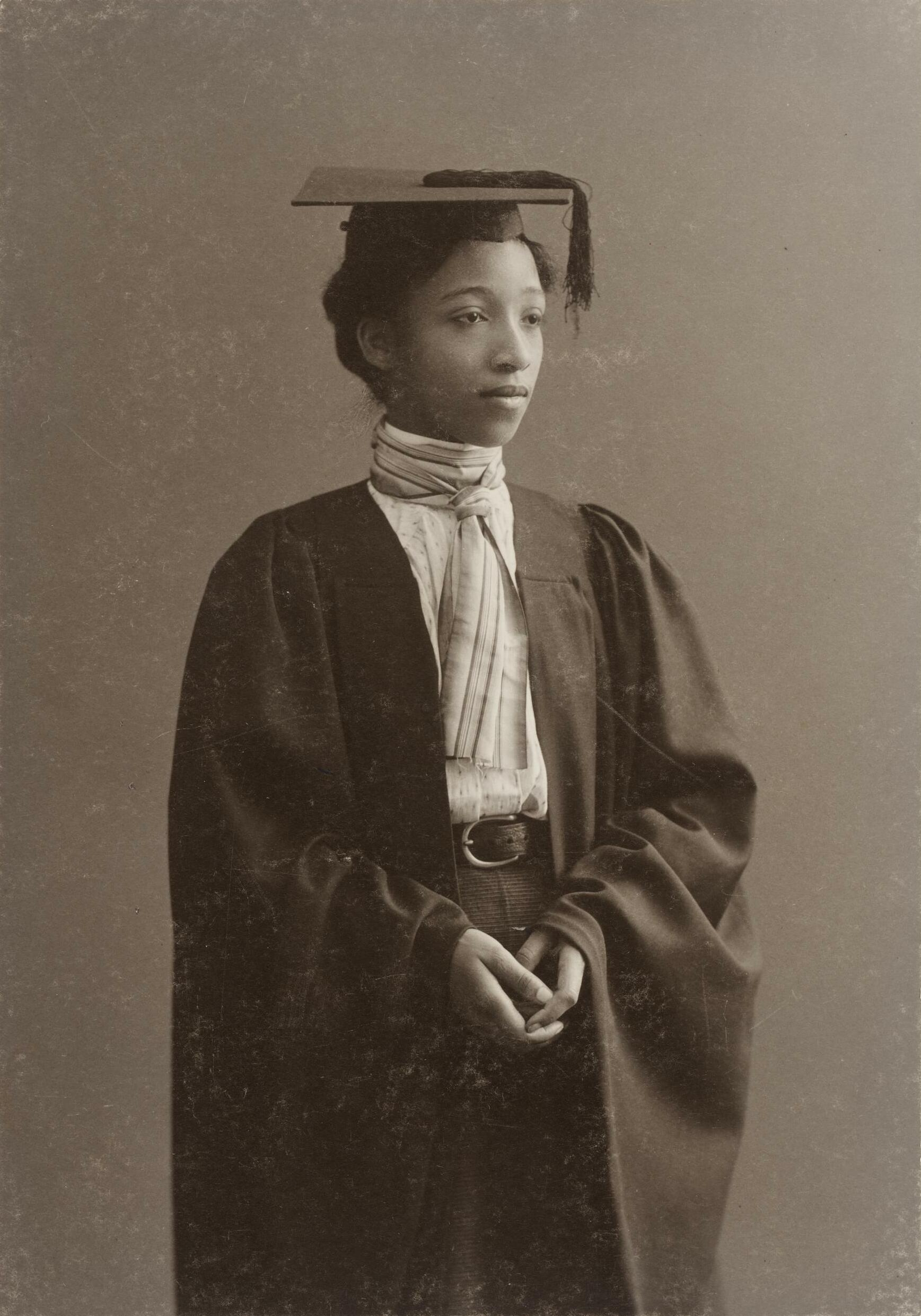
Portrait of Alberta Virginia Scott, ca. 1898. (15123985526)

Alberta Virginia Scott (c. 1875 — August 30, 1902) was an American educator. She was the first African-American graduate of Radcliffe College, in 1898.

== Early life ==
Alberta Virginia Scott was born near Richmond, Virginia. Her mother worked as a cook. She raised in Cambridge, Massachusetts, where her family moved when she was six years old. Her family were members of the historic Union Baptist Church in Cambridge. Scott attended Allston School (finishing in 1889) and then Cambridge Latin School, graduating with the class of 1894.

In 1898, Alberta Virginia Scott became the first African-American graduate of Radcliffe College.

== Career ==
Alberta Scott planned for a career in teaching. She taught in Indianapolis and, briefly, at Tuskegee Institute after graduating from Radcliffe.

== Death and legacy ==
Alberta Scott died in 1902, in Cambridge, aged 26 years after a 16 month illness attributed to overwork and grief after the loss of her father. "Her death cuts off what should have been a useful and creditable life of work among those of her race," concluded an obituary in a Cambridge newspaper.

There is a placard about Alberta V. Scott in Cambridge, placed by the Cambridge African American History Project in 1993. The Association of Black Harvard Women (ABHW) offers an Alberta V. Scott Mentorship Program, named in her honor.
