= Birdie Reeve Kay =

American champion typist (1907–1996)

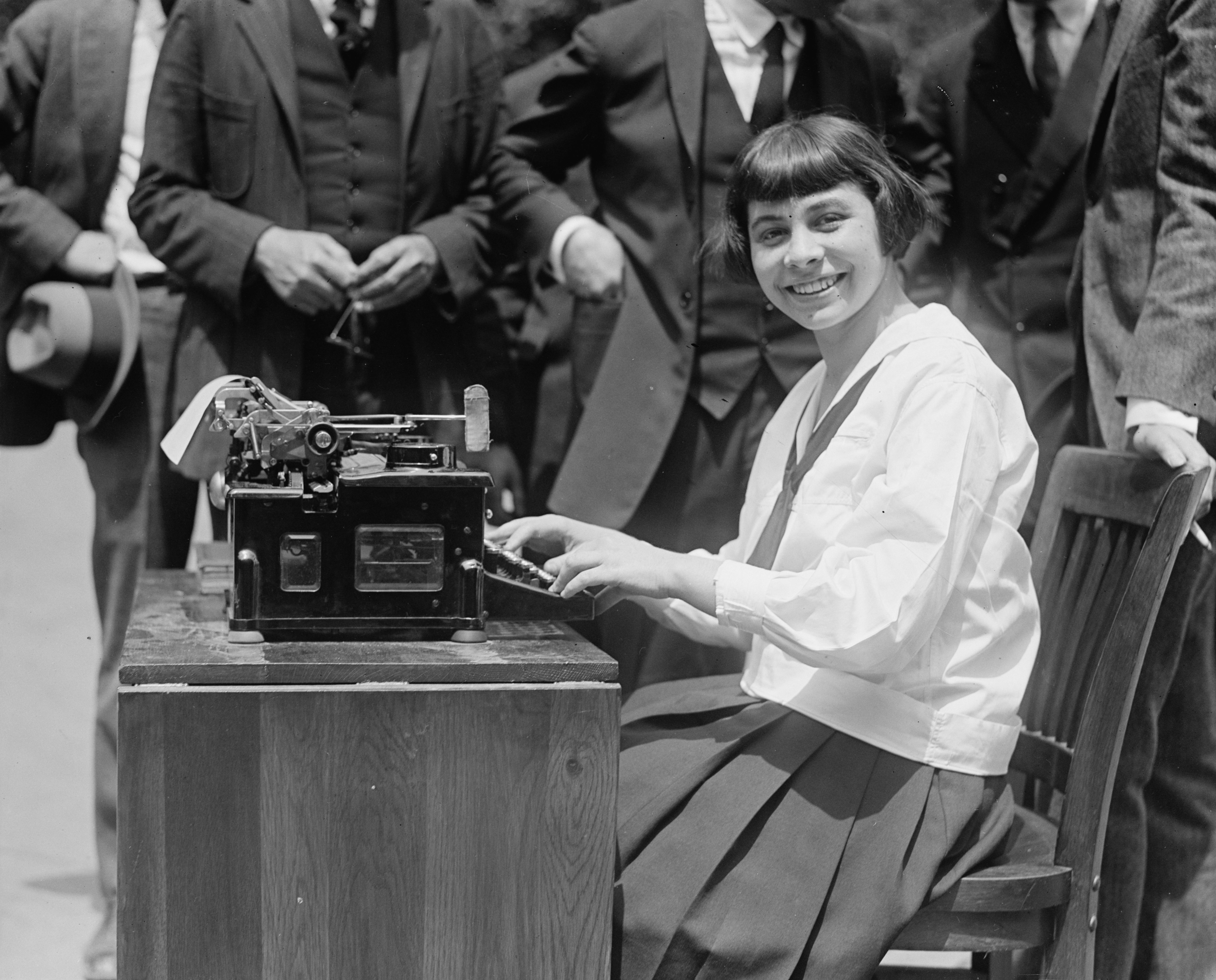
Birdie Reeve Kay, 1924

Birdie Reeve Kay, born Birdie Reeve (January 16, 1907 – May 31, 1996), was an American champion typist who performed in the 1920s in vaudeville.

She reached speeds of over 200 words, or 800 letters, per minute, and was billed as the "World's Fastest Typist". She used only two fingers of each hand, spread out in a V formation, in a typing system reportedly invented by her father Thomas Reeve. She explained that she achieved her speed by "studying words and not the typewriter", classifying words by their endings, and was reported to have a vocabulary of 64,000 words. She wrote several books on words. In 1924, she appeared at a gathering of the Associated Press to analyze a speech by then President Calvin Coolidge; she sorted the words used in the speech by length.

Her vaudeville act was mentioned in George Burns's 1989 book All My Best Friends. He wrote: "If you could do anything better, faster, longer, more often, higher, worse or differently than anyone else, you could work in vaudeville. For example, 'The World's Fastest Typist' had a great act. She'd type 200 words a minute, then pass the perfectly typed pages out to the audience to be inspected. For her finish she'd put a piece of tin in her typewriter and imitate a drum roll or the clackety-clack of a train picking up speed."

Kay also played chess as a teenager, and would give simultaneous exhibitions. She was reported as being one of the stronger female chess players of her time.

She had a daughter, Hope Hirschman, in 1931. She assumed the name Birdie Reeve Kay when she married Harry H. Kay. She later owned and operated a stenography business in Hyde Park, Chicago, and typed many theses for students at the University of Chicago.
