= Alberta Slim =

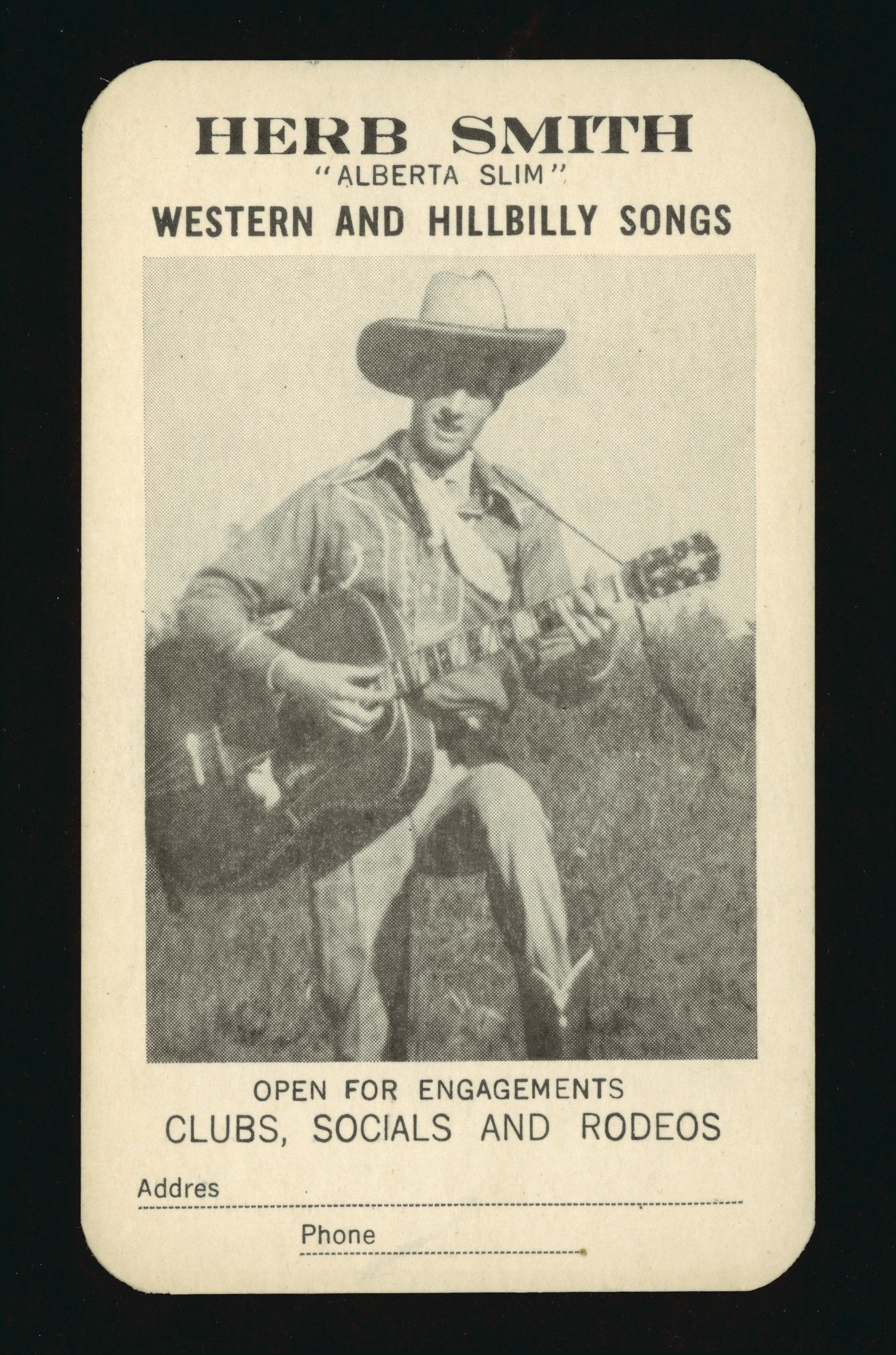
- Herb Smith "Alberta Slim" Western and Hillbilly Songs. University of Alberta Libraries Historical Postcard Collection

Background information
- Born: Eric Charles Edwards; February 2, 1910; Wiltshire, England
- Origin: Canada
- Died: November 26, 2005 (aged 95) Surrey, British Columbia, Canada
- Genre: Country
- Occupation: Singer
- Instrument: Guitar
- Years active: 1938-2003
- Label: RCA Victor

Alberta Slim (February 2, 1910 – November 26, 2005) was a Canadian country music singer.

== Biography ==
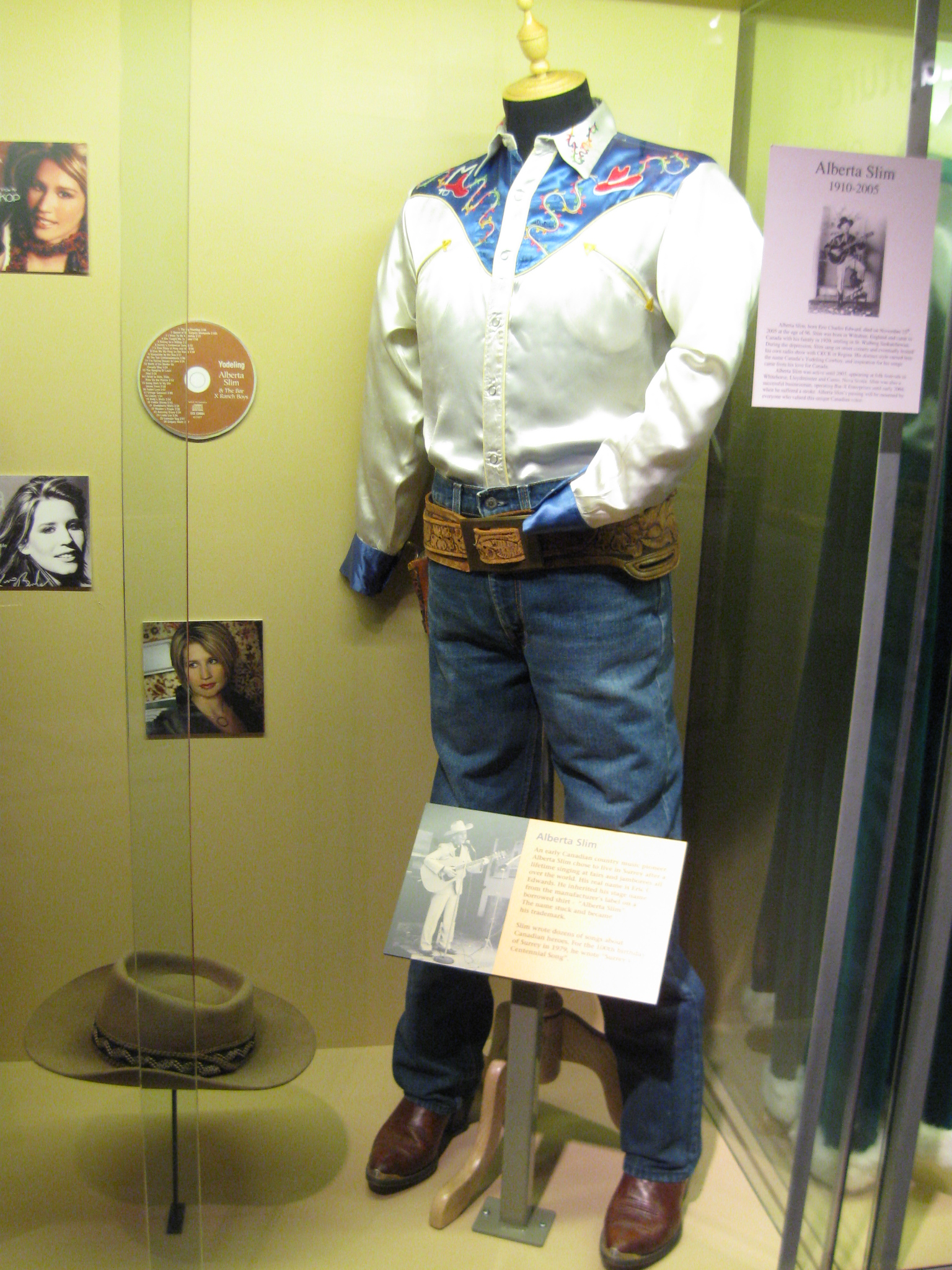
A cowboy costume of Alberta Slim on permanent display in the Surrey Museum of BC, Canada

Slim was born Eric Charles Edwards in Wiltshire, England, and emigrated with his family to Canada as a child. He was a hobo during the Great Depression, riding the railroads and playing on street corners as a guitarist and yodeler. He played in an amateur talent show at Regina station CKCK; soon after, in 1938, he was offered a job singing there. After this he held radio spots at CFQC in Saskatoon from 1940 to 1944, and then on Regina's CKRM from 1945 to 1947.

Slim started a traveling circus in the 1940s which included an elephant who could play harmonica, a singing dog, a chimpanzee on a bicycle, and a horse which Slim claimed could see the future. In 1949, he had his first hit on record, "When It's Apple Blossom Time in Annapolis Valley", released on Gavotte Records. Later, RCA Victor signed him and released songs such as "Waltz Evelina Waltz", "You Say I'm a Fool", "My Annapolis Valley Home", and "It's Too Late to Care".

After his career ended, he got a job in British Columbia selling real estate. In 1997, he was asked to perform again at the Vancouver Folk Festival. He continued to perform until he was 93. He died in 2005 at the age of 95 in Surrey, British Columbia, Canada.
