= Birdie, Georgia =

Unincorporated community in Georgia, U.S.

Coordinates: 33°19′11″N 84°20′40″W

Birdie is an unincorporated community in Spalding County, in the U.S. state of Georgia.

== History ==
A post office called Birdie was established in 1894, and remained in operation until 1905. Birdie was located inland away from railroads.
