= Albertina, Minas Gerais =

Town and municipality in the state of Minas Gerais, Brazil

Coordinates: 22°12′03″S 46°36′57″W

- Municipality
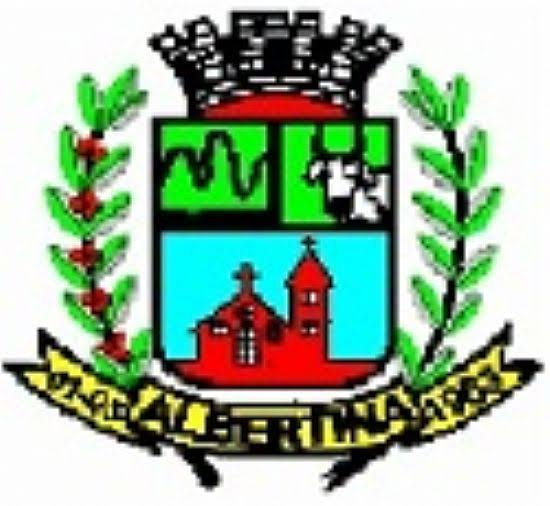
- Flag Coat of arms
- Interactive map of Albertina, Minas Gerais
- Country: Brazil
- State: Minas Gerais
- Region: Southeast
- Time zone: UTC−3 (BRT)

Location of Albertina

Albertina is a city in the Brazilian state of Minas Gerais. In 2020 its population was estimated to be 3,011.

Founded: 30 December 1962.

== See also ==
- List of municipalities in Minas Gerais
