= Alber =

Alber may refer to

- Alber (name)
- Alber, a term in the German school of fencing
- Alber & Geiger, European government relations law firm

== See also ==
- Albers
- Albert
