= Alber (name) =

Alber is a given name and a surname. Notable people with the name include:

== Given name ==
- Alber Elbaz (1961–2021), Moroccan-born Israeli fashion designer
- DJ Alber Ensso (born 1999), Armenian DJ and music producer
- Alber Gonsalves (born 1992), Indian footballer
- Alber Saber (born c. 1985), Egyptian computer science student and blogger

== Surname ==
- Arthur Alber (1892–1964), American attorney and member of the Los Angeles City Council
- Erdmute Alber (born 1963), German professor
- Frederick Alber (1838–1913), soldier in the American Civil War
- Jens Alber (born 1947), German sociologist and political scientist
- Jonas Alber (born 1969), German conductor and violinist
- Karl Alber (born 1948), German football player
- Laura J. Alber (born 1968), American businesswoman
- Mara Alber (born 2005), German footballer
- Mark Alber, American mathematician
- Matt Alber (born 1975), American singer-songwriter
- Reinhard Alber (born 1964), German cyclist
- Siegbert Alber (1926–2021), German politician

== See also ==
- Albert (name)
