= Alberts (name) =

Alberts is a Dutch and Afrikaans patronymic surname, meaning "son of Albert". Alberts is also a Latvian masculine given name, a cognate of the name Albert. People with the name Alberts include:

== Surname ==
- Al Alberts (1922–2009), American singer and composer
- Albert Alberts (1911–1995), Dutch writer, translator, and journalist.
- Allison Alberts (born 1960), American herpetologist and conservation biologist
- Andrew Alberts (born 1981), American ice hockey defenceman
- Anton Alberts (architect) (1927–1999), Dutch architect
- Anton Alberts (politician) (born 1970), South African lawyer and politician
- Bruce Alberts (born 1938), American biochemist; President of the National Academy of Sciences 1993–2005
- Bryan Alberts (born 1994), American–Dutch basketball player
- Butch Alberts (born 1950), American baseball player
- David S. Alberts (born 1942), American operations researcher
- Eunice Alberts (1927–2012), American opera singer
- Gert Alberts (1836–1927), South African trekker leader
- Gus Alberts (1861–1912), American baseball player
- Hendrik Alberts (1911-1995), South African military officer
- Jaco Alberts (born c. 1970), South African rugby player
- Jada Alberts, Australian writer, actor and artist
- John M. Alberts (1933-2015), American politician
- Jonathan Alberts, Canadian-American film editor
- Jos Alberts (born 1960), Dutch racing cyclist
- Jürgen Alberts (born 1946), German writer
- Marcie Alberts (born 1975), American basketball player and coach
- Mike Alberts, Connecticut politician
- Robert Alberts (born 1954), Dutch football midfielder and manager
- Sjaak Alberts (1926–1997), Dutch football defender
- Susan Alberts, American primatologist and anthropologist
- Trev Alberts (born 1970), American college football linebacker and sports administrator
- Willem Alberts (born 1984), South African rugby player
- Ziggy Alberts (born July 1994), Australian folk singer

== Given name ==
- Alberts Bels (1938–2024), Latvian writer
- Alberts Jērums (1919–1978), Latvian composer
- Alberts Krievs (1902–1971), Latvian wrestler
- Alberts Kviesis (1881–1944), Latvian president
- Alberts Ozoliņš (1896–1985), Latvian weightlifter
- Alberts Rumba (1892–1962), Latvian speed skater
- Alberts Šeibelis (1906–1972), Latvian footballer
- Alberts Tarulis (1906–1927), Latvian footballer
- Alberts Vaters (1905–1928), Latvian footballer

== Fictional characters ==
- Dian Alberts, Dutch soap opera fictional character

== See also ==
- Aalbers, surname
- Aalberts
- Albers, surname
- Albert (given name)
- Albertson (name), surname
- Alberts Frères, Dutch film production companies founded in 1899
