= Alpert =

Alpert is a variation of the Jewish surname Heilprin (Alprin), and may refer to:

== Given name ==
- Alpert of Metz (died 1024), Benedictine chronicler

== Surname ==
- Bradley Alpert, American computational scientist
- Craig Alpert, American film editor
- Daniel Alpert, American investment banker
- Dede Alpert (born 1945), American former politician
- Dov Alpert (1930–1963), Israeli writer
- Harry Alpert (1912–1977), American sociologist
- Herb Alpert (born 1935), American musician
- Hollis Alpert (1916–2007), American film critic and author
- Jane Alpert (born 1952), American radical who conspired in the bombings of eight New York City buildings in 1969
- Jenni Alpert, American pop singer-songwriter
- Jon Alpert (born c. 1948), American reporter and documentary filmmaker
- Joseph Alpert (born 1942), American cardiologist and professor of medicine
- Max Alpert (1899–1980), Soviet photographer
- Michael Alpert (born 1955), Jewish entertainer
- Mordechai Dovid Alpert (1850–1918), Lithuanian Jewish rabbi
- Nisson Alpert (1928–1986), rabbi, disciple of Moshe Feinstein
- Rebecca Alpert (born 1950), American Jewish reconstructionist-Judaism thinker
- Richard Alpert (1931–2019), American Jewish spiritual teacher and writer
- Richard Alpert (artist) (born 1947), American sculptor, abstract filmmaker, and performance artist
- Trigger Alpert (1916–2013), American jazz double-bassist
- Yakov Lvovich Alpert (1911–2010), Russian physicist

== Fictional characters ==
- Richard Alpert (Lost), in the American television series Lost

Alpert may also refer to:

- Alpert Awards in the Arts
- Alpert Medical School, Brown University, Providence, Rhode Island

== See also ==
- Halpert
- Albert (surname)
