= Albertson (name) =

Origin
- Meaning: son of Albert

Other names
- Variant forms: Albert, Alberts, Albertsen, Alverson

Albertson is an English language patronymic surname meaning "son of Albert" (Germanic origin, "noble-bright"). There are other spellings, including the Scandinavian Albertsen. While Albertson is a common surname, it is uncommon as a given name.

== Notable people with the surname ==
- Bethany Albertson, American political psychologist
- Charles W. Albertson (born 1932), American politician and musician
- Chris Albertson (1931–2019), American jazz journalist, writer and record producer
- Clayton Jordan "C.J." Albertson (born 1993), American long-distance runner
- Coit Albertson (1880–1953), American actor
- Frank Albertson (1909–1964), American character actor
- Jack Albertson (1907–1981), American actor and brother of Mabel
- Joe Albertson (1906–1993), American grocer (Albertsons chain) and philanthropist
- Johnny Albertson, American baseball player
- Kathryn Albertson (1908–2002), American philanthropist
- Lillian Albertson (1881–1962), US actress and theatre producer
- Mabel Albertson (1901–1982), US actress and sister of Jack
- Mary Albertson (1838–1914), American botanist and astronomer
- Nathaniel Albertson (1800–1863), American politician
- Nick Albertson (born 1983), American artist
- R. B. Albertson, American politician
- Tessa Albertson, American Actress
- William Albertson (1910–1972), American CPUSA leader

== Notable people with the given name ==
- Albertson Van Zo Post (1866–1938), American Olympic fencer and writer

== Fictional characters ==
- Jeff Albertson, better known as Comic Book Guy, a character from The Simpsons
- Tammy Jean Albertson, Glee character

== See also ==
- Alberts (name)
