= Alberts =

Alberts may refer to:

- Alberts (Australia), a company formerly known as Albert Music
- Alberts (name), a given name and surname
- The Alberts, a British musical comedy troupe
- Cork Alberts F.C., an Irish football club
- FK Alberts, a Latvian football club
- JDFS Alberts, a Latvian football club

== See also ==
- Albert (disambiguation)
- Albertson (disambiguation)
