= Albers =

Albers is a Dutch and Low German patronymic surname, meaning "Albert's son". Notable people with the surname include:

Academics

- Heinrich Albers-Schönberg (1865–1921), German gynecologist and radiologist
- de:Johann Abraham Albers (1772–1821), German physician
- Johann Christian Albers (1795–1857), German physician and malacologist
- de:Johann Friedrich Hermann Albers (1805–1867), German physician and pathologist
- Josef Albers (1888–1976), German artist, mathematician and educator
- Susanne Albers (born 1965), German computer scientist

Arts

- Anni Albers (1899–1994), German-American textile artist and printmaker
- Diana Albers, American comic book letterer
- de:Eef Albers (born 1951), Dutch guitarist
- Hans Albers (1891–1960), German actor and singer
- de:Henk Albers (1927–1987), Dutch comics artist and illustrator
- Henri Albers (1866–1926), born Johan Hendrik Albers, French operatic baritone of Dutch birth
- Hubertus Albers, (born 1965), German comedian
- Josef Albers (1888–1976), German-born American artist and educator
- Ken Albers (1924–2007), American singer who performed with The Four Freshmen, a male vocal band quartet
- Robin Albers (born 1958), Dutch house-music producer and DJ

Sports

- Andreas Albers (born 1990), Danish footballer
- Andrew Albers (born 1985), Canadian baseball pitcher
- Christijan Albers (born 1979), Dutch racing driver
- Jan Albers (born 1952), Dutch field hockey player
- Kristi Albers (born 1963), American golfer
- Marcel Albers (1967–1992), Dutch racing driver
- Matt Albers (born 1983), American baseball player
- Paul Albers (born 1985), Canadian ice hockey player

Politics, church and law

- James Albers, Canadian (Alberta) politician
- John Albers (born 1972), American (Georgia) politician
- Johannes Albers (1890–1963), German politician
- Joseph H. Albers (1891–1965), American Roman Catholic bishop
- Ronald E. Albers (born 1949), American judge
- Sheryl Albers (1954–2022), American (Wisconsin) politician
- W. W. Albers (1860–1951), American politician

Science

- Kathryn Albers, American professor of neurobiology and medicine

Other

- Albers Brothers Milling Company, a US west coast agricultural processing business

== See also ==
- Albers, Illinois, village in Clinton County, Illinois, United States
- Albers projection, conic, equal area map projection that uses two standard parallels
- Architype Albers, geometrically constructed stencil sans-serif typeface
- Aalbers
- Alberts (name)
