= Albert (surname) =

Albert is an English, Low German, French, Catalan, or Hungarian surname, derived from the Germanic personal name Albert, which was one of the most widely used Germanic personal names in the medieval period. It may refer to:

- Abel Albert (fl. 1900), an otherwise unidentified member of the gold medal-winning French 1900 Summer Olympics rugby union team
- Abraham Adrian Albert (1905–1972), American mathematician
- Akisha Albert, Curaçaoan beauty queen
- Alois Albert (1880–1939), German politician
- Aristide Elphonso Peter Albert (1853–1910) also known as A. E. P. Albert, American newspaper editor, theologian, professor, Methodist minister, and physician
- Augustine Albert (1791–1846), French opera singer
- Barbara Albert, Austrian film-producer and director
- Barbara Albert (chemist) (born 1966), German chemist
- Bernt Albert (born 1944), Norwegian politician
- Carl Albert (1908–2000), American politician
- Christian Albert (soldier) (1842–1922), American soldier
- Daniel Albert (footballer) (born 1971), Israeli football player
- Daniel G. Albert (1901–1983), New York politician and judge
- Daniel M. Albert (born 1936), American ophthalmologist and cancer researcher
- Darren Albert (born 1976), Australian rugby league player
- David Albert, American professor
- Delia Albert (born 1942), Filipino diplomat
- Eddie Albert (1906–2005), American actor
- Edward Albert (1951–2006), American actor, son of Eddie Albert
- Eugène Albert (1816–1890), Belgian clarinet maker
- Eugen d'Albert (1864–1932), Scottish pianist/composer
- Félicie Albert, French-born American physicist
- Flórián Albert (1941–2011), Hungarian football striker
- Frankie Albert (1920–2002), American NFL quarterback
- Hans Albert (1921–2023), German philosopher
- Heinrich Albert (1874–1960), German lawyer and spy
- Herman M. Albert (1901–1947), American lawyer and politician
- JD Albert (born 1975), American engineer, educator and inventor
- Jeff Albert (born 1980), American baseball coach
- Joan Albert (1943–2012), American artist
- Joey Albert (born 1960), Filipina singer-songwriter
- Jodi Albert (born 1983), British actress/singer
- John David Albert (1810–1899), mountain man
- Kenny Albert (born 1968), American sportscaster, son of Marv Albert
- Korbin Albert (born 2003), American women's soccer player
- Kurt Albert (1954–2010), German climber
- Laura Albert (born 1965), alleged American author of a literary hoax
- Laura Albert (academic), American operations researcher
- Marcelin Albert (1851–1921), French cafe owner who led the 1907 revolt of the Languedoc winegrowers.
- Marko Albert (born 1979), Estonian triathlete
- Marv Albert (born 1941), American sportscaster
- Michael Albert (born 1947), American author/editor
- Michel Albert (1930–2015), French economist
- Mildred Albert (1905–1991), American fashion show producer and radio and television personality
- Morris Albert (born 1951), Brazilian singer/songwriter
- Niels Albert (born 1986), Belgian cyclo-cross racing cyclist, World Champion cyclo-cross in 2009 and 2012
- Nina Albert, American urban planner
- Paul André Albert (1926–2019), American scientist
- Phil Albert (1944–2020), American football coach
- Philippe Albert (born 1967), Belgian football defender
- Roger Albert, American politician
- Réka Albert (born 1972), Romanian-Hungarian biologist and physicist
- Sergio Albert (born 1951), American football player
- Sophie Albert (born 1990), Filipina actress
- Stephen Albert (1941–1992), American composer
- Stew Albert (1939–2006), American activist
- Susan Wittig Albert (born 1940), American author
- Thérèse Albert (1805–1860), French actress
- Thomas Albert (composer) (born 1948), American composer and educator
- Wellington Albert (born 1994), Papua New Guinean Rugby League player
- Wilhelm Albert (disambiguation), several people with this name
- William Albert (1816–1879), American Congressman

== See also ==
- Albert (given name)
- Albert (disambiguation)
- Alpert
- Aubert
