= Albert =

Albert may refer to:

== Companies ==
- Albert (computer), a computer manufacturer in the 1980s
- Albert Czech Republic, a supermarket chain in the Czech Republic
- Albert Heijn, a supermarket chain in the Netherlands
- Albert Market, a street market in The Gambia
- Alberts (Australia), an Australian music company now known as Alberts
  - Albert Productions, a record label
- Albert (organisation), an environmental organisation concerning film and television productions

== Entertainment ==
- Albert (1985 film), a Czechoslovak film directed by František Vláčil
- Albert, a 2015 film by Karsten Kiilerich
- Albert (2016 film), an American TV movie
- Albert (Albert King album), 1976
- Albert (Ed Hall album), 1988
- "Albert" (short story), by Leo Tolstoy
- Albert (comics), a character in Marvel Comics
- Albert (Discworld), a character in Terry Pratchett's Discworld series
- Albert, a character in Dario Argento's 1977 film Suspiria

== People ==
- Albert (given name)
- Albert (surname)
- Prince Albert of Saxe-Coburg and Gotha
- Albert (dancer) (François-Ferdinand 1789–1865), French ballet dancer
- Albert, a ring name of professional wrestler Matt Bloom (born 1972)

== Places ==
=== Canada ===
- Albert (provincial electoral district, 1846–1973), a provincial electoral district in New Brunswick from 1846 to 1973
- Albert (federal electoral district), a federal electoral district in New Brunswick from 1867 to 1903
- Albert-Riverview, a provincial electoral district in New Brunswick
- Albert County, New Brunswick
- Rural Municipality of Albert, Manitoba, Canada

=== United States ===
- Albert, Kansas
- Albert Township, Michigan
- Albert, Oklahoma
- Albert, Texas, a ghost town
- The Albert (Detroit), formerly the Griswold Building, an American apartment block

=== Elsewhere ===
- Albert (Belize House constituency), a Belize City-based electoral constituency
- Albert, New South Wales, a town in Australia
- Electoral district of Albert, a former electoral district in Queensland, Australia
- Albert, Somme, a French commune

== Transportation ==
- Albert (automobile), a 1920s British light car
- Albert (motorcycle), a 1920s German vehicle brand
- Albert (tugboat), a 1979 U.S. tugboat

== Other ==
- 719 Albert, Amor asteroid
- Albert (crater), a lunar crater
- ALBERT, a variant of the language model BERT
- The Albert, a pub in London
- Albert and Alberta Gator, mascots for the Florida Gators

== See also ==
- Alberta (disambiguation)
- Alberts (disambiguation)
- Alberte (born 1963), a Danish singer and actress
- Albertet, a diminutive of Albert
- House of Albret, a seigneurie in Landes, France
- Aubert, an Anglo-Saxon surname
- Lake Albert (disambiguation)
- Victoria and Albert (disambiguation)
