= Richard Alpert (disambiguation) =

Richard Alpert (1931–2019) was an American former psychology researcher, and later spiritual teacher and author, better known as Ram Dass.

Richard Alpert may also refer to:

- Richard Alpert (artist) (born 1947), American sculptor, abstract filmmaker, and performance artist
- Richard Alpert (Lost), a fictional character played by Nestor Carbonell in the American ABC television series Lost
