= Albertsen =

Albertsen is a Nordic surname. Notable people with the surname include:

- Albert Albertsen, Danish football executive
- Georg Albertsen (1889–1961), Danish gymnast
- Heidi Albertsen (born 1976), Danish model
- Johnny Albertsen (born 1977), Danish alpine skier
- Martin Albertsen (born 1974), Danish handball coach
- Pål Henning Albertsen, Norwegian football goalkeeper and coach
- Per Hjort Albertsen, Norwegian composer
- Roger Albertsen (1957–2003), Norwegian footballer
- Tine Rustad Albertsen, Norwegian handball player
- Ubbo J. Albertsen (1845–1926), American politician and businessman

== See also ==
- Albertson (disambiguation)
