= Albertson =

Albertson(s) may refer to:

- Albertson (name), a given name or surname (including a list of people with the name)
- Albertsons, an American grocery company based in Boise, Idaho
- Albertson, New York, a hamlet and census-designated place in Nassau County, New York, US
- Albertson Brook, a waterway in New Jersey, US
- Albertson College of Idaho, former name of the College of Idaho in Caldwell, Idaho, US

== See also ==
- Albertson v. Subversive Activities Control Board, a 1965 US Supreme Court decision
- Albertsen, a surname (including a list of people with the name)
