= Wilhelm Albert =

Wilhelm Albert may refer to:

- Wilhelm Albert (engineer) (1787–1846), also Julius Albert, German mining administrator, engineer and inventor
- Wilhelm Albert (SS officer) (1898–1960), German SS officer
- Wilhelm Albert (Wehrmacht officer) (1917–2004), German Wehrmacht officer
- Wilhelm Albert, Duke of Urach (born 1957), German Duke of Urach and engineer

== See also ==
- Albert (surname)
