= Lake Albert =

Lake Albert or Albert Lake may refer to:

- Lake Albert (Africa), one of the African Great Lakes
- Lake Albert (South Australia), a lake
  - Lake Albert, South Australia (locality), a locality
- Lake Albert, New South Wales, a suburb of Wagga Wagga, New South Wales
  - Lake Albert (New South Wales), a lake located in the suburb of the same name
- Albert Park and Lake, Victoria, Australia
- Albert Lake, Blue Earth County, Minnesota, United States
- Albert Lake (Douglas County, Minnesota)
- Lake Albert (Kingsbury County, South Dakota), a lake in Kingsbury County, South Dakota, U.S. near Badger

== See also ==
- Lake Abert, in the U.S. state of Oregon, previous higher stand called Lake Cheuwaukan
