= Nick Albertson =

American artist

- Born: November 13, 1983 (age 42); Boston, Massachusetts, United States
- Education: Bard College; Columbia College Chicago
- Website: www.nickalbertson.com

Nick Albertson (born 1983 in Boston, MA) is a Chicago-based artist.

== Themes ==
Primarily utilizing a Toyo-Field 45CF 4-by-5 camera, Nick Albertson's work combines photography, video, and sculptural forms. Albertson's recent body of work utilizes the repetitive patterning of everyday household items such as rubber bands, cups, straws, paper napkins, and plastic bags. When framed through Nick Albertson's photographic lens, these mundane objects undergo a transformation. Through patterning, light and shadow, sculptural formations, and post-production editing, Albertson's work blurs the lines between abstraction and representation, playing to the repetitive nature of the objects in question and the viewer's familiarity with common household products. "In my work, I strip utilitarian objects of their functions, repurposing them to create visceral experiences." One reviewer noted that in some of Albertson's works, it is obvious to tell which household or office item he is utilizing in his works. Others, not so much. The repeated motif leads towards abstraction in a way that is both mesmerizing and deceptive.

== Education and career ==
In 2006, he received his Bachelor of Arts in Photography from Bard College (Annandale-On-Hudson, NY) and his Masters of Fine Arts from Columbia College (Chicago, IL) in 2013.

Albertson is represented by Aspect/Ratio Gallery in Chicago, IL. His work has been exhibited in Chicago, Seattle, and New York, as well as internationally at the Pingyao International Photo Festival in Pingyao, China. His work is part of private collections as well as the collection of Columbia College Chicago.

== Awards and honors ==
He was the recipient of the Bard College Photography Advisory Board Scholarship (2005), the Follett Fellowship Scholarship (2006), the Albert P. Weisman Award (2011, 2012), the AGROUND: 16th Annual Photo Competition Exhibition, Photo Center NW, Seattle, WA (2011, Honorable Mention), the Union League Civic & Arts Foundation Visual Arts Competition, the Stuart and Iris Baum Project Completion Grant (finalist), the Capsim Student Award, and the Bridgeport Art Center Exhibition Award (2013).
