= Albert (tugboat) =

Tugboat operating on North American Great Lakes

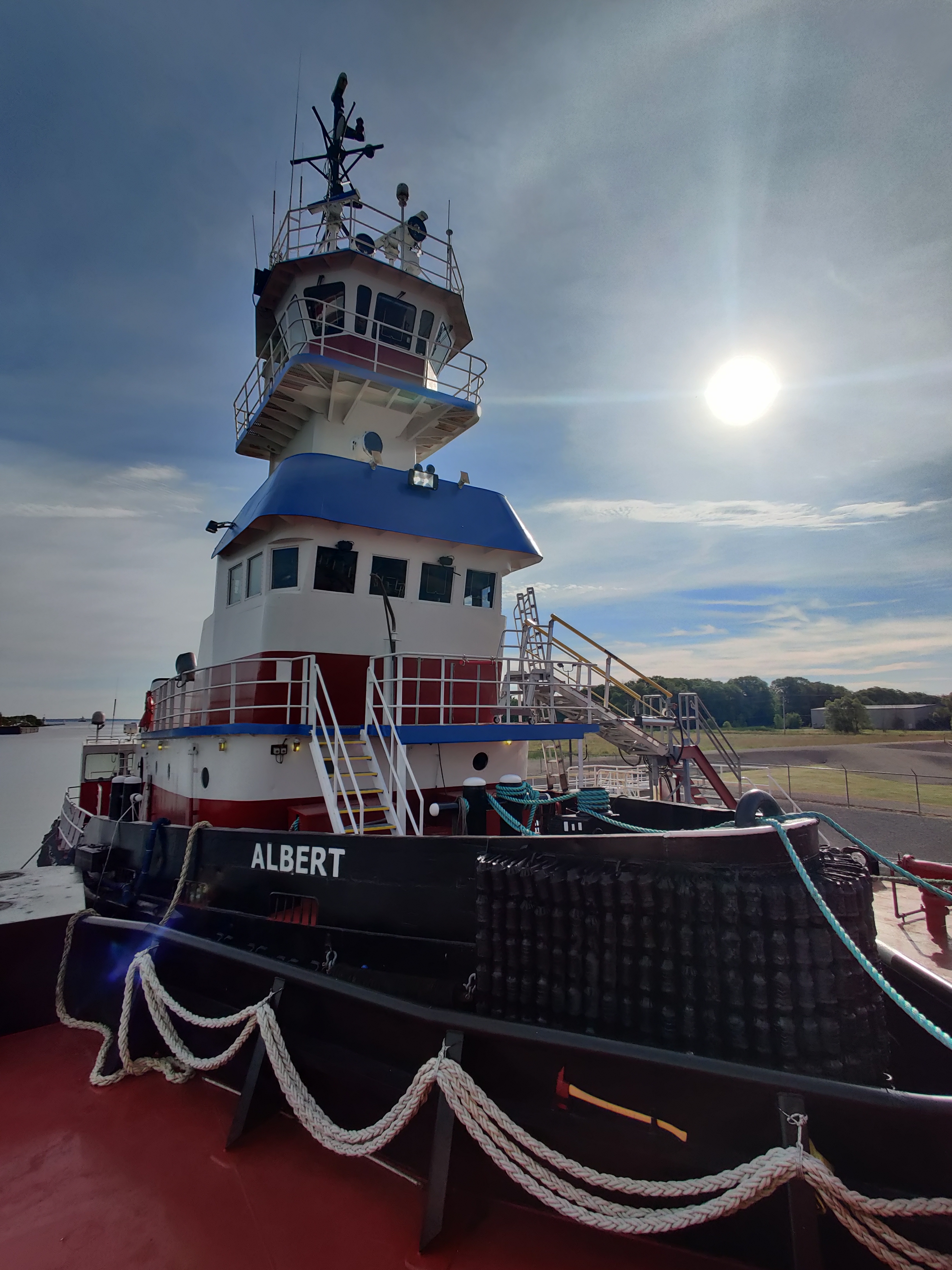
- Albert docked in Cheboygan, Michigan

History
- Name: Hercules (1979–1981); El Bronco Grande (1981–2006); Craig Eric Reinauer (2006–2018); Albert (2018–present)
- Owner: U.S. Oil
- Operator: Andrie Inc.
- Port of registry: Green Bay, Wisconsin, US
- Builder: American Gulf Shipyard Inc.
- Identification: MMSI number: 367159020; Callsign: WDK3153
- Status: In service

General characteristics
- Length: 114.5 ft (34.9 m)
- Beam: 35 ft (11 m)
- Installed power: 4,000 hp (3,000 kW)

Albert is a U.S.-flagged tugboat owned by U.S. Oil and operated by Andrie. Albert is paired with the tank barge Margaret and transports petroleum products to ports along the Great Lakes and St. Lawrence River.

== History ==
This tug now known as Albert was originally built and named Hercules by American Gulf Shipyard in Larose, Louisiana in 1979. Before construction of the vessel was completed, Hercules was acquired in 1981 by Tidewater Marine of New Orleans, Louisiana. There she was renamed El Bronco Grande and operated for the company until she was taken out of service in 1999.

In 2006, the vessel was acquired by Reinauer Transportation of Staten Island, New York and renamed Craig Eric Reinauer. Under the ownership of Reinauer, she underwent a major refit including the replacement of her engines and generators, and the addition of a secondary, upper wheelhouse. In 2017, after sister tug Meredith C. Reinauer and barge RTC 150 ran aground in the Hudson River at Catskill, New York, Craig Eric Reinauer and barge RTC 103 were dispatched to transfer 60,000 barrels of gasoline off from RTC 150 to help free the tug and barge.

In 2018, she was acquired by U.S. Oil of Appleton, Wisconsin and renamed Albert. Along with the tug, U.S. Oil also acquired tank barge RTC 101 which they renamed to Margaret.
