= Nina Albert =

American urban planner

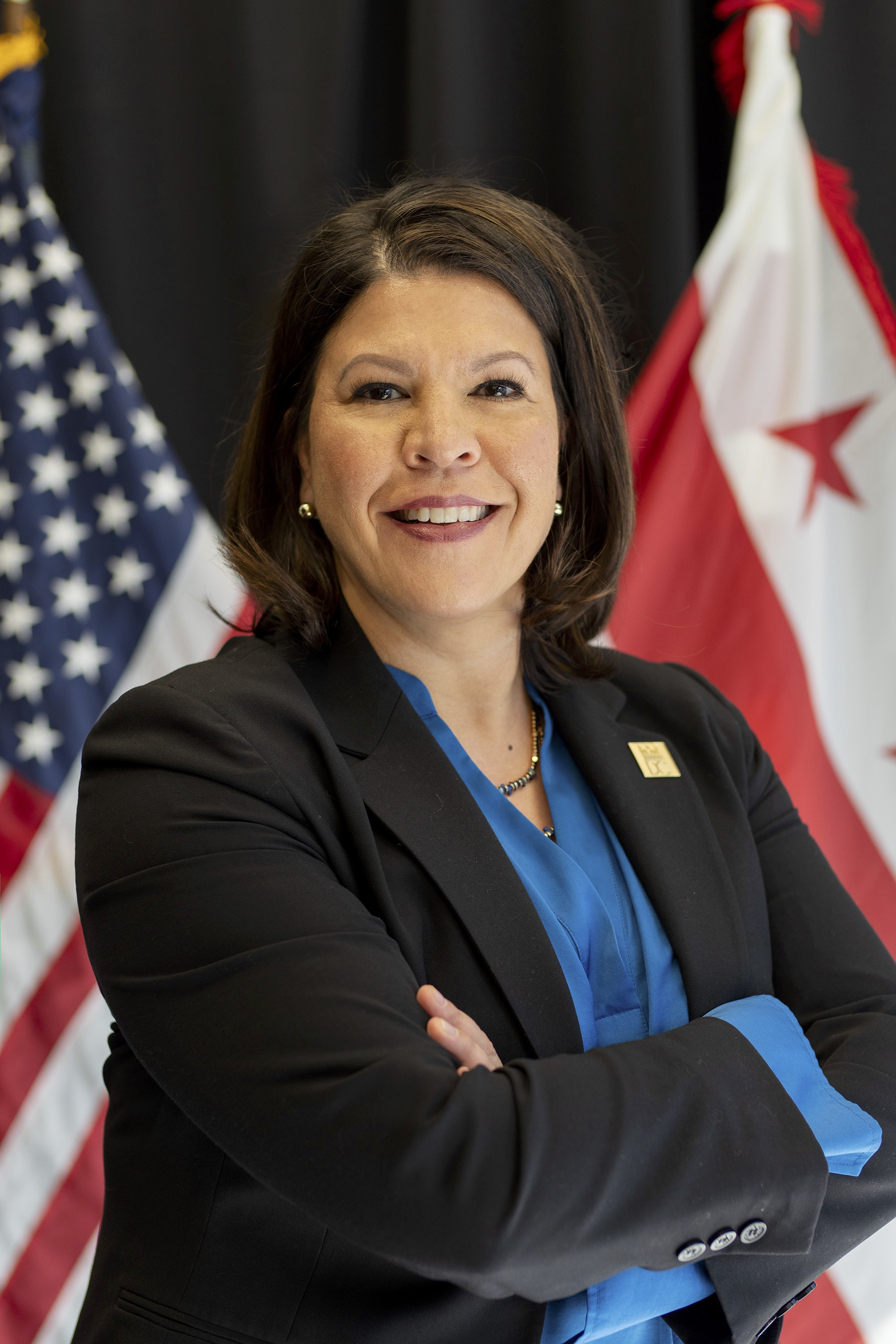

Deputy Mayor of the District of Columbia for Planning and Economic Development
- Acting
- Assumed office 2023
- Preceded by: John Falcicchio

Personal details
- Education: Tufts University; University of North Carolina at Chapel Hill

Military service
- Branch/service: U.S. Army
- Rank: First Lieutenant
- Unit: Signal Corps

Nina M. Albert is an American urban planner serving as the acting deputy mayor for planning and economic development of Washington, D.C. since 2023. She was commissioner of the Public Buildings Service from 2021 to 2023.

== Life ==
Albert earned a Bachelor of Science in Mechanical Engineering from Tufts University. She earned a Master of Business Administration and Master of City and Regional Planning from the University of North Carolina at Chapel Hill.

Albert served as a first lieutenant and Company Executive Officer of the United States Army Signal Corps. She worked in public real estate disposition, public-private partnership negotiations, economic revitalization, and sustainable development. In the late 2000s, Albert served as the Anacostia Waterfront initiative manager where she oversaw a $1.3 billion redevelopment project in Washington D.C., including a 2,800-acre waterfront revitalization program. While working at the District Department of Energy and Environment, Albert led the design and development of a $250 million energy efficiency financing program targeting commercial and multi-family property owners. Albert served as vice president of real estate and parking at the Washington Metropolitan Area Transit Authority (WMATA), where she managed a multi-billion dollar real estate portfolio.

In 2021, she was appointed the commissioner of the Public Buildings Service (PBS). She managed the nationwide asset management, design, construction, leasing, building management and disposal of approximately 371 million square feet of government-owned and leased space across the United States and six territories. Albert made the final decision to choose Greenbelt, Maryland as the site of the future headquarters of the FBI. Albert's decision overrode a unanimous recommendation from a board composed of career GSA and FBI officials, which suggested that Springfield, Virginia should instead be the site of the future FBI headquarters. FBI director Christopher Wray wrote an internal email to FBI employees raising concerns that the process was tainted by Albert's "potential conflict of interest" as a former vice president of WMATA, which would benefit from additional ridership at the Greenbelt stop. Virginia Senators Mark Warner and Tim Kaine, along with Virginia Governor Glenn Youngkin and eight members of the state's congressional delegation, stated the selection process was "irrevocably undermined and tainted" and called for the decision to be reversed. Supporters of the decision, including Maryland Governor Wes Moore and former House Majority Leader Steny Hoyer, along with GSA Administrator Robin Carnahan, defended the outcome, and the GSA posted a six-page memorandum responding to Wray's concerns, while also noting that previous panels within the GSA had unanimously recommended the Greenbelt site and rejected the Springfield site.

In 2023, Albert was appointed as the acting deputy mayor for planning and economic development of Washington, D.C. by mayor Muriel Bowser. She succeeds John Falcicchio.
