= Kathryn Albers =

American scientist

Kathryn M. Albers is an American professor of neurobiology and medicine at the University of Pittsburgh School of Medicine. She is known for her research on nerve growth and the impact on sensory nerve abilities undergoing disfunction.

== Early career and education ==
Albers obtained her Ph.D. from Stony Brook University in 1985. Following this, she finished her postdoctoral training at the University of Chicago in 1990 in cellular and molecular biology. She is a Fellow of the American Association for the Advancement of Science. Topics in her research involve the growth and growth factors of skin and nerves.

== Achievements ==
In 2011, Albers became a Helen H. Molinari Memorial Lecturer. In addition, since 1992, she has been a part of the society for neuroscience. Lastly, she has been a member of the American Association for the Advancement of Science since 2001.

== Selected publications ==
1. Albers, KM; Zhang, XL; Diges, CM; Schwartz, ES; Yang, CI; Davis, BM; Gold, MS (2014). "Artemin growth factor increases nicotinic cholinergic receptor subunit expression and activity in nociceptive sensory neurons". Mol Pain. 10 1744-8069-10-31: 31. doi:10.1186/1744-8069-10-31. PMC 4036648. PMID 24886596.
2. Margiotta, JF; Smith-Edwards, KM; Nestor-Kalinoski, A; Davis, BM; Albers, KM; Howard, MJ (2021). "Synaptic Components, Function and Modulation Characterized by GCaMP6f Ca(2+) Imaging in Mouse Cholinergic Myenteric Ganglion Neurons". Front Physiol. 12 652714. doi:10.3389/fphys.2021.652714. PMC 8365335. PMID 34408655.
3. Zhang, S; Edwards, TN; Chaudhri, VK; Wu, J; Cohen, JA; Hirai, T; Rittenhouse, N; Schmitz, EG; Zhou, PY; McNeil, BD; Yang, Y; Koerber, HR; Sumpter, TL; Poholek, AC; Davis, BM; Albers, KM; Singh, H; Kaplan, DH (2021). "Nonpeptidergic neurons suppress mast cells via glutamate to maintain skin homeostasis". Cell. 184 (8): 2151–2166.e16. doi:10.1016/j.cell.2021.03.002. PMC 8052305. PMID 33765440.
