= Alberts Tarulis =

Latvian footballer

Alberts Tarulis (1906 – 24 September 1927) was a Latvian football midfielder who had very promising prospects with the Latvia national football team but committed suicide aged just 21.

== Biography ==
Tarulis became a regular player with Amatieris - the oldest Latvian football club (all older football clubs in Latvia were dominated by the Germans or British) in 1925 as the club finished fourth in the Riga football league. By that time Amatieris was not an especially strong sports club as most of the better Riga footballers were playing with RFK or JKS Riga and Amatieris had only two stars left - Augusts Skiltriters and Pēteris Lauks. Despite his young age Tarulis soon became the leader of the club which finished third in the Riga league in 1926.

For the first time Tarulis was called up to the Latvia national football team before the 20 July 1926 international friendly against Sweden. He participated in a training match against LNJS Riga and scored one goal in it. However Tarulis was not selected to play against Sweden and had to await his international début for one more year.

In 1927 Tarulis participated in a friendly match where a combined Amatieris, LSB Riga and RFK squad played against the Czech club SK Židenice.

Tarulis played his first and only official international match for Latvia on 11 September 1927 as it lost 1–3 in a friendly against Finland in Helsinki.

Just three weeks later after a fight with his mother, he committed suicide by hanging himself.

== See also ==
- Football in Latvia
