= Mark Alber =

American mathematician

Academic background
- Education: Moscow Institute of Technology; University of Pennsylvania
- Doctoral advisor: Jerrold E. Marsden

Academic work
- Discipline: Mathematician
- Institutions: University of California, Riverside; University of Notre Dame

Mark Alber is an American mathematician working as a distinguished professor in the department of mathematics at the University of California, Riverside. He was previously the Vincent J. Duncan Family Professor of Applied Mathematics at the University of Notre Dame. In 2011, Alber was named a fellow of the American Association for the Advancement of Science.

Alber received an M.S. degree with honors in applied mathematics from the Moscow Institute of Technology in 1983. He then, in 1990, received a Ph.D. degree in mathematics from the University of Pennsylvania, where he was advised by Jerrold E. Marsden. From 1990 to 2016, he was on the faculty at the University of Notre Dame, ending his time there as Duncan Family Professor and director of the Interdisciplinary Center for the Study of Biocomplexity.

He joined the faculty at UC Riverside as a distinguished professor in 2016, and has directed the university's Center for Data-Driven Modeling in Biology since 2017. Alber's research includes mathematical modeling applications to researching organ formation, cancer development, and blood clotting.

Since 2010, he has served as an associate editor of the Bulletin of Mathematical Biology, and since 2022, he has been the section editor of systems biology for the journal PLOS Computational Biology.
