= Dian Alberts =

- Goede tijden, slechte tijden character
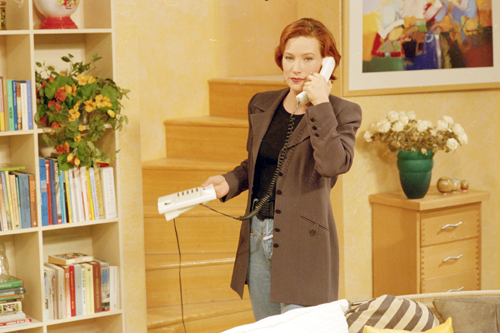
- Chris Jolles as Dian Alberts
- Portrayed by: Lotte van Dam (1991–1993, 1996); Chris Jolles (1994–1999); Rixt Leddy (2005–2008)
- Duration: 1991–1999; 2005–2008
- First appearance: October 17, 1991
- Last appearance: March 3, 2008
- Created by: Reg Watson (based on Diane Archer from The Restless Years)
In-universe information
- Other names: Dian Carina Felicia Alberts; Dian van Houten; Dian van Groeningen; Dian van der Zee
- Occupation: Businesswoman
- Father: Jef Alberts
- Mother: Karin Alberts
- Brothers: John Alberts
- Half-brothers: Remco Alberts; Jonas Alberts
- Half-sisters: Kim Verduyn (adoptive)
- Husband: Frits van Houten (1995); Huib van Groeningen (1999–2005); Donald van der Zee (2006–2008)
- Sons: Jeffrey Alberts
- Grandfathers: Geert Alberts; Ed Mulder
- Grandmothers: Marie Alberts; Leonie Mulder
- Uncles: Robert Alberts
- Aunts: Sandra Mulder
- First cousins: Arnie Alberts (legal); Dennis Alberts; Lotje Alberts; Daantje Mus; Milan Alberts; Sil Selmhorst

Dian Carina Felicia Alberts (formerly van Houten, van Groeningen and van der Zee) is a character from the Dutch television soap series Goede tijden, slechte tijden (English: Good Times, Bad Times). The character is based on Diane Archer from Australian soap-series The Restless Years. Dian was played by three actresses who each represented a different side of her personality: Lotte Van Dam (October 17, 1991 – September 15, 1993, stand-in; May – August 1996) was the good girl, Chris Jolles (December 29, 1994 – January 5, 1999) was the bad girl while Rixt Leddy (September 6, 2005 – March 3, 2008) compromised these characteristics.

== Biography ==
=== 1991–1993 ===
==== Relationships with Tim Waterman and Mark de Moor ====
Dian was the daughter of Jef and Karin Alberts. She had two brothers, John (also deceased) and Remco (Terhorst, Jef's firstborn son from a teenage-relationship). Her cousin was Arnie (who died in 1996), whom her parents looked after while Jef's brother Robert and pregnant wife Laura were living in New York City. Dian arrived in Meerdijk when Jef and Karin were close to splitting up; she wanted to move in with her new boyfriend Tim Waterman, but she had forgotten to inform the latter. Tim went blind after a traffic-accident but was still in for an eye-operation during the Christmas-period. The return of his sight also enabled him to take a fresh look at Dian, and all he could see was a jealous, possessive girl.

Dian looked set to be followed by a newcomer Anita Dendermonde whom she took a strong dislike to. Anita's so-called homeless friend Machteld Steens felt that Dian should be taught a lesson and staged a burglary. Dian was overpowered by one of Machteld's henchmen but ended up accepting Anita's apologies. Soon afterwards she began a relationship with Mark de Moor, an attractive swimmer she met on a spa weekend with her feminist aunt Sandra. During this period Karin was dating building-constructor Jan-Henk Gerritse; the affair lasted long enough to make her realise that her marriage had become a joke. Dian was broken-hearted by Karin's sudden departure, and with Jef failing to comfort her she made a shortlived attempt to run away with Mark. Six months later this relationship ended after Dian spoiled Mark's application for a swim-instructing-job by getting competitive with his potential boss' daughter.

==== Revenge of the freak I ====
Meanwhile Jef took a new CEO-job after resigning from a furniture-factory that used a poisonous glue. His first mission was getting rid of "public enemy no.1" Kees Moree, who gave his superiors ten years' worth of headaches. Moree went to the Alberts' residence for an explanation. Dian answered the door and was picked as an easy target; she could not walk down the street or rest at home without Moree bullying her, and a secret phone-number was no solution either. Dian went to a hotel, but Moree tracked her down and entered her room dressed as a waiter with a rope with which he tied her. Jan-Henk came to the rescue and Jef called the police after finding out that there was something suspicious about his car.

==== Relationship with Arthur Peters ====
Dian met Arthur Peters during a visit to business-woman Suzanne Balk who was driven into a wheelchair by a motorbiker. Initially, Dian begrudged the Surinamese descendant pianist for suggesting that playing servant would not encourage Suzanne in her recovery. By Christmas things had changed, and Dian and Arthur were having a relationship. Jef expressed his concern about the "cultural differences" and others disapproved as well. Arthur was refused entry to the local disco, allegedly for not holding an ID-card. Mickey Lammers, an apprentice journalist, made matters worse by writing a scandalous article. The Xanadu closed its doors which angered two resident bullies. They had their revenge on Dian, Arthur and the latter's landlord Govert Harmsen (initially not keen on the idea of having a black tenant) . All three of them recovered and Arthur successfully proposed to Dian on the dance floor. A meeting with Arthur's parents, Tracy and Frenk Peters, was scheduled, but Jef spoiled it all by turning up drunk because he was now officially divorced. Mark, whose swimming career ended because of his mother's drinking problem, did not help either by telling Tracy why he'd split up with Dian. Arthur was forced into a break-up, but when he decided that he wanted Dian back it was a case of "too much, too little, too late". Dian responded in tears by saying "Why don't you propose to your Mum?". Soon afterwards she learned that Arthur drink drove himself into hospital. She wanted to visit him but Tracy's mother-to-son-lecture put her off the idea. She visited Arthur after all, but both realised that it was over. Dian left Meerdijk to move in with Karin.

=== 1994–1999 ===
==== Dian versus the world ====
During her off-screen period, Dian was introduced to Karin's new boyfriend. However, she did not need a stepfather figure and bullied him away by claiming that he tried to seduce. Once the truth came out she was told to go, but the damage had already been done; Dian was no longer that sweet, fickle-hearted girl she used to be. Dian returned to Meerdijk to do the same to Jef's new wife, Sylvia Merx. Two years later, when Sylvia contracted terminal cancer, Dian showed remorse but by now she was to far removed from her old self.

Dian made the bad-to-worse trip by dating Frits Van Houten, one of Meerdijk's most influential businessmen, and becoming his wife. Jef and Karin disapproved, although the former attended the wedding after all. Van Houten was murdered soon afterwards by being electrocuted in his bath-tub; his jealous secretary Hannie, whom he'd made pregnant during their shortlived affair, was falsely imprisoned as the culprit. Ludo Sanders was called in to take over Van Houten's business matters and saw through Dian's seduction act. He rejected her and married the journalist Janine Elschot.

However, Dian was having his baby but lost it after falling down the stairs. She held Ludo responsible and hooked up with Bowien Galema and new love interest Huib Van Groeningen for revenge. They faked the latter's death and Ludo was framed. At the time John returned from the US, claiming that he underwent plastic surgery following a traffic-accident with memory-loss as a side-effect. In reality he appeared to be a dangerous imposter named Pete Jensens who survived John in the accident. Dian, by now disinherited, chose not to warn Jef and left Meerdijk again.

=== 2005–2008 ===
==== Return to Meerdijk II ====
After breaking up with Van Groeningen, Dian settled in Paris where she almost became bankrupt. Van Houten's US-raised son Jack informed her of a mysterious amulet. Dian was concerned that Jack wanted Frits' possessions and wasted no time in returning to Meerdijk where she had a one-night stand with Dennis Tuinman, her own cousin whom Arnie was swapped for at birth. To top it all, Dian was fooled into believing that Frits had faked his own death. She found out after taking a picture of his backside which did not have the Scrooge McDuck tattoo that Frits had. In fact she was sleeping with his twin brother Hans.

==== Relationships with Donald Van Der Zee and Mohammed Aydin ====
In 2006, Dian married Donald Van Der Zee, a disabled millionaire who only had a few days left to live. After his death, it was widely believed that Dian only married him for financial interests. That did not stop her from using her inheritance to fund Alvida and lure away clients from Sanders Inc. Soon, she set eyes on police inspector Mohammed Aydin who was called in to solve Ludo Sanders' murder (who actually survived). A relationship developed and there was even talk of living together, but Aydin's life was cut short by a traffic accident. Meanwhile, Ludo had seen the light after a Dickensian dream joined forces with Dian in founding the Ludo Sanders Refuge for victims of violence.

==== Revenge of the freak II ====
In 2007, Dian faced the wrath of a stalker who sent her a stuffed butterfly and cut off a fringe of her hair. He also made phone calls after getting Dian's number from Jef's third wife Barbara Fischer. The bartender Rik De Jong was blamed and arrested by the new police inspector, Bob Lanschot, who appeared to be the stalker himself. He was found at his holiday home and arrested at Dian's Meerdijk residence. Lanschot was also responsible for the deaths of his wife and Aydin.

==== Bankruptcy and death ====
The battle with Ludo resumed in 2008 after the latter went bad again. Ludo pursued legal actions because Dian's marriage to Donald Van Der Zee was illegal and had a relative flown in from Australia to testify. Dian lost her money and her business. During the handover to Ludo on February 29, 2008, she was suffering from a brain aneurysm. Ludo refused to call a doctor ("Call a doctor yourself") and left her for paralysed. Laura Selmhorst found her and informed the rest of the family.
