= Albert Market =

Street market in Banjul, Gambia

Coordinates: 13°27′15″N 16°34′19″W

The Albert Market, formerly known officially as Royal Albert Market, is a street market in Banjul, The Gambia. Located on Liberation Avenue, the market was built in the mid-nineteenth century. It is named after Albert, Prince Consort, husband of Queen Victoria of the United Kingdom of Great Britain and Ireland, who controlled the Gambia during colonial times.

== Gallery ==
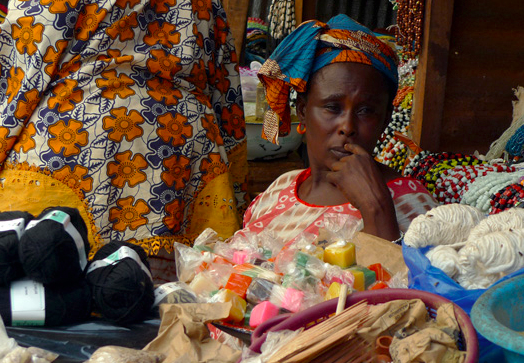

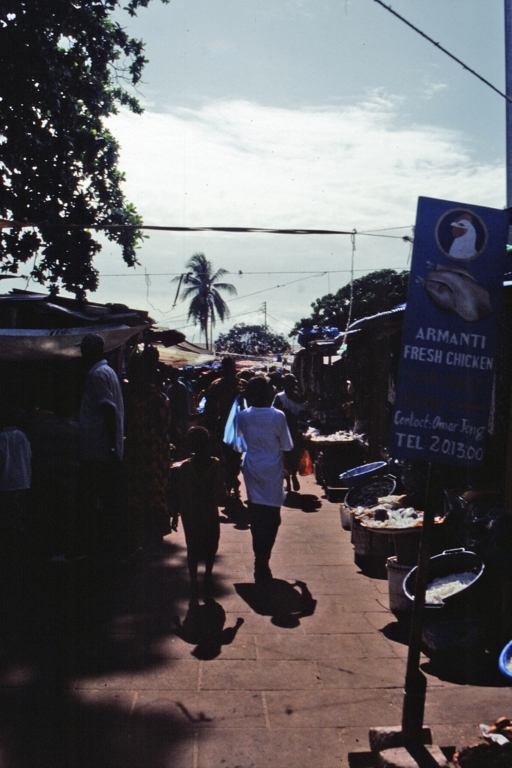

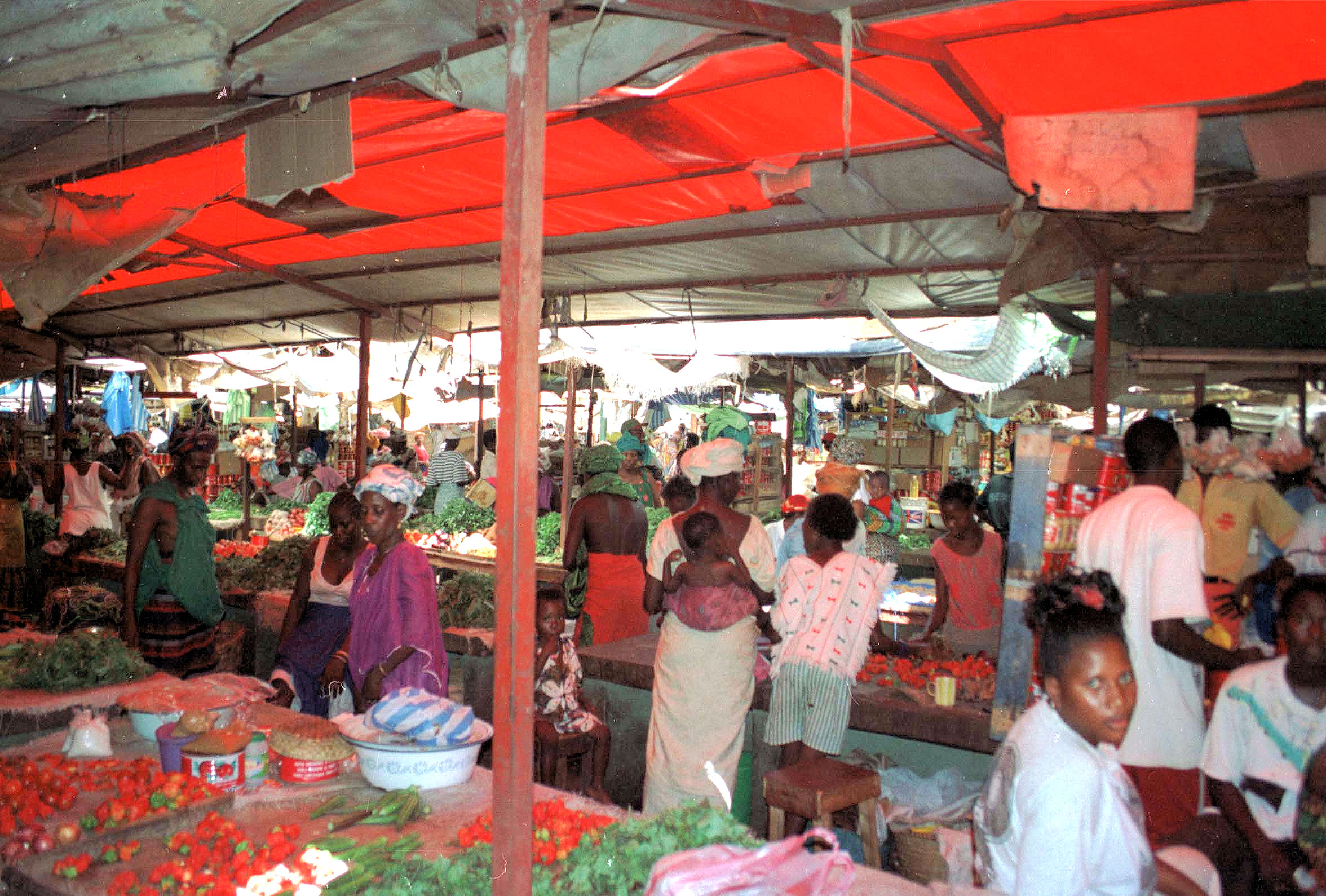

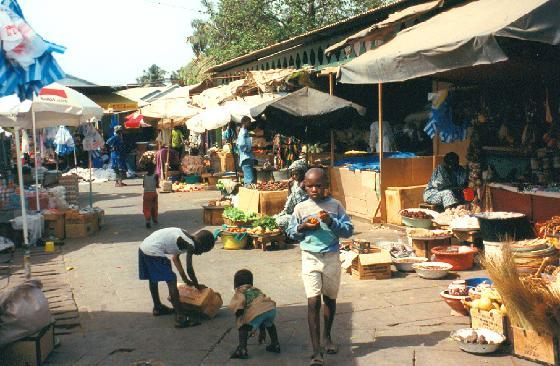

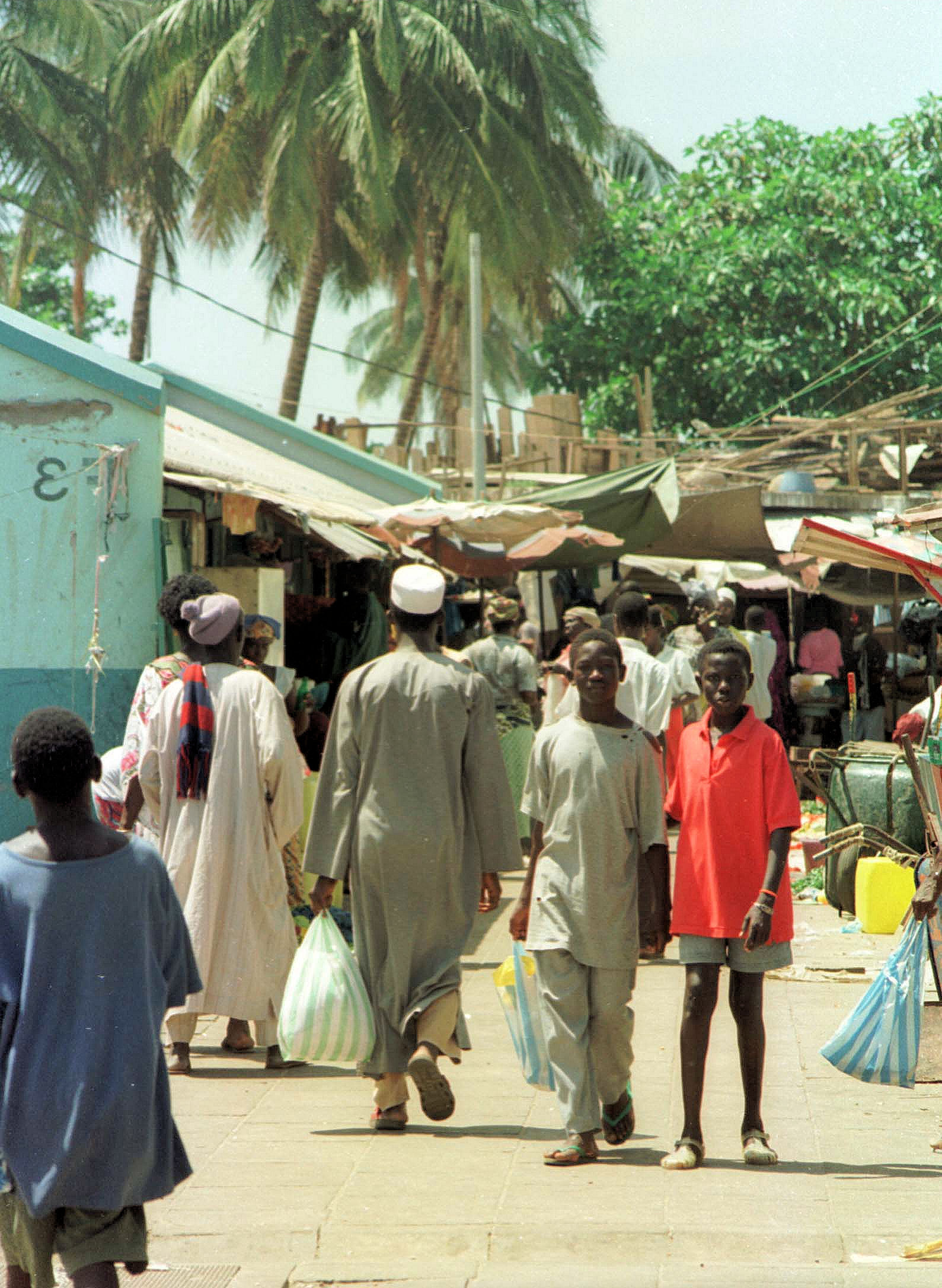

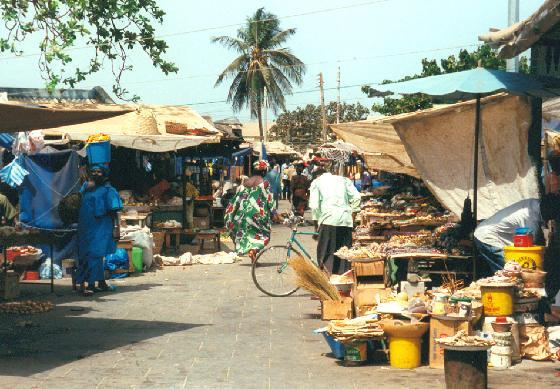

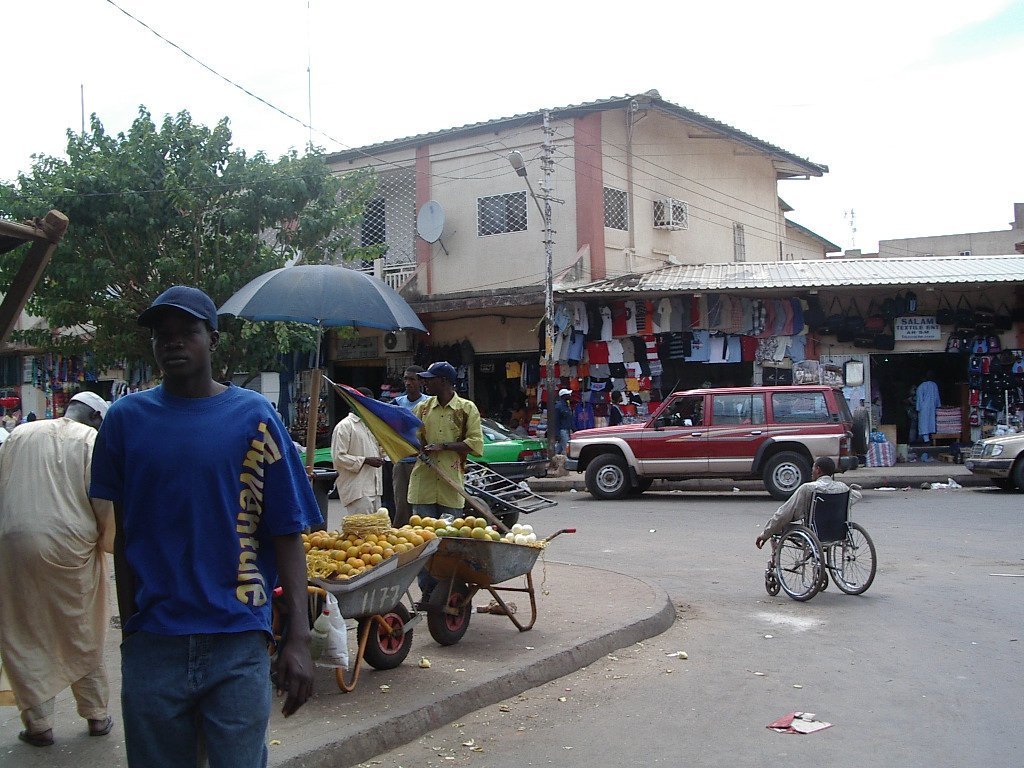

Media related to Albert Market, Banjul at Wikimedia Commons
