= Jenni Alpert =

American singer-songwriter

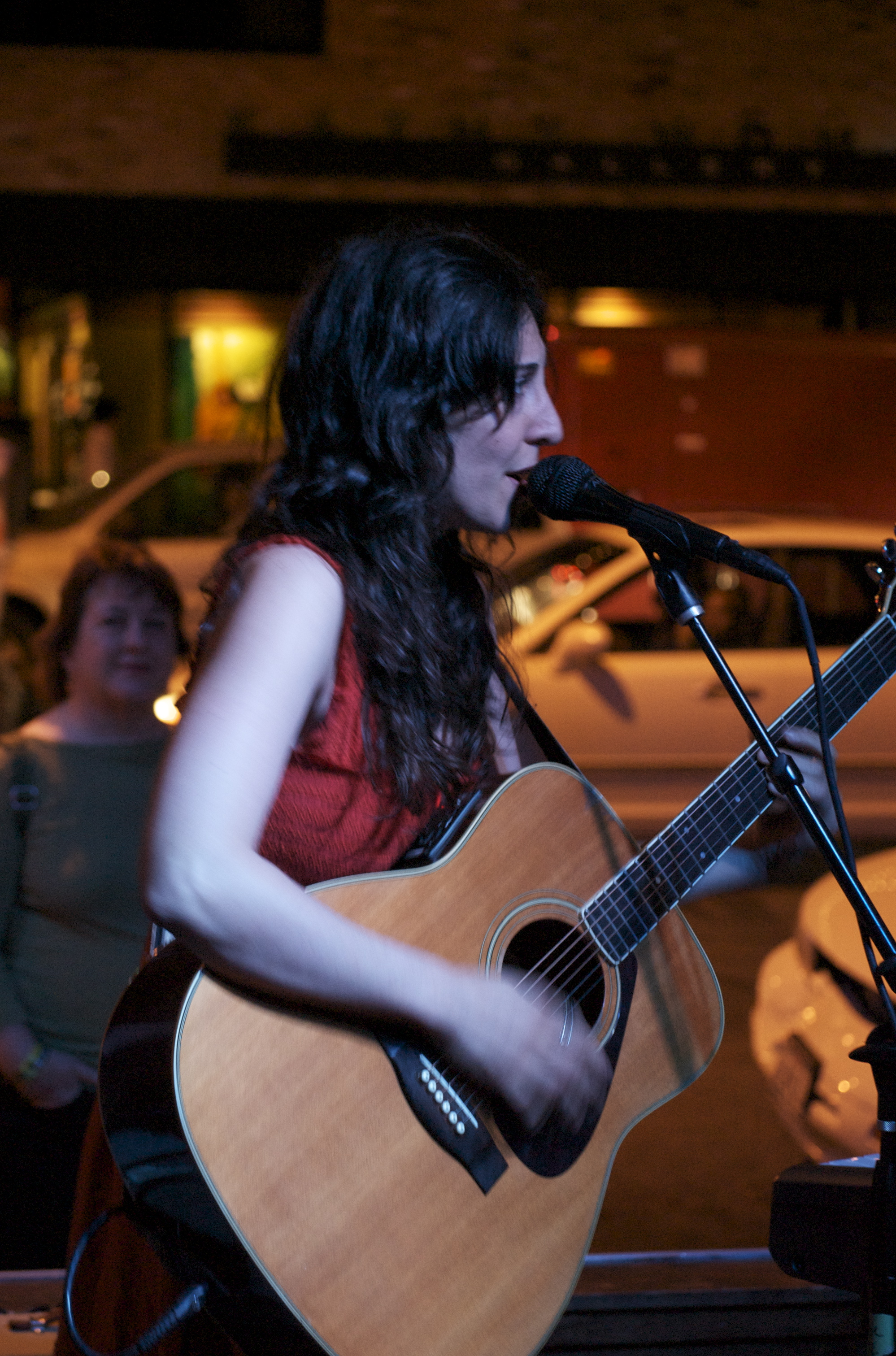
- Jenni Alpert at One2One bar during SXSW 2009

Background information
- Born: Cameron Morantz; Los Angeles, California, U.S.
- Genres: Jazz, pop
- Occupation: Singer • songwriter • guitarist • pianist
- Instruments: Guitar, piano
- Years active: 2005-present
- Label: Indie

Jennifer Ann Alpert (née Cameron Morantz) is an American singer-songwriter, guitarist, and pianist.

== Career ==
Alpert's early independent releases include:

2005: Pieces.

2007: 27 Minutes in Bologna - a live vocal and piano set recorded in Italy.

2008: No Second Guesses, which received radio play in the Netherlands and led to an invitation to do a series of live radio shows.

2010: Underneath the Surface, an album that features musicians including Jimmy Paxson (drummer for Stevie Nicks and Ben Harper), Lenny Castro (percussion for John Mayer), Chris Chaney, Zac Rae, and Stevie Blacke.

2012: Her album Take It All was released.

2013: Shining Light was Alpert's first vinyl record, another live performance recorded in Italy.

2015: Until Then, her most recent work, released by S-Curve Records.

Her music has been featured on US TV shows like ABC's Castle, CBS's CSI Miami, and MTV's The Real World, Teen Mom and 16 and Pregnant.

After releasing her first independent album on iTunes, Alpert was selected to record her song "Untied" by the Sun Studio Sessions for PBS at Sun Studios in Memphis, Tennessee. She later recorded a collection of acoustic performances live in Italy. While touring independently, Alpert collaborated with guitarist Guthrie Trapp in Nashville, Tennessee, to record new songs. These recordings attracted the attention of S-Curve Records, who she later signed a licensing deal with. She then released the album Until Then under the record label.

== Early life and family ==
Alpert was born in Los Angeles and adopted when she was four. While spending time in various foster homes, she began to sing and play the piano.

She received a scholarship to attend UCLA in the Ethnomusicology Department, where she took part in Kenny Burrell's four-year jazz program.

=== Birth father ===
Alpert hired a private investigator to help her find her father. She and her father went on to collaborate on a number of musical and artistic projects. Alpert wrote a memoir about her experience finding her biological father and collaborating with him on music.

==== Homeless: The Soundtrack ====
A short documentary about Alpert's relationship with her father, called Homeless: the Soundtrack, was filmed and edited by director Irene Taylor Brodsky. It received a Jury Award at Tribeca Film Festival, won best short film at Nantucket Film Festival, was screened at the Laemmle Royal Theater in West Los Angeles, and was shortlisted for an IDA award in the short documentary category.

== Other activities ==
Alpert founded the nonprofit Fine Arts Revolution Inc. Fine Arts Revolution Inc. offers wellness programs using the creative arts, services to unhoused communities, and to those in transition. She also started a traveling audiovisual festival called Art of Expression to bring together musicians who support music programs in early childhood education. She supports nonprofits, the Hope of the Valley Rescue Mission and the Celia Center, both which respectively assist homeless people and people who have been either fostered or adopted. Alpert has also performed for America's Blood Centers.

== Discography ==
- Honest Smile (1999)
- Pieces (2005)
- 27 Minutes in Bologna (2007)
- No Second Guesses (2008)
- Underneath the Surface (2010)
- Take it All (2012)
- Shining Light Vinyl (2014)
- Until Then (2015, S-Curve Records)
- Nothing Less (2016)
- Biological Reunion (2018)

== Publications ==
- Home is Where the Heart is, An Adoption and Biological Reunion Story: A Memoir. (2021, self-published; ISBN 9780578938134).
