= Pål Henning Albertsen =

Norwegian footballer (born 1975)

Personal information
- Date of birth: 4 December 1975 (age 50)
- Position: Goalkeeper

Youth career
- Vidar

Senior career*
Years	Team	Apps	(Gls)
1994–1996	Vidar		
1996	→ Strømsgodset (loan)	3	(0)
1997	Strømsgodset	1	(0)
1998	Ullern		
1999	Strømsgodset	1	(0)
2000	Oslo Øst		
2000–2001	Kjelsås	30	(0)
2002–2004	Larvik		
2005	Fram Larvik		
2006	Tønsberg		
2007	Svarstad		
2011–2012	Stabæk	0	(0)
2013	Nanset		
2014	Fram Larvik	1	(0)

International career
1996	Norway U17	3	(0)
1997	Norway U21	2	(0)

Managerial career
- 2007–2012: Stabæk (goalkeeper coach)
- 2013–2015: Fram Larvik (director of sports)
- 2016: Henan Jianye (goalkeeper coach)
- 2017–2018: Strømsgodset (goalkeeper coach)
- 2019–: Larvik HK (managing director)
- * Club domestic league appearances and goals

Pål Henning Albertsen (born 4 December 1975) is a retired Norwegian football goalkeeper and later goalkeeping coach.

He grew up in FK Vidar and became a youth international. In 1996 he was loaned out to Eliteserien club Strømsgodset. This season Strømsgodset encountered a number of goalkeeper problems, heavily stricken by injuries, the team used both Pål Henning Albertsen, Glenn Arne Hansen, Roar Gulliksen, Per Øyvind Dahl, Tom Nilsen and Jon Knudsen. In Albertsen's three matches, Strømsgodset conceded 14 goals. Albertsen nonetheless made a permanent move to Strømsgodset. In 1998 he wanted regular first-team play and went on to Ullern IF, only to return to Strømsgodset post-season. This did not last long either as he moved back to Oslo and FK Oslo Øst in 2000. After a few months he moved on to Kjelsås.

In 2002 Albertsen began a new chapter as player in Larvik clubs, first for Larvik Fotball, then after that became defunct, IF Fram Larvik. In September 2006 he made his debut for FK Tønsberg. Ahead of the 2007 season his contract was not renewed, so he took a job as goalkeeping coach of Stabæk. In Stabæk he coached Jon Knudsen, one of the many Strømsgodset goalkeepers in 1996, who now reached the national team, praising Pål Henning Albertsen's input in the process. At the same time Albertsen played on the fourth tier for Svarstad IL in Lardal Municipality outside of Larvik, but here he was sacked in May 2007 for erratic on-pitch behaviour. He retired, but in 2011 and 2012 he was effectively Stabæk's third-choice goalkeeper, appearing in a pre-season friendly as well as for their B team. Job-wise, in 2013 he moved back to Larvik as director of sports in Fram Larvik. In 2013 he appeared as a player for seventh-tier team Nanset IF, and in 2014 he made one emergency appearance for Fram Larvik. He was behind the signing of former Stabæk player and manager Petter Belsvik as new Fram Larvik manager in 2014. In late 2015 he signed as goalkeeper coach of Henan Jianye in China, He lasted until April 2016, returning to a civic job in Norway. In 2017 and 2018 he was the goalkeeper coach of Strømsgodset. In 2019 he became the new managing director of the handball club Larvik HK, taking over for Petter Belsvik.
