= Siegbert Alber =

German politician (1936–2021)

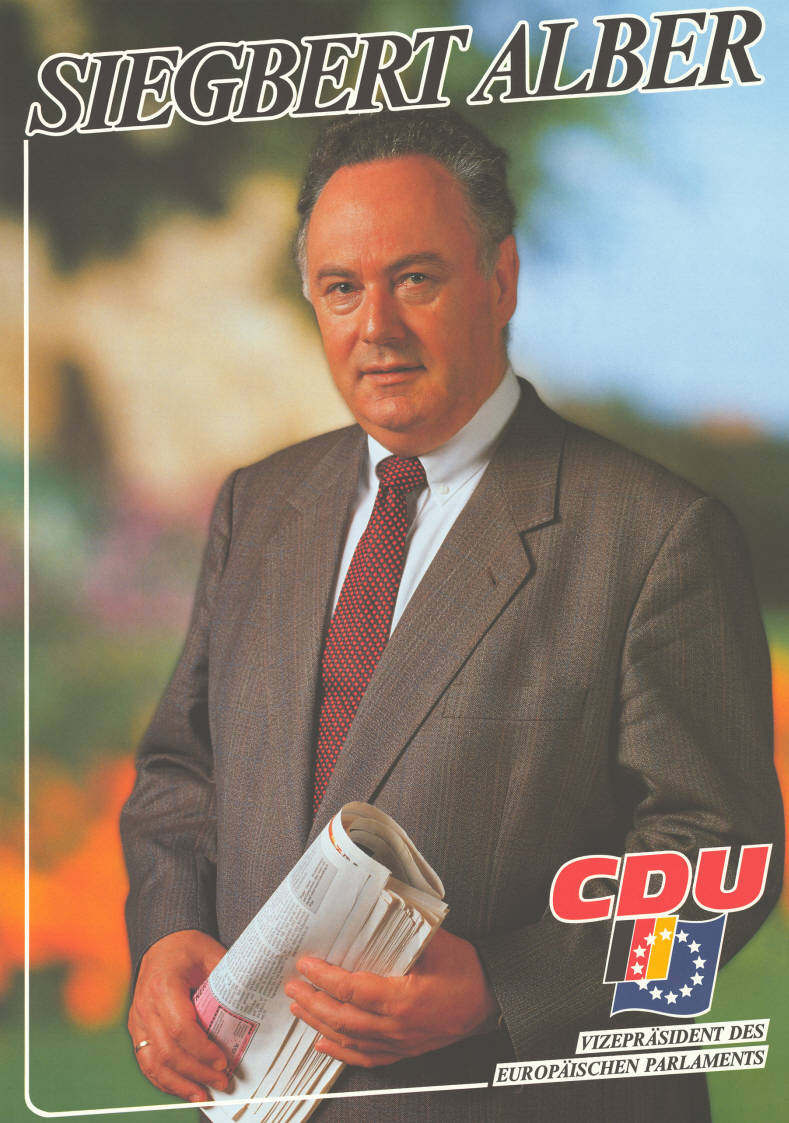
- Siegbert Alber

Member of the Bundestag
- In office 20 October 1969 – 4 November 1980

Personal details
- Born: 27 July 1936 Hechingen
- Party: CDU

Siegbert Alber (27 July 1936 - 4 June 2021) was a German politician of the Christian Democratic Union (CDU) and former member of the German Bundestag.

== Life ==
Alber was a member of the CDU. He was active in the youth organization Junge Union as district, county, and state chairman. From 1971 to 1980 he was chairman of the CDU district association in Stuttgart, which subsequently elected him honorary chairman. From 1969 to 1980, he was a member of the CDU in the German Bundestag for three legislative periods for Baden-Württemberg and a member of the European Parliament from 1977 to 1997. From 1984 to 1992 he was Vice-President of the CDU, having previously been Vice-Chairman of the EPP Group since 1982. He is a founder of the government relations law firm Alber & Geiger in Brussels.

== Literature ==
Herbst, Ludolf; Jahn, Bruno (2002). Vierhaus, Rudolf (ed.). Biographisches Handbuch der Mitglieder des Deutschen Bundestages. 1949–2002 [Biographical Handbook of the Members of the German Bundestag. 1949–2002] (in German). München: De Gruyter - De Gruyter Saur. p. 1715. ISBN 978-3-11-184511-1.
