= Albert Lake (Douglas County, Minnesota) =

Lake in Minnesota, U.S.

- Location within Minnesota Location within the United States
- Location: Douglas County, Minnesota
- Coordinates: 45°56′34″N 95°45′42″W
- Type: Lake
- Surface area: 167.76 acres (67.89 ha)
- Surface elevation: 1,260 feet (380 m)

Albert Lake is a natural lake in Douglas County, in the U.S. state of Minnesota. Albert Lake is a 167.76-acre (67.89 ha) lake.

== History ==
Albert Lake was named for Ole Alberts, a pioneer farmer who settled there. Albert Lake is a natural environment lake which means structures built near the lake require special permits and setbacks, burn piles must be 100 feet (30 m) from the lake and fertilizer may not be used near the lake.

On the southern side of the lake there is a dam across the Chippewa River, 60 ft 0 in (18.29 m) long, 7 ft 0 in (2.13 m) feet high, which was built in 1938. The dam is for recreational purposes.

== See also ==
- List of lakes in Minnesota
