= Sjaak Alberts =

Dutch association football player

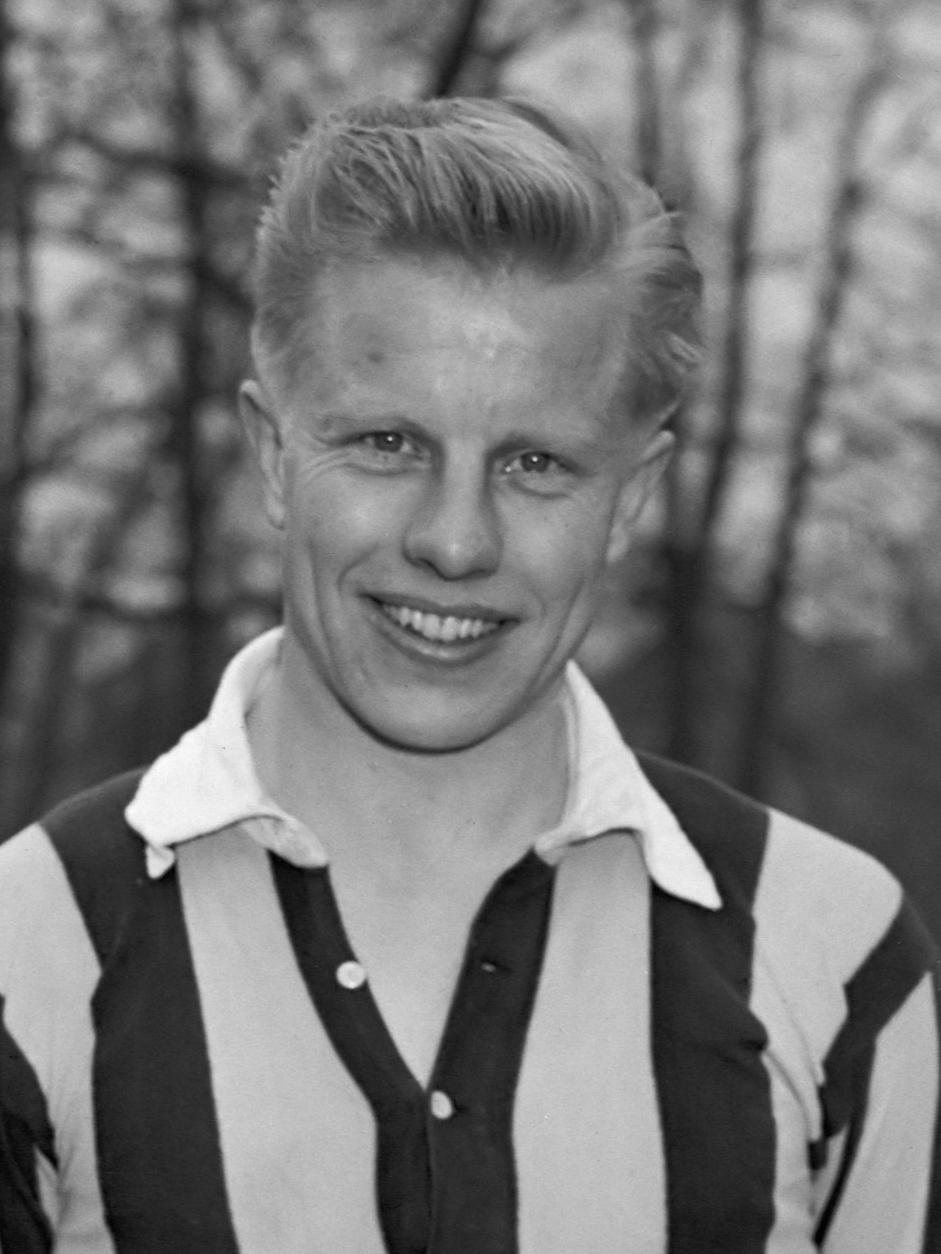
- Sjaak Alberts in 1952

Personal information
- Full name: Jacques Anton Alberts
- Date of birth: 27 February 1926
- Place of birth: Arnhem, Netherlands
- Date of death: 21 July 1997 (aged 71)
- Place of death: The Hague, Netherlands

Youth career
- Gelria

Senior career*
Years	Team	Apps	(Gls)
1942–1953	Vitesse		

International career
1952	Netherlands	5	(0)
- * Club domestic league appearances and goals

Jacques Anton "Sjaak" Alberts (27 February 1926 – 21 July 1997) was a Dutch footballer who played as a defender. A one-club man, he played 11 years for Vitesse before retiring. He also competed in the men's tournament at the 1952 Summer Olympics for the Netherlands.

== Career ==
Born in Arnhem, Alberts started playing football as a youth for Gelria from Velp. Later, he moved to Vitesse where he made his senior debut in the first team of the Arnhem-based club at the age of 16.

In September 1953 during the preparation for the new season, he stopped abruptly. He was 27 years old, until recently an international, and captain of Vitesse, which a few months earlier had become champions in the First Division of the East District. The club finished fourth in the national title race.

Alberts was a defender who ten years after his debut decided to retire in order to focus entirely on a career outside football. He thereby rejected an offer from Wolverhampton Wanderers to become a professional in England.
