= Alverson =

Alverson is a surname. Notable people with the surname include:

- Charles Alverson (1935–2020), American novelist, editor, and screenwriter
- Rick Alverson (born 1971), American film director and screenwriter
- Tommy Alverson (1950–2024), American singer-songwriter

== See also ==
- Alderson (surname)
