= DJ Alber Ensso =

Armenian DJ and producer (born 1999)

DJ Alber Ensso Ալբերտ Կուրշուդյան
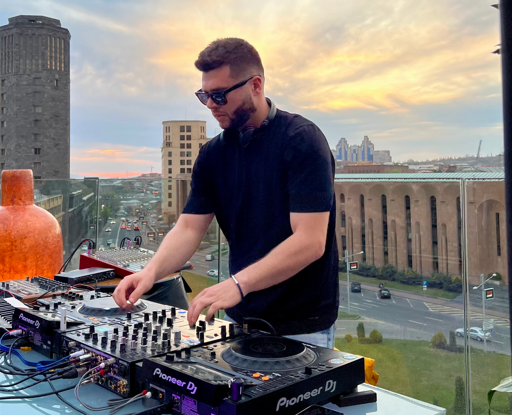
- DJ Alber Enso performing live at an outdoor venue with a cityscape in the background.

Background information
- Also known as: DJ Ocean (All Bert)
- Born: Albert Kurshudyan; May 30, 1999 (age 26); Yerevan, Armenia
- Genres: Electronic
- Occupations: DJ; remixer; record producer
- Years active: 2016–present
- Website: http://www.alberensso.com

Alber Ensso (Armenian: Ալբերտ Կուրշուդյան, original name: Albert Kurshudyan; born May 30, 1999) is an Armenian DJ and music producer.

== Early life ==
He was born in Armenia on May 30, 1999, and grew up in the capital, Yerevan.

== Career ==
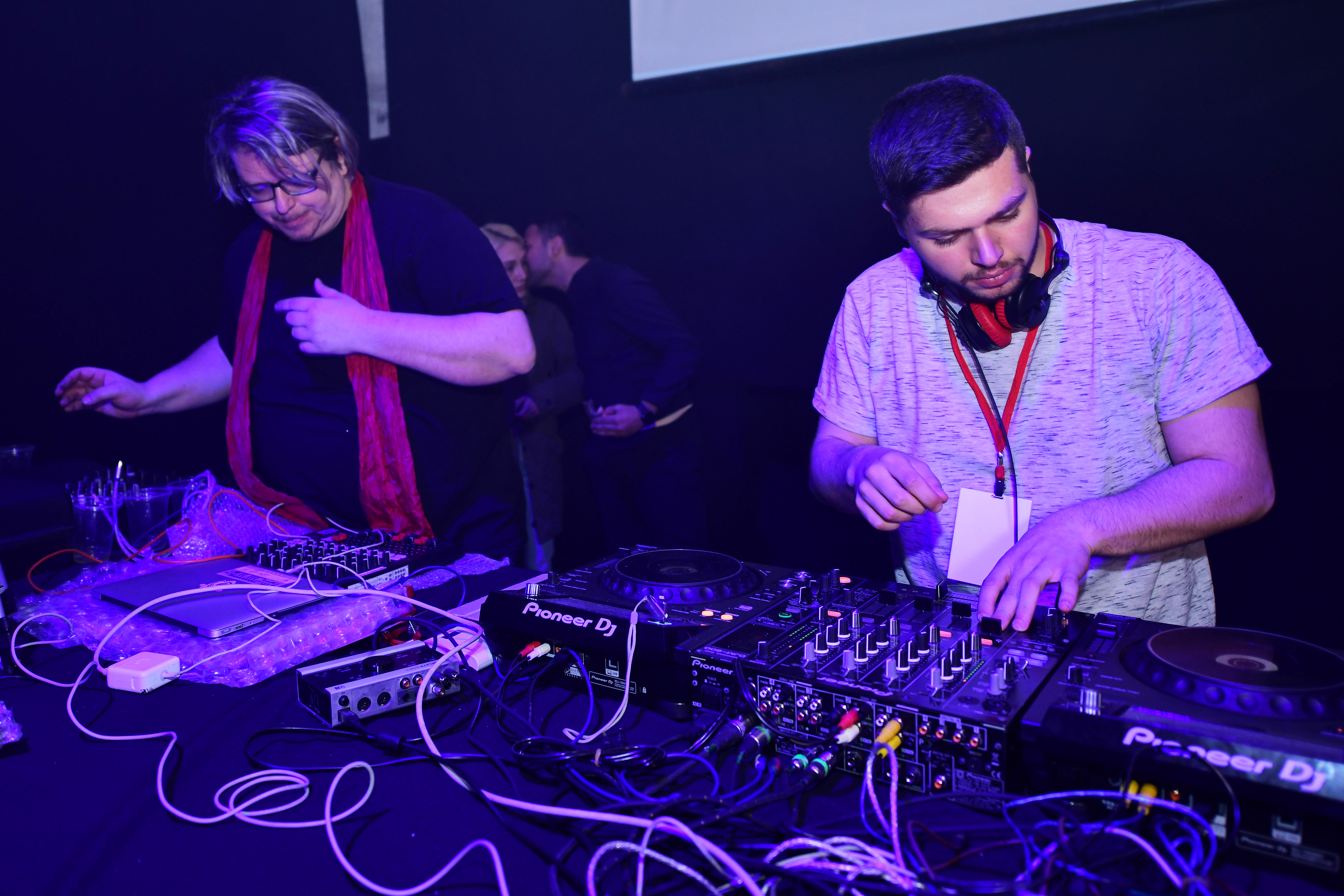
DJ Alber Ensso performing with Robert Babicz on April 22, 2019

He released his first single, "Easter Rhapsody", on April 22, 2019, during a joint live show with Robert Babicz at Armen film movie studio's largest performance space in Yerevan, Armenia. The performance reportedly sold out.

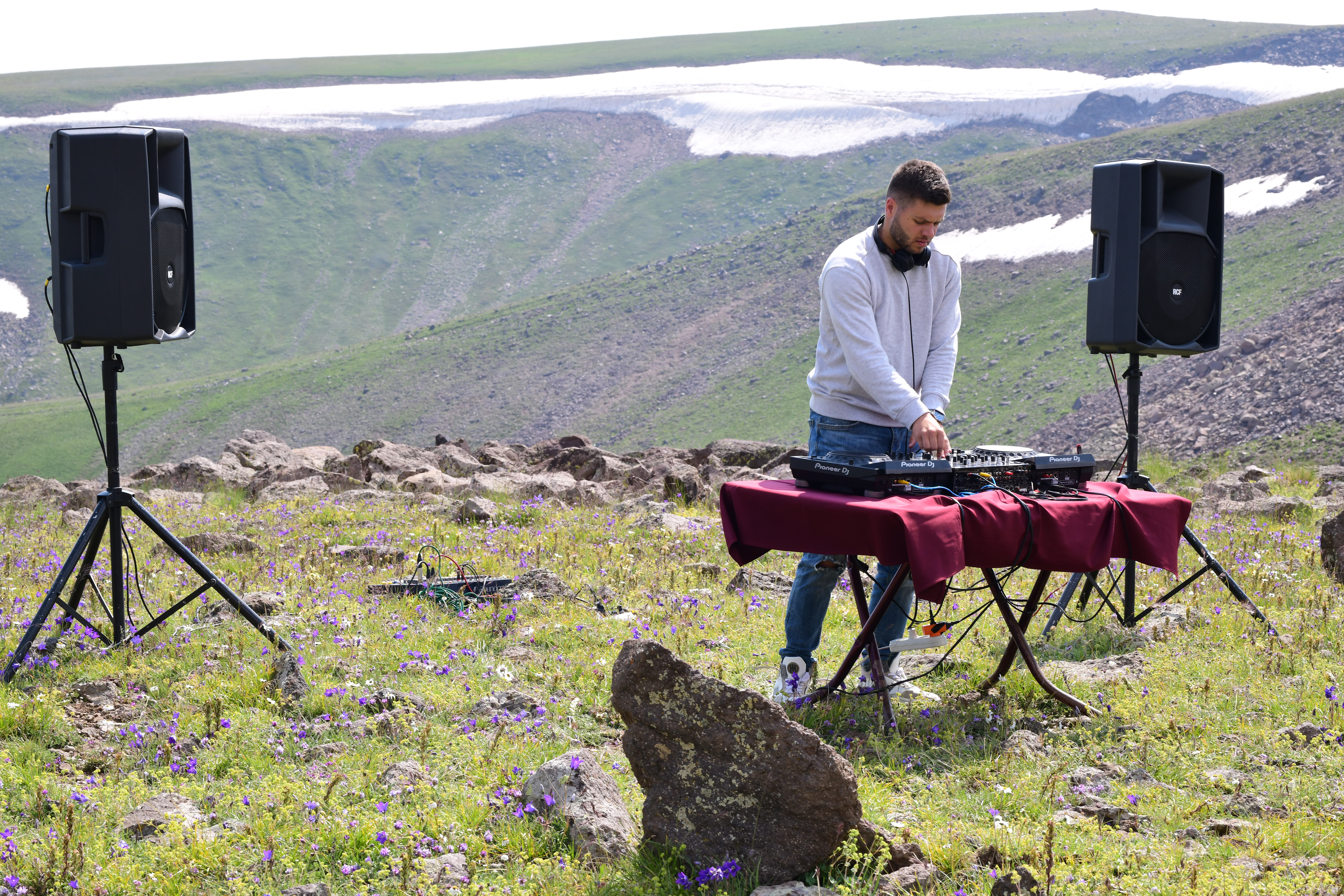
Concert performed by DJ Alber Ensso on Mount Aragats on July 11, 2019

On July 11, 2019, Ensso performed on Mount Aragats, at an altitude of 3,153 meters. The performance was registered in the "Book of Heroes," an Armenian version of The Guinness Book of Records.

In 2021, Ensso moved to Dubai. He is the co-founder of Vaga Music Label. In 2022, he released the Alber Ensso Cyberpunk label, created by his team. In November, he performed during the Formula 1 racing weekend in the UAE. He also performed at the Kaynouna Festival in Dubai, which was attended by more than 3,000 people.

In 2023, he performed at the Odyssey Festival in Dubai. and the Sevan Writers House.
