= Joan Albert =

American photographer

Joan Albert (1943-2012) was an American artist. Her work is included in the collections of the Museum of Modern Art, New York and the Harvard Art Museums. In 2014, two years after her death, Albert was included in a Time Magazine article about under-appreciated photographers from the Northeast United States.

== Biography ==
=== Early life ===
Joan M. Albert was born April 28, 1943, to Charles J. and Elinor (Allen) Mikulka. Albert grew up in Watertown, Massachusetts. After graduating from Mount Trinity Academy in 1960, she went on to attend St. Mary's College in Notre Dame, Indiana where she earned a Bachelors in English in 1964. Albert later went on to earn a Masters Degree from the MFA Massachusetts College of Art in 1983.

=== Death ===
Albert died on Thursday, July 12, 2012, from a heart attack at the age of 69. She was laid to rest at Mount Auburn Cemetery in Cambridge, Massachusetts.
