= Alber & Geiger =

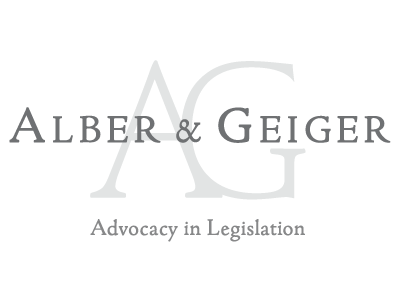
- Type: Government Relations Law firm
- Industry: Lobbying
- Founded: 2007
- Headquarters: Brussels, Belgium. Berlin, Germany
- Key people: Andreas Geiger, Managing Partner
- Website: https://www.albergeiger.com

Alber & Geiger is a political lobbying firm and a European-based government relations law firm, lobbying EU institutions in Brussels. The firm has also a litigation practice at the European Court of Justice and has offices in Brussels and Berlin.

The firm consists of former high ranking EU officials and politicians, diplomats and lawyers from the European Commission, the European Council, the European External Action Service, and the European Court of Justice.

== History ==
The firm was founded in 2007 as a spin-off of leading US lobbying firm Cassidy & Associates by its former European CEO Andreas Geiger, and former CDU politician and former member of the German Bundestag Siegbert Alber, who was also Vice President of the European Parliament and Advocate General at the European Court of Justice. Before that, Geiger was Head of the EU Law Center of Ernst & Young in Brussels and attorney at the law firm Taylor Wessing. He wrote a handbook on EU lobbying.

== Lobbying practice ==
Alber & Geiger is one of few EU lobbying firms that are vocal about their lobbying activities, and advocated for a mandatory transparency register in the past.

Besides lobbying for corporate clients, the firm represents foreign governments. Alber & Geiger received media attention for representing the Bulgarian government on matters relating to EU funds. They represented Morocco in challenging the EU's negative perception of Morocco's position on Western Sahara, India and the UAE on free trade agreements with the EU, and the political opposition of Iran. They represented Panama regarding its inclusion on the EU's money laundering blacklist following the Panama Papers incident.

Their corporate cases include a win against Microsoft before the EU Commission in the EU "browser war", and assistance to Piraeus Bank during the Greek government-debt crisis. They represented the infrastructure company Terna for the construction of the E65 in Greece.

The firm has a history of lobbying for companies from the chemical industry, like US Teflon producer Chemours on the EU PFAS regulation, and Australian agro company Nufarm on EU biofuel policy under the European Green Deal.

Furthermore, they lobbied regarding the EU plastic bag ban, as well as on the state monopolies for gambling laws within the EU. The firm also represented American energy interests in the Balkans against Russian influence.

According to the Transparency Register of the European Union, they also have a China practice which lobbied for Chinese Intco, Xiaomi, Temu and Huawei,

== Controversy ==
In June 2012, the Bureau of Investigative Journalism and The Independent, a leading UK newspaper, revealed how senior members of the House of Lords failed to disclose their business interests in a public inquiry. On Lord Plumb's entry in the register of interests he lists his only remunerated employment/profession as 'farming' despite his involvement with the Brussels-based lobbying firm Alber and Geiger since 2007. According to The Independent, Lord Plumb insists, he did not need to register his involvement because he had never been in employment, paid or unpaid by the firm which is typically the case in law firms with non-executive senior members.
