= Aalbers =

Aalbers, Aalberse and Aalberts are Dutch patronymic surnames meaning "son of Aalbert". People with this name include:

Aalbers

- Albert Aalbers (1897–1961), Dutch architect
- Karel Aalbers (born 1949), Dutch businessman and president of football club Vitesse
- Nicolaas Sebastiaan Aalbers (1772–1806), Dutch naval officer

Aalberse

- Han B. Aalberse, pseudonym of Johannes van Keulen (1917–1983), Dutch writer
- Piet Aalberse Sr. (1871–1948), Dutch Government Minister and Speaker of the House
- Piet Aalberse (1910–1989), Dutch politician, son of the above

Aalberts

- Arie Aalberts (born 1952), Dutch politician in Friesland
- Jan Aalberts (born 1939), Dutch founder of Aalberts Industries
