= Richard Alpert (artist) =

American sculptor

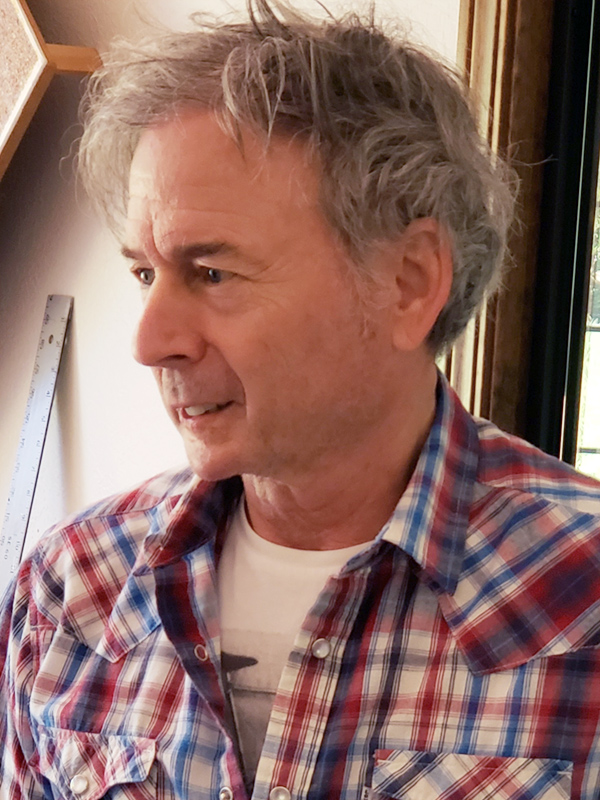
- Photograph of Richard Alpert (artist), circa 2019.
- Born: April 11, 1947 (age 79); New York City, New York
- Education: University of Pittsburgh and San Francisco Art Institute
- Occupation: Artist
- Website: richardalpertartist.com

Richard Alpert (born April 11, 1947) is an American sculptor, abstract filmmaker, and performance artist. He is also known for his work in "Generating Art" and received a National Endowment for the Arts Fellowship Grant in Sculpture in 1979. In 1986 he was nearly killed in a fire that destroyed his studio and much of his artwork.

== Career ==
=== Education ===
Richard Alpert was born on April 11, 1947, in New York City, New York. He graduated with an undergraduate degree in studio arts from the University of Pittsburgh in 1970, and an MFA in sculpture from the San Francisco Art Institute in 1973.

=== Career in the 1970s ===
In the 1970s Alpert's conceptual and performance art included the performance sculpture Strategy for a Dance; the video works Post Time, A Circular Route, The Opacity of Order, and Facture; the article and collection South of the Slot; the printed works Women: On Our Way and Stretch; and the performances Hand Generated Light, Probe, Finger, and Sylph. In 1976 Mir Bahadur wrote in Artweek that Hand Generated Light was created by Alpert locking himself in a closet for three hours cranking a manual electrical generator keeping a tiny light aglow on the outside of the door. The article described this work, as well as Spent Time, Spent Energy and Sylph by the term "Generating Art", whereby the subject of the work itself was the generation of the art being created. Another of his major works from this period of his career is Sound Sculpture.

In 1975 Alpert was interviewed as a part of a Museum of Conceptual Art in San Francisco (MOCA) sponsored history of art project titled 11 Video Interviews produced by Jeanette Willison, and his video work was included with another MOCA video compilation titled A Tight Thirteen Minutes that same year, showing one-minute color video works from thirteen artists. During this period his work appeared in magazines including Artweek and Arts Magazine. Alpert received a National Endowment for the Arts Fellowship Grant in Sculpture in 1979.

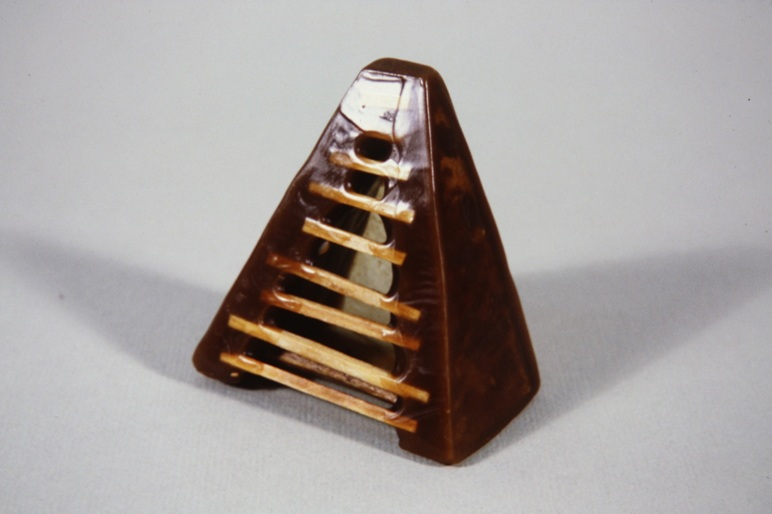

=== Career in the 1980s ===
Alpert's work was described by University of California, Berkeley's Pacific Film Archive in 1980 as "concerned with performance sculpture, video and concept-oriented drawing and object sculpture". That year an exhibition of his work was held at La Mamelle, Time Expands to Fit the Mold. In 1984 Alpert stated that his work was influenced not only by the performative arts but also by science. He wrote specifically that he has been inspired by Boyle's law as well as the second law of thermodynamics.

On April 4, 1986, at 3:30pm EST Alpert's collection of work up until that point was largely lost in an explosion that killed nine people and injured sixteen. During the explosion at the building that housed Alpert's studio, he was working on a new sculpture when the fire began raging on the floors below him. Alpert survived the blaze that took over 150 firefighters to contain. Alpert described the fire to a journalist that day: "There was no warning. There was a gigantic explosion. It went from daylight to pitch black. I got out because the roof collapsed around me."

=== Career in the 2000s ===
I think that all of my work ties into sculptural ideas whether video, performances, and obviously creating objects. All the art that I produce, or have produced, I feel can be interpreted as sculpture, even the work that might be seen as painting.

Since then Alpert has showed his work with a series of videos based on images recorded from a high-speed train journey in Spain, AVE (Alta Velocidad España) variations #1-10. Individual videos from this series have been screened in Europe, Cuba and India.

Alpert has also published three other books based on his photographs and videos over past ten years. He also restored a 1967 16mm film made whilst a student at the University of Pittsburgh, Pennsylvania.

Alpert continues to produce object sculpture, photography and graphic (drawings) artwork.

He featured in Light on the Walls of Life: A Tribute Anthology to Lawrence Ferlinghetti, ISBN 9781734146011 published by Jambu Press, San Francisco, March 24, 2022. The image of his sculpture "Open the Bomb Bay Doors, Hal", appears on page 43.

== Political Career ==
In May, 2026, he announced his candidacy for Governor of California as a write in. He did not fill the paperwork and votes for him will not be counted.

== Published works ==
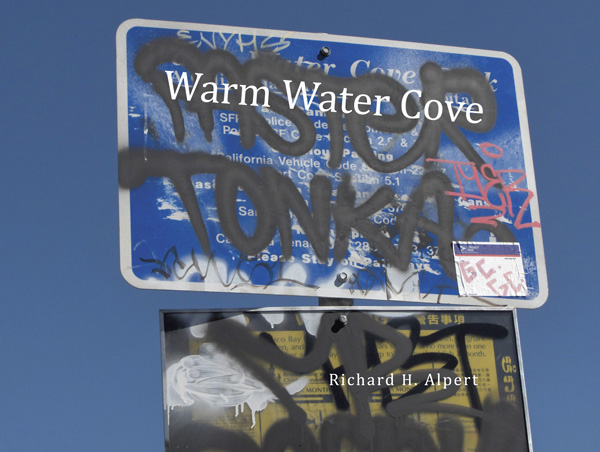

Warm Water Cove is a photo-book by Richard Alpert he published in 2015. His website describes this collection as "… a celebration of another San Francisco; one far off the beaten path and excluded from travel brochures and TripAdvisor. This side of San Francisco was certainly not host to the 'summer of love' nor 'little cable cars…'".
