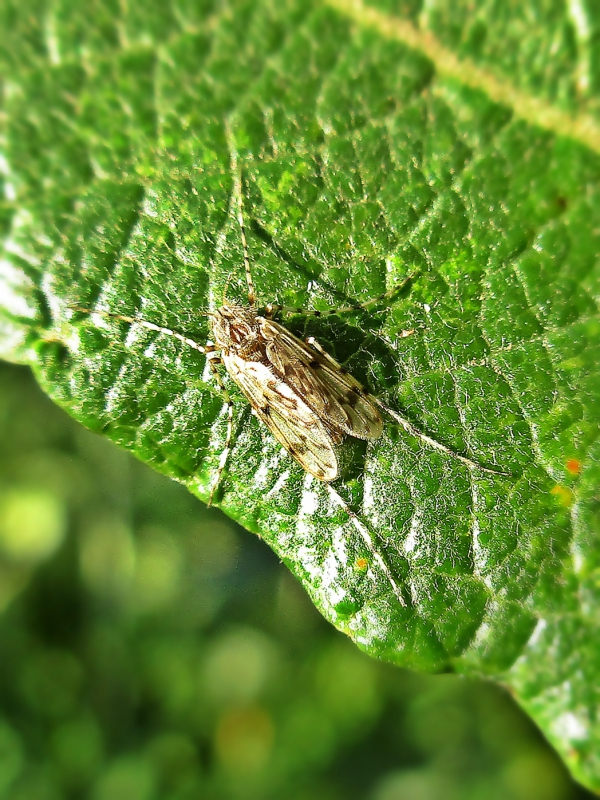
- Ablabesmyia sp.

Scientific classification
- Kingdom: Animalia
- Phylum: Arthropoda
- Clade: Pancrustacea
- Class: Insecta
- Order: Diptera
- Family: Chironomidae
- Subfamily: Tanypodinae
- Tribe: Pentaneurini
- Genus: Ablabesmyia; Johannsen, 1905

= Ablabesmyia =

Genus of flies

Ablabesmyia is a genus of non-biting midges in the subfamily Tanypodinae of the bloodworm family Chironomidae.

== Ecology ==
Ablabesmyia longistyla, A. monilis and A. phatta are widespread and common in Europe. Larvae of A. longistyla and A. monilis have been found together and seem to be restricted to the shallow oxygenated littoral zone.

== Species ==
These 85 species belong to the genus Ablabesmyia:

- Ablabesmyia aequidensi Sahin, 1987^{c g}
- Ablabesmyia alaskensis Roback, 1971^{i c g}
- Ablabesmyia alba Chaudhuri, Debnath & Nandi, 1983^{c g}
- Ablabesmyia amamisimplex Sasa, 1991^{c g}
- Ablabesmyia annandalei (Kieffer, 1910)^{c g}
- Ablabesmyia annulata (Say, 1823)^{i c g b}
- Ablabesmyia annulatipes (Kieffer, 1912)^{c g}
- Ablabesmyia appendiculata (Kieffer, 1923)^{c g}
- Ablabesmyia aspera (Roback, 1959)^{i c g}
- Ablabesmyia atromaculata Edwards, 1928^{c g}
- Ablabesmyia aurea^{i c}
- Ablabesmyia basalis Walley^{g}
- Ablabesmyia bianulata Paggi, 1988^{c g}
- Ablabesmyia caliptera (Kieffer, 1906)^{c}
- Ablabesmyia callicoma (Kieffer, 1911)^{c g}
- Ablabesmyia cinctipes (Johannsen, 1946)^{i c g b}
- Ablabesmyia costarricensis (Picado, 1913)^{c g}
- Ablabesmyia digitata (Kieffer, 1923)^{c g}
- Ablabesmyia dusoleili Goetghebuer, 1935^{c g}
- Ablabesmyia ebbae Lehmann, 1981^{c g}
- Ablabesmyia eggeri (Goetghebuer & Lenz, 1936)^{c g}
- Ablabesmyia ensiceps Chaudhuri, Debnath & Nandi, 1983^{c g}
- Ablabesmyia formulosus (Skuse, 1889)^{c g}
- Ablabesmyia freemani Harrison, 1978^{c g}
- Ablabesmyia hauberi Beck and Beck, 1966^{i c g}
- Ablabesmyia hilli Freeman, 1961^{c g}
- Ablabesmyia idei (Walley, 1925)^{i c g}
- Ablabesmyia illinoensis Malloch, 1915^{i c g}
- Ablabesmyia indicus (Kieffer, 1910)^{c}
- Ablabesmyia infumata (Edwards, 1931)^{c g}
- Ablabesmyia janta (Roback, 1959)^{i c g}
- Ablabesmyia jogancornua Sasa & Okazawa^{g}
- Ablabesmyia johannseni (Roback, 1959)^{i c g}
- Ablabesmyia kisanganiensis Lehmann, 1981^{c g}
- Ablabesmyia lata^{g}
- Ablabesmyia limbata (Lundstrom, 1915)^{c g}
- Ablabesmyia longistyla Fittkau, 1962^{c g}
- Ablabesmyia macrocercus (Kieffer, 1910)^{c g}
- Ablabesmyia maculitibialis Chaudhuri, Debnath & Nandi, 1983^{c g}
- Ablabesmyia makarchenkoi^{g}
- Ablabesmyia mala (Hutton, 1902)^{c g}
- Ablabesmyia mallochi (Walley, 1925)^{i c g}
- Ablabesmyia melaleuca Goetghebuer, 1935^{c g}
- Ablabesmyia metica Roback, 1983^{c g}
- Ablabesmyia miki (Goetghebuer & Lenz, 1936)^{c}
- Ablabesmyia moniliformis Fittkau, 1962^{c g}
- Ablabesmyia monilis (Linnaeus, 1758)^{i c g}
- Ablabesmyia nilotica (Kieffer, 1923)^{c}
- Ablabesmyia notabilis (Skuse, 1889)^{c g}
- Ablabesmyia oriplanus (Kieffer, 1911)^{c g}
- Ablabesmyia ornatipes (Kieffer, 1910)^{c g}
- Ablabesmyia paivai (Kieffer, 1910)^{c}
- Ablabesmyia parajanta Roback, 1971^{i c g}
- Ablabesmyia pectinata (Botnariuc, 1953)^{c g}
- Ablabesmyia peleensis (Walley, 1926)^{i c g b}
- Ablabesmyia perexilis^{g}
- Ablabesmyia phatta (Egger, 1863)^{c g}
- Ablabesmyia philosphagnos Beck and Beck, 1966^{i c g}
- Ablabesmyia photophilus (Kieffer, 1911)^{c}
- Ablabesmyia pictipes (Kieffer, 1923)^{c g}
- Ablabesmyia platensis^{g}
- Ablabesmyia prorasha Kobayashi & Kubota, 2002^{c g}
- Ablabesmyia pruinosa Harrison, 1978^{c g}
- Ablabesmyia pruninosa Harrison, 1978^{c g}
- Ablabesmyia pseudornata (Santos Abreu, 1918)^{c g}
- Ablabesmyia pulchripennis (Lundbeck, 1898)^{i c g}
- Ablabesmyia pulchripes (Kieffer, 1910)^{c g}
- Ablabesmyia punctulata (Philippi, 1865)^{c g}
- Ablabesmyia quadrinotata (Lundstrom, 1915)^{c g}
- Ablabesmyia rasha Roback, 1971^{i c g}
- Ablabesmyia reissi Paggi & Suarez, 2000^{c g}
- Ablabesmyia rhamphe Sublette, 1964^{i c g}
- Ablabesmyia rimae Harrison, 1991^{c g}
- Ablabesmyia rubicundulus (Santos Abreu, 1918)^{c g}
- Ablabesmyia rufa (Kieffer, 1923)^{c g}
- Ablabesmyia setosicornis (Kieffer, 1910)^{c g}
- Ablabesmyia simpsoni Roback, 1985^{i c g}
- Ablabesmyia subrecta (Kieffer, 1923)^{c}
- Ablabesmyia sulphurea (Goetghebuer, 1942)^{c g}
- Ablabesmyia suturalis (Santos Abreu, 1918)^{c g}
- Ablabesmyia transversus Chaudhuri, Debnath & Nandi, 1983^{c g}
- Ablabesmyia truncata (Goetghebuer, 1938)^{c g}
- Ablabesmyia tucuxi Neubern & Fusari^{g}
- Ablabesmyia variipes (Kieffer, 1910)^{c g}
- Ablabesmyia virduliventris (Santos Abreu, 1918)^{c g}

Data sources: i = ITIS, c = Catalogue of Life, g = GBIF, b = Bugguide.net
