= Ablabesmyia pulchripes =

Scientific classification
- Kingdom: Animalia
- Phylum: Arthropoda
- Clade: Pancrustacea
- Class: Insecta
- Order: Diptera
- Family: Chironomidae
- Genus: Ablabesmyia
- Species: A. pulchripes

Binomial name
- Ablabesmyia pulchripes (Kieffer, 1910)

Species of insect

Ablabesmyia pulchripes is a species of dipteran insect of the genus Ablabesmyia, family Chironomidae.

It's was found for first time in 1910 by Kieffer

== Distribucion ==
It is distributed throughout by India.
