= Ablabesmyia subrecta =

Scientific classification
- Kingdom: Animalia
- Phylum: Arthropoda
- Clade: Pancrustacea
- Class: Insecta
- Order: Diptera
- Family: Chironomidae
- Genus: Ablabesmyia
- Species: A. subrecta

Binomial name
- Ablabesmyia subrecta (Kieffer, 1923)

Species of fly

Ablabesmyia subrecta is a species of dipteran insect of the genus Ablabesmyia, family Chironomidae.

It was first identified by Jean-Jacques Kieffer in 1923.
