= Ablabesmyia phatta =

Scientific classification
- Kingdom: Animalia
- Phylum: Arthropoda
- Class: Insecta
- Order: Diptera
- Family: Chironomidae
- Genus: Ablabesmyia
- Species: A. phatta

Binomial name
- Ablabesmyia phatta (Egger, 1863)

Species of fly

Ablabesmyia phatta is a species of Chironomidae flies described by Egger in 1863. No sub-species specified in Catalogue of Life.
