= Ablabesmyia pectinata =

Scientific classification
- Kingdom: Animalia
- Phylum: Arthropoda
- Class: Insecta
- Order: Diptera
- Family: Chironomidae
- Genus: Ablabesmyia
- Species: A. pectinata

Binomial name
- Ablabesmyia pectinata (Botnariuc, 1953)

Species of fly

Ablabesmyia pectinata is a species of fly described by Botnariuc 1953. No sub-species mentioned in Catalogue of Life.
