= Ablabesmyia paivai =

Scientific classification
- Kingdom: Animalia
- Phylum: Arthropoda
- Class: Insecta
- Order: Diptera
- Family: Chironomidae
- Genus: Ablabesmyia
- Species: A. paivai

Binomial name
- Ablabesmyia paivai (Kieffer, 1910)

Species of fly

Ablabesmyia paivai is a species of fly described by Jean-Jacques Kieffer in 1910 . No sub-species specified in Catalogue of Life.
