= Ablabesmyia bianulata =

Scientific classification
- Kingdom: Animalia
- Phylum: Arthropoda
- Clade: Pancrustacea
- Class: Insecta
- Order: Diptera
- Family: Chironomidae
- Genus: Ablabesmyia
- Species: A. bianulata

Binomial name
- Ablabesmyia bianulata Paggi, 1988

Species of insect

Ablabesmyia bianulata is a species of midge in the family Chironomidae.

== Distribution ==
It is found in Argentina.
