= Ablabesmyia infumata =

Scientific classification
- Kingdom: Animalia
- Phylum: Arthropoda
- Class: Insecta
- Order: Diptera
- Family: Chironomidae
- Genus: Ablabesmyia
- Species: A. infumata

Binomial name
- Ablabesmyia infumata (Edwards, 1931)

Species of fly

Ablabesmyia infumata is a species of fly described by Edwards in 1931. No sub-species specified in Catalogue of Life.
