= Ablabesmyia virduliventris =

Scientific classification
- Kingdom: Animalia
- Phylum: Arthropoda
- Class: Insecta
- Order: Diptera
- Family: Chironomidae
- Genus: Ablabesmyia
- Species: A. virduliventris

Binomial name
- Ablabesmyia virduliventris (Santos Abreu, 1918)

Species of fly

Ablabesmyia virduliventris is a species of dipteran insect of the genus Ablabesmyia, family Chironomidae. It was found for first time in 1918 by Abreu.

== Distribution ==
It is distributed throughout the Canary Islands.
