= Ablabesmyia longistyla =

Scientific classification
- Kingdom: Animalia
- Phylum: Arthropoda
- Clade: Pancrustacea
- Class: Insecta
- Order: Diptera
- Family: Chironomidae
- Genus: Ablabesmyia
- Species: A. longistyla

Binomial name
- Ablabesmyia longistyla Fittkau, 1962

Species of insect

Ablabesmyia longistyla is a species of midge in the family Chironomidae.

== Distribution ==
Ablabesmyia longistyla is found in Europe and Asia.
