= Ablabesmyia rhamphe =

Scientific classification
- Kingdom: Animalia
- Phylum: Arthropoda
- Clade: Pancrustacea
- Class: Insecta
- Order: Diptera
- Family: Chironomidae
- Genus: Ablabesmyia
- Species: A. rhamphe

Binomial name
- Ablabesmyia rhamphe Sublette, 1964

Species of insect

Ablabesmyia rhamphe is a species of dipteran insect of the genus Ablabesmyia, family Chironomidae.

It was described in 1964 by James E. Sublette.

== Distribution ==
It is found from Minnesota to Ohio, Texas and Alabama.
