= Ablabesmyia philosphagnos =

Scientific classification
- Kingdom: Animalia
- Phylum: Arthropoda
- Class: Insecta
- Order: Diptera
- Family: Chironomidae
- Genus: Ablabesmyia
- Species: A. philosphagnos

Binomial name
- Ablabesmyia philosphagnos Beck and Beck, 1966

Species of fly

Ablabesmyia philosphagnos is a species of fly described by Günther Beck von Mannagetta und Lerchenau in 1966. No sub-species specified in Catalogue of Life.
