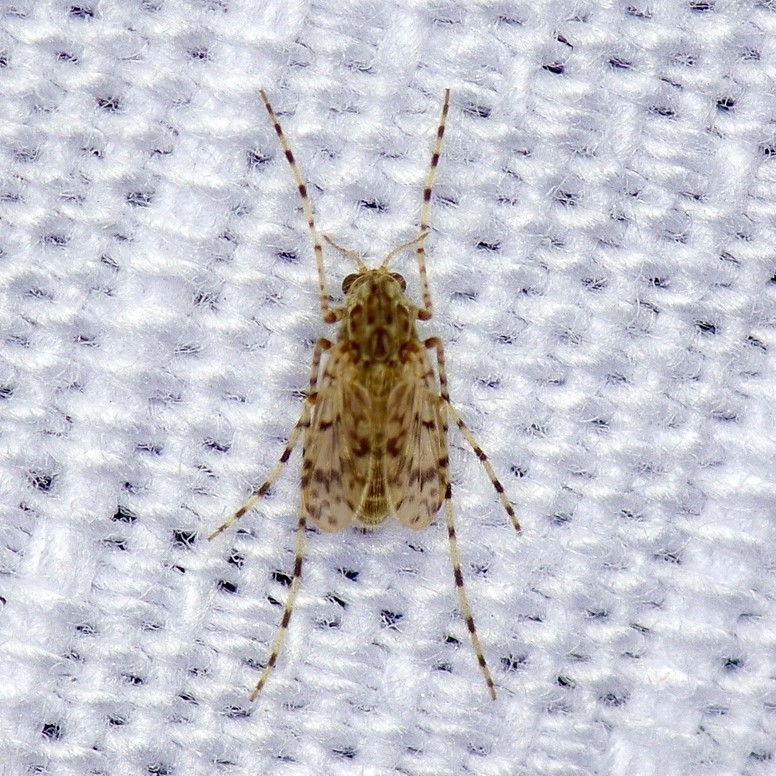

Scientific classification
- Kingdom: Animalia
- Phylum: Arthropoda
- Class: Insecta
- Order: Diptera
- Family: Chironomidae
- Tribe: Pentaneurini
- Genus: Ablabesmyia
- Species: A. cinctipes

Binomial name
- Ablabesmyia cinctipes (Johannsen, 1946)

Synonyms
- Pentaneura cinctipes Johannsen, 1946

= Ablabesmyia cinctipes =

Species of fly

Ablabesmyia cinctipes is a species of midge in the family Chironomidae.
