= Ablabesmyia transversus =

Scientific classification
- Kingdom: Animalia
- Phylum: Arthropoda
- Clade: Pancrustacea
- Class: Insecta
- Order: Diptera
- Family: Chironomidae
- Genus: Ablabesmyia
- Species: A. transversus

Binomial name
- Ablabesmyia transversus Chaudhuri, Debnath & Nandi, 1983

Species of fly

Ablabesmyia transversus is a species of midge in the family Chironomidae. It was described in 1983 by Chaudhuri, Debnath & Nandi.

== Distribution ==
A. transversus is known from Odisha, India.
