= Albert Johannsen =

Albert Johannsen (1871–1962), was a geologist and geology professor at the University of Chicago who wrote several books on rocks. He also authored The House of Beadle and Adams and Its Dime and Nickel Novels (1950). He collected dime novels. His academic focus was petrology. He also wrote a book about Charles Dickens book illustrator Phiz.

Lee Wilson Dodd wrote to him enclosing an in progress text and explanation of his writing process in 1923.

Northern Illinois University has a collection of his and Edward T. LeBlanc's dime novels.

His brother Oskar Johannsen was a professor of entomology at Cornell University.

== Bibliography ==
- A Descriptive Petrography of the Igneous Rocks (1931)
- The House of Beadle and Adams and Its Dime and Nickel Novels: The Story of a Vanished Literature (1950)
- Manual of Petrographic Methods (1914)
- A Key for the Determination of Rock-Forming Minerals in Thin Sections (1908)
- Essentials for the Microscopical Determination of Rock-forming Minerals and Rocks: In Thin Sections (1922)
- The Fundamental Principles of Petrology (1916)
- The serpentines of Harford County, Maryland
- PHIZ: Illustrations from the Novels of Charles Dickens, University of Chicago Press (1956)
