= Ablabesmyia oriplanus =

Scientific classification
- Kingdom: Animalia
- Phylum: Arthropoda
- Clade: Pancrustacea
- Class: Insecta
- Order: Diptera
- Family: Chironomidae
- Genus: Ablabesmyia
- Species: A. oriplanus

Binomial name
- Ablabesmyia oriplanus (Kieffer, 1911)

Species of insect

Ablabesmyia oriplanus is a species of dipteran insect of the genus Ablabesmyia, family Chironomidae. It was found for first time in 1911 by Kieffer

== Distribution ==
It is distributed throughout by India.
