= Ablabesmyia rasha =

Scientific classification
- Kingdom: Animalia
- Phylum: Arthropoda
- Clade: Pancrustacea
- Class: Insecta
- Order: Diptera
- Family: Chironomidae
- Genus: Ablabesmyia
- Species: A. rasha

Binomial name
- Ablabesmyia rasha Roback, 1971

Species of insect

Ablabesmyia rasha is a species of midge in the family Chironomidae.

It was first described in 1971 by Roback.

== Distribution ==
It is found throughout New Hampshire
