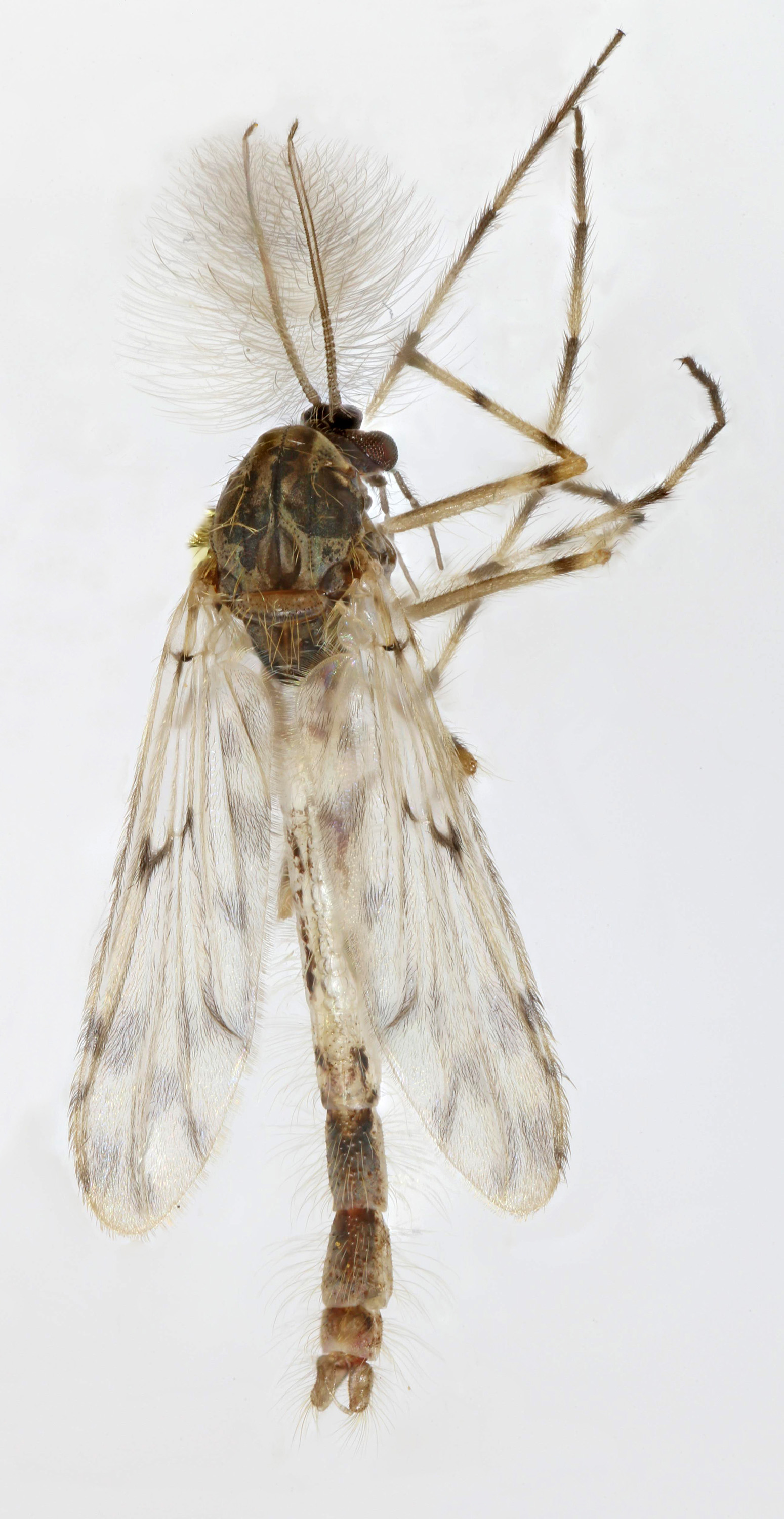

Scientific classification
- Kingdom: Animalia
- Phylum: Arthropoda
- Class: Insecta
- Order: Diptera
- Family: Chironomidae
- Genus: Ablabesmyia
- Species: A. monilis

Binomial name
- Ablabesmyia monilis Linnaeus,1758

= Ablabesmyia monilis =

Species of fly

Ablabesmyia monilis, the Collared Banded-leg Midge, is a Palearctic species of Chironomidae described by Carl Linnaeus, in 1758. No sub-species mentioned in Catalogue of Life. It is found over all of Europe
