= Ablabesmyia truncata =

Scientific classification
- Kingdom: Animalia
- Phylum: Arthropoda
- Class: Insecta
- Order: Diptera
- Family: Chironomidae
- Genus: Ablabesmyia
- Species: A. truncata

Binomial name
- Ablabesmyia truncata (Goetghebuer, 1938)

Species of fly

Ablabesmyia truncata is a species of dipteran insect of the genus Ablabesmyia, family Chironomidae.

It was discovered and described in 1938 by Goetghebuer.

== Distribution ==
A. truncata can be found in Russia.
