= Ablabesmyia notabilis =

Scientific classification
- Kingdom: Animalia
- Phylum: Arthropoda
- Clade: Pancrustacea
- Class: Insecta
- Order: Diptera
- Family: Chironomidae
- Genus: Ablabesmyia
- Species: A. notabilis

Binomial name
- Ablabesmyia notabilis (Skuse, 1889)

Species of insect

Ablabesmyia notabilis is a species of dipteran insect of the genus Ablabesmyia, family Chironomidae.

It was described in 1889 by Skuse.

== Distribution ==
It is found from Australia.
