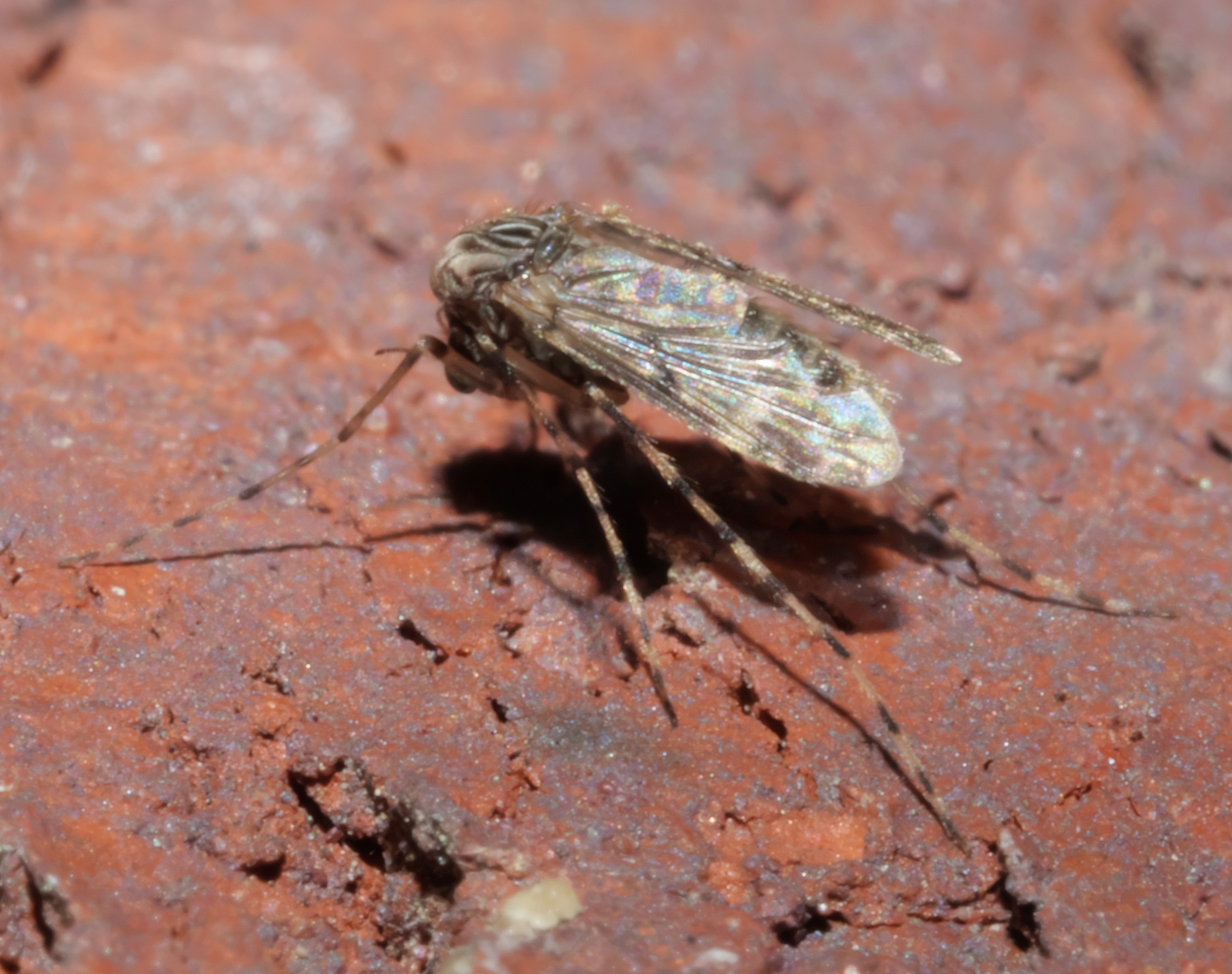
- Ablabesmyia annulata, Oklahoma

Scientific classification
- Kingdom: Animalia
- Phylum: Arthropoda
- Clade: Pancrustacea
- Class: Insecta
- Order: Diptera
- Family: Chironomidae
- Genus: Ablabesmyia
- Species: A. annulata

Binomial name
- Ablabesmyia annulata (Say, 1823)

Synonyms
- Tanypus annulata Say, 1823

= Ablabesmyia annulata =

Species of fly

Ablabesmyia annulata is a species of midge in the family Chironomidae. It is found primarily in North America.
