= Ablabesmyia rubicundulus =

Scientific classification
- Kingdom: Animalia
- Phylum: Arthropoda
- Clade: Pancrustacea
- Class: Insecta
- Order: Diptera
- Family: Chironomidae
- Genus: Ablabesmyia
- Species: A. rubicundulus

Binomial name
- Ablabesmyia rubicundulus (Santos Abreu, 1918)

Species of insect

Ablabesmyia rubicundulus is a species of dipteran insect of the genus Ablabesmyia, family Chironomidae.

It was described in 1918 by Abreu.

== Distribution ==
It is distributed throughout the Canary Islands.
