= Ablabesmyia simpsoni =

Scientific classification
- Kingdom: Animalia
- Phylum: Arthropoda
- Clade: Pancrustacea
- Class: Insecta
- Order: Diptera
- Family: Chironomidae
- Genus: Ablabesmyia
- Species: A. simpsoni

Binomial name
- Ablabesmyia simpsoni Roback, 1985

Species of insect

Ablabesmyia simpsoni is a species of dipteran insect of the genus Ablabesmyia, family Chironomidae.

It was described in 1985 by Roback.

== Distribution ==
It is distributed by New York.
