= Ablabesmyia moniliformis =

Scientific classification
- Kingdom: Animalia
- Phylum: Arthropoda
- Class: Insecta
- Order: Diptera
- Family: Chironomidae
- Genus: Ablabesmyia
- Species: A. moniliformis

Binomial name
- Ablabesmyia moniliformis Fittkau, 1962

Species of fly

Ablabesmyia moniliformis is a species of fly discovered by Ernst Josef Fittkau in 1962. No sub-species specified in Catalogue of Life.
