= Ablabesmyia suturalis =

Scientific classification
- Kingdom: Animalia
- Phylum: Arthropoda
- Clade: Pancrustacea
- Class: Insecta
- Order: Diptera
- Family: Chironomidae
- Genus: Ablabesmyia
- Species: A. suturalis

Binomial name
- Ablabesmyia suturalis Santos Abreu, 1918

Species of fly

Ablabesmyia suturalis is a species of dipteran insect of the genus Ablabesmyia, family Chironomidae.

== Distribution ==
It is distributed throughout the Canary Islands.
