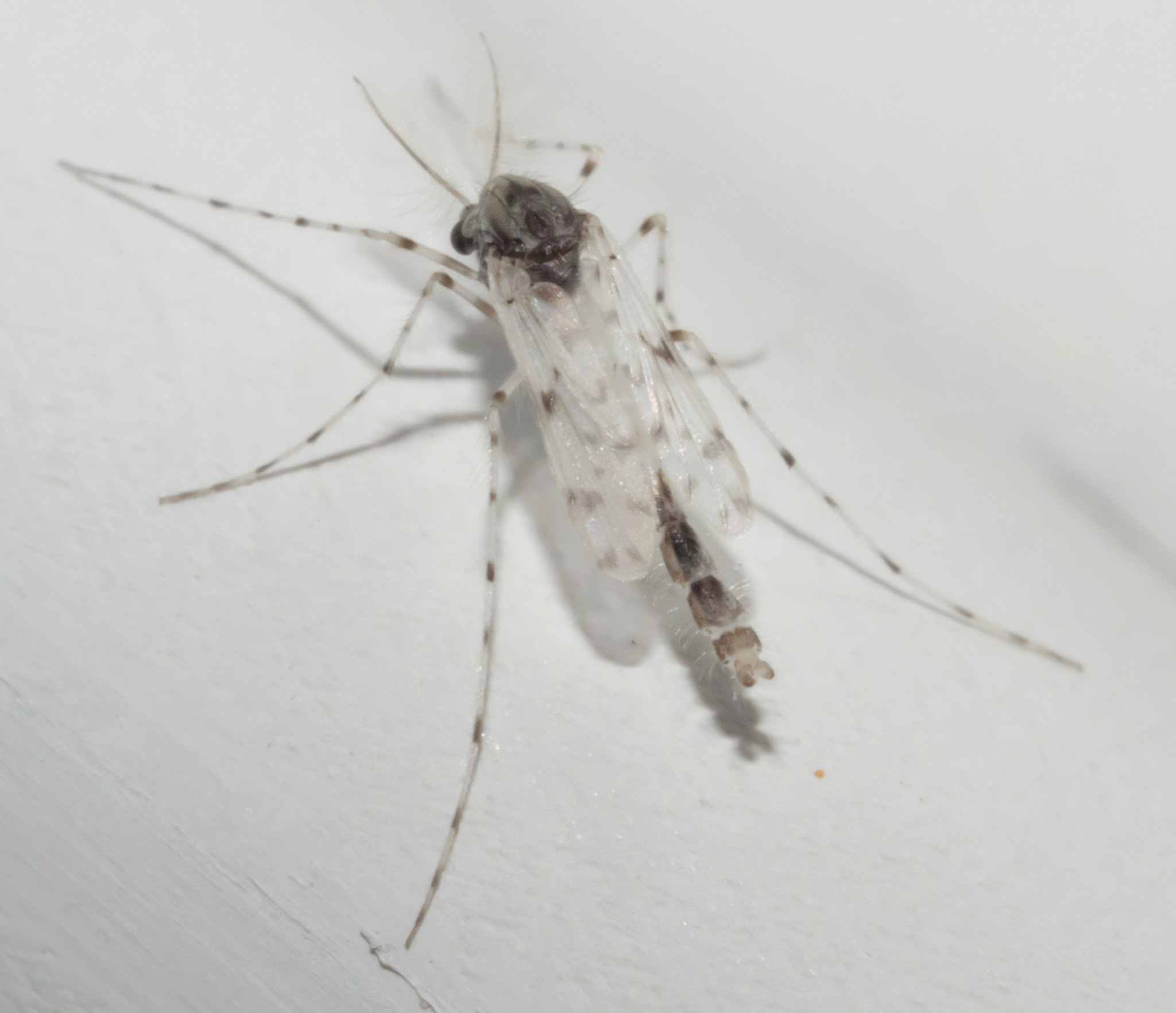
- Ablabesmyia peleensis, Oklahoma

Scientific classification
- Kingdom: Animalia
- Phylum: Arthropoda
- Class: Insecta
- Order: Diptera
- Family: Chironomidae
- Tribe: Pentaneurini
- Genus: Ablabesmyia
- Species: A. peleensis

Binomial name
- Ablabesmyia peleensis (Walley, 1926)

Synonyms
- Tanypus peleensis Walley, 1926

= Ablabesmyia peleensis =

Species of fly

Ablabesmyia peleensis is a species of midge in the family Chironomidae, found in North America.
