= Ablabesmyia aspera =

Scientific classification
- Kingdom: Animalia
- Phylum: Arthropoda
- Clade: Pancrustacea
- Class: Insecta
- Order: Diptera
- Family: Chironomidae
- Genus: Ablabesmyia
- Species: A. aspera

Binomial name
- Ablabesmyia aspera (Roback, 1959)

Synonyms
- Pentaneura gera Roback, 1959

Species of fly

Ablabesmyia aspera is a species of fly. It was found for first time in 1959 by Roback.

This species belongs to the genus Ablabesmyia, familia Chironomidae.
