= Ablabesmyia miki =

Scientific classification
- Kingdom: Animalia
- Phylum: Arthropoda
- Class: Insecta
- Order: Diptera
- Family: Chironomidae
- Genus: Ablabesmyia
- Species: A. miki

Binomial name
- Ablabesmyia miki (Goetghebuer & Lenz, 1936)

Species of fly

Ablabesmyia miki is a species of fly described by Maurice Emile Marie Goetghebuer in 1936. No sub-species specified in Catalogue of Life.
