= Ablabesmyia variipes =

Scientific classification
- Kingdom: Animalia
- Phylum: Arthropoda
- Class: Insecta
- Order: Diptera
- Family: Chironomidae
- Genus: Ablabesmyia
- Species: A. variipes

Binomial name
- Ablabesmyia variipes (Kieffer, 1910)

Species of fly

Ablabesmyia variipes is a species of dipteran insect of the genus Ablabesmyia, family Chironomidae.

It was found for first time in 1910 by Kieffer.

== Distribution ==
It is distributed by Myanmar.
