= Oskar Augustus Johannsen =

American entomologist

Oskar Augustus Johannsen (14 May 1870, Davenport, Iowa – 7 November 1961, Ithaca, New York), was an American entomologist who specialised in Diptera. Johannsen earned degrees from the University of Illinois and Cornell University. He taught civil engineering at Cornell from 1899 to 1909, entomology at the University of Maine from 1909 to 1912, and entomology at Cornell from 1912 to 1938.

His brother Albert Johannsen was a professor of petrology at the University of Chicago and a collector of dime novels who wrote a book on one of the dime novel publishing houses and another on Charles Dickens illustrator Phiz.
