= Albert Darasz =

- Wojciech Władysław Darasz
- Born: 19 August 1808; Warsaw, Poland
- Died: November 25, 1852 (aged 44); London
- Resting place: Highgate Cemetery

Albert Darasz (Polish: Wojciech Władysław Darasz, 25 November 1808, Warsaw, 19 August 1852, London) was a leading figure in the Polish National Liberation Movement. He took part in the 1830-1831 insurrection in Poland. Darasz also belonged to the democratic group of Polish emigrants and was a member of the Central Committee of European Democracy.

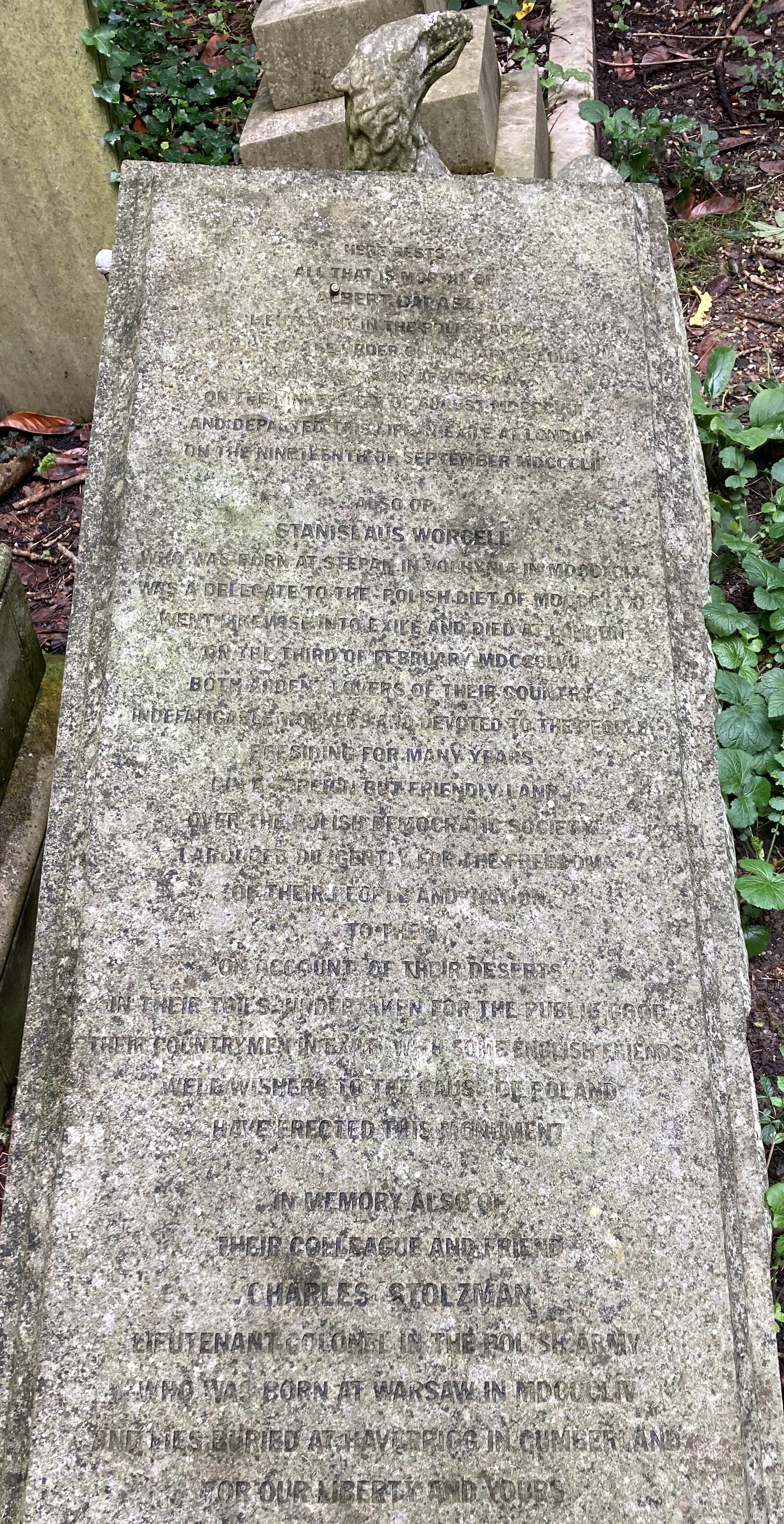
Grave of Albert Darasz in Highgate Cemetery

He is buried on the western side of Highgate Cemetery.
