= Albert Hwang =

Albert Hwang is an artist of Wiremap and also the artist of studio art.

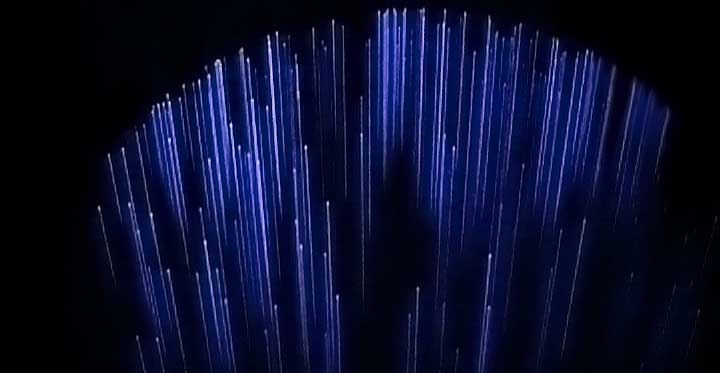
This image comes from phedhex.com

== WIREMAP ==
Wiremap creates representation of an object on 3D space. 85 or 256 wires between two parallel and horizontal boards were hanging and those wires were evenly spaced and vertically arrayed. Using 3D projector, those wires reflect manipulating light from a 3D projector and create more detail 3D vision. The object on wires' screen will move around, change in color or size by keyboard and mouse input.

== YouTube ==
- Wiremap256
- New Program on the Wiremap
