= Albert Yee =

American educational psychologist

Albert H. Yee
- Education: University of California, Berkeley; San Francisco State University; Stanford University
- Scientific career
- Fields: Educational psychology
- Workplaces: University of Wisconsin–Madison; California State University–Long Beach

Albert H. Yee is an American educational psychologist. He taught at universities in the United States and East Asia for forty-three years before retiring in 1995. A 1965 graduate of Stanford University, he is the founding president of the Western Montana Stanford Alumni Club. He was also the president of the Chinese-American Faculty Association of Southern California from 1975 to 1977 and of the Asian American Psychological Association from 1979 to 1982. He was educated at the University of California, Berkeley, San Francisco State University, and Stanford University. He has taught at the University of Wisconsin–Madison, Florida International University, California State University–Long Beach, and the University of Montana, where he served as dean of the School of Education before resigning in 1981. In 1980, while at the University of Montana, he became the first American psychologist to be invited to China by the Institute of Psychology of the Chinese Academy of Sciences.
