= Albert Bedford =

Australian cricketer

Personal information
- Full name: Albert Austen Bedford
- Born: 12 September 1932; Adelaide, South Australia
- Died: 25 March 2001 (aged 68); Adelaide, South Australia
- Batting: Left-handed
- Bowling: Slow left-arm orthodox
- Role: Bowler

Domestic team information
- Years: Team
- 1956/57–1958/59: South Australia

Career statistics
Competition	First-class
Matches	15
Runs scored	277
Batting average	16.29
100s/50s	0/0
Top score	32*
Balls bowled	3506
Wickets	33
Bowling average	41.60
5 wickets in innings	0
10 wickets in match	0
Best bowling	4/80
Catches/stumpings	10/–
- Source: Cricinfo, 24 April 2018

Albert Bedford (12 September 1932 – 25 March 2001) was an Australian cricketer. He played fifteen first-class matches for South Australia between 1956 and 1959.
