= Albert J. Weatherhead Jr. =

American football player and coach (1892–1966)

Biographical details
- Born: March 26, 1892; Cleveland, Ohio, U.S.
- Died: December 13, 1966 (aged 74); Shaker Heights, Ohio, U.S.

Playing career
- 1914–1915: Harvard
- Position: End

Coaching career (HC unless noted)
- 1916–1917: Bowdoin

Albert John Weatherhead Jr. (March 26, 1892 – December 14, 1966) was an American college football player and coach. He served as the head football coach at Bowdoin College from 1916 to 1917.
