= Görtz =

Görtz, Goertz or Görts is a surname. Notable people with the surname include:

- Albrecht von Goertz (1914–2006), German automobile designer
- Allie Goertz, American musician known for her satirical songs
- Armin Görtz (born 1959), German former footballer
- Dave Goertz (born 1965), Canadian ice hockey defenceman
- Georg Heinrich von Görtz, Baron of Schlitz (1668–1719), diplomat in Swedish service
- Hermann Görtz (1890–1947), German spy in Britain and Ireland before and during World War II
- Maria Johanna Görtz (1783–1853), Swedish artist and a member of the Royal Swedish Academy of Arts
- Raymond Goertz, American roboticist
- Roman Görtz (born 1974), retired German footballer
- Ulrich Görtz (born 1973), German mathematician
- Werner Görts (born 1942), retired German football player

== See also ==
- Geertz
- Gertz
- Goertz
- Geerts
- Geert
- Gert
- Gort (disambiguation)
- Gerz
- Goerz
- Gorz
- Geers
- Gers (disambiguation)
- Goers
- Gors
- Geer (disambiguation)
- Ger
- Goer
- Gor (disambiguation)
