= Gerz =

Gerz is a surname. Notable people with the surname include:

- Esther Shalev-Gerz (born 1948 as Gilinsky), Lithuanian artist
- Ferdinand Gerz (born 1988), German sport sailor
- Jochen Gerz (born 1940), German artist
- Wolfgang Gerz (1952–2023), German sport sailor

== See also ==
- Geers
- Geert
- Geerts
- Geertz
- Gertze
- Gertz
- Gert (disambiguation)
- Gers (disambiguation)
- Goertz
- Goerz
- Goers
- Gortz
- Gort (disambiguation)
- Gors
- Gorz (disambiguation)
- Gor (disambiguation)
