= Geurts =

Geurts is a Dutch patronymic surname. The given name Geurt may be a variant of Geert from Gerard, or a short form of Govert or Godert (Godard). Notable people with the surname include:

- Carla Geurts (born 1971), Dutch swimmer
- Darryl Geurts (born 1994), German football player
- Jaco Geurts (born 1970), Dutch politician
- James Geurts (born c.1966), American Assistant Secretary of the Navy
- Jean-Richard Geurts (born 1957), Belgian comics artist known as "Janry"
- Joop Geurts (1923–2009), Dutch baseball player
- Joseph Geurts (1939–2012), Belgian racing cyclist
- Loes Geurts (born 1986), Dutch football player
- Mascha Geurts (born 1973), Dutch water polo player
- Rob Geurts (born 1959), Dutch bobsledder
- Tom Geurts (born 1964), Dutch economist
- Toon Geurts (1932–2017), Dutch sprint canoer
- Willy Geurts (born 1954), Belgian football player
- Yvonne Geurts (1907–1952), Belgian figure skater
