= Goertz =

Goertz is a surname.

Notable people with the surname include:

- Albrecht von Goertz (1914–2006), German industrial designer
- Allie Goertz (born 1991), American comedy musician, writer and editor
- Dave Goertz (born 1965), Canadian retired professional ice hockey player
- Georg Heinrich von Goertz (1668–1719), Swedish diplomat
- Lise Arsenault-Goertz (born 1954; née Arsenault), Canadian gymnast
- Raymond Goertz (1915–1970), American mechanical engineer and an early pioneer in the field of robotics
- Wolfram Goertz (born 1961), German musician

== See also ==
- Gordon v Goertz — [1996] 2 S.C.R. 27, concerning parental relocation; with Robin James Goertz and Janet Rita Gordon/Janette Rita Goertz
- Reed v. Goertz — 598 U.S. 230 (2023), concerning the statute of limitations; with Bryan Goertz being the state prosecutor named as defendant in the case
- Gertz
- Gert
- Gerz
- Gers (disambiguation)
- Gors
- Gorz (disambiguation)
- Gort (disambiguation)
- Gortz
