= Gors =

Gors or GORS may refer to:

== Places ==
- Gors Castle, Gors, Gors-Opleeuw, Borgloon, Limburg, Belgium; a mansion
- Gors, Gors-Opleeuw, Borgloon, Limburg, Belgium
- Gors, Rēzekne, Latgale, Latvia
- Gors, Anglesey, Wales, UK

== People ==
- Max Gors (1945–2014), U.S. jurist
- Wilhelm Robert Theodor Görs, founder of piano-maker R. Görs & Kallmann

== Other uses ==
- Government Operational Research Service of the United Kingdom
- General Organization of Remote Sensing of Syria

== See also ==
- Sol Gorss (born Saul Gorss; 1908–1966), U.S. actor and stuntman
- Gorses, Lot, France
- Gor (disambiguation), for the singular of Gors
- Gorz
- Gortz
- Goers
- Goerz
- Goertz
