= Gert =

- Pronunciation: English: /ˈɡɜːrt/ GURT; German: [ˈɡɛʁt] Swedish: [ˈjæʈː] Dutch: [ˈɣɛrt] Afrikaans: [ˈχɛrt]
- Gender: Masculine

Origin
- Origin: Dutch, German, North Germanic, Belgium
- Meaning: Gerard

Other names
- Related names: Geert, Gerard, Gerd, Gerhard

Gert is a mainly masculine given name (sometimes a short form of Gerrit, Gerard, etc.), with some female bearers (short for Gertrude).

Since 1993 no one in Sweden has been baptised as Gert according to the Swedish Bureau of Census, so the name is becoming increasingly rare. In 2010 around 12,000 in Sweden had the name as their first name according to the same source. Gert is most common in Sweden among men over 50 years of age. Around 400 women in Sweden have Gert as their first name according to the Swedish Bureau of Census.

== Sports ==
- Gert Aandewiel (born 1969), Dutch football player and manager
- Gert Andersen (born 1939), Danish handball player
- Gert Bals (1936–2016), Dutch footballer
- Gert Bender (born 1948), German motorcycle racer
- Gerrit Gert van den Berg (cyclist) (1903-?), Dutch cyclist
- Gert Blomé (1934–2021), Swedish ice hockey player
- Gert Bolmer (born 1983), Dutch dressage equestrian
- Gert Bongers (born 1946), Dutch track cyclist
- Gert Brauer (1955–2018), German footballer
- Gert Cannaerts (born 1963), Belgian footballer
- Gert Claessens (born 1972), Belgian footballer
- Gert Coetzer (1940s—2018), South African rugby player
- Gert De Kock (born 1980), South African rugby player
- Gert Dockx (born 1988), Belgian road cyclist
- Gert Dorbek (born 1985), Estonian basketball player
- Gert Dörfel (born 1939), German footballer
- Gert Doumen (born 1971), Belgian football goalkeeper
- Gert Eg (born 1954), Danish footballer
- Gert Elsässer (born 1949), Austrian skeleton racer
- Gert Engels (born 1957), German footballer
- Gert Frank (1956–2019), Danish cyclist
- Gert Fredriksson (1919-2006), Swedish sprint canoer and coach
- Gert Handberg (born 1969), Danish motorcycle racer
- Gert Heerkes (born 1965), Dutch football manager
- Gert Heidler (born 1948), German footballer
- Gert Bo Jacobsen (born 1961), Danish boxer
- Gert Jakobs (born 1964), Dutch racing cyclist
- Gert Jõeäär (born 1987), Estonian road bicycle racer
- Gert Kams (born 1985), Estonian footballer
- Gert Kleinert (born 1930s), East German slalom canoeist
- Gert Kölli (1940–2016), Austrian swimmer
- Gert Krenn, Austrian bobsledder
- Gert Kruys (born 1961), Dutch football player and manager
- Gert Kullamäe (born 1971), Estonian basketball player
- Gert Jan Lebbink (born 1961), Dutch sprint canoer
- Gert Lotter (born 1993), Namibian cricketer and rugby player
- Gert Lundqvist (1937–2001), Swedish footballer
- Gert Metz (1942–2021), German sprinter
- Gert Muller (rugby union, born 1948), South African rugby union player
- Gert Muller (rugby union, born 1986), South African rugby union player
- Gert Olesk (born 1973), Estonian footballer
- Gert Peens (born 1974), South African-born Italian rugby player
- Gert Pettersson (born 1950s), Swedish orienteering competitor
- Gert Potgieter (athlete) (born 1937), South African hurdle runner
- Gert Remmel (born 1975), Estonian footballer and coach
- Gert Schalkwyk (born 1982), South African footballer
- Gert Jan Schlatmann (born 1963), Dutch field hockey player
- Gert Smal (born 1961), South African rugby player
- Gert Steegmans (born 1980), Belgian road bicycle racer
- Gert Thys (born 1971), South African long-distance runner
- Gert Trasha (born 1988), Albanian weightlifter
- Gert Trinklein (1949–2017), German footballer
- Gert van der Merwe, South African paralympic athlete
- Gert Van Walle (born 1987), Belgian volleyball player
- Gert Verheyen (born 1970), Belgian retired footballer
- Gert Weil (born 1960), Chilean retired shot putter
- Gert Wieczorkowski (born 1948), German footballer
- Gert Jan van Woudenberg (born 1951), Dutch rower
- Gert Wünsche (born 1943), German footballer

== Arts and entertainment ==
- Gert Bettens (born 1970), Belgian guitarist
- Gert Chesi (born 1940), Austrian photographer, author, journalist and filmmaker
- Gert van Egen (c. 1550–1612), Flemish sculptor active in Denmark
- Gert Fredholm (born 1941), Danish film director and screenwriter
- Karl Gerhart Gert Fröbe (1913–1988), German actor
- Gert Fylking (born 1945), Swedish actor, journalist, politician and anchorman
- Gert van Groningen (died 1577), Dutch-born sculptor active in Denmark
- Gert Haucke (1929–2008), German film and television actor
- Gert Helbemäe (1913–1974), Estonian writer and journalist
- Gert Hildebrand (born 1953), German car designer
- Gert Hofbauer (1937–2017), Austrian conductor and trumpeter
- Gert Günther Hoffmann (1929–1997), German actor and director
- Gert Hofmann (1931–1993), German writer and literary scholar
- Gert Jonke (1946-2009), Austrian poet, playwright and novelist
- Gert Kark, Estonian television producer
- Gert Krawinkel (1947–2014), German guitarist known as "Kralle"
- Robert Gerhard Gert Ledig (1921–1999), German writer
- Gert Louis Lamartine (1898–1966), German painter, sculptor and interior designer
- Gert Miltzow (1629–1668), Norwegian clergyman, theologian and historical writer
- Gert Neuhaus (born 1939), German artist
- Gert Nygårdshaug (born 1946), Norwegian author
- Gert Palmcrantz (born 1938), Swedish sound engineer
- Gert Potgieter (tenor) (1929–1977), South African tenor
- Gert Prokop (1932–1994), German science fiction writer
- Gert Sellheim (1901–1970), German-Australian artist
- Gert Smit (1944–1998), South African singer known as "Gene Rockwell"
- Gert van den Bergh (1920–1968), South African film actor
- Gert Verhulst (born 1968), Belgian television presenter, actor and singer
- Gert Vlok Nel (born 1963), South African poet
- Gert Voss (1941–2014), German actor
- Gert Wiescher (1944–2022), German graphic artist, type designer and author
- Gert Wilden (1917–2015), German film composer
- Gert Wingårdh (born 1951), Swedish architect
- Gert Heinrich Wollheim (1894–1974), German painter

== Politics and military ==
- Gert Alberts (1836–1927), South African Voortrekker
- Gert Bastian (1923–1992), German military officer and politician
- Gerrit Gert van den Berg (politician) (born 1935), Dutch politician
- Gert Boshoff (1931–2014), South African Army lieutenant general
- Gert Haller (1944–2010), German politician and manager
- Gert Jeschonnek (1912–1999), German navy officer
- Gert Petersen (1927-2009), Danish journalist and politician who helped found the Socialist People's Party
- Gert Rosenthal (born 1935), Guatemalan diplomat
- Gerhardus Gert Rudolph (1797–1851), South African Voortrekker and political leader
- Gerrit Gert Schutte (1939-2022), Dutch politician
- Richard Gert Sibande (1907–1987), South African political activist
- Gert Weisskirchen (born 1944), German politician
- Gert Willner (1940–2000), German politician

== Science and math ==
- Gert Holstege (born 1948), Dutch neuroscientist
- Gert Korthof, Dutch biologist
- Gert Mittring (born 1966), German mental calculator
- Gert Cornelius Nel (1885–1950), South African botanist
- Gert Sabidussi (1929–2022), Austrian mathematician
- Gert Spaargaren (born 1954), Dutch environmental sociologist

== Board games ==
- Gert Ligterink (born 1949), Dutch chess player
- Gert Schnider (born 1979), Austrian board-game player
- Gert Jan Timmerman (born 1956), Dutch correspondence chess player

== Business ==
- Gertrude Gert Boyle (1924–2019), German-born American businesswoman
- Gert Joubert (born 1948), Namibian businessperson
- Gert Van Mol (born 1969), Belgian entrepreneur and CEO

== Other fields ==
- Gert Postel (born 1958), German impostor
- Gert Schramm (1928–2016), German concentration camp survivor
- Cornelius Gerhardus Gert van Rooyen (1938–1990), South African pedophile and serial killer

== Fictional characters ==
- One of the title characters of Gert and Daisy, a British film and radio comedy act
- One of the title characters of the TV series Samson en Gert, a Flemish children's series
- Gertrude Yorkes, a Marvel Comics superheroine and member of The Runaways

== See also ==
- Gert-Åke Bengtsson (born 1948), Swedish sports shooter
- Gert-Arne Nilsson (born 1941), Swedish footballer
- Gert-Dietmar Klause (born 1945), East German cross-country skier
- Gert-Inge Sigfridsson (born 1946), Swedish footballer
- Gert-Jan Bruggink (born 1981), Dutch show jumping equestrian
- Gert-Jan Dröge (1943–2007), Dutch television presenter
- Gert-Jan Liefers (born 1978), Dutch middle distance runner
- Gert-Jan Oplaat (born 1964), Dutch politician
- Gert-Jan Prins (born 1961), Dutch free improvisation musician
- Gert-Jan Segers (born 1969), Dutch political scientist and politician
- Gert-Jan Tamerus (born 1980), Dutch footballer
- Gert-Jan Theunisse (born 1963), Dutch road cyclist
- Gert-Johan Coetzee (born 1987), South African fashion designer
- Gert-René Polli (born 1960), Austrian police officer
- Geert, given name
- Olga Gert (born 1959), Russian Feminist
