= Gertz =

Gertz is a surname. Notable people with the surname include:

- Alejandro Gertz Manero (born 1939), Mexican lawyer and politician
- Alison Gertz (1966–1992), American AIDS activist
- Bill Gertz (born 1952), American editor, columnist and reporter
- Bruce Gertz (born 1952), American jazz musician
- Elmer Gertz (1906–2000), American jurist and activist
- Irving Gertz (1915–2008), American composer
- Jami Gertz (born 1965), American actress
- Marc Gertz, American criminologist
- Nurith Gertz (born 1940), Israeli academic
- Sebastian Gertz, British-German historian of philosophy
- Wanda Gertz (1896–1958), Polish soldier and male impersonator
- William L. Gertz (born 1952), American CEO

== See also ==
- Floris Gerts (born 1992), Dutch cyclist
- Gertz (department store)
- Gertz v. Robert Welch, Inc.
- Geers
- Geerts
- Geertz
- Gertze
- Gert (disambiguation)
- Gers (disambiguation)
- Gerz
- Goertz
