= Gertze =

Gertze is a surname. Notable people with the surname include:

- Johanna Gertze (1836–1935), Namibian Herero and Christian convert
- Kalla Gertze (1960–2008), Namibian university lecturer and parliamentarian
- Neville Gertze (born 1966), Namibian diplomat
- Odile Gertze (born c. 1988), Namibian beauty queen

== See also ==
- Geers
- Geerts
- Geertz
- Goertz
- Gertz
- Gerz
- Gers (disambiguation)
