= Gers (disambiguation) =

Gers is a department of France.

Gers may also refer to:

== Places ==
- Gers (river), in France, tributary of the Garonne
- Gers (Schwalm), a river of Hesse, Germany, tributary of the Schwalm
- Lac de Gers (Gers Lake), Haute-Savoie, France

== People ==
- Gers Pardoel (born 1981), Dutch rapper

=== People with the surname ===
- Janick Gers (born 1957), English musician
- Felix Gers, professor of computer science at Beuth University Berlin
- Ilke Gers (born 1981), retired New Zealand tennis player

== Other uses ==
- Government Expenditure and Revenue Scotland (GERS), an annual estimate of the Scottish economy
- Rangers F.C., nickname Gers, a football club in Glasgow, Scotland

== See also ==
- Ger (disambiguation)
- Gert (disambiguation)
- Gerz
- Gertz
- Gertze
- Geertz
- Geerts
- Geers
- Goertz
