= Gert (disambiguation) =

Gert is a given name, usually masculine.

Gert may also refer to:

== People with the surname ==
- Bernard Gert (born 1934), moral philosopher and university professor
- Valeska Gert (1892-1978), German Jewish dancer and cabaret artist

== Places ==
- Gert, Michigan, United States, a former settlement
- Gert Town, New Orleans, Louisiana, United States, a city neighborhood

== Other uses ==
- List of storms named Gert, seven tropical cyclones in the Atlantic Ocean
- Graphical Evaluation and Review Technique or GERT, a network analysis technique used in project management

== See also ==
- Floris Gerts (born 1992), Dutch cyclist
- Geertz
- Gertze
- Gertz
- Gerz
- Gers (disambiguation)
