= 1943 in association football =

The following is a list of football (soccer) events of the year 1943 throughout the world.

== Events ==
- Cartagines defeat Espanola by the extraordinary score of 9-8 in the Costa Rican First Division.

== Winners club national championship ==
- Argentina: Boca Juniors
- Austria: Vienna
- Chile: Unión Española
- Costa Rica: Universidad de Costa Rica
- Croatia: Građanski Zagreb
- Germany: Dresdner SC
- Italy: Torino F.C.
- Mexico: Mars
- Paraguay: Libertad
- Scotland
- Scottish Cup: No competition
- Spain: Athletic Bilbao
- Sweden: IFK Norrköping
- Switzerland: Grasshoppers
- Turkey: Fenerbahçe
- Uruguay: Nacional

== Births ==
- 24 January – Manuel Velázquez, Spanish international footballer (died 2016)
- 19 February – Gert Wünsche, former German footballer
- 13 March – Giancarlo De Sisti, Italian international footballer
- 20 March – Billy Howells, English professional footballer
- 25 April – Angelo Anquilletti, Italian international footballer (died 2015)
- 4 May – Georgi Asparuhov, Bulgarian international footballer (died 1971)
- 16 May – Ove Kindvall, Swedish international footballer
- 3 June – Werner Lihsa, East German international footballer
- 14 June – Piet Keizer, Dutch international footballer (died 2017)
- 18 August – Gianni Rivera, Italian international footballer
- 10 September – Horst-Dieter Höttges, German international footballer
- 29 September – Wolfgang Overath, German international footballer
- 26 October – Tommy Gemmell, Scottish international footballer and manager (died 2017)
- 28 October – Pim Doesburg, Dutch international footballer (died 2020)
- 6 November – Roberto Telch, Argentine international footballer (died 2014)
- 7 December – Akbar Eftekhari, Iranian international footballer (died 2017)
- 22 December – Juan Mujica, Uruguayan international footballer and manager (died 2016)

== Deaths ==
- 9 March – Franz Krumm (33), German international footballer (born 1909)
- 30 April – Eddy Hamel, (40), American footballer (born 1902; killed in Auschwitz)
- 10 October – Frits Kuipers (44), Dutch footballer (born 1899)
