= Charles Geerts =

Charles Geerts may refer to:

- Charles Geerts (businessman) (born 1943), Dutch brothel owner
- Charles Geerts (footballer) (1930–2015), Belgian footballer
