= Wünsche =

Wünsche is a German surname.

== People ==
- August Wünsche (1838–1912), German Christian Hebraist
- Florian Wünsche (born 1991), German actor
- Gert Wünsche (born 1943), German footballer
- Kurt Wünsche (born 1929), German politician and twice Minister of Justice of the German Democratic Republic
- Max Wünsche (1914–1995), regimental commander in the Waffen-SS during World War II
- Vilém Wünsche (1900–1984), Czech painter, graphic artist and illustrator

== See also ==
- Die tödlichen Wünsche, opera by Giselher Klebe
- Wünsche fliegen übers Meer, eleventh studio album released by German Schlager group Die Flippers
