= Geer (disambiguation) =

Geer is a municipality in Belgium.

Geer may also refer to:

== People ==
=== Given name ===
- Geer van Velde (1898–1977), a Dutch painter

=== Surname ===
- Billy Geer (1859–1885), an American baseball player
- Charles Geer (1922–2008), an American illustrator and author
- Charlotte Geer (born 1957), an American Olympic rower
- Dan Geer, an American computer security analyst
- Ellen Geer (born 1941), an American actress
- Helen Thornton Geer (1903–1983), an American author, professor, and librarian
- Isaac Wheeler Geer (1873–1953), an American railroad executive
- John van de Geer (1926–2008), Dutch psychologist
- Josh Geer (born 1983), an American baseball player
- Kevin Geer (1954–2017), an American actor
- Letitia Mumford Geer (1852–1935), American nurse and inventor of single-handed syringe
- Martha A. Geer, an American judge
- Peter Zack Geer (1928–1977), an American politician
- Ralph Carey Geer (1816–1895), an American farmer and politician
- Sara van de Geer (born 1958), Dutch statistician
- Theodore Thurston Geer (1851–1924), an American politician
- Trevor Geer (born 1953), a British speedway racer
- Will Geer (1902–1978), an American actor
- William Dudley Geer (1922–2003), an American educator

== Places ==
- Geer, Vijfheerenlanden, Netherlands
- Geer, Virginia, United States
- Geer, Michigan, United States
- Geer River, or Jeker, in Belgium and the Netherlands

== See also ==
- De Geer, a family of Walloon origin
- Geers, a surname
- Gear (disambiguation)
- Geare, a surname
- Gere (disambiguation)
