= Gear (disambiguation) =

A gear is a toothed wheel designed to transmit torque to another gear or toothed component.

Gear or gears may also refer to:

== Arts, entertainment and media ==
=== Fictional characters ===
- Gear (Static Shock), name used by Richie Foley in Static Shock
- Gears, a character from the G.I. Joe franchise
- Gears, a character from the Transformers franchise

=== Other uses in arts, entertainment and media ===
- Gears (album), a 1975 album by Johnny Hammond
- Gear (Image Comics), a 1998 comic book limited series by Image Comics
- Gear (magazine), an American men's magazine
- GEAR (theatre show), a Japanese long-run theatre show
- Gear (The Village Voice), a 1969 character sketch

== Science and technology ==
- First gear, second gear, etc., chosen using a gear stick to adjust how a car accelerates
- Gears (software), formerly Google Gears, utility software by Google
- Landing gear, the undercarriage of an aircraft
- Samsung Gear, a line of wearable computing devices

== Other uses ==
- Gear (name), including a list of people with the name
- Gender Equality Architecture Reform, an international NGO campaign
- Geared, maritime transport vessels equipped with cranes
- USS Gear (ARS-34), a 1942 U.S. Navy ship

== See also ==
- Gearing (disambiguation)
- Geer (disambiguation)
- Top Gear (disambiguation)
- Geare, a surname
- Computer configuration
- Game Gear, Handheld game console
- System Settings, an application included with macOS
- Settings (Windows), a component of Microsoft Windows
- Equipment
- A common British street slang term for recreational psychoactive or narcotic drugs and performance-enhancing anabolic steroids
