= Ger =

Ger or GER may refer to:

== People ==
=== Given name ===
- Ger Blok (1939–2016), Dutch football manager
- Ger Brennan, Irish Gaelic footballer
- Ger Canning (born 1951), Irish sports commentator
- Ger Cunningham (Limerick hurler) (born 1972), Irish hurling coach, manager and former player
- Ger Duany (born 1978), South Sudanese actor and model
- Ger Egan (born 1990/1991), Westmeath Gaelic footballer
- Ger van Elk (1941–2014), Dutch artist
- Ger Feeney (c. 1954–2010), Irish Gaelic footballer
- Ger Farragher (born 1983), Irish hurler
- Ger Henderson (born 1954), Irish hurler
- Ger Lynch (born 1958), Irish Gaelic footballer, Irish name: Gearóid Ó Loingsigh
- Ger Manley (born 1968), Irish hurler, Irish name: Gearóid Ó Manlaí
- Ger Maycock (1970–2006), Irish artist
- Ger O'Driscoll (Gaelic footballer), Irish Gaelic footballer
- Ger O'Driscoll (hurler) (born 1987), Irish hurler, Irish name: Gearóid Ó Drisceoil
- Ger Reddin (born 1988), Irish hurler, Irish name: Gearóid Ó Roideáin
- Ger Reidy (Gaelic footballer) (born 1986), Irish Gaelic footballer, Irish name: Gearoid Ó Riada
- Ger Ryan, Irish actress
- Ger Spillane (born 1981), Irish Gaelic footballer, Irish name: Gearóid Ó Spealáin

=== Nickname ===
- Gerrit Ger Challa (born 1928), Dutch chemist
- Gerald Ger Connolly (born 1937), Irish politician
- Gerald Ger Cunningham (born 1961), Irish hurler
- Gerald Ger Houlahan, Irish Gaelic footballer
- Gerrit Ger Lagendijk (1941–2010), Dutch footballer
- Gerard Ger Loughnane (born 1953), Irish hurler
- Gerard Ger McDonnell (1971–2008), Irish mountaineer
- Gerald Ger Robinson (born 1982), Irish association footballer
- Gerardus Ger Senden (born 1971), Dutch footballer

=== Other people ===
- Ger (Hasidic dynasty), a Polish dynasty
- A convert to Judaism

== Places ==
- Ger, Girona, Catalonia, Spain
- Ger, Hautes-Pyrénées, France
- Ger, Manche, France
- Ger, Pyrénées-Atlantiques, France
- Ger district, a type of residential district in Mongolia
- Ger River, in Saint Lucia
- Góra Kalwaria (Yiddish: Ger), Mazovian Voivodship, Poland
- Shiquanhe, Tibet, historically called Ger

== Acronyms ==
- Gastroesophageal reflux
- Granular endoplasmic reticulum
- Great Eastern Railway, a British railway company
- Great Eastern Run, a running event in Peterborough, United Kingdom
- Gross enrolment ratio

== Codes ==
- Germany, IOC and UNDP codes
- ger, German language ISO 639-2/B code
- Gerrards Cross railway station, Buckinghamshire, National Rail station code GER
- Rafael Cabrera Mustelier Airport, serving Nueva Gerona, Cuba, IATA code GER

== Language and writing ==
- Ger (rune), of the Anglo-Saxon futhark
- Gerund, abbreviation ger

== Other uses ==
- Ger (magazine), an online Mongolian magazine
- Migration Period spear
- Yurt (Mongolian: гэр)

== See also ==
- Gers (disambiguation)
