= Salix carmanica =

Scientific classification
- Kingdom: Plantae
- Clade: Tracheophytes
- Clade: Angiosperms
- Clade: Eudicots
- Clade: Rosids
- Order: Malpighiales
- Family: Salicaceae
- Genus: Salix
- Species: S. carmanica

Binomial name
- Salix carmanica Bornm. ex Goerz

Shrub in the genus of willows

Salix carmanica is a species of willow found in Iran, in Afghanistan, and in China where it is cultivated. It large shrub with blue-green bark and yellowish, drooping branches. The leaf blades reach lengths of 3 to 5 centimeters, with young shoots even more.

== Taxonomy ==
The species was described in 1934 by Rudolf Goerz.

== Description ==
Salix carmanica is a shrub up to 6 meters high with a smooth, blue-green bark . The branches are yellowish, drooping, thin and bare. The leaves have linear, about 2 millimeters long, deciduous stipules with a serrated leaf margin. The leaf blade is obsolete, 3 to 5 centimeters long and 5 to 7 millimeters wide, also longer on young shoots, short pointed, with a wedge-shaped base and a finely serrated leaf margin. Both sides of the leaf are colored the same, initially slightly tomentose and later almost bare.

Male inflorescences are unknown. The female inflorescences are 1 to 2.5 centimeters long catkins with an approximately 1 centimeter long, tomentose-haired stem with two to three leaves. The bracts are yellowish green, oblong-obovate, about 1.5 millimeters long, with a truncated, edged tip, and bare underside. They fall off as the fruit ripens. The female flowers have a linear-lanceolate, about 1 millimeter long, glabrous or slightly hairy, sterile and 1 millimeter long stalked ovary . The stylus is about 0.4 millimeters long, the scaris two- to four-lobed. Salix carmanica flowers around the time the leaves shoot in May.

== Range ==
The natural range is in Iran, Afghanistan, and Chinese Xinjiang.

== Literature ==
- Wu Zheng-yi, Peter H. Raven (Hrsg.): Flora of China. Volume 4: Cycadaceae through Fagaceae. Science Press/Missouri Botanical Garden Press, Beijing/St. Louis 1999, ISBN 0-915279-70-3, p. 267, 270 (englisch).
- Rudolf Görz: Einige kritische Salices aus Persien. Repertorium specierum novarum regni vegetabilis, vol. 35, Berlin-Dahlem 1934, p. 283–292.
