= Lamartine (disambiguation) =

Lamartine may refer to:

- Alphonse de Lamartine (1790-1869), a French writer and politician, husband of Elisa
- Elisa de Lamartine (1790–1863), French painter and sculptor, wife of Alphonse
- Gert Louis Lamartine (1898–1966), German painter, sculptor and interior designer
- Lamartine Babo, Brazilian musician

== Places ==
- Lamartine, Ohio, an obsolete name for a post office in Ohio
- Lamartine, Wisconsin, a town in Fond du Lac County
  - Lamartine (community), Wisconsin, an unincorporated community located in the above town
- Lamartine (shipwreck), off Gloucester, Massachusetts
- Lamartine Place Historic District, in Manhattan, New York City
- Lamartine, Quebec
