= William Gertz =

William Gertz could refer to:

- Bill Gertz (born 1952), American journalist
- William L. Gertz (born 1952), American business executive
