= Henry Goddard =

Henry Goddard may refer to:

- Henry Arthur Goddard (1869–1955), Australian soldier
- Henry H. Goddard (1866–1957), American psychologist and eugenicist
- Henry W. Goddard (1876–1955), federal judge in New York City
- Henry Goddard (architect) (1813–1899), English architect

== See also ==
- Goddard (disambiguation)
