= Guerrilla publishing =

Guerrilla publishing is a catchall term that encompasses many different low budget efforts at self-publishing and micro publishing. Some restrict the use of the term to mean only the publishing of books and pamphlets by employees who use their employers' office supplies to produce their books, but current usage of the term also includes what in the past would have been called small press publishers and zines.

The term "guerrilla publishing" was first used in 1988 at the Catholic University of Louvain, Belgium by student leader Gert Van Mol. Van Mol] continued to establish his proper Publishing Company after mastering at the university. Typically to illustrate 'Publishing is Guerrilla', the entrance of the company was staged as a war zone.
