= Gearing =

Gearing may refer to:

== Engineering ==
- Gear ratio
- Mechanical advantage
- Gear train, an arrangement of gears

== Military ==
- Gearing family, whose members served in the US Navy
- USS Gearing (DD-710), a destroyer of the US Navy
- Gearing-class destroyer, a group of destroyers in the US Navy

== Other uses ==
- Leverage (finance), also known as gearing
- Ashley Gearing (born 1991), country music singer
- Chris Gearing (born 1986), British strongman

== See also ==
- Gear (disambiguation)
