= Godard (disambiguation) =

Jean-Luc Godard (1930–2022) was a French-Swiss filmmaker.

Godard may also refer to:

- Godard (surname), includes a list of people with the surname
- "Godard", composition from the compilation album Godard/Spillane by John Zorn

== See also ==
- Saint Godard (disambiguation)
- Goddard (disambiguation)
- Gotthard (disambiguation)
