= Gorz =

Gorz may refer to:

== Places ==
- Gorz, Iran, a village in Sistan and Baluchestan Province, Iran
- Gorizia (German: Görz), a town and comune in northeastern Italy
  - County of Gorizia (1117–1500; German: Grafschaft Görz, lit. 'County of Görz'), a princely state of the Holy Roman Empire, with its capital in what is now Gorizia, Italy
  - Princely County of Gorizia and Gradisca (Goritz; 1754–1919; German: Gefürstete Grafschaft Görz und Gradisca)

== People ==
- House of Gorizia (German: Grafen von Görz, lit. 'Counts of Görz'), a noble house
- André Gorz (1923–2007), pen name of Gérard Horst, Austrian/French philosopher

== Other uses ==
- IRIS Gorz (P228) (Persian: گرز, lit. 'Mace'), Kaman-class fast attack craft of Iran

== See also ==
- Gors
- Goerz
- Gerz
