= Goer =

Goer may refer to:

- M520 Goer, an amphibious vehicle
- Goertek, also known as GoerTek, a Chinese company

== People with the surname ==
- Henci Goer (21st century), American author
