= Geertz =

Geertz is a German surname.

People with this surname include:

- Clifford Geertz (1926–2006), U.S. anthropologist
- Hildred Geertz (1927–2022; née Storey), U.S. anthropologist, wife of Clifford Geertz
- Julius Geertz (1837–1902), German artist
- Uwe Geertz, U.S. psychiatrist involved in Church of Scientology International v. Fishman and Geertz [CV 91-6426 (HLH (Tx))]

== See also ==
- Geers
- Geerts
- Gertze
- Gertz
- Gert (disambiguation)
- Gers (disambiguation)
