= Geerts =

Geerts is a Dutch patronymic surname, meaning "son of Geert". Notable people with the surname include:

- André Geerts (1955–2010), Belgian comics author, creator of Jojo
- Charles Geerts (1930–2015), Belgian football goalkeeper
- Charles Geerts (born 1943), Dutch brothel owner
- Christiane Geerts (born 1940s), Belgian racing cyclist
- Geert Geerts, birth name of Erasmus (c.1467-1536), Dutch Renaissance humanist
- Frans Geerts (1869–1957), Belgian painter
- Jago Geerts (born 2000), Belgian motocross rider
- Karel Hendrik Geerts (1807–1855), Belgian sculptor
- Paul Geerts (born 1937), Belgian comic strip author, Spike and Suzy
- Wim Geerts (born ca. 1963), Dutch ambassador and Secretary of Defense

== See also ==
- Geert
- Geurts (disambiguation)
