= Gert Lundqvist =

Swedish footballer

Personal information
- Full name: Gert Lundqvist
- Date of birth: 16 February 1937
- Date of death: 2001
- Position: Defender

Senior career*
| Years | Team | Apps | (Gls) |
| 1954–1962 | Malmö FF | 107 | (5) |
- * Club domestic league appearances and goals

Gert Lundqvist (16 February 1937 – 2001) was a Swedish footballer who played as a defender.
