= Gors Castle =

Castle in Gors-Opleeuw, Belgium

- Belgium
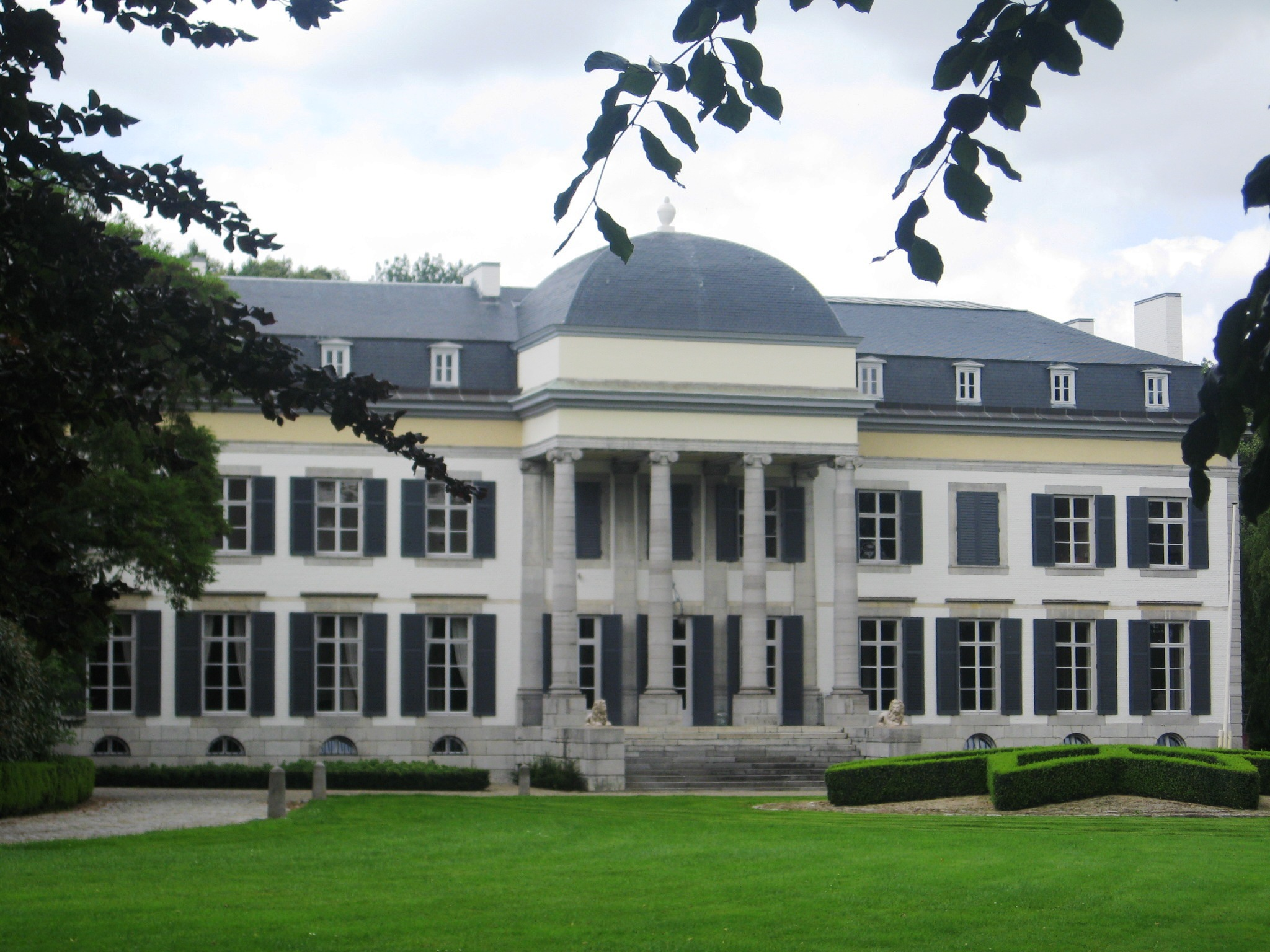

Site information
- Type: Castle

Location
- Coordinates: 50.8243°N 5.3958°E

Gors Castle (Dutch: Kasteel van Gors) is a 19th-century country house, in Gors-Opleeuw in the municipality of Borgloon, province of Limburg, Belgium.

The original structure was a house of the 17th century, which was almost entirely rebuilt in the 1820s in a Neo-Classical style. The farm that was originally attached to the house was demolished in 1865 and rebuilt further away. Both house and farm have been protected monuments since 1986.

== See also ==
- List of castles in Belgium
