= Geer, Vijfheerenlanden =

Geer
- Hamlet
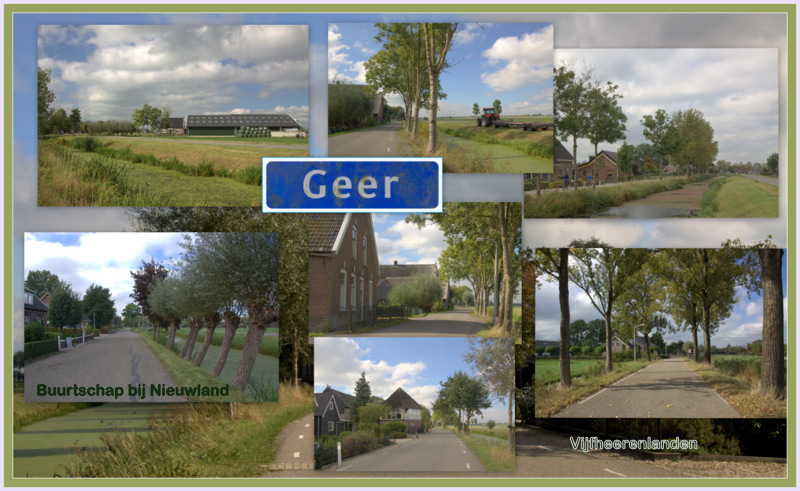
- Postcard of Geer

- Location in the Netherlands Geer (Netherlands)
- Coordinates: 51°54′N 5°3′E
- Country: Netherlands
- Province: Utrecht
- Municipality: Vijfheerenlanden

Area
  - Total: 1.69 km^{2} (0.65 sq mi)

Population (2021)
  - Total: 110
  - Density: 65/km^{2} (170/sq mi)
- Time zone: UTC+1 (CET)
  - Summer (DST): UTC+2 (CEST)
- Postal code: 4243
- Dialing code: 0183

Geer is a hamlet in the Dutch province of Utrecht. It is a part of the municipality of Vijfheerenlanden, and lies about 9 km northeast of Gorinchem.

The hamlet was first mentioned in 1874 as Geer (De), and means "tapering piece of land". The postal authorities have placed it under Nieuwland. In 1840, it was home to 138 people.
