= Henci Goer =

American author

Henci Goer is an American author who writes about pregnancy and childbirth. She is the author of The Thinking Woman's Guide to a Better Birth. Her previous book, Obstetric Myths Versus Research Realities is a resource for childbirth professionals. Goer has written consumer education pamphlets and articles for magazines such as Reader's Digest, Birth, Journal of Perinatal Education, Midwifery today with international midwife, and the Journal of Perinatal & Neonatal Nursing. Previously appearing on ParentsPlace.com as the “Birth Guru,” she is currently a resident expert for the Lamaze Institute for Normal Birth Forum. Now concentrating on writing and speaking, Goer was a doula (labor support professional) for over 30 years and a Lamaze, (private interest) educator for twenty.

In 1993, she received the National Association of Childbearing Centers Media Award, and in 1995 ASPO/Lamaze presented her with its President's Award in recognition of her book, Obstetric Myths and Research Realities: A Guide to the Medical Literature (1995).

Henci served as project director and participated as an Expert Work Group member on the Coalition for Improving Maternity Services document “Evidence Basis for the Ten Steps of Mother-Friendly Care.”

Her most recent project is the Take Charge of Your Birth series—short books on single topics to help readers make informed choices and obtain optimal care for themselves and their babies.

== Bibliography ==
- Obstetric Myths Versus Research Realities: A Guide to the Medical Literature. Westport: Bergin and Garvey, 1995.
- The Thinking Woman's Guide to a Better Birth. Perigee Books, 1999.
- Optimal Care in Childbirth: The Case for a Physiologic Approach. Classic Day Publishing, 2012.
- Labor Pain: What's Your Best Strategy?: Get the Data. Make a Plan. Take Charge of Your Birth. S Press, 2022
