= Frans Geerts =

Belgian painter (1869-1957)

- Born: Augustinus Franciscus Maria Geerts; 14 September 1869; Antwerp, Belgium
- Died: 30 June 1957 (aged 87); Borgerhout, Antwerp, Belgium
- Other names: Franz Geerts; François Geerts
- Education: Royal Academy of Fine Arts (Antwerp)
- Known for: Oil paintings
- Style: Realism; Romanticism

Signature
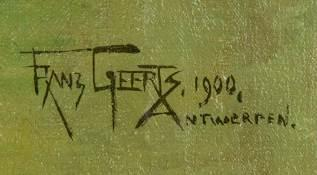

Frans Geerts (14 September 1869 in Antwerp – 30 June 1957 in Borgerhout) was a Belgian painter.

While Geerts predominantly made oil paintings, he also used watercolors and ink drawings to create realistic and romantic portraits, pastoral and religious scenes, and still lifes with flowers and landscapes. In addition to his original paintings, his works include numerous creative adaptations of well-known artists' works, such as Adriaen Brouwer, Václav Brožík, Henri De Braekeleer, and David Teniers II. Among these are a detailed copy of Pieter Bruegel the Elder's The Peasant Dance. While not prominent in Antwerp's artistic scene, he did gain relative commercial success, with his works now held in private collections and auctions both in Belgium and abroad.

Little is known about the life of Frans Geerts. From 1880 to 1886, he attended painting courses taught by Lucas Victor Schaefels at the Royal Academy of Fine Arts in Antwerp. He won the class' "ornement au trait d’après l’estampe" contest in 1884. His time at the academy overlapped briefly with Vincent van Gogh. Geerts married Anna Maria Maes in 1891 and they had a daughter. From the end of the 19th century until the end of the Second World War, he lived and worked as an artist in Borgerhout, Antwerp, where he died in 1957.
