= Goddard =

Goddard is a both a given name and a surname, which may refer to:

== People ==
- Goddard (given name)
- Goddard (surname)

== Places in the United States ==
- Goddard, Kansas
- Goddard, Kentucky
- Goddard, Maryland
- Goddard College, a low-residency college with campuses in Vermont and Washington
- Goddard Memorial State Park, Warwick, Rhode Island
- Homer, Indiana, also known as Goddard
- Maurice K. Goddard State Park, New Vernon Township, Pennsylvania

== Named after Robert H. Goddard ==
- Goddard (crater), a lunar crater along the eastern limb of the Moon
- Goddard High Resolution Spectrograph, a spectrograph installed on the Hubble Space Telescope
- Goddard High School (New Mexico), Roswell, New Mexico
- Goddard Space Flight Center, a major NASA space science laboratory in Greenbelt, Maryland
  - Goddard Institute for Space Studies, component laboratory of Goddard Space Flight Center
- Blue Origin Goddard, a private spacecraft which first flew in November 2006
- Version 13 of the popular Linux distribution Fedora, nicknamed Goddard
- Goddard, a robotic dog in the American animated television series The Adventures of Jimmy Neutron, Boy Genius

== Other uses ==
- Goddard & Gibbs, stained glass manufacturers

== See also ==
- Goddard–Thorn theorem, a mathematical theorem about certain vector spaces
- Maine penny, also known as the "Goddard coin"
- Godard (disambiguation)
