= Saint Godard =

Saint Godard may refer to:

- Saint Gildard (c. 448 – c. 525), Bishop of Rouen
- Gotthard of Hildesheim (960–1038), German bishop
