= Ger (magazine) =

Online Mongolian magazine

Ger (Ger is the Mongolian word for home and also for the traditional tent dwelling) was an online magazine launched in Mongolia in the late 1990s. The country's first online magazine, Ger became a much-cited source on the effects of the transition to free markets and democracy the country experienced throughout the 1990s.

== Overview ==
Ger was launched on September 9, 1998. The theme of youth in the transition was explored by a combined team of Mongolian and foreign journalists. The Ger Magazine project had basically three goals: first, raise the quality of journalism in the country, secondly, introduce the country to a wider global audience and, by being the country's first online magazine, prove the internet was an effective way to communicate. Stories tackled the struggle to find work in the free market, the booming pop music scene and how it is leading the way in business entrepreneurship, reproductive health, the basics on Mongolian culture, and vox pop views from Mongolian youth.

Issue 2 of the magazine investigated modern life in Mongolia during transition. Stories probed the proliferation of bars and the problem of alcoholism, corrupt banking practices and the loss of savings, how the young were the country's leading entrepreneurs, Mongolia's meat and milk diet, "girl power" and the strong role played by women, the burgeoning new media, the rise and rise of Buddhism, and Mongolia's dynamic fashion designers (this article inspired foreign fashion designers to embrace the Mongolian "look" in the next season's designs).

An online survey of the state of Mongolia's media and its history (http://www.pressreference.com/Ma-No/Mongolia.html), had this to say: "An interesting variation from some of the other publications available is Ger Magazine (published online with guidance from the United Nations Development Program, UNDP), which is concerned with Mongolian youth in cultural transition. The name of the magazine is meant to be ironic because a ger is the Mongolian word for yurt—a yurt being traditional nomadic housing—but the magazine is about urbanization and globalization of Mongolian youth."

== Staff ==
- Editor-in-chief: David South (1998-1999)
- Logo design: P. Davaa-Ochir
