= Billy Howells =

English footballer

Personal information
- Full name: William Mansel Howells
- Date of birth: 20 March 1943 (age 83)
- Place of birth: Grimsby, England
- Date of death: January 10, 2026
- Height: 5 ft 10 in (1.78 m)
- Position: Defender

Senior career*
Years	Team	Apps	(Gls)
1961–1965	Grimsby Town	6	(0)
1965–1975	Boston United	572	(25)
- * Club domestic league appearances and goals

William Mansel Howells (born 20 March 1943) was an English former professional footballer who played as a defender. He played in the Football League for Grimsby Town before moving into non-league football with Boston United, where he set a record for most first-team appearances for the club with 572. His record was overtaken by Paul Bastock in 2003, Howells attending a pre-season game to present the goalkeeper with an award to mark the achievement. Howells remains the club's record outfield appearance holder.

During his time at Boston United, he played under the management of Don Donovan, Jim Smith and Keith Jobling; having signed in 1965 as the Pilgrims re-joined the Non-League sphere. Winners of the 1965/66 United Counties League, Howells and his teammates then secured back to back West Midlands League titles before joining the inaugural Northern Premier League in 1968.

Howells would feature heavily in championship winning teams in 1973 and 1975, including scoring the title-clinching goal in a 1-1 draw with Goole in '73. Alongside his five league titles, Howells contributed to eight cup successes: the United Counties League Cup (1965/66), West Midlands League Cup (1967/68), Eastern Professional Floodlit Cup (1971/72), Champion of Champions Cup (1972/73), the Northern Premier League Cup (1973/74 and 1975/76) and the NPL Shield (1973/75 and 1974/75).

He died in January 2026, at the age of 82.
