= Tom Geurts =

Dutch economist

Tom Geerd Geurts (born in Dedemsvaart on April 2, 1964) is a Dutch economist currently employed by Bucknell University and an Honorary Professor at the Technische Universität Berlin. Current Chair of the Education Committee of the American Real Estate Society (ARES), and previously Director of Academic Affairs of the Schack institute of New York University. He wrote numerous presentations and publications in the field of Real Estate and Finance, for example in the field of Security Market Line. He is the son of Joop Geurts.
