= Government Operational Research Service =

UK government body

In the United Kingdom, the Government Operational Research Service (GORS) supports and champions Operational Research across government. GORS currently supports policy-making, strategy and operations in many different departments and agencies across the United Kingdom and employs over 1000 analysts, ranging from sandwich students to members of the Senior Civil Service.
