= Joop Geurts =

Dutch baseball player (1923–2009)

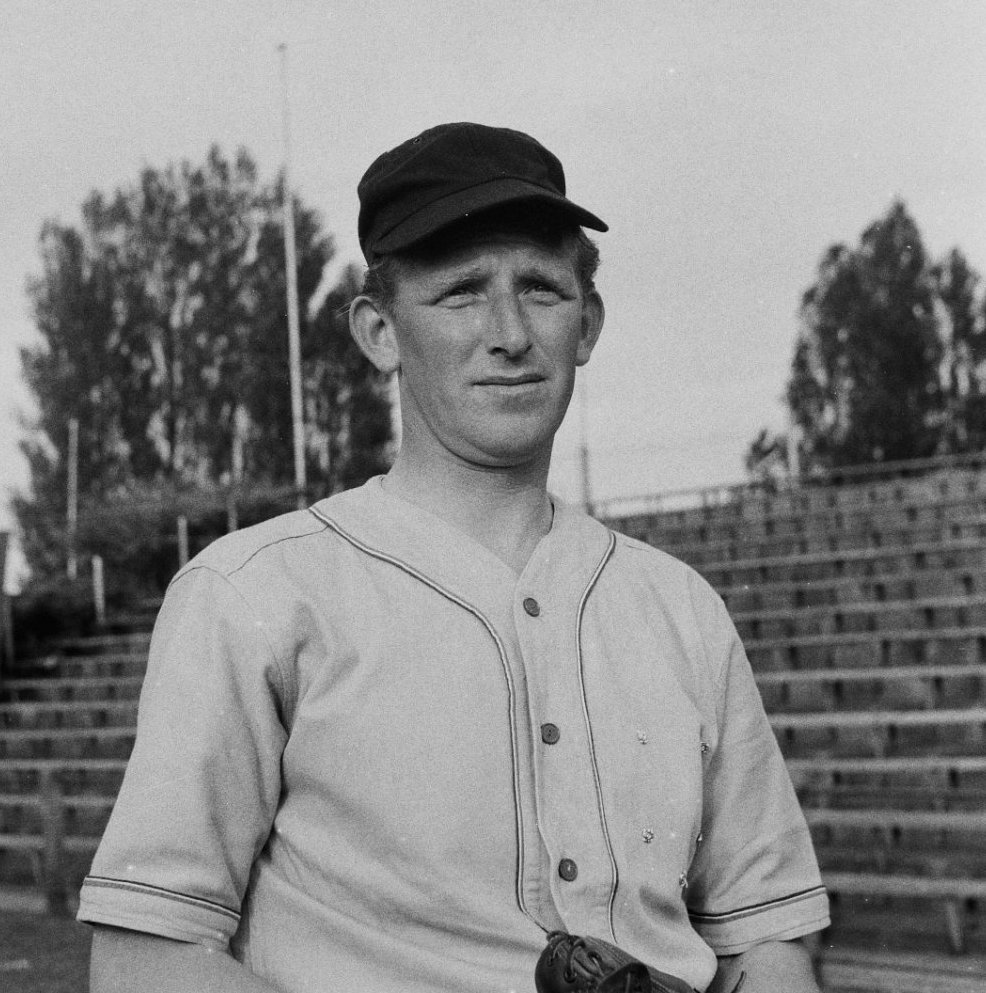
- Catcher
- Born: February 20, 1923; Haarlem, Netherlands
- Died: February 26, 2009 (aged 86); Haarlem, Netherlands
- Batted: right Threw: right
Medals
Men's baseball
Representing Netherlands
European Championship
Gold medal – first place	1956 Rome	Team
Gold medal – first place	1957 Mannheim	Team
Gold medal – first place	1958 Amsterdam	Team
Gold medal – first place	1960 Barcelona	Team

Joop Geurts (February 20, 1923 – February 26, 2009) was a Dutch baseball player for the Netherlands national baseball team in international competitions. He also played for Schoten Haarlem of the Honkbal Hoofdklasse, the top Dutch baseball league.

== Career ==
Geurts made his debut in the Dutch national team in 1938 as a catcher, at only 15 years of age. In 1957, he was named most valuable player of the Main Class. From 1956 to 1960, he captured the European championship four times with the Dutch team. He was named one of the best catchers at the 1958 championship. Geurts appeared in 36 games over 23 years for the national team. In 1956, he was the captain of the team that visited the United States for the first time, competing in the Global World Series.

Geurts was also involved in an incident in 1948 with a baseball signed by American ambassador Herman B. Baruch. The ambassador was invited to throw the first ball at the start of a game between Haarlem and Amsterdam clubs. Baruch threw the ball to Geurts, who had Baruch sign the ball, then kept it. However, baseball league board members later asked Geurts to return the signed ball. He refused and decided to visit the American embassy in The Hague to get Baruch to sign a second ball. At an open meeting to decide Geurts' fate, he showed the two signed balls and asked the league officials to choose one, which he gave to the leagues, while keeping the other one.

Years later, Geurts was asked by the administrators of the Netherlands Baseball Museum if he still had the ball in question. He sent his son Tom Geurts to the attic to search, and his son found the ball. The Haarlem-based museum has one of the signed balls.

== Personal life and death ==
Geurts worked for a ground boring company.

Geurts died on February 26, 2009, at the age of 86 in Haarlem. Geurts had some health issues in the final years of his life, however the exact cause of death was not released to the public.
