= Sebastian Gertz =

British-German historian of philosophy

Sebastian Ramon Philipp Gertz is a British-German historian of Ancient Philosophy.

In 2010 he received his PhD from Gonville and Caius College, Cambridge, with a dissertation on the ancient commentaries on Plato's Phaedo by Damascius and Olympiodorus (published under the title Death and Immortality in Late Neoplatonism by Brill in 2011).

Between 2010 and 2012, Sebastian Gertz was Assistant Editor to the Ancient Commentators on Aristotle Project at King's College London, where he contributed a translation of Zacharias of Mytilene's dialogue Ammonius to the series (published together with John Dillon and Donald Russell's translation of Aeneas of Gaza's Theophrastus) (see Gaza Triad).

He was elected to the position of Supernumerary Teaching Fellow in Philosophy at St John's College, Oxford in 2012.

He is currently an independent researcher and continues to be interested in late antique philosophy, especially Neoplatonism. His most recent publications have explored the connection between Gnosticism and Neoplatonism and the teaching of ancient philosophy in the late 6th century.
