= R. Görs & Kallmann =

Piano manufacturer in Berlin

- Company type: Private
- Industry: Musical instruments, piano manufacturing
- Founded: 1877
- Founder: Robert Görs
- Headquarters: Berlin, Germany
- Area served: Europe, Africa
- Key people: Robert Görs, Friedrich August Heinrich Kallmann
- Products: Grand pianos, upright pianos
- Owner: Görs & Kallmann families

R. Görs & Kallmann was a piano manufacturer in Berlin, Germany.

The owners Wilhelm Robert Theodor Görs and Friedrich August Heinrich Kallmann were awarded an imperial and royal warrant of appointment to the court of Austria-Hungary.

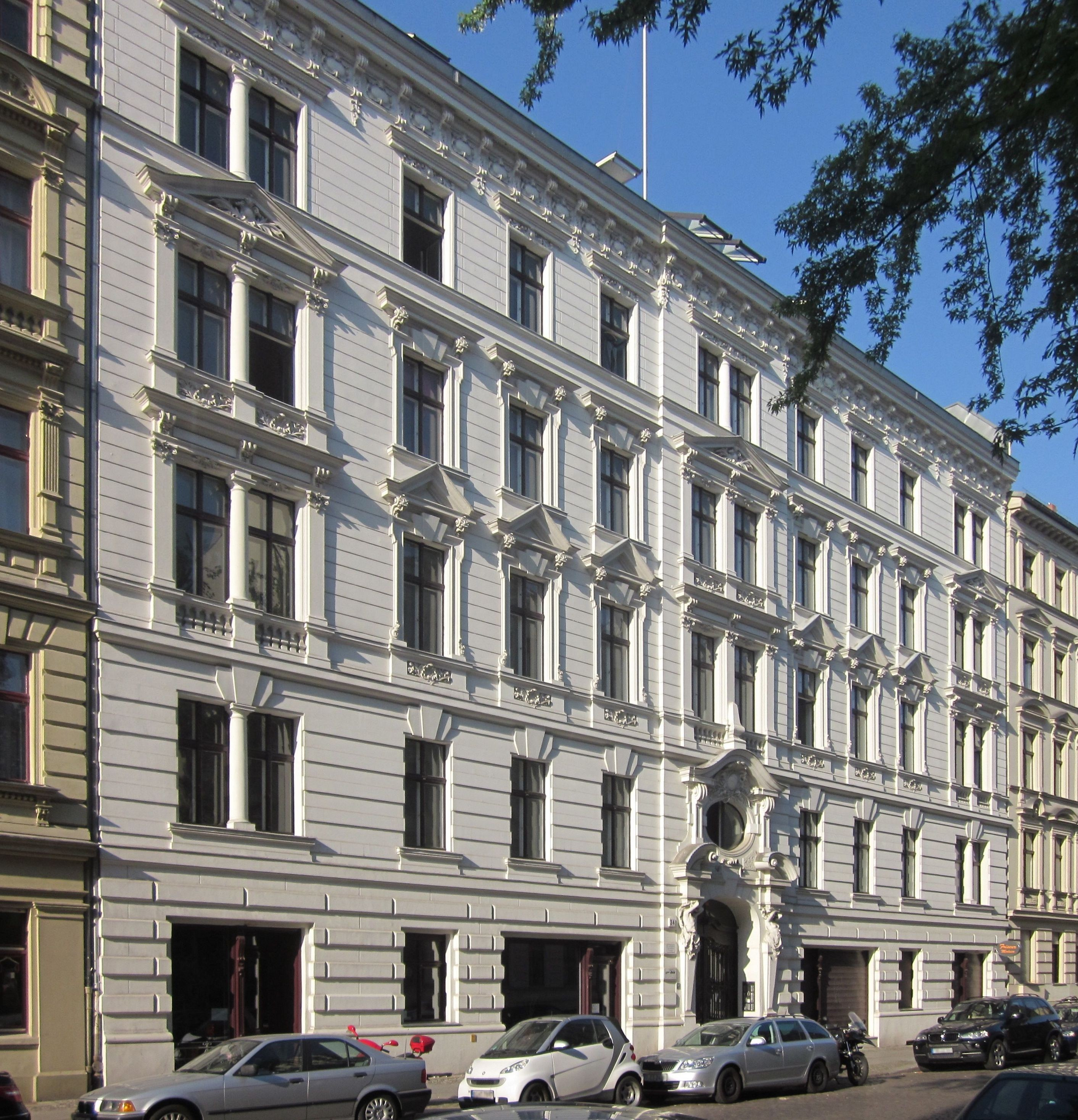
The "White Castle" (*Weißes Schloss*) in Arndtstraße, Kreuzberg

== History ==
Robert Görs (born October 12, 1850, in Berlin; died January 1, 1937, ibid.) founded his company in 1877 at Zossener Straße 10 and joined forces with August Kallmann a few years later in 1880.

August Kallmann (born March 7, 1854, in Wollstein; died April 16, 1926, in Berlin) had completed an apprenticeship in a wine merchant's shop and later worked in a haberdashery before moving to Berlin. There, he found work at the components dealership "Gottschalk Nachfolger." As Gottschalk Nachfolger also sold upright pianos, Kallmann made the acquaintance of Robert Görs. Görs oversaw the technical side of the company, while Kallmann took over the commercial operations. He established business relations in England, Holland, Belgium, Russia, and many other countries, including several in Africa.

In 1885, the company moved to new premises at Hornstraße 11, where up to 150 grand and upright pianos could be built monthly. In the early years, the quality of the instruments was apparently only moderate. At the 1883 Colonial Exhibition in Amsterdam, the two upright pianos exhibited by Görs & Kallmann received little applause for their technical construction. At the Centennial International Exhibition in Melbourne in 1888, there was an apparent dispute over the awards; the judgments on the three uprights and one grand piano presented by Görs & Kallmann were revised several times. Ultimately, they received an honorable mention.

By 1889, more than 200 people were employed at the factory in Berlin's Arndtstraße 34, the "White Castle" built in 1888. The company maintained a piano warehouse at Leipziger Straße 119/120—curiously at the same address as the Trautwein piano factory. In 1892, a patent dispute with the firm J. A. Pfeiffer & Co. was reported in the trade press; while Görs & Kallmann had not registered any patents, Pfeiffer had filed several.
