= Karel Hendrik Geerts =

Belgian sculptor (1807–1855)

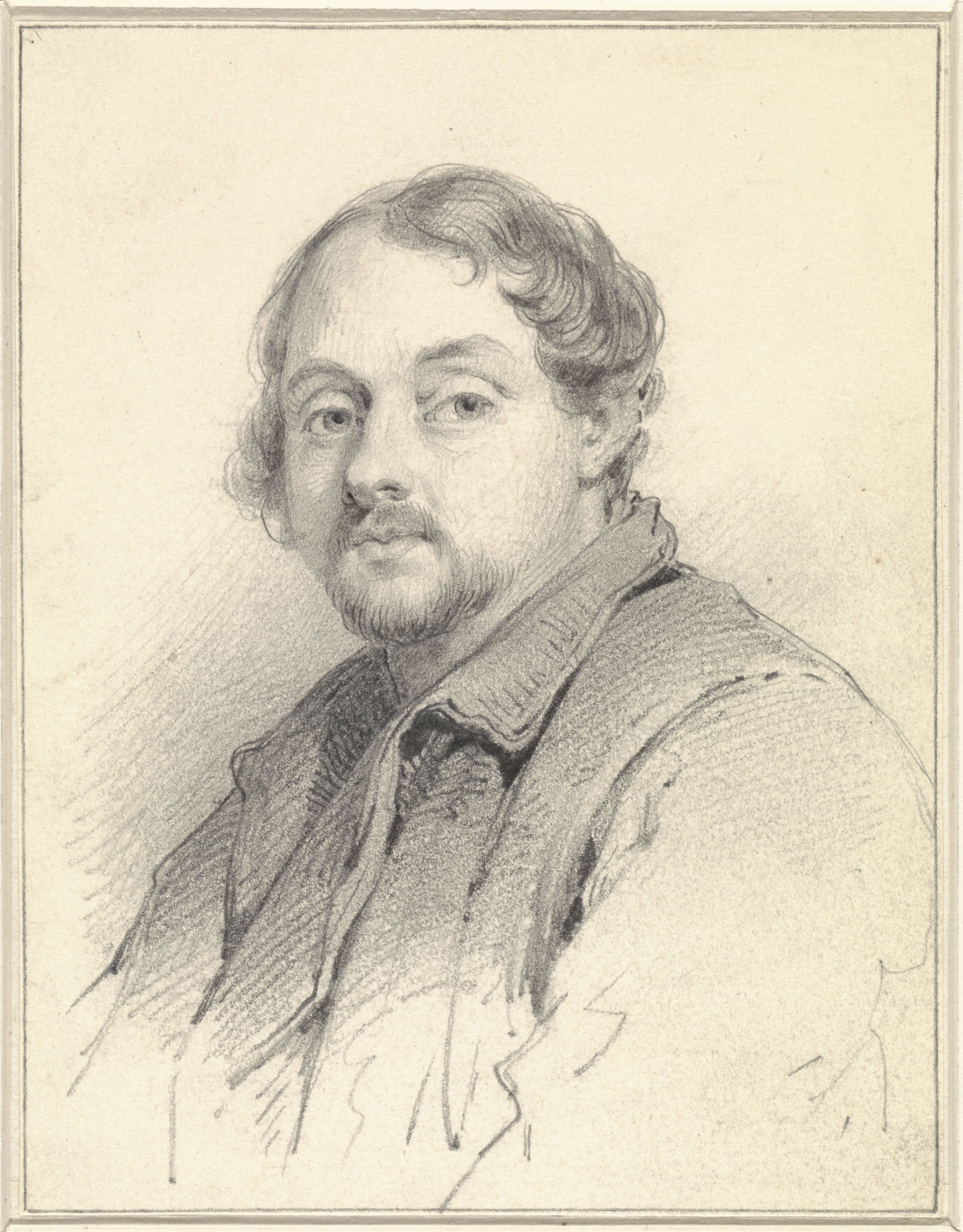
Karel Hendrik Geerts (self-portrait)

Karel Hendrik Geerts (10 August 1807 – 16 June 1855) was a Belgian neo-Gothic sculptor who mainly focused on wood carving.

== Life and work ==
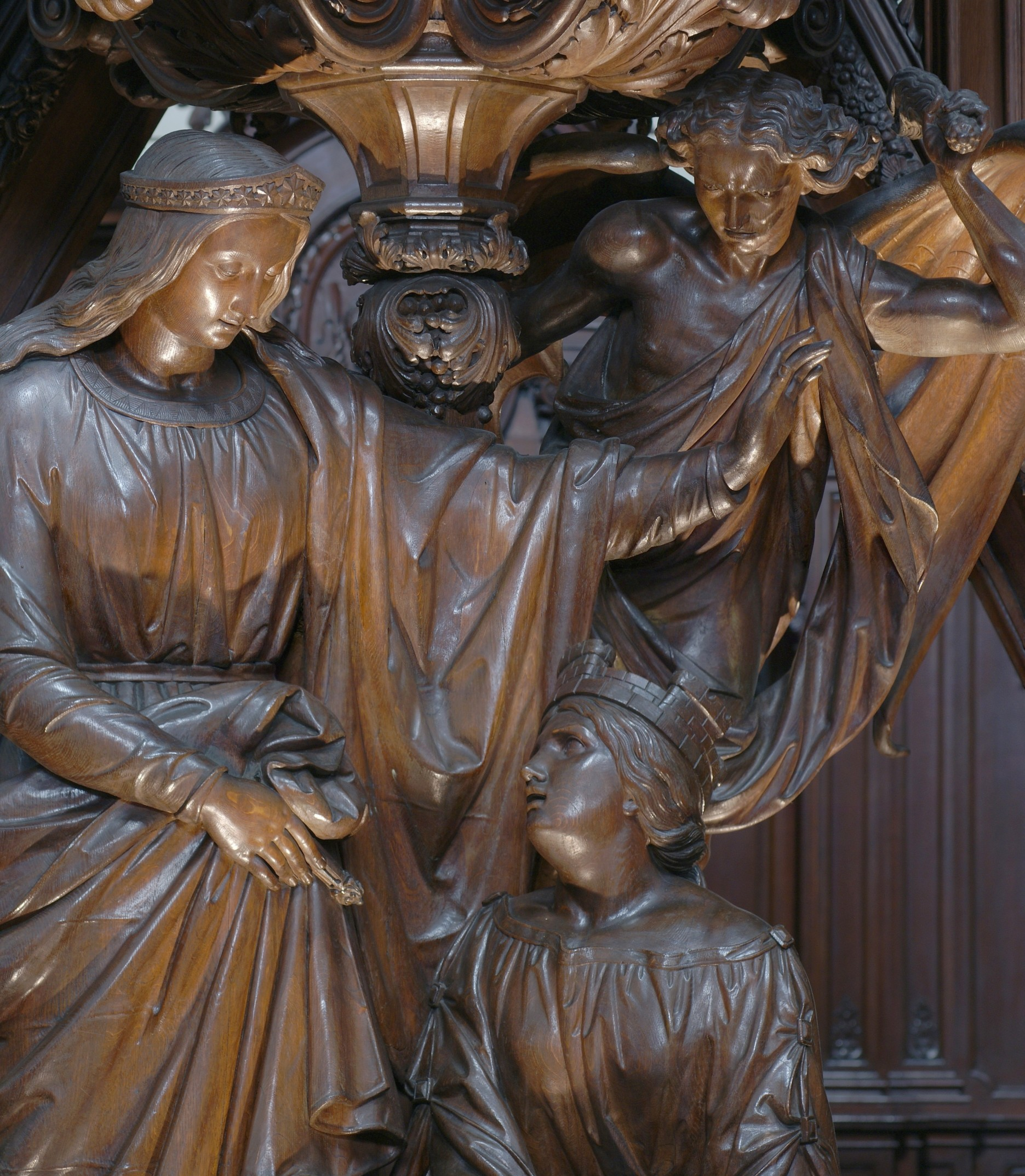
Detail of the pulpit in the St Aubin's Cathedral in Namur, 1848

Karel Geerts was educated at the Academy in Antwerp under the direction of JB Van Hool and Johannes Antonius van der Ven (from 1824 to 1833). He married Ludovica Maria Ruelens. In 1835 he became a teacher at the academy of Leuven and remained so until his death.

From 1842 he carried on activities in a sculpture studio in the Savoyestraat in Leuven. It was there that he developed a school of religious sculpture with about sixty pupils. A few years later, in 1846, he bought a wing of the former Savoy College in the same street, which had been confiscated by the French occupier in 1797. The college chapel had already been demolished (since 1807).

In the year of his death, Geerts had his building in the Savoyestraat enlarged. He had a side building constructed at the back in the direction of the Nieuwstraat, which is nowadays called the Leopold Vanderkelenstraat. After Geerts' death in 1855, his widow sold the premises of the Savoy College in May 1858 to the future mayor of Leuven Leopold Vander Kelen and his wife Maria Mertens.

The buildings were sold for a sum of 30,000 Belgian Francs. In time they were furnished as the Leopold Vander Kelenmuseum.

Because of his work, Geerts was appointed Knight in the Order of the Netherlands Lion and Knight in the Order of Leopold. In Borgerhout (Antwerp) Karel Geertsstraat (near the Turnhoutse Poort) was named after him.

== Gallery ==
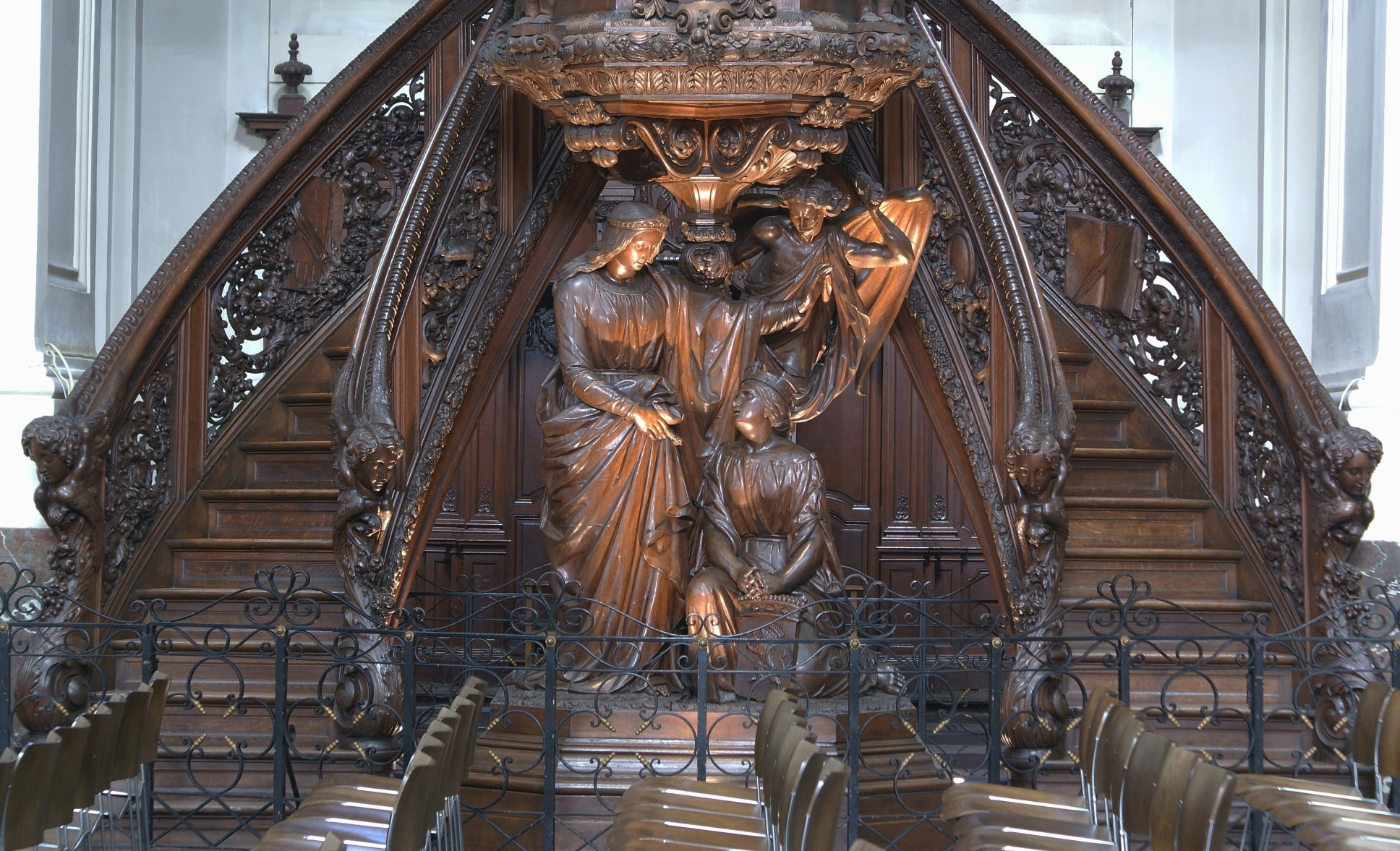
Pulpit of St Aubin's Cathedral in Namur

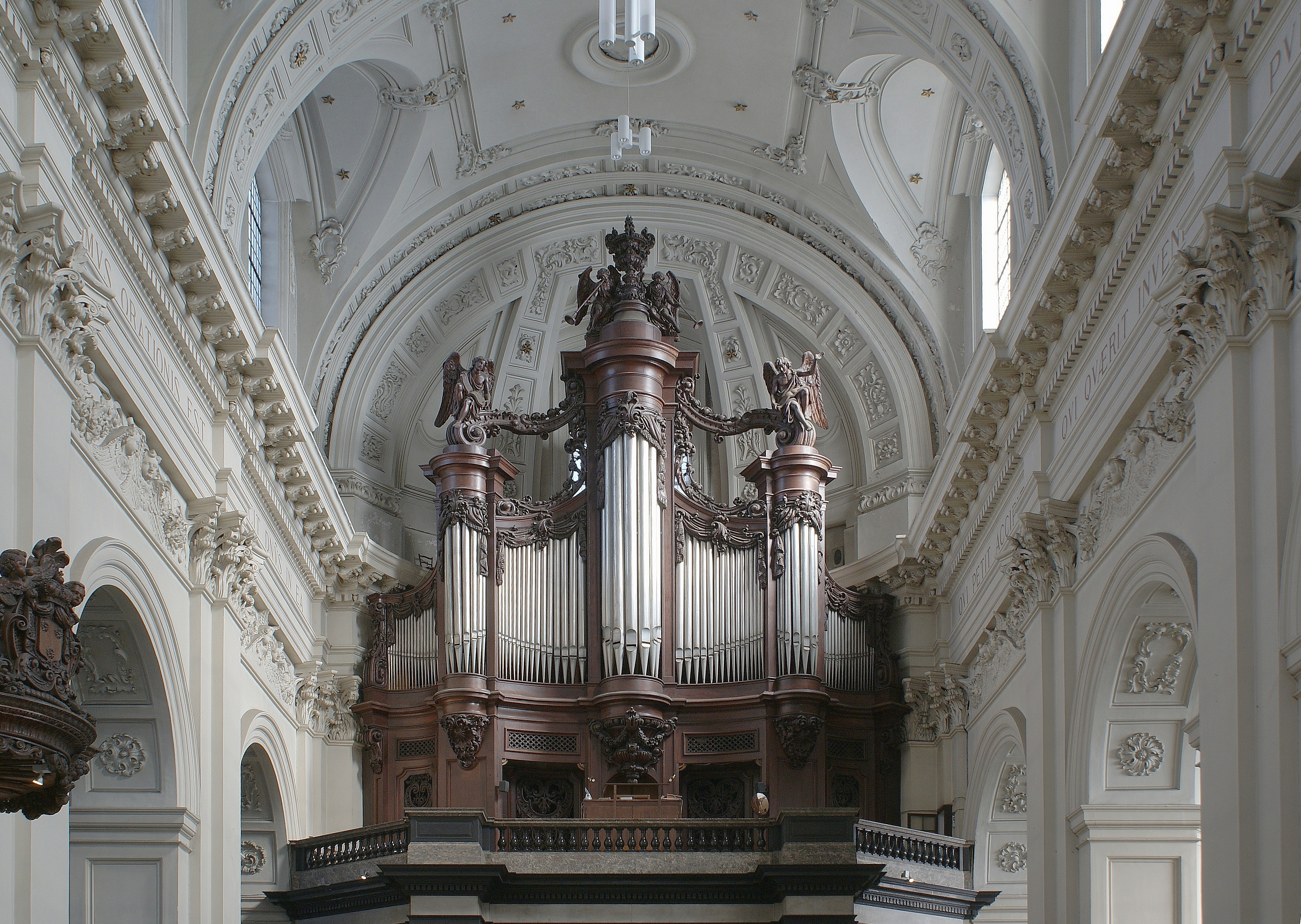
St Aubin's Cathedral in Namur with sculptures by Geerts

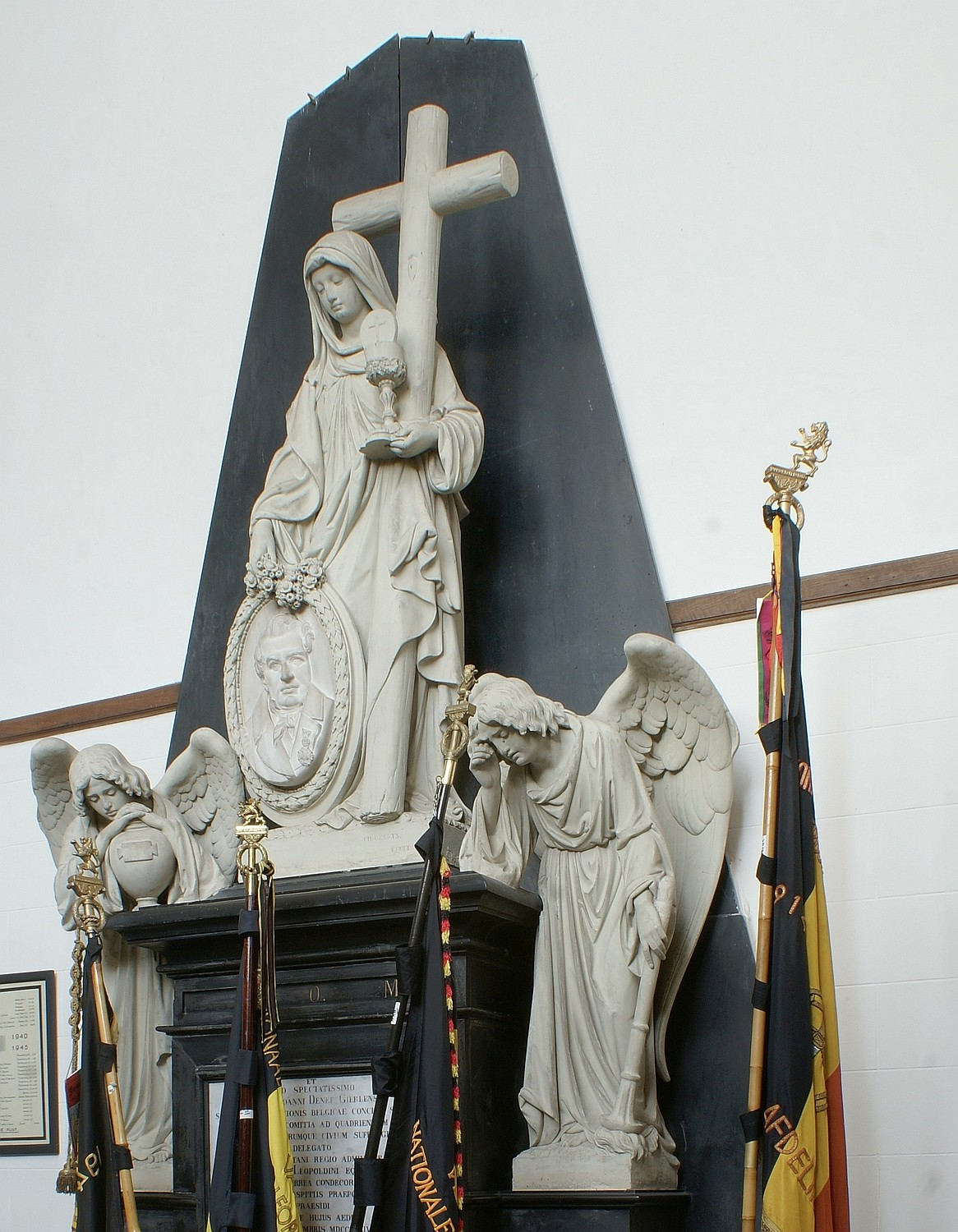
Funerary monument of Petrus Joannes Denef, in the Sint-Pieterskerk in Turnhout

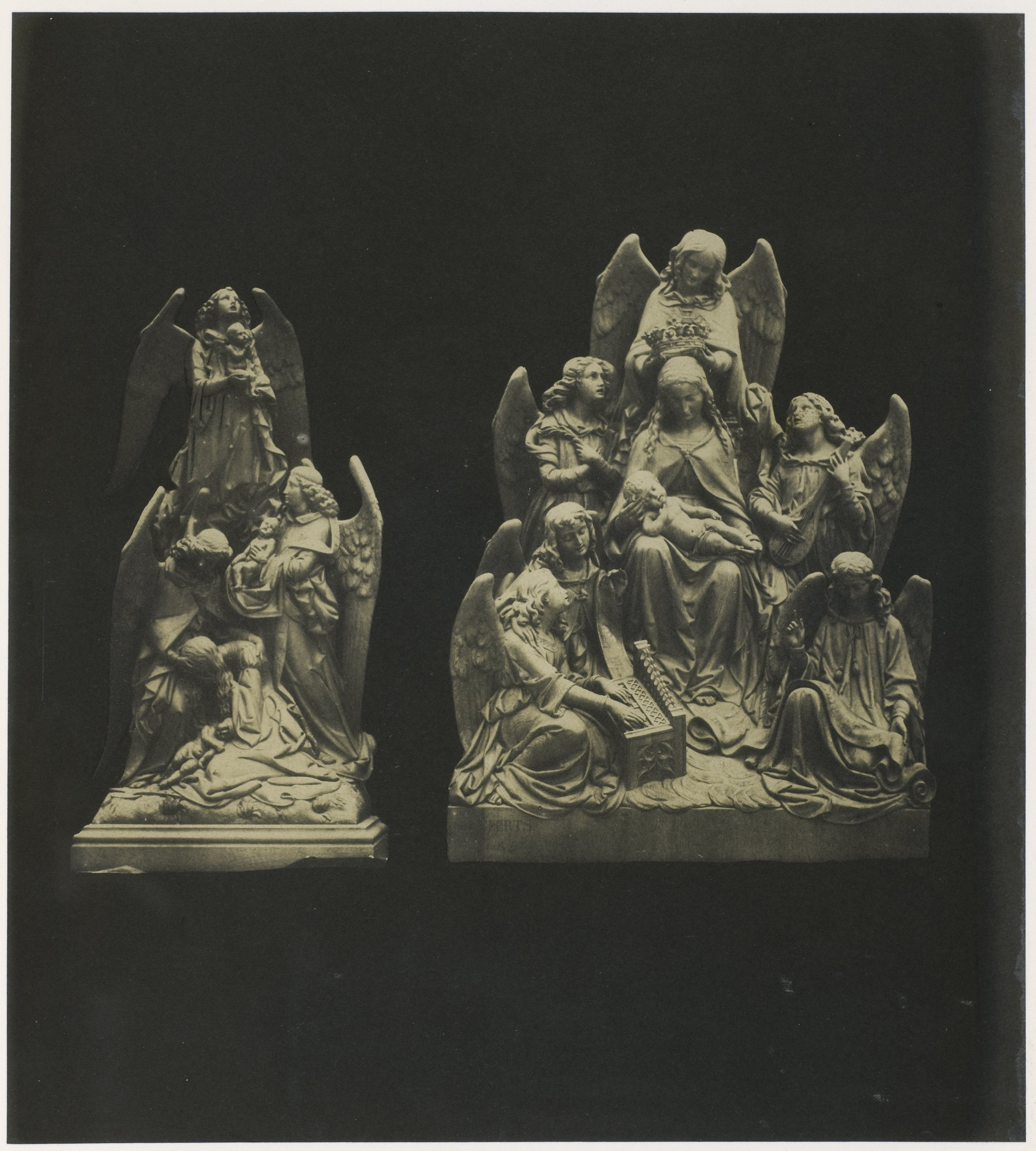
Wooden sculpture of Angels and Mary with the Child
