= Ulrich Görtz =

German mathematician

Ulrich Görtz (1973) is a German mathematician specialising in arithmetic geometry.

== Education and career ==
From 1993 to 1997, Görtz studied mathematics at the University of Münster. He completed his PhD at the University of Cologne in 2000; his advisor was Michael Rapoport. In 2006, Görtz habilitated at the University of Bonn. From 2008 to 2009 he was the recipient of a Heisenberg-Stipendium of the German Research Foundation (DFG). He received the Von-Kaven-Ehrenpreis of the DFG. Since 2009, Görtz has been a professor at the University of Duisburg-Essen.

== Books ==
Together with Torsten Wedhorn, Görtz authored the textbook Algebraic Geometry (Part I: Schemes) in 2010. Since August 2015, Görtz has been a member of the editorial board of the journal Results in Mathematics.

- Görtz, Ulrich; Wedhorn, Torsten (2020). Algebraic geometry. I, Schemes : with examples and exercises. Wiesbaden, Germany. ISBN 978-3-658-30733-2. OCLC 1181995650.

== Personal life ==
Görtz is an Esperantist, and had been active in the youth organisation of the German Esperanto Association.
