= Gers (Schwalm) =

River in Germany

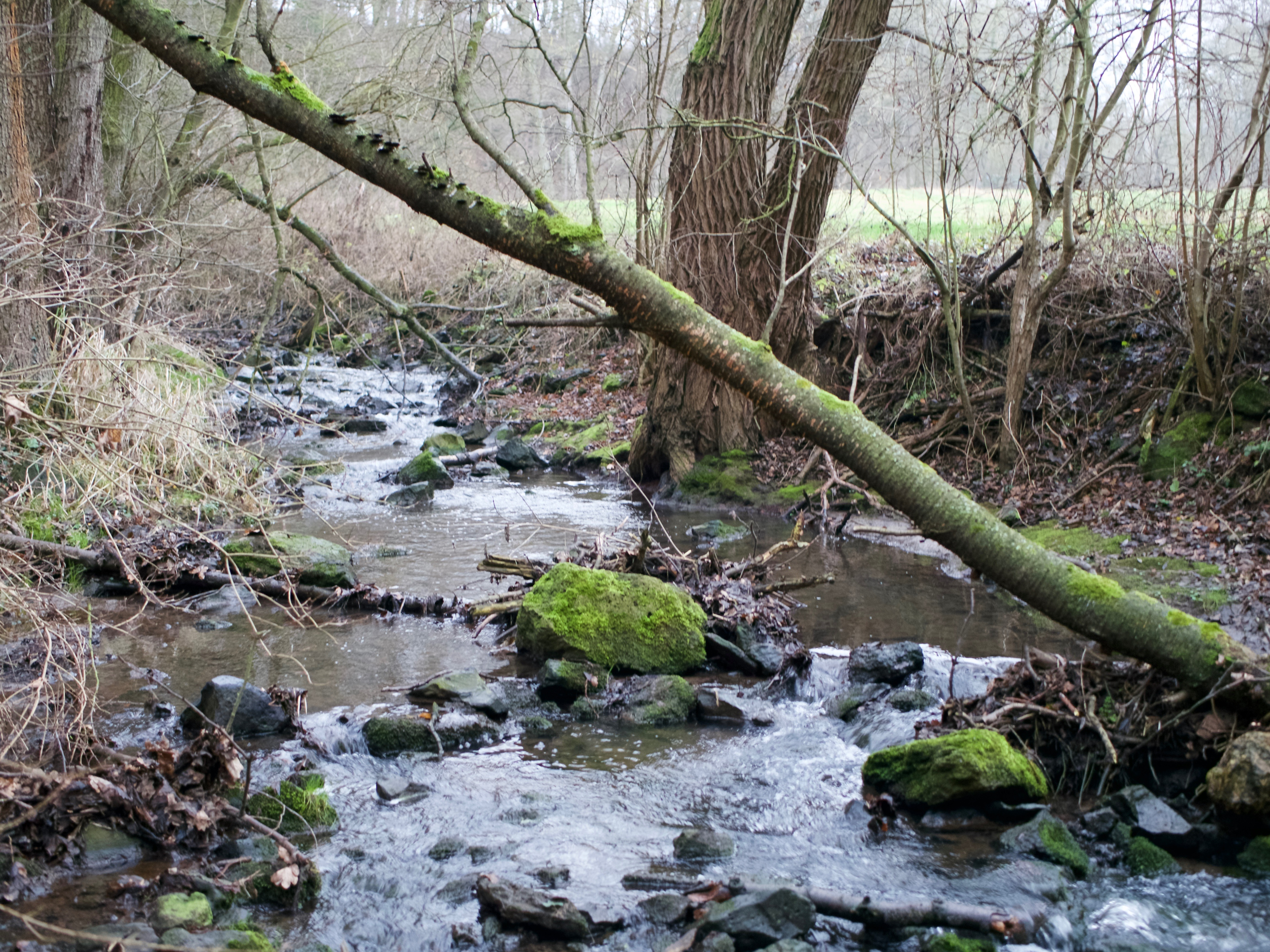

Location
- Country: Germany
- State: Hesse

Physical characteristics
- Mouth
  - location: Schwalm
  - coordinates: 50.9582°N 9.2139°E
- Length: 10.2 km (6.3 mi)

Basin features
- Progression: Schwalm→ Eder→ Fulda→ Weser→ North Sea

Gers is a river of Hesse, Germany. It flows into the Schwalm near Allendorf an der Landsburg.

== See also ==
- List of rivers of Hesse
