= Gert van Rooyen =

South African serial killer

- Born: Cornelius Gerhardus van Rooyen; 11 April 1938; South Africa
- Died: 15 January 1990 (aged 51); Pretoria, South Africa
- Cause of death: Suicide
- Occupation: Builder

Details
- Country: South Africa
- Killed: 6

Cornelius Gerhardus van Rooyen (11 April 1938 – 15 January 1990), better known as Gert van Rooyen, was a South African paedophile and serial killer who abducted, sexually assaulted, and murdered at least six young girls between 1988 and 1989. He was aided in his crimes by his mistress Joey Haarhoff. In early 1990, when faced with arrest after the escape of their latest kidnap victim, Van Rooyen killed Haarhoff and himself in a murder-suicide. Despite later evidence against them, the two were never formally convicted due to their deaths and the bodies of their alleged victims were never found.

== Biography ==
Cornelius Gerhardus van Rooyen, commonly known by the nicknames "Gert" and "Bokkie", was born in South Africa on 11 April 1938. He is assumed to have been the sole killer, although neither the South African Police nor its post-apartheid successor organisation, the South African Police Service, have conducted full and conclusive investigations since his suicide. It is commonly believed that Van Rooyen was part of a paedophile group, although this has not been fully investigated.

Various reports as to the whereabouts of his victims have not been investigated, leaving their families unable to put them to rest.

== Criminal history ==
Gert Van Rooyen's first crimes were various thefts. He was sent to a reform school in 1954, after stealing a car which he drove from Cape Town to Pretoria to visit his dying mother. In 1960, he was convicted of stealing motor spares and clothing. Van Rooyen married and subsequently fathered six children: Anne Marie, Judith, Hannes, Flippie, Gerhard and Adriaan, and earned a legitimate living running a building construction business together with his brothers.

In 1979, Van Rooyen abducted two girls, aged 10 and 13, taking them to the Hartbeespoort Dam near Pretoria, where he punched them in the face, ordered them to remove their clothing and sexually molested them. Van Rooyen released the girls in Pretoria the following day, and was subsequently arrested and sentenced to four years imprisonment for the abduction, sexual assault and common assault of the girls, serving three years before being released.

In August 1983, he and his wife Aletta divorced. In 1988, Van Rooyen started dating divorcee Francina Johanna ("Joey") Hermina Haarhoff, who became his alleged accomplice, and the couple holidayed together at Warmbaths and Umdloti, on the KwaZulu Natal coast. It is commonly believed that some of their victims may be buried on the beaches in KZN, as the time of the abductions corresponds to known vacation periods.

== Possible victims ==
Van Rooyen is thought to have used Haarhoff to lure young girls for him. Children's homes reported that she telephoned requesting to bring girls home for the holidays and weekends. The couple applied to foster children, but the application was turned down. At the end of 1989, a 14-year-old girl from an orphanage in the Orange Free State spent the Christmas holidays with the couple.

- On 1 August 1988, 14-year-old Tracy-Lee Scott-Crossley of Randburg near Johannesburg disappeared. She was seen by witnesses climbing into a Volkswagen Beetle outside of the shopping mall in Cresta. A nationwide police search and hypermarket poster campaign were launched. Her brother Mark, who had declined an offer to go shopping with her, was severely guilt-ridden and traumatised by her disappearance. In later life he was found guilty of the murder of a farm worker, beating him and throwing his unconscious body to the lions.
- On 22 December 1988, 12-year-old Fiona Harvey of Pietermaritzburg disappeared. A white Ford Bantam pick-up truck used in her abduction with an advertisement for Van Rooyen's building-contracting business on it would later link him to this crime.
- On 7 June 1989, 12-year-old Joan Horn of Pretoria disappeared.
- In July 1989, 16-year-old Janet Delport of Durban disappeared after being abducted in a shopping mall by a blonde woman. She was later found wandering around distressed, but unharmed.
- Some weeks later, 9-year-old Rosa Piel of Alberton disappeared.
- On 22 September 1989, 11-year-old Odette Boucher and 12-year-old Anne-Mari Wapenaar, both of Kempton Park, disappeared.
- On 29 September 1989, Kobie Wapenaar, Anne-Mari's mother, received a letter from her daughter claiming that she and Odette had run away to Durban with some boys. Odette's letter arrived a week after Anne-Mari's ― although it was posted on the same day, 23 September 1989, in Durban. It is suspected the letter was written under duress.
- On 3 November 1989, 13-year-old Yolanda Wessels, the niece of Van Rooyen's partner disappeared.
- On 11 January 1990, 16-year-old Joan Booysen of Pretoria was abducted by Haarhoff in Church Square, Pretoria, and was taken to Van Rooyen's home on Malherbe Street, in the Capital Park neighbourhood of the city.(25°43′43.5″S 28°11′24″E) Booysen was handcuffed, drugged and sexually assaulted before being locked in a cupboard. It is likely that Van Rooyen and Haarhoff thought that Booysen was younger than she was due to her small stature. She managed to escape and alert the police who placed the home under surveillance and four days later identified Van Rooyen when he drove past his house in a white Ford pick-up that matched the description of a vehicle used in one of the abductions. Upon discovering Booysen's disappearance, Van Rooyen shot and killed Haarhoff with a .22 revolver before committing suicide with a .357 revolver.

All the above disappearances, with the exception of Rosa Piel, were linked by witness statements or forensic evidence to Van Rooyen and Haarhoff following their deaths. For example, Odette Boucher's home address and phone number were found written on a piece of paper and hidden under a carpet in the garage, as well as her class captain's badge and yellow bag. Anne-Mari Wapenaar's address and home keys, as well as the envelopes and paper used when writing to their parents were found in his home. None of Van Rooyen's victims were ever found, despite extensive police searches of his business premises and house, which was dubbed "The House of Horrors" by the press.

In 1996, Absa Bank donated Van Rooyen's former house to the police to allow the girls' disappearance to be investigated further. On 13 May 1996, police systematically demolished the house in a search for new forensic evidence that might provide clues to the fate of the missing girls. The roof was removed and vacuumed for traces of human hair and nails, then the walls were demolished and the kitchen and main bedroom were scanned with sonar equipment for cavities. The soil in the garden was sifted and some bones found, but forensic pathologists identified these as non-human.

In February 2001, Flippie Van Rooyen, Gert van Rooyen's son, was found guilty of perjury in the Pretoria Magistrate's Court. He was charged with three counts of perjury after giving police conflicting statements under oath relating to the six missing schoolgirls. Flippie was then already in jail for a death sentence which had been commuted to life imprisonment, for the murder of a 15-year-old Zimbabwean girl. He was paroled in 2008. Another son, Gerhard, was sentenced to 15 years in prison for theft and fraud.

In June 1990, a customer at the Fabric Library in Midrand found a pencilled note, written in a childish hand, on a slip. It read: "I am Anne-Mari. My friend and I are with our kidnappers at (listed an address). My friend has tried to phone, but was cut off."

Interviewed by the Sunday Star in April 1993, when news of the letter came to light, former Fabric Library personal assistant Debora Sloane said: "What riveted me was a little girl who came into the Fabric Library shortly before the note was discovered. This girl of about twelve had short black hair and appeared very scared. I can still see her sitting there and wondered at the time why she was looking so scared."

Contacted this week, Kobie Wapenaar told the Saturday Star that "the handwriting was definitely Anne-Mari's - and police handwriting experts confirmed it."

Although Ray Boucher said police investigations at the address given in Anne-Mari's note proved fruitless, it remains the only positive proof that she and Odette were perhaps alive months after the paedophile couple's bodies were cremated.

On 12 March 2007, renewed interest in the case occurred after a set of adolescent bones was found on the beach near Umdloti, Kwazulu-Natal about 500m away from a holiday resort that Van Rooyen and Haarhoff are known to have visited. Subsequent DNA testing did not identify any of the Van Rooyen victims. The South African Police have not released further details, which would lead one to believe there was no positive identification made.

Significant public attention has been brought to bear on the case by the investigative television series Carte Blanche which dedicated an episode to the mystery.

In November 2007, bones were discovered in a property adjacent to Van Rooyen's house in Pretoria whilst the ground was being dug up to install a swimming pool. Local authorities were alerted and police forensic experts were to determine if the bones were human.

== See also ==
- List of serial killers in South Africa
