= Gert-Arne Nilsson =

Swedish footballer

Personal information
- Full name: Gert-Arne Nilsson
- Date of birth: 31 October 1941 (age 85)
- Position: Defender

Senior career*
Years	Team	Apps	(Gls)
1960–1967	Malmö FF	64	(0)
1969–1970	Helsingborgs IF		
- * Club domestic league appearances and goals

Gert-Arne Nilsson (born 31 October 1941) is a Swedish former footballer who played as a defender.
