= Govert =

Govert is a Dutch masculine given name. It is a form of the name Godfried. Other forms include Govaart and Govaert. People with this name include:

- Govert-Marinus Augustijn (1871–1963), Dutch potter in the style of the Art Nouveau
- Govert Bidloo (1649–1713), Dutch physician, anatomist, poet and playwright
- Govert Boyen (born 1977), Belgian football goalkeeper
- Govert Brasser (born 1956), Dutch competitive sailor
- Nicolaas Govert de Bruijn (1918–2012), Dutch mathematician
- Govert Dircksz Camphuysen (1624–1672), Dutch animal and genre painter
- Govert Flinck (1615–1660), Dutch painter
- Govert Huijser (1931–2014), Dutch Army general
- Govert Klinkhamer (1702–1774), Dutch poet and silk merchant
- Govert van der Leeuw (1645–1688), Dutch landscape painter
- Govert Schilling (born 1956), Dutch astronomer and popular-science writer
- Govert Schüller (born 1959), Dutch-American author
- Govert Viergever (born 1989), Dutch rower
- Govaert Wendelen (1580–1667), Flemish astronomer

== See also ==
- Asteroid 10986 Govert, named after Govert Schilling
- Jacqueline Govaert (born 1982), Dutch singer, songwriter, and pianist
