= Lac de Gers =

Lake in France

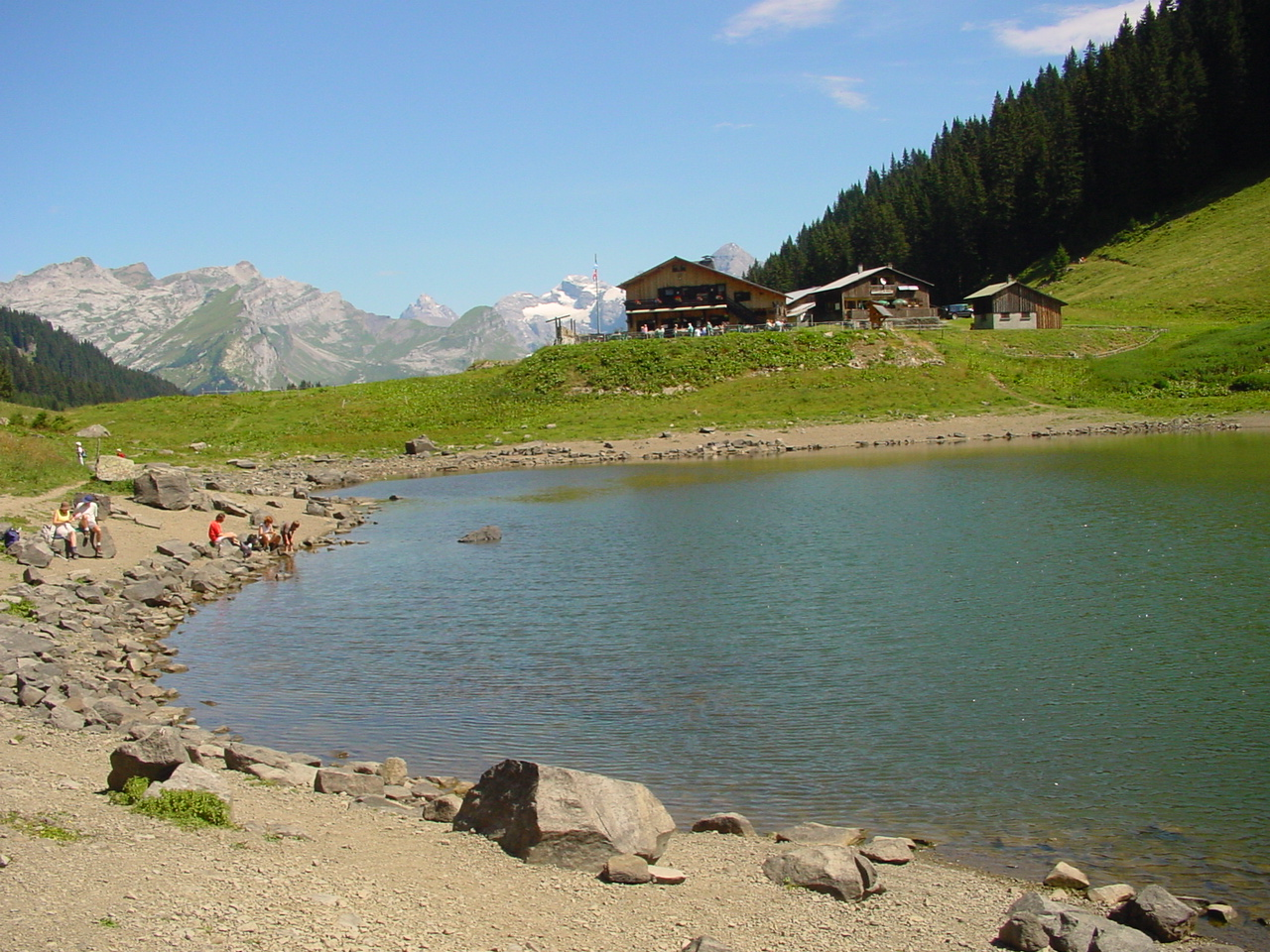
- The Lake in view

- Location within France
- Location: Haute-Savoie
- Coordinates: 46°1′36″N 6°43′45″E
- Basin countries: France
- Surface area: 6.4 ha (16 acres) (max)
- Surface elevation: 1,537 m (5,043 ft)

Lac de Gers is a lake above Samoëns in Haute-Savoie, France. The lake's water level varies seasonally up by 2 m. Its maximum surface area is 6.5 ha.
