= Ger Maycock =

Ger Mayock (8 December 1970 – 7 May 2006) was an Irish artist.

Mayock was a native of Ross West near Castlebar, County Mayo, moving to Dublin 1988 to study Film at Dún Laoghaire College of Art and Design. He graduated in 1993 and in that year directed a film entitled ‘War’, which was subsequently screened in Ireland and at film festivals in Europe. Mayock lived and worked in New York City, Paris and Prague before returning to Ireland in 1996.

In 2002 he settled in County Leitrim to study at the Sculpture Centre in Manorhamilton, working on wood, stone and bronze. In 2003, Mayock collaborated on a biodiversity project for Kew Gardens, London, creating a sculpture which became part of the garden; it stretched eleven metres long, three metres high.

A granite sculpture he finished in 2004 is now a permanent feature of the grounds of Farmleigh House, County Dublin.

Mayock's last sculpture, entitled "Godhead", was commissioned for the prayer room at Ireland West Airport, County Mayo. It was completed just days prior to his death. Mayock died in a single-vehicle road traffic accident in May 2006.

Meadowsweet – A Retrospective: Celebrating the Artist Ger Mayock, ran in the Linenhall Arts Centre, Castlebar, from 11 June to 3 July 2010.
