= Neville Gertze =

Namibian diplomat

Neville Melvin Gertze (born August 5, 1966, in Windhoek ) is a Namibian diplomat who was, among other things, has served as Ambassador of the Republic of Namibia to Germany and has been permanent representative and ambassador to the United Nations in New York City since 2017.

In 1990 he was the first advisor for Asia and the Pacific, and then between 1991 and 1995, First Secretary at the Embassy in the United States. [2] Upon his return, he was from 1995 to 1997 Personal assistant to Foreign Minister Theo-Ben Gurirab, and subsequently, between 1997 and 2003, Counselor and head of the commercial department at the embassy in South Africa.

He then acted as High Commissioner in Malaysia from 2003 to 2008, based in Kuala Lumpur, and was also accredited as Ambassador to the Philippines and Thailand. On 13 January 2009, he was ambassador to Germany and remained there until 2015. Since May 29, 2009, he was also ambassador to the Holy See and ambassador to Poland and Turkey accredited. On his return, he was Chief of Protocol at the Ministry of International Relations and Cooperation between 2015 and 2017.

In 2017 he was appointed Permanent Representative and Ambassador to the United Nations in New York City and presented his letter of accreditation to UN Secretary-General António Guterres on January 9, 2017.

On 23 May 2025, Ambassador Neville Gertze was appointed as the Executive Director of the President of Namibia's Private Office.

Gertze is married and has two children.
