= William L. Gertz =

American CEO (born 1952)

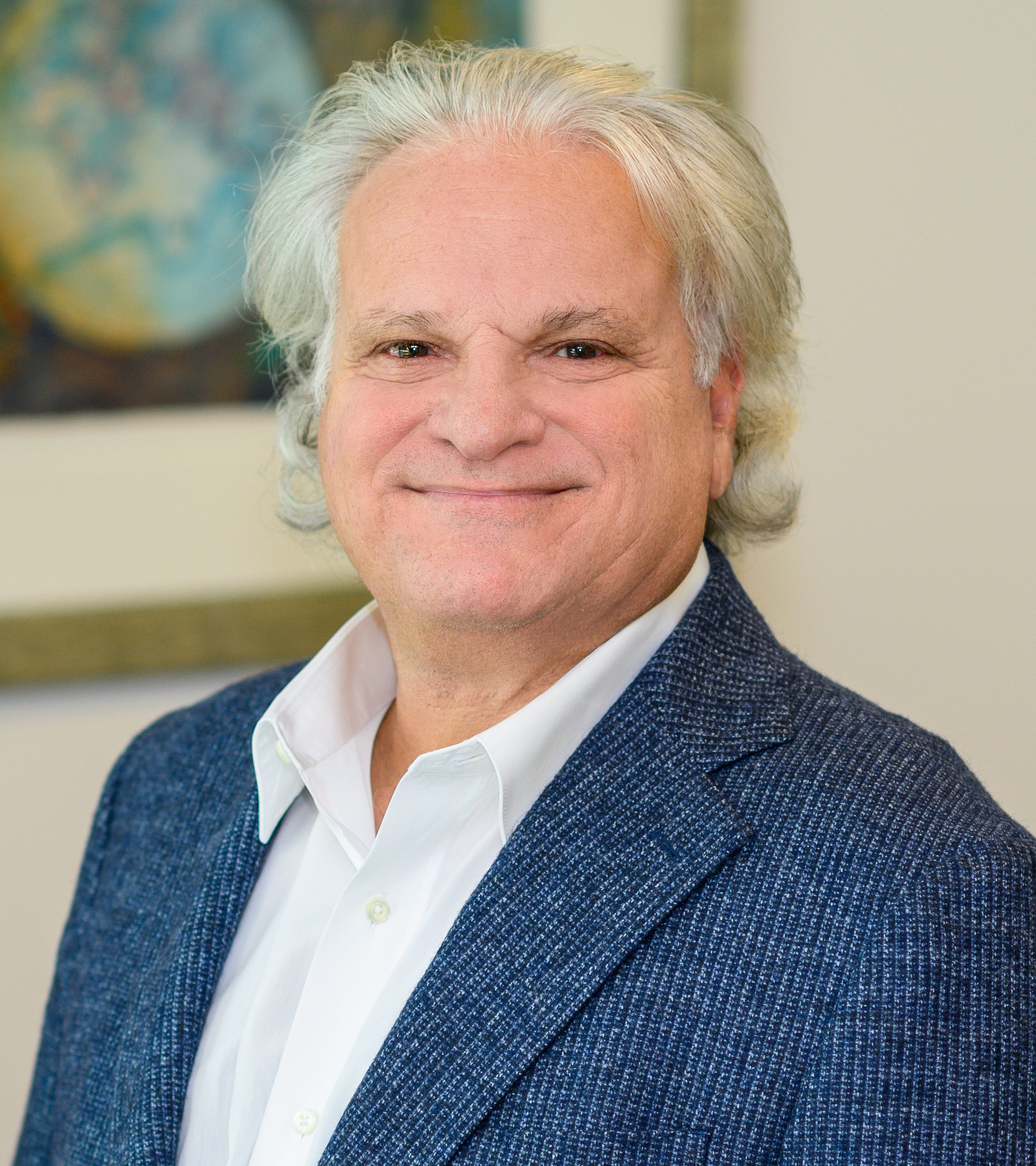
Bill Gertz

William L. Gertz (born October 10, 1952) is the Chairman, President and CEO of the American Institute For Foreign Study (AIFS), a cultural exchange and educational travel company with 10 global locations, headquartered in Stamford, CT.

== Education and early years ==
After backpacking through Europe with his friends in the summer of 1973, Gertz moved to France where he experienced the European lifestyle. Once he returned to the United States in 1976, he entered the field of International Education and became marketing manager for the Council on International Educational Exchange (CIEE). He later founded a marketing and public relations organization, which served a diverse roster of clients from artist Peter Max and numerous youth and student travel organizations such as British Tourist Authority.

In the early 1980s, Gertz became the Travel Editor for Transitions, an international education publication.

== Career ==
In 1985, Gertz joined The American Institute for Foreign Study as an Associate Marketing Director. In 1986, Gertz helped launch the United States’ first au pair agency, Au Pair in America, as a program of AIFS. Working with the U.S. Department of State, Au Pair in America helped established today's au pair program orientation model.

Gertz became Vice President of AIFS in 1990. In 1993, he created a Customer Relationship Management system for AIFS and launched the company's first website a few years later.

In 1998, Gertz became the Chief Operating Officer of AIFS and in 2005, was named President and CEO. Gertz and AIFS organized the Diversity in International Education forum in Washington, D.C. in 2010, a symposium designed to address the need for more diverse participation.

In February 2018, Gertz was elected Chairman of AIFS after the death of Sir Cyril Taylor. Later in 2018, AIFS Study Abroad was named the top-rated study abroad organization and program by GoAbroad.com based on 35,000 student reviews.

In 2019, Gertz was awarded a Centennial Medal from the Institute of International Education (IIE), in recognition of his outstanding contributions to international education.

When the study abroad industry was facing challenges during the COVID-19 pandemic, Gertz was a vocal advocate for the return of the U.S. study abroad sector.

In 2025, Gertz marked 40 years with AIFS and reflected on his career in an interview with PIE News, published on June 11, discussing the challenges and transformations in the study abroad sector over the past four decades.

== Published works ==
In 2015, Gertz co-authored, A Parent’s Guide to Study Abroad, published in both English and Spanish, which offers information for parents as they navigate the study abroad experience.

In 2024, Gertz co-authored “A Family Guide to Study Abroad”, published by IIE.

In 2024, Gertz released “Broken Dreams,” a collection of poems and stories that delve into deep emotions and tough realities.

Gertz has penned articles for educational publications including the IIE Networker Magazine and Youth Travel International.

In 2026, Gertz released "Land of Forgotten Fish", a collection of his beat poetry from the 1970s and 80s, as well as new poems exploring reflections and commentary on everyday life.
