= Geare =

Geare is a surname. Notable people with the surname include:

- Michael Geare (1565–?), English sailor, privateer and merchant
- Reginald Geare (1889–1927), American architect

== See also ==
- Gear (name)
- Weare (surname)
