= Gert Louis Lamartine =

German painter

Gert Louis Lamartine (20 July 1898 in Uiffingen – 9 January 1966 in Stuttgart) was a German painter, sculptor and interior designer.

== Biography ==
Gert Louis Lamartine, born under the name Gerhard Ludwig Gustav Lamerdin, was the son of Gustav Lamerdin and Bertha née Müller, and related to Alphonse de Lamartine. He studied painting at the University of Heidelberg and at the Academy of Fine Arts, Karlsruhe.

In 1923 he emigrated to Canada and set up an interior decoration studio in the Saint Helen's Island in Montreal. He worked for more than forty years from that studio. He and his team decorated numerous houses in the Montreal area. They also decorated famous hotels like the Château Frontenac in Quebec City, the Château Laurier in Ottawa, the Château Lake Louise in Banff, Alberta and the Queen Elizabeth Hotel in Montreal.

Most of his paintings were impressionistic and abstract. He also painted portraits, figure studies, capes and still lifes. He selected his subjects from countries that he has travelled to (e.g. Japan, China, Caribbean, Portugal, Spain and others). His art was exhibited in various places, including the Montreal Museum of Fine Arts in 1959 and the Toit de Chaume gallery in Piedmont, Quebec outside Montreal in 1964. He also made mosaics and sculptures.
