= Raymond Goertz =

American roboticist (1915-1972)

Raymond C. Goertz
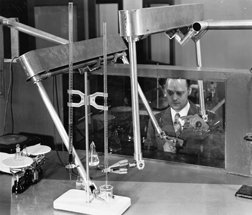
- Goertz demonstrating his mechanical slave-master manipulator device in 1949
- Born: Raymond C. Goertz; March 12, 1915; Clearwater, Kansas, U.S.
- Died: June 4, 1970 (aged 55); Downers Grove, Illinois
- Education: Montana State University; Polytechnic Institute of Brooklyn; Illinois Institute of Technology
- Known for: teleoperators
- Spouse: Helen Boula
- Children: 3
- Awards: Ray Goertz Award; The Franklin Institute Edward Longstreth medal
- Scientific career
- Fields: Telerobotics
- Workplaces: Argonne National Laboratory

Raymond C. Goertz (March 12, 1915 – June 4, 1970) was an American mechanical engineer and an early pioneer in the field of robotics, specifically remote-controlled robots (see telepresence). In 1949, while working for the Atomic Energy Commission at Argonne National Laboratory, Goertz filed a patent for an early master-slave manipulator (U.S. patent 2,632,574) in order to handle radioactive material. Goertz recognized the value of electrically coupling manipulators and laid the foundations of modern tele-robotics and bilateral force-reflecting positional servomechanisms.

Goertz also performed early research on the degrees of freedom necessary for smooth motion by remote manipulation and developed one of the first head-mounted displays as a prototype for virtual reality. Nautical terms such as pitch, yaw, and roll were incorporated into the lexicon of robotics by Goertz.

Today, the purpose of teleoperation has expanded beyond the scope of nuclear safety and now includes uses such as reaching remote environments in space or in surgical operations, among other uses.

In 1985 the American Nuclear Society established the 'Ray Goertz Award' to recognize and honor members who have made outstanding contributions to the field of remote technology.

== Education and early life ==
Raymond C. Goertz was born in Clearwater, Kansas on March 12, 1915. He was the son of Norma E. and Flora (Saint) Goertz and had a sister, Mrs. Thelma Main and two brothers, Lynn Goertz and Lee Noble. Goertz received his Bachelor of Science degree from Montana State College in 1940, graduating with honors. He then began his graduate studies at the Polytechnic Institute of Brooklyn in 1942, staying there until 1946. In 1947 Goertz moved to Illinois and completed his graduate studies at the Illinois Institute of Technology from 1947 to 1949.

== Career and research ==
Raymond Goertz worked for the Sperry Gyroscope Company at the Servomechanisms Laboratory as a project engineer from 1940 to 1947 while also working on his graduate studies at the Polytechnic Institute of Brooklyn. In 1947 Goertz moved to Illinois to begin work at Argonne National Laboratory as a mechanical engineer, meanwhile completing his graduate studies at the Illinois Institute of Technology through 1949. Goertz later became a senior engineer at Argonne National Laboratory in the remote control engineering division.

At the first and second International Conferences on Peaceful Uses of Atomic Energy in 1955 and 1958 Goertz represented the United States as a delegate.

During his career Goertz was a member of the American Nuclear Society, the American Institute of Chemical Engineers, and the Institute of Electrical and Electronics Engineers.

Goertz's primary work and accomplishments revolved around the development and improvement of master-slave manipulator devices, but Goertz also devoted time to completing basic research on the degrees of freedom necessary for smooth motion by remote manipulation. He also created an initial prototype of a virtual reality device by developing one of the first head-mounted displays.

For his work Goertz also codified terms so that university and industrial developers could replicate and contribute to his field, and he incorporated nautical terms into the lexicon of robotics, including pitch, yaw, and roll.

The company of Central Research Labs in Red-Wing, Minnesota was created by Goertz's efforts and technological developments, and the company made more than 8,000 master-slave manipulators for entities in 26 different countries. Goertz was replaced in 1953 as head of Central Research Labs by Demetrius Jelatis.

Today, the purpose of teleoperation has expanded beyond the scope of just safety and now includes uses such as reaching remote environments in space or deep underwater and working with manipulating extremely large or small objects for surgical operations or manufacturing, among many other uses.

=== Master-slave manipulator device ===
The goal of a master-slave manipulator is the protection of workers from radiation while enabling precise manipulation of materials. The machine can be thought of as two distinct devices, the "slave" and "master" arms. The "slave" arm is responsive to the controlling device, the "master" arm, with the benefit that through remote handling manual tasks can be performed without the need of direct human intervention. In nuclear settings the slave arm is located within a hot-cell and the master arm is located in a control room. Whenever the master arm is manipulated, the motion is reproduced precisely by the slave arm.

While at Argonne National Laboratory Goertz developed the master-slave manipulator in order to safely handle hazardous material from the 100-B plutonium reactor at Hanford. The initial master-slave manipulator device was designed by Goertz in 1948 as a seven-degree-of-freedom bilateral (symmetrical) metal tape transmission pantograph device, which was operated through a leaded glass wall. In 1949 Goertz filed a patent for a mechanical, bilateral master-slave manipulator, and in 1951 Goertz improved upon this design with the first tel-operated articulated arm with a design that relied on mechanical coupling between the master and slave arms through the utilization of steel pulleys and cables. This was a major milestone in force feedback technology and derivatives of this design are still seen today.

Goertz gradually became aware of the necessity of haptic senses for manipulating delicate objects and used force-feedback systems to improve the deftness of the human-machine combination. Through incorporating the principles of cybernetics Goertz was able to also construct the first electrical master-slave manipulator system, and by 1954 a modified version of the master-slave manipulator (CRL Model 8) began commercial production.

In order to create accurate master-slave manipulator devices, it was necessary for Goertz to develop several principles, all of which are applicable to our own contemporary robotic surgical systems. The principles are as follows. The motion of the slave arm must possess six independent degrees of freedom, three of translation and three of rotation to position gripping devices, and a tong squeeze motion to grip items. The motion of the slave arm must be coupled to the master arms that the position and the direction of the two arms correspond to. The coupling of the two arms must be bilateral and this means that forces at the slave end must be reflected at the master end and displacements produced at the slave end must be able to produce a displacement at the master end, with the slave arm being able to align itself in response to the constraints imposed by the task being done.

=== Awards ===
Goertz was the recipient of the Edward Longstreth medal at the Franklin Institute in Philadelphia, Pennsylvania in 1967. He also received the Radiation Industry award from the American Nuclear Society in 1969.

In 1985 the American Nuclear Society established the "Ray Goertz Award" to recognize and honor its members who have made outstanding contributions to the field of remote technology.

== Personal life ==
Goertz married Helen Boula on September 2, 1950, in Cook, Illinois. Together they had three children: Alan, Jean, and Linda. Goertz died on June 4, 1970, at the age of 55 in Downers Grove, Illinois.
