= Charles Geerts (footballer) =

Belgian footballer

- Geerts with Belgium

Personal information
- Full name: Charles Marie Jean Geerts
- Date of birth: 29 October 1930
- Place of birth: Antwerp, Belgium
- Date of death: 31 January 2015 (aged 84)
- Height: 1.84 m (6 ft 0 in)
- Position: Goalkeeper

Senior career*
Years	Team	Apps	(Gls)
1948–1958	Beerschot VAV	212	(0)
1958–1960	Eendracht Aalst	15	(0)
1960–1963	Stade Louvaniste		
1963–1964	RRC Tirlemont		
1964–1967	Vigor Hamme		
Total		227+	(0)

International career
1949	Belgium U19	3	(0)
	Belgium B	9	(0)
1954	Belgium	1	(0)
- * Club domestic league appearances and goals

Charles Marie Jean Geerts (29 October 1930 – 31 January 2015) was a Belgian football player and coach who played as a goalkeeper.

== Career ==
Born in Antwerp, Geerts played club football for Beerschot VAV, Eendracht Aalst, Stade Louvaniste, RRC Tirlemont, and Vigor Hamme.

After playing for the Belgian under=19 team, he earned one cap for Belgium in 1954, and was a squad member at the 1954 FIFA World Cup. He also eared caps for the Belgian B team.

At Vigor Hamme he worked as a player-coach, and he also coached at Belgica Edegem Sport and Beerschot.

He died on 31 January 2015, aged 84.
