= Charles Geerts (businessman) =

Dutch brothel owner (1943–2024)

- Born: Charles Ludovicus Geerts; 1943; Amsterdam, German-occupied Netherlands
- Died: 6 November 2024 (aged 81)
- Other names: Dikke Charles (fat Charles); Amsterdam's Emperor of Sex
- Occupations: Entrepreneur, brothel owner

Charles Ludovicus Geerts (1943 – 6 November 2024) was a Dutch businessman who was at one time one of Amsterdam's largest brothel owners. He was known as Dikke Charles (Fat Charles) and Amsterdam's Emperor of Sex.

== Background ==
Geerts grew up in East Amsterdam and met Hans Knoop at primary school. When he left school he started as a Market trader selling fruit and vegetables. Later he founded a mail-order company in erotic articles. After the sale of this firm in 1993, the money acquired was invested in real estate on the Amsterdam red-Light district.

Geerts died on 6 November 2024, at the age of 81.

== Business career ==
Geerts was the founder of Scala agencies and the owner of many windows in the red-light district in Amsterdam.

In 2001, he successfully sued Het Parool newspaper in the Raad voor de Journalistiek (Journalism Council) after an article by Bart Middelburg on money laundering. In 2004, Zembla broadcast a programme in which he was associated with child pornography. By order of the Raad voor de Journalistiek, the programme had to rectify this claim. Geerts was friends with drug lord Klaas Bruinsma.

On 30 November 2006, all Geerts licenses were withdrawn by the municipality because, according to the national BIBOB agency, he had close ties with the underworld and would use his company for money laundering. Since the ban on brothels was removed from the Penal Code on 1 October 2000, municipalities have issued brothel permits, which gives them the administrative means to control sex establishments.

On 22 June 2007, it was announced that Geerts was negotiating to sell his brothel buildings to the municipality of Amsterdam. At that time he was in conversation with Stadsgoed NV which, with the support of the municipality of Amsterdam, took over the Geerts' property for €25 million.

A preliminary relief judge had previously forbidden the mayor to close Geerts' premises before the objections committee had substantively commented on Geerts' defence. During the sessions of this committee, the advice of the BIBOB bureau, on which the mayor relied, was ambiguous. On that basis, the municipality of Amsterdam decided to buy out Geerts. In 2008 he sold 17 properties for €25 million of which more than half was paid by the municipality.

Before the sale, Geerts controlled over 60 windows in the entertainment blocks. Most of the windows were emptied and curtains hung behind the windows. "Project 1012" was put into force to gentrify the red-light district. Some feared however that it's a cover for speculation on the very coveted property in the tourist hub.

In 2009, Charles Geerts filed a criminal complaint for defamation against Amsterdam alderman Lodewijk Asscher because he had called him a "criminal" and "crimogenic" person during an interview with Penthouse magazine. In the first instance, the complaint was dismissed by the public prosecutor, after which Geerts' lawyer filed a complaint with the Amsterdam Court of Appeal. A second report against Asscher followed in February 2010 because in an interview with De Telegraaf Asscher related Geerts with serious crime.

In a press release, Geerts pointed out that when selling his properties to the municipality of Amsterdam, he had to commit himself not to publicly or privately make offensive remarks to, or about, municipal administrators or officials. Although not formally agreed, on the basis of reciprocity, the municipality should also refrain making from insulting comments about Geerts. Geerts (and his lawyer) was of the opinion that an alderman, based on his position alone, should not make insulting comments to a citizen.

In August 2012, it was announced that Geerts would be active in the red-light district again, and in 2014 Geerts bought a building at Overtoom, with plans for the establishment of a hotel.

== See also ==
- De Wallen
