= Dave Goertz =

Canadian ice hockey defenceman

- Born: March 28, 1965 (age 60) Edmonton, Alberta, Canada
- Height: 5 ft 11 in (180 cm)
- Weight: 210 lb (95 kg; 15 st 0 lb)
- Position: Defenceman
- Shot: Right
- Played for: Pittsburgh Penguins
- NHL draft: 223rd overall, 1983; Pittsburgh Penguins
- Playing career: 1983–1991

David Goertz (born March 28, 1965) is a Canadian former professional ice hockey player who played two games in the National Hockey League for the Pittsburgh Penguins.

Goertz was born in Edmonton, Alberta.

== Career statistics ==
| | | | Regular Season | | | | | Playoffs |
| Season | Team | League | GP | G | A | Pts | PIM | GP | G | A | Pts | PIM |
|---|---|---|---|---|---|---|---|---|---|---|---|---|
| 1981–82 | Regina Pats | WHL | 67 | 5 | 19 | 24 | 181 | 19 | 1 | 2 | 3 | 61 |
| 1982–83 | Regina Pats | WHL | 69 | 4 | 22 | 26 | 132 | 5 | 0 | 2 | 2 | 9 |
| 1983–84 | Prince Albert Raiders | WHL | 60 | 13 | 47 | 60 | 111 | 5 | 2 | 3 | 5 | 0 |
| 1983–84 | Baltimore Skipjacks | AHL | 1 | 0 | 0 | 0 | 2 | 6 | 0 | 0 | 0 | 0 |
| 1984–85 | Prince Albert Raiders | WHL | 48 | 3 | 48 | 51 | 62 | 13 | 4 | 14 | 18 | 29 |
| 1984–85 | Baltimore Skipjacks | AHL | — | — | — | — | — | 2 | 0 | 2 | 2 | 0 |
| 1985–86 | Baltimore Skipjacks | AHL | 74 | 1 | 15 | 16 | 76 | — | — | — | — | — |
| 1986–87 | Baltimore Skipjacks | AHL | 16 | 0 | 3 | 3 | 8 | — | — | — | — | — |
| 1986–87 | Muskegon Lumberjacks | IHL | 44 | 3 | 17 | 20 | 44 | 15 | 0 | 4 | 4 | 14 |
| 1987–88 | Pittsburgh Penguins | NHL | 2 | 0 | 0 | 0 | 2 | — | — | — | — | — |
| 1987–88 | Muskegon Lumberjacks | IHL | 73 | 8 | 36 | 44 | 87 | 6 | 0 | 4 | 4 | 14 |
| 1988–89 | Muskegon Lumberjacks | IHL | 74 | 1 | 32 | 33 | 102 | 14 | 0 | 4 | 4 | 10 |
| 1989–90 | Muskegon Lumberjacks | IHL | 51 | 3 | 18 | 21 | 64 | — | — | — | — | — |
| 1990–91 | Muskegon Lumberjacks | IHL | 30 | 6 | 10 | 16 | 46 | — | — | — | — | — |
| NHL totals | | | 2 | 0 | 0 | 0 | 2 | — | — | — | — | — |
