= Gert Van Mol =

Belgian media entrepreneur (born 1969)

Gert Van Mol (born 1969) is a Belgian media entrepreneur.

Van Mol studied at the Catholic University of Louvain. Van Mol was student leader of 'Appolloon', representing the students of the faculty of biomedical sciences. While studying he founded The Publishing Company, a publishing house, in 1990. Between 1990 and 2000 The Publishing Company published a series of youth magazines and books, such as Teek magazine, PlayStation Magazine, Banco Magazine for the Bank KBC, Igloo and Flamingo Magazine. In 1999 Van Mol published the book "Priester van vuur. Edward Poppe anders bekeken.", authored by priest Luc De Maere.

In 2000 Van Mol published the book 'Johannes XXIII, eenvoudig en nederig, een zalig mens: 16 bevoorrechte getuigen', authored by Gunnar Riebs.

From 2002 till 2011 Van Mol was VIP Program Manager for The Wall Street Journal Europe working out of London. In this capacity he created The Wall Street Journal Future Leadership Institute. Van Mol discovered the CEO of The Wall Street Journal Europe, Andrew Langhoff, was involved in a publication scheme publishing favorable articles for paying advertisers.

In 2011 Van Mol started as CEO of the digital TV-channel Life!TV Broadcasting Company. In his capacity he introduced the first female presenter with a headscarf on Belgian TV. For the same company he developed the erotic channel Club 41.

After Van Mol left the broadcasting station, he became CEO of Skyview Attractions, an Amsterdam based entertainmentcompany. Under his leadership the company built a ferris wheel on the pier in the sea of Scheveningen, The Netherlands.

In 2016 Van Mol was asked to save the company foto.com, which was in WCO-fase instructed by the court of Nijvel in Belgium. Van Mol succeeded to reorganise the company within the 6 months the court had granted the company to escape WCO.

In 2018 Van Mol acquired the Flemish satirical website 'tScheldt Between 2018 and 2025 the magazine was subject to more than 80 courthandlings because of cartoons and articles. Mr Van Mol was arrested numerous times because of cartoons. The private house and companies of Mr Van Mol were ceased by armed police looking for the authors and cartoonists of the magazines as all contributors write and draw under pseudonyms. The magazine 'tScheldt started in 1995 an has about 30 contributors who all work voluntary.

In 2024 Van Mol was convicted of hate speech after he published several articles about the new spokesperson of the political party Open VLD, who had a migration background. Van Mol was given a six-month deferral, a fine of 4.000 euros and he also had to pay 2.500 euros of reimbursement for moral damages. However, on December 6, 2024, Gert Van Mol was acquitted on all counts by the Court of Appeal. The Court ruled that Gert Van Mol had not incited hatred in any way.
