= Gort (disambiguation) =

Gort is a town in Galway, Ireland.

Gort may also refer to:

- Gort, the name of two townlands in County Tyrone, Northern Ireland; see List of townlands of County Tyrone
- Gort (letter), twelfth letter of the Ogham alphabet

== Fiction ==
- Gort (The Day the Earth Stood Still), a fictional robot in the film
- Gort Junction, a level in the 2008 tower defense video game Ninjatown
- Gort Pig, a fictional character in Garfield and Friends

== People ==
- Viscount Gort, the title of two peerages in British and Irish history
  - John Prendergast-Smyth, 1st Viscount Gort (1742–1817), (Lord Gort).
  - John Vereker, 6th Viscount Gort (1886–1946), (Lord Gort) a World War II British Expeditionary Force commander
- Lindsey Gort, American actress
- Willy Gort, American politician
- F. G. L. Chester (1899–1946), nicknamed "Gort", a member of the Allies' Z Special Unit in World War II

== See also ==
- Gort cloud
