= Peter Goers =

Australian radio personality (born 1956)

Peter Goers OAM
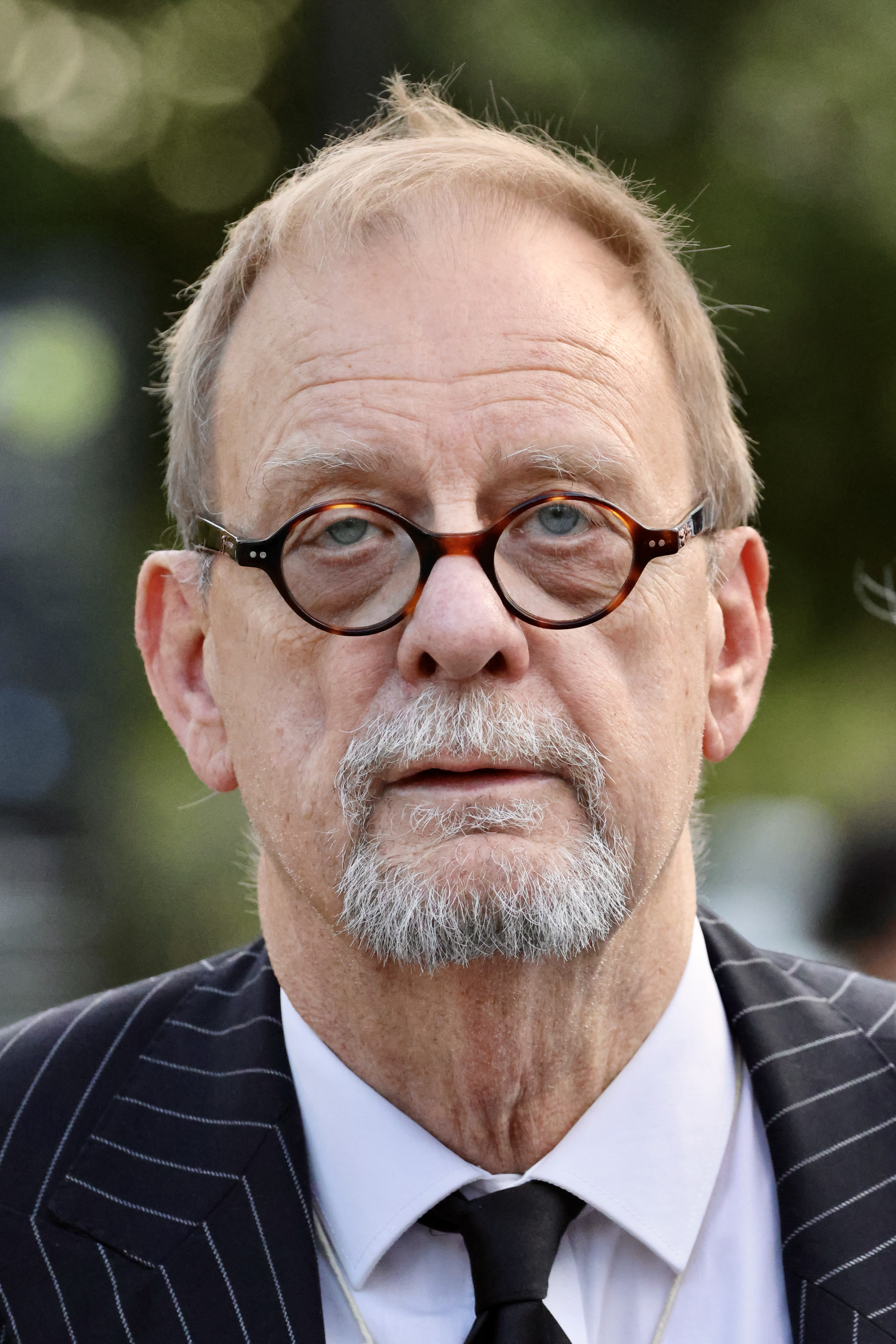
- Goers at the National War Memorial in 2026
- Born: 28 July 1956 (age 70); Adelaide, South Australia
- Education: Flinders University
- Presenting career
- Show: The Evening Show, Sunday Mornings
- Station: 891 ABC Adelaide
- Network: Australian Broadcasting Corporation
- Time slot: 7:00 pm Mon-Thu, 10 am Sun
- Style: Talkback
- Country: Australia

Peter Goers is a South Australian arts critic, producer, director, columnist and author who hosted The Evening Show for over twenty years on ABC Radio Adelaide, broadcasting throughout South Australia and to Broken Hill. Goers presented his final Evening Show with a live audience at Her Majesty's Theatre, Adelaide on Thursday November 30, 2023. His career spans over 40 years in the entertainment industry across a range of different mediums and formats including television, print, radio and theatre. In the Australia Day Honours, 2013, Goers was awarded the Medal of the Order of Australia (OAM) for his "service to the community as a radio broadcaster".

== Early life ==
Goers was born in Adelaide, raised in Woodville South and educated at both Woodville Primary and Findon High schools. Goers is a fifth-generation Australian of German and Irish descent. An influence in Goers' early life was teacher and former South Adelaide footballer Mick Rivers, who encouraged his interest in acting. Upon completion of his secondary schooling, Goers studied arts at Flinders University for eight years.

On 9 July 1982, both his parents were killed in a plane accident involving Pan Am Flight 759 which crashed shortly after takeoff from New Orleans, USA. He wrote a book about the experience in 2023.

== Career ==
=== Early career ===
In 1983, Goers started reviewing films for radio host Carole Whitelock on the then-named 5AN for the ABC, which led to commercial contracts, including 5DN and ten years at Austereo.

Goers worked as full-time historian of the Performing Arts Collection of South Australia with the South Australian director Colin Ballantyne. Having debuted as the Artful Dodger in Oliver! at the Woodville Town Hall in 1972, Goers has been involved in many amateur theatre companies in Adelaide as an actor and director, including as artistic director of the University of Adelaide Theatre Guild (1982–86), and with Jimmy Zoole Presents, Q Theatre Company and Adelaide Repertory Theatre.

During the same period, Jason Daniel, an arts editor for The Advertiser, had heard Goers' movie reviews and suggested that he also review theatre for the newspaper, which he did from 1985 to 1996. He became known as 'the critic that ate Adelaide'. While with The Advertiser he began writing an opinion column for the associated Sunday Mail in 1991. In 1986 he was abused by Fringe comedian Wendy Harmer during her show after providing a bad review, had his glasses broken, was spat on, and his notebook was taken and thrown at him.

Goers also hosted horror movies on Channel Ten Adelaide during the 1980s.

=== Mid career ===
In 1996 Goers left Adelaide and moved to Istanbul in Turkey. There he found work in theatre, working as a producer on local productions. He also returned to theatre reviewing, writing English-language reviews for a local paper.

Goers returned to Adelaide in 1998 and to News Limited's Sunday Mail as a regular columnist. The following year saw his return to local radio, with a Monday night slot on the commercial radio station FIVEaa. Two months later he was joined by Rex Jory and Pamela Francis to produce The Good, the Bad and the Ugly as a weekly panel, which soon expanded to a twice-weekly show with the addition of Alex Ward. Nevertheless, the show was to have a short life, and by early November of that year it had ended its run.

=== The ABC ===
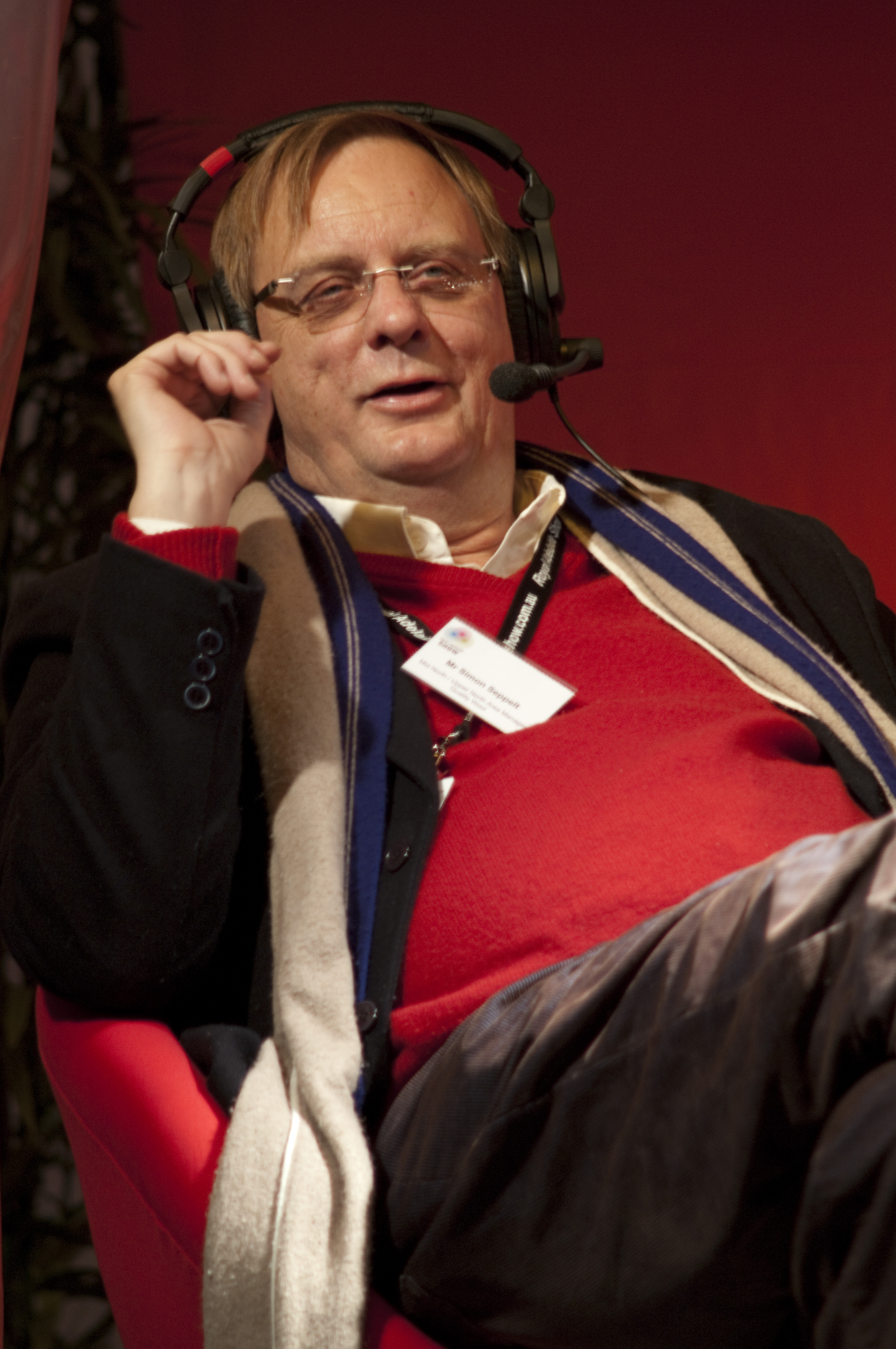
Goers conducting a live public radio broadcast, 2009

In 2003, Goers was invited to audition for the ABC. However, on the day when he was due to audition, Goers was requested by the management to fill in for Carole Whitelock, who had taken ill. This led to a return to radio on the ABC when he hosted the evening session for the station over the 2003/2004 summer break. From there he went on to host The Evening Show on a permanent basis.

The Evening Show is presented in a magazine format, with Goers interviewing local, national and international celebrities and academics in addition to a regular call-back segment and a quiz. The show also has several regular guests, including his Goers' Gals, Nick Prescott discussing film, and linguist Roly Sussex discussing the evolution of the English language.

Goers begins his show with "Hi ho, everybody", a line borrowed from Jack Davey and at the end of every show, Goers signs off with the line "Goodnight Mrs Calabash, wherever you are" – borrowed from Jimmy Durante.

Since 2019, Goers has presented Sunday Mornings from 10am til midday. The first hour of the show known as Smart Arts, is dedicated to covering South Australian arts, with critics Samela Harris and Steve Davis joining each week to discuss the week in the local arts scene. The second hour features talkback gardening with Goers joined by Sophie Thompson.

In October 2023 Goers announced his retirement from radio broadcasting, planned to occur in November that year.

=== Books ===
Goers has written two books 'Maddening Self Indulgent Crap' (2021) and 'In the Air of an Afternoon Almost Past: A memoir of loss' (2023) both published by Wakefield Press (Australia).

'In the Air of an Afternoon Almost Past' details the death of his parents in a plane crash and was the subject of his interview on Conversations with Richard Fidler in 2023 titled 'Peter's Long Goodbye'.

== Personal life ==
Goers was raised Methodist and has described himself as a Christian and also "a bit of an agnostic as are all reasonable people of reasonable faith. None of us knows if there is a God, but there's always hope." In an article encouraging tolerance between New Atheists and Christians, Goers was extremely critical of atheism. Regarding Islam, Goers has stated "Muslims do not proselytise and some of the best Christians I've ever known are Muslims."

Goers was critical of religious arguments against Same Sex Marriage and vocal in support of the "Yes" campaign during the Australian Marriage Law Postal Survey.

In 2025, Peter Goers was widely criticised for sexist remarks regarding Nicolle Flint, including from international media.

In September 2023 Goers wrote an article in The Advertiser in support of the Yes vote in the 2023 Australian Indigenous Voice referendum, in which he wrote "I don’t understand how our nation will deal with the international backlash a failure like a No vote will bring".

Peter Goers believes cyclists "are a scourge". In an opinion piece published in the Sunday Mail in 2026, Peter Goers stated he believes "Cyclists are parasites taking over our roads." In the article opposing the installation of separated bike lanes due to low cyclist volumes the day after installation, he claimed cyclists "terrorise pedestrians". He also claimed that "cyclists often terrorise pedestrians" in 2025, claiming "Cyclists demand and get bike lanes everywhere, which are rarely used." and that Adelaide is not Amsterdam. Regarding e-bikes, he claimed "it’s time they are banned" and that he has used an "open car door as a shield" against them. He described a policeman pulling over a cyclist as a "unique thrill".

In 2026, he was honoured with an Award for 50 years of Participation in the Adelaide Fringe .
