= Gert Wünsche =

German footballer

Personal information
- Full name: Gert Wünsche
- Date of birth: 19 February 1943 (age 83)
- Place of birth: Germany
- Position: Defender

Senior career*
Years	Team	Apps	(Gls)
1965–1969	Fortuna Düsseldorf	87	(0)
Total		87	(0)
- * Club domestic league appearances and goals

Gert Wünsche (born 19 February 1943) is a former German footballer.

Wünsche made 22 appearances for Fortuna Düsseldorf in the Fußball-Bundesliga during his playing career.
