= Geert =

Dutch name

- Pronunciation: Dutch: [ɣeːrt]
- Gender: male

Origin
- Origin: Germanic
- Meaning: Strong/Brave with the Spear
- Region of origin: Most common in The Netherlands and Flanders (Belgium)

Other names
- Related names: Gert, Gerd, Gertje, Geertje, Gerrit, Gerry, Jerry, Gerard, Gerhard, Gerald, Gerardus

Geert is a Dutch given name of Germanic origin, equivalent to the German Gerd and the English Gerry. The name is a condensed form of Gerard, itself a combination of the Germanic words ger (spear) and hard (strong or brave) meaning "strong" or "brave with the spear". The name's common female equivalent is Geertje.

The pronunciation of the name varies slightly, depending on whether or not the speaker uses a variety of Dutch which distinguishes between the phonemes /x/ and /ɣ/. While speakers of most northern varieties of Dutch, which do not distinguish between the two phonemes, will pronounce the name as [χeːrt] or [xeːrt], speakers of southern varieties will generally pronounce it as [ɣeːrt].

Although Geert is a name in its own right, it is often the given name of persons who are formally called Gerard or Gerardus. The latter name refers usually to saints Gerard of Toul or Gerard Majella.

== People with the given name ==
- Geert Bakker (1921–1993), Dutch sailor
- Geert Egberts Boer (1832–1904), American college president
- Geert Adriaans Boomgaard (1788–1899), Dutch supercentenarian
- Geert Bourgeois (born 1951), Belgian politician
- Geert Broeckaert (born 1960), Belgian football player
- Geert Brusselers (born 1970), Dutch football player
- Geert Chatrou (born 1969), Dutch musician
- Geert Cirkel (born 1978), Dutch rower
- Geert den Ouden (born 1976), Dutch football player
- Geert De Vlieger (born 1971), Belgian football player
- Geert De Vos (born 1981), Belgian dart player
- Geert Gabriëls (born 1979), Dutch politician
- Geert Groote (1340–1384), Dutch preacher
- Geert Hammink (born 1969), Dutch basketball player
- Geert Hofstede (1928–2020), Dutch psychologist
- Geert Hoste (born 1960), Belgian cabaret performer
- Geert Huinink, Dutch musician
- Geert Jan Jansen (born 1943), Dutch painter and art forger
- Geert Lambert (born 1967), Belgian politician
- Geert Lap (1951–2017), Dutch ceramist
- Geert Lotsij (1878–1959), Dutch rower
- Geert Lovink (born 1959), Dutch media theorist
- Geert Mak (born 1946), Dutch journalist and historian
- Geert Meijer (born 1951), Dutch football manager
- Geert Omloop (born 1974), Belgian cyclist
- Geert Pijnenburg (1896–1980), Belgian writer
- Geert Reuten (born 1946), Dutch economist and politician
- Geert Arend Roorda (born 1988), Dutch football player
- Geert Rouwenhorst, Dutch-born American economist
- Geert van Beijeren (1933–2005), Dutch art dealer
- Geert Van Bondt (born 1970), Belgian cyclist
- Geert Van Calster (born 1970), Belgian lawyer
- Geert Van de Walle (1964–1988), Belgian cyclist
- Geert Jan van Gelder (born 1947), Dutch academic
- Geert van Turnhout (1520–1580), Flemish composer
- Geert van Wou (1440–1527), Dutch bell maker
- Geert Versnick (born 1956), Belgian politician
- Geert Wilders (born 1963), Dutch politician

== Fictional characters ==
- Geert, in August Bournonville's comic ballet The Kermesse in Bruges

== See also ==
- Gert
