= Rudolf Goerz =

German botanist

Rudolf Goerz (sometimes spelled Rudolph) (born 1879 and died 1935) was a German botanist.

He was particularly interested in spermatophytes. Goerz edited and distributed two exsiccatae, namely Salices Brandenburgenses selectae and Salicaceae Asiaticae.
