= Geers =

Geers is a surname. Notable people with the surname include:

- Douglas Geers, American composer
- Edward Geers (1851–1924), American harness racer
- Gerardus Johannes Geers (1891–1965), Dutch linguist and Hispanist
- Kendell Geers (born 1968), South African artist

== See also ==
- Geer (disambiguation)
