= Belgian National Road Race Championships =

Annual cycling race

The Champion's Jersey

The Belgian National Road Race Championship is a cycling race which decides who will become Belgian national champion for the year to come. The men's record for most wins is currently held by one of the most successful Belgian sprinters, Tom Steels, who managed to take four road championship titles.

The winners of each event are awarded with a symbolic cycling jersey, which is black, yellow and red, like the national flag. These colours can be worn by the rider at other road racing events to show their status as national champion. The champion's stripes can be combined into a sponsored rider's team kit design for this purpose.

== Multiple champions ==
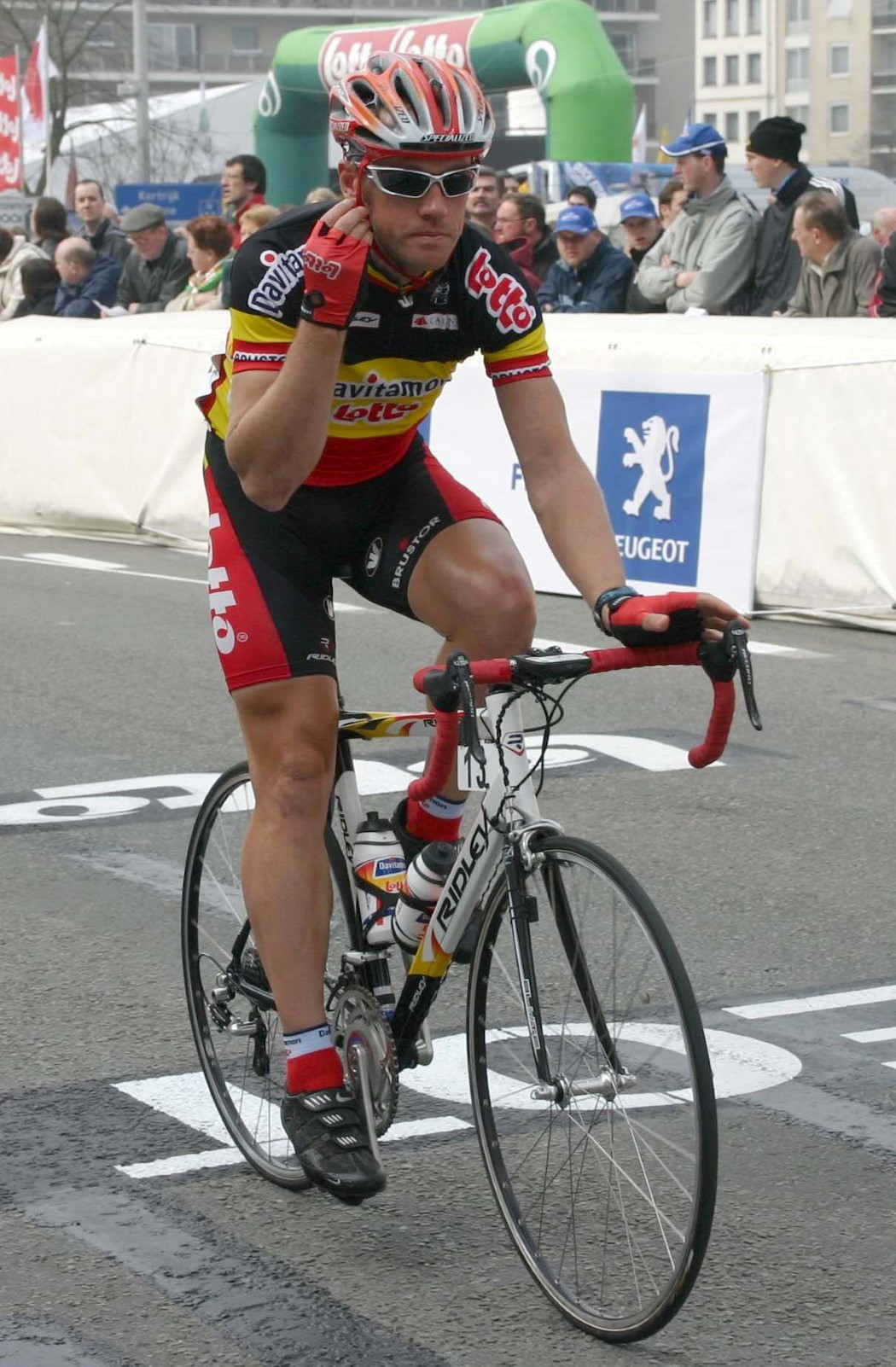
Tom Steels (pictured in the champion's jersey at the 2005 E3 Prijs Vlaanderen) is the men's record holder with four Belgian Championship wins.

The following riders that have managed to win the Elite race more than once.

=== Men ===
Wins	Riderev	Years
4	Tom Steels	1997, 1998, 2002, 2004
3	Rik Van Steenbergen	1943, 1945, 1954
3	Stijn Devolder	2007, 2010, 2013
2	Henri Luyten	1895, 1896
2	Henri Bertrand	1897, 1898
2	Francois Verstraeten	1907, 1908
2	Jules Vanhevel	1920, 1921
2	René Vermandel	1922, 1924
2	Félix Sellier	1923, 1926
2	Joseph Wauters	1929, 1930
2	Émile Masson Jr.	1946, 1947
2	André Vlayen	1956, 1957
2	Rik Van Looy	1958, 1963
2	Walter Godefroot	1965, 1972
2	Roger De Vlaeminck	1969, 1981
2	Michel Pollentier	1977, 1978
2	Johan Museeuw	1992, 1996
2	Wilfried Nelissen	1994, 1995
2	Tom Boonen	2009, 2012
2	Philippe Gilbert	2011, 2016
2	Tim Merlier	2019, 2022

=== Women ===
Wins	Rider	Years
5	Nicolle Van Den Broeck	1969, 1970, 1973, 1974, 1977
4	Jolien D'Hoore	2012, 2014, 2015, 2017
4	Lotte Kopecky	2020, 2021, 2023, 2024
3	Yvonne Reynders	1962, 1963, 1976
3	Mariette Laenen	1971, 1972, 1975
3	Agnes Dusart	1986, 1987, 1988
2	Maria Herrijgers	1978,1979
2	Nele D'Haene	1980, 1984
2	Kristel Werckx	1991, 1993
2	Heidi Van De Vijver	1994, 1998
2	Sonja Vermeylen	1996, 1997
2	Evy Van Damme	2000, 2001
2	Ludivine Henrion	2007, 2009
2	Liesbet De Vocht	2010, 2013

== Men ==
=== Elite ===
Belgian National Road Race Championships – Men's elite race
Race details
- Region: Belgium
- Discipline: Road bicycle racing
- Type: One-day
- Organiser: Royal Belgian Cycling League

History
- First edition: 1894
- Editions: 125 (as of 2025)
- First winner: Léon Houa
- Most wins: Tom Steels (4 wins)
- Most recent: Tim Wellens

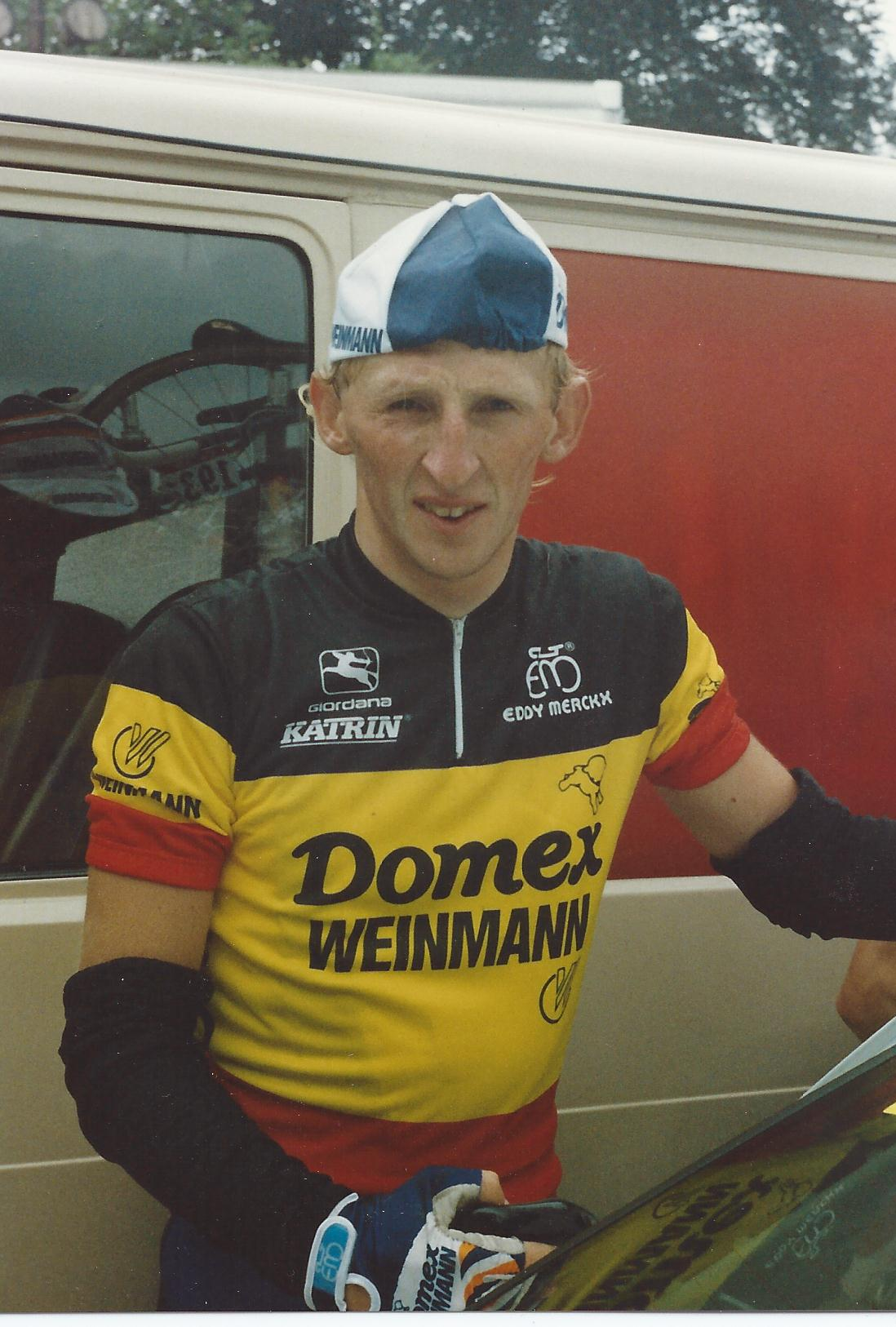
Carlo Bomans in the champion's jersey he won in 1989

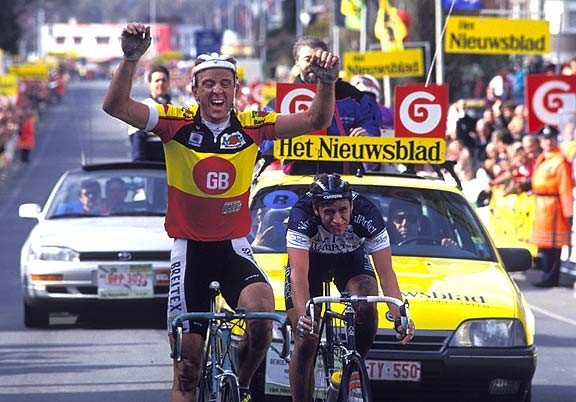
Johan Museeuw (left) winning the 1993 Tour of Flanders in the jersey of Belgian champion

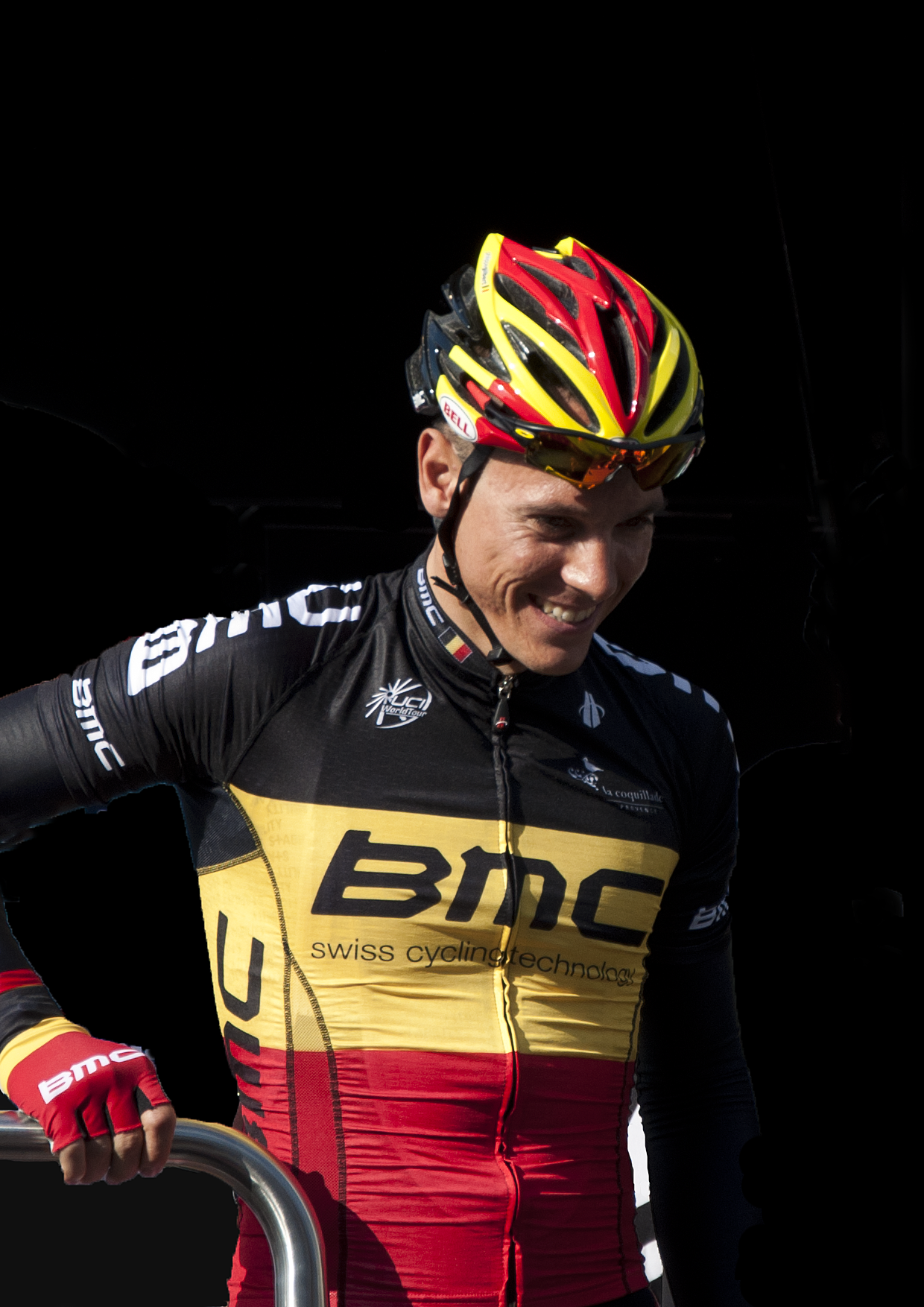
Philippe Gilbert, pictured in 2012

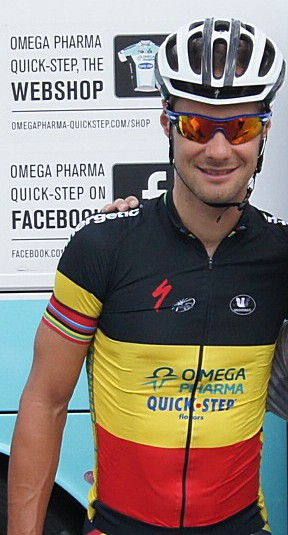
Tom Boonen (pictured at the 2012 Tour de Pologne) is a two-time winner of the Belgian Road Race Championships.

Year	Gold	Silver	Bronze
1894	Léon Houa	Alexei Schmidt	Leon Chisoigne
1895	Henri Luyten	René Nulens; Jean Walrant	
1896	Henri Luyten (2)	Georges Van Oolen	Henri Marnette
1897	Henri Bertrand	Maurice Virlee	Jozef Berchmans
1898	Henri Bertrand (2)	Maurice Virlee	Georges Luyten
1899	Jules Degeetere	Alphonse Seys	Fritz Vanderstuyft
1900	Mathieu Quoidbach	Hubert Meura	Williot
1901	Paul Burger	Van Horenbeek	Arthur Vanderstuyft
1902	Jules Defrance		
1903	Arthur Vanderstuyft	Julien Lootens	François Dhaen
1904	Jules Sales	Arthur Vanderstuyft	Théodore Sales
1905	Dieudonné Jamar	Henri Devroye	Joseph Achten
1906	Not held		
1907	Francois Verstraeten	Camille Haeck	Robert Wancour
1908	Francois Verstraeten (2)	Cyrille van Hauwaert	Eugène Platteau
1909	Cyrille van Hauwaert	Dieudonné Jamar	Fons Spiessens
1910	Henri Hanlet	Michel Debaets	Marcel Buysse
1911	Odile Defraye	Jules Masselis	Cyrille van Hauwaert
1912	Omer Verschoore	Félicien Salmon	Henri Devroye
1913	Joseph Van Daele	Jean Van Ingelghem	Jean Rossius
1914	Victor Dethier	Joseph Van Daele	Louis Mottiat
1915– 1918	Not held due to World War I		
1919	Jean Rossius	Joseph Van Daele	Louis Mottiat
1920	Jules Vanhevel	Louis Mottiat	René Vermandel
1921	Jules Vanhevel (2)	René Vermandel	Louis Mottiat
1922	René Vermandel	Philippe Thys	Félix Sellier
1923	Félix Sellier	Maurice De Waele	René Vermandel
1924	René Vermandel (2)	Félix Sellier	Denis Verschueren
1925	Gerard Debaets	Auguste Verdyck	Denis Verschueren
1926	Félix Sellier (2)	Julien Delbecque	Maurice Depauw
1927	August Mortelmans	Julien Delbecque	Leopold Matton
1928	Joseph Dervaes	Félix Sellier	Raymond Decorte
1929	Joseph Wauters	Georges Ronsse	Alfred Haemerlinck
1930	Joseph Wauters (2)	Joseph Dervaes	Alfred Haemerlinck
1931	Alphonse Schepers	Émile Joly	Gustaaf Van Slembrouck
1932	Georges Lemaire	Gustaaf Van Slembrouck	Michel Van Vlockhoven
1933	Louis Duerloo	Jozef Vanderhaegen	Constant Huys
1934	Louis Roels	Emile Bruneau	Jozef Vanderhaegen
1935	Gustave Danneels	Jef Demuysere	Félicien Vervaecke
1936	Jean Aerts	Louis Hardiquest	Michel D'Hooghe
1937	Karel Kaers	Maurice Raes	Adelin Van Simaeys
1938	Petrus Van Theemsche	Hubert Deltour	Marcel Kint
1939	Marcel Kint	Roger Vandendriessche	Albertin Disseaux
1940	Odiel Van Den Meersschaut	André Maelbrancke	Gustaaf Van Overloop
1941	André Defoort	Gustaaf Van Overloop	Achiel De Backer
1942	André Maelbrancke	Albert Sercu	Lucien Vlaemynck
1943	Rik Van Steenbergen	Georges Claes	Robert Van Eenaeme
1944	Not held		
1945	Rik Van Steenbergen (2)	Odiel Van Den Meersschaut	Jean Bogaerts
1946	Émile Masson Jr.	Briek Schotte	Maurice Van Herzele
1947	Émile Masson Jr. (2)	Jacques Geus	Maurice Meersman
1948	Achiel Buysse	Briek Schotte	Ernest Sterckx
1949	Valère Ollivier	Raymond Impanis	Prosper Depredomme
1950	Albert Ramon	Briek Schotte	Valère Ollivier
1951	Lode Anthonis	Edward Peeters	Emmanuel Thoma
1952	Jozef Schils	Robert Vanderstockt	Marcel De Mulder
1953	Alois Vansteenkiste	Florent Rondelé	Stan Ockers
1954	Rik Van Steenbergen (3)	Roger Decock	René De Smet
1955	Emiel Van Cauter	Germain Derycke	Jan Storms
1956	André Vlayen	Frans Schoubben	Karel Clerckx
1957	André Vlayen (2)	Roger Verplaetse	Karel Clerckx
1958	Rik Van Looy	Jef Planckaert	Frans Aerenhouts
1959	Petrus Oellibrandt	Jan Adriaensens	Daniel Denys
1960	Frans De Mulder	Willy Vannitsen	Arthur Decabooter
1961	Michel Van Aerde	Arnould Flecy	Jos Hoevenaers
1962	Jef Planckaert	Guillaume Van Tongerloo	Emile Daems
1963	Rik Van Looy (2)	Louis Proost	Frans Aerenhouts
1964	Edward Sels	Willy Bocklant	Frans Melckenbeeck
1965	Walter Godefroot	Eddy Merckx	Arthur Decabooter
1966	Guido Reybrouck	Robert Lelangue	Jos Huysmans
1967	Jozef Boons	Willy In 't Ven	Émile Bodart
1968	Julien Stevens	Ferdinand Bracke	Guido Reybrouck
1969	Roger De Vlaeminck	Walter Godefroot	Alfons De Bal
1970	Eddy Merckx	Herman Vanspringel	Jean-Pierre Monseré
1971	Herman Vanspringel	Jozef Spruyt	Willy Van Neste
1972	Walter Godefroot (2)	Eddy Merckx	Albert Van Vlierberghe
1973	Frans Verbeeck	Eddy Merckx	Willy Planckaert
1974	Roger Swerts	Ludo Van Staeyen	Johan De Muynck
1975	Willy Teirlinck	Willy Planckaert	Eddy Merckx
1976	Freddy Maertens	Jean-Luc Vandenbroucke	Willy Teirlinck
1977	Michel Pollentier	Joseph Bruyère	Paul Wellens
1978	Michel Pollentier (2)	Willy Teirlinck	Marcel Laurens
1979	Gery Verlinden	Eddy Schepers	Marc Renier
1980	Jos Jacobs	Dirk Heirweg	Eddy Schepers
1981	Roger De Vlaeminck (2)	Gery Verlinden	Benjamin Vermeulen
1982	Frank Hoste	Eddy Vanhaerens	Alfons De Wolf
1983	Lucien Van Impe	Marc Sergeant	Michel Dernies
1984	Eric Vanderaerden	Eddy Planckaert	Frank Hoste
1985	Paul Haghedooren	Claude Criquielion	Rudy Dhaenens
1986	Marc Sergeant	Hendrik Devos	Etienne De Wilde
1987	Ferdi Van Den Haute	Jean-Pierre Heynderickx	Herman Frison
1988	Etienne De Wilde	Herman Frison	Jean-Philippe Vandenbrande
1989	Carlo Bomans	Eddy Planckaert	Alfons De Wolf
1990	Claude Criquielion	Edwig Van Hooydonck	Frank Van Den Abeele
1991	Benjamin Van Itterbeeck	Jim Van De Laer	Wilfried Peeters
1992	Johan Museeuw	Johan Capiot	Johan Devos
1993	Alain Van Den Bossche	Guy Nulens	Carlo Bomans
1994	Wilfried Nelissen	Michel Vanhaecke	Peter Verbeken
1995	Wilfried Nelissen (2)	Tom Steels	Johan Museeuw
1996	Johan Museeuw (2)	Geert Van Bondt	Johan Bruyneel
1997	Tom Steels	Ludo Dierckxsens	Kurt Van De Wouwer
1998	Tom Steels (2)	Carlo Bomans	Peter Van Petegem
1999	Ludo Dierckxsens	Michel Vanhaecke	Axel Merckx
2000	Axel Merckx	Frank Vandenbroucke	Rik Verbrugghe
2001	Ludovic Capelle	Fabien De Waele	Michel Vanhaecke
2002	Tom Steels (3)	Ludovic Capelle	Gert Vanderaerden
2003	Geert Omloop	Jurgen Van Goolen	Sven Vanthourenhout
2004	Tom Steels (4)	Geert Omloop	Geert Verheyen
2005	Serge Baguet	Kevin van Impe	Nico Sijmens
2006	Niko Eeckhout	Philippe Gilbert	Tom Boonen
2007	Stijn Devolder	Tom Boonen	Philippe Gilbert
2008	Jürgen Roelandts	Sven Vanthourenhout	Niko Eeckhout
2009	Tom Boonen	Philippe Gilbert	Kristof Goddaert
2010	Stijn Devolder (2)	Philippe Gilbert	Frederik Veuchelen
2011	Philippe Gilbert	Gianni Meersman	Jelle Wallays
2012	Tom Boonen (2)	Kristof Goddaert	Sven Vandousselaere
2013	Stijn Devolder (3)	Gianni Meersman	Jan Bakelants
2014	Jens Debusschere	Roy Jans	Tom Boonen
2015	Preben Van Hecke	Jürgen Roelandts	Greg Van Avermaet
2016	Philippe Gilbert (2)	Tim Wellens	Greg Van Avermaet
2017	Oliver Naesen	Sep Vanmarcke	Jasper Stuyven
2018	Yves Lampaert	Philippe Gilbert	Jasper Stuyven
2019	Tim Merlier	Timothy Dupont	Wout van Aert
2020	Dries De Bondt	Iljo Keisse	Pieter Serry
2021	Wout van Aert	Edward Theuns	Remco Evenepoel
2022	Tim Merlier (2)	Jordi Meeus	Jasper Philipsen
2023	Remco Evenepoel	Alec Segaert	Jasper Stuyven
2024	Arnaud De Lie	Jasper Philipsen	Jordi Meeus
2025	Tim Wellens	Remco Evenepoel	Jasper Philipsen
2026	Rune Herregodts	Jonas Rickaert	Fabio Van den Bossche

=== Amateur / elite without contract ===
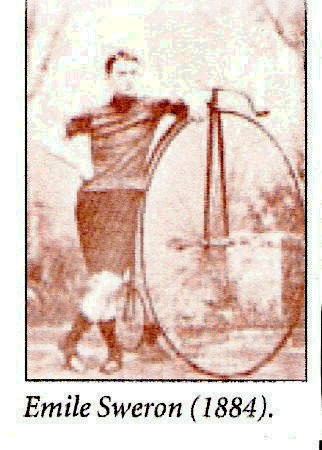
Emile Sweron national champion 1884

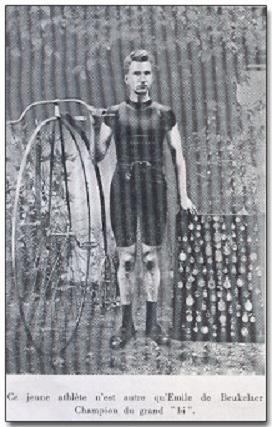
Emile De Beukelaer national champion 1885-1886

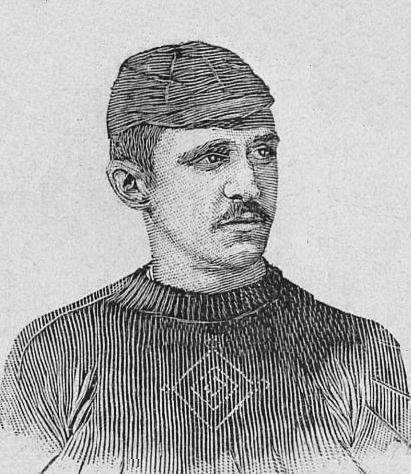
Léon Houa national champion 1893

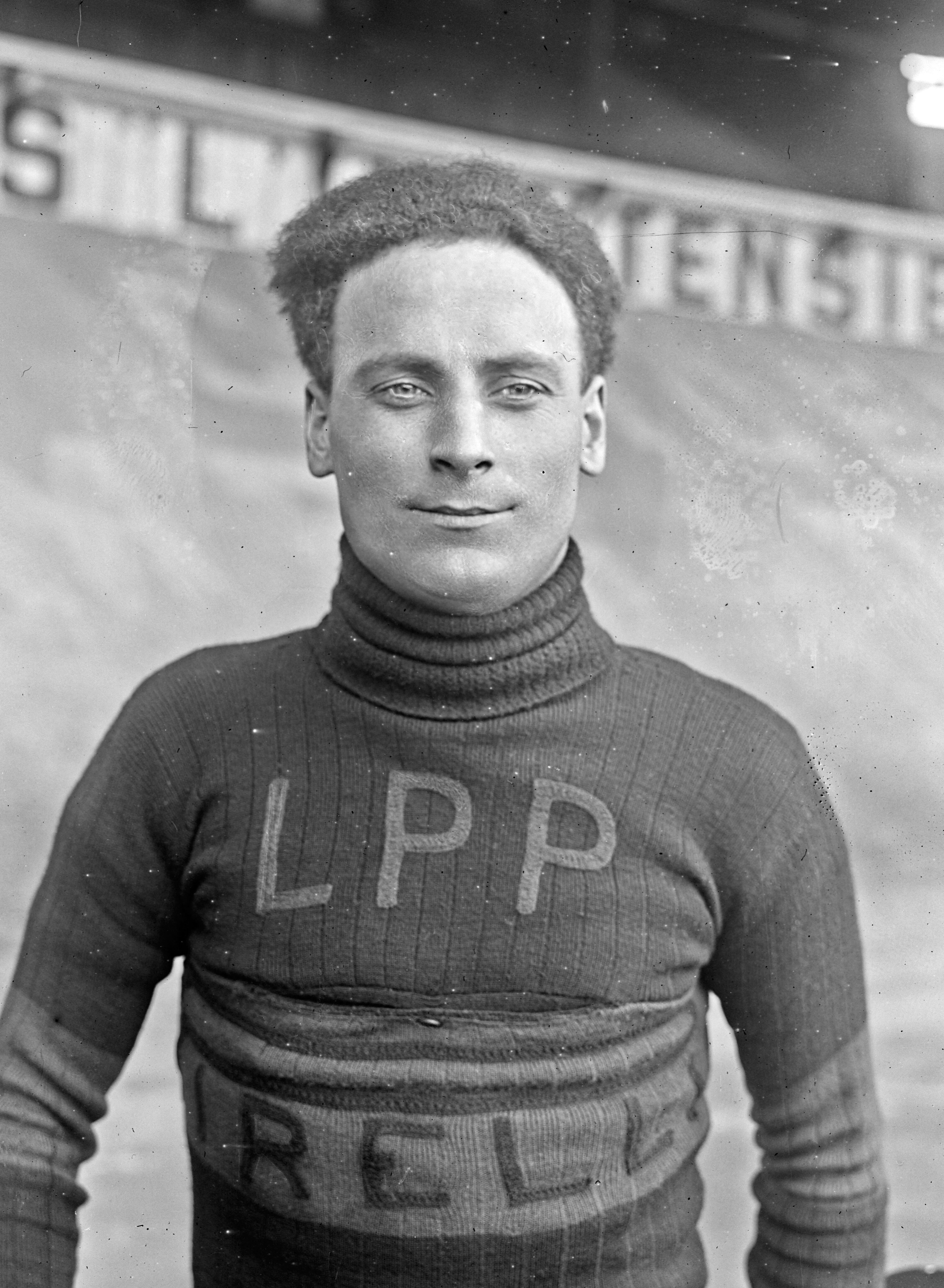
Henri Wynsdau national champion 1920

The first amateur championship was contested in 1882. In 1947 it absorbed the former junior category (19 to 22 years). In 1966 this category took the name "international amateurs" when the category of independents disappeared. The "Elite without contract" category replaced the international amateurs in 1996. From that date, riders aged 19 to 22 contest the Under-23 championship, also called "espoirs".

Year	Gold	Silver	Bronze
1882	Emile Van Berendonck	L. Noiset	E. Goemans
1883	Not held		
1884	Emile Sweron	Emile De Beukelaer	
1885	Emile De Beukelaer	Delvaux	Emile Sweron
1886	Emile De Beukelaer		
1887 (1000m Velocipede)	Ernest Goethals	Emile Sweron	
1887 (5000m Tricycle)	Vos	Emile Sweron	
1888	Léon Lhoest		
1889	Léon Lhoest		
1890	Georges Choisy	Joseph Sklin	Robert Protin
1891	Georges Van Oolen	Louis Rasquinet	Léon Van Calck
1892	Louis Gehenniaux	Léon Houa	Georges Dormal
1893	Léon Houa		
1894	Henri Luyten	Georges Van Oolen	Stendel
1895–1901	Not held		
1902	Émile Lombard		
1903	Servais Touissant		
1904	J. Orban		
1905	Servais Toussaint	Armand Pirlot	Alphonse Van Hout
1906–1907	Not held		
1908	Alois Verstraeten		
1909	François Dubois		
1910	Jacques Coomans		
1911	J. Sel		
1912	L. Van Cauter		
1913	Frédéric Parmentier	Jean Patou	L. Van Koeckhoven
1914–1918	Not held		
1919	Albert Debunne	Henri Wynsdau	Henri George
1920	Henri Wynsdau	Albert Debunne	Charles Van Doorslaer
1921	Charles Van Doorslaer	Henri George	Ferd. Lintermans
1922	Henri Hoevenaers	Louis De Roover	Charles Van Doorslaer
1923	Henri Hoevenaers	Alphonse Decat	Fernand Saivé
1924	Henri Hoevenaers	Fernand Saivé	Jean-François De Buyst
1925	Henri Hoevenaers	Jules Verbist	Jean-François De Buyst
1926	Marcel Cloquet	Jean Aerts	Ferd. Lintermans
1927	Jean Aerts	Jean Chaerels	André Verstraeten
1928	Jean Aerts	Jean Chaerels	André Verstraeten
1929	Albert Muylle	Leo Van der Meersch	Pierre Houdé
1930	Leo Van der Meersch	Maurice Parmentier	And. Lismont
1931	Jean Minsart	Louis Van der Borght	Josse Broeders
1932	Luc Poffe	Henri Van der Stee	Henri Roggemans
1933	Jef Lowagie	Pierre Houdé	Lucien Poffé
1934	Pierre Houdé	Jef Lowagie	Jean Lodewijck
1935	Jean-François Van Der Motte	Louis Dehogne	Pierre Houdé
1936	Armand Putzeyse	Auguste Garrebeek	Jean-François Van Der Motte
1937	Auguste Deleeuw	Raymond Debroux	Geo. Berckmans
1938	Jacques Geus	Omer Tack	Jean-François Van Der Motte
1939	Jacques Geus	Willy Parmentier	Jean-François Van Der Motte
1940	Not held		
1941	Irené De Keyser	Henri Regenmortels	And. Parmentier
1942	Marcel Boumon	Karel Terryn	Albert Defrez
1943–1944	Not held		
1945	Henri Van Hole	Maurice Christiaens	Van Hoeymissen
1946	Henri Van Kerckhove	Luc Buysse	Herman Gardier
1947	Frans Gielen	Roger Decock	Alfons Van den Brande
1948	Lode Wouters	Liévin Lerno	Théodore Lossie
1949	Léon De Lathouwer	René Daelman	Karel Loomans
1950	Martin Van Geneugden	Jozef Schils	Roger Wyckstand
1951	Marcel Janssens	José Pauwels	Jan Zagers
1952	Rik Van Looy	Georges Decraeye	Noël Malfait
1953	Rik Van Looy	Emiel Van Cauter	Adhemar De Blaere
1954	Julien Schepens	Gabriel Borra	Gentiel Saelens
1955	Gentiel Saelens	Maurice Meuleman	Aimé Van Avermaet
1956	Alfons Hermans	Roger Baudechon	Norbert Verougstraete
1957	Clément Roman	Marcel Sleeuwaert	Julien Gekière
1958	Constant De Keyser	Valère Paulissen	Émile Daems
1959	Herman Cornelis	Albert Covens	Georges Van Maeckelberghe
1960	Joseph Geurts	Jan Desmet	Romain Malfait
1961	Frans Melckenbeeck	Constant Jongen	Remi De Bruycker
1962	Julien Stevens	Marcel Vandenbossche	Edward Sels
1963	Albert Van Vlierberghe	Noël De Pauw	Mathieu Maes
1964	Jos Boons	Leopold Lemmens	Armand Geens
1965	Eddy De Sitter	Louis Van den Broeck	Willy In 't Ven
1966	Jean-Marie Gorez	Eddy Van Audenaerde	Raymond Steegmans
1967	Valère Van Sweevelt	Jean-Pierre Monseré	Roger De Vlaeminck
1968	Noël Vantyghem	Jean-Pierre Monseré	Rony Schoep
1969	Raf Hooyberghs	Jean-Pierre Monseré	Frans Kerremans
1970	Victor Peeters	Tony Gakens	Willy Teirlinck
1971	Freddy Maertens	Ludo Van Staeyen	Ludovic Noels
1972	Lucien De Brauwere	Louis Verreydt	Johan Hendrickx
1973	Leopold Verboven	Pol Lannoo	Georges Bortels
1974	Jean-Luc Vandenbroucke	Luc Leman	Raphael Constant
1975	Pol Verschuere	Patrick Lefevere	Paul Wellens
1976	Eddy Schepers	Marc Dierickx	Pierre Sonnet
1977	Daniel Willems	Frank Hoste	Claude Criquielion
1978	Fons De Wolf	Daniel Willems	Ronald Delen
1979	Eddy Van Hoof	Gerrit Van Gestel	Etienne De Wilde
1980	Jean-Marie Wampers	Guy Janiszewski	Patrick Vermeulen
1981	Marc Sergeant	Eric Lamers	Patrick Hermans
1982	Francis Vermaelen	Rudy Rogiers	Patrick Cocquyt
1983	Rudy Dexters	Herman Frison	Filip Cottenies
1984	Johan Capiot	Willem Wijnant	Guido Verdeyen
1985	Geert Van de Walle	Frank Van de Vijver	Geert D'Hondt
1986	Chris Scharmin	Ludwig Willems	Frank Pattyn
1987	Danny Lippens	Jean-Marie Vernie	Johan Pauwels
1988	Luc Van de Vel	Patrick De Wael	Johnny Dauwe
1989	Johan Remels	Peter Hoydonckx	Tony De Ridder
1990	Wilfried Nelissen	Johan Remels	Wim Vervoort
1991	Peter Van Petegem	Wim Vervoort	Stéphane Hennebert
1992	Wim Omloop	Carl Roes	Bart Heirewegh
1993	Carl Roes	Paul Van Hyfte	Kurt Van de Wouwer
1994	Mario Moermans	Carl Roes	Eric Torfs
1995	Steven Van Aken	Dennis Moons	Danny In 't Ven
1996	Benjamin Van Itterbeeck	Steven Van Aken	Danny In 't Ven
1997	Danny In 't Ven	Peter Van Hoof	Rik Coppens
1998	Dennis Moons	Peter Van Hoof	Thierry Masschelein
1999	Marc Patry	Geoffrey Demeyere	Marc Chanoine
2000	Kenneth Mercken	Marc Goetschalckx	Christophe Stevens
2001	Jarno Vanfrachem	Christophe Stevens	Peter Schoonjans
2002	Bart Heirewegh	Gino De Weirdt	Eric Torfs
2003	Jarno Vanfrachem	Nico Mestdagh	Peter Schoonjans
2004	Jurgen Vermeersch	Nico Kuypers	Geert Steurs
2005	Gert Vanderaerden	Nico Verhoeven	David Vanhove
2006	Kristof De Zutter	Geoffrey Demeyere	Dries Devenyns
2007	Tony Bracke	Mario Willems	Nico Verhoeven
2008	Davy Commeyne	Joeri Calleeuw	Kurt Van Goidshoven
2009	Nico Kuypers	Jan Kuyckx	David Geldhof
2010	Rob Goris	Kurt Geysen	Joeri Calleeuw
2011	Joeri Calleeuw	Dries Depoorter	Kevin Neirynck
2012	Timothy Dupont	Nick Mertens	Timothy Stevens
2013	Jérôme Baugnies	Stig Broeckx	Robin Stenuit
2014	Joeri Calleeuw	Timothy Stevens	Jori Van Steenberghen
2015	Joeri Stallaert	Jori Van Steenberghen	Timothy Stevens
2016	Dries De Bondt	Jimmy Janssens	Dimitri Peyskens
2017	Stijn De Bock	Jens Moens	Dieter Bouvry
2018	Rutger Wouters	Jonas Goeman	Dries Verstrepen
2019	Jelle Mannaerts	Brecht Stas	Sten Van Gucht
2020	Stijn Siemons	Timothy Stevens	Benjamin Verraes
2021	Tom Timmermans	Kobe Vanoverschelde	Wesley Van Dyck
2022	Vince Gerits	Niels De Rooze	Wesley Van Dyck
2023	Jari Verstraeten	Maarten Verheyen	Rutger Wouters
2024	Elias Van Breussegem	Sven Noels	Jonas Volkaert
2025	Elias Van Breussegem	Jarno Bellens	Gil D'Heygere

==== Multiple winners ====
Wins	Rider
4	Henri Hoevenaers
2	Rik Van Looy
2	Emile De Beukelaer
2	Jean Aerts
2	Jacques Geus
2	Elias Van Breussegem
2	Joeri Calleeuw
2	Jarno Vanfrachem
2	Léon Lhoest
2	Servais Touissant

=== Under 23 ===
Year	Gold	Silver	Bronze
1996	Rolf Verhaegen	Koen Das	Dave Bruylandts
1997	Jurgen Vermeersch	Dirk D'Haemers	Bert De Waele
1998	Sven Spoormakers	Dave Bruylandts	Koen Van De Velde
1999	Andy Cappelle	Björn Leukemans	Jehudi Schoonacker
2000	Andy Cappelle (2)	Tom Boonen	Ludovic Draux
2001	Tom Boonen	Dimitri De Fauw	Kevin Van der Slagmolen
2002	Nick Nuyens	Philippe Gilbert	Bart Dockx
2003	Koen Barbé	Jonathan Henrion	Kristof De Zutter
2004	Maarten Wynants	Jean-Paul Simon	Pieter Duyck
2005	Dries Devenyns	Lars Croket	Maxime Vantomme
2006	Greg Van Avermaet	Jérôme Giaux	Pieter Vanspeybrouck
2007	Pieter Muys	Klaas Lodewyck	Bjorn Coomans
2008	Dimitri Claeys	Jérôme Baugnies	Jan Bakelants
2009	Dimitri Claeys (2)	Walt De Winter	Sven Vandousselaere
2010	Laurens De Vreese	Yannick Eijssen	Jochen Vankerckhoven
2011	Tim Declercq	Sander Helven	Eliot Lietaer
2012	Jorne Carolus	Tim De Troyer	Roy Jans
2013	Jens Wallays	Maarten Craeghs	Frederik Frison
2014	Jef Van Meirhaeghe	Bert Van Lerberghe	Jelle Donders
2015	Nathan Van Hooydonck	Jenthe Biermans	Michael Cools
2016	Joachim Vanreyten	Enzo Wouters	Alexander Geuens
2017	Jordi Van Dingenen	Franklin Six	Stan Dewulf
2018	Gerben Thijssen	Jens Reynders	Tom Verhaegen
2019	Florian Vermeersch	Gilles De Wilde	Sébastien Grignard
2020	Jordi Meeus	Arne Marit	Simon Dehairs
2021	Maarten Verheyen	Thibau Nys	Lennart Van Eetvelt
2022	Jarne Van de Paar	Axel De Kinder	Alex Vandenbulcke
2023	Simon Dehairs	Floris Van Tricht	Gianluca Pollefliet
2024	Sente Sentjens	Senne Hulsmans	Tom Crabbe

== Women ==
=== Elite ===
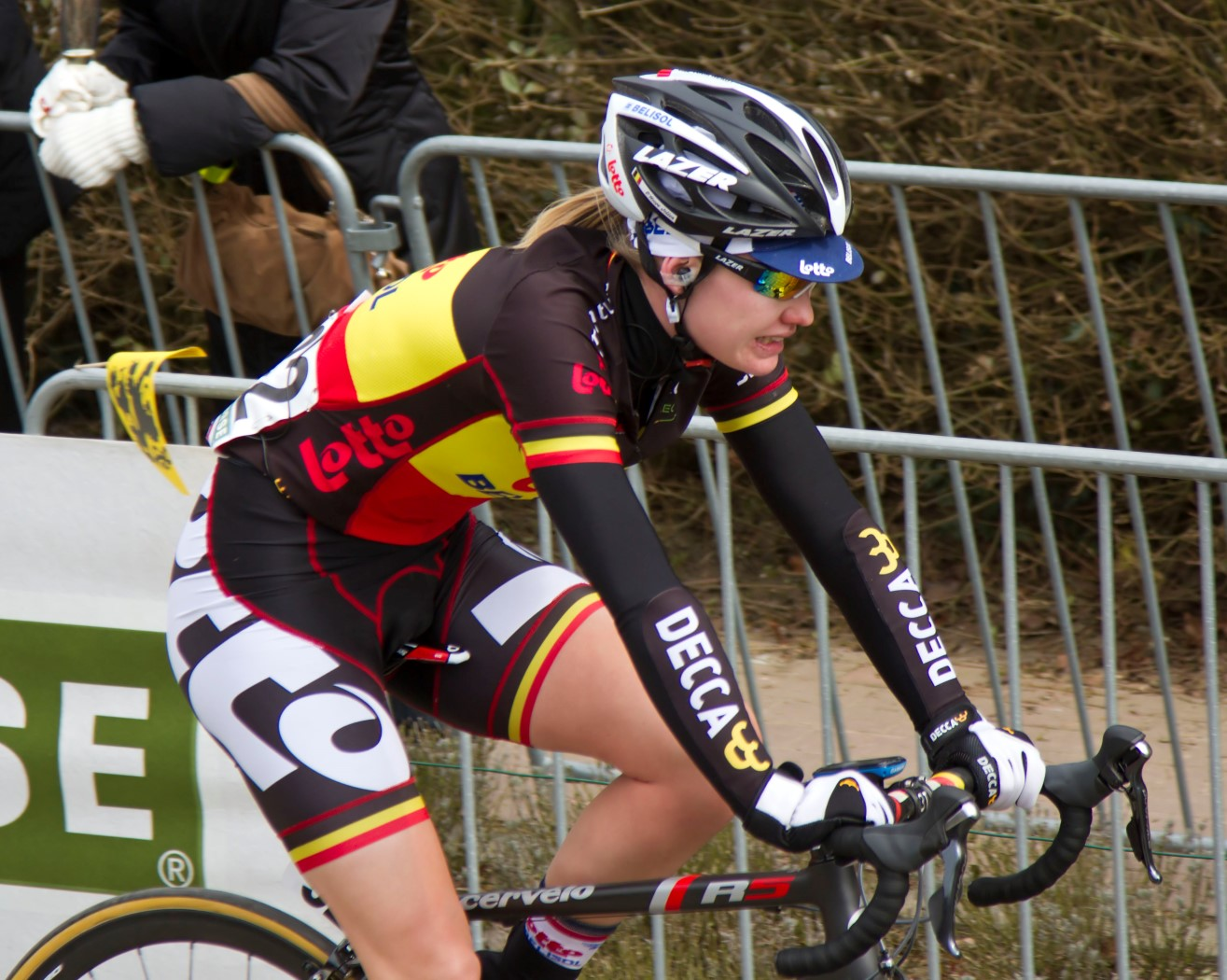
Jolien D'Hoore (pictured in 2013) shares the record for the most Belgian championships in the women's category, with four victories.

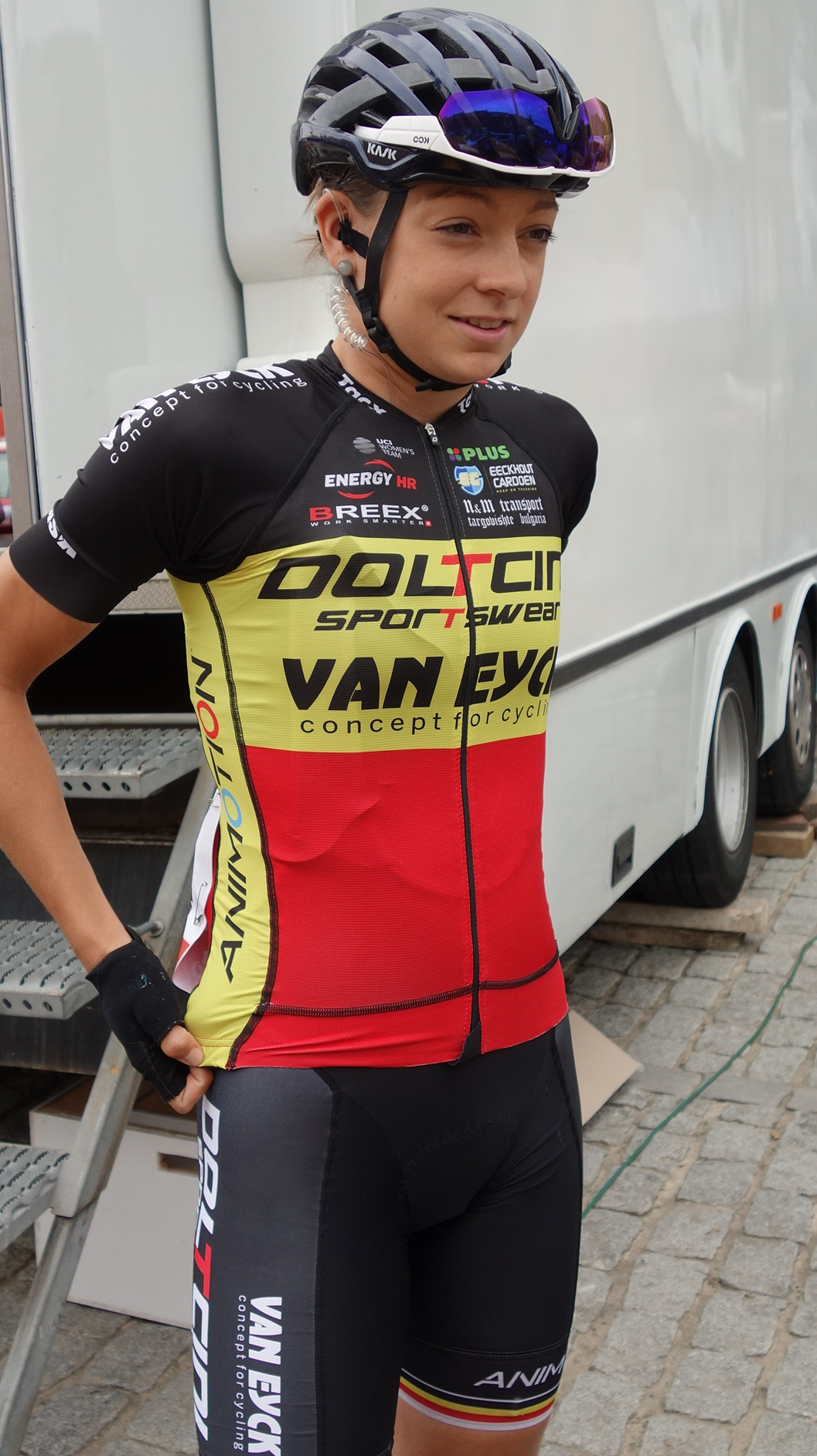
Jesse Vandenbulcke in the Belgian champion's jersey in 2019

Year	Gold	Silver	Bronze
1959	Victoire Van Nuffel	Rosa Sels	Liliane Cleiren
1960	Rosa Sels	Yvonne Reynders	Nadia Germonpre
1961	Annie Vermeiren	Yvonne Reynders	Rosa Sels
1962	Yvonne Reynders	Simone Ellegeest	Liliane Cleiren
1963	Yvonne Reynders (2)	Louisa Smits	Simone Ellegeest
1964	Denise Bral	Rosa Sels	Marie-Thérèse Naessens
1965	Louisa Smits	Marie-Thérèse Naessens	Francine Verlot
1966	Marie-Rose Gaillard	Simone Ellegeest	Suzanne Sohie
1967	Christiane Geerts	Louisa Smits	Francine Verlot
1968	Marguerita Dams	Nicolle Van Den Broeck	Francine Verlot
1969	Nicolle Van Den Broeck	Suzanne Sohie	Christiane Goeminne
1970	Nicolle Van Den Broeck (2)	Christiane Geerts	Francine Verlot
1971	Mariette Laenen	Christiane Geerts	Francine Verlot
1972	Mariette Laenen (2)	Nicolle Van Den Broeck	Francine Verlot
1973	Nicolle Van Den Broeck (3)	Christiane Goeminne	
1974	Nicolle Van Den Broeck (4)	Mariette Laenen	Francine Verlot
1975	Mariette Laenen (3)	Christiane Goeminne	Johanna Bosmans
1976	Yvonne Reynders (3)	Christiane Goeminne	Nicolle Van Den Broeck
1977	Nicolle Van Den Broeck (5)	Mariette Laenen	Yvonne Reynders
1978	Maria Herrijgers	Christiane Goeminne	Frieda Maes
1979	Maria Herrijgers (2)	Sonja Pleysier	Marie-Hélène Schiffers
1980	Nele D'Haene	Chantal Van Havere	Maria-Magdalena Kennes
1981	Gerda Sierens	Marina Mampay	Maria Herrijgers
1982	Jenny De Smet	Gerda Sierens	Anna Callebaut
1983	Ingrid Mekers	Gerda Sierens	Anna Callebaut
1984	Nele D'Haene (2)	Jenny De Smet	Gerda Sierens
1985	Josiane Vanhuysse	Nadine Fiers	Marleen Clemminck
1986	Agnes Dusart	Josiane Vanhuysse	Nadine Fiers
1987	Agnes Dusart (2)	Sonja Vermeylen	Els Mertens
1988	Agnes Dusart (3)	Kristel Werckx	Sylvie Slos
1989	Sylvie Slos	Sabine Snijers	Els Mertens
1990	Véronique De Roose	Godelieve Jansens	Kristel Werckx
1991	Kristel Werckx	Heidi Van De Vijver	Monica Van Nassauw
1992	Godelieve Jansens	Sabine Snijers	Véronique Schurmann
1993	Kristel Werckx (2)	Monica Van Nassauw	Vanja Vonckx
1994	Heidi Van De Vijver	Patsy Maegerman	Anja Lenaers
1995	Els Decottenier	Sonja Vermeylen	Vanja Vonckx
1996	Sonja Vermeylen	Linda Troyekens	Patsy Maegerman
1997	Sonja Vermeylen (2)	Els Decottenier	Anja Lenaers
1998	Heidi Van De Vijver (2)	Sonja Vermeylen	Anja Lenaers
1999	Cindy Pieters	Vanja Vonckx	Els Decottenier
2000	Evy Van Damme	Lensy Debboudt	Sonja Vermeylen
2001	Evy Van Damme (2)	Ine Wannijn	Godelieve Jansens
2002	Ine Wannijn	Corine Hierckens	Veronique Belleter
2003	Anja Nobus	Ilse Geldhof	Veerle Ingels
2004	Natacha Maes	Ine Wannijn	Sara Peeters
2005	Corine Hierckens	Sara Peeters	Natasha Nobels
2006	Veronique Belleter	Karen Steurs	Ine Wannijn
2007	Ludivine Henrion	Ine Wannijn	Liesbet De Vocht
2008	Ilse Geldhof	Nana Steenssens	Anne Arnouts
2009	Ludivine Henrion (2)	Latoya Brulee	Kelly Druyts
2010	Liesbet De Vocht	Kelly Druyts	Evelyn Arys
2011	Evelyn Arys	Sofie De Vuyst	Lensy Debboudt
2012	Jolien D'Hoore	Ludivine Henrion	Jessie Daams
2013	Liesbet De Vocht (2)	Maaike Polspoel	Sofie De Vuyst
2014	Jolien D'Hoore (2)	Lotte Kopecky	Sofie De Vuyst
2015	Jolien D'Hoore (3)	Lotte Kopecky	Sofie De Vuyst
2016	Kaat Hannes	Lotte Kopecky	Jolien D'Hoore
2017	Jolien D'Hoore (4)	Lotte Kopecky	Kelly Druyts
2018	Annelies Dom	Valerie Demey	Sanne Cant
2019	Jesse Vandenbulcke	Ann-Sophie Duyck	Julie Van de Velde
2020	Lotte Kopecky	Jolien D'Hoore	Shari Bossuyt
2021	Lotte Kopecky (2)	Julie Van de Velde	Alana Castrique
2022	Kim de Baat	Fien van Eynde	Sara Maes
2023	Lotte Kopecky (3)	Marthe Goossens	Kelly Druyts
2024	Lotte Kopecky (4)	Sanne Cant	Justine Ghekiere
2025	Justine Ghekiere	Fien Van Eynde	Fleur Moors
2026	Shari Bossuyt	Lotte Kopecky	Sandrine Tas

== See also ==
- Belgian National Time Trial Championships
- National road cycling championships
- Belgium at the UCI Road World Championships
