= 1982 UCI Road World Championships – Women's road race =

Women's road race
1982 UCI Road World Championships
- Rainbow jersey

Race details
- Dates: 4 September 1982
- Stages: 1 in (United Kingdom) Goodwood (GBR)
- Distance: 61 km (37.90 mi)
- Winning time: 1h 31' 00"

Medalists
	Gold	(United Kingdom) Mandy Jones (GBR)
	Silver	(Italy) Maria Canins (ITA)
	Bronze	(Belgium) Gerda Sierens (BEL)

The 1982 UCI Road World Championships - Women's Road Race took place on the 4th of september 1982 around Goodwood, Sussex in the United Kingdom. It was 61 km in length.

Mandy Jones broke clear of the field to win by 10 seconds. She was the first British woman to win a world championship for 15 years. She said:

"I won by accident. It was just plain daft. We were going downhill and I just rode past them. Then I looked back, saw I had a gap and kept going. I was praying my legs wouldn't collapse. But with around half a lap to go, I started thinking 'Hey, I could win this!"

== Final classification ==
Rank	Rider	Country	Time
1	Mandy Jones	United Kingdom	1h31'00"
1	Maria Canins	Italy	at 0'10"
1	Gerda Sierens	Belgium	
4	Sandra Schumacher	West Germany	at 0'26"
5	Connie Carpenter-Phinney	United States	at 0'42"
6	Rebecca Twigg	United States	
7	Ute Enzenauer	West Germany	
8	Karen Ann Strong-Hearth	Canada	
9	Emanuela Menuzzo	Italy	
10	Kathrine Lundström	Sweden	
11	Tuulikki Jahre	Sweden	
12	Helle Sørensen	Denmark	
13	Marianne Berglund	Sweden	
14	Tamara Poliakova	Ukraine	
15	Leontine van der Lienden	Netherlands	
16	Nina Søbye	Norway	
17	Rosemarie Kurz	Switzerland	
18	Anna Callebaut	Belgium	
19	Ines Varenkamp	West Germany	
20	Thea van Rijnsoever	Netherlands	at 0'57"
21	Beate Habetz	West Germany	
22	Nadezhda Kibardina	Soviet Union	
23	Anna-Karin Johansson	Sweden	
24	Josiane Vanhuysse	Belgium	at 1'02"
25	Irina Kolesnikova	Soviet Union	
26	Annelies Josefsson	Sweden	
27	Marie-Jeanne Thijs	Belgium	
28	Connie Meijer	Netherlands	
29	Alla Lukutina	Soviet Union	
30	Francesca Galli	Italy	
31	Galina Tsareva	Soviet Union	
32	Petra Weigenand	West Germany	
33	Luisa Seghezzi	Italy	
34	Barbara Ganz	Switzerland	
35	Isabelle Gautheron	France	
36	Birgit Förstl	West Germany	
37	Anne Guillemin	France	
38	Wakako Abe	Japan	
39	Cynthia Olavarri	United States	
40	Maria Johnsson	Sweden	
41	Jenny De Smet	Belgium	
42	Béatrice Labarthe	France	at 1'14"
43	Hennie Top	Netherlands	
44	Els Gottschal	Netherlands	
45	Li Yanmei	China	
46	Mieke Havik	Netherlands	
47	Rebecca Daughton	United States	
48	Adalberta Marcuccetti	Italy	
49	Nina Johnsen	Norway	
50	Valentina Tverdokhlebe	Soviet Union	
51	Geneviève Brunet	Canada	at 3'11"
52	Hanni Weiss	Switzerland	at 3'32"
53	Jolanda Kalt	Switzerland	
54	Geneviève Gauthier	Canada	
55	Margaret Swinnerton	United Kingdom	
56	Anne-Catherine Andersen	Norway	
57	Rosanna Piantoni	Italy	
58	Julie Earnshaw	United Kingdom	
59	Isabelle Nicoloso-Verger	France	
60	C Baril	Canada	
61	Pauline Strong	United Kingdom	
62	Verna Buhler	Canada	at 5'15"
63	Claudine Vierstraete	Belgium	at 5'32"
64	Gabi Habetz	West Germany	at 10'13"
65	Sun Jinngin	China	at 10'33"
66	Unni Larsen	Norway	at 11'38"
67	Gu Li	China	at 12'20"
68	Zlatuše Hrnčířová	Czechoslovakia	at 12'51"
69	Stefania Carmine	Switzerland	
