= Bosman =

Bosman is a Dutch and Afrikaans toponymic surname, originally derived from the Dutch word bos meaning "wood".

People with this surname include:

- Albert E. Bosman, Dutch mathematic, inventor of the Pythagoras tree.
- André Bosman (born 1965), Dutch politician
- Andrea Bosman (born 1979), Dutch bicycle racer
- Andries Bosman (1621–c. 1681), Flemish priest and flower painter
- Antonia Bosman (born 1996), Chilean actress
- Charne Bosman (born 1975), South African long-distance runner
- Dick Bosman (born 1944), American baseball player
- Eljo Bosman (born 1985), Dutch game producer
- Elizabeth Joanna Bosman (1894–1963), South African author
- Fred Bosman (born 1944), Dutch pathologist
- Herman Charles Bosman (1905–1951), South African writer and journalist
- James Bosman, American politician
- Jean-Marc Bosman (born 1964), Belgian footballer
- John Bosman (born 1965), Dutch footballer
- Len Bosman (1924–2017), Australian politician
- Loots Bosman (born 1977), South African cricketer
- Lourie Bosman (born 1941), South African politician
- Machiel Bosman (born 1972), Dutch historian and writer
- Melodie Bosman (born 1976), New Zealand rugby union player
- Meyer Bosman (born 1985), South African rugby player
- Patrick Bosman (born 1994), Dutch-born Austrian racing cyclist
- Petrus Bosman (1928–2008), South African ballet dancer and choreographer
- Rogier Bosman (born 1974), Dutch jazz musician
- Willem Bosman (1672 – after 1703), Dutch merchant living in Ghana

== Other ==
- Bosman ruling, a European Court of Justice decision on association football players' contracts in an action brought by Jean-Marc Bosman
- Bosman Brewery, a Polish brewery
- Bosman language, a language of Papua New Guinea
- Bosman's potto or just potto, after Willem Bosman who described this prosimian in 1703
- "Bosman", Polish and Russian term for some navy Petty Officers after Dutch "bootsman"/German "Bootsmann" (ship's man)
- Bosman Family Vineyards, a South African winery

== See also ==
- Bosmans
- Peter Bossman (born 1955), Ghanaian-born Slovenian doctor and politician
