= Bosmans =

Bosmans is a Dutch and Afrikaans toponymic surname, meaning "woodmen". It is more common in Belgium (5,779 people in 2008) than in the Netherlands (779 people), where the form Bosman is more abundant (9,937 people). People with this surname include:

- Brigitte Bosmans (born 1965), Belgian swimmer
- Henriëtte Bosmans (1895–1952), Dutch composer
- Evelien Bosmans (born 1989), Belgian actress
- Fernand Bosmans (1883–1960), Belgian fencer
- Henri Bosmans (1852–1928), Belgian mathematician and historian
- Henri Bosmans (musician) (1856–1896), Dutch cellist
- Johanna Bosmans (born c.1950), Belgian racing cyclist
- Juul Bosmans (1914–2000), Belgian hurdler
- Kris Bosmans (born 1980), Belgian racing cyclist
- Phil Bosmans (1922–2012), Belgian priest and author
- Sarah Bosmans-Benedicts (1861–1949), Dutch pianist
- Wietse Bosmans (born 1991), Belgian racing cyclist

== See also ==
- Bosman
