= Goeminne =

Goeminne is a Belgian surname. Notable people with the surname include:

- Christiane Goeminne, Belgian cyclist
- Paul Goeminne (1888–?), Belgian ice hockey player
