= Henri Bertrand =

Henri Bertrand may refer to:

- Henri Gatien Bertrand (1773–1844), French general
- Henri Bertrand (entomologist) (1892–1978), French entomologist
- Henri Bertrand (cyclist), Belgian cyclist
