= Vermeylen =

Vermeylen is a surname. Notable people with the surname include:

- August Vermeylen (1872–1945), Belgian writer
- Piet Vermeylen (1904–1991), Belgian lawyer
- Sonja Vermeylen (born 1964), Belgian racing cyclist
