= Schiffers =

Schiffers is a surname. Notable people with the surname include:

- Andrzej Boleslaw Schiffers, Polish businessman
- Emanuel Schiffers (1850–1904), Russian chess player and chess writer
- Marie-Hélène Schiffers, Belgian racing cyclist

== See also ==
- Schiffer
