= Emile Sweron =

Belgian cyclist

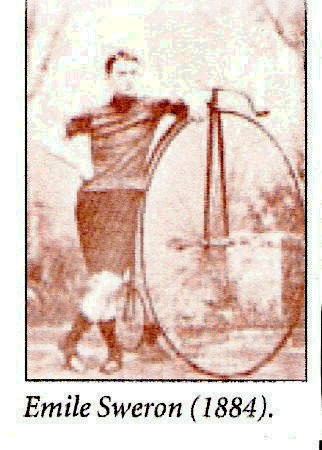
- Sweron in 1884

Personal information
- Born: 27 January 1864 Ixelles, Belgium

Cycling career
- Sport: Cycling
- Discipline: Road
- Role: Rider

Amateur team
- Royale Union Vélocipédique Louvaniste

Major wins
- Belgian National Road Race Championships (1884)

Emile Sweron (born 27 January 1864) was a Belgian road cyclist during the 1880s. He was a pioneer in the earliest era of Belgian road cycling and co-founder of the cycling club Union Velocipédique Louvaniste. He won many national and international races, including the 1884 Belgian National Road Race Championships.

== Biography ==
=== Personal life ===
Sweron was born in Ixelles, in 1864. He studied agronomy at Institut Agronomique.

=== Cycling ===
He founded together with Joseph Delin the cycling club Union Velocipédique Louvaniste on 22 September 1882. It was the first cycling club of Leuven. The association played a pioneering role in the early days of Belgian cycling and had a significant role in the foundation, among others, of the Paris–Brussels cycling classic. It would receive the designation royal.

Sweron was one of the main cyclists of his era, with 1884 his best year. He was the winner of the 1884 Belgian National Road Race Championships on 7 September in Ostend, receiving 100 Belgian francs and a gold medal. Also in 1884, he won an international race in Antwerp in August and races in Ostend.

In 1886, he won an international race in Liège, and in 1887 he won two silver medals at the Belgian National Road Race Championships. He finished second in July in Ostend in the 10,000m velocipede championships and in August he finished second in the 5,000m tricycle championships.

==== Results ====
1884
(gold) Belgian National Road Race Championships
1st Ixelles
1st Antwerp international race
1st Ostend, 2100m race
1st Ostend, 50m race

1885
2nd Spa
1st Tournai
1st Antwerp (Warande) (3000m)
2nd Warande (2000m; tricycle tandems) together with Wilrickx
2nd Maastricht international speed race (behind Emile De Beukelaer)
2nd Maastricht, international long distance race
2nd Maastricht, international 6000m handicap race

1886
1st Liège international race
2nd Liege (long distance)
2x 1st Antwerp Bicycle Club, course vélocipédiques
2nd International race Antwerp Bicycle Club (1607m)

1887
(silver) Belgian National Road Race Championships (10000m velocipede)
(silver) Belgian National Road Race Championships (5000m tricycle)
