= Mandy Jones =

Mandy Jones may refer to:

- Mandy Jones (cyclist)
- Mandy Jones (politician)
