= Joseph Achten =

Belgian cyclist (born 1885)

Personal information
- Born: 6 June 1885 Tilleur, Belgium

Cycling career
- Sport: Cycling
- Disciplines: Road; Track
- Role: Rider

Professional teams
- 1903: Individual
- 1904: Mulsse
- 1905-1909: Individual

Joseph Achten (born 6 June 1885) was a Belgian track and road cyclist in the early era of road cycling. He was a professional cyclist from 1903 to 1909. He achieved multiple podium finished in prominent cyle races, including winning the bronze medal at the Belgian National Road Race Championships. He also participated in the second edition of the Tour de France in 1904.

== Biography ==
Achten was born in June 1885 in Tilleur. He became professional in 1903. He competed both on the road and on the track. At the track he won the GP de Crotteux and 6 heures Verviers and competed in 24-hours races. He finished that year third in Ougrée–Marche–Ougrée. The next year he rode with professional team Mulsse and finished second in Queue-du-Bois and Herstal.

On the track was his main rival Dieudonné Jamar, from whom he lost in most occasions in with many second places. Combatting against each other, they were called "brothers".

On the road he competed at main (international) cycling races. He participated in the second edition of the Tour de France, the 1904 Tour de France. In 1905 at the age of 20 he won the bronze medal at the 1905 Belgian National Road Race Championships behind Dieudonné Jamar and Henri Devroye.

He remained active through the late 1900s, with results including podium finishes in races such as GP d'Engis, Bierset and Pousset.

== Major results ==
1903
1st GP de Crotteux
1st 6 heures Verviers
3rd Ougrée–Marche–Ougrée

1904
2nd Queue-du-Bois
2nd Herstal

1905
3rd Belgian National Road Race Championships
2nd GP d'Engis

1908
3rd Bierset
3rd Pousset
