= Defrance =

Defrance or DeFrance may refer to:

- Chris DeFrance (born 1956), a former American football player
- Hélène Defrance (born 1986), French sailor
- Jacques Louis Marin DeFrance (1758-1850), a French malacologist
- Jean-Marie Defrance (1771–1835), a French General of the French Revolutionary Wars and the Napoleonic Wars
- Jules Defrance, a Belgian racing cyclist
- Léonard Defrance (1735-1805), a Flemish painter
