= Clemminck =

Clemminck is a surname. Notable people with the surname include:

- Marleen Clemminck (born 1958), Belgian cyclist
- Ranjith Clemminck-Croci (fl. 2022), Sri Lankan-born Dutch politician
