= Mathieu Quoidbach =

Belgian cyclist

Personal information
- Full name: Mathieu Quoidbach
- Born: 21 September 1873 Verviers, Belgium
- Died: 11 October 1951 (aged 78) Verviers, Belgium

Cycling career
- Sport: Cycling
- Role: Rider

Mathieu Quoidbach (21 September 1873 – 11 October 1951) was a Belgian racing cyclist. He won the Belgian national road race title in 1900.
