= Nele D'Haene =

Belgian cyclist

Personal information
- Full name: Nele D'Haene
- Born: 13 February 1960 (age 66) Wevelgem, Belgium

Cycling career
- Sport: Cycling
- Role: Rider

Nele D'Haene (born 13 February 1960) is a former Belgian racing cyclist. She won the Belgian national road race title in 1980 and 1984.
