= Liliane Cleiren =

Belgian cyclist

Personal information
- Full name: Liliane Cleiren
- Born: 1 April 1942 (age 84)

Cycling career
- Sport: Cycling
- Role: Rider

Liliane Cleiren (born 1 April 1942) is a former Belgian racing cyclist. She finished in third place in the Belgian National Road Race Championships in 1959 and 1962.
