= Natasha Nobels =

Belgian cyclist

Natasja Nobels
Personal information
- Full name: Natasja Nobels
- Born: 24 September 1980 (age 46) Dendermonde, Belgium

Cycling career
- Sport: Cycling
- Role: Rider

Natasja Nobels (born 24 September 1980) is a former Belgian racing cyclist. She finished in third place in the Belgian National Road Race Championships in 2005.
