= Denise Bral =

Belgian cyclist

Personal information
- Full name: Denise Bral

Cycling career
- Sport: Cycling
- Role: Rider

Denise Bral is a former Belgian racing cyclist. She won the Belgian national road race title in 1964.
