= Godelieve Jansens =

Belgian cyclist

Personal information
- Full name: Godelieve Jansens
- Born: 26 March 1964 (age 62) Turnhout, Belgium

Cycling career
- Sport: Cycling
- Role: Rider

Godelieve Jansens (born 26 March 1964) is a former Belgian racing cyclist. She won the Belgian national road race title in 1992.
