= Ine Wannijn =

Belgian cyclist

Personal information
- Full name: Ine Wannijn
- Born: 11 April 1982 (age 44) Oudenaarde, Belgium

Cycling career
- Sport: Cycling
- Role: Rider

Ine Wannijn (born 11 April 1982) is a former Belgian racing cyclist. She won the Belgian national road race title in 2002.
