= Mariette Laenen =

Belgian cyclist

Personal information
- Full name: Mariette Laenen
- Born: 1 March 1950 (age 76) Hulshout, Belgium

Cycling career
- Sport: Cycling
- Role: Rider

Mariette Laenen (born 1 March 1950) is a former Belgian racing cyclist. She won the Belgian national road race title in 1971, 1972 and 1975.
