= Bosman Family Vineyards =

Wine estate in Wellington, Western Cape

- Location: Wellington and Hemel-en-Aarde Valley, Western Cape, South Africa
- Founded: 1699
- Key people: Petrus Bosman, Corlea Fourie, Rita Andreas, Carla Bosman, Neil Büchner
- Parent company: Bosman Adama (Pty) Ltd
- Known for: Bosman Adama Red blend, Bosman Optenhorst Chenin Blanc, De Bos Walker Bay Sauvignon Blanc, De Bos Handpicked Merlot, Fides Orange Wine
- Tasting: Weekdays: 09h00-17h00; Saturdays: by appointment
- Website: www.bosmanwines.com

Bosman Family Vineyards is situated on the farm Lelienfontein in Wellington in the Western Cape, South Africa. The farm produces wines for the local and export market, and is home to one of the most influential vine nurseries in Africa.

== History ==
The Lelienfontein Estate was originally issued to French Huguenot Philip de Royan in 1699 by Governor Willem Adriaan van der Stel. The first generation of the Bosman family settled on the farm in 1798. The Lelienfontein Estate produced wine until 1957, when the family turned their focus to their vine nursery. In 2007, the Bosmans returned to winemaking and released the first wines from the renovated 260-year-old cellar.

== Social Development and Fairtrade practices ==
In 2008, a landmark joint venture between Bosman Family Vineyards and the Adama Workers Trust saw the formation of the biggest Black Economic Empowerment deal in the South African wine industry to date, with eligible workers receiving co-ownership of 430ha of farming land. Many of the 260 full-time workers on the estate are from 5th generation families who together own 26% of the business.

In 2009, the Bosmans’ ethical and sustainable methods of producing and trading their wine received official Fairtrade certification. In 2015 the wine farm was the runner-up for Ethical Company of the Year at The Drinks Business Green Business Awards. Wines with the Fairtrade accreditation are produced under the De Bos label.

== Nero d'Avola in South Africa ==
In 2004, Bosman Family Vineyards imported Nero d'Avola plant material into South Africa. After two years in quarantine, only two vines survived. From this, the farm cultivated a vineyard by grafting Nero d'Avola onto established Cabernet Sauvignon rootstock. In 2014, the first bottling of Nero d'Avola was approved by the Wine and Spirits Board. The wine has been approved and noted in the Government Gazette and the first certified bottling of Nero d'Avola in South Africa was released at the annual Bosman Family Vineyards Release Celebration in November 2015.

== Lelienfontein Vine Growers ==
The Bosman family have been practicing the art of grafting and growing wine, table and raisin grapes since 1888, initially for own use on their wine estate. Lelienfontein Vine Growers started when Petrus Bosman Senior sold his surplus vines for the first time in 1947. High-quality material was in short supply and it was his ambition to have a pedigree attached to each vine sold.

== Location ==
Bosman Family Vineyards is situated in Hexberg Road, Wellington, which is within an hour's drive from Cape Town International Airport.
