= Anja Lenaers =

Belgian cyclist

Personal information
- Full name: Anja Lenaers
- Born: 28 March 1972 (age 54) Membruggen, Belgium

Cycling career
- Sport: Cycling
- Role: Rider

Anja Lenaers (born 28 March 1972) is a Belgian former racing cyclist. She finished in third place in the Belgian National Road Race Championships in 1994, 1997 and 1998.
