= Els Decottenier =

Belgian cyclist

Personal information
- Full name: Els Decottenier
- Born: 7 September 1968 (age 58) Zwevegem, Belgium

Cycling career
- Sport: Cycling
- Role: Rider

Els Decottenier (born 7 September 1968) is a former Belgian racing cyclist. She won the Belgian national road race title in 1995.
