= Jozef Boons =

Belgian cyclist (1943–2000)

- Boons as Belgian champion in 1967

Personal information
- Full name: Jozef Boons
- Born: 13 February 1943 Vorst, Belgium
- Died: 15 December 2000 (aged 57) Laakdal, Belgium

Cycling career
- Sport: Cycling
- Role: Rider

Jozef Boons (13 February 1943 – 15 December 2000) was a Belgian racing cyclist. He won the Belgian national road race title in 1967. He also competed in the individual road race at the 1964 Summer Olympics. He died in 2000 after being hit by a truck.
