= Jules Sales =

Belgian cyclist

Personal information
- Full name: Jules Sales
- Born: 23 June 1875 Brussels, Belgium

Cycling career
- Sport: Cycling
- Role: Rider

Jules Sales (born 23 June 1875, date of death unknown) was a Belgian racing cyclist. He won the Belgian national road race title in 1904.
