= Maria-Magdalena Kennes =

Belgian cyclist

Personal information
- Full name: Maria-Magdalena Kennes
- Born: 23 May 1960 (age 66)

Cycling career
- Sport: Cycling
- Role: Rider

Maria-Magdalena Kennes (born 23 May 1960) is a former Belgian racing cyclist. She finished in third place in the Belgian National Road Race Championships in 1980.
