= Veronique Belleter =

Belgian cyclist

Personal information
- Full name: Veronique Belleter
- Born: 29 October 1977 (age 48) Sint-Niklaas, Belgium

Cycling career
- Sport: Cycling
- Role: Rider

Veronique Belleter (born 29 October 1977) is a former Belgian racing cyclist. She won the Belgian national road race title in 2006.

== Major results ==
2006
9th Omloop Het Volk
