= Maria Herrijgers =

Belgian cyclist

Personal information
- Full name: Maria Herrijgers
- Born: 3 July 1955 (age 71) Kalmthout, Belgium

Cycling career
- Sport: Cycling
- Role: Rider

Maria Herrijgers (born 3 July 1955) is a former Belgian racing cyclist. She won the Belgian national road race title in 1978 and 1979.
