= Louis Roels =

Belgian cyclist

- Roels as Belgian champion in 1934

Personal information
- Full name: Louis Roels
- Born: 12 August 1912 Hamme, Belgium
- Died: 17 September 1984 (aged 72) Dendermonde, Belgium

Cycling career
- Sport: Cycling
- Role: Rider

Louis Roels (12 August 1912 – 17 September 1984) was a Belgian racing cyclist. He won the Belgian national road race title in 1934.
