= Sara Peeters =

Belgian cyclist

Personal information
- Full name: Sara Peeters
- Born: 15 February 1985 (age 41) Lier, Belgium

Cycling career
- Sport: Cycling
- Role: Rider

Sara Peeters (born 15 February 1985) is a former Belgian racing cyclist. She finished in second place in the Belgian National Road Race Championships in 2005.
