= Ingrid Mekers =

Belgian cyclist

Personal information
- Full name: Ingrid Mekers
- Born: 15 May 1962 (age 64) Hasselt, Belgium

Cycling career
- Sport: Cycling
- Role: Rider

Ingrid Mekers (born 15 May 1962) is a former Belgian racing cyclist. She won the Belgian national road race title in 1983.
