= Corine Hierckens =

Belgian racing cyclist

Personal information
- Full name: Corine Hierckens
- Born: 30 May 1982 (age 44) Verviers, Belgium

Cycling career
- Sport: Cycling
- Role: Rider

Corine Hierckens (born 30 May 1982) is a former Belgian racing cyclist. She won the Belgian national road race title in 2005.
