= Christiane Geerts =

Belgian cyclist

Personal information
- Full name: Christiane Geerts

Cycling career
- Sport: Cycling
- Role: Rider

Christiane Geerts is a Belgian former racing cyclist. She won the Belgian national road race title in 1967.

== Career ==
Geerts competed in the Cycling World Championships three times between 1966 and 1970. She placed 14th in the Women's Road Race in both 1966 and 1967, however her best result was an 8th place in the same event in 1970.
