= Véronique Schurmann =

Belgian cyclist

Personal information
- Full name: Véronique Schurmann
- Born: 13 June 1967 (age 59) Dendermonde, Belgium

Cycling career
- Sport: Cycling
- Role: Rider

Véronique Schurmann (born 13 June 1967) is a former Belgian racing cyclist. She finished in third place in the Belgian National Road Race Championships in 1992.
