= Paul Burger =

Belgian cyclist

Personal information
- Full name: Paul Burger
- Born: 16 June 1877
- Died: 14 October 1933 (aged 56)

Cycling career
- Sport: Cycling
- Role: Rider

Paul Burger (16 June 1877 – 14 October 1933) was a Belgian racing cyclist. He won the Belgian national road race title in 1901.
