= Sonja Pleysier =

Belgian cyclist

Personal information
- Full name: Sonja Pleysier

Cycling career
- Sport: Cycling
- Role: Rider

Sonja Pleysier is a former Belgian racing cyclist. She finished in second place in the Belgian National Road Race Championships in 1979.
