= Nana Steenssens =

Belgian cyclist

Personal information
- Full name: Nana Steenssens
- Born: 28 October 1974 (age 51) Antwerp, Belgium

Cycling career
- Sport: Cycling
- Role: Rider

Nana Steenssens (born 28 October 1974) is a former Belgian racing cyclist. She finished in second place in the Belgian National Road Race Championships in 2008.
