= Véronique De Roose =

Belgian cyclist

Personal information
- Full name: Véronique De Roose
- Born: 30 October 1970 (age 55) Oudenaarde, Belgium

Cycling career
- Sport: Cycling
- Role: Rider

Véronique De Roose (born 30 October 1970) is a former Belgian racing cyclist. She won the Belgian national road race title in 1990.
