= Suzanne Sohie =

Belgian cyclist

Personal information
- Full name: Suzanne Sohie

Cycling career
- Sport: Cycling
- Role: Rider

Suzanne Sohie is a former Belgian racing cyclist. She finished in second place in the Belgian National Road Race Championships in 1969.
