= Marina Mampay =

Belgian cyclist

Personal information
- Full name: Marina Mampay
- Born: 9 June 1962 (age 64) Lier, Belgium

Cycling career
- Sport: Cycling
- Role: Rider

Marina Mampay (born 9 June 1962) is a former Belgian racing cyclist. She finished in second place in the Belgian National Road Race Championships in 1981.
