= Francois Verstraeten =

Belgian cyclist

Personal information
- Full name: Francois Verstraeten
- Born: 23 March 1887 Etterbeek, Belgium
- Died: 28 August 1965 (aged 78) Woluwe-Saint-Lambert, Belgium

Cycling career
- Sport: Cycling
- Role: Rider

Francois Verstraeten (23 March 1887 – 28 August 1965) was a Belgian racing cyclist. He won the Belgian national road race title in 1907 and 1908.
