= Ilse Geldhof =

Belgian cyclist

Personal information
- Full name: Ilse Geldhof
- Born: 9 April 1973 (age 53) Ypres, Belgium

Cycling career
- Sport: Cycling
- Role: Rider

Ilse Geldhof (born 9 April 1973) is a former Belgian racing cyclist. She won the Belgian national road race title in 2008.
