= Rosa Sels =

Belgian cyclist

Personal information
- Full name: Rosa Sels
- Born: 26 September 1943 (age 83) Vorselaar, Belgium

Cycling career
- Sport: Cycling
- Role: Rider

Rosa Sels (born 26 September 1943) is a former Belgian racing cyclist. She won the Belgian national road race title in 1960.
