= Joseph Wauters =

Belgian cyclist

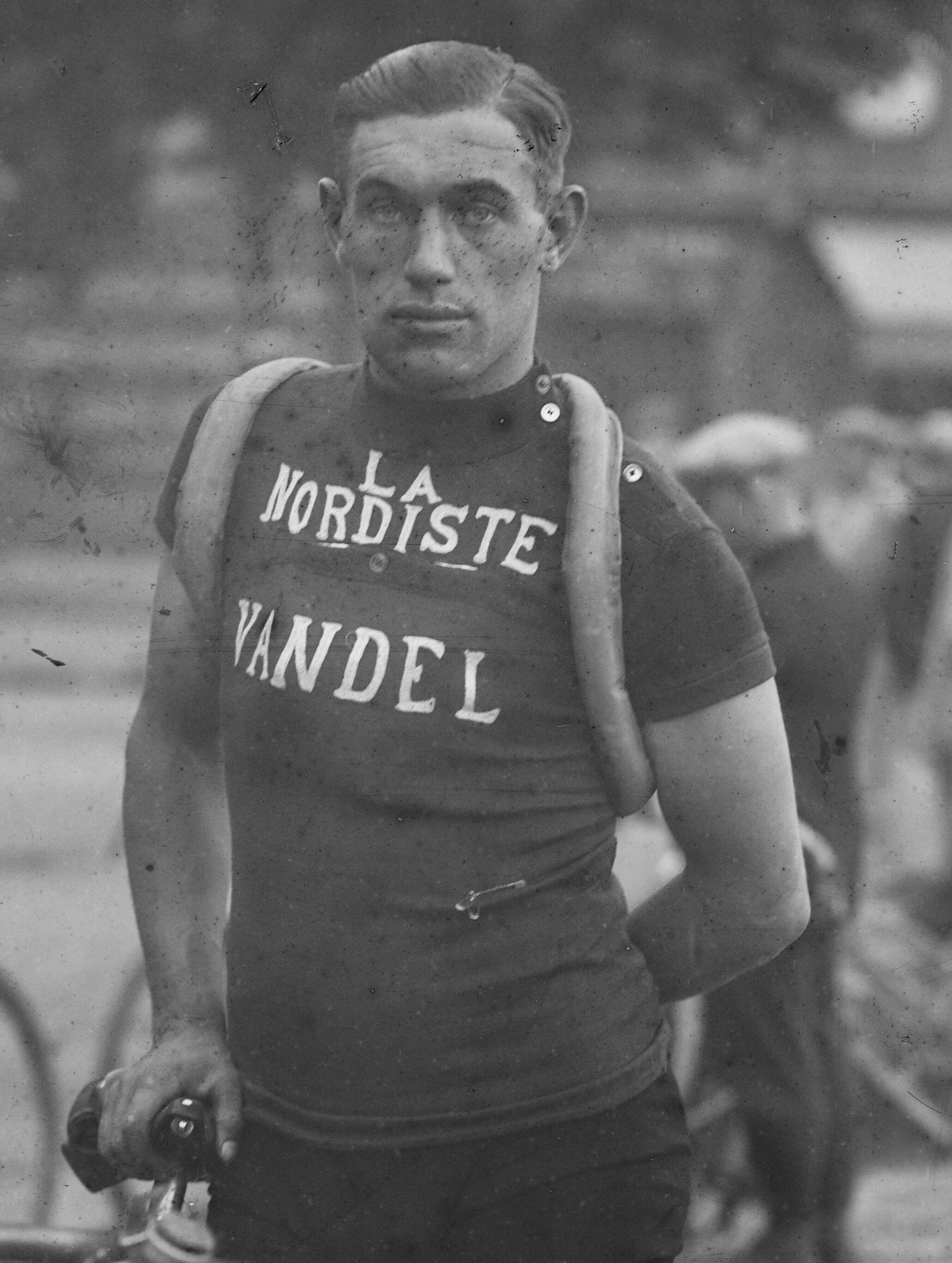
- Wauters in 1929

Personal information
- Full name: Joseph Wauters
- Born: 19 February 1906 Beersel, Belgium
- Died: 8 August 1975 (aged 69) Alsemberg, Belgium

Cycling career
- Sport: Cycling
- Role: Rider

Joseph Wauters (19 February 1906 – 8 August 1975) was a Belgian racing cyclist. He won the Belgian national road race title in 1929 and 1930.
