= Simone Ellegeest =

Belgian cyclist

Personal information
- Full name: Simone Ellegeest

Cycling career
- Sport: Cycling
- Role: Rider

Simone Ellegeest is a former Belgian racing cyclist. She finished in second place in the Belgian National Road Race Championships in 1962 and 1966.
