= Agnes Dusart =

Belgian cyclist

Personal information
- Born: 27 February 1962 (age 64) Tienen, Belgium

Cycling career
- Sport: Cycling
- Role: Rider

Agnes Dusart (born 27 February 1962) is a former Belgian racing cyclist. She won the Belgian national road race title in 1986, 1987 and 1988. She also competed in the women's road race event at the 1988 Summer Olympics.
