= Sabine Snijers =

Belgian cyclist

Personal information
- Full name: Sabine Snijers
- Born: 26 April 1970 (age 56) Hoogstraten, Belgium

Cycling career
- Sport: Cycling
- Role: Rider

Sabine Snijers (born 26 April 1970) is a former Belgian racing cyclist. She finished in second place in the Belgian National Road Race Championships in 1989 and 1992.
