= Louisa Smits =

Belgian cyclist

Personal information
- Full name: Louisa Smits

Cycling career
- Sport: Cycling
- Role: Rider

Louisa Smits is a former Belgian racing cyclist. She won the Belgian national road race title in 1965.
