= Monica Van Nassauw =

Belgian cyclist

Personal information
- Full name: Monica Van Nassauw
- Born: 7 December 1968 (age 57) Essen, Belgium

Cycling career
- Sport: Cycling
- Role: Rider

Monica Van Nassauw (born 7 December 1968) is a former Belgian racing cyclist. She finished in second place in the Belgian National Road Race Championships in 1993.
