= Petrus Van Theemsche =

Belgian cyclist

- Van Theemsche as Belgian champion in 1938

Personal information
- Full name: Petrus Van Theemsche
- Born: 15 August 1915 Lokeren, Belgium
- Died: 28 May 1999 (aged 83) Lokeren, Belgium

Cycling career
- Sport: Cycling
- Role: Rider

Petrus Van Theemsche (15 August 1915 – 28 May 1999) was a Belgian racing cyclist. He won the Belgian national road race title in 1938.
