= Francine Verlot =

Belgian cyclist

Personal information
- Full name: Francine Verlot
- Born: 2 May 1945 (age 81) Colfontaine, Belgium

Cycling career
- Sport: Cycling
- Role: Rider

Francine Verlot (born 2 May 1945) is a former Belgian racing cyclist. She finished in third place in the Belgian National Road Race Championships seven times between 1965 and 1974.
