= Nadine Fiers =

Belgian cyclist

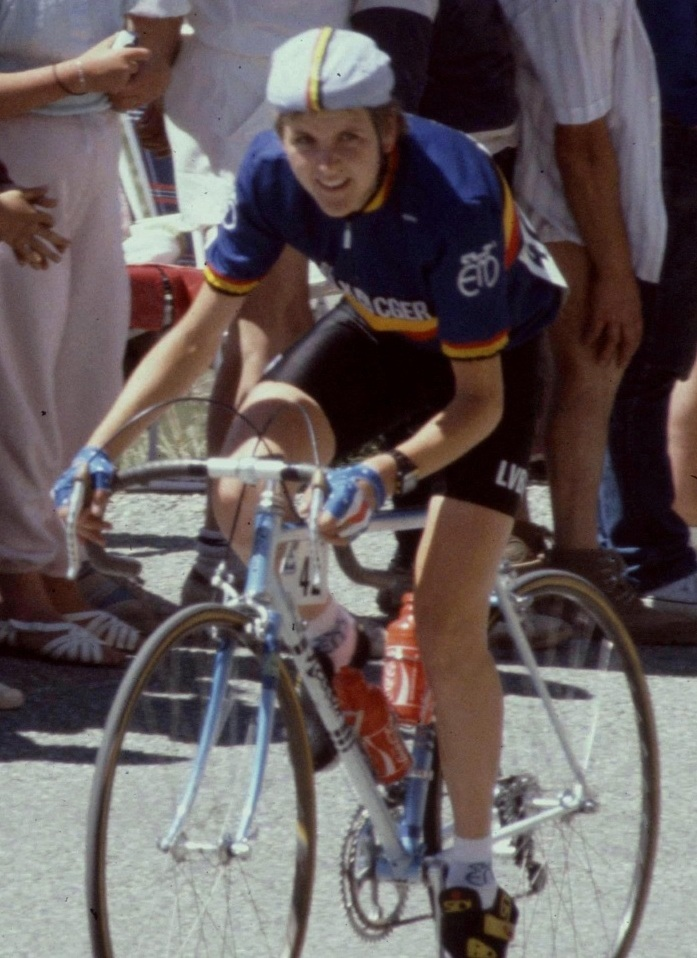
- Fiers in 1986

Personal information
- Full name: Nadine Fiers
- Born: 12 January 1966 (age 60) Ghent, Belgium

Cycling career
- Sport: Cycling
- Role: Rider

Nadine Fiers (born 12 January 1966) is a former Belgian racing cyclist. She finished in second place in the Belgian National Road Race Championships in 1985.
