= Marguerita Dams =

Belgian cyclist

Personal information
- Full name: Marguerita Dams
- Born: 5 March 1947 (age 79) Geel, Belgium

Cycling career
- Sport: Cycling
- Role: Rider

Marguerita Dams (born 5 March 1947) is a former Belgian racing cyclist. She won the Belgian national road race title in 1968.
