= Timothy Stevens =

Timothy Stevens may refer to:

- Tim Stevens (born 1946), British Anglican bishop
- Timothy Stevens (cyclist) (born 1989), Belgian cyclist
