= Victoire Van Nuffel =

Belgian cyclist

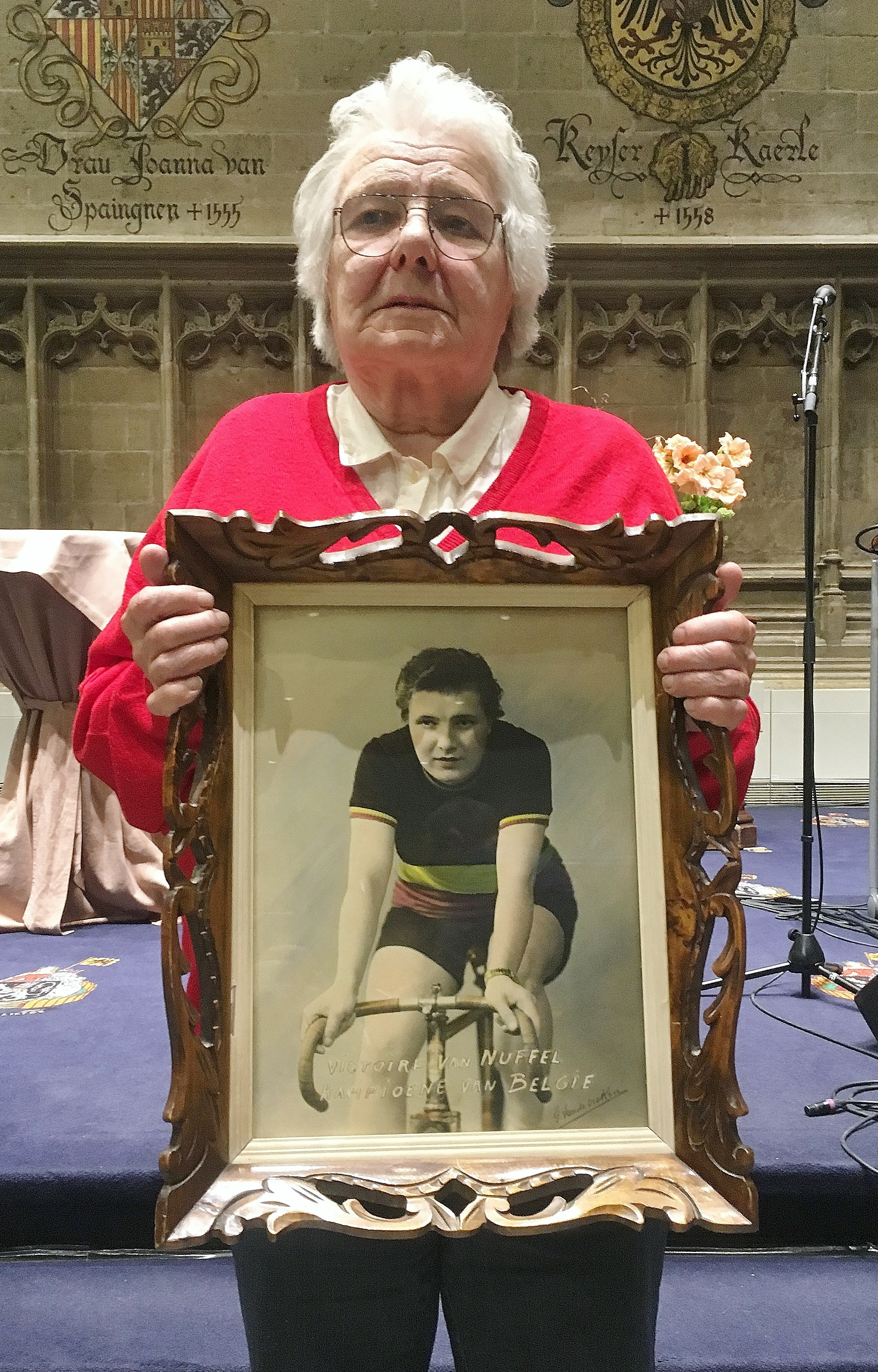

Personal information
- Full name: Victoire Van Nuffel
- Born: 7 October 1937 (age 89) Hombeek, Belgium

Cycling career
- Sport: Cycling
- Role: Rider

Victoire Van Nuffel (born 7 October 1937) is a Belgian former racing cyclist. She won the Belgian national road race title in 1959.
