= Henri Luyten =

Belgian cyclist

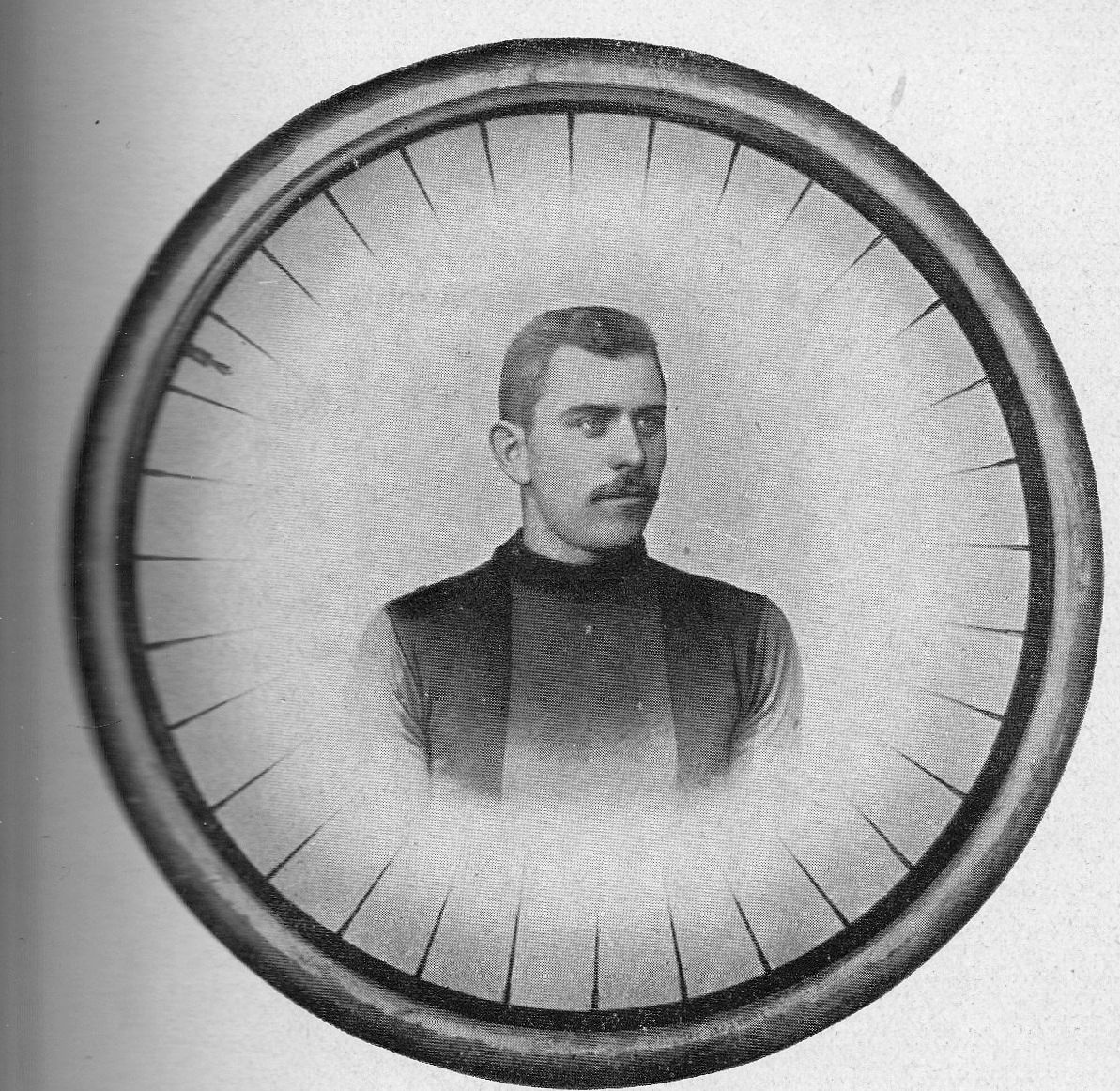

Personal information
- Full name: Henri Luyten
- Born: 1 August 1873 Koningshooikt, Belgium
- Died: 28 September 1954 (aged 81) Boechout, Belgium

Cycling career
- Sport: Cycling
- Discipline: Road
- Role: Rider

Major wins
- Belgian National Road Race Champion

Henri Luyten (1 August 1873, Koningshooikt, Belgium – 28 September 1954, Boechout, Belgium) was a Belgian champion racing cyclist who was a professional rider between 1895 and 1897.

== Palmarès ==
1894
1st Belgian National Road Race Championships – Amateur
5th World Track Championships, Stayers, Elite

1895
1st Belgian National Road Race Championships
2nd World Track Championships, Stayers, Elite

1896
1st Belgian National Road Race Championships
1st Rotterdam – Utrecht – Rotterdam
