= Lensy Debboudt =

Belgian cyclist

Personal information
- Full name: Lensy Debboudt
- Born: 20 September 1977 (age 49) Zottegem, Belgium

Cycling career
- Sport: Cycling
- Role: Rider

Lensy Debboudt (born 20 September 1977) is a Belgian racing cyclist. She finished in second place in the Belgian National Road Race Championships in 2000.
