= Christiane Goeminne =

Belgian cyclist

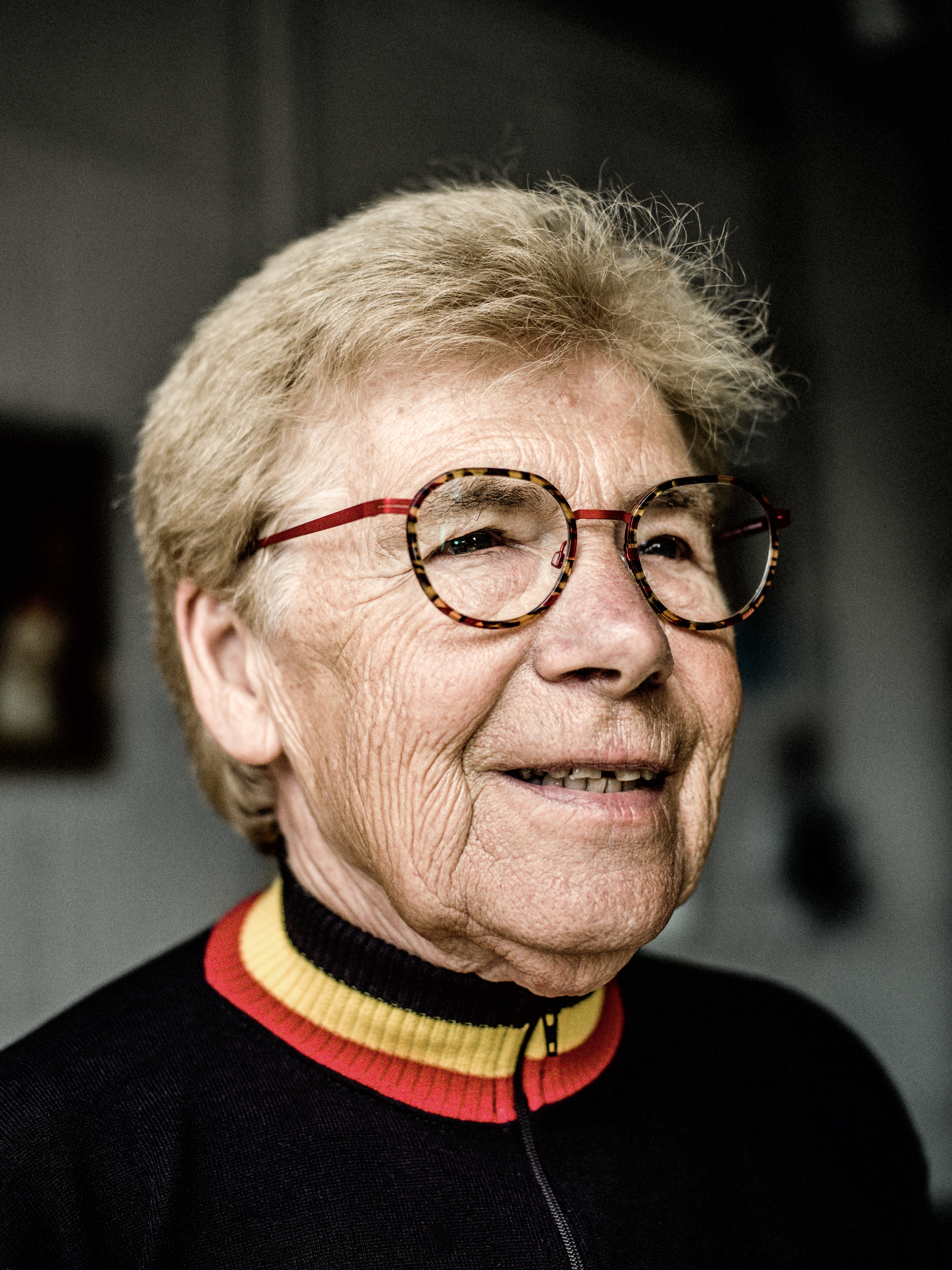
- in 2022

Personal information
- Full name: Christiane Goeminne

Cycling career
- Sport: Cycling
- Role: Rider

Christiane Goeminne is a former Belgian racing cyclist. She finished in second place in the Belgian National Road Race Championships four times between 1973 and 1978.
