= Jean-François Van Der Motte =

Belgian cyclist

Personal information
- Born: 8 December 1913 Brussels, Belgium
- Died: 8 October 2007 (aged 93) Mont-de-l'Enclus, Belgium

Cycling career
- Sport: Cycling
Medal record
Representing BEL
Men's cycling
Olympic Games
Bronze medal – third place	1936 Berlin	Team road race

Jean-François Van Der Motte (8 December 1913 – 8 October 2007) was a cyclist from Belgium. He won a bronze medal in the team road race at the 1936 Summer Olympics along with Auguste Garrebeek and Armand Putzeyse.
