= Gerda Sierens =

Belgian cyclist

Personal information
- Full name: Gerda Sierens
- Born: 28 July 1961 (age 65) Eeklo, Belgium

Cycling career
- Sport: Cycling
- Role: Rider

Gerda Sierens (born 28 July 1961) is a former Belgian racing cyclist. She won the Belgian national road race title in 1981.
