= Jean Chaerels =

Belgian cyclist

Julien Chaerels
Personal information
- Born: 26 May 1908 Brussels, Belgium

Cycling career
- Sport: Cycling

Julien Chaerels (born 26 May 1908) was a Belgian cyclist. He competed in the individual and team road race events at the 1928 Summer Olympics.
