= Henri Bertrand (cyclist) =

Belgian cyclist

Personal information
- Full name: Henri Bertrand
- Born: Charleroi, Belgium

Cycling career
- Sport: Cycling
- Role: Rider

Henri Bertrand was a Belgian racing cyclist. He won the Belgian national road race title in 1897 and 1898.
