= Johanna Bosmans =

Belgian cyclist

Personal information
- Full name: Johanna Bosmans

Cycling career
- Sport: Cycling
- Role: Rider

Johanna Bosmans is a former Belgian racing cyclist. She finished in third place in the Belgian National Road Race Championships in 1975.
