= Geert Van de Walle =

Belgian cyclist

Geert Vandewalle (6 December 1964 – 26 November 1988) was a Belgian cyclist. He was Belgian amateur champion in 1985, whereupon he immediately signed a contract with the Lotto team for whom he rode in 1986 and 1987. In 1988, he switched to Isoglass-Robland.

== Doping ==
His death was noted by Willy Voet in his book Massacre à la chaîne although he acknowledged the impossibility of proving the link between these early deaths and the drugs taken while racing.

== See also ==
- List of doping cases in cycling
