= Jules Defrance =

Belgian cyclist

Personal information
- Full name: Jules Defrance

Cycling career
- Sport: Cycling
- Role: Rider

Jules Defrance was a Belgian racing cyclist. He won the Belgian national road race title in 1902.
