= Pierre Houdé =

Belgian cyclist

Personal information
- Full name: Pierre Houdé
- Born: 4 April 1902 Brussels, Belgium

Cycling career
- Sport: Cycling

Pierre Houdé (born 4 April 1902) was a Belgian cyclist. He competed in the individual and team road race events at the 1928 Summer Olympics.
