= Sonja Vermeylen =

Belgian cyclist

Personal information
- Full name: Sonja Vermeylen
- Born: 17 April 1964 (age 62) Vilvoorde, Belgium

Cycling career
- Sport: Cycling
- Role: Rider

Sonja Vermeylen (born 17 April 1964) is a former Belgian racing cyclist. She won the Belgian national road race title in 1996 and 1997.
