= Dieudonné Jamar =

Belgian cyclist

Personal information
- Full name: Dieudonné Jamar
- Born: 6 November 1878 Liège, Belgium

Cycling career
- Sport: Cycling
- Role: Rider

Dieudonné Jamar (born 6 November 1878, date of death unknown) was a Belgian racing cyclist. He won the Belgian national road race title in 1905.
