= André Bosman =

Dutch politician (born 1965)

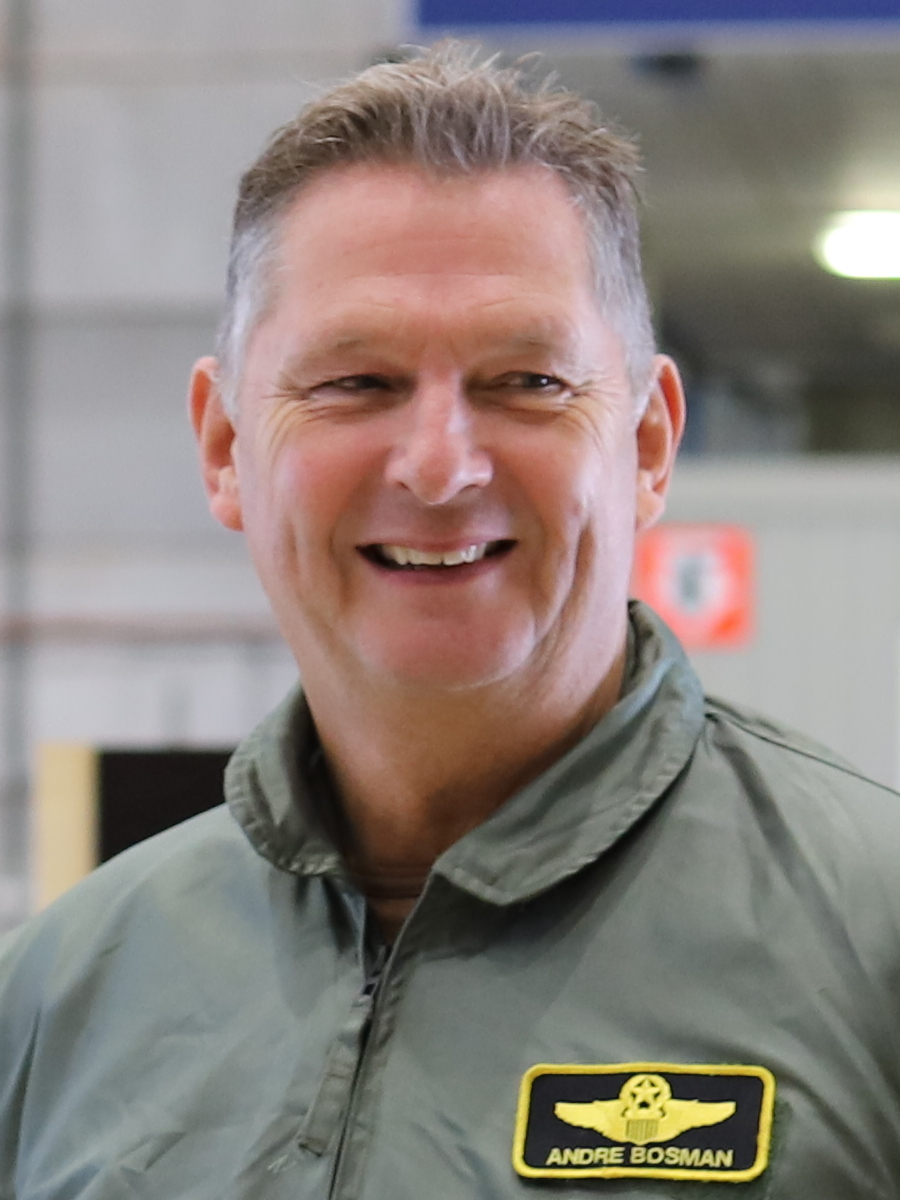
- Bosman in 2020

Member of the House of Representatives
- In office 17 June 2010 – 31 March 2021

Personal details
- Born: 20 January 1965 (age 61) Maarn, Netherlands
- Party: People's Party for Freedom and Democracy
- Occupation: Politician

André Bosman (born 20 January 1965) is a Dutch politician and former officer, flight instructor and aviator. As a member of the People's Party for Freedom and Democracy, he served as a member of the House of Representatives from 17 June 2010 until 31 March 2021. He focused on matters of the Dutch defence and Kingdom relations.

Among others he was liaison officer at ISAF headquarters in Kabul in 2006.
