= Elias Van Breussegem =

Belgian cyclist

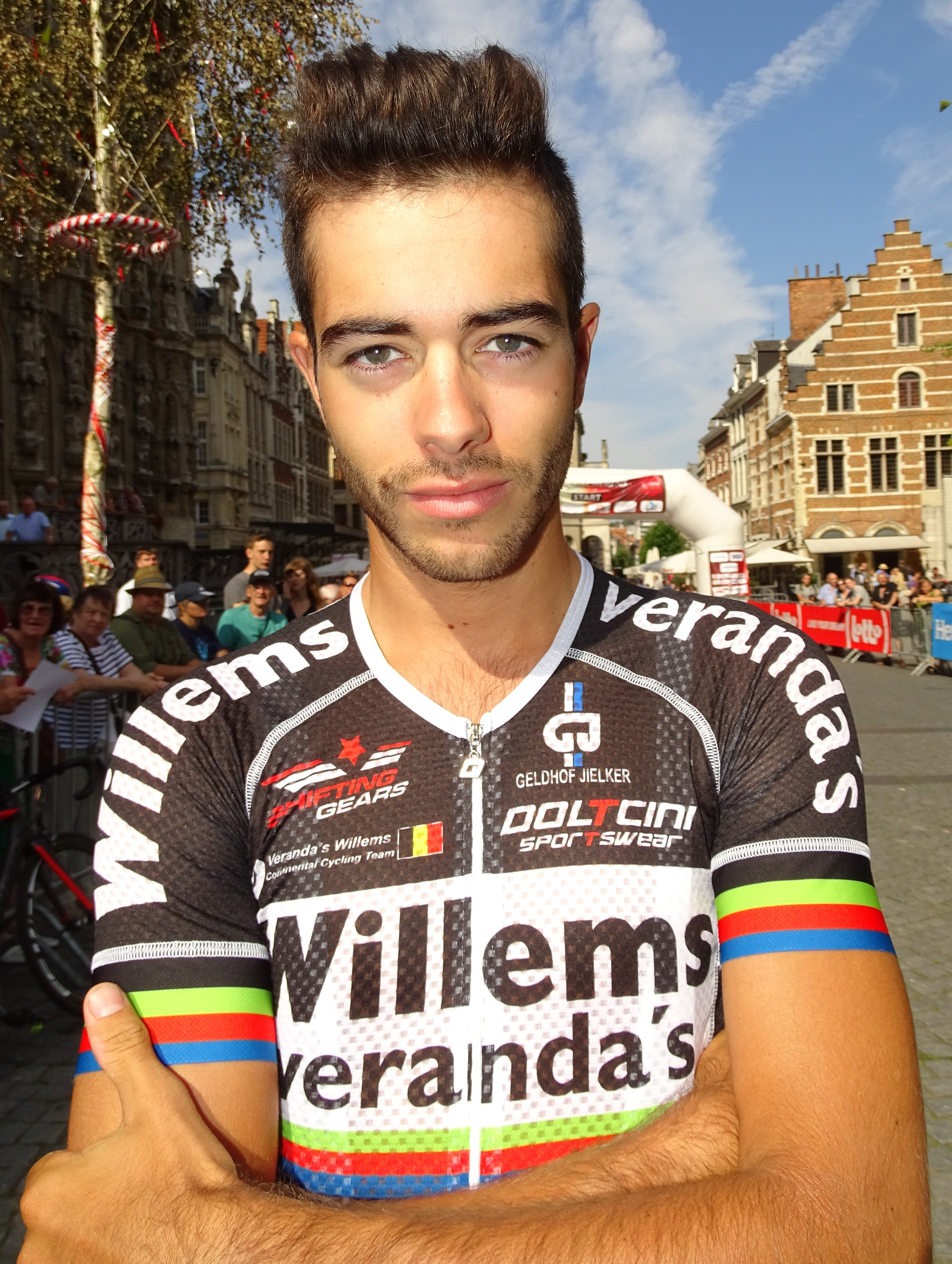
- Van Breussegem in 2015

Personal information
- Full name: Elias Van Breussegem
- Born: 10 April 1992 (age 34) Oudenaarde, Belgium
- Height: 1.79 m (5 ft 10 in)
- Weight: 70 kg (154 lb)

Cycling career
- Sport: Cycling
- Current team: Shifting Gears
- Discipline: Road
- Role: Rider

Amateur teams
- 2011–2012: BCV Works Ingelmunster
- 2013: Baguet Bicycle Center–MIBA Poorten
- 2014: VL Technics–Abutriek
- 2023–: Shifting Gears

Professional teams
- 2013: Doltcini Flanders
- 2015–2018: Verandas Willems
- 2019–2022: Tarteletto–Isorex

Elias Van Breussegem (born 10 April 1992) is a Belgian cyclist, who currently rides for Belgian amateur team Shifting Gears.

== Major results ==
2013
8th Memorial Philippe Van Coningsloo
2014
1st Time trial, National Under-23 Road Championships
2015
1st Stage 1 (TTT) Ronde van Midden-Nederland
4th Grote Prijs Stad Zottegem
2016
1st Omloop Het Nieuwsblad U23
7th Overall Le Triptyque des Monts et Châteaux
9th Duo Normand (with Christophe Prémont)
2021
1st Dorpenomloop Rucphen
2022
4th Stadsprijs Geraardsbergen
2023
1st Grote Prijs Koen Barbé
1st Zele
1st GP du Bourgmestre d'Estaimpuis
1st Veldegem
1st Moerbeke - Geraardsbergen
1st Grote Prijs Maleizen
1st Stenenmuur Sinaai
