= Anna Callebaut =

Belgian cyclist

Personal information
- Full name: Anna Callebaut
- Born: 11 August 1962 (age 64) Aalst, Belgium

Cycling career
- Sport: Cycling
- Role: Rider

Anna Callebaut (born 11 August 1962) is a former Belgian racing cyclist. She finished in third place in the Belgian National Road Race Championships in 1982 and 1983.
