= Frank Pattyn =

Belgian glaciologist

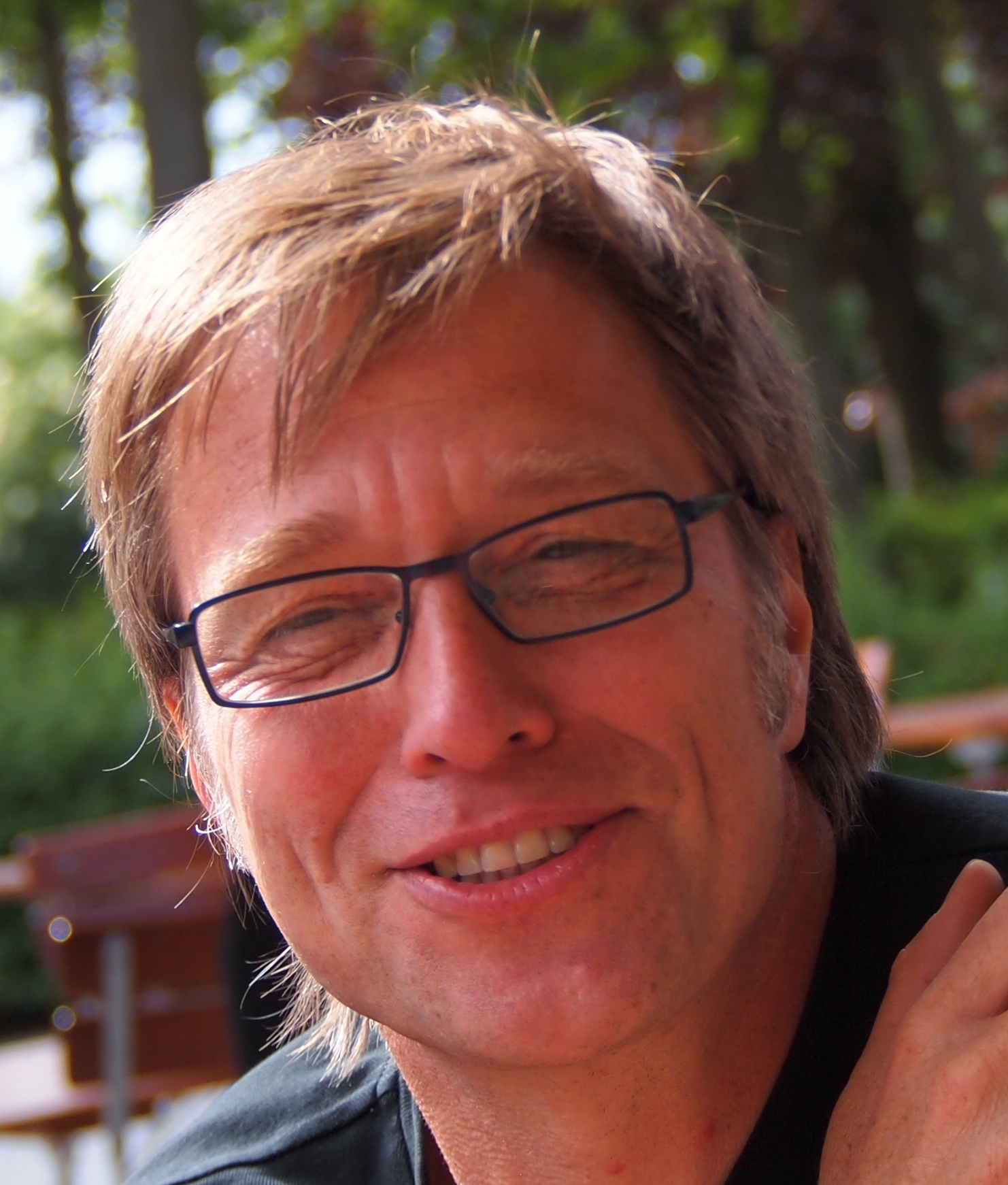
- Born: 4 March 1966 (age 60)
- Education: Vrije Universiteit Brussel
- Scientific career
- Fields: glaciology; Ice sheet Modelling; Model intercomparison; Antarctica
- Workplaces: Université libre de Bruxelles
- Website: http://homepages.ulb.ac.be/~fpattyn/

Frank Jean-Marie Léon Pattyn is a Belgian glaciologist and professor at the Université libre de Bruxelles. He is best known for developing ice-sheet model and leading model intercomparisons.

== Early life and education ==
Frank Pattyn was born in Etterbeek on 4 March 1966. He completed his Bachelor and Master degrees in geography at the Vrije Universiteit Brussel in 1986 and 1988, respectively. After a short period of military service in the Belgian Armed Forces, he then obtained his PhD from the same institution in 1998.

== Career and impact ==
After completing his PhD, Pattyn then worked as a postdoctoral researcher at the National Institute of Polar Research, Tokyo, Japan (1999-2000) before coming back to Belgium as a research associate at the Vrije Universiteit Brussel.

In 2000, he started to teach geomorphology and climatology at the Université libre de Bruxelles where he became a professor in 2011. Since 2006, he has also become co-director of the Laboratoire de Glaciologie of the Université libre de Bruxelles.

He is currently Chairman of the Belgian National Committee on Antarctic Research, the Belgian branch of the Scientific Committee on Antarctic Research and the vice-president of the International Glaciological Society and Associate Chief Editor of Journal of Glaciology.

Pattyn has authored over 70 peer-review papers (including 6 from high-profile journals) covering various aspect of glaciology, which are cited over 1700 times.

His research includes ice-sheet modelling with in situ and remote sensing observations, to evaluate the present-day and future mass changes of the Antarctic ice sheet. He has developed several ice-sheet models, such as a three-dimensional thermomechanical ice-sheet model including higher-order stress gradients (Blatter-Pattyn model), and more recently the fast Elementary Thermomechanical Ice Sheet model (f.ETISh). Such models are capable of simulating the behaviour of fast-flowing ice streams and ice flow across subglacial lakes, and over long time scales.

He is also actively involved in a series of Ice-Sheet Model Intercomparison Projects (ISMIP), such as ISMIP-HOM, ISMIP-HEINO, MISMIP, MISMIP3D, and MISMIP+.

He took part in 19 expeditions to Antarctica and Arctic glaciers in order to study the interaction of glaciers and ice sheets with subglacial water and the ocean, using ground-penetrating radar and differential GPS.

Since taking office as a professor, he has also paid attention to the outreach of glaciology. In particular, he developed the Grantism model, which allows to simulate the evolution of the Greenland and the Antarctic according to parameters understandable to all (temperature, sea level). He recently set up the Tweeting ice shelf, a project which consists of two GPS placed on the Roi Baudouin Ice Shelf, East Antarctica that communicate their position and movement via Twitter.

== Awards and honours ==
Pattyn has received the 2018 Louis Agassiz Medal, an award from the European Geosciences Union that recognises his outstanding scientific contribution to the study of the cryosphere.

== Selected work ==
- Pattyn, Frank (2017). "Sea-level response to melting of Antarctic ice shelves on multi-centennial timescales with the fast Elementary Thermomechanical Ice Sheet model (f.ETISh v1.0)". The Cryosphere. 11 (4): 1851–1878. Bibcode:2017TCry...11.1851P. doi:10.5194/tc-11-1851-2017. hdl:2013/ULB-DIPOT:oai:dipot.ulb.ac.be:2013/259183.
- Hanna, Edward; Navarro, Francisco J.; Pattyn, Frank; Domingues, Catia M.; Fettweis, Xavier; Ivins, Erik R.; Nicholls, Robert J.; Ritz, Catherine; Smith, Ben; Tulaczyk, Slawek; Whitehouse, Pippa L.; Zwally, H. Jay (2013). "Ice-sheet mass balance and climate change" (PDF). Nature. 498 (7452): 51–59. Bibcode:2013Natur.498...51H. doi:10.1038/nature12238. PMID 23739423. S2CID 205234225.
- Pattyn, Frank; Perichon, Laura; Durand, Gaël; Favier, Lionel; Gagliardini, Olivier; Hindmarsh, Richard C.A.; Zwinger, Thomas; Albrecht, Torsten; Cornford, Stephen; Docquier, David; Fürst, Johannes J.; Goldberg, Daniel; Gudmundsson, G. Hilmar; Humbert, Angelika; Hütten, Moritz; Huybrechts, Philippe; Jouvet, Guillaume; Kleiner, Thomas; Larour, Eric; Martin, Daniel; Morlighem, Mathieu; Payne, Anthony J.; Pollard, David; Rückamp, Martin; Rybak, Oleg; Seroussi, Hélène; Thoma, Malte; Wilkens, Nina (2013). "Grounding-line migration in plan-view marine ice-sheet models: Results of the ice2sea MISMIP3d intercomparison". Journal of Glaciology. 59 (215): 410–422. Bibcode:2013JGlac..59..410P. doi:10.3189/2013JoG12J129. hdl:2078/167218.
- Pattyn, F.; Schoof, C.; Perichon, L.; Hindmarsh, R. C. A.; Bueler, E.; De Fleurian, B.; Durand, G.; Gagliardini, O.; Gladstone, R.; Goldberg, D.; Gudmundsson, G. H.; Huybrechts, P.; Lee, V.; Nick, F. M.; Payne, A. J.; Pollard, D.; Rybak, O.; Saito, F.; Vieli, A. (2012). "Results of the Marine Ice Sheet Model Intercomparison Project, MISMIP". The Cryosphere. 6 (3): 573–588. Bibcode:2012TCry....6..573P. doi:10.5194/tc-6-573-2012. hdl:20.500.11820/a395c1d4-d221-4ac4-b0c9-37c3ea3f2b98.
- Pattyn, Frank (2010). "Antarctic subglacial conditions inferred from a hybrid ice sheet/ice stream model". Earth and Planetary Science Letters. 295 (3–4): 451–461. Bibcode:2010E&PSL.295..451P. doi:10.1016/j.epsl.2010.04.025.
- Pattyn, Frank (2006). "GRANTISM: An Excel model for Greenland and Antarctic ice-sheet response to climate changes". Computers & Geosciences. 32 (3): 316–325. Bibcode:2006CG.....32..316P. doi:10.1016/j.cageo.2005.06.020.
- Pattyn, Frank (2003). "A new three-dimensional higher-order thermomechanical ice sheet model: Basic sensitivity, ice stream development, and ice flow across subglacial lakes". Journal of Geophysical Research: Solid Earth. 108 (B8): 2382. Bibcode:2003JGRB..108.2382P. doi:10.1029/2002JB002329.
