= Josiane Vanhuysse =

Belgian cyclist

Personal information
- Full name: Josiane Vanhuysse
- Born: 10 January 1953 (age 73) Wervik, Belgium

Cycling career
- Sport: Cycling
- Role: Rider

Josiane Vanhuysse (born 10 January 1953) is a former Belgian racing cyclist. She won the Belgian national road race title in 1985, as well as a stage in the 1985 Tour de France Féminine.
