= Armand Putzeyse =

Belgian cyclist

Personal information
- Born: 30 November 1916 Engis, Belgium
- Died: 21 November 2003 (aged 86) Molenbeek-Saint-Jean, Belgium

Cycling career
- Sport: Cycling
Medal record
Representing BEL
Men's cycling
Olympic Games
Bronze medal – third place	1936 Berlin	Team road race

Armand Putzeyse also spelt Putzeys(30 November 1916 – 21 November 2003) was a cyclist from Belgium. He won the bronze medal in the team road race at the 1936 Summer Olympics along with Auguste Garrebeek and François Vandermotte.
