= Fred Bosman =

Dutch pathologist

Frederik Theodoor "Fred" Bosman (born 1944) is a Dutch pathologist. He served as director of the Institute of Pathology at the Lausanne University Hospital between 1995 and 2009. He previously was professor and chair of the pathology departments of Maastricht University and the Erasmus University Rotterdam.

== Career ==
Bosman was born in 1944. He studied medicine at Leiden University and obtained his degree in 1971. He subsequently obtained his PhD in 1976 there as well, studying cytogenetics.

From 1974 to 1975 Bosman was a lecturer at the Anton de Kom University of Suriname. He then returned to the Netherlands to become staff pathologist at Leiden University. He kept this position until 1981. Bosman subsequently became professor and chair of the pathology department of Maastricht University. In 1990 he moved to Erasmus University Rotterdam where he held similar positions until 1995. Bosman once more went abroad, this time to become Director of the University Institute of Pathology and Professor of Pathology at Lausanne University Hospital. He retired in 2009.

After a long time as a generalist, Bosman's research has later focused on gastroestinental pathology, with his most recent research being in the field of colorectal cancer. In his research Bosman also tried to combine experimental and diagnostic pathology. Bosman was ranked number 6 by The Pathologist in their 2015 Power List.

Bosman was elected a corresponding member of the Royal Netherlands Academy of Arts and Sciences in 2004. He is an honorary fellow of the Royal College of Pathologists.
