= Mandy Jones (cyclist) =

British former racing cyclist (born 1962)

Personal information
- Full name: Amanda Ellen Jones
- Born: 1962 (age 63–64) England; Great Britain

Cycling career
- Sport: Cycling
- Discipline: Road
- Role: Rider

Amateur teams
- West Pennine Road Club
- GS Surosa

Major wins
- UCI Road World Championships Road Race (1982)
Medal record
Representing Great Britain
Women's Road bicycle racing
World Championships
Gold medal – first place	1982 Goodwood	Road race
Bronze medal – third place	1980 Sallanches	Road race

Amanda Ellen "Mandy" Jones is a British former racing cyclist born in 1962 who won the women's world road race championship in 1982.

== Biography ==
Jones joined the West Pennine Road Club to ride on Sunday outings. She rode her first race in 1974 and five years later tied with Julie Earnshaw for first place in the national junior 10-mile time trial championship. They recorded 25m 42s.

The experience persuaded her to race seriously. She rode the world road race championship for Britain in 1980, when she was 18, and took the bronze medal behind the American Beth Heiden on a tough circuit at Sallanches, in the French Alps.

The Golden Book of Cycling, which she signed when she was 29, said: "Her potential was evident: Britain had a new star in the making."

She won the national 3,000m individual pursuit championship at Leicester in 1982, broke the world 5,000 metres record on the same track in the same year, and became national 50-mile time-trial champion.

Riding the world championship road race in Goodwood, Sussex, England that year, she broke clear of the field to win by 10 seconds. She was the first British woman to win a world championship for 15 years. She said:

"I won by accident. It was just plain daft. We were going downhill and I just rode past them. Then I looked back, saw I had a gap and kept going. I was praying my legs wouldn't collapse. But with around half a lap to go, I started thinking 'Hey, I could win this!"

She was, said the Golden Book of Cycling, "the perfect example of how a youngster, while enjoying the companionship and adventure of club runs, can successfully aspire to becoming a world champion by self-dedication and encouragement."

She ran cycle shop Surosa Cycles in Oldham, Greater Manchester with her husband until January 2015.

In 2009, she was inducted into the British Cycling Hall of Fame.
