= Auguste Garrebeek =

Belgian cyclist

Personal information
- Born: 10 January 1912 Dworp, Belgium
- Died: 20 October 1973 (aged 61) Asse, Belgium

Cycling career
- Sport: Cycling
Medal record
Men's cycling
Representing BEL
Olympic Games
Bronze medal – third place	1936 Berlin	Team road race

Auguste Garrebeek (10 January 1912 – 20 October 1973) was a cyclist from Belgium. He won the bronze medal in the team road race at the 1936 Summer Olympics along with Armand Putzeyse and François Vandermotte.
