= Marie-Hélène Schiffers =

Belgian cyclist

Personal information
- Full name: Marie-Hélène Schiffers

Cycling career
- Sport: Cycling
- Role: Rider

Marie-Hélène Schiffers is a former Belgian racing cyclist. She finished in third place in the Belgian National Road Race Championships in 1979.
