= Jenny De Smet =

Belgian cyclist

Personal information
- Full name: Jenny De Smet
- Born: 3 July 1958 (age 68) Hamme, Belgium

Cycling career
- Sport: Cycling
- Role: Rider

Jenny De Smet (born 3 July 1958) is a former Belgian racing cyclist. She won the Belgian national road race title in 1982.
