= Joeri Calleeuw =

Belgian cyclist

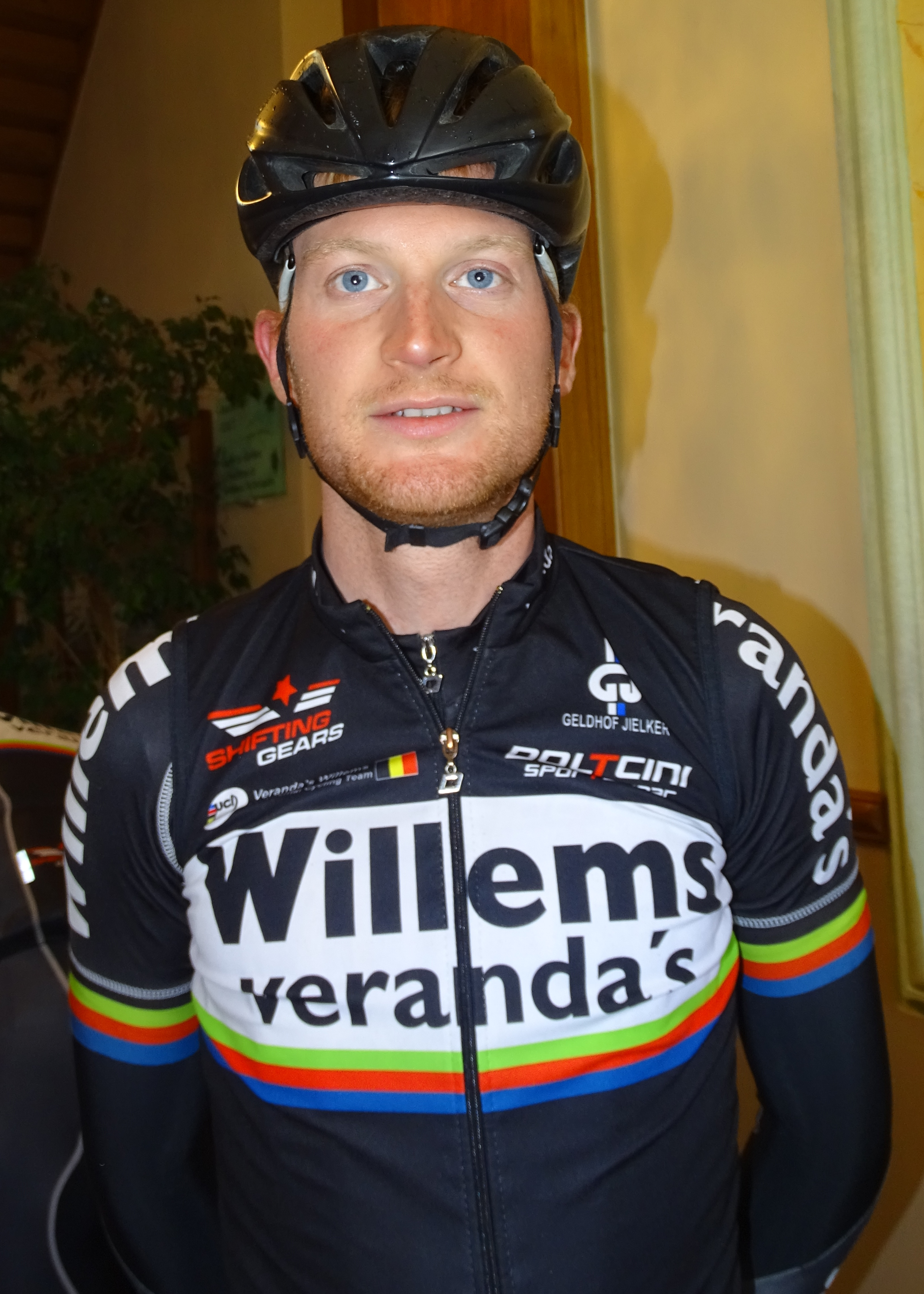
- Calleeuw in 2015

Personal information
- Born: 5 August 1985 (age 41) Bruges, Belgium
- Height: 1.83 m (6 ft 0 in)
- Weight: 71 kg (157 lb)

Cycling career
- Sport: Cycling
- Discipline: Road
- Role: Rider

Amateur teams
- 2011–2012: BCV Works Ingelmunster
- 2014: Geldhof Jielker
- 2018: Shifting Gears–Geldhof Jielker
- 2019–2020: Wielerteam Decock–Van Eyck–Devos–Capoen

Professional teams
- 2009–2010: Jong Vlaanderen–Bauknecht
- 2013: Ventilair–Steria Cycling Team
- 2015–2016: Verandas Willems
- 2017: Roubaix–Lille Métropole

Joeri Calleeuw (born 5 August 1985) is a Belgian cyclist, who last rode for amateur team Wielerteam Decock–Van Eyck–Devos–Capoen.

== Major results ==
2008
1st Overall Tour du Sénégal

1st Young rider classification
1st Stages 5 & 6

4th Ronde van Midden-Nederland
9th Flèche Ardennaise
2009
1st Overall Ronde van Antwerpen

1st Stage 1

7th Nationale Sluitingsprijs
2010
6th Omloop Het Nieuwsblad Beloften
7th Flèche Ardennaise
9th Kattekoers
10th Grand Prix de la ville de Pérenchies
2011
5th Kattekoers
5th Flèche Ardennaise
5th Omloop Het Nieuwsblad Beloften
2012
1st Stage 4 Tour of Madagascar
7th Flèche Ardennaise
8th Omloop Het Nieuwsblad Beloften
10th Overall Tour du Faso
2014
1st Ghent–Staden
1st Beselare–Zonnebeke
1st Grand Prix de la ville de Geluwe
Ronde van Namen

1st Stages 3 & 5

2015
1st Overall Paris–Arras Tour

1st Stage 1 (TTT)

2nd Kattekoers
2nd Grand Prix de la ville de Pérenchies
4th Overall Ronde van Midden-Nederland

1st Stage 1 (TTT)

6th Overall Circuit des Ardennes
7th Circuit de Wallonie
2016
7th Tour de l'Eurométropole
2017
9th Overall Paris–Arras Tour
2018
1st Stage 6 (TTT) Tour du Faso
