= Marleen Clemminck =

Belgian cyclist (born 1958)

Personal information
- Full name: Marleen Clemminck
- Born: 2 December 1958 (age 67) Assenede, Belgium

Cycling career
- Sport: Cycling
- Role: Rider

Marleen Clemminck (born 2 December 1958) is a Belgian former racing cyclist. She finished in third place in the Belgian National Road Race Championships in 1985.
