= Emile De Beukelaer =

Belgian cyclist

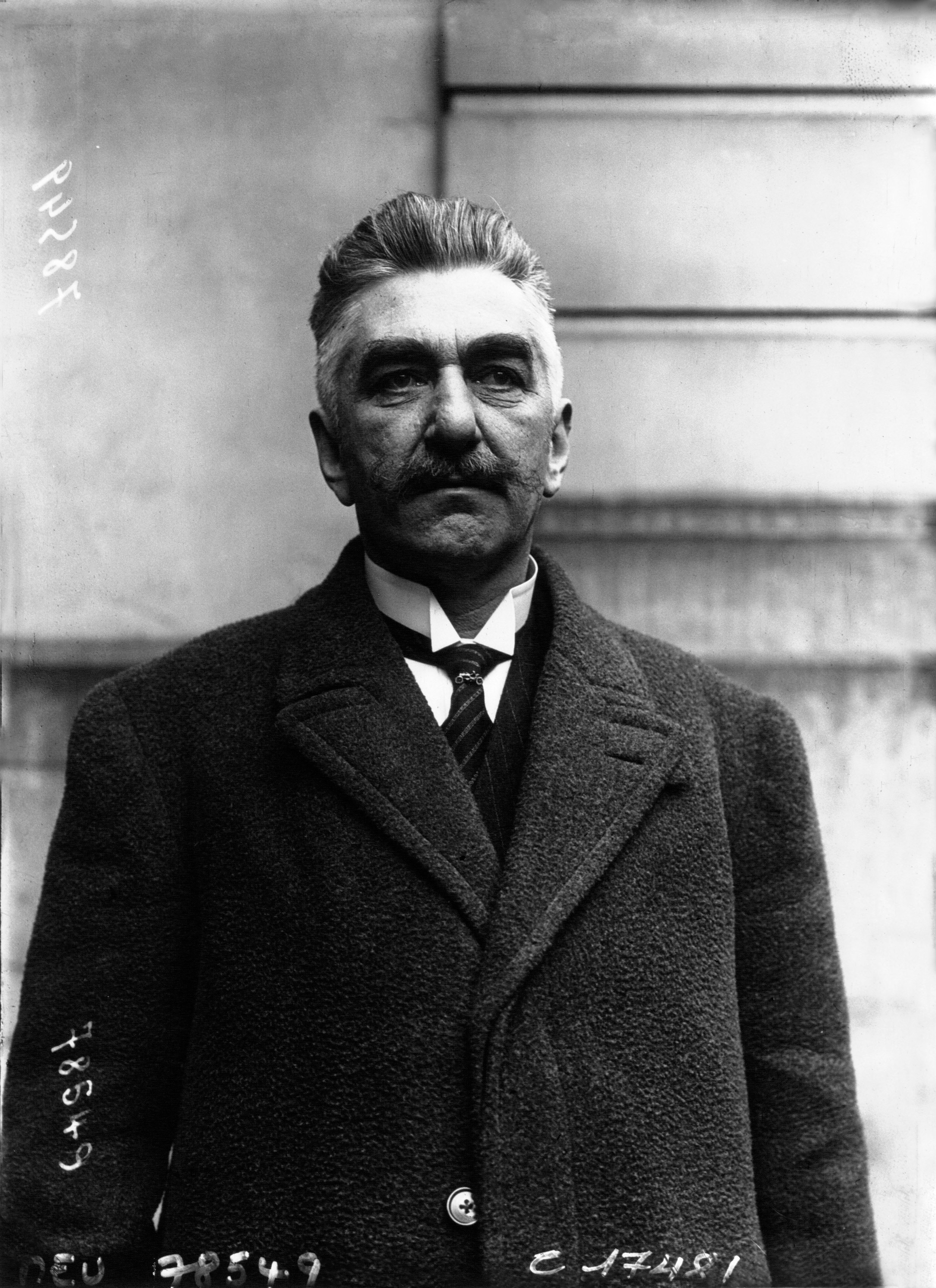
- De Beukelaer in 1920

Personal information
- Full name: Emile De Beukelaer
- Born: 27 May 1867
- Died: 23 January 1922 (aged 54)

Cycling career
- Sport: Cycling
- Discipline: Road
- Role: Individual

Emile De Beukelaer (27 May 1867–23 January 1922) was a Belgian road racing cyclist, and the founder and President of the Union Cycliste Internationale (UCI). He was the son of the founder of Elixir d'Anvers, a famous liquor from the Antwerp region.

== Career ==
=== Cycling career ===
He was the most successful cyclist of the 1880s.

=== Foundation of UCI ===
On 14 April 1900, delegates from six associations and five countries assembled in Paris to form the "Union Cycliste Internationale". The delegates were:

- Emile De Beukelaer for the "Ligue Velocipédique Belge"
- Frenchman Victor Breyer for the "National Cycling Association" in the United States
- Alfred Riguelle for the "Union velocipédique de France"
- Count Villers for the "Union des Sociétés Françaises de Sports Athlétiques"
- Mario Bruzzone representing the "Unione Velocipedistica Italiana"
- Frenchman Paul Rousseau for the "Union Cycliste Suisse"

Paul Rousseau became the Secretary General, while Emile De Beukelaer became the President, and served as such until his death in 1922.
