= Belgian National Time Trial Championships =

Annual cycling race

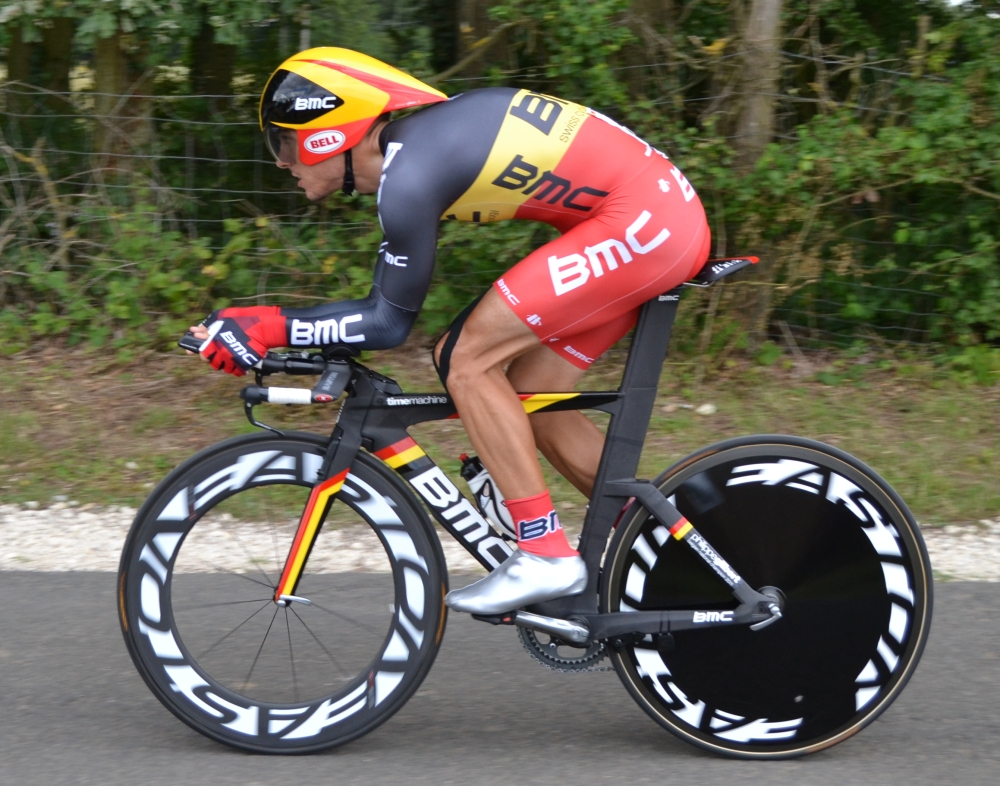
2011 champion Philippe Gilbert wearing the champion's jersey during the 2012 Tour de France

The Champion's Jersey

The Belgian National Time Trial Championships are held annually as part of the Belgian National Cycling Championships, deciding the national champion in this discipline for the year to come. The national time trial championship in Belgium is a relatively new competition, especially when compared to the Belgium National Road Race Championship, which was first held in 1894.

The first winner of the men's elite time trial championships was Marc Streel in 1997. The race was not held the following year, and Marc Streel retained his title in 1999. In 2000 the Rik Verbrugghe was crowned champion, who holds the record for the fastest average speed in a time trial race in a Grand Tour, which he achieved by winning the 2001 Giro d'Italia prologue. Marc Wauters, Leif Hoste, Kristof Vandewalle and Wout van Aert hold the record for most wins in the championships, with three wins apiece.

The winners of each event are awarded with a symbolic cycling jersey which is black yellow and red, like the national flag. These colours can be worn by the rider at other time trialling events to show their status as national champion. The champion's stripes can be combined into a sponsored rider's team kit design for this purpose.

== Men ==
=== Elite ===
Year	Gold	Silver	Bronze
1997	Marc Streel	Johan Museeuw	Bert Roesems
1998	Not held		
1999	Marc Streel (2)	Bert Roesems	Thierry Marichal
2000	Rik Verbrugghe	Marc Streel	Leif Hoste
2001	Leif Hoste	Bert Roesems	Glenn D'Hollander
2002	Marc Wauters	Bert Roesems	Ludo Dierckxsens
2003	Marc Wauters (2)	Jurgen Van den Broeck	Bert Roesems
2004	Bert Roesems	Marc Wauters	Leif Hoste
2005	Marc Wauters (3)	Bert Roesems	Frank Vandenbroucke
2006	Leif Hoste (2)	Bert Roesems	Marc Wauters
2007	Leif Hoste (3)	Philippe Gilbert	Jurgen Van den Broeck
2008	Stijn Devolder	Leif Hoste	Dominique Cornu
2009	Maxime Monfort	Sébastien Rosseler	Dominique Cornu
2010	Stijn Devolder (2)	Sébastien Rosseler	Leif Hoste
2011	Philippe Gilbert	Ben Hermans	Dominique Cornu
2012	Kristof Vandewalle	Ben Hermans	Philippe Gilbert
2013	Kristof Vandewalle (2)	Philippe Gilbert	Julien Vermote
2014	Kristof Vandewalle (3)	Tim Wellens	Pieter Serry
2015	Jurgen Van den Broeck	Yves Lampaert	Kristof Vandewalle
2016	Victor Campenaerts	Yves Lampaert	Ben Hermans
2017	Yves Lampaert	Victor Campenaerts	Ben Hermans
2018	Victor Campenaerts (2)	Thomas De Gendt	Yves Lampaert
2019	Wout van Aert	Yves Lampaert	Remco Evenepoel
2020	Wout van Aert (2)	Victor Campenaerts	Frederik Frison
2021	Yves Lampaert (2)	Remco Evenepoel	Victor Campenaerts
2022	Remco Evenepoel	Yves Lampaert	Victor Campenaerts
2023	Wout van Aert (3)	Alec Segaert	Rune Herregodts
2024	Tim Wellens	Alec Segaert	Rune Herregodts
2025	Remco Evenepoel (2)	Florian Vermeersch	Alec Segaert
2026	Alec Segaert	Tim Wellens	Vlad Van Mechelen

=== Under 23 ===
Year	Gold	Silver	Bronze
1997	Marc Chanoine	Stijn De Peuter	Laurent Caps
1998	Davy Daniels	Wesley Huvaere	Steven Van Olmen
1999	Jan Kuyckx	Gert Steegmans	Kurt Geysen
2000	Jurgen Van Goolen	Stijn Devolder	Kevin van Impe
2001	Jurgen Van Goolen	Gert Steegmans	Sébastien Rosseler
2002	Gert Steegmans	Sébastien Rosseler	Olivier Kaisen
2003	Olivier Kaisen	Jurgen Van den Broeck	Stefan Wijnands
2004	Dominique Cornu	Mario Ickx	Olivier Kaisen
2005	Dominique Cornu	Bart Vanheule	Francis De Greef
2006	Dominique Cornu	Mario Ickx	Kristof Goddaert
2007	Francis De Greef	Jan Ghyselinck	Kristof Goddaert
2008	Jan Ghyselinck	Ben Hermans	Jonathan Dufrasne
2009	Julien Vermote	Jonathan Dufrasne	Romain Zingle
2010	Jonathan Breyne	Gerard Hophra	Guillaume Van Keirsbulck
2011	Kevin De Jonghe	Maarten Vlasselaer	Arthur Vanoverberghe
2012	Yves Lampaert	Frederik Frison	David Desmecht
2013	Victor Campenaerts	Frederik Frison	Edward Theuns
2014	Elias Van Breussegem	Ruben Pols	Tom Bosmans
2015	Ruben Pols	Nathan Van Hooydonck	Aimé De Gendt
2016	Nathan Van Hooydonck	Martin Palm	Senne Leysen
2017	Senne Leysen	Brent Van Moer	Steff Cras
2018	Sasha Weemaes	Guillaume Seye	Harm Vanhoucke
2019	Brent Van Moer	Jasper De Plus	Ilan Van Wilder
2020	Not held		
2021	Lennert Van Eetvelt	Arno Claeys	Noah Vandenbranden
2022	Alec Segaert	Jonathan Vervenne	Lennert Van Eetvelt
2023	Jonathan Vervenne	Robin Orins	Victor Vercouillie
2024	Robin Orins	Ferre Geeraerts	Steffen De Schuyteneer
2025	Jonathan Vervenne	Matisse Van Kerckhove	Ferre Geeraerts

=== Junior ===
Year	Gold	Silver	Bronze
1984	Edwig Van Hooydonck		
1985	Eddy Van Craeynest		
1986	Danny In t'Ven	Bart Leysen	Marc Wauters
1987	Marc Wauters	Pascal De Smul	Glenn Huybrechts
1988	Michel Cargnello	Frank Corvers	Bart Peeters
1989	Stefan Sels	Gunter De Winter	Paul Van Hyfte
1990	Cédric Van Lommel	Paul Van Hyfte	Humpfrey Goffin
1991	Anthon Vermaerke	Mario Willems	Renaud Boxus
1992	Glenn D'Hollander	Rik Verbrugghe	Sébastien Demarbaix
1993	Bart De Ceuster	Tom Stremersch	Roméo Hernandez
1994	Bart De Ceuster	Steven Van Olmen	Jurgen Van de Walle
1995	Leif Hoste	Jurgen Van de Walle	Steven Van Malderghem
1996	Rudy Meyvis	Stijn Devolder	Geert Van Humbeeck
1997	Jan Kuyckx	Kurt Geysen	Staf Scheirlinckx
1998	Gert Steegmans	Jurgen Van Goolen	Tom Boonen
1999	Kevin van Impe	Kevin De Weert	Wouter Van Mechelen
2000	Kevin De Weert	Wim De Vocht	Jurgen Van den Broeck
2001	Olivier Kaisen	Anton Wouters	Johan Peeters
2002	Mario Ickx	Gianni Meersman	Jürgen Roelandts
2003	Dominique Cornu	Michel van Aelbroeck	Jürgen Roelandts
2004	Dominique Cornu	Michel van Aelbroeck	Nikolas Maes
2005	Jan Ghyselinck	Kevin Crabbé	Sam Maertens
2007	Matthias Allegaert	Yannick Wellens	Alphonse Vermote
2009	Kevin De Jonghe	Niels Reynvoet	Sean De Bie
2010	Frederik Frison	Mike De Bie	David Desmecht
2011	Jasper De Buyst	Michael Goolaerts	Boris Vallée
2012	Aimé De Gendt	Dries Van Gestel	Tiesj Benoot
2013	Igor Decraene	Nathan Van Hooydonck	Brent Luyckx
2014	Igor Decraene	Martin Palm	Senne Leysen
2015	Jasper Philipsen	Glenn Loenders	Tom Douhard
2016	Jasper Philipsen	Tom Douhard	Torsten Demeyere
2017	Sébastien Grignard	Loran Cassaert	Ward Vanhoof
2018	Remco Evenepoel	Ilan Van Wilder	Milan Paulus
2019	Lars Van Ryckeghem	Milan Paulus	Ramses Debruyne
2020	Not held		
2021	Cian Uijtdebroeks	Alec Segaert	Jonathan Vervenne
2022	Duarte Marivoet	Jens Verbrugghe	Yarno Van Herck
2023	Duarte Marivoet	Jasper Schoofs	Steffen De Schuyteneer
2024	Aldo Taillieu	Jasper Schoofs	Matisse Van Kerckhove
2025	Seff Van Kerckhove	Jérôme Raus	Rune Boden

== Women ==
=== Elite ===
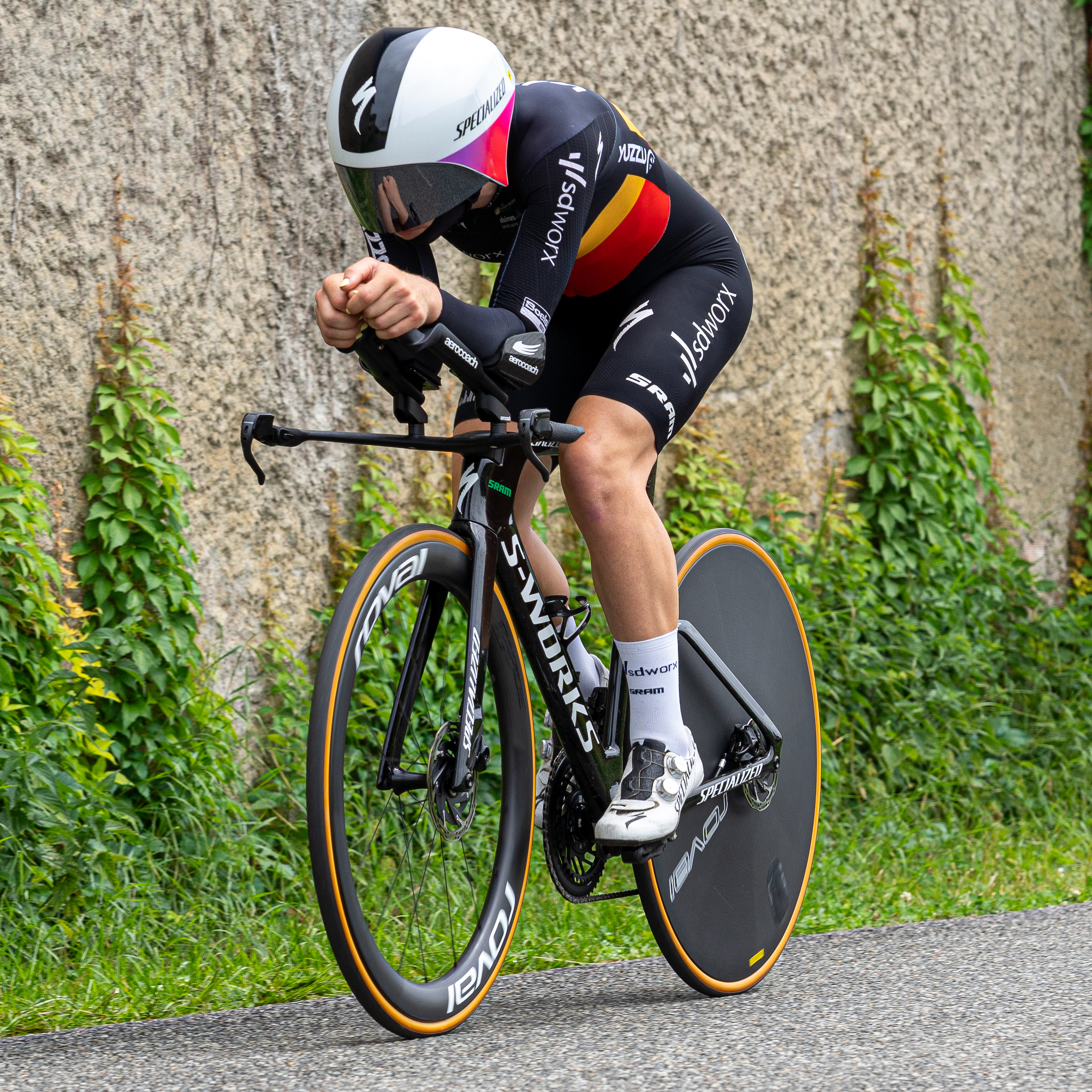
2023 champion Lotte Kopecky wearing the champion's jersey during the 2023 Tour de France Femmes

Year	Gold	Silver	Bronze
1987	Agnes Dusart	Sonja Vermeylen	Nele D'Haene
1988	Kristel Werckx	Agnes Dusart	Yolanda Peeters
1989– 1998	Not held		
1999	Heidi Van De Vijver	Els Decottenier	Evy Van Damme
2000	Heidi Van De Vijver (2)	Natacha Maes	Evy Van Damme
2001	Heidi Van De Vijver (3)	Natacha Maes	Cindy Pieters
2002	Cindy Pieters	Evy Van Damme	Sharon Vandromme
2003	Evy Van Damme	Corine Hierckens	Natacha Maes
2004	Natacha Maes	Evy Van Damme	Ine Wannijn
2005	Natacha Maes (2)	An Van Rie	Ine Wannijn
2006	An Van Rie	Cindy Pieters	Laure Werner
2007	An Van Rie (2)	Ludivine Henrion	Liesbet De Vocht
2008	An Van Rie (3)	Liesbet De Vocht	Kelly Druyts
2009	Liesbet De Vocht	Latoya Brulée	Lieselot Decroix
2010	Grace Verbeke	Liesbet De Vocht	Latoya Brulée
2011	Liesbet De Vocht (2)	Grace Verbeke	Ludivine Henrion
2012	Liesbet De Vocht (3)	Sofie De Vuyst	Ann-Sophie Duyck
2013	Liesbet De Vocht (4)	Maaike Polspoel	Annelies Dom
2014	Ann-Sophie Duyck	Liesbet De Vocht	Maaike Polspoel
2015	Ann-Sophie Duyck (2)	Jolien D'Hoore	Sofie De Vuyst
2016	Ann-Sophie Duyck (3)	Lotte Kopecky	Isabelle Beckers
2017	Ann-Sophie Duyck (4)	Isabelle Beckers	Julie Van de Velde
2018	Ann-Sophie Duyck (5)	Lotte Kopecky	Ellen Van Loy
2019	Lotte Kopecky	Jolien D'Hoore	Annelies Dom
2020	Lotte Kopecky (2)	Sara Van de Vel	Julie Van de Velde
2021	Lotte Kopecky (3)	Julie Van de Velde	Julie De Wilde
2022	Lotte Kopecky (4)	Shari Bossuyt	Britt Knaven
2023	Lotte Kopecky (5)	Febe Jooris	Marthe Goossens
2024	Lotte Kopecky (6)	Marthe Goossens	Marion Norbert-Riberolle
2025	Lotte Kopecky (7)	Marthe Goossens	Lotte Claes
2026	Lotte Claes	Sandrine Tas	Margot Vanpachtenbeke

=== Junior ===
Year	Gold	Silver	Bronze
1999	Ine Wannijn	Laure Werner	Nele Van den Bossche
2000	Ine Wannijn	Sharon Vandromme	Corine Hierckens
2001	Kathy Ingels	Ellen Gevers	Ilse Temmerman
2002	Sara Peeters	Grace Verbeke	Loes Sels
2003	Sara Peeters	Lien Beyen	Laurence Melys
2004	Karen Verbeek	Axelle Doisy	Lindsey Sticker
2005	Alice Pirard	Goedele Van den Steen	Tamara Laeremans
2006	Veronique Staes	Tine Ghyselinck	Goedele Van den Steen
2007	Veronique Staes	Kim Vermeiren	Sanne Van Reusel
2008	Evelyn Arys	Jessie Daams	Jolien D'Hoore
2009	Anisha Vekemans	Kaat Hannes	Daisy Depoorter
2010	Daisy Depoorter	Tessa De Moyer	Marlène Wintgens
2011	Steffy Van Den Haute	Marlène Wintgens	Evelien Deltombe
2012	Lotte Kopecky	Dana Lodewyks	Kaat Van der Meulen
2013	Kelly Van den Steen	Lotte Kopecky	Kaat Van der Meulen
2014	Jesse Vandenbulcke	Lenny Druyts	Saartje Vandenbroucke
2015	Lenny Druyts	Nathalie Bex	Fenna Vanhoutte
2016	Nathalie Bex	Noa Selosse	Chayenne Vranken
2017	Shari Bossuyt	Alana Castrique	Noa Selosse
2018	Shari Bossuyt	Luna Renders	Amber Aernouts
2019	Julie De Wilde	Elena Debouck	Esmée Gielkens
2020	Not held		
2021	Febe Jooris	Marith Vanhove	Sterre Vervloet
2022	Febe Jooris	Xaydée Van Sinaey	Zélie Graux
2023	Luca Vierstraete	Xaydée Van Sinaey	Anna Vanderaerden
2024	Ilken Seynave	Ella Heremans	Lotte Olbrechts
2025	Laura Fivé	Yana Decruyenaere	Melanie Lemmens

== See also ==
- Belgian National Road Race Championships
- National Road Cycling Championships
