= Van Ryckeghem =

Van Ryckeghem is a Belgian surname. Notable people with the surname include:

- Daniel Van Ryckeghem (1945–2008), Belgian cyclist
- Lars Van Ryckeghem (born 2002), Belgian cyclist
- Valérie Van Ryckeghem (born 1975), Belgian golfer
- Willy van Ryckeghem (born 1935), Belgian economist
