= Julien Vermote =

Belgian cyclist

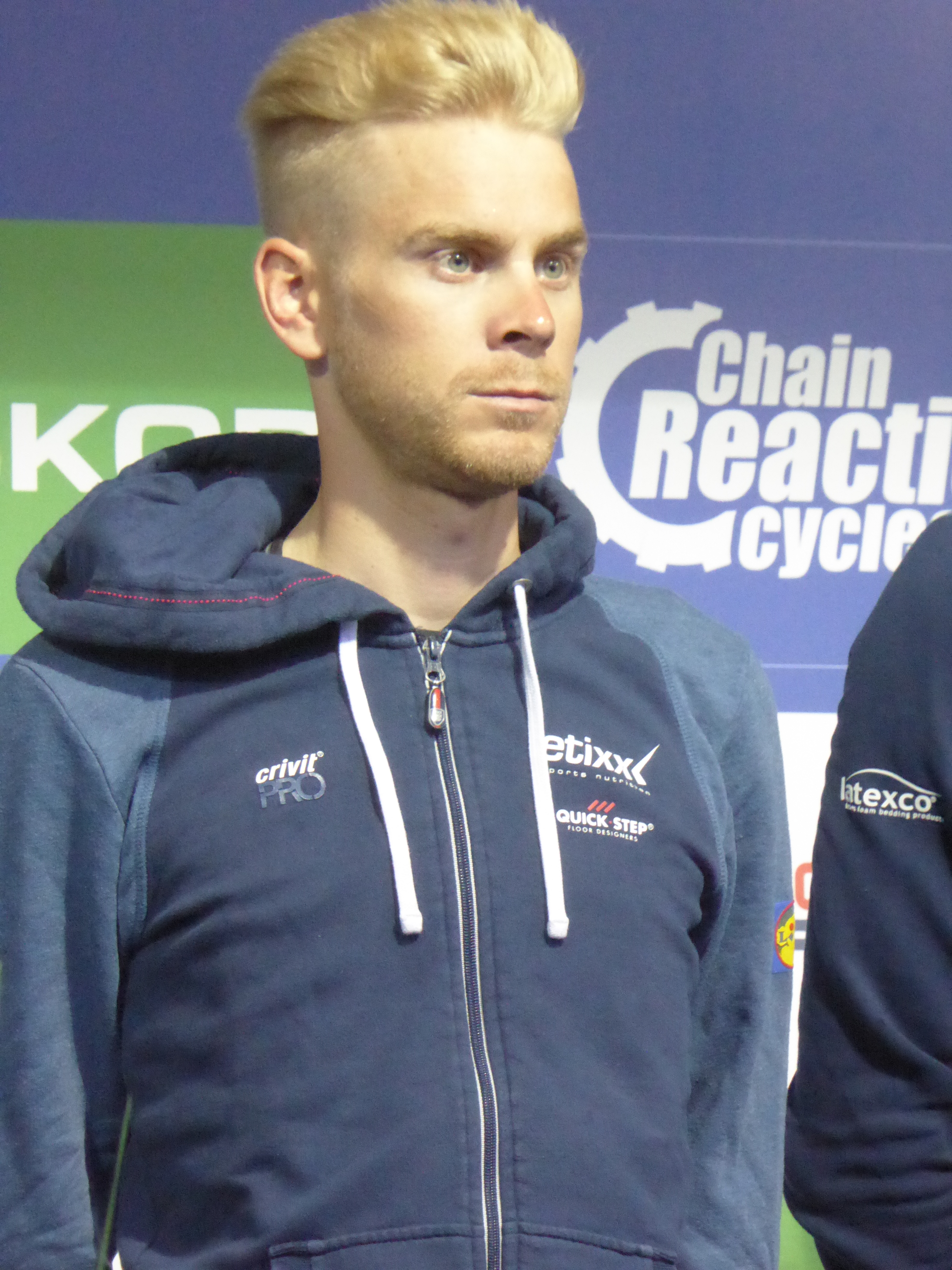
- Vermote at the 2016 Tour of Britain

Personal information
- Full name: Julien Vermote
- Nickname: Jule
- Born: 26 July 1989 (age 37) Kortrijk, Flanders, Belgium
- Height: 1.79 m (5 ft 10 1/2 in)
- Weight: 71 kg (157 lb; 11 st 3 lb)

Cycling career
- Sport: Cycling
- Current team: Visma–Lease a Bike
- Discipline: Road
- Role: Rider
- Rider type: Rouleur; Domestique

Amateur teams
- 2002–2007: KSV Deerlijk
- 2008–2010: Beveren 2000
- 2023: Secteur–Duolar

Professional teams
- 2011–2017: Quick-Step
- 2018–2019: Team Dimension Data
- 2020: Cofidis
- 2021–2022: Alpecin–Fenix
- 2024–: Visma–Lease a Bike
Medal record
Men's road bicycle racing
Representing Omega Pharma–Quick-Step (2014) Etixx–Quick-Step (2016)
World Championships
Gold medal – first place	2016 Doha	Team time trial
Bronze medal – third place	2014 Ponferrada	Team time trial

Julien Vermote (born 26 July 1989) is a Belgian professional cyclist, who rides for UCI WorldTeam Visma–Lease a Bike.

During his professional career, Vermote has taken three wins – the overall victory at the 2012 Driedaagse van West-Vlaanderen along with stage victories at the Tour of Britain in 2014 and 2016. He was also a member of the Etixx–Quick-Step team that won the gold medal in the team time trial at the 2016 UCI Road World Championships.

== Career ==
=== Junior and under-23 career ===
Born in Kortrijk, Flanders, Vermote started racing at a young age and joined the KSV Deerlijk team in 2002 and stayed on that team for the rest of his junior career. He was the national champion in the novice category in 2004. Going through the years, Vermote had results on all levels and his time trialling skills started to develop with multiple wins in the discipline. In his final year in the junior ranks, he won 10 races including Ledegem–Kemmel–Ledegem and a 2nd place in the junior version of the Tour of Flanders.

In his first year in the Under-23 ranks with Beveren 2000 in 2008, Vermote came up with a win in the individual time trial stage at the Le Triptyque des Monts et Châteaux, against a field including time trial specialists Jan Bakelants and Jan Ghyselinck. The following year, Vermote won the under-23 race at the Belgian National Time Trial Championships by 23 seconds. Earlier in the year, Vermote finished second overall at the Tour du Haut-Anjou, four seconds behind race winner Tejay van Garderen; he also won the second stage individual time trial ahead of the likes of Jonathan Castroviejo, Van Garderen and Marcel Kittel. In 2010, Vermote took a solo victory at Brussel–Opwijk, and took podium finishes with third places at Zellik–Galmaarden, and the Grand Prix Criquielion.

=== Quick-Step (2011–2017) ===
In July 2010, it was announced that Vermote was to join Quick-Step for the 2011 season, signing a one-year contract with an option for a further year, which would be taken up.

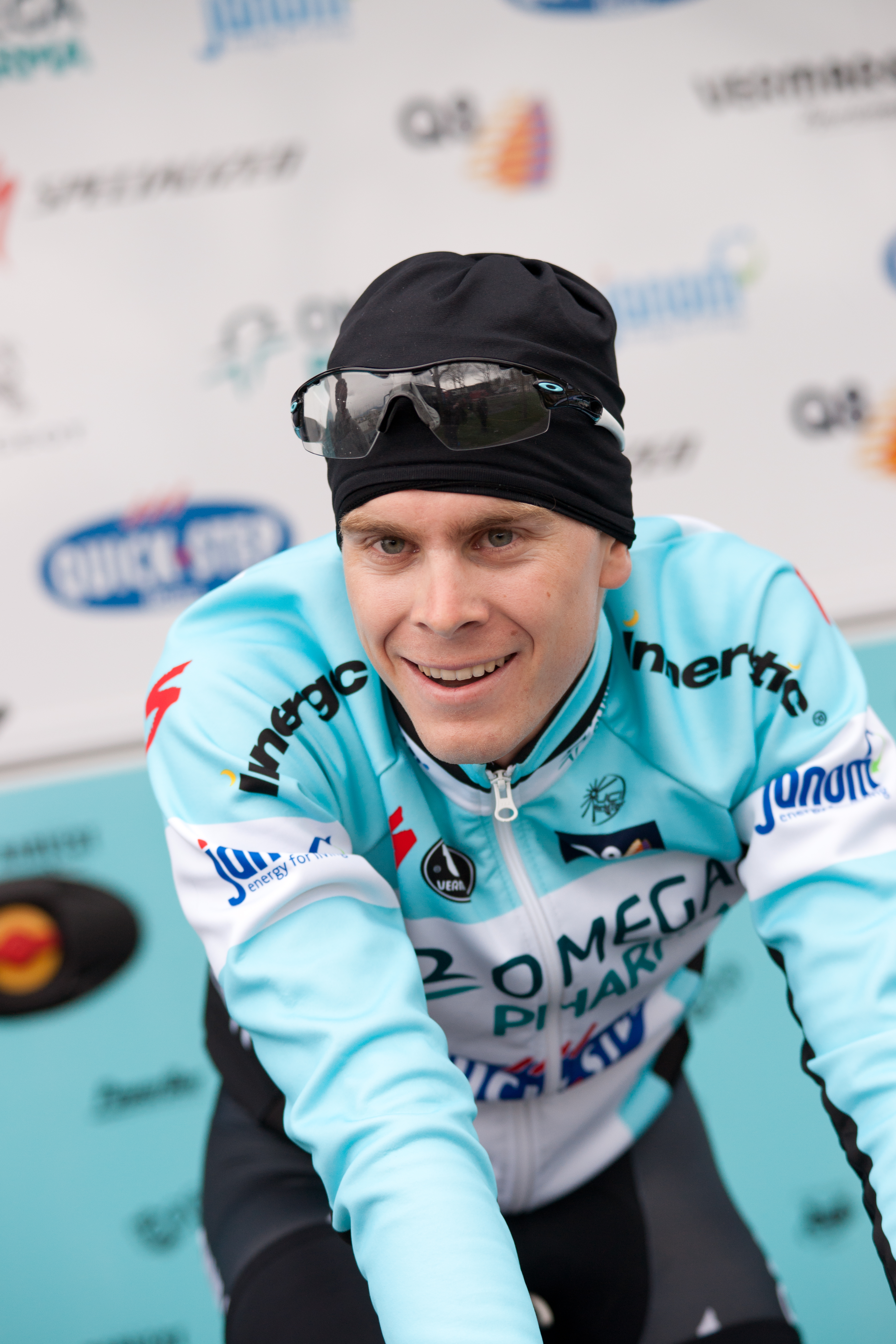
Vermote at the 2012 Tour de Romandie

He took his first victory with the team in March 2012, when he took the general classification at the Driedaagse van West-Vlaanderen after teammate Michał Kwiatkowski withdrew from the race on the final day. In 2013, Vermote won the GP Briek Schotte in September, and recorded third-place finishes at the Belgian National Time Trial Championships and the Duo Normand two-man team time trial with Kristof Vandewalle. At the 2014 Tour of Britain, Vermote won the seventh stage of the race, having made a solo attack from a five-rider breakaway group with around 17 kilometres (11 miles) remaining. A week later, Vermote won a bronze medal at the UCI Road World Championships, as part of the Omega Pharma–Quick-Step squad riding in the team time trial.

He made his first start at the Tour de France in 2015, riding the race for each of his last three years with the team. In 2016, Vermote took his second career stage victory at the Tour of Britain, when he won stage two in Cumbria. Vermote had been a part of the breakaway, which was later joined by a group of overall contenders on the hilly route, before he was the only other rider to follow an attack by Steve Cummings on the run-in to Kendal. Vermote pulled clear of Cummings on the final climb to the line, taking the leader's jersey as well as the stage win. He held the race lead until the sixth stage, a summit finish at Haytor, and ultimately finished the race in ninth place overall. The following month, he won a gold medal in the team time trial at the UCI Road World Championships in Qatar, riding as part of the Etixx–Quick-Step team. Having extended his contract with the team for the 2017 season, Vermote's best individual result was a fifth-place overall finish at the Tour of Belgium.

=== Post-Quick-Step (2018–present) ===
Having spent seven seasons with the Quick-Step squad, Vermote signed with Team Dimension Data for the 2018 season, joining his former teammate Mark Cavendish at the squad. Over the next two seasons, Vermote recorded three top-ten individual placings; finishing ninth at Kuurne–Brussels–Kuurne – being part of a breakaway that was caught with 100 metres (330 feet) remaining – and eighth at the Grand Prix d'Isbergues in 2018, and tenth at Paris–Tours in 2019. He then joined Cofidis for the 2020 season (who were returning to the top level of cycling as a UCI WorldTeam), where he worked largely as a domestique during the COVID-19 pandemic-effected campaign.

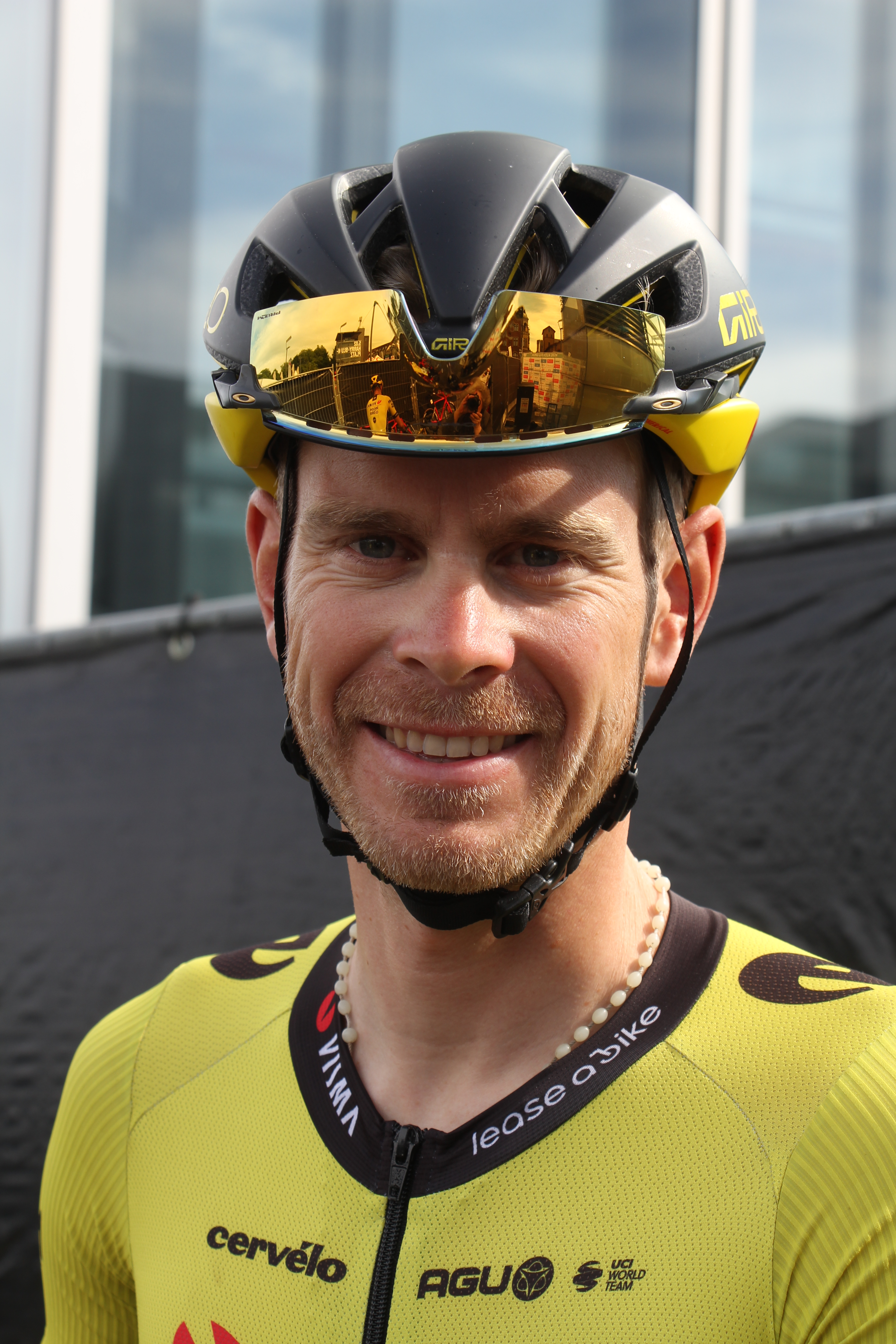
Vermote at the 2024 Rund um Köln

After his one-year contract was not renewed by Cofidis, Vermote started the 2021 season as a free agent. His travails in Spain to earn a contract offer would ultimately lead to his signing by Alpecin–Fenix during the spring. However, he did not contest any races in 2021 due to being diagnosed with COVID-19 and toxoplasmosis, but his contract was extended into 2022 by the team. Having not held a professional contract in 2023, Vermote rode as a one-man team, under the team name Secteur–Duolar. He joined Visma–Lease a Bike for the 2024 season, recording his first top-ten finish with the team with a fourth-place finish in May's Gullegem Koerse, a Belgian kermesse race.

== Personal life ==
His brother is Alphonse Vermote, who also competed as a cyclist for the An Post–Chain Reaction squad in 2014. Vermote is Roman Catholic and gave testimonials in different schools; he says the rosary gives him strengths during his career as a sportsman. He lives in Stasegem, outside Harelbeke, Flanders.

== Major results ==
2006
3rd Time trial, National Junior Road Championships
6th Overall Driedaagse van Axel

1st Young rider classification

2008
1st Stage 2 (ITT) Le Triptyque des Monts et Châteaux
2009
1st Time trial, National Under-23 Road Championships
2nd Overall Tour du Haut-Anjou

1st Stage 2 (ITT)

8th Ronde van Vlaanderen U23
2010
3rd Zellik–Galmaarden
3rd Grand Prix Criquielion
4th La Côte Picarde
6th Circuit de Wallonie
7th Overall Le Triptyque des Monts et Châteaux
2012
1st Overall Driedaagse van West-Vlaanderen

1st Young rider classification

2013
1st GP Briek Schotte
3rd Time trial, National Road Championships
3rd Duo Normand (with Kristof Vandewalle)
2014
1st Stage 7 Tour of Britain
3rd Team time trial, UCI Road World Championships
5th Omloop van het Houtland
8th Brabantse Pijl
2015
8th Overall Three Days of De Panne
2016
1st Team time trial, UCI Road World Championships
1st Textielprijs Vichte
9th Overall Tour of Britain

1st Stage 2

2017
2nd Gullegem Koerse
5th Overall Tour of Belgium
2018
8th Grand Prix d'Isbergues
9th Kuurne–Brussels–Kuurne
2019
10th Paris–Tours
2023
5th Omloop Mandel-Leie-Schelde
5th Schaal Sels
6th GP Briek Schotte
7th Memorial Fred De Bruyne
2024
4th Gullegem Koerse

=== Grand Tour general classification results timeline ===
Grand Tour	2012	2013	2014	2015	2016	2017	2018
Giro d'Italia	89	132	88	—	—	—	—
Tour de France	—	—	—	116	114	139	75
Vuelta a España	Has not contested during his career						

Legend
—	Did not compete
DNF	Did not finish
