= Kristof Vandewalle =

Belgian road cyclist

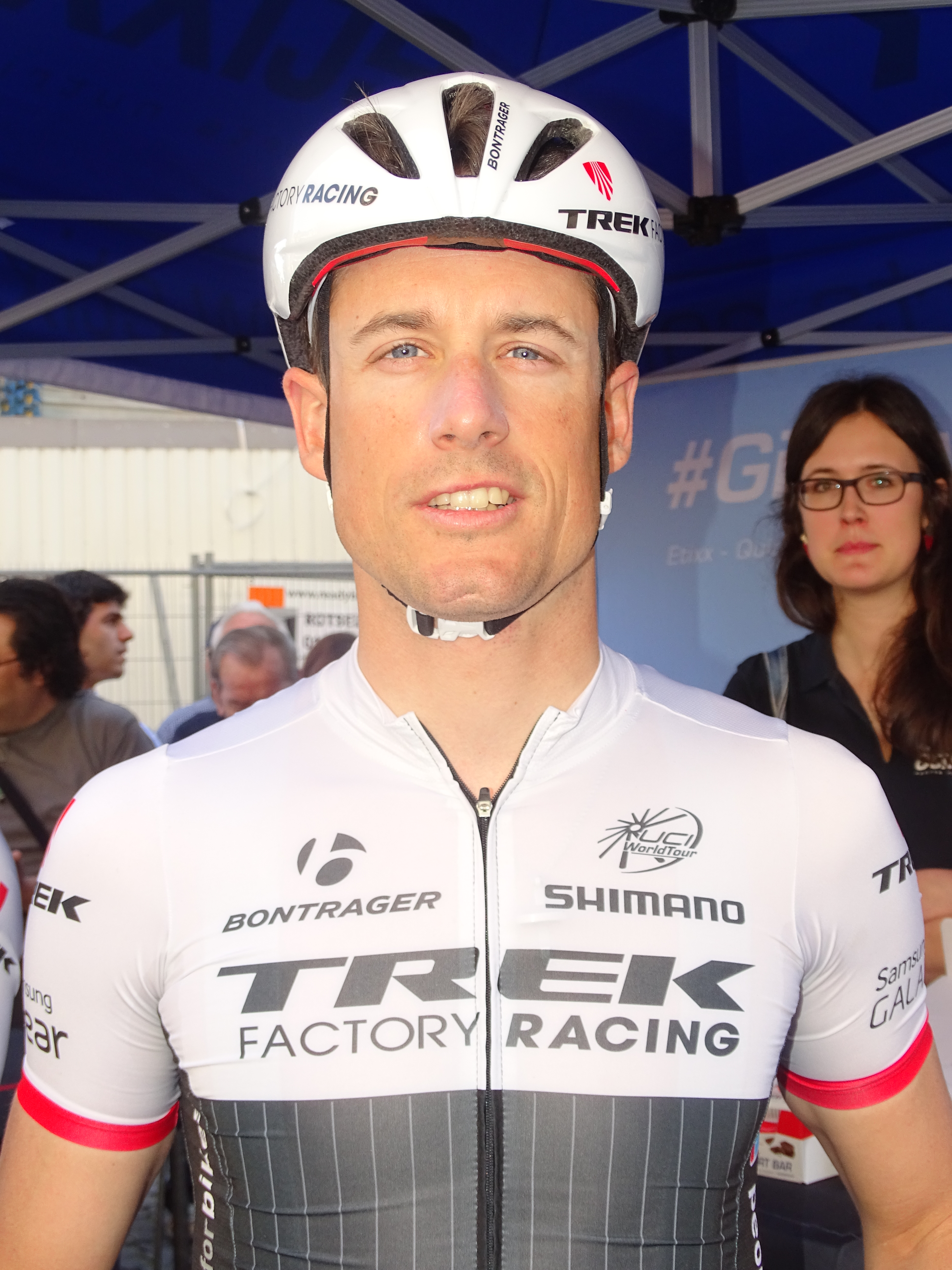
- Vandewalle at the 2015 Brabantse Pijl.

Personal information
- Full name: Kristof Vandewalle
- Born: 5 April 1985 (age 41) Kortrijk, Belgium
- Height: 1.80 m (5 ft 11 in)
- Weight: 71 kg (157 lb)

Cycling career
- Sport: Cycling
- Current team: Retired
- Discipline: Road
- Role: Rider
- Rider type: All-rounder

Amateur team
- 2006–2007: Beveren 2000

Professional teams
- 2008–2010: Topsport Vlaanderen
- 2011–2013: Quick-Step
- 2014–2015: Trek Factory Racing

Major wins
- One-day races and Classics World Team Time Trial Championships (2012, 2013) National Time Trial Championships (2012, 2013, 2014) Grand Prix of Aargau Canton (2010)
Medal record
Men's road bicycle racing
Representing Omega Pharma–Quick-Step
World Championships
Gold medal – first place	2012 Valkenburg	Team time trial
Gold medal – first place	2013 Tuscany	Team time trial

Kristof Vandewalle (born 5 April 1985) is a Belgian former professional road cyclist, who rode professionally between 2008 and 2015 for the Topsport Vlaanderen–Mercator, Omega Pharma–Quick-Step and Trek Factory Racing teams. While a member of the Omega Pharma–Quick-Step squad, he won two successive World Team Time Trial Championships and two consecutive Belgian National Time Trial Championships.

In the 2014 season, Vandewalle was riding for Trek Factory Racing, after three seasons with Omega Pharma–Quick-Step and its precursor Quick-Step. His first victory in the team's colours was a third national time trial championships in May 2014, in Hooglede.

== Major results ==
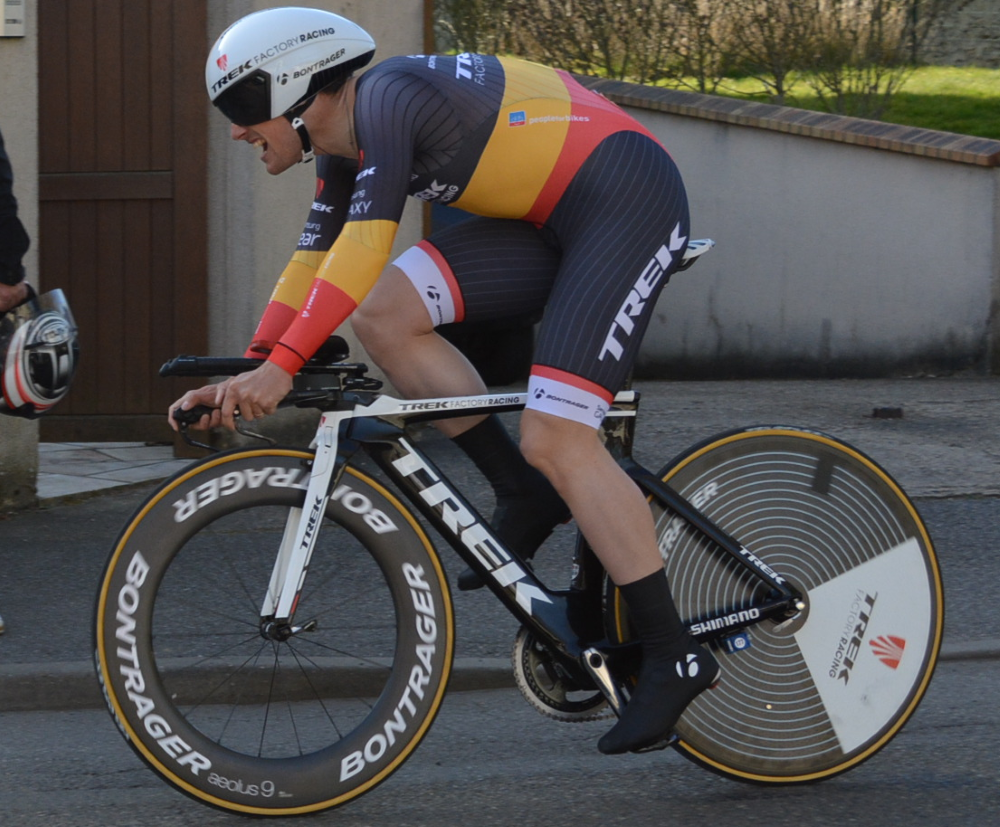
Vandewalle at the 2015 Paris–Nice.

2003
1st Overall Route de l'Avenir

1st Stages 1 & 2

2007
5th Overall Tour du Haut-Anjou
8th Overall Tour de l'Avenir

1st Stage 3

8th Overall Le Triptyque des Monts et Châteaux
2008
6th Duo Normand (with Bart Vanheule)
8th De Vlaamse Pijl
2010
1st Grand Prix of Aargau Canton
4th Tre Valli Varesine
7th Overall Tour de Wallonie
7th Grand Prix Pino Cerami
8th Overall Bayern–Rundfahrt
10th Druivenkoers Overijse
2012
1st Team time trial, UCI Road World Championships
1st Time trial, National Road Championships
1st Stage 2b (TTT) Tour de l'Ain
2013
1st Team time trial, UCI Road World Championships
1st Time trial, National Road Championships
1st Overall Driedaagse van West-Vlaanderen

1st Prologue

3rd Duo Normand (with Julien Vermote)
7th Overall Tour of Belgium
2014
1st Time trial, National Road Championships
1st Stage 7 (ITT) Tour de Pologne
1st Stage 7 (ITT) Tour of Austria
9th Overall Driedaagse van West-Vlaanderen
2015
1st Stage 1 (TTT) Tour of Alberta
3rd Time trial, National Road Championships
