= Jimmy Duquennoy =

Belgian cyclist

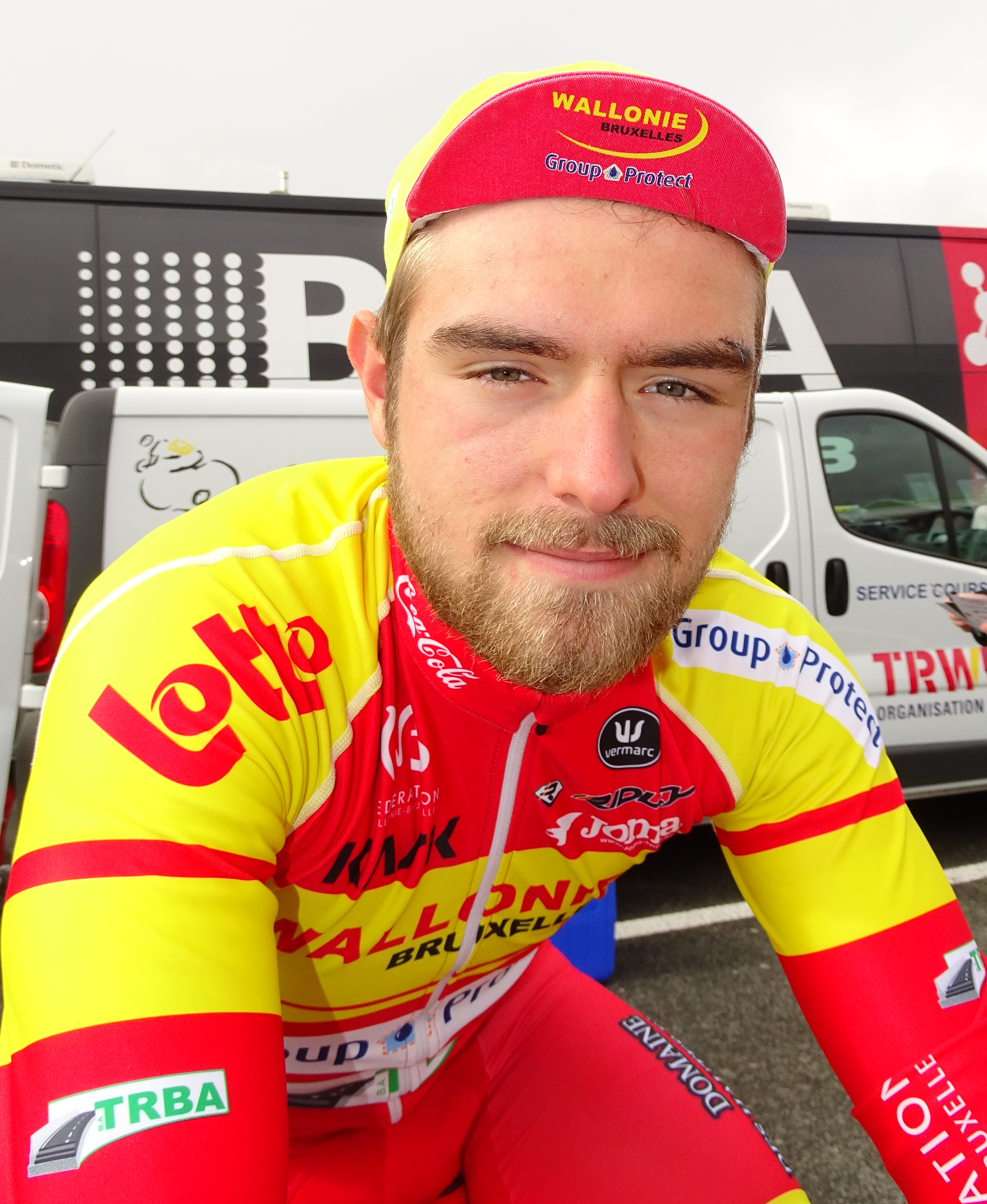
- Duquennoy in 2016

Personal information
- Full name: Jimmy Duquennoy
- Born: 9 June 1995 Tournai, Belgium
- Died: 5 October 2018 (aged 23) Wez-Velvain, Belgium
- Height: 1.79 m (5 ft 10 in)
- Weight: 75 kg (165 lb)

Cycling career
- Sport: Cycling
- Discipline: Road
- Role: Rider

Amateur teams
- 2013: Péruwelz–Bury
- 2014: Ottignies–Perwez

Professional teams
- 2015: Color Code–Aquality Protect
- 2016–2018: Wallonie-Bruxelles–Group Protect

Jimmy Duquennoy (9 June 1995 – 5 October 2018) was a Belgian cyclist, who rode professionally between 2015 and his death in 2018. Duquennoy died at age 23 after suffering cardiac arrest at his home in Wez-Velvain, Belgium.

== Career ==
Duquennoy was recruited for the 2016 season by the Wallonie Bruxelles-Group Protect team, thus turning professional. He began his season at the Étoile de Bessèges and made an early impression by joining the breakaway during the first stage.

During the season, Duquennoy stood out in particular at the Memorial Van Coningsloo, where he finished 9th. A few weeks later, he achieved his first top-10 finish in a UCI 1.1 race by placing 10th at the Arnhem Veenendaal Classic in the Netherlands, a race won in a sprint by Dylan Groenewegen. Less than a month later, he took 8th place at the Grand Prix Marcel Kint.

Toward the end of the season, Duquennoy frequently featured in breakaways. He was notably at the front during the Grand Prix Marcel Kint, the Championship of Flanders, and the Flèche Gooik, as part of his preparation for his main end-of-season goal: Paris–Tours Espoirs. However, he missed his target and ultimately finished 80th in that race, 27 seconds behind the winner, Arvid de Kleijn.

His team obtained a UCI Professional Continental licence for the 2017 season. The full roster for the 2017 season, which included Jimmy Duquennoy, was announced on 8 December 2016.

In March 2018, he finished tenth in the race Dwars door West-Vlaanderen – Johan Museeuw Classic, which was won by French rider Rémi Cavagna. During the same season, he was also part of the early breakaway in the World Tour classics Gent–Wevelgem and Paris–Roubaix.

On the evening of 5 October 2018, he died of a heart attack in his armchair at home, next to his partner, at the age of 23. No cardiac abnormalities had been detected during the pre-season medical tests, according to his sports director Frédéric Amorison.

== Major results ==
2015
7th Paris–Roubaix Espoirs
7th Dwars door de Vlaamse Ardennen
2016
8th Grote Prijs Marcel Kint
9th Memorial Van Coningsloo
10th Arnhem–Veenendaal Classic
2017
9th Circuit de Wallonie
2018
10th Dwars door West–Vlaanderen
