= Evy Van Damme =

Belgian cyclist

Personal information
- Full name: Evy Van Damme
- Born: 29 March 1980 (age 46) Lokeren, Belgium

Cycling career
- Sport: Cycling
- Discipline: Road
- Role: Rider

Amateur teams
- 1999–2000: Vlaanderen 2002 (V)
- 2001: Vlaanderen - T-Interim Ladies Team (V)
- 2005–9 May 2007: Vlaanderen - Capri Sonne - T-Interim

Major wins
- (Belgium) National TT & RR Champion

Evy Van Damme (born 29 March 1980) is a racing cyclist who was born in Lokeren, Belgium. She is a multiple national champion and has competed in many international events. Evy is the older sister of cyclist Charlotte Van Damme and is the former wife of former professional cyclist Nick Nuyens. Together they have three sons: Sting, Sterre and Storm.

== Palmarès ==
1998
3rd Belgian National Road Race Championships - Junior

1999
3rd Belgian National Time Trial Championships

2000
1st (Belgium) Belgian National Road Race Championships
3rd Belgian National Time Trial Championships

2001
1st (Belgium) Belgian National Road Race Championships

2002
2nd Belgian National Time Trial Championships
2nd European Road Race Championships, U23

2003
1st (Belgium) Belgian National Time Trial Championships
