= Cindy Pieters =

Belgian cyclist

Personal information
- Full name: Cindy Pieters
- Born: 24 January 1976 (age 50) Veurne, Belgium

Cycling career
- Sport: Cycling
- Discipline: Road
- Role: Rider

Professional team
- 1999–2007: Vlaanderen-T Interim

Cindy Pieters (born 24 January 1976 in Veurne, Belgium) is a professional racing cyclist, who specialized in one day races. She competed in the women's individual road race at the 2000 Summer Olympics.

== Palmarès ==
1999
1st (Belgium) Belgian National Road Race Championships
3rd La Flèche Wallonne Féminine

2001
3rd Belgian National Time Trial Championships

2002
1st (Belgium) Belgian National Time Trial Championships

2006
2nd Belgian National Time Trial Championships
