= Senne Leysen =

Belgian bicycle racer

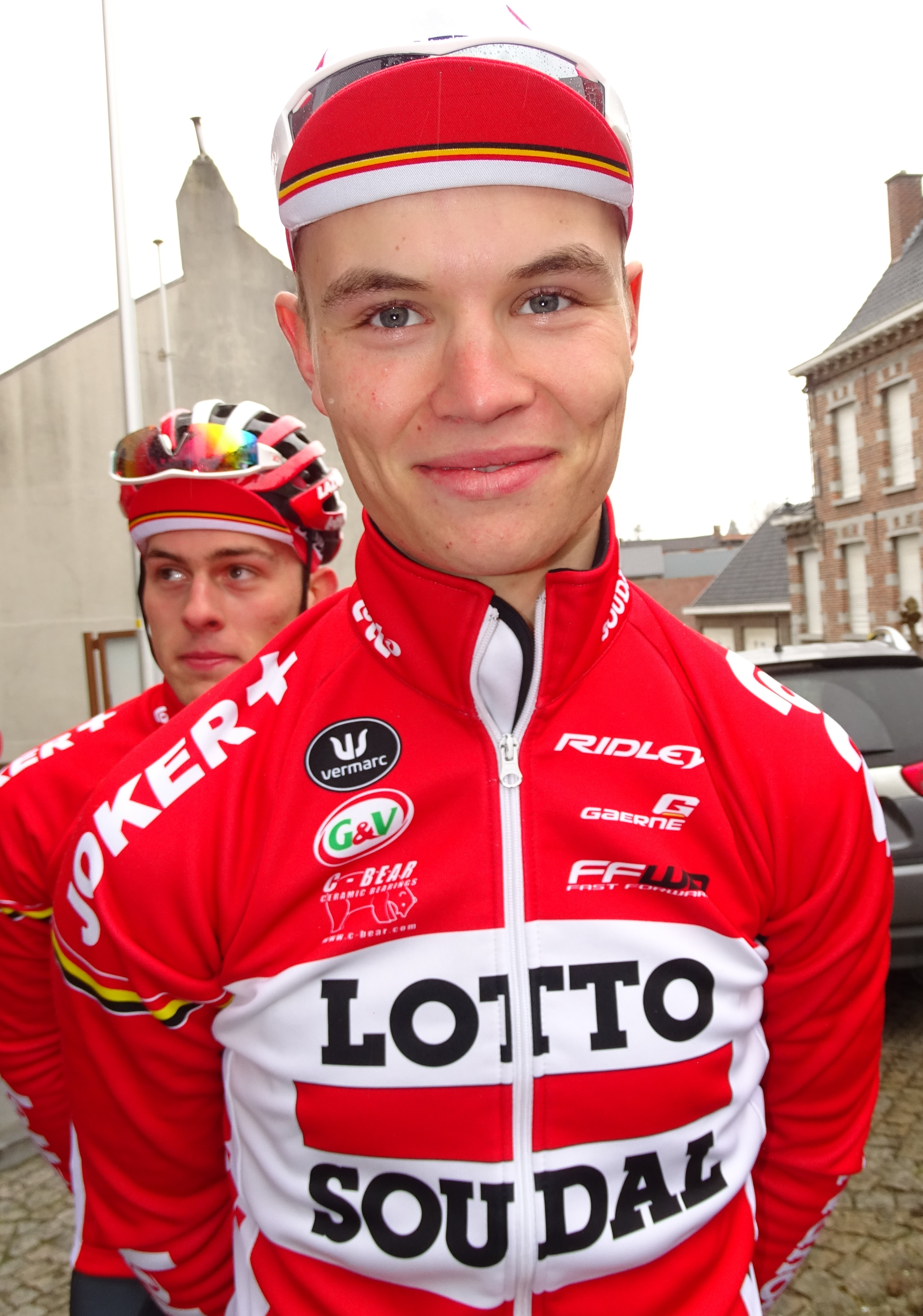
- Leysen in 2016

Personal information
- Full name: Senne Leysen
- Born: 18 March 1996 (age 30) Tielen, Belgium
- Height: 1.9 m (6 ft 3 in)
- Weight: 78 kg (172 lb)

Cycling career
- Sport: Cycling
- Discipline: Road
- Role: Rider
- Rider type: Rouleur; Sprinter

Amateur teams
- 2011: DCM–GB Vorselaar
- 2012–2014: Balen BC
- 2015–2017: Lotto–Soudal U23
- 2017: Lotto–Soudal (stagiaire)

Professional teams
- 2018: Vérandas Willems–Crelan
- 2019: Roompot–Charles
- 2020–2024: Alpecin–Deceuninck

Senne Leysen (born 18 March 1996 in Tielen) is a Belgian cyclist, who last rode for UCI WorldTeam Alpecin–Deceuninck. He is the son of retired cyclist Bart Leysen.

== Major results ==
2014
1st Stage 2 Int. Junioren Driedaagse van Axel
National Junior Road Championships

2nd Road race
3rd Time trial

2015
5th Overall Tour de Berlin

1st Young rider classification

2016
3rd Time trial, National Under-23 Road Championships
10th Time trial, UEC European Under-23 Road Championships
10th Chrono Champenois
2017
1st Time trial, National Under-23 Road Championships
6th Time trial, UCI Under-23 Road World Championships
9th Paris–Roubaix Espoirs
10th Time trial, UEC European Under-23 Road Championships
2020
2nd Overall Tour Bitwa Warszawska 1920

1st Young rider classification
1st Stage 3

=== Grand Tour general classification results timeline ===
Grand Tour	2021	2022	2023
Giro d'Italia	101	118	91
Tour de France	—	—	
Vuelta a España	—	—	

Legend
—	Did not compete
DNF	Did not finish
IP	Race in Progress
