= East Grinstead CC =

Cycling touring club

East Grinstead Cycling Club is a cycle touring club that engage in road racing championships.

== History ==
East Grinstead Cycling Club was formed in 1950, and was initially a cycle touring club. Club members quickly found a love for racing, and the club enjoyed many successes, including numerous Sussex championships in road racing and time trialling.

Many well-known names have passed through its ranks, including Brian Phillips, Stephen Elms, Steven Dennis, and Belgian Women's National champion Natacha Maes.

Sean Yates and his brother Christian both started their cycling careers with the club. Sean went on to become one of Britain's continental professionals with a stage victory in the 1988 Tour de France. He is still a member today, and it's not unknown for a member of the Yates family to show up to a club midweek Time Trial.

== The Club Today ==
Today the club enjoys some local success in Time Trials and is a regular promoter of cyclo-cross, individual time trial & reliability trial rides. During the summer months, the club promotes a full evening program of Time Trials, on Tuesday evenings, across a range of sporting courses and distances in Surrey & Sussex.

The club's website carries details of results, upcoming rides, club records, and how to become a member.

The club is affiliated to British Cycling, Cycling Time Trials, Audax UK, Sussex CA, East Sussex CA, and the Southern Counties Cycling Union.
