= Kevin De Jonghe =

Belgian cyclist

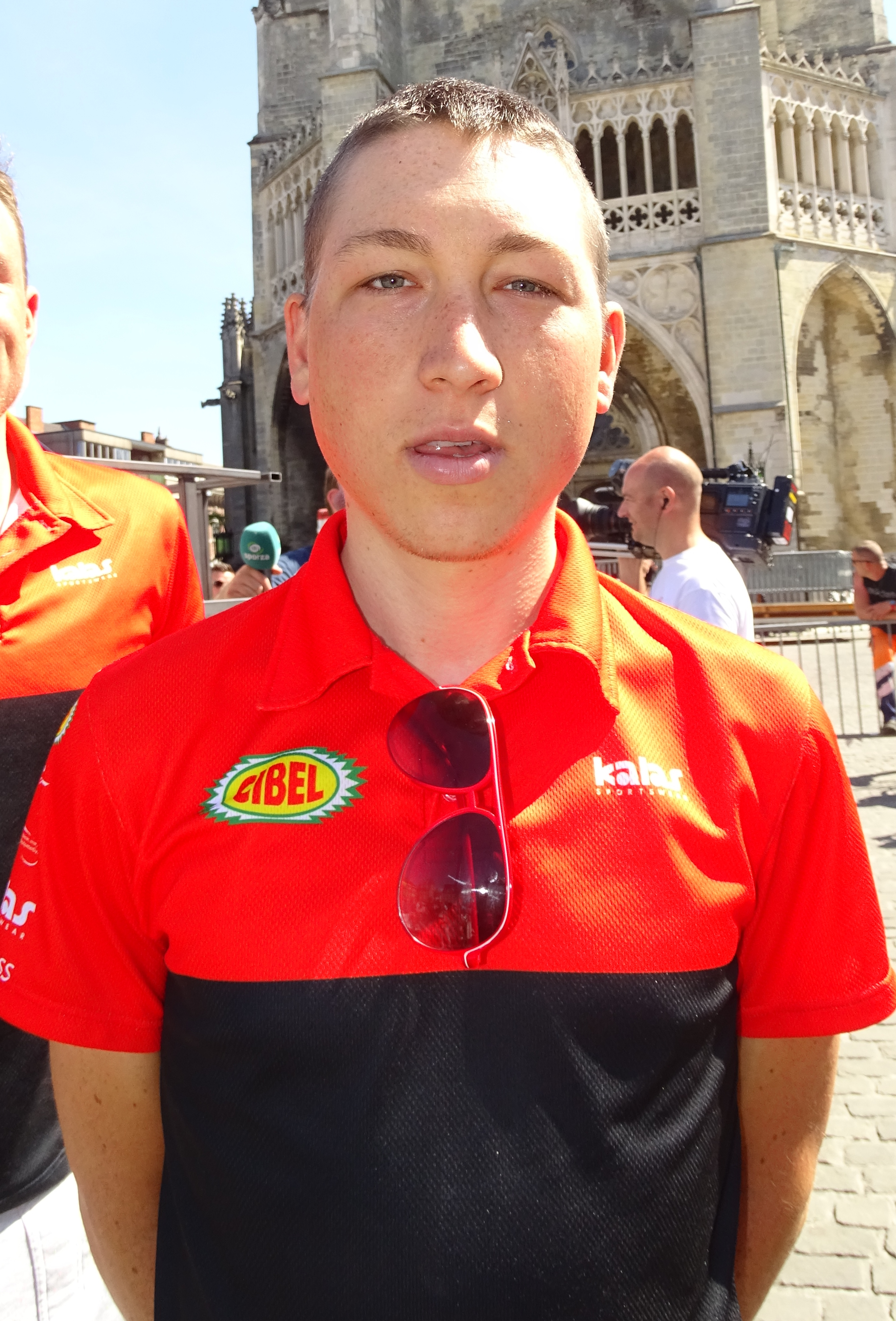
- De Jonghe at the 2015 Ronde van Limburg.

Personal information
- Full name: Kevin De Jonghe
- Born: 4 December 1991 (age 34) Rumst, Belgium
- Height: 176 cm (5 ft 9 in)
- Weight: 69 kg (152 lb)

Cycling career
- Sport: Cycling
- Discipline: Road
- Role: Rider

Amateur team
- 2019: Baguet–MIBA–Indulek–Derito

Professional teams
- 2012–2014: Topsport Vlaanderen–Mercator
- 2015–2017: Cibel
- 2018: Tarteletto–Isorex

Kevin De Jonghe (born 4 December 1991 in Rumst) is a Belgian cyclist, who last rode for Belgian amateur team Baguet–MIBA–Indulek–Derito.

== Major results ==
2009
1st Time trial, National Junior Road Championships
2011
1st Time trial, National Under-23 Road Championships
2016
8th Internationale Wielertrofee Jong Maar Moedig
2017
1st Stage 3 Tour de Savoie Mont Blanc
3rd Overall Tour de Taiwan
9th Dwars door de Vlaamse Ardennen
