= Olivier Kaisen =

Belgian cyclist

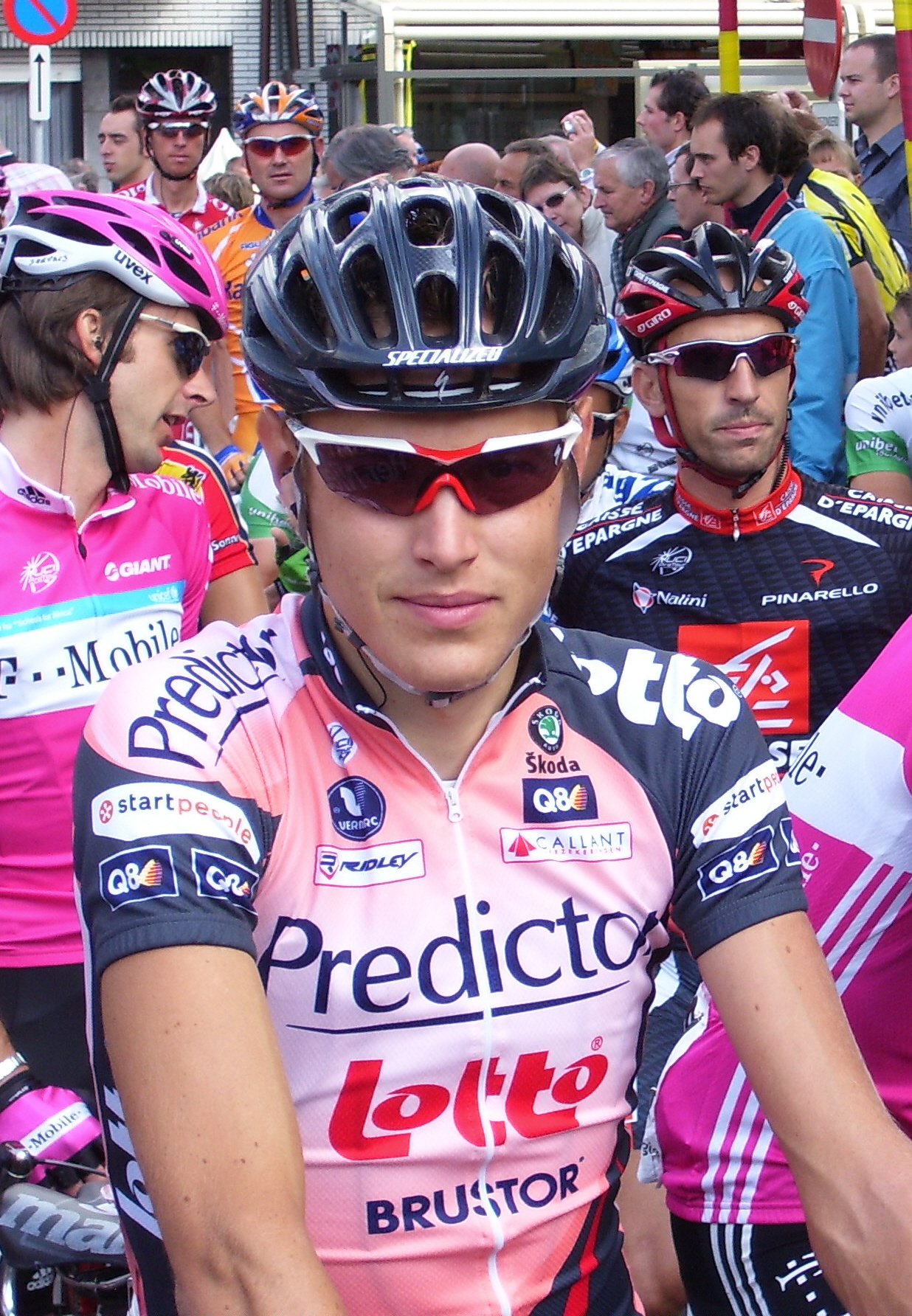
- Kaisen at the 2007 Eneco Tour.

Personal information
- Full name: Olivier Kaisen
- Born: 30 April 1983 (age 43) Belgium
- Height: 1.95 m (6 ft 5 in)
- Weight: 82 kg (181 lb)

Cycling career
- Sport: Cycling
- Current team: Wagner Bazin WB; Bingoal WB Devo Team
- Discipline: Road
- Role: Rider (retired); Directeur sportif
- Rider type: Domestique

Amateur team
- VC de l'Orne Blanmont

Professional teams
- 2005: R.A.G.T. Semences
- 2006–2014: Davitamon–Lotto

Managerial teams
- 2016–: Wallonie-Bruxelles–Group Protect
- 2019–: Wallonie–Bruxelles Development Team

Major wins
- GP Gerrie Kneteman (2007)

Olivier Kaisen (born 30 April 1983) is a Belgian former professional road bicycle racer, who competed professionally between 2005 and 2014. He currently works as a directeur sportif for UCI ProTeam Wagner Bazin WB and its junior team, UCI Continental team Bingoal WB Devo Team.

== Career ==
After riding for R.A.G.T Semences in 2005, Kaisen joined Davitamon–Lotto in 2006 and rode for the team for the remainder of his career. On 10 February 2014, it was announced that Kaisen was medically compelled to retire from the sport because of cardiac rhythm problems.

== Major results ==
2001
1st National Junior Time Trial Championships
2002
3rd National Under-23 Time Trial Championships
2003
1st National Under-23 Time Trial Championships
2004
1st Chrono des Herbiers – U23 version
3rd National Under-23 Time Trial Championships
2005
2nd Overall Tour de Wallonie
5th Chrono des Herbiers
10th Chrono Champenois
2006
3rd Overall Circuit Franco-Belge
2007
1st Grote Prijs Gerrie Knetemann
8th Kampioenschap van Vlaanderen
10th Chrono des Nations
2009
1st Stage 5 Tour of Turkey
2011
5th Overall Tour of Beijing
