= Ruben Pols =

Belgian bicycle racer

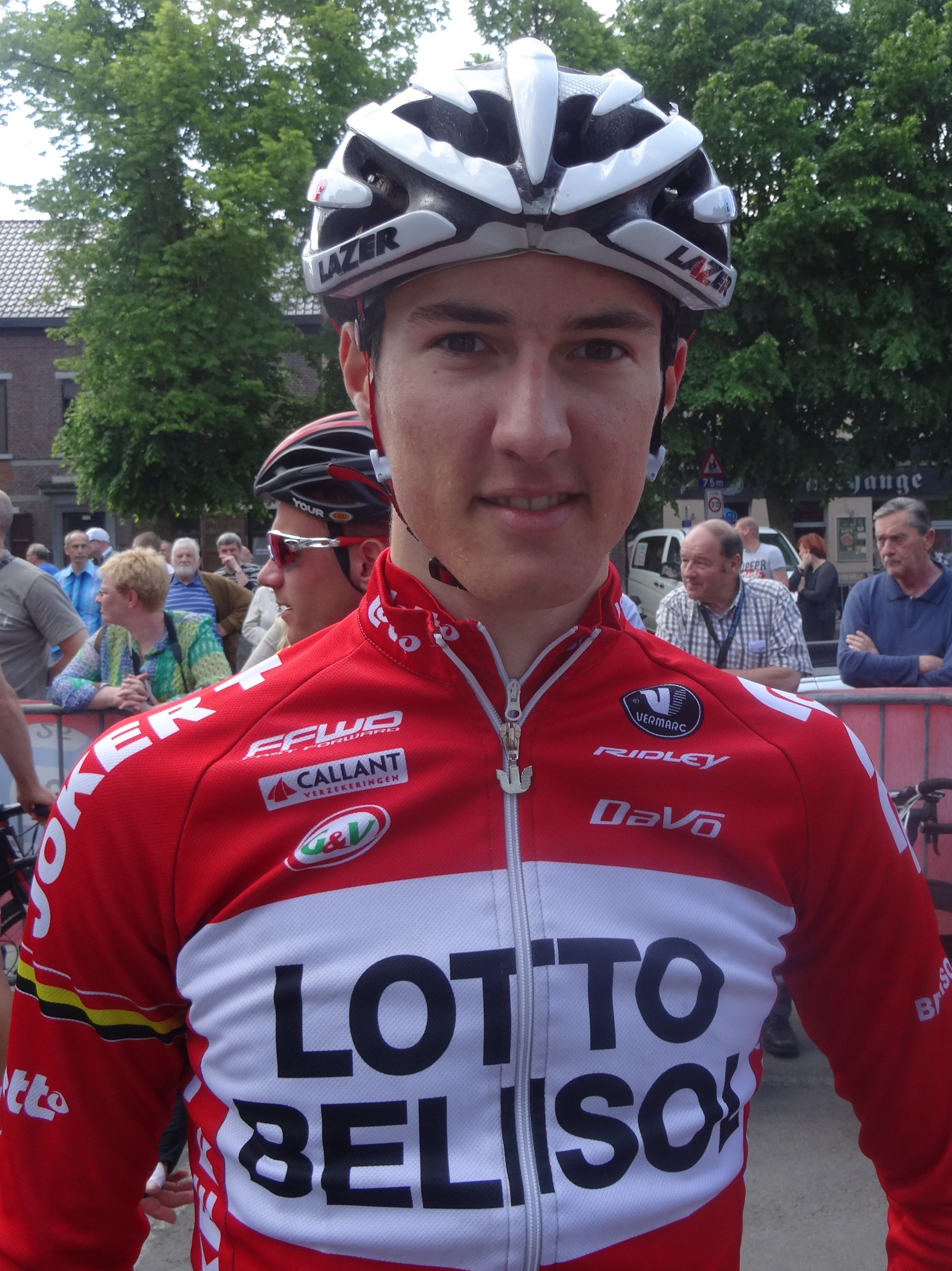
- Pols in 2014

Personal information
- Full name: Ruben Pols
- Born: 3 November 1994 (age 31) Geraardsbergen, Belgium

Cycling career
- Sport: Cycling
- Current team: Retired
- Discipline: Road
- Role: Rider

Amateur teams
- 2011–2012: Onder Ons Parike
- 2014–2015: Lotto–Belisol U23

Professional teams
- 2013: Ventilair–Steria Cycling Team
- 2016–2017: Topsport Vlaanderen–Baloise

Ruben Pols (born 3 November 1994 in Geraardsbergen) is a Belgian former cyclist, who rode professionally for the Ventilair–Steria Cycling Team in 2013 and Sport Vlaanderen–Baloise in 2016 and 2017.

== Major results ==
2014
2nd Time trial, National Under-23 Road Championships
7th Grand Prix des Marbriers
10th Overall Le Triptyque des Monts et Châteaux
2015
1st Time trial, National Under-23 Road Championships
6th Time trial, UEC European Under-23 Road Championships
