= 2018 Dwars door West-Vlaanderen =

- 2018 UCI Europe Tour

Race details
- Dates: 4 March 2018
- Stages: 1
- Distance: 189.3 km (117.6 mi)
- Winning time: 4h 28' 29"

Results
	Winner	Rémi Cavagna (FRA)	(Quick-Step Floors)
	Second	Florian Sénéchal (FRA)	(Quick-Step Floors)
	Third	Frederik Frison (BEL)	(Lotto–Soudal)

The 2018 Dwars door West-Vlaanderen was the 72nd edition of the Dwars door West-Vlaanderen road cycling one day race. It was part of UCI Europe Tour in category 1.1.

== Teams ==
Twenty-two teams were invited to take part in the race. These included two UCI World Tour teams, twelve UCI Professional Continental teams and eight UCI Continental teams.

UCI WorldTeams

- Quick-Step Floors
- Lotto–Soudal

UCI Professional Continental teams

- Vital Concept
- Gazprom–RusVelo
- Cofidis
- Wanty–Groupe Gobert
- Vérandas Willems–Crelan
- Sport Vlaanderen–Baloise
- Direct Énergie
- WB Aqua Protect Veranclassic
- UnitedHealthcare
- Roompot–Nederlandse Loterij
- Fortuneo–Samsic
- CCC–Sprandi–Polkowice

UCI Continental teams

- Cibel–Cebon
- BEAT Cycling Club
- Differdange–Losch
- Tarteletto–Isorex
- SEG Racing Academy
- Delta Cycling Rotterdam
- Monkey Town Continental Team
- Joker Icopal

== Result ==
Result
Rank	Rider	Team	Time
1	Rémi Cavagna (FRA)	Quick-Step Floors	4h 28' 29"
2	Florian Sénéchal (FRA)	Quick-Step Floors	+ 3"
3	Frederik Frison (BEL)	Lotto–Soudal	+ 10"
4	Fabio Jakobsen (NED)	Quick-Step Floors	+ 55"
5	Anthony Turgis (FRA)	Cofidis	+ 55"
6	Guillaume Van Keirsbulck (BEL)	Wanty–Groupe Gobert	+ 55"
7	Jhonatan Narváez (ECU)	Quick-Step Floors	+ 55"
8	Christophe Noppe (BEL)	Sport Vlaanderen–Baloise	+ 59"
9	Michael Goolaerts (BEL)	Vérandas Willems–Crelan	+ 59"
10	Jimmy Duquennoy (BEL)	WB Aqua Protect Veranclassic	+ 59"
