= Frederik Frison =

Belgian bicycle racer

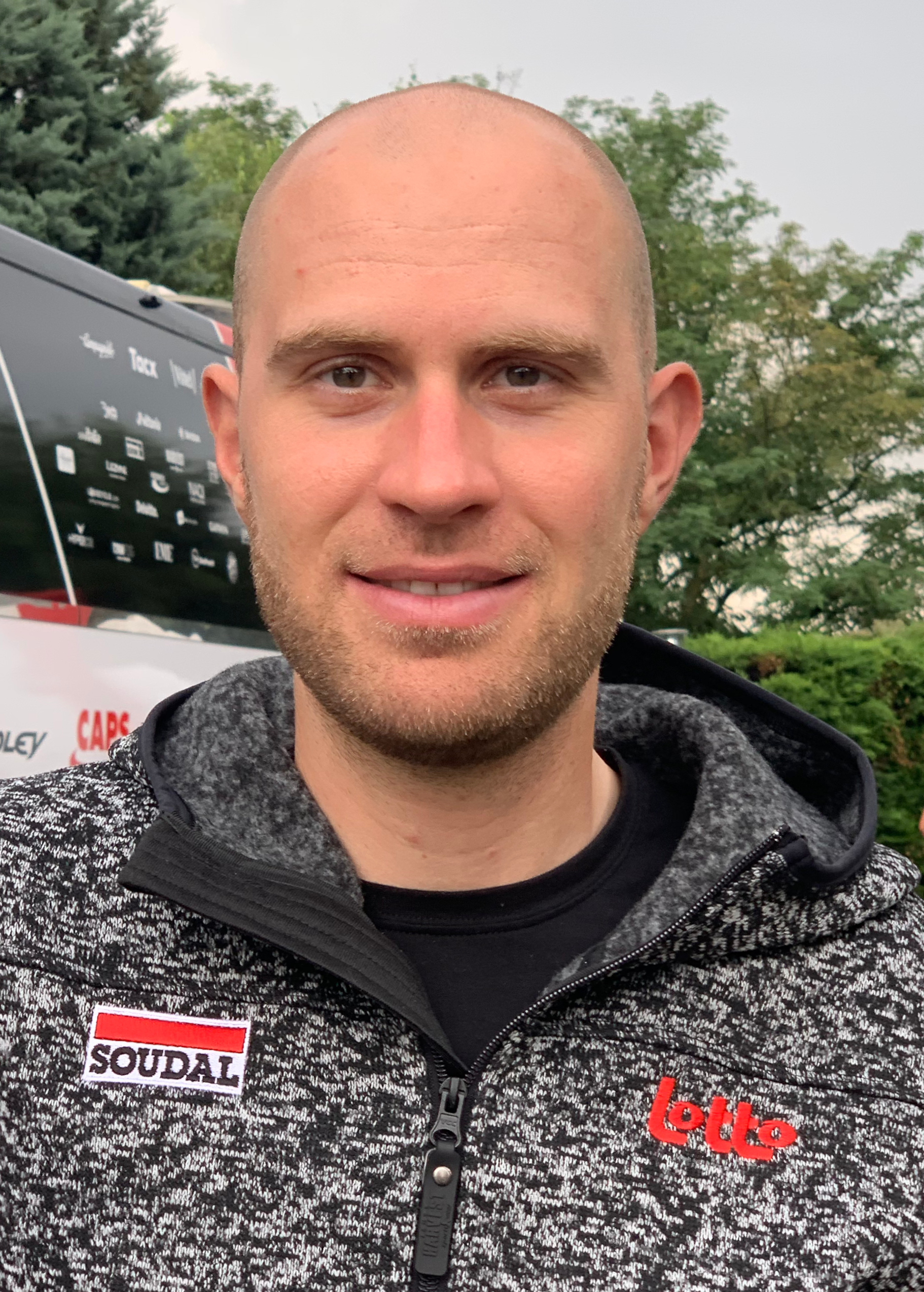
- Frison at the 2021 Tour de l'Ain

Personal information
- Full name: Frederik Frison
- Born: 28 July 1992 (age 34) Geel, Belgium
- Height: 1.94 m (6 ft 4 in)
- Weight: 79 kg (174 lb)

Cycling career
- Sport: Cycling
- Current team: Pinarello–Q36.5 Pro Cycling Team
- Discipline: Road
- Role: Rider

Amateur teams
- 2015: Lotto–Soudal U23
- 2015: Lotto–Soudal (stagiaire)

Professional teams
- 2016–2023: Lotto–Soudal
- 2024–: Q36.5 Pro Cycling Team

Frederik Frison (born 28 July 1992) is a Belgian professional road cyclist, who currently rides for UCI ProTeam Pinarello–Q36.5 Pro Cycling Team. He rode first for the Lotto–Soudal U23 team, where he had some success in the first part of the 2015 season. He was then signed to the senior team as a stagiaire; he rode races including the 2015 Tour of Britain and the 2015 Paris–Tours. In December 2015, he signed a professional contract to ride for Lotto–Soudal from the 2016 season. In May 2018, he was named in the startlist for the 2018 Giro d'Italia. In August 2020, he was named in the startlist for the 2020 Tour de France.

== Personal life ==
He is related through his father to former professional cyclist Herman Frison, who is his great uncle.

== Major results ==
2009
6th Overall Sint–Martinusprijs Kontich

1st Stage 4

2010
1st Time trial, National Junior Road Championships
2nd Kuurne–Brussels–Kuurne Juniores
2012
2nd Time trial, National Under-23 Road Championships
2013
National Under-23 Road Championships

2nd Time trial
3rd Road race

7th Chrono Champenois
2014
8th Chrono Champenois
9th Time trial, UCI Under-23 Road World Championships
2015
9th Overall Olympia's Tour
9th Memorial Van Coningsloo
10th Overall Tour du Loir-et-Cher
2017
7th Le Samyn
2018
3rd Primus Classic
3rd Dwars door West–Vlaanderen
5th Time trial, National Road Championships
2019
5th Time trial, National Road Championships
2020
3rd Time trial, National Road Championships
2022
5th Time trial, National Road Championships
2023
4th Gent–Wevelgem
4th Classic Brugge–De Panne

=== Grand Tour general classification results timeline ===
Grand Tour	2018	2019	2020	2021	2022	2023
Giro d'Italia	142	—	—	—	—	—
Tour de France	—	—	145	—	131	147
Vuelta a España	—	—	—	DNF	—	

Legend
—	Did not compete
DNF	Did not finish
IP	In progress
