= Natacha Maes =

Belgian cyclist

Personal information
- Full name: Natacha Maes
- Born: 15 March 1965 (age 61) Watermael-Boitsfort, Belgium

Cycling career
- Sport: Cycling
- Discipline: Road
- Role: Rider
- Rider type: Time triallist

Amateur teams
- 1999: East Grinstead CC
- 2000–2005: In Gear RT
- 2004–2005: Wielerclub Oostende Noordzee

Major wins
- (Belgium) National Time Trial Champion

Natacha Maes (born 15 March 1965 in Watermael-Boitsfort) is a racing cyclist who was born in Watermael-Boitsfort, Belgium and lives in Lancing, Sussex. She became the Belgian National Road Race Champion in 2004. She has competed in many international events including the Tour de l'Aude as part of the Belgian national team in 2005.

== Palmarès ==
2000
2nd Belgian National Time Trial Championships (BEL)
1st CTT Circuit Time Trial Championships (GBR)
4th 25 mile, CTT National Time Trial Championships (GBR)

2001
2nd 25 mile, CTT National Time Trial Championships (GBR)

2002
2nd Wielsbeke (BEL)

2004
1st (Belgium) Belgian National Time Trial Championships
1st (Belgium) Belgian National Road Race Championships

2005
1st (Belgium) Belgian National Time Trial Championships
2nd Burcht (BEL)
1st Passendale (BEL)
1st Steenokkerzeel (BEL)
