= Aldo Taillieu =

Belgian cyclist

Personal information
- Born: 10 February 2006 (age 20) Aalst, Belgium
- Height: 1.85 m (6 ft 1 in)
- Weight: 68 kg (150 lb)

Cycling career
- Sport: Cycling
- Current team: Lotto Development Team
- Discipline: Road
- Role: Rider

Amateur teams
- 2023: Canguru Latexco
- 2024: Air College – B-Concept

Professional team
- 2025–: Lotto Development Team

Aldo Taillieu (born 10 February 2006) is a Belgian professional racing cyclist, who currently rides for UCI Continental team Lotto Development Team.

== Career ==
In February 2025, Taillieu took his first professional victory after winning the prologue of the Tour du Rwanda.

== Major results ==
2023
4th Heestert
6th Tour du Condroz
2024
National Junior Road Championships

1st Time trial
3rd Road race

1st Kuurne–Brussels–Kuurne Juniors
1st Route des Géants
1st Testtijdrit Borlo
1st Stage 3a Giro della Lunigiana
2nd Overall Guido Reybrouck Classic
3rd Trofee van Vlaanderen
4th Klimkoers Herbeumont Juniors
5th Overall Course de la Paix Juniors

1st Points classification

6th Nokere Koerse Juniors
8th Ronde van Vlaanderen Juniors
2025 (1 pro win)
1st Prologue Tour du Rwanda
2026
6th NXT Classic
