= Bert Roesems =

Belgian cyclist

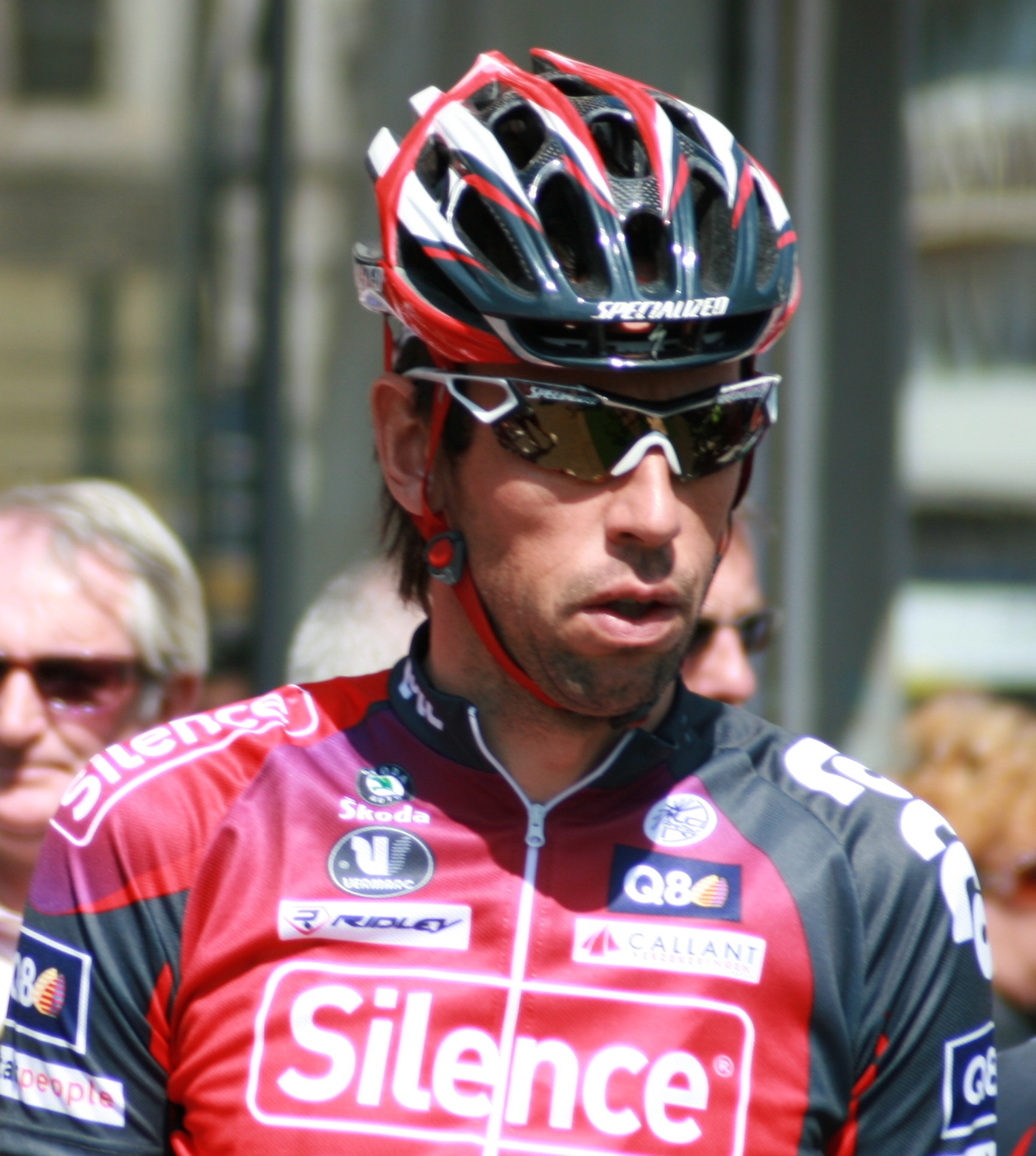

Personal information
- Full name: Bert Roesems
- Born: 14 October 1972 (age 54) Halle (Vlaams-Brabant), Belgium
- Height: 1.96 m (6 ft 5 in)
- Weight: 81 kg (179 lb)

Cycling career
- Sport: Cycling
- Discipline: Road
- Role: Rider

Professional teams
- 1997–1998: Vlaanderen 2002
- 1999–2001: Landbouwkrediet-Colnago
- 2002–2003: Palmans-Collstrop
- 2004: Bodysol-Brustor-Relax
- 2005–2008: Predictor-Lotto
- 2009: Cinelli-Down Under

Major wins
- Tour of Belgium, 2 stages (2002, 2004); Niedersachsen Rundfährt Overall (2005); National Time-trial Champion (2004)

Bert Roesems (born 14 October 1972) is a Belgian former professional road bicycle racer.

== Major results ==
1996
1st Amateur Time Trial Champion
1st Stage 4 Tour de Liège
1st Stage 5 Tour de Liège
1997
1st Overall, Wielerweekend Zeeuws-Vlaanderen
3rd Belgian National Time Trial Championships
1998
1st Kustpijl
1999
1st Overall Tour de la Somme

1st Stage 2 ITT

1st Stage 2 ITT OZ Wielerweekend
2nd Belgian National Time Trial Championships
2nd Circuit Franco-Belge

1st Stage 3

2000
1st Leeuwse Pijl
2001
1st Pursuit Champion
1st Brussels-Ingooigem
1st Stage 3, Tour de la Somme
2nd Belgian National Time Trial Championships
2nd Overall Tour de Wallonie

1st Stage 5 ITT

2002
2nd Belgian National Time Trial Championships
8th Overall Tour of Belgium

1st Prologue

8th Overall Postgirot Open

1st Stage 1a ITT

13th World Time Trial Championship
2003
1st GP Denain
1st Stage 5 ITT Course de la Solidarité Olympique
1st Stage 3 ITT GP Erik Breukink
3rd Belgian National Time Trial Championships
9th World Time Trial Championship
2004
1st Belgian National Time Trial Championships
1st Overall, Niedersachsen-Rundfahrt

1st Stage 3

1st Chrono des Herbiers ITT
1st Stage 4a ITT Tour of Belgium
13th World Time Trial Championship
2005
1st Brussels-Ingooigem
2nd Belgian National Time Trial Championships
2006
1st Nokere Koerse
2nd Belgian National Time Trial Championships
8th Paris–Roubaix
