= Michael Goolaerts =

Belgian cyclist (1994–2018)

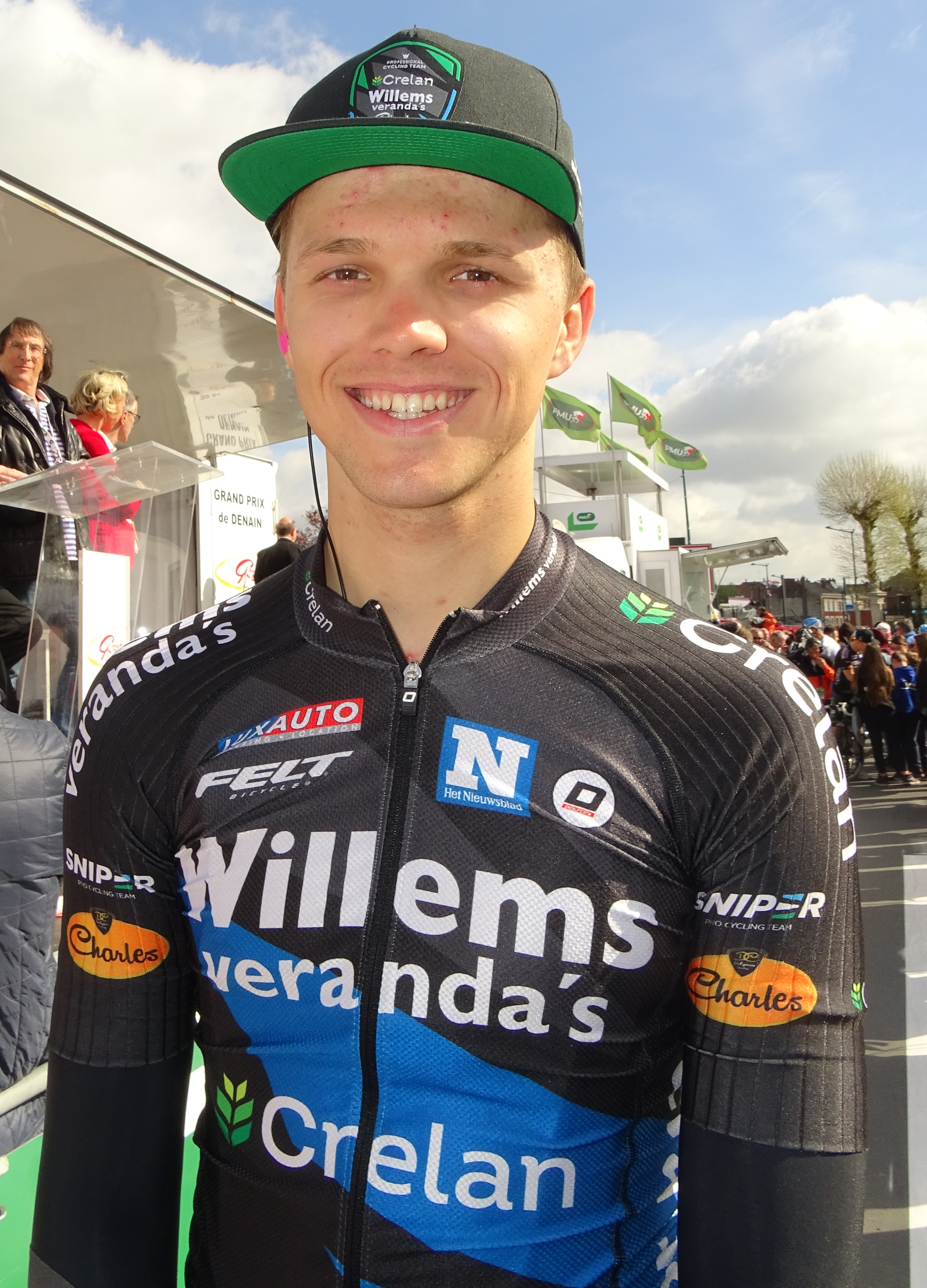
- Goolaerts in 2017

Personal information
- Nickname: Goolie
- Born: 24 July 1994 Lier, Belgium
- Died: 8 April 2018 (aged 23) Lille, France
- Height: 1.86 m (6 ft 1 in)
- Weight: 80 kg (176 lb)

Cycling career
- Sport: Cycling
- Discipline: Road
- Role: Rider

Amateur teams
- 2013: Verandas Willems (stagiaire)
- 2015–2016: Lotto–Soudal U23
- 2016: Lotto–Soudal (stagiaire)

Professional teams
- 2014: Verandas Willems
- 2017–2018: Vérandas Willems–Crelan

Michael Goolaerts (Dutch: [ˈmɑikəl ˈɣoːlaːrts]; 24 July 1994 – 8 April 2018) was a Belgian cyclist who rode for Vérandas Willems–Crelan. During the 2018 Paris–Roubaix, Goolaerts suffered a cardiac arrest. He was airlifted to a hospital in Lille, where he died hours later.

== Biography ==
Goolaerts was born in Lier and grew up in Hallaar, Heist-op-den-Berg, where he became a member of the Balen Bicycle Club. He won the provincial individual time trial championship title of Antwerp in the newcomers category in 2010. He also won the individual time trial championship title in the juniors category in 2011. In 2012, he was part of the teams that won Belgian national junior championship titles in the team pursuit and the team sprint. That year he also finished eighth in the junior version of the Tour of Flanders.

He joined the Verandas Willems team as a stagiaire in the second half of 2013, and went on to secure a full-time contract with the team the following year. In 2015 he joined Lotto-Soudal's development team.

Goolaerts joined Lotto–Soudal as a stagiaire, starting on 1 August 2016, before rejoining the now UCI Professional Continental team Vérandas Willems–Crelan for the 2017 season. He made his debut in the Étoile de Bessèges, and had a top-10 position in the GP Briek Schotte. That year he also made the early breakaways in the Tour of Flanders, where he remained in the front group for over 200 km, Halle–Ingooigem, where his performance earned the praise of Tom Boonen, and Paris-Tours. At the start of the 2018 season he placed ninth in Dwars door West–Vlaanderen.

On 8 April 2018, Goolaerts started in his first Paris–Roubaix. On the second cobbled sector, at Briastre, after 109 km of racing, he suffered cardiorespiratory arrest and lay unresponsive on the ground. He was resuscitated by paramedics and transferred by helicopter to CHRU-Hospital in Lille. He died later that evening. An autopsy concluded that he had suffered a cardiac arrest before he fell from his bike.

In May 2018 it was announced that the cobbled section where he crashed would be renamed the "Secteur Pavé Michael Goolaerts" in his honour, and that his family would be invited to unveil a monument at the site of his fall the following month.

When crossing the finish line of the 2026 edition of Paris-Roubaix, the victor, Wout van Aert, pointed to the sky and in subsequent interviews dedicated his win to Goolaerts.

== Major results ==
As of April 2018

2012
1st Team sprint, National Junior Track Championships
8th Junior Tour of Flanders
2015
4th Paris–Chauny
2016
1st Stage 1 Tour du Loir-et-Cher
9th Nationale Sluitingprijs
2018
9th Dwars door West–Vlaanderen

== See also ==
- List of cyclists with a cycling-related death
