= Annelies Dom =

Belgian cyclist (born 1986)

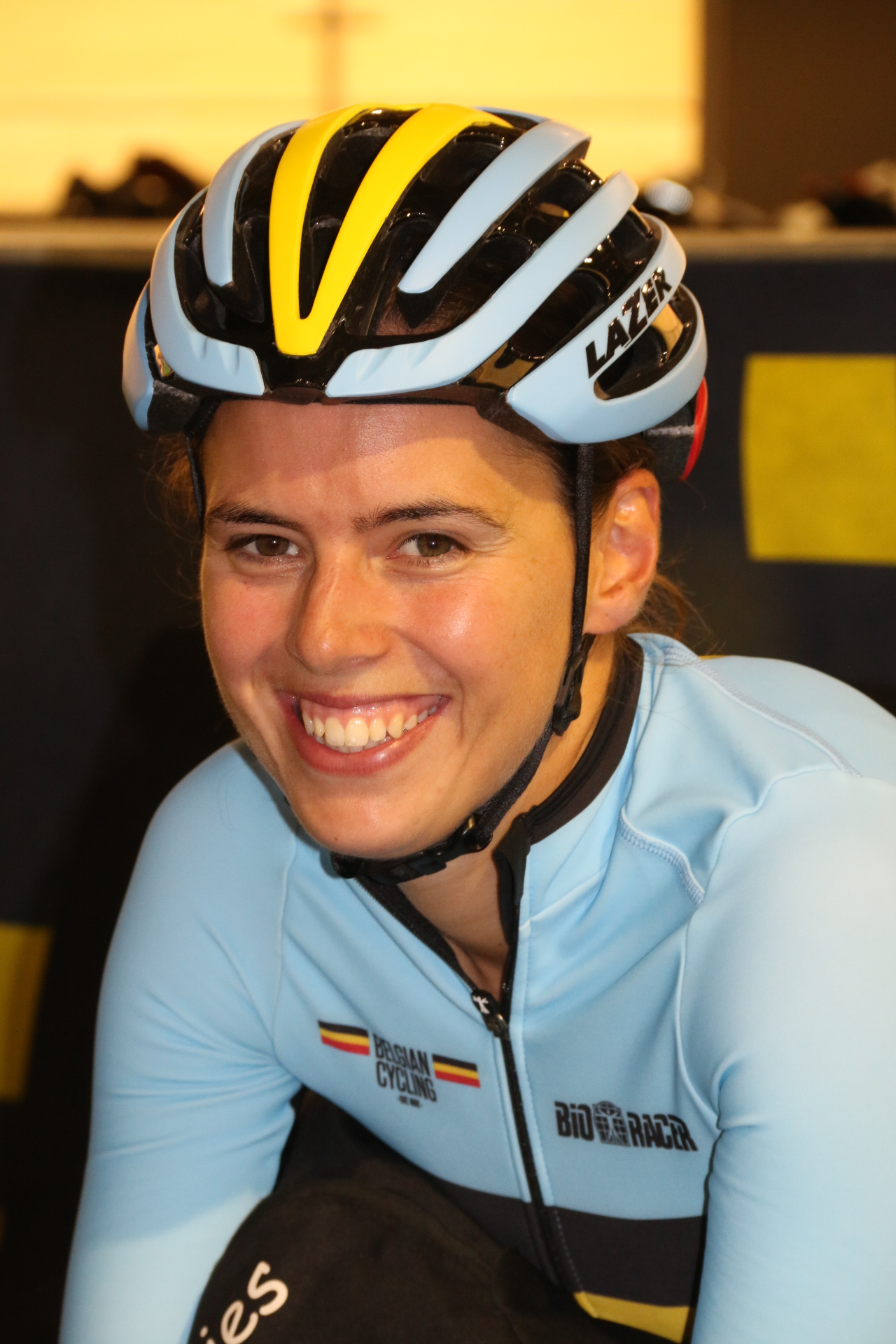
- Dom in 2017

Personal information
- Full name: Annelies Dom
- Born: 8 April 1986 (age 40)

Cycling career
- Sport: Cycling
- Current team: Retired
- Disciplines: Road; Track
- Role: Rider; Directeur sportif

Professional teams
- 2013–2016: Team Futurumshop.nl–Polaris
- 2017–2020: Lotto–Soudal Ladies

Managerial teams
- 2021: Lotto–Soudal Ladies
- 2022: IBCT

Annelies Dom (born 8 April 1986) is a Belgian former professional racing cyclist, who rode professionally between 2013 and 2020 for the Lensworld–Zannata and Lotto–Soudal Ladies teams. Her only professional victory was winning the 2018 Belgian National Road Race Championships in Binche.

Following her retirement, Dom worked as a directeur sportif for UCI Women's Continental Teams Lotto–Soudal Ladies, and IBCT. In 2022, Dom became the chief sports director at the Vlaamse Schaatsunie, the union for speed skating in Flanders.

== Major results ==
2013
3rd Time trial, National Road Championships
2014
10th Erondegemse Pijl
2015
9th Cholet Pays de Loire Dames
2016
9th Overall Tour de Bretagne Féminin
2018
1st Road race, National Road Championships
1st Points race, National Track Championships
3rd Omloop van de IJsseldelta
9th Omloop van de Westhoek
2019
3rd Time trial, National Road Championships
9th Nokere Koerse

== See also ==
- List of 2015 UCI Women's Teams and riders
