= Lars Van Ryckeghem =

Belgian racing cyclist

Personal information
- Full name: Lars Van Ryckeghem
- Born: 18 September 2002 (age 24)
- Height: 1.89 m (6 ft 2 in)
- Weight: 80 kg (176 lb)

Cycling career
- Sport: Cycling
- Current team: Lotto–Soudal U23
- Discipline: Road
- Role: Roder
- Rider type: Time trialist

Amateur teams
- 2020: CT Luc Wallays
- 2021–: Lotto–Soudal U23

Major wins
- Belgian National Junior Men's Individual Time Trial (2019)

Lars Van Ryckeghem (born 18 September 2002) is a Belgian racing cyclist. Lars currently rides for the Lotto–Soudal U23, and previously rode for the CT Luc Wallays club in Belgium as a junior.

For the 2021 season, Lars signed for the Belgian Lotto–Soudal U23 squad, the development team of UCI WorldTeam Lotto–Intermarché.

In May, 2019, Lars won the Belgian Junior National Individual Time Trial Championships. In June, 2019, Lars placed 3rd in the Belgian National Road Race for Men's Juniors. The following September, Lars rode for Belgium in the 2019 UCI Road World Championships, held in Yorkshire, England, and placed 28th in the Mens Junior Individual Time Trial.

== Major results ==
2019
National Junior Road Championships

1st Time trial
3rd Road race
