= Bart Leysen =

Belgian cyclist

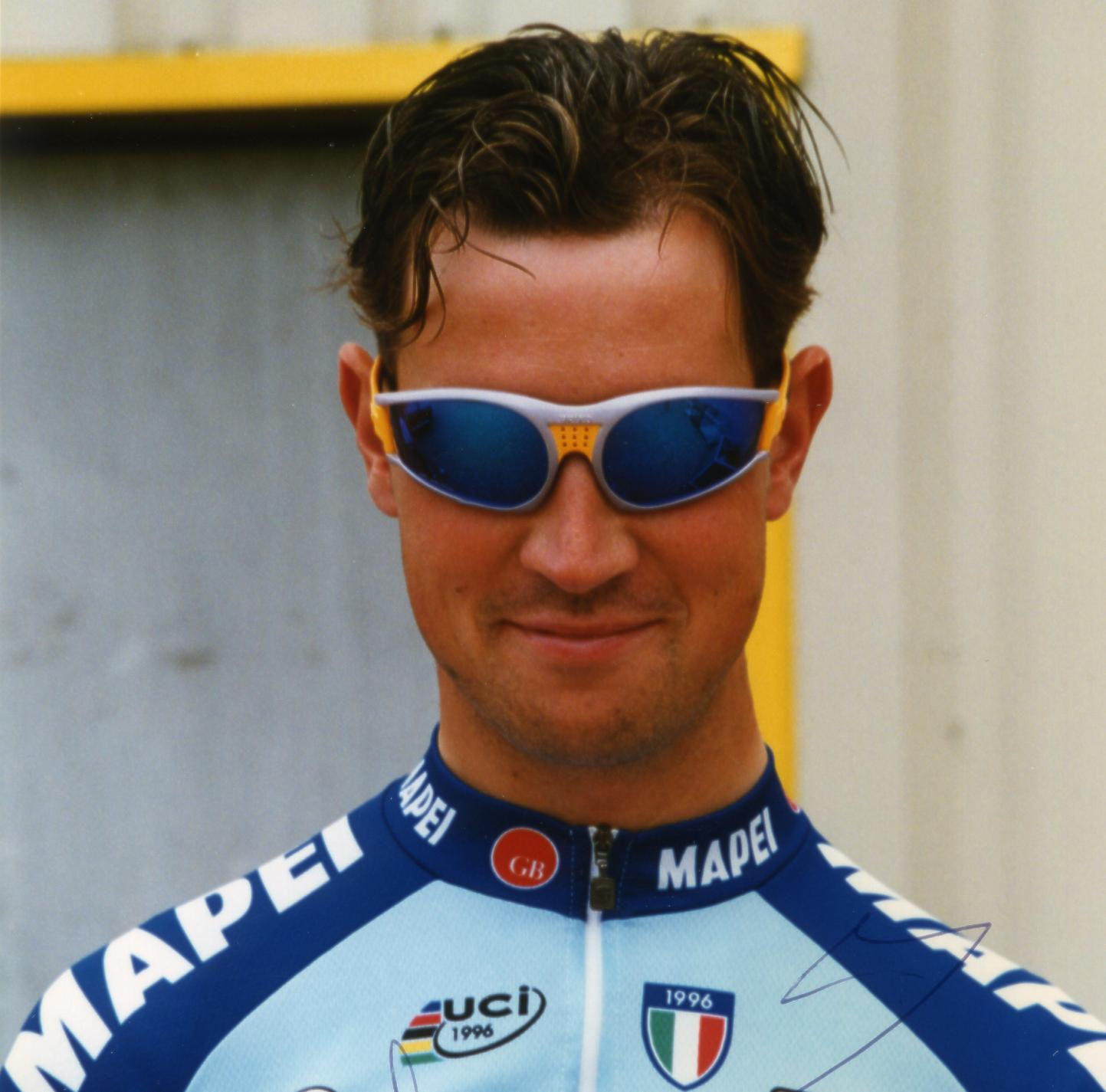

Personal information
- Born: 10 February 1969 (age 57) Herentals, Belgium

Cycling career
- Sport: Cycling
- Role: Rider

Professional teams
- 1991–93: Lotto
- 1994: Vlaanderen 2002
- 1995–2001: Mapei
- 2002: Palmans-Collstrop

Bart Leysen (born 10 February 1969) is a Belgian retired road racing cyclist. He competed at the 1998 and 1999 Tour de France. He is the father of Senne Leysen.

== Results at the Grand Tours ==
=== Tour de France ===
- 1998 : 92º
- 1999 : 133º
- 2001 : Did not finish

=== Vuelta a España ===
- 1995 : 78º
- 1996 : 77º
