= Jurgen Van de Walle =

Belgian road bicycle racer

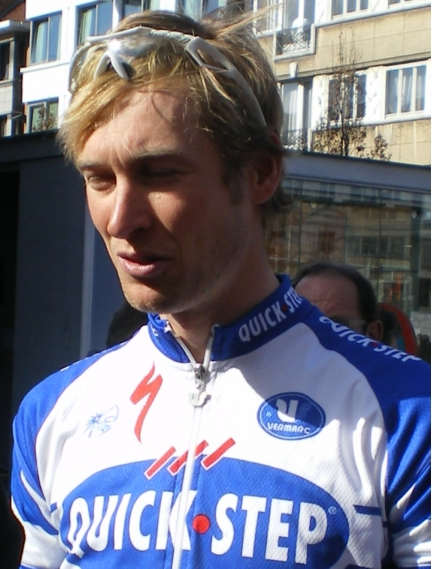
- Van de Walle at the 2008 Driedaagse van West-Vlaanderen.

Personal information
- Full name: Jurgen Van de Walle
- Born: 9 February 1977 (age 49) Eernegem, Belgium
- Height: 1.89 m (6 ft 2 1/2 in)
- Weight: 75 kg (165 lb)

Cycling career
- Sport: Cycling
- Current team: Retired
- Discipline: Road
- Role: Rider

Professional teams
- 1999–2000: Palmans
- 2001: Landbouwkrediet–Colnago
- 2002–2004: Vlaanderen–T Interim
- 2005: Landbouwkrediet–Colnago
- 2006–2010: Quick-Step–Innergetic
- 2011–2013: Omega Pharma–Lotto

Jurgen Van de Walle (born 9 February 1977, in Eernegem) is a Belgian former professional road bicycle racer, who competed as a professional between 1999 and 2013. Over his career, Van de Walle competed for the Palmans, Landbouwkrediet–Colnago (twice), Vlaanderen–T Interim, Quick-Step and Lotto–Belisol squads.

Van de Walle retired at the end of the 2013 season, after fifteen seasons as a professional.

== Major results ==
2000
1st, Stage 1, Circuito Montañés
2001
6th Druivenkoers Overijse
7th Tour du Doubs
9th Omloop van de Westkust
10th Stadsprijs Geraardsbergen
2002
10th Schynberg-Rundfahrt
2003
2nd Overall Tour de China
6th Overall Étoile de Bessèges
6th GP Citta di Rio Saliceto e Correggio
2004
5th Paris–Bourges
6th Cholet-Pays de Loire
9th Grand Prix de Denain
2005
5th Overall Volta ao Algarve
8th Overall Tour of Britain
9th Subida al Naranco
2006
2nd Overall, Ster Elektrotoer
3rd Overall, Tour du Haut Var
4th Overall Circuit Franco-Belge
4th Grand Prix of Aargau Canton
8th Grand Prix d'Isbergues
2007
7th Overall Tour du Poitou-Charentes
2008
1st, Stage 1 (TTT), Tour of Qatar
5th Omloop van het Houtland
8th Overall Tour of California
2009
1st, Halle–Ingooigem
2010
1st, Halle–Ingooigem
3rd, Brabantse Pijl
2013
3rd Ruddervoorde Koerse
