= Bart Vanheule =

Belgian cyclist

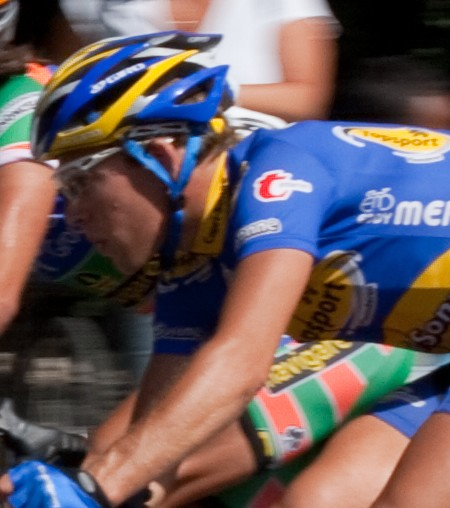

Personal information
- Full name: Bart Vanheule
- Born: 10 November 1983 (age 42) Ghent, Belgium
- Height: 1.86 m (6 ft 1 in)
- Weight: 76 kg (168 lb)

Cycling career
- Sport: Cycling
- Current team: Retired
- Discipline: Road
- Role: Rider

Professional teams
- 2005: Bodysol–Win for Life–Jong Vlaanderen
- 2006–2009: Chocolade Jacques–Topsport Vlaanderen

Bart Vanheule (born 10 November 1983) is a Belgian former professional road bicycle racer who rode for UCI Professional Continental team Chocolade Jacques–Topsport Vlaanderen between 2006 and 2009.

== Major results ==
2004
6th Overall Le Triptyque des Monts et Châteaux
2005
1st Gullegem Koerse
2nd Time trial, National Under-23 Road Championships
3rd Omloop Het Nieuwsblad U23
6th GP de Dourges-Hénin-Beaumont
2008
6th Duo Normand
2009
3rd Batavus Prorace
