= Wez-Velvain =

Village in Wallonia, Belgium

Coordinates: 50°32′N 03°23′E

Wez-Velvain (Picard: Wés'-Vélvin) is a village of Wallonia and a district of the municipality of Brunehaut, located in the province of Hainaut, Belgium.

It was a municipality of its own before the 1977 fusion of the Belgian municipalities.

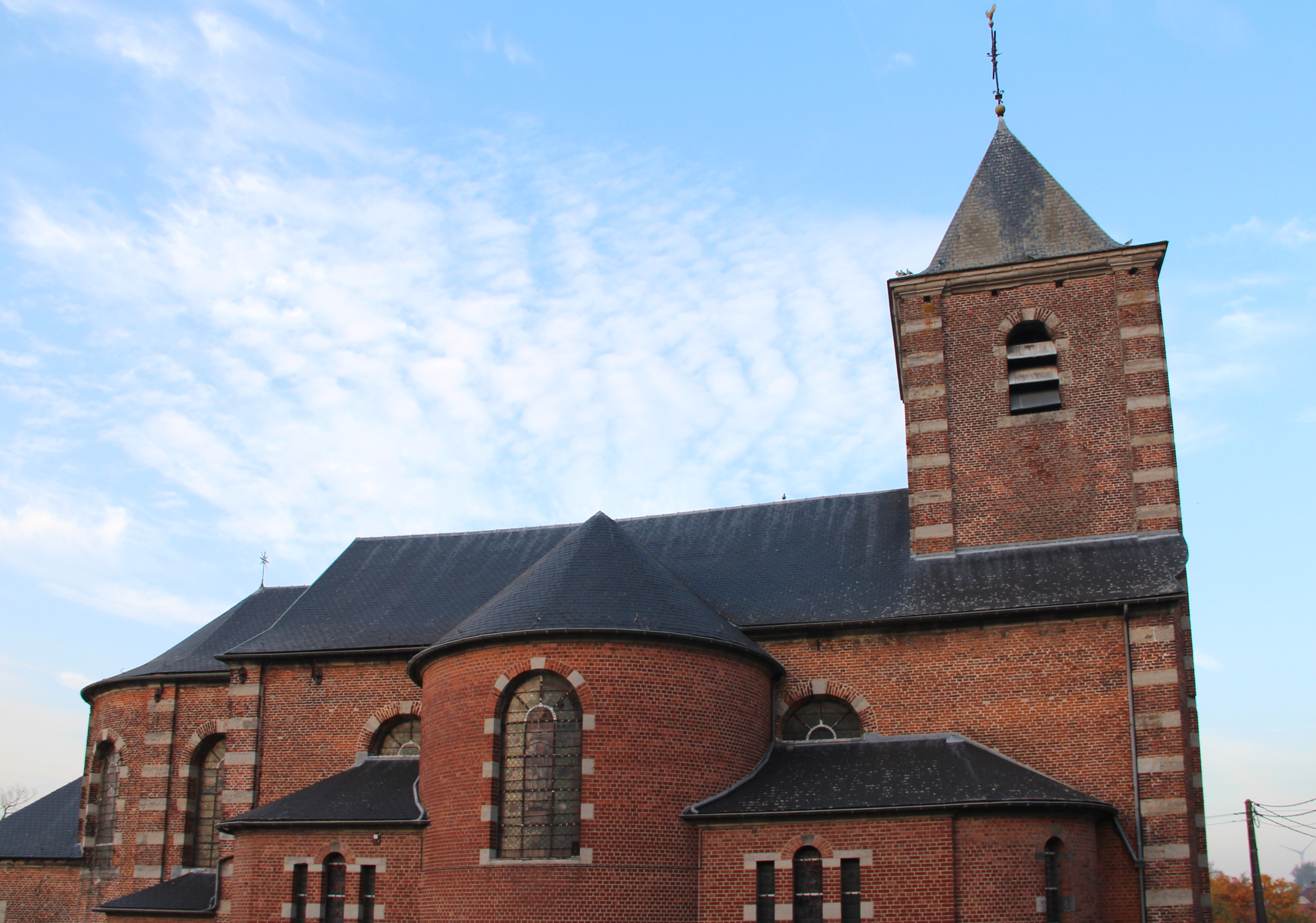
The Saint Bice church.

Wez-Velvain is made of two hamlets named after the Latin word vallis, "a valley", and fel vain, meaning "a fertile plain".

The written form Wez-Velvain existed in 1012 but was later altered as Guiez, Wes-Velvein, Weesh and Velvaing.

In 979, Godefroid le Captif ceded the farms of Neufville to the chapter of the St. Peter abbey in Ghent. The local fortress was burnt down by the Flemings in 1288.

In 1302, Wez was sacked by Gossuin d'Antoing after his enemies had been welcomed there by Anselme d'Aigremont. The fortress was besieged by the Burgundians in 1478 and in 1521 by Baron de Ligne on Charles Quint's behalf.

It was later bought by the bishops of Tournai and eventually demolished in 1820.

The church of Wez-Velvain, built in 1775, was one of the few in the region that was not destroyed by the Germans during the World War I.

== Etymology ==
Wé is a Walloon word meaning « ford ».
