= Jan Ghyselinck =

Belgian road cyclist

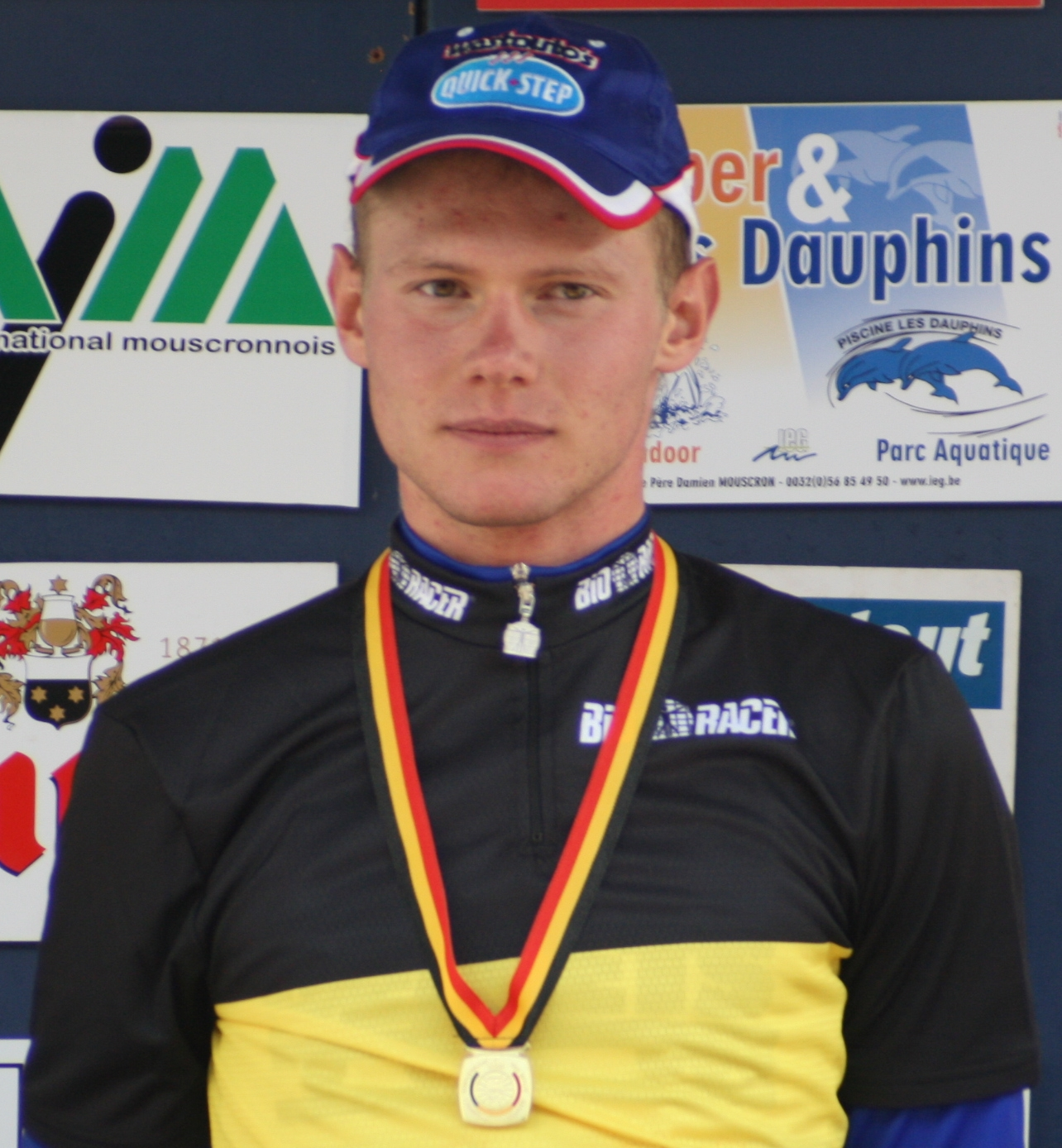
- Ghyselinck at the 2008 Belgian National Time Trial Championships

Personal information
- Full name: Jan Ghyselinck
- Born: 24 February 1988 (age 38) Tielt, Belgium
- Height: 1.83 m (6 ft 0 in)
- Weight: 75 kg (165 lb)

Cycling career
- Sport: Cycling
- Current team: Retired
- Disciplines: Road; Track
- Role: Rider
- Rider type: Time trialist; Classics specialist

Amateur team
- 2008–2009: Beveren 2000

Professional teams
- 2010–2011: Team HTC–Columbia
- 2012–2013: Cofidis
- 2014–2015: Wanty–Groupe Gobert
- 2016: Verandas Willems

Jan Ghyselinck (born 24 February 1988 in Tielt) is a Belgian former professional road cyclist, who rode professionally between 2010 and 2016 for the HTC–Highroad, Cofidis, Wanty–Groupe Gobert and Verandas Willems teams.

He joined Team HTC–Columbia as a neo-pro for the 2010 season, and after some good results he signed a full-contract with the team. Ghyselinck left Cofidis at the end of the 2013 season, and joined Wanty–Groupe Gobert for the 2014 season.

== Major results ==
2005
1st Time trial, National Junior Road Championships
1st Overall Giro della Toscana Juniors

1st Stage 1

1st Ronde van Vlaanderen Juniors
1st Stage 4 Sint-Martinusprijs Kontich
2006
National Junior Road Championships

1st Time trial
3rd Road race

1st Bernaudeau Junior
1st Gent–Menen
7th Paris–Roubaix Juniors
2007
1st Stage 1 (ITT) Tour des Pays de Savoie
2nd Time trial, National Under-23 Road Championships
2008
1st Time trial, National Under-23 Road Championships
3rd Ronde van Vlaanderen U23
3rd Liège–Bastogne–Liège U23
6th Grand Prix de Waregem
2009
1st De Vlaamse Pijl
1st Ronde van Vlaanderen U23
3rd Overall Le Triptyque des Monts et Châteaux

1st Stage 2 (ITT)

3rd Overall Tour de Bretagne
5th Liège–Bastogne–Liège U23
9th Time trial, UEC European Under-23 Road Championships
2012
4th Dwars door Vlaanderen
2013
10th Binche–Chimay–Binche
2014
1st Polynormande
5th Overall Driedaagse van West-Vlaanderen
8th Overall Tour of Belgium
10th Overall Four Days of Dunkirk

=== Grand Tour general classification results timeline ===
Grand Tour	2012
Giro d'Italia	—
Tour de France	152
Vuelta a España	—

Legend
—	Did not compete
DNF	Did not finish
