= Halle–Ingooigem =

Belgian one-day road cycling race

Race details
- Date: Late June
- Region: West Flanders, Belgium
- English name: Halle–Ingooigem
- Local name(s): Halle–Ingooigem (in Dutch)
- Discipline: Road
- Competition: UCI Europe Tour
- Type: Single-day
- Web site: www.halle-ingooigem.be

History
- First edition: 1945
- Editions: 72 (as of 2019)
- First winner: Rik Van Steenbergen (BEL)
- Most wins: 5 riders with 2 wins (Note: The two-time race winners are Belgian riders Dries De Bondt, Bert Roesems and Jurgen Van de Walle, and French riders Nacer Bouhanni and Arnaud Démare.)
- Most recent: Dries De Bondt (BEL)

Halle–Ingooigem is a single-day road bicycle race held annually in June in West Flanders, Belgium. Since 2005, the race is organized as a 1.1 event on the UCI Europe Tour. It was called Brussels–Ingooigem until 2004.

== Winners ==
Year	Country	Rider	Team
1945	Belgium	Rik Van Steenbergen	
1946	Belgium	Edward Van Dijck	
1947	Belgium	Ernest Sterckx	
1948– 1950	No race		
1951	Belgium	Maurice Blomme	
1952	Belgium	Germain Derycke	
1953	Belgium	Jean De Valck	
1954	Belgium	Valère Ollivier	
1955	Belgium	Roger Decock	
1956	Belgium	Jef Schils	
1957	Belgium	Leon Vandaele	
1958	Belgium	Louis Proost	
1959	Belgium	Noël Foré	
1960	Belgium	Oswald Declerck	
1961	Belgium	Georges Decraeye	
1962	Belgium	Benoni Beheyt	
1963	Belgium	Willy Schroeders	
1964	Belgium	Walter Boucquet	
1965	Belgium	Willy Bocklant	
1966	Belgium	Herman Van Springel	
1967	Belgium	Daniel Van Ryckeghem	
1968	Belgium	Romain Furnière	
1969	Belgium	Roger De Vlaeminck	
1970	Belgium	Herman Vrijders	
1971	Belgium	Noël Van Clooster	
1972	Belgium	Tony Gakens	
1973	Belgium	Wilfried David	
1974	Belgium	Patrick Sercu	
1975	Belgium	Marc Meernhout	
1976	Belgium	Jef Jacobs	
1977	Belgium	Walter Planckaert	
1978	Belgium	Dirk Baert	
1979	Belgium	Emile Gijsemans	
1980	Belgium	Frans Van Looy	
1981	Belgium	Johan Wellens	
1982	Netherlands	Adrie Schipper	
1983	Belgium	Eddy Planckaert	
1984	Belgium	Willy Teirlinck	
1985	Belgium	Eddy Vanhaerens	
1986	Belgium	Eric Vanderaerden	
1987	Belgium	Dirk Clarysse	
1988	Belgium	Gino de Backer	
1989	Belgium	Hendrik Redant	
1990	Belgium	Ludo Giesbert	
1991	Belgium	Patrick van Roesbroeck	
1992	Belgium	David Windels	
1993	Belgium	Johan Devos	
1994	Belgium	Eric Van Lancker	
1995	Belgium	Frank Corvers	
1996	Belgium	Erwin Thijs	
1997	Belgium	Michel Vanhaecke	
1998	Russia	Sergei Ivanov	
1999	Belgium	Wim Omloop	
2000	Belgium	Hans De Clercq	
2001	Belgium	Bert Roesems	
2002	Belgium	Danny Daelman	Palmans–Collstrop
2003	Netherlands	Jans Koerts	BankGiroLoterij–Batavus
2004	Belgium	Steven Caethoven	Vlaanderen–T Interim
2005	Belgium	Bert Roesems	Davitamon–Lotto
2006	Australia	Baden Cooke	Unibet.com
2007	Estonia	Janek Tombak	Jartazi–Promo Fashion
2008	Belgium	Gert Steegmans	Quick-Step
2009	Belgium	Jurgen Van de Walle	Quick-Step
2010	Belgium	Jurgen Van de Walle	Quick-Step
2011	Netherlands	Roy Curvers	Skil–Shimano
2012	France	Nacer Bouhanni	FDJ–BigMat
2013	Belgium	Kenny Dehaes	Lotto–Belisol
2014	France	Arnaud Démare	FDJ.fr
2015	France	Nacer Bouhanni	Cofidis
2016	Belgium	Dries De Bondt	Verandas Willems
2017	France	Arnaud Démare	FDJ
2018	Netherlands	Danny van Poppel	LottoNL–Jumbo
2019	Belgium	Dries De Bondt	Corendon–Circus
2020	No race due to the Belgian National Road Race Championships		
2021	No race due to the COVID-19 pandemic in Belgium		
2022	No race due to financial constraints		
