= Belgian National Track Championships =

Track cycling races

- Status: Active
- Genre: Track cycling
- Frequency: Annually
- Location: Vlaams Wielercentrum Eddy Merckx
- Inaugurated: 1894
- Organiser: Royal Belgian Cycling League

The Belgian Track Cycling Championships are a series of competitions to determine who will become Belgian champion in the different parts of track cycling.

Nowadays, the championships are always held at the Flemish Cycling Center Eddy Merckx, one of the two official 250m Olympic tracks in Belgium.

== History ==
Since the first half of the 1900s, national-level track cycling trials were organized, initially limited to speed and pursuit only, then open to various track cycling specialties. Among the multi-titled professionals of these events, Patrick Sercu holds the record with 30 national titles, followed by Kenny De Ketele (22), Jef Scherens (15) and Rik Van Steenbergen (12).

== Winners ==
=== Men ===
==== Madison ====
- 1955: Rik Van Steenbergen & Stan Ockers
- 1955-1960: Not organised
- 1961: Rik Van Steenbergen & Emile Severeyns
- 1962: Rik Van Steenbergen & Emile Severeyns
- 1963: Gilbert Maes & Lucien Demunster
- 1964: Gilbert Maes & Lucien Demunster
- 1965: Theo Verschueren & Robert Lelangue
- 1966: Patrick Sercu & Eddy Merckx
- 1967: Patrick Sercu & Eddy Merckx
- 1968: Patrick Sercu & Eddy Merckx
- 1969: Patrick Sercu & Rik Van Looy
- 1970: Patrick Sercu & Norbert Seeuws
- 1971: Patrick Sercu & Jean-Pierre Monseré
- 1972: Patrick Sercu & Roger De Vlaeminck
- 1973: Patrick Sercu & Julien Stevens
- 1974: Patrick Sercu & Eddy Merckx
- 1975: Patrick Sercu & Eddy Merckx
- 1976: Patrick Sercu & Eddy Merckx
- 1977: Patrick Sercu & Ferdi Van Den Haute
- 1978-1993: Not organised
- 1994: Johnny Dauwe & Patrick Van Hoolandt
- 1995: Wim Beirnaert & Jurgen De Buysschere
- 1996: Not organised
- 1997: Johan Dhaenens & Wilfried Cretskens
- 1998: Luc De Duytsche & Johan Dekkers
- 1999: Luc De Duytsche & Nicky Vermeersch
- 2000: Luc De Duytsche & Nicky Vermeersch
- 2001: Christof Mariën & Steven Thijs
- 2002: Not organised
- 2003: Wouter Van Mechelen & Steven De Neef
- 2004: Steven De Neef & Andries Verspeeten
- 2005: Kenny De Ketele & Steve Schets
- 2006: Not organised
- 2007: Kenny De Ketele & Iljo Keisse
- 2008: Kenny De Ketele & Iljo Keisse
- 2010: Ingmar De Poortere & Steve Schets
- 2011: Gert-Jan Van Immerseel & Iljo Keisse
- 2012: Nicky Cocquyt & Moreno De Pauw
- 2013: Iljo Keisse & Jasper De Buyst
- 2014: Kenny De Ketele & Jasper De Buyst
- 2015: Kenny De Ketele & Jasper De Buyst
- 2016: Kenny De Ketele & Moreno De Pauw
- 2017: Kenny De Ketele & Moreno De Pauw
- 2018: Robbe Ghys & Moreno De Pauw
- 2019: Lindsay De Vylder & Moreno De Pauw
- 2020-2021: Not organised
- 2022: Jules Hesters & Tuur Dens
- 2023: Jules Hesters & Tuur Dens

==== Points ====
- 1980: Tim de Peuter
- 1981: Dirk Heirweg
- 1982: Dirk Heirweg
- 1983-1989: Not organised
- 1990: Cédric Mathy
- 1991-1992: Not organised
- 1993: Günter De Winne
- 1994: Lorenzo Lapage
- 1995: Rik Van Slycke
- 1996: Björn Nachtergaele
- 1997: Tim De Peuter
- 1998: Björn Nachtergaele
- 1999: Tom Jacobs
- 2000: Luc de Duytsche
- 2001: Iljo Keisse
- 2002: Steven De Champs
- 2003: Iljo Keisse
- 2004: Steve Schets
- 2005: Not organised
- 2006: Iljo Keisse
- 2007: Iljo Keisse
- 2008: Iljo Keisse
- 2010: Ingmar De Poortere
- 2011: Ingmar De Poortere
- 2012: Dominique Cornu
- 2013: Jasper De Buyst
- 2014: Moreno De Pauw
- 2015: Laurent Evrard
- 2016: Moreno De Pauw
- 2017: Robbe Ghys
- 2018: Fabio Van Den Bossche
- 2019: Kenny De Ketele
- 2020-2021: Not organised
- 2022: Robbe Ghys
- 2023: Brent Van Mulders

==== Derny ====
- 1961: Rik Van Steenbergen
- 1962: Rik Van Steenbergen
- 1963: Rik Van Steenbergen
- 1964: Rik Van Steenbergen
- 1965: Theo Verschueren
- 1966: Noël Vanclooster
- 1967: Leo Proost
- 1968: Theo Verschueren
- 1969: Theo Verschueren
- 1970: Theo Verschueren
- 1971: Theo Verschueren
- 1972: Ferdinand Bracke
- 1973: Theo Verschueren
- 1974-1975: Not organised
- 1976: Patrick Sercu
- 1977: Freddy Maertens
- 1978: Rik Van Linden
- 1979: Rik Van Linden
- 1980: Not organised
- 1981: Willy De Geest
- 1982-1993: Not organised
- 1994: Rikkie Matthyssens
- 1995: Not organised
- 1996: Jurgen De Buysschere
- 1997-1998: Not organised
- 1999: Laurent De Paoli
- 2000-2002: Not organised
- 2003: Steven De Neef
- 2004-2006: Not organised
- 2007: Kenny De Ketele
- 2008: Kenny De Ketele
- 2009: Kenny De Ketele
- 2010: Tim Mertens
- 2011: Iljo Keisse
- 2012: Jonathan Breyne
- 2013: Jonathan Breyne
- 2014-2017: Not organised
- 2018: Fabio Van Den Bossche
- 2019: Jules Hesters

==== Keirin ====
- 2000: Björn Nachtergaele
- 2001: Björn Nachtergaele
- 2002: Not organisede
- 2003: Dimitri De Fauw
- 2004: Dominique Perissi
- 2005-2011: Not organised
- 2012: Kim Van Leemput
- 2013: Robin Venneman
- 2014: Joris Cornet
- 2015: Not organised
- 2016: Robin Venneman
- 2017: Ayrton De Pauw
- 2018: Ayrton De Pauw
- 2019: Tuur Dens
- 2020-2021: Not organised
- 2022: Runar De Schrijver
- 2023: Runar De Schrijver

==== 1 km time trial ====
- 1966: Paul Seye
- 1967: Daniel Goens
- 1968: Dirk Baert
- 1969: Willy De Bosscher
- 1970: Georges Claes
- 1971: Manu Snellinx
- 1972: Robert Maveau
- 1974: Paul Clinckaert
- 1975: Hugo Maréchal
- 1976: Michel Vaarten
- 1977: Michel Vaarten
- 1978: Jean-Louis Baugnies
- 1979: Charles Jochums
- 1980: Jan Blomme
- 1981: Diederik Foubert
- 1982: Jan Blomme
- 1983: Diederik Foubert
- 1984: Frank Orban
- 1985: Sven Vandevoorde
- 1986: Dominique Dejosé
- 1987: Dominique Dejosé
- 1988: Dominique Dejosé
- 1989: Erik Schoefs
- 1990: Erik Schoefs
- 1991: Dominique Dejosé
- 1992: Tom Steels
- 1993: Erik Schoefs
- 1994: Gunter De Winne
- 1995: Wim Van Rengen
- 1996: Wim Van Rengen
- 1997: Wim Van Rengen
- 1998: Luc De Duytsche
- 1999: Wim Van Rengen
- 2000: Jan Blomme
- 2001: Dimitri De Fauw
- 2002: Dimitri De Fauw
- 2003: Dimitri De Fauw
- 2004: Kenny De Ketele
- 2005: Not organised
- 2006: Kenny De Ketele
- 2007: Not organised
- 2008: Kenny De Ketele
- 2009: Tim Mertens
- 2010: Justin Van Hoecke
- 2011: Joris Cornet
- 2013: Moreno De Pauw
- 2014: Moreno De Pauw
- 2015: Moreno De Pauw
- 2016: Ayrton De Pauw
- 2017: Lindsay De Vylder
- 2018: Tuur Dens
- 2019: Tuur Dens
- 2020-2021: Not organised
- 2022: Arthur Senrame
- 2023: Tuur Dens

==== Omnium ====
- 1941: Albert Buysse
- 1942: Frans Cools
- 1943: Frans Cools
- 1944: Rik Van Steenbergen
- 1945-1954: Not organised
- 1955: Rik Van Steenbergen
- 1956-1960: Not organised
- 1961: Rik Van Steenbergen
- 1962: Not organised
- 1963: Rik Van Steenbergen
- 1964: Not organised
- 1965: Patrick Sercu
- 1966: Patrick Sercu
- 1967: Patrick Sercu
- 1968: Patrick Sercu
- 1969: Robert Lelangue
- 1970: Jean-Pierre Monseré
- 1971: Patrick Sercu
- 1972: Patrick Sercu
- 1974: Patrick Sercu
- 1975: Patrick Sercu
- 1976: Patrick Sercu
- 1977: Patrick Sercu
- 1978: Patrick Sercu
- 1979: Patrick Sercu
- 1980: Ferdi Van Den Haute
- 1981: Stan Tourné
- 1982: Diederik Foubert
- 1983: Ferdi Van Den Haute
- 1984: Dirk Baert
- 1985: Not organised
- 1986: Michel Vaarten
- 1987: Étienne De Wilde
- 1988: Erwin Verfaillie
- 1989: Étienne De Wilde
- 1990: Rik Van Slycke
- 1991: Sammie Moreels
- 1991-1995: Not organised
- 1996: Wime Van Rengen
- 1997: Luc de Duytsche
- 1998: Peter Van Petegem
- 2000: Wouter Van Mechelen
- 2001: Jan Meeusen
- 2004: Ingmar De Poortere
- 2006: Dimitri De Fauw
- 2007: Kenny De Ketele
- 2008: Tim Mertens
- 2010: Nicky Cocquyt
- 2011: Nicky Cocquyt
- 2012: Gijs Van Hoecke
- 2013: Moreno De Pauw
- 2014: Moreno De Pauw
- 2015: Moreno De Pauw
- 2016: Moreno De Pauw
- 2017: Moreno De Pauw
- 2018: Lindsay De Vylder
- 2019: Lindsay De Vylder
- 2020-2021: Not organised
- 2022 Fabio Van Den Bossche
- 2023: Tuur Dens

==== Pursuit (individual) ====
- 1939: Karel Kaers
- 1940: Martin Van Den Broeck
- 1941: Maurice Clautier
- 1942: Raoul Breuskin
- 1943: Raoul Breuskin
- 1944: Rik Van Steenbergen
- 1945: René Adriaenssens
- 1946: René Adriaenssens
- 1947: René Adriaenssens
- 1948: Achiel De Backer
- 1949: Leon Jomaux
- 1950: Joseph De Beuckelaer
- 1951: Joseph De Beuckelaer
- 1952: Raphaël Glorieux
- 1953: Raphaël Glorieux
- 1954: Paul Depaepe
- 1955: Paul Depaepe
- 1956: Jean Brankart
- 1957: Julien Van Oostende
- 1958: Jean Brankart
- 1959: Jean Brankart
- 1960: Piet Oellibrandt
- 1961: Piet Oellibrandt
- 1962: Piet Oellibrandt
- 1963: Hugo Scrayen
- 1964: Hugo Scrayen
- 1965: Ferdinand Bracke
- 1966: Theo Mertens
- 1967: Ferdinand Bracke
- 1968: Julien Stevens
- 1969: Norbert Seeuws
- 1970: Dirk Baert
- 1971: Paul Crapez
- 1972: Ferdinand Bracke
- 1973: Ferdinand Bracke
- 1974: Dirk Baert
- 1975: Dirk Baert
- 1976: Dirk Baert
- 1977: Dirk Baert
- 1978-1980: Not organised
- 1981: Dirk Baert
- 1982: Stan Tourné
- 1983-1987: Not organised
- 1988: Benjamin Van Itterbeeck
- 1989: Lorenzo Lapage
- 1990: Luc Govaerts
- 1991: Stan Tourné
- 1992-1993: Not organised
- 1994: Günter De Winne
- 1995: Marc Streel
- 1996: Cédric Flasse
- 1997: Tim De Peuter
- 1998: Luc De Duytsche
- 1999: Kim Baetens
- 2000: Jan Meeusen
- 2001: Bert Roesems
- 2002: John Van den Abeele
- 2003: Iljo Keisse
- 2004: Kenny De Ketele
- 2005: Not organised
- 2006: Dominique Cornu
- 2007: Dominique Cornu
- 2008: Kenny De Ketele
- 2010: Dominique Cornu
- 2011: Jonathan Dufrasne
- 2013: Jonas Rickaert
- 2014: Dominique Cornu
- 2015: Jonathan Dufrasne
- 2016: Victor Campenaerts
- 2017: Bryan Boussaer
- 2018: Bryan Boussaer
- 2019: Rune Herregodts
- 2020-2022: Not organised
- 2023: Thibaut Bernard

==== Pursuit (team) ====
- 2000: Luc De Duytsche, Nicky Vermeersch, Andries Verspeeten & Kenneth Van de Wiele
- 2001: Christof Mariën, Jan Meeusen, Steven Thijs & Sven Vervloet
- 2002-2005: Not organised
- 2006: Tim Mertens, Ingmar De Poortere, Kenny De Ketele & Steve Schets
- 2007: Tim Mertens, Ingmar De Poortere, Kenny De Ketele & Dominique Cornu
- 2008: Tim Mertens, Ingmar De Poortere, Kenny De Ketele & Dominique Cornu
- 2009: Tim Mertens, Ingmar De Poortere, Stijn Steels & Jeroen Lepla
- 2010: Jonathan Dufrasne, Ingmar De Poortere, Kenny De Ketele & Steve Schets
- 2011: Jonathan Dufrasne, Ingmar De Poortere, Gijs Van Hoecke & Justin Van Hoecke
- 2012: Not organised
- 2013: Tiesj Benoot, Aimé De Gendt, Jonas Rickaert & Otto Vergaerde

==== Scratch ====
- 2002: Steven De Champs
- 2003: Dimitri De Fauw
- 2004: John Van den Abeele
- 2005: Not organised
- 2006: Steve Schets
- 2007: Ingmar De Poortere
- 2008: Tim Mertens
- 2009: Tim Mertens
- 2010: Tim Mertens
- 2011: Iljo Keisse
- 2012: Dominique Cornu
- 2013: Iljo Keisse
- 2014: Killian Michiels
- 2015: Moreno De Pauw
- 2016: Bryan Boussaer
- 2017: Moreno De Pauw
- 2018: Robbe Ghys
- 2019: Lindsay De Vylder
- 2020-2021: Not organised
- 2022: Jules Hesters
- 2023: Lindsay De Vylder

==== Sprint (individual) ====
- 1894: Émile Huet
- 1895: Émile Huet
- 1896-1987: Not organised
- 1898: Charles Van Den Born
- 1899: Louis Grogna
- 1900: Claude Leclercq
- 1901: Charles Van Den Born
- 1902: Not organised
- 1903: Louis Grogna
- 1904: Ernest Massart
- 1905: Charles Van Den Born
- 1906: Charles Van Den Born
- 1907: Charles Van Den Born
- 1908: Charles Van Den Born
- 1909: Charles Van Den Born
- 1910: Albert Herent
- 1911: Hubert Wilmots
- 1912: Emile Otto
- 1913: Jozef Van Bever
- 1914: Emile Otto
- 1915-1918: Not organised
- 1919: Jozef Van Bever
- 1920: Jozef Van Bever
- 1921: Jules Dossche
- 1922: Alois De Graeve
- 1923: Alois De Graeve
- 1924: Alois De Graeve
- 1925: Alois De Graeve
- 1926: Emile Otto
- 1927: Alois De Graeve
- 1928: Alois De Graeve
- 1929: Alois De Graeve
- 1930: Jacques Arlet
- 1931: Jef Scherens
- 1932: Jef Scherens
- 1933: Jef Scherens
- 1934: Jef Scherens
- 1935: Jef Scherens
- 1936: Jef Scherens
- 1937: Jef Scherens
- 1938: Jef Scherens
- 1939: Jef Scherens
- 1940: Frans Cools
- 1941: Jef Scherens
- 1942: Jef Scherens
- 1943: Emile Gosselin
- 1944: Jef Scherens
- 1945: Jef Scherens
- 1946: Jef Scherens
- 1947: Jef Scherens
- 1948: Frans Van Looveren
- 1949: Raymond Pauwels
- 1950: Raymond Pauwels
- 1951: Emile Gosselin
- 1952: Emile Gosselin
- 1953: Emile Gosselin
- 1954: Emile Gosselin
- 1955: Emile Gosselin
- 1956: Emile Gosselin
- 1957: Jos De Bakker
- 1958: Jos De Bakker
- 1959: Jos De Bakker
- 1960: Jos De Bakker
- 1961: Jos De Bakker
- 1962: Jos De Bakker
- 1963: Jos De Bakker
- 1964: Leo Sterckx
- 1965: Patrick Sercu
- 1966: Jos De Bakker
- 1967: Patrick Sercu
- 1968: Patrick Sercu
- 1969: Patrick Sercu
- 1970: Robert Van Lancker
- 1971: Robert Van Lancker
- 1972: Robert Van Lancker
- 1973: Robert Van Lancker
- 1974: Robert Van Lancker
- 1975: Raphaël Constant
- 1976: Robert Van Lancker
- 1977: Willy Debosscher
- 1978-1980: Not organised
- 1981: Michel Vaarten
- 1982: Michel Vaarten
- 1983-1992: Not organised
- 1993: Erik Schoefs
- 1994: Erik Schoefs
- 1995: Erik Schoefs
- 1996: Wim Van Rengen
- 1997: Mario Ghyselinck
- 1998: Luc De Duytsche
- 1999: Wim Van Rengen
- 2000: Dimitri De Fauw
- 2001: Dimitri De Fauw
- 2002: Dimitri De Fauw
- 2003: Dimitri De Fauw
- 2004: Dominique Perissi
- 2005-2011: Not organised
- 2012: Kim Van Leemput
- 2013-2014: Not organised
- 2015: Matthias Oseï Vertez
- 2016: Robin Venneman
- 2017: Ayrton De Pauw
- 2018: Ayrton De Pauw
- 2019: Gerald Nys
- 2020-2021: Not organised
- 2022: Arthur Senrame
- 2023: Runar De Schrijver

==== Sprint (team) ====
- 2000: Dimitri De Fauw, Luc De Duytsche & Nicky Vermeersch
- 2001: John Van Den Abeele, Jurgen Van Loocke & Andries Verspeeten
- 2002-2012: Not organised
- 2013: Laurent Wernimont, Otto Vergaerde & Robin Venneman

==== Elimination ====
- 2016: Moreno De Pauw, Killian Michiels & Bryan Boussaer
- 2017-2021: Not organised
- 2022: Jules Hesters, Milan Fretin & Mathias Lefeber
- 2023: Jules Hesters, Gianluca Pollefiet & Arthur Senrame

=== Woman ===
==== 500 m time trial ====
- 1993: Patsy Maegerman
- 1994: Annick Geeraert
- 1995: Annick Geeraert
- 1996: Annick Geeraert
- 1997: Annick Geeraert
- 1998: Annick Geeraert
- 1999: Not organised
- 2000: Evy Van Damme
- 2001: Ingeborg Marx
- 2002: Not organised
- 2003: Karen Verbeek
- 2004-2005: Not organised
- 2006: Jolien D'Hoore
- 2007: Jolien D'Hoore
- 2008: Jolien D'Hoore
- 2009: Jolien D'Hoore
- 2010: Jolien D'Hoore
- 2011: Gilke Croket
- 2012: Nathalie Verschelden
- 2013: Kelly Druyts
- 2014: Kelly Druyts
- 2015: Jolien D'Hoore
- 2016: Jolien D'Hoore
- 2017: Nicky Degrendele
- 2018-2022: Not organised
- 2023: Valerie Jenaer

==== Points ====
- 1992: Patsy Maegerman
- 1993: Kristel Werckx
- 1994: Kristel Werckx
- 1995: Evelyne Baert
- 1996: Veronique Coene
- 1997: Maria Coomans
- 1998: Linda Troyekens
- 1999: Evy Van Damme
- 2000: Evy Van Damme
- 2001: Nele Van Den Bossche
- 2002: Not organised
- 2003: Leen Van Kerckhoven
- 2004-2005: Not organised
- 2006: Hannah Verhaeghe
- 2007: Kelly Druyts
- 2008: Sharon Vandromme
- 2009: Kelly Druyts
- 2010: Jessie Daams
- 2011: Kelly Druyts
- 2012: Else Belmans
- 2013: Kelly Druyts
- 2014: Demmy Druyts
- 2015: Jolien D'Hoore
- 2016: Lotte Kopecky
- 2017: Annelies Dom
- 2018: Lotte Kopecky
- 2019: Jolien D'Hoore
- 2020-2021: Not organised
- 2022: Katrijn De Clercq
- 2023: Lotte Kopecky

==== Keirin ====
- 2007: Kelly Druyts
- 2008: Kelly Druyts
- 2009: Dorien van der Velden
- 2010: Eline De Roover
- 2011: Gilke Croket
- 2012: Not organised
- 2013: Sarah Inghelbrecht
- 2014: Nicky Degrendele
- 2015: Nicky Degrendele
- 2016: Nicky Degrendele
- 2017: Nicky Degrendele
- 2018-2021: Not organised
- 2022: Nicky Degrendele
- 2023: Nicky Degrendele

==== Omnium ====
- 1987: Marie-Line Hajdu
- 1988: Not organised
- 1989: Kristel Werckx
- 1990: Kristel Werckx
- 1991: Kristel Werckx
- 1992: Kristel Werckx
- 1993: Patsy Maegerman
- 1994: Kristel Werckx
- 1995: Evelyne Baert
- 1996: Evelyne Baert
- 1997: Linda Troyekens
- 1998: Evy Van Damme
- 1999: Nele Van Den Bossche
- 2000: Ine Wannijn
- 2001: Nele Van Den Bossche
- 2002: Not organised
- 2003: Karen Verbeek
- 2004: Karen Verbeek
- 2005: Not organised
- 2006: Hannah Verhaeghe
- 2007: Jolien D'Hoore
- 2009: Kelly Druyts
- 2009: Kelly Druyts
- 2010: Jolien D'Hoore
- 2011: Kelly Druyts
- 2012: Jolien D'Hoore
- 2013: Els Belmans
- 2014: Jolien D'Hoore
- 2015: Jolien D'Hoore
- 2016: Lotte Kopecky
- 2017: Lotte Kopecky
- 2018: Lotte Kopecky
- 2019: Shari Bossuyt
- 2020-2021: Not organised
- 2022: Katrijn De Clercq
- 2023: Lotte Kopecky

==== Pursuit (individual) ====
- 1959: Yvonne Reynders
- 1960: Marie-Therese Naessens
- 1961: Yvonne Reynders
- 1962: Marie-Therese Naessens
- 1963: Yvonne Reynders
- 1964: Yvonne Reynders
- 1965: Yvonne Reynders
- 1966: Yvonne Reynders
- 1967: Yvonne Reynders
- 1968: Not organised
- 1969: Suzanne Sohie
- 1970-1973: Not organised
- 1974: Nicole Vandenbroeck
- 1975: Nicole Vandenbroeck
- 1976: Nicole Vandenbroeck
- 1977: Nicole Vandenbroeck
- 1978: Frieda Maes
- 1979: Chantal Van Havere
- 1980: Chantal Van Havere
- 1981: Gerda Sierens
- 1982: Jenny De Smet
- 1983: Jenny De Smet
- 1984: An Callebout
- 1985: An Callebout
- 1986: Agnès Dussart
- 1987: Marie-Line Hajdu
- 1988: Kristel Werckx
- 1989: Marie-Line Hajdu
- 1990: Kristel Werckx
- 1991: Kristel Werckx
- 1992: Kristel Werckx
- 1993: Evelyne Baert
- 1994: Kristel Werckx
- 1995: Evelyne Baert
- 1996: Linda Troyekens
- 1997: Linda Troyekens
- 1998: Linda Troyekens
- 1999: Not organised
- 2000: Evy Van Damme
- 2001: Nele Van Den Bossche
- 2002: Not organised
- 2003: Karen Verbeek
- 2004-2005: Not organised
- 2006: Kelly Druyts
- 2007: Kelly Druyts
- 2008: Jolien D'Hoore
- 2009: Kelly Druyts
- 2010: Jolien D'Hoore
- 2011: Kelly Druyts
- 2012: Else Belmans
- 2013: Lotte Kopecky
- 2014: Lotte Kopecky
- 2015: Jolien D'Hoore
- 2016: Lotte Kopecky
- 2017: Lotte Kopecky
- 2018: Annelies Dom
- 2019: Jolien D'Hoore
- 2020-2022: Not organised
- 2023: Lotte Kopecky

==== Pursuit (team) ====
- 2007: Jolien D'Hoore, Elke Vanderhauweraert & Annelies Van Doorslaer
- 2008: Kelly Druyts, Jolien D'Hoore & Evelyn Arys
- 2009: Kelly Druyts, Jolien D'Hoore & Jessie Daams
- 2010: Kelly Druyts, Jolien D'Hoore & Jessie Daams
- 2011: Kelly Druyts, Else Belmans & Maaike Polspoel
- 2012: Shauni Corthout, Steffi Lodewijks & Eline De Roover
- 2013: Sarah Inghelbrecht, Gilke Croket & Stephanie De Croock

==== Scratch ====
- 2003: Fauve Defloor
- 2004-2006: Not organised
- 2007: Jolien D'Hoore
- 2008: Kelly Druyts
- 2009: Jessie Daams
- 2010: Jolien D'Hoore
- 2011: Kelly Druyts
- 2012: Else Belmans
- 2013: Gilke Croket
- 2014: Kelly Druyts
- 2015: Jolien D'Hoore
- 2016: Lotte Kopecky
- 2017: Lotte Kopecky
- 2018: Saartje Vandenbroucke
- 2019: Jolien D'Hoore
- 2020-2021: Not organised
- 2022: Marith Vanhove
- 2023: Marith Vanhove

==== Sprint (individual) ====
- 1959: Victoire Van Nuffel
- 1960: Marie-Therese Naessens
- 1961: Marie-Therese Naessens
- 1962: Marie-Therese Naessens
- 1963: Marie-Therese Naessens
- 1964: Louisa Smits
- 1965: Christiane Goeminne
- 1966: Yvonne Reynders
- 1967: Christiane Goeminne
- 1968: Not organised
- 1969: Christiane Goeminne
- 1970-1973: Not organised
- 1974: Linda Rombouts
- 1975: Christiane Goeminne
- 1976: Christiane Goeminne
- 1977: Viviane Bailly
- 1978: Frieda Maes
- 1979: Frieda Maes
- 1980: Claudine Vierstraete
- 1981: Claudine Vierstraete
- 1982: Claudine Vierstraete
- 1983: Claudine Vierstraete
- 1984: Claudine Vierstraete
- 1985: Sofia Commeyne
- 1986: Claudine Vierstraete
- 1987: Kristel Werckx
- 1988: Kristel Werckx
- 1989: Martine Schotte
- 1990: Kristel Werckx
- 1991: Kristel Werckx
- 1992: Patsy Maegerman
- 1993: Kristel Werckx
- 1994: Annick Geeraert
- 1995: An Philipsen
- 1996: Annick Geeraert
- 1997: Annick Geeraert
- 1998: An Philipsen
- 1999: Not organised
- 2000: Evy Van Damme
- 2001: Ingeborg Marx
- 2002: Not organised
- 2003: Kim Schoonbaert
- 2004-2006: Not organised
- 2007: Jolien D'Hoore
- 2008: Jolien D'Hoore
- 2009: Elodie Andre
- 2010: Steffi Lodewijks
- 2011-2012: Not organised
- 2013: Shana Dalving
- 2014: Nicky Degrendele
- 2015-2016: Not organised
- 2017: Nicky Degrendele
- 2018-2022: Not organised
- 2023: Nicky Degrendele

==== Sprint (team) ====
- 2007: Kelly Druyts & Jenifer De Merlier
- 2008: Kelly Druyts & Jolien D'Hoore
- 2009: Kelly Druyts & Jolien D'Hoore
- 2010: Kelly Druyts & Jolien D'Hoore
- 2011: Gilke Croket & Morgane Van Lierde
- 2012: Shauni Corthout & Steffi Lodewijks
- 2013: Shana Dalving & Steffi Lodewyks
- 2014-2022: Not organised
- 2023: Zoë Wolfs & Julie Nicolaes

==== Elimination ====
- 2022: Shari Bossuyt, Katrijn De Clercq & Marith Vanhove
- 2023: Lotte Kopecky, Katrijn De Clercq & Hélène Hesters
