= 1934 UCI Road World Championships – Men's road race =

Men's Individual Road Race
1934 UCI Road World Championships
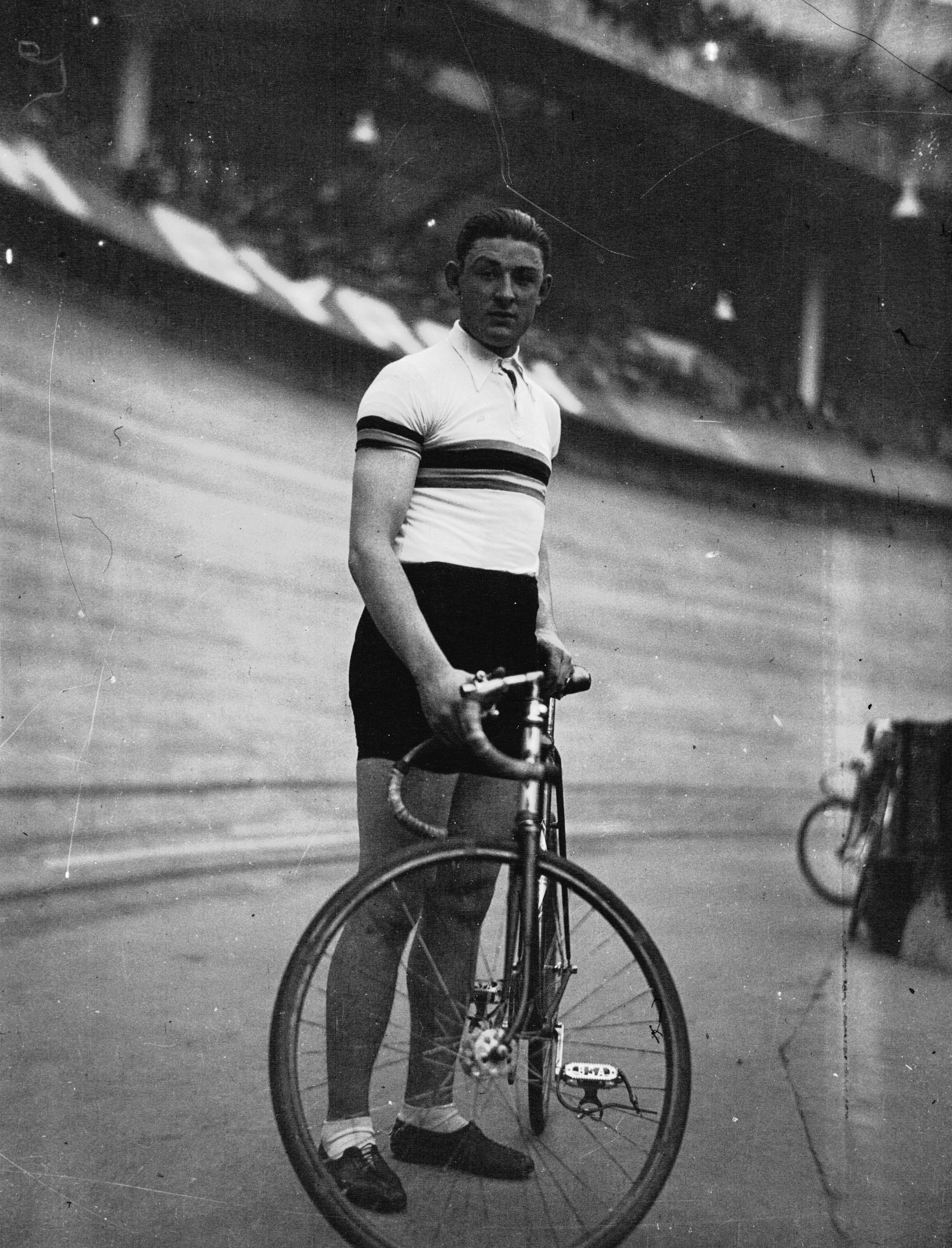
- Karel Kaers with the rainbow jersey

Race details
- Dates: 18 August 1934
- Stages: 1
- Distance: 225.6 km (140.2 mi)
- Winning time: 5h 56' 15"

Results
	Winner	Karel Kaers (BEL)	(Belgium)
	Second	Learco Guerra (ITA)	(Italy)
	Third	Gustave Danneels (BEL)	(Belgium)

The men's road race at the 1934 UCI Road World Championships was the eighth edition of the event. The race took place on Saturday 18 August 1934 in Leipzig, Germany. The race was won by Karel Kaers of Belgium.

== Final classification ==
General classification (1–10)

Rank	Rider	Time
1st place, gold medalist(s)	Karel Kaers (BEL)	5h 56' 15"
2nd place, silver medalist(s)	Learco Guerra (ITA)	+ 0"
3rd place, bronze medalist(s)	Gustave Danneels (BEL)	+ 0"
4	Gerhard Huschke (GER)	+ 0"
5	Gerrit van de Ruit (NED)	+ 0"
6	Paul Egli (SUI)	+ 0"
7	Josy Kraus (LUX)	+ 0"
8	Thijs van Oers (NED)	+ 0"
9	Hans Gilgen (SUI)	+ 0"
10	Mariano Cañardo (ESP)	+ 0"
