= Acht van Chaam =

Dutch cycling event

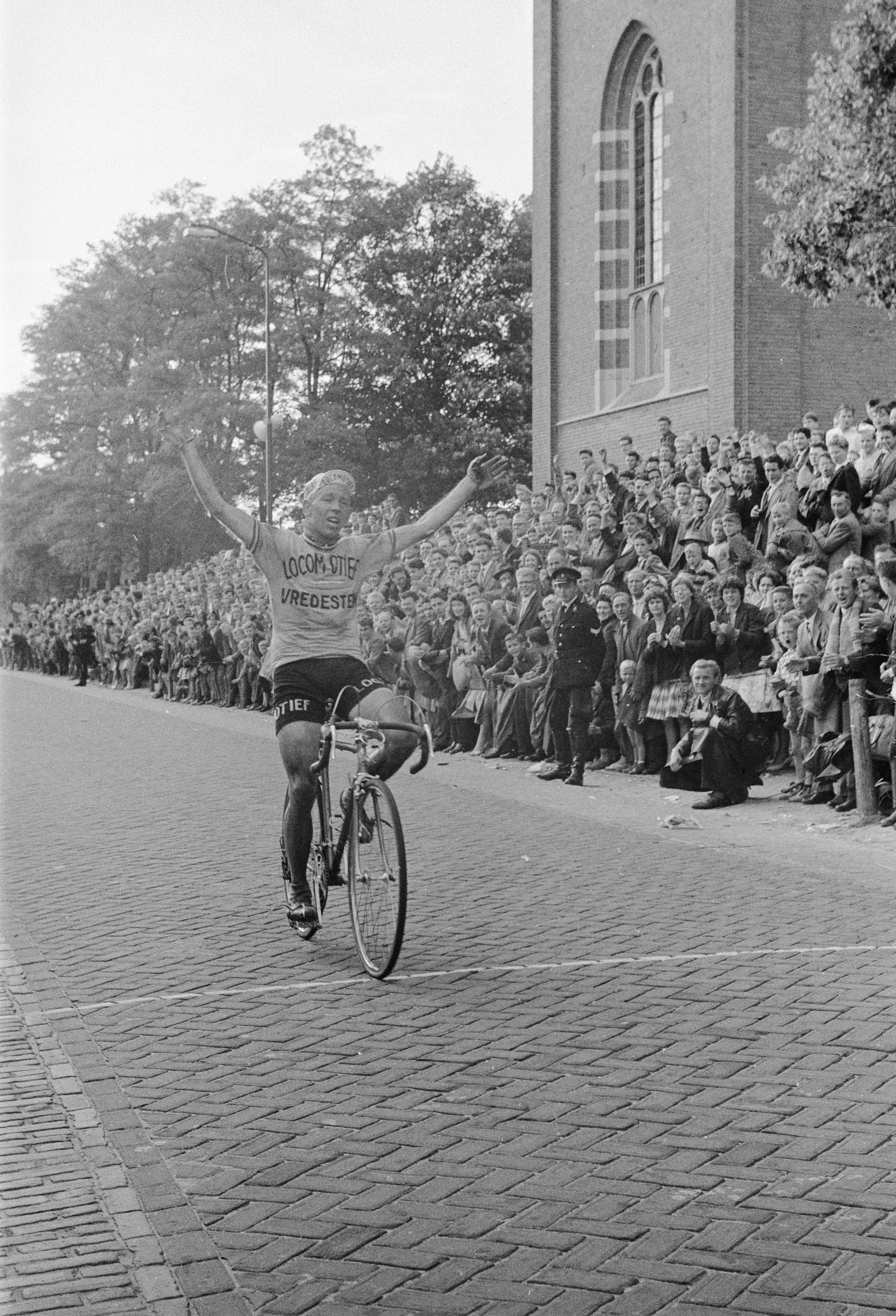

Race details
- Date: End of July
- Region: Chaam, Netherlands
- English name: Eight of Chaam
- Local name: Acht van Chaam (in Dutch)
- Discipline: Road race
- Type: Criterium
- Web site: www.8vanchaam.nl

History
- First edition: Men: 1932; Women: 2001
- Editions: Men: 75 (as of 2013); Women: 12 (as of 2012)
- First winner: Men; Matthijs van Oers (NED); Women; Monique Knol (NED)
- Most wins: Men; Karel Kaers (BEL); Rik Van Steenbergen (BEL); Jo de Roo (NED); 3 wins Women; Leontien van Moorsel (NED); Marianne Vos (NED); 3 wins
- Most recent: Men; Egan Bernal (COL); Women; Nina Kessler (NED)

Acht van Chaam (English: Eight of Chaam) is an elite men's and women's professional road bicycle racing event held annually in Chaam, Netherlands. The first edition was in 1932 and since 1992 the event also includes a women's race.

== Results ==
=== Men ===
Year	Winner	Second	Third
1933	(Netherlands) Matthijs van Oers	(Netherlands) Armand Haesendonck	(Belgium) Frans Dictus
1934	(Belgium) Frans Dictus	(Belgium) Edward Vissers	(Belgium) Camiel Michielsen
1935	(Belgium) Karel Kaers	(Netherlands) Cees Pellenaars	(Belgium) Frans Dictus
1936	(Belgium) Karel Kaers	(Belgium) Alfons Korthout	(Belgium) Frans Spiessens
1937	(Netherlands) Gerrit Van De Ruit	(Netherlands) Theo Middelkamp	(Netherlands) Frans Slaats
1938	(Belgium) Karel Kaers	(Netherlands) Gerrit Schulte	(Netherlands) Theo Middelkamp
1939	(Netherlands) Gerrit Schulte	(Netherlands) John Braspenninckx	(Netherlands) Janus Hellemans
1940	(Netherlands) Cor de Groot	(Netherlands) Cees Valentijn	(Belgium) Frans Pauwels
1941–46	no race due to World War II		
1947	(Netherlands) Cees Joosen	(Netherlands) Piet van As	(Netherlands) Louis Motké
1948	(Netherlands) André de Korver	(Netherlands) Theo Hopstaken	(Netherlands) Cees Joosen
1949	(Netherlands) John Braspenningcx	(Netherlands) Joep Savelsberg	(Netherlands) Piet van As
1950	(Netherlands) Wout Wagtmans	(Netherlands) Gérard van Beek	(Netherlands) Gerrit Voorting
1951	(Belgium) Karel Leysen	(Netherlands) Henk Faanhof	(Belgium) René Mertens
1952	(Netherlands) Wout Wagtmans	(Netherlands) Gerrit Voorting	(Netherlands) Piet van As
1953	(Netherlands) Wim van Est	(Netherlands) Gerrit Voorting	(Netherlands) Adri Voorting
1954	(Netherlands) Gerrit Voorting	(Netherlands) Wim van Est	(Belgium) Marcel Janssens
1955	(Netherlands) Wim van Est	(Netherlands) Jan Konings	(Netherlands) Gijs Pauw
1956	(Belgium) Rik Van Steenbergen	(Netherlands) Gerrit Schulte	(Netherlands) Gerrit Voorting
1957	(Netherlands) Frans Mahn	(Netherlands) Leo van de Brand	(Netherlands) Bran van Sluijs
1958	(Belgium) Rik Van Steenbergen	(Netherlands) Wim van Est	(Belgium) Leo Prost
1959	(Netherlands) Joop van der Putten	(Netherlands) Leo van der Pluym	(Netherlands) Bram Kool
1960	(Belgium) Rik Van Steenbergen	(Netherlands) Albert van Egmond	(Netherlands) Piet Damen
1961	(Belgium) Rik Luyten	(France) Joseph Groussard	(Netherlands) Piet Damen
1962	(Belgium) Willy Vannitsen	(Belgium) Rik Luyten	(Netherlands) Joop van der Putten
1963	(Netherlands) Jo de Roo	(Belgium) Guillaume Van Tongerloo	(Netherlands) Wim van Est
1964	(Netherlands) Jo de Roo	(Netherlands) Jan Boonen	(Netherlands) Jaap Kersten
1965	(Netherlands) Cees Lute	(Netherlands) Gerben Karstens	(Netherlands) Peter Post
1966	(Netherlands) Gerben Karstens	(Belgium) Jozef Verachtert	(Belgium) Rik Luyten
1967	(Netherlands) Jo de Roo	(Netherlands) Gerard Vianen	(Netherlands) John Brouwer
1968	(Netherlands) Marinus Wagtmans	(Netherlands) Jan Janssen	(Netherlands) Cees Zoontjens
1969	(Netherlands) Jan van Katwijk	(Netherlands) Gerben Karstens	(Netherlands) Jan Harings
1970	(Netherlands) Jan Krekels	(Netherlands) Harry Stevens	(Netherlands) Leen Poortvliet
1971	(Netherlands) Marinus Wagtmans	(Belgium) Gustaaf Van Roosbroeck	(Netherlands) Gerard Harings
1972	(Netherlands) Tino Tabak	(Luxembourg) Marian Polansky	(Netherlands) Jos van der Vleuten
1973	(Netherlands) Joop Zoetemelk	(Netherlands) Gerben Karstens	(Netherlands) Henk Benjamins
1974	(Netherlands) Piet van Katwijk	(Netherlands) Albert Hulzebosch	(Netherlands) Jos Schipper
1975	(Netherlands) Tino Tabak	(Netherlands) Joop Zoetemelk	(Belgium) Patrick Sercu
1976	(Netherlands) Aad van den Hoek	(Belgium) Ronald De Witte	(Netherlands) Hennie Kuiper
1977	(West Germany) Dietrich Thurau	(Belgium) Rik Van Linden	(Belgium) Wilfried Wesemael
1978	(Netherlands) Gerrie Knetemann	(Netherlands) Jan Raas	(Netherlands) Theo Smit
1979	(Netherlands) Gerrie Knetemann	(Netherlands) Jan Raas	(Netherlands) Hennie Kuiper
1980	(Netherlands) Jan Raas	(Netherlands) Leo van Vliet	(Netherlands) Piet van Katwijk
1981	(Netherlands) Roy Schuiten	(Netherlands) Johan van der Velde	(Netherlands) Adri van Houwelingen
1982	(Netherlands) Johan van der Velde	(Netherlands) Peter Winnen	(Netherlands) Jan Raas
1983	(Netherlands) Henk Lubberding	(Netherlands) Frits Pirard	(Netherlands) Jan Raas
1984	(Netherlands) Jacques Hanegraaf	(Netherlands) Gerard Veldscholten	(Netherlands) Leo van Vliet
1985	(Belgium) Eddy Planckaert	(Netherlands) Adri van der Poel	(Netherlands) Jan van Houwelingen
1986	(Netherlands) Adri van der Poel	(Netherlands) Johan van der Velde	(Netherlands) Steven Rooks
1987	(Netherlands) Erik Breukink	(Republic of Ireland) Stephen Roche	(Spain) Pedro Delgado
1988	(Netherlands) Steven Rooks	(Spain) Pedro Delgado	(Netherlands) Gerrit Solleveld
1989	(Netherlands) Jelle Nijdam	(Netherlands) Jean-Paul van Poppel	(Republic of Ireland) Sean Kelly
1990	(Netherlands) Gerrit Solleveld	(East Germany) Olaf Ludwig	(Netherlands) Erik Breukink
1991	(Netherlands) Gert-Jan Theunisse	(Netherlands) Jean-Paul van Poppel	(Netherlands) Jelle Nijdam
1992	(Netherlands) Jean-Paul van Poppel	(Netherlands) Jelle Nijdam	(Netherlands) Jan Siemons
1993	(Netherlands) Eddy Bouwmans	(Poland) Zenon Jaskuła	(Netherlands) Gert Jacobs
1994	(Ukraine) Serhij Ušakov	(Belgium) Hendrik Redant	(Netherlands) Maarten den Bakker
1995	(United States) George Hincapie	(Germany) Thomas Fleischer	(Netherlands) Servais Knaven
1996	(Germany) Mike Weissmann	(Belgium) Johan Capiot	(Netherlands) Jeroen Blijlevens
1997	(Netherlands) Adri van der Poel	(Netherlands) Servais Knaven	(Netherlands) Erik Dekker
1998	(Netherlands) Jeroen Blijlevens	(Australia) Robbie McEwen	(Netherlands) Léon van Bon
1999	(Netherlands) Michael Boogerd	(United States) George Hincapie	(Netherlands) Servais Knaven
2000	(Italy) Marco Pantani	(Netherlands) Léon van Bon	(Netherlands) Jans Koerts
2001	(Netherlands) Servais Knaven	(Netherlands) Jans Koerts	(Germany) Jan Ullrich
2002	(Netherlands) Erik Dekker	(Netherlands) Servais Knaven	(Netherlands) Rudi Kemna
2003	(Netherlands) Servais Knaven	(Kazakhstan) Aleksandr Vinokurov	(Italy) Alessandro Petacchi
2004	(Italy) Ivan Basso	(Netherlands) Max van Heeswijk	(Norway) Thor Hushovd
2005	(Belgium) Tom Boonen	(Netherlands) Léon van Bon	(Netherlands) Servais Knaven
2006	(Netherlands) Michael Boogerd	(Netherlands) Stef Clement	(Netherlands) Steven de Jongh
2007	(Netherlands) Koos Moerenhout	(Colombia) Mauricio Soler	(Netherlands) Bram Tankink
2008	(Spain) Óscar Freire	(Australia) Robbie McEwen	(Netherlands) Lars Boom
2009	(Netherlands) Laurens ten Dam	(Luxembourg) Andy Schleck	(Netherlands) Steven de Jongh
2010	(Netherlands) Niki Terpstra	(Netherlands) Robert Gesink	(Netherlands) Servais Knaven
2011	(Netherlands) Johnny Hoogerland	(Luxembourg) Fränk Schleck	(Netherlands) Niki Terpstra
2012	(Netherlands) Bauke Mollema	(Netherlands) Tom Veelers	(Spain) Haimar Zubeldia
2013	(Germany) Marcel Kittel	(Netherlands) Danny van Poppel	(Netherlands) Boy van Poppel
2014	(Netherlands) Niki Terpstra	(Netherlands) Lars Boom	(Netherlands) Tom Veelers
2015	(Netherlands) Robert Gesink	(Eritrea) Daniel Teklehaimanot	(Netherlands) Stef Clement
2016	(Netherlands) Stef Clement	(Netherlands) Bauke Mollema	(Netherlands) Danny van Poppel
2017	(United Kingdom) Chris Froome	(Netherlands) Bauke Mollema	(Netherlands) Dylan Groenewegen
2018	(Netherlands) Tom Dumoulin	(Netherlands) Steven Kruijswijk	(Netherlands) Mathieu van der Poel
2019	(Colombia) Egan Bernal	(Netherlands) Steven Kruijswijk	(Netherlands) Dylan Groenewegen

=== Women ===
Year	Winner	Second	Third
1992	(Netherlands) Monique Knol	(Netherlands) M. Groen	(Germany) A. Artmann
2001	(Netherlands) Leontien Zijlaard-van Moorsel	(Netherlands) Andrea Bosman	(Netherlands) Sandra Rombouts
2002	(Netherlands) Leontien Zijlaard-van Moorsel	(Sweden) Madeleine Lindberg	(Netherlands) Sandra Rombouts
2003	(Netherlands) Vera Koedooder	(Netherlands) Ghita Beltman	(Netherlands) Elsbeth Van Rooy-Vink
2004	(Netherlands) Leontien Zijlaard-van Moorsel	(Netherlands) Arenda Grimberg	(Netherlands) Daphny van den Brand
2005	no women's race		
2006	(Netherlands) Suzanne de Goede	(Netherlands) Sandra Rombouts	(Netherlands) Marianne Vos
2007	(Netherlands) Marianne Vos	(Netherlands) Ellen van Dijk	(Netherlands) Regina Bruins
2008	(Netherlands) Vera Koedooder	(Netherlands) Jaccolien Wallaard	(United Kingdom) Lizzie Armitstead
2009	(Netherlands) Marianne Vos	(United Kingdom) Nikki Harris	(Netherlands) Arenda Grimberg
2010	(Netherlands) Chantal Blaak	(Germany) Hanka Kupfernagel	(Netherlands) Loes Gunnewijk
2011	(Netherlands) Marianne Vos	(Netherlands) Vera Koedooder	(Germany) Sarah Düster
2012	(Netherlands) Nina Kessler	(Netherlands) Esra Tromp	(Netherlands) Rebecca Talen
2013	(Netherlands) Thalita de Jong	(Netherlands) Amy Pieters	(Netherlands) Loes Gunnewijk
2014	(Netherlands) Marianne Vos	(Netherlands) Vera Koedooder	(Netherlands) Thalita de Jong
2015	(Netherlands) Thalita de Jong	(Germany) Hanka Kupfernagel	(Netherlands) Vera Koedooder
2016	(Netherlands) Marianne Vos	(Netherlands) Anna van der Breggen	(Netherlands) Thalita de Jong
2017	(Netherlands) Marianne Vos	(Netherlands) Anna van der Breggen	(Netherlands) Nina Kessler
2018	(Netherlands) Marianne Vos	(Australia) Lauretta Hanson	(Netherlands) Natalie van Gogh

== Organization ==
=== Theo van der Westerlaken ===
Since 1971 the competition was organized by Theo van der Westerlaken (1949 – 14 July 2020), the son of the founder of Acht van Chaam. For his works he was awarded by the Royal Dutch Cycling Union with the "Gouden Wiel" (translated: Golden Wheel) in July 2020. A week later van der Westerlaken died on 14 July due to an illness, aged 71. A plaque on the cycling monument opposite his house in the center of Chaam will be placed by the board of Acht van Chaam.
