= Nicolle Van Den Broeck =

Belgian cyclist

- Van Den Broeck as world champion in 1973

Personal information
- Full name: Nicolle Van Den Broeck
- Born: 9 November 1946 Meise, Belgium
- Died: 17 April 2017 (aged 70)

Cycling career
- Sport: Cycling
- Role: Rider

Major wins
- Road One-day races and Classics World Road Race Championship (1973) National Road Race Championships (1969, 1970, 1973, 1974, 1977) Track National Championships (1975, 1976, 1977, 1979)
Medal record
Representing Belgium
Women's road cycling
World Championships
Gold medal – first place	1973 Barcelona	Road race

Nicolle Van Den Broeck (9 November 1946 – 17 April 2017) was a Belgian racing cyclist. She won the Belgian national road race title in 1969, 1970, 1973, 1974 and 1977, and became world champion in 1973 in Barcelona. Van Den Broeck often rode for Italian teams during her career and participated in numerous races there.

== Career achievements ==
=== Major results ===
==== Road ====
1967
10h Road race, UCI World Championships
1968
2nd Road race, National Road Championships
9th Road race, UCI World Championships
1969
1st Road race, National Road Championships
4th Road race, UCI World Championships
1970
1st Road race, National Road Championships
1972
2nd Road race, National Road Championships
9th Road race, UCI World Championships
1973
1st Road race, UCI World Championships
1st Road race, National Road Championships
1974
1st Road race, National Road Championships
8th Road race, UCI World Championships
1975
1st Trofeo Alfredo Binda-Comune di Cittiglio
4th Road race, National Road Championships
7th Road race, UCI World Championships
1976
2nd Road race, National Road Championships
5th Road race, UCI World Championships
1977
1st Road race, National Road Championships

==== Track ====
1967
3rd Individual pursuit, National Track Championships
1969
2nd Individual pursuit, National Track Championships
1975
1st Individual pursuit, National Track Championships
1976
1st Individual pursuit, National Track Championships
1977
1st Individual pursuit, National Track Championships
1978
3rd Individual pursuit, National Track Championships
1979
1st Individual pursuit, National Track Championships
