= Steven De Neef =

Belgian cyclist

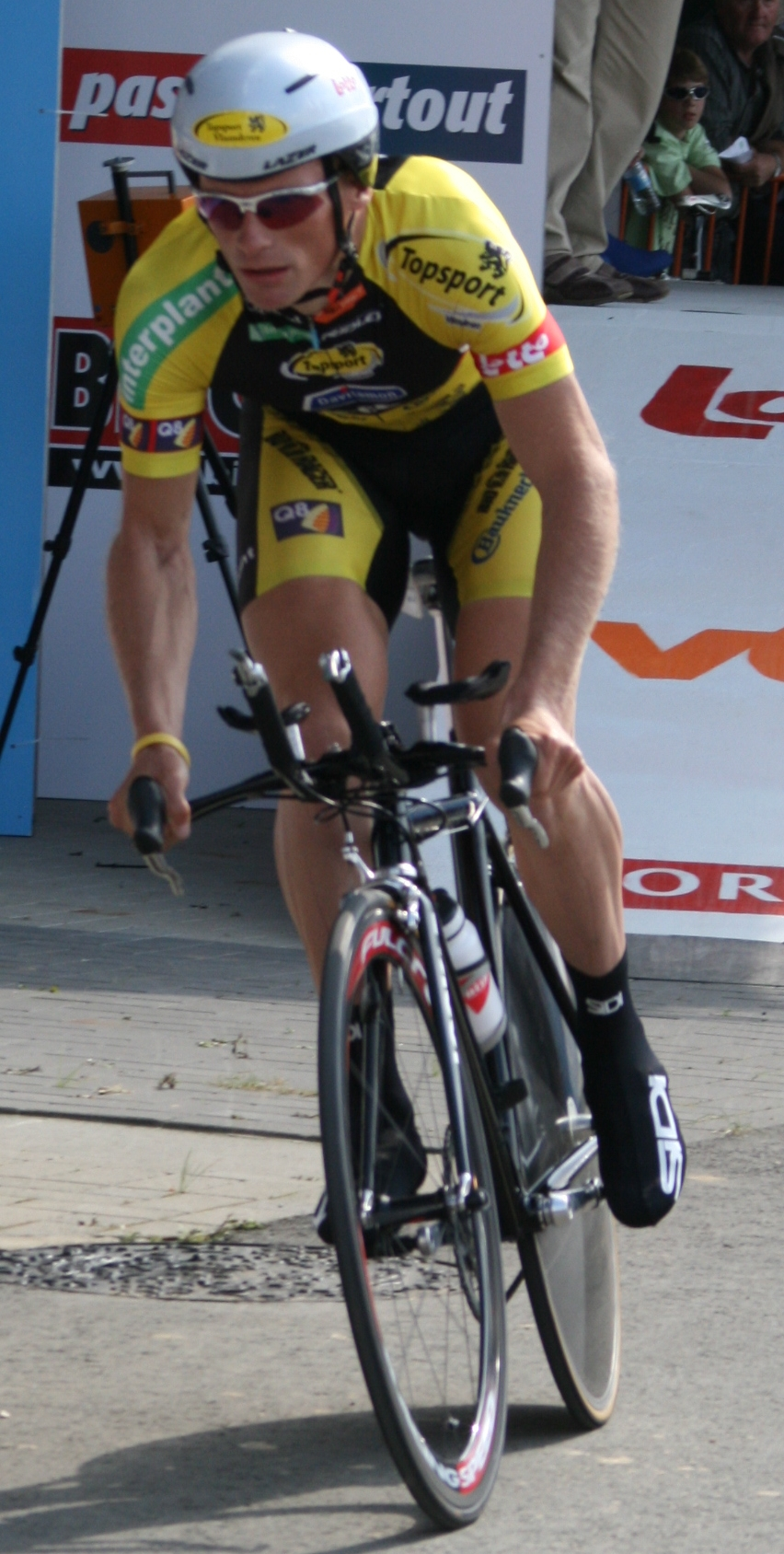

Personal information
- Full name: Steven De Neef
- Born: 16 January 1971 (age 55) Asse, Belgium

Cycling career
- Sport: Cycling
- Current team: Retired
- Disciplines: Road, Track
- Role: Rider

Professional teams
- 1997–1998: Collstrop
- 1999: Ipso-Euroclean
- 2000: Flanders-Prefetex
- 2001: Bankgiroloterij-Batavus
- 2002–2003: Marlux
- 2004: Jong Vlaanderen 2016
- 2005–2011: Bodysol–Win for Life–Jong Vlaanderen

Steven De Neef (born 16 January 1971 in Asse) is a former Belgian professional racing cyclist, who competed as a professional between 1997 and 2011.

== Career wins ==
1996
1st, Overall, Ronde van Antwerpen
2000
1st, Wetteren
2002
3rd, Schaal Sels
2003
1st, Zele
(silver) European Derny Championship, Nieuwpoort, Belgium
2006
1st, Tienen
3rd, National Team Pursuit Championship, Ghent (with Leys/Crabbé/Roelandts)
2007
2nd, National Madison Championship, Ghent (with Dimitri De Fauw)
2nd, National Derny Champion, Ghent
3rd, National Points race Championship, Ghent
3rd, National Derny Champion, Ghent
