= Guy de Thourout =

Guy de Thourout was a 13th-century knight from the county of Flanders. He was the son of Henri de Thourout, knight, who is mentioned in an act of 26 February 1279, and who probably died before 21 August 1281. He held lands primarily in the western part of Flanders. Guy did homage to Guy of Dampierre, Count of Flanders, on 21 August 1281 for lands in Wervik, Reninge and Rollegem. He also held land in Menen and Rekkem, a manor in Varsenare, and owned a number of houses within the city of Ypres.

When war broke out between the Count of Flanders and Philip IV of France in 1297, he served in the count's forces in the garrison of Ypres, under the command of John of Namur. Most of his land fell under French occupation, and without that revenue he was obliged to raise loans within the city secured by his property there. The French declared his lands elsewhere forfeit, awarding his manor in Varsenare to Dominique Maere in April 1299, and his lands in Menen, Rekkem and Wervik to Raoul de Clermont later the same year.

In January 1300 Guy of Dampierre was captured by the French, and Guy de Thourout was among the small group of the count's supporters captured with him. The last documentary trace of his life records that in December 1301 he was imprisoned at Loudun.
