= Varsenare =

Coordinates: 51°11′N 3°09′E

Varsenare is a town in Jabbeke, part of Flanders and Belgium. Its postal code is 8490.

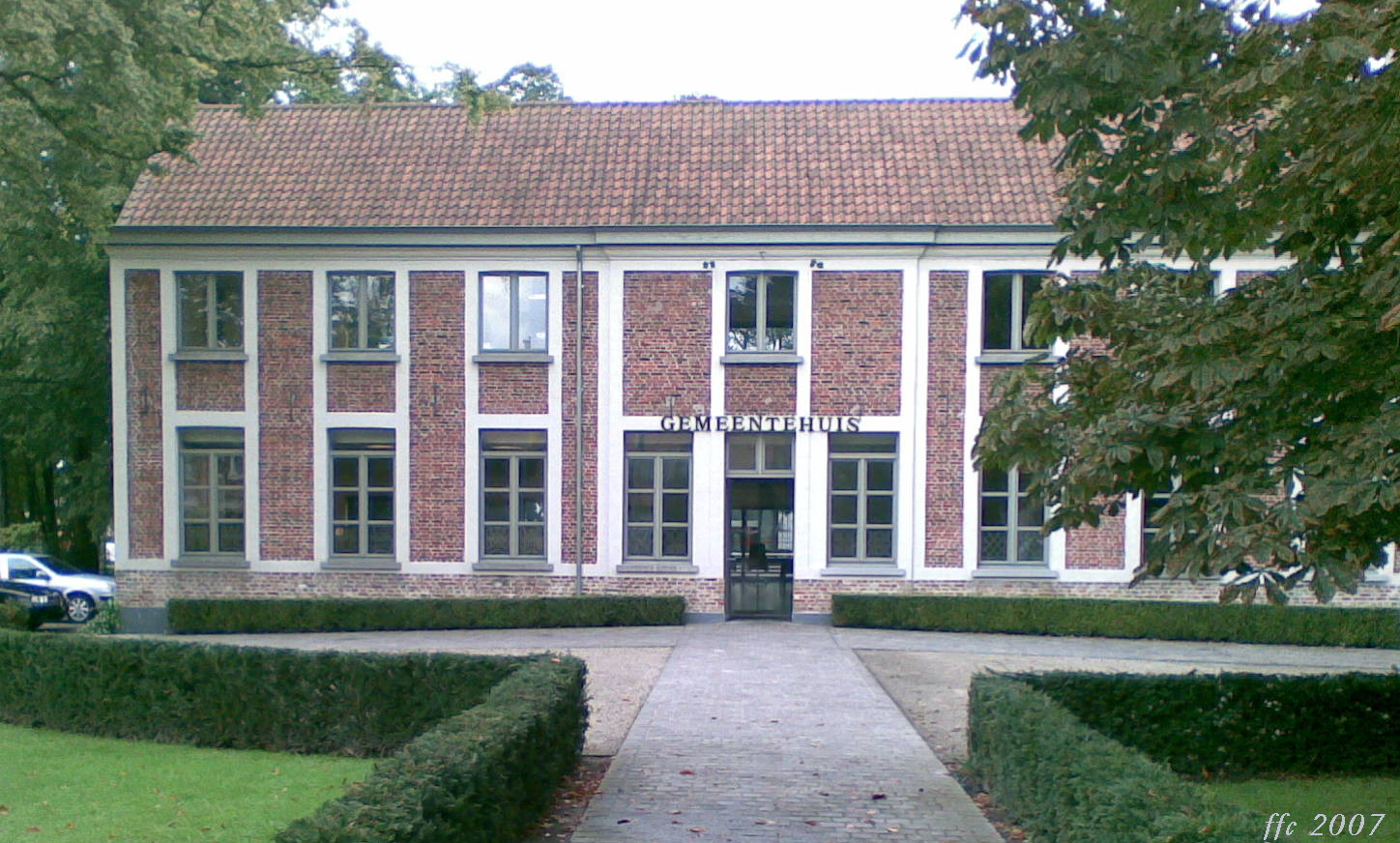
Varsenare town hall

== Notable people ==
- Jan Blomme, cyclist
- Dirk De fauw, politician
- Johan Museeuw, road racing cyclist
- Guy de Thourout, knight

== See also ==
- West Flanders
