= Karel Kaers =

Belgian cyclist

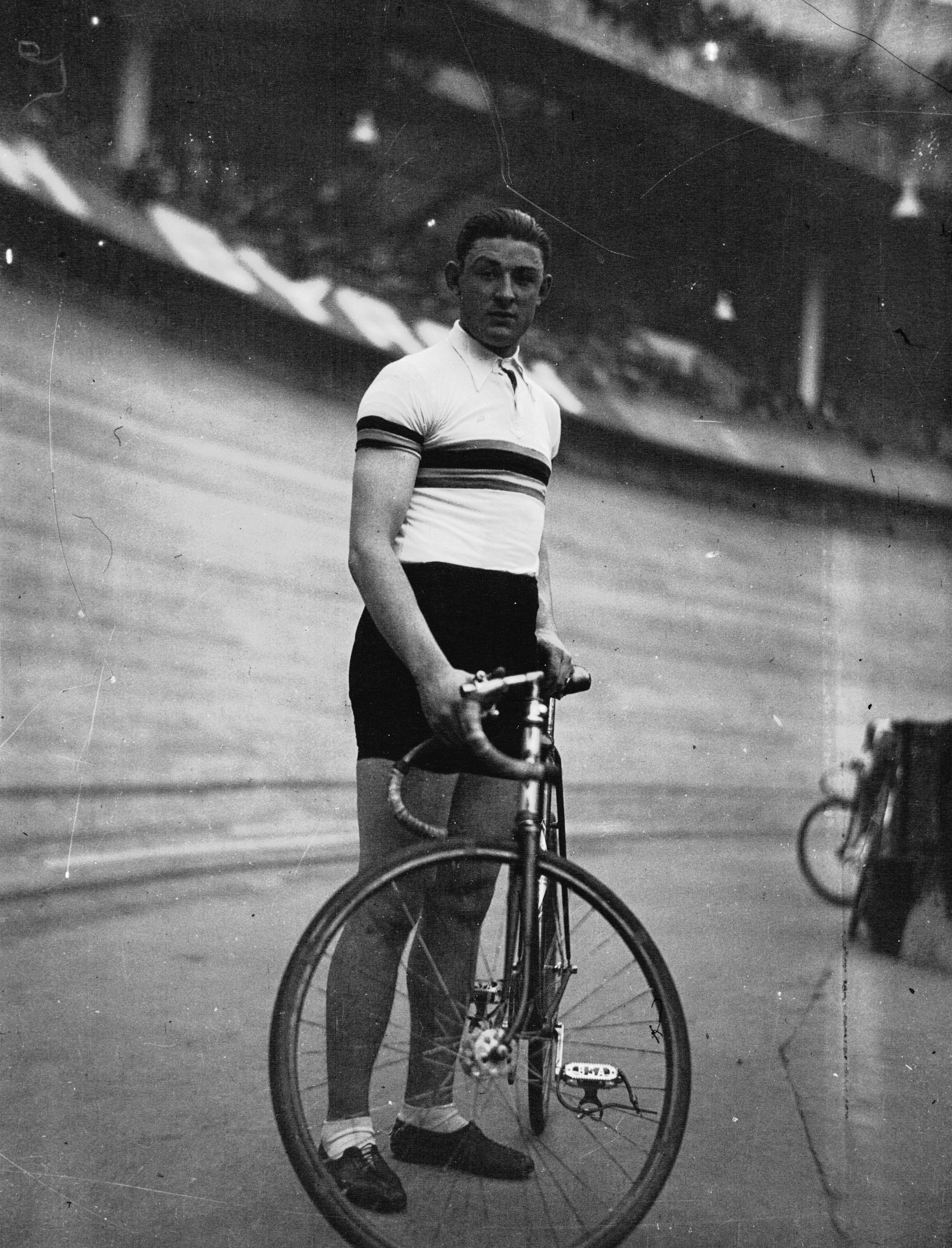
- Kaers with rainbow jersey in 1934

Personal information
- Full name: Karel Kaers
- Nickname: Le Phénomène
- Born: 3 June 1914 Vosselaar, Belgium
- Died: 20 December 1972 (aged 58) Antwerp, Belgium

Cycling career
- Sport: Cycling
- Disciplines: Road, track
- Role: Rider
- Rider type: Sprinter

Professional teams
- 1933-1934: Individual
- 1935: Pélissier-Hutchinson
- 1936: Colin-Wolber and Bristol
- 1937-1938: Alcyon-Dunlop and Bury
- 1939-1940: Alcyon
- 1941-1943: Individual
- 1944: A. Trialoux-Wolber
- 1945-46: Individual
- 1947: Magali

Major wins
- One-day races and Classics World Road Race Championships (1934) National Road Race Championships (1937) Tour of Flanders (1939) Track Championships National Track Championships Individual pursuit (1939)
Medal record
Representing Belgium
Men's road bicycle racing
World Championships
Gold medal – first place	1934 Leipzig	Elite Men's Road Race

Karel Kaers (3 June 1914 – 20 December 1972) was a Belgian professional cyclist with 30 wins.

Kaers was born in Vosselaar. In 1934 he became the youngest world road champion, winning in Leipzig at 20. It was the first time he had ridden the race. He also won the Tour of Flanders in 1939, and the Belgian national championship in 1937.

His last race was on the track at Ordrup, near Copenhagen, Denmark, on 9 May 1948. He finished fourth in an omnium competition.

== Youngest world champion ==
Lance Armstrong is frequently described as the youngest world champion. In fact, he was only the third youngest road champion when he took the rainbow jersey in Oslo in 1993. Armstrong was two weeks short of 22; Kaers had just turned 20. Jean-Pierre Monseré was three weeks short of 22 when he became champion in Leicester on 16 August 1970.

== History ==
Karel Kaers started racing at 14 and won 37 events in his first two years, including the Belgian boys' championship on the road. He became a junior in 1931 and won the national sprint championship. He became an independent, or semi-professional, and then a full professional in 1932, riding mainly on the track until 1934.

In 1934 he began riding more on the road, winning the world championship at Leipzig. That winter he rode 1m 9.6s for a standing-start kilometre and, another track record, 1m 48s for the flying-start kilometre, both on the Vélodrome d'Hiver in Paris. He won the 320 km Circuit of Paris road race in 1937, then rode the track again in the winter and equalled Jef Scherens' record of 29.6s for 500 metres. He then broke the world one-mile record at Wembley, during the six-day race, by riding 1m 49.6s.

His weight, 85 kg, made him a poor climber and he never succeeded in hilly races.

== Retirement ==
Karel Kaers ran a bar inside the entrance to the Sportpaleis track in Antwerp after he stopped racing. He died in Antwerp, aged 58 after an intracranial hemorrhage.

== Career ==
=== Road ===
1930
1st Road race, U17 National Road Championships
1932
1st Etoile des Juniors
1933
1st Omloop Groot Oostende
1st Vosselaar
1934
1st Road race, UCI World Championships
1st Antwerp
1st Blankenberge
1st Sombreffe
1st Kontich
1st Ossendrecht
1st Sombreffe
1st Critérium de Zürich
7th Giro della Provincia di Milano
1935 – Francis Pélissier
1st Acht van Chaam
1st Grote 1-MeiPrijs
10th Circuit de Paris (fr)
1936 – Colin
1st Acht van Chaam
1st Antwerp
1st Bar-le-Duc
1st Muizen
1st Schaarbeek
7th Circuit de Paris (fr)
1937 – Alcyon, Bury
1st Road race, National Road Championships
1st Circuit de Paris (fr)
1st Grote 1-MeiPrijs
1st Nationale Sluitingsprijs
1st Critérium de Zürich
1st Antwerp
1st Brasschaat
1st Bar-le-Duc
1938 – Alcyon, Bury
1st Acht van Chaam
1st Stage 1 Paris-Saint-Étienne (fr)
1st Critérium de Bruxelles
1st Wouw
1939 – Alcyon
1st Tour of Flanders
1st Prix Torpédo in Schweinfurt
1st Critérium de Liège
1940 – Alcyon
1st Critérium de Bruxelles
1st Mechelen
1941
1st Omloop der Vlaamse Gewesten
1st Critérium de Namur
1942
1st Kortrijk
1st Wakken
1st Hoboken
1st Herentals
1st Namur
3rd Gullegem Koerse
1943
1st Antwerp
1st Ougrée
1st Herentals
1946
1st Critérium de Zürich
1947 – Magali

=== Track ===
1931
1st Sprint, Junior National Track Championships
1932
1st Sprint, Junior National Track Championships
1934
3rd Sprint National Track Championships
1935
3rd Sprint National Track Championships
1936
1st Six Days of Paris (with Albert Billiet)
3rd Sprint National Track Championships
1937
3rd Sprint National Track Championships
1938
1st Six Days of Paris (with Albert Billiet)
1939
National Track Championships

1st Individual pursuit
3rd Sprint

1st Six Days of London (with Omer De Bruycker)
1st Six Days of Copenhagen (with Omer De Bruycker)
3rd Six Days of Antwerp (with Omer De Bruycker)
3rd Six Days of Brussels (with Omer De Bruycker)
1940
1st Six Days of Brussels (with Omer De Bruycker)
2nd National motor-paced championship
1941
2nd Sprint National Track Championships
1941
2nd Omnium National Track Championships
1944
2nd Omnium National Track Championships
