= Kees Pellenaars =

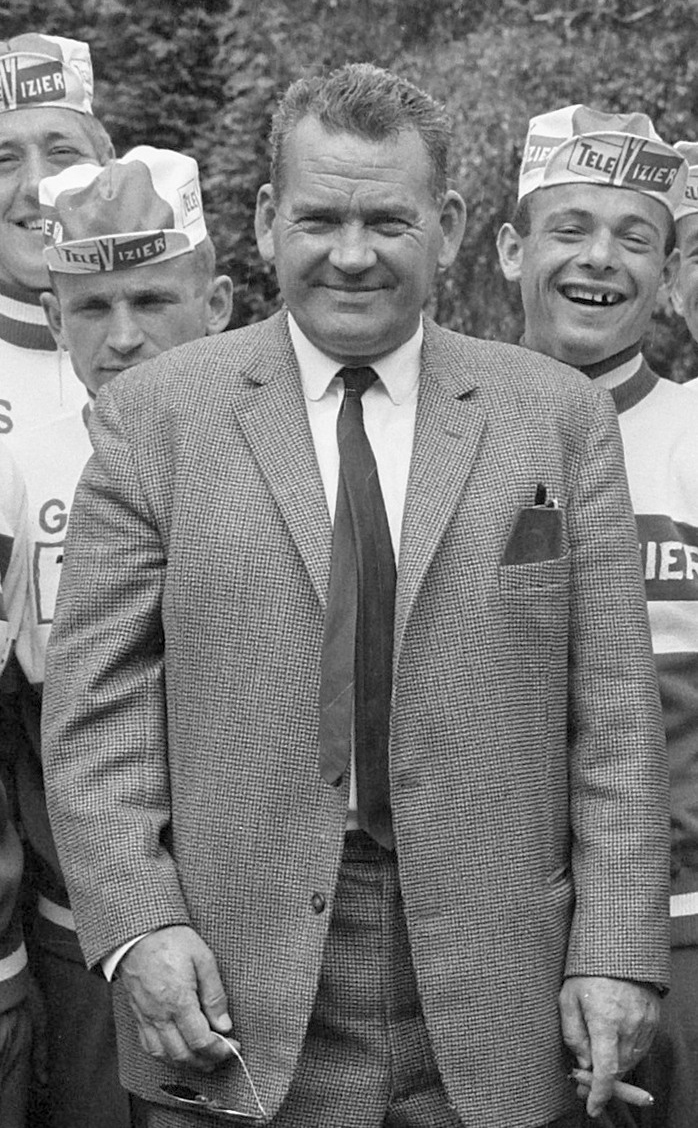
- Kees Pellenaars in 1965

Personal information
- Born: 10 May 1913 Terheijden, the Netherlands
- Died: 30 January 1988 (aged 74) Breda, the Netherlands

Sport
- Sport: Cycling
Medal record
Representing the Netherlands
Road World Championships
Gold medal – first place	1934 Leipzig	Road race, amateurs

Cornelis Petrus "Kees" Pellenaars (10 May 1913 – 30 January 1988) was a Dutch road cyclist and coach. In 1934 he won the amateur road race at the world championships, which was the first world road title for the Netherlands. The same year he turned professional and won dozens of competitions over the next 16 years, including the six-day races of Paris (1936), Copenhagen (1937), Ghent (1938) and Brussels (1939).

On 20 August 1950, during the Tour of Germany, Pellenaars hit an American military vehicle at high speed, and crashed so seriously that a Belgian newspaper published his obituary. He recovered, but retired from racing and focused on coaching. He had much success with the Dutch team at the Tour de France: in 1951 Wim van Est became the first Dutchman to wear the yellow jersey, and in 1953 the Netherlands won the team competition. This career came to an end in 1962, when national teams at the Tour were replaced by individual professional teams. He continued coaching over the next decades, in particular the Goudsmit-Hoffploeg since 1971, but without much success.

Pellenaars was born to Petrus Pellenaars, a farmer, and Cornelia Wilhelmina van Alphen. On 27 July 1942 he married Adriana Cornelia de Wit, with whom he had two sons. After her death on 27 January 1962, on 10 July 1962 he married Antonia Cornelia van de Reijt. They had no children.
