= 1939 Tour of Flanders =

Race details
- Dates: 2 April 1939
- Stages: 1
- Distance: 230 km (140 mi)
- Winning time: 6h 32' 00"

Results
	Winner	Karel Kaers (BEL)
	Second	Romain Maes (BEL)
	Third	Edward Vissers (BEL)

The 23rd edition of the Tour of Flanders cycling classic race was held on Sunday, 2 April 1939. Belgian Karel Kaers won the Monument. Of the 169 starting cyclists, 47 reached the finish.

== Route ==
The race started in Ghent and covered 230 km on the way to the finish in Wetteren.

The course featured 3 categorized climbs:

- Kwaremont
- Kruisberg
- Edelareberg

== Race report ==
Karel Kaers, the youngest road world champion in history, won the race unintentionally. For him, the race was intended as training for Paris-Roubaix. He drove to Kwaremont near Kluisbergen, parked his car and rode 40 km with his bicycle to the start in Ghent. His plan was to start the race with his usual training partner, stop the race when he got to his car and then head home. Knowing that he wasn't going to run the whole race, Kaers broke away from the peloton to train on his own, and reached Kwaremont with a one-minute lead. Meanwhile, his manager had parked his car further back to force Kaers to continue. With his car gone and still feeling great, Kaers continued the race and won.

== General classification ==
=== Final general classification ===
Rank	Rider	Team	Time
1	Karel Kaers (BEL)	Alcyon–Dunlop	6h 32' 00"
2	Romain Maes (BEL)	Individual	+ 10"
3	Edward Vissers (BEL)	Alcyon–Dunlop	s.t.
4	Roger van den Driessche (BEL)	Essor	+ 1' 15"
5	Auguste Toubeau (BEL)	Essor	+ 2' 30"
6	Frans Spiessens (BEL)	Helyett–Hutchinson	s.t.
7	Sylvain Grysolle (BEL)	Dilecta–Wolber	+ 2' 40"
8	Joseph Moerenhout (BEL)	Colin	s.t.
9	Frans Bonduel (BEL)	Dilecta–Wolber	s.t.
10	Albert Hendrickx (BEL)	Labor–Dunlop	s.t.
