= Diederik Foubert =

Belgian cyclist

Personal information
- Born: 12 July 1961 (age 65) Antwerp, Belgium

Cycling career
- Sport: Cycling

Diederik Foubert (born 12 July 1961) is a Belgian former cyclist. He competed in the team pursuit event at the 1980 Summer Olympics.
