= Kristel Werckx =

Belgian cyclist

Personal information
- Full name: Kristel Werckx
- Born: 16 December 1969 (age 56) Heusden-Zolder, Belgium

Cycling career
- Sport: Cycling
- Role: Rider

Kristel Werckx (born 16 December 1969) is a former Belgian racing cyclist. She won the Belgian national road race title in 1991 and 1993. She finished 7th at the 1990 World Championships. She also competed at the 1988 and 1992 Summer Olympics.
