= Gilke Croket =

Belgian cyclist (born 1992)

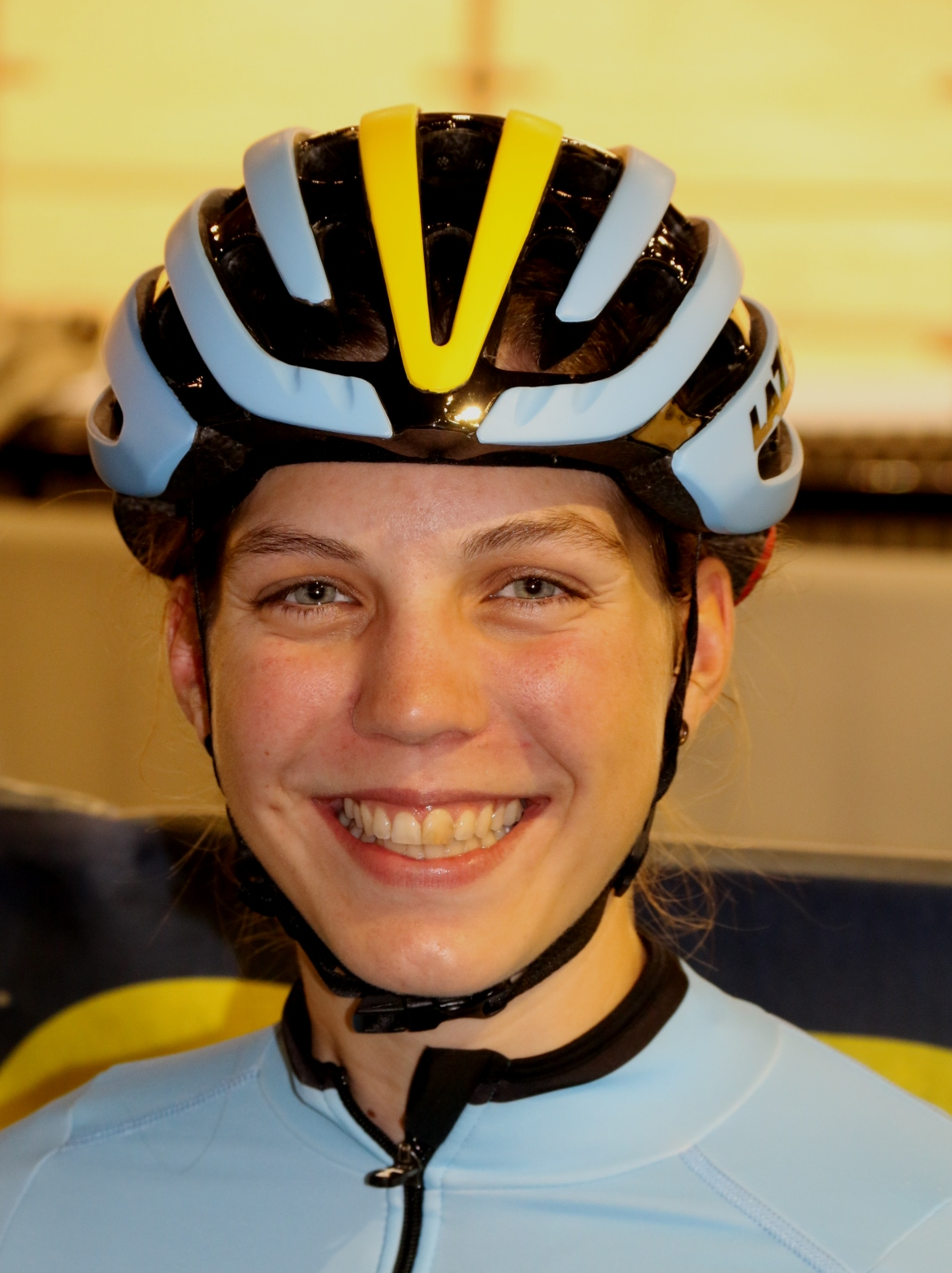
- Gilke Croket (2017)

Personal information
- Born: 1 November 1992 (age 33) Belgium

Cycling career
- Sport: Cycling
- Role: Rider

Gilke Croket (born 1 November 1992) is a Belgian racing cyclist. She rode at the 2014 UCI Road World Championships.

== Major results ==
2012
2nd Team Pursuit, UEC European U23 Track Championships (with Jolien D'Hoore and Sarah Inghelbrecht)
