= Jonathan Dufrasne =

Belgian cyclist

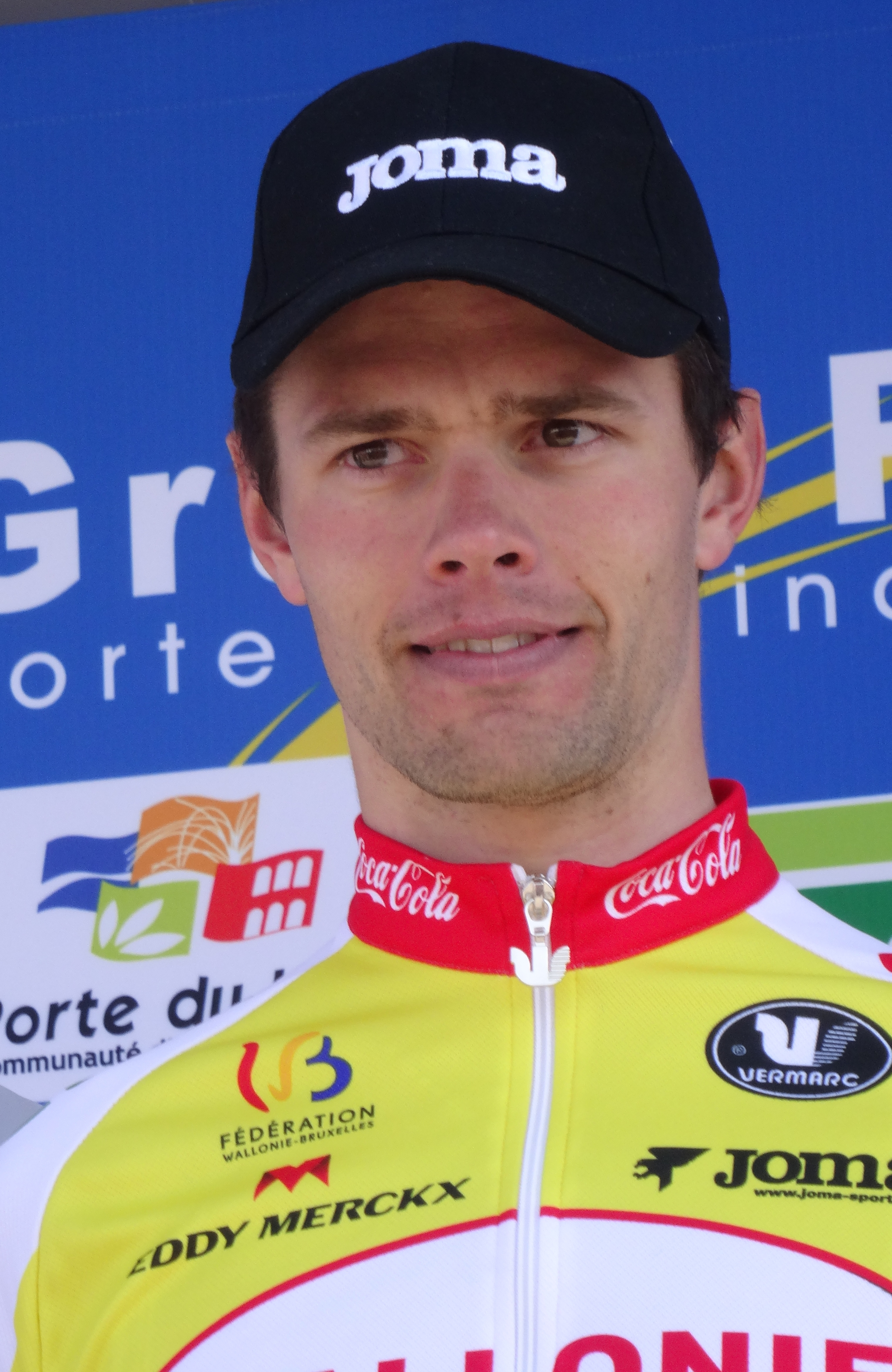
Jonathan Dufrasne.

Jonathan Dufrasne (born 2 August 1987, Boussu, Hainault, Belgium) is a Belgian track cyclist. At the 2012 Summer Olympics, he competed in the Men's team pursuit for the national team.
