= Chantal Van Havere =

Belgian cyclist

Personal information
- Full name: Chantal Van Havere

Cycling career
- Sport: Cycling
- Role: Rider

Chantal Van Havere is a former Belgian racing cyclist. She finished in second place in the Belgian National Road Race Championships in 1980.
