= Jan Blomme =

Belgian cyclist

Personal information
- Born: 27 May 1959 (age 67) Varsenare, Belgium

Cycling career
- Sport: Cycling

Jan Blomme (born 27 May 1959) is a Belgian former cyclist. He competed in the 1000m time trial and team pursuit events at the 1980 Summer Olympics.
