= Sarah Inghelbrecht =

Belgian cyclist

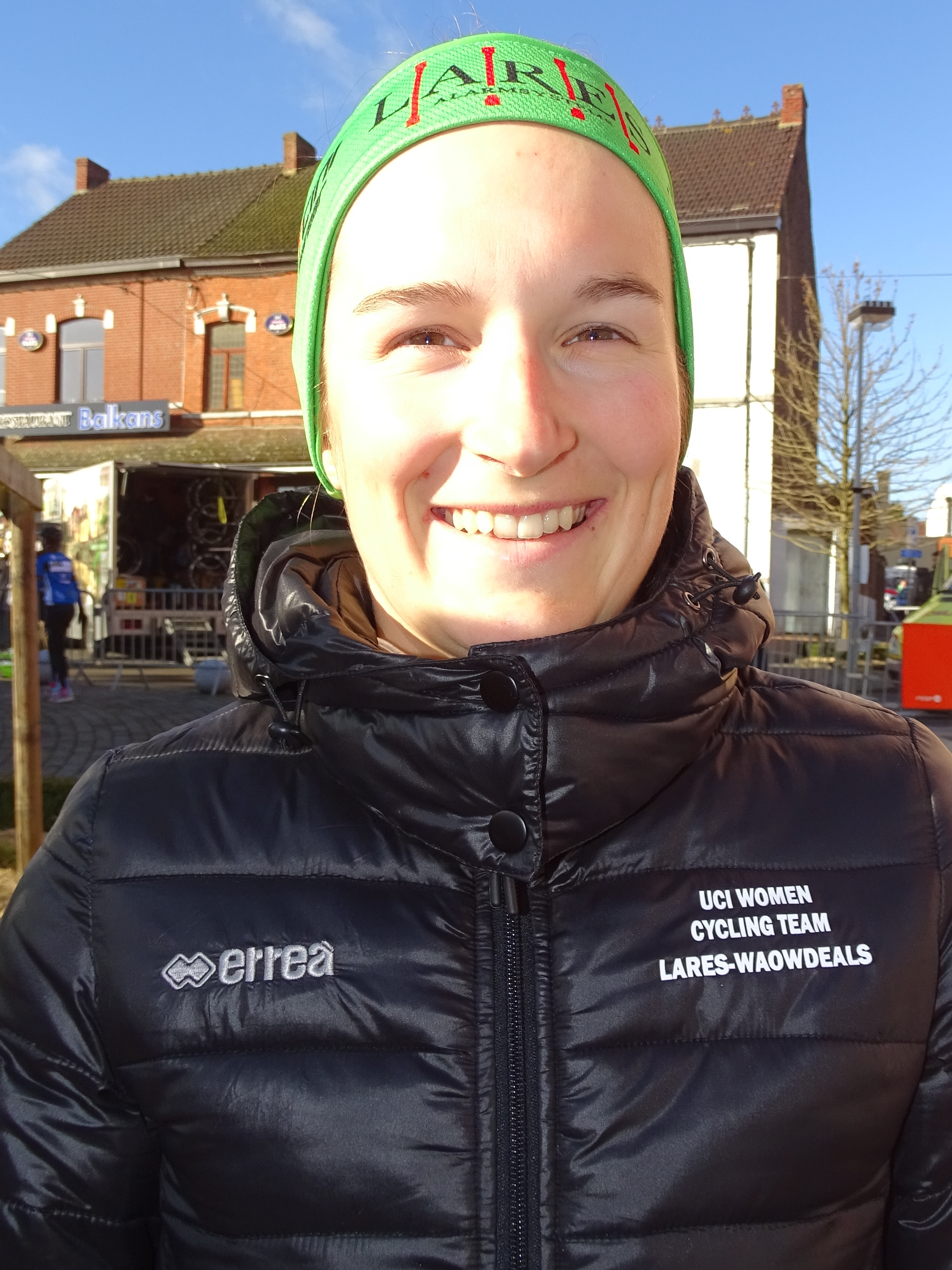
- Inghelbrecht in 2016.

Personal information
- Full name: Sarah Inghelbrecht
- Born: 1 October 1992 (age 34) Bruges, Belgium

Cycling career
- Sport: Cycling
- Disciplines: Track; Road
- Role: Rider
- Rider type: Pursuitist (track)

Amateur team
- 2019: MEXX–Watersley

Professional teams
- 2016–2018: Lares–Waowdeals
- 2020: Charente-Maritime Women Cycling

Sarah Inghelbrecht (born 1 October 1992) is a Belgian road and track cyclist, who most recently rode for UCI Women's Continental Team Charente-Maritime Women Cycling. She competed at the 2013 UCI Track Cycling World Championships.

== Major results ==
2012
2nd Team pursuit, UEC European Under-23 Track Championships (with Jolien D'Hoore and Gilke Croket)
2014
Irish International Track GP

2nd Scratch
3rd Keirin
3rd Omnium

3rd Points race, Belgian Xmas Meetings
2015
2nd Time trial, West Flanders Provincial Road Championships
2016
7th Gran Prix San Luis Femenino
2017
6th Tour of Guangxi
2018
7th Overall Tour of Eftalia Hotels & Velo Alanya
10th Veenendaal–Veenendaal Classic
2019
10th Overall Tour of Thailand
