= 1934 UCI Road World Championships =

- Venue: Leipzig, Germany
- Date: 18 August 1934
- Coordinates: 51°20′24″N 12°22′30″E
- Events: 2

The 1934 UCI Road World Championships was the fourteenth edition of the UCI Road World Championships.

The championship took place in Leipzig, Germany on Saturday 18 August 1934, on a flat 9.4-kilometre circuit that ran through the large Scheibenholz park. The professionals had to cover 225.6 km (24 laps) and the amateurs 112.8 km (12 laps).

In the same period, the 1934 UCI Track Cycling World Championships was organized in the Sportplatz Leipzig.

== Events Summary ==
Event	Gold		Silver		Bronze	
Men's Events
Professional Road Race	Karel Kaers; Belgium	5h 45' 15"; Media 37,994 km/h	Learco Guerra; Italy	s.t.	Gustave Danneels; Belgium	s.t.
Amateur Road Race	Kees Pellenaars; Netherlands	-	André Deforge; France	-	Paul André; Belgium	-
