= Linda Troyekens =

Belgian cyclist

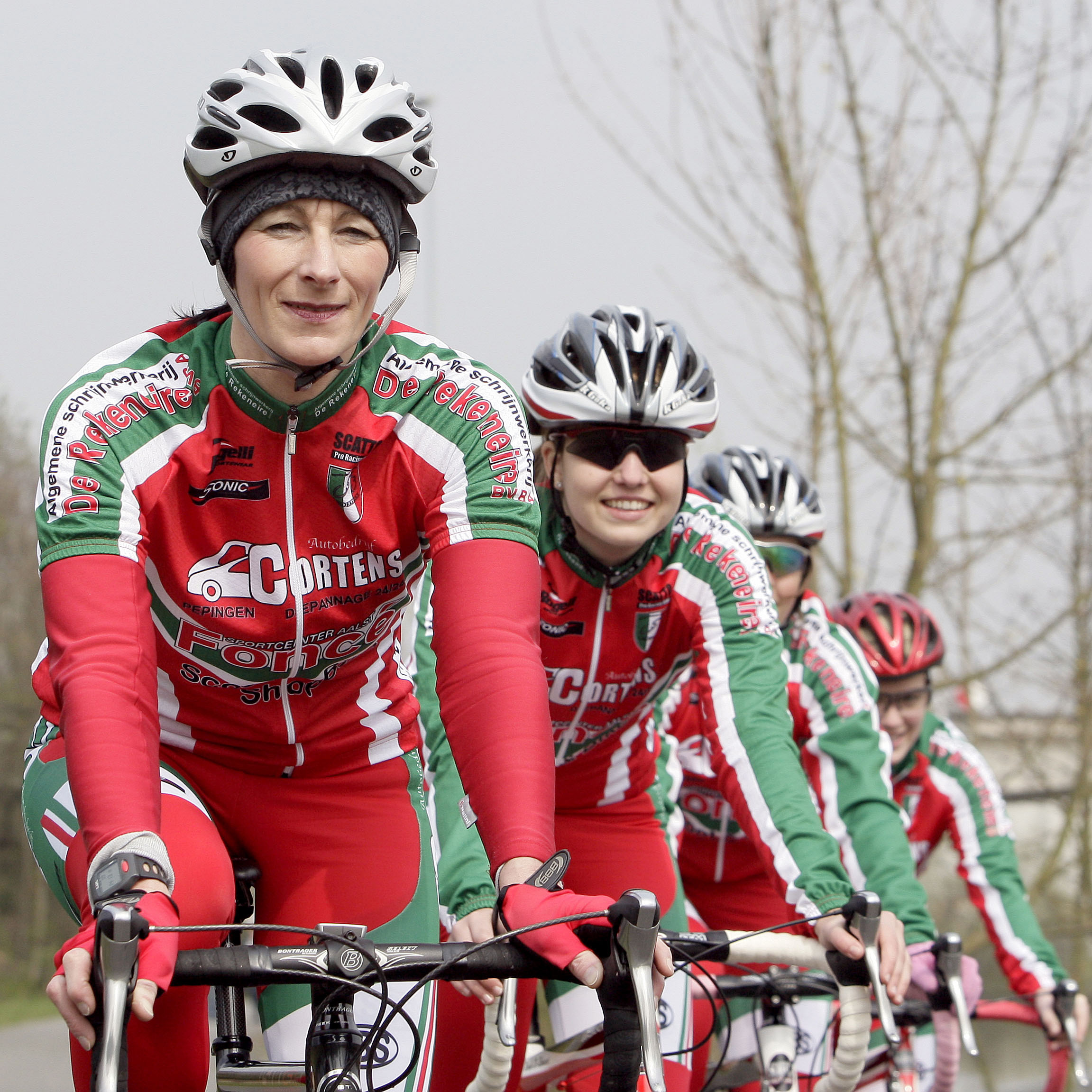
- Linda Troyekens in 2008

Personal information
- Full name: Linda Troyekens
- Born: 11 May 1960 (age 66) Asse, Belgium

Cycling career
- Sport: Cycling
- Role: Rider

Linda Troyekens (born 11 May 1960) is a former Belgian racing cyclist. She finished in second place in the Belgian National Road Race Championships in 1996.
