= Patsy Maegerman =

Belgian cyclist

Personal information
- Full name: Patsy Maegerman
- Born: 11 July 1972 (age 54) Aalst, Belgium

Cycling career
- Sport: Cycling
- Role: Rider
Medal record
Representing Belgium
Women's road cycling
World Championships
Silver medal – second place	1994	Road race

Patsy Maegerman (born 11 July 1972) is a Belgian former racing cyclist. At the 1994 UCI Road World Championships she won the silver medal in the women's road race. She finished in second place in the Belgian National Road Race Championships in 1994.
