= Frieda Maes =

Belgian cyclist

Personal information
- Full name: Frieda Maes
- Born: 28 July 1956 (age 70) Merksem, Belgium

Cycling career
- Sport: Cycling
- Role: Rider

Frieda Maes (born 28 July 1956) is a former Belgian racing cyclist. She finished in third place in the Belgian National Road Race Championships in 1978.
