= Dimitri De Fauw =

Belgian cyclist

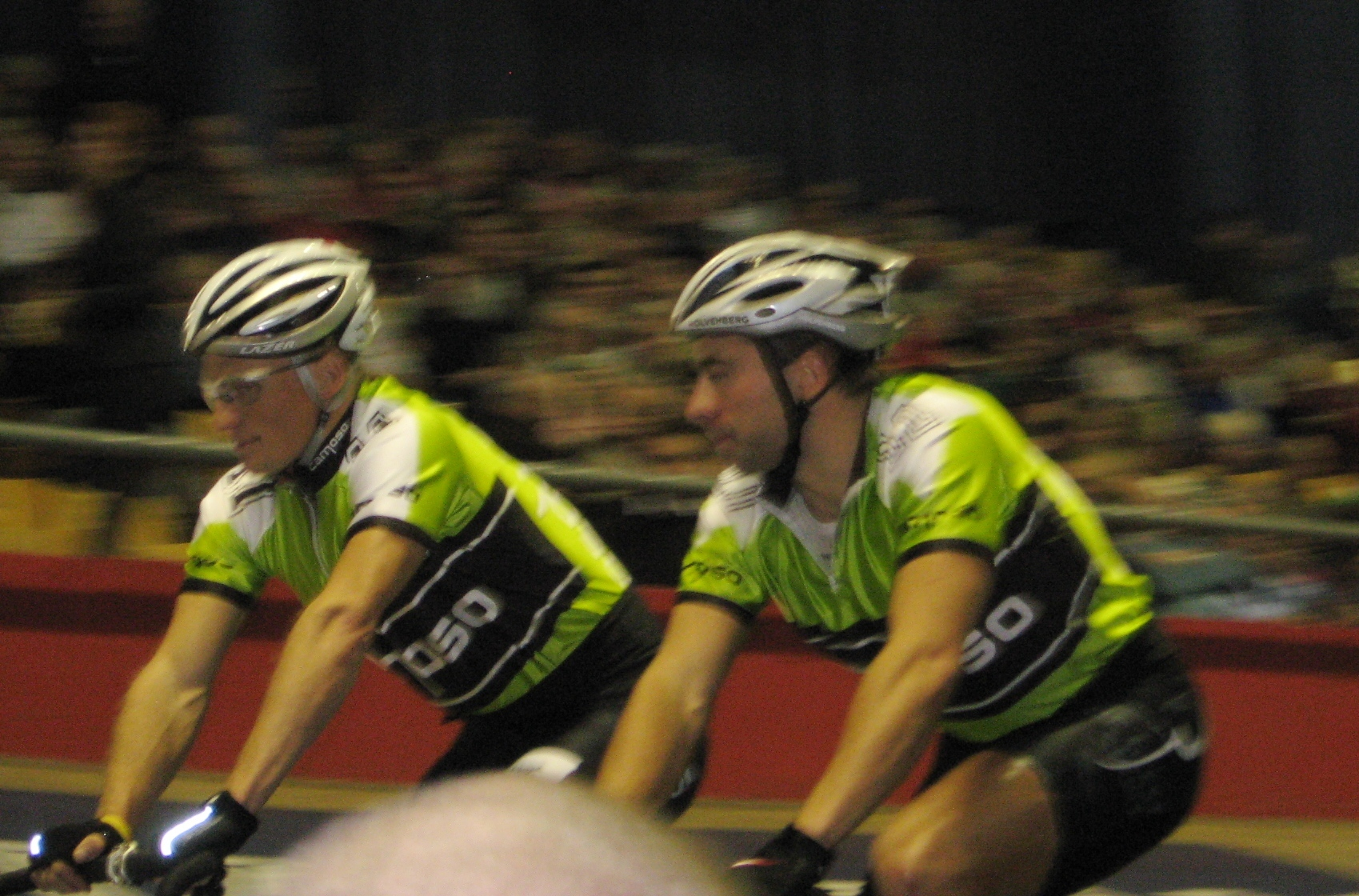
- Dimitri De Fauw (right)

Personal information
- Full name: Dimitri De Fauw
- Born: 13 July 1981 Ghent, Belgium
- Died: 6 November 2009 (aged 28) Belgium

Cycling career
- Sport: Cycling
- Disciplines: Road and track
- Role: Rider

Professional teams
- 2004–2005: Quick-Step–Davitamon
- 2006–2007: Chocolade Jacques–Topsport Vlaanderen
- 2008: Josan Mercedes-Benz Aalst Cycling Team

Dimitri De Fauw (13 July 1981 – 6 November 2009) was a Belgian professional road and track bicycle racer. He was born in Ghent. De Fauw competed on both the road and track but is best known for his crash during the 2006 Six Days of Ghent.

On 26 November, De Fauw collided with Spanish cyclist Isaac Gálvez during the madison portion of the Six Days of Ghent cycling event in Belgium. Both riders fell, though Gálvez crashed into the track's upper railing and was knocked unconscious. While medics resuscitated him at the scene, the Spaniard died of his injuries en route to hospital.

Despite continuing to race as a professional, De Fauw suffered from ongoing depression in the aftermath of Gálvez's death and was haunted by the accident. In an interview the following month, the 25-year-old De Fauw said, "I will carry this with me for the rest of my life. Only time can heal my wounds."

De Fauw died by suicide on 6 November 2009 in Belgium, shortly after competing in the Six Days of Grenoble.
